= 2016 Serbian local elections =

Local elections were held in most cities and municipalities of Serbia (excluding the disputed territory of Kosovo) on 24 April 2016, with repeat voting later taking place in some jurisdictions. The elections were held concurrently with the 2016 Serbian parliamentary election and the 2016 Vojvodina provincial election.

Elections were not held for the City Assembly of Belgrade, as its members were elected on a different four-year cycle (although local assembly elections were held in the City of Belgrade's constituent municipalities). Some other cities and municipalities also did not hold local elections in 2016, for the same reason.

All local elections in Serbia are held under proportional representation. Mayors are not directly elected but are instead chosen by elected members of the local assemblies. Parties were required to cross a five per cent electoral threshold (of all votes, not only of valid votes) in 2016, although this requirement was waived for parties representing national minority communities.

The Serbian Progressive Party's coalition, which won majority victories at the republic and provincial levels, also won most of the local elections.

== Results ==
=== Belgrade ===
Local elections were held in all seventeen of Belgrade's municipalities.

The Progressive Party and its allies finished first in fourteen municipalities and ultimately formed government in all fourteen. The three municipalities that the Progressives did not win were New Belgrade, Stari Grad, and Vračar. In New Belgrade, Aleksandar Šapić's independent list placed first, and Šapić was confirmed for a second term as mayor. In Stari Grad, the Democratic Party and its allies won the election and formed the local government. In Vračar, a multi-party coalition led by the Democratic Party narrowly defeated the Progressives, but the Progressives were able to form a government after splitting the coalition.

==== Barajevo ====
Results of the election for the Municipal Assembly of Barajevo:

Party	Votes	%	Seats	+/–
Aleksandar Vučić–Serbia Is Winning (Serbian Progressive Party, Social Democratic Party of Serbia, Movement of Socialists, Serbian Renewal Movement)	6,159	45.94	17	+6
Ivica Dačić–Socialist Party of Serbia SPS, United Serbia JS)–Dragan Marković Palma	1,315	9.81	3	–3
Social Democratic Party–Boris Tadić	1,132	8.44	3	New
Patriotic Bloc Democratic Party of Serbia–New Serbia	1,113	8.30	3	0
Democratic Party, Branka Savić	1,091	8.14	3	–7
Dr. Vojislav Šešelj–Serbian Radical Party	794	5.92	2	+2
Citizens' Group: Accord–Rade Tanasijević	733	5.47	2	New
Citizens' Group: Strength of Serbia–Rade Golubović	640	4.77	–	New
Serbian Movement Dveri	429	3.20	–	New
Total	13,406	100.00	33	0
Valid votes	13,406	95.75		
Invalid/blank votes	595	4.25		
Total votes	14,001	100.00		
Registered voters/turnout	23,657	59.18		

Slobodan Bata Adamović of the Progressive Party was chosen as mayor after the election. The local coalition government was formed by the Progressives, the Socialists, and Rade Tanasijević's Accord movement.

==== Čukarica ====
Results of the election for the Municipal Assembly of Čukarica:

Party	Votes	%	Seats
Aleksandar Vučić–Serbia Is Winning (Serbian Progressive Party, Social Democratic Party of Serbia, Party of United Pensioners of Serbia, Movement of Socialists, New Serbia, Serbian People's Party)	37,081	43.54	21
Enough Is Enough–Saša Radulović	10,600	12.45	6
Democratic Čukarica–Zoran Alimpić Democratic Party, SDS–Boris Tadić–New Party	10,383	12.19	6
Dveri–DSS–For a Growing Čukarica–Uroš Janković	8,085	9.49	4
Dr. Vojislav Šešelj–Serbian Radical Party	7,955	9.34	4
Ivica Dačić–"Socialist Party of Serbia (SPS), United Serbia (JS)"	7,608	8.93	4
Alliance for a Better Serbia–Čedomir Jovanović, Liberal Democratic Party–Serbian Renewal Movement	1,991	2.34	–
Never in NATO–Movement for the Neutrality of Serbia–People's Alliance–Vladan Glišić	1,455	1.71	–
Total	85,158	100.00	45
Valid votes	85,158	97.37	
Invalid/blank votes	2,303	2.63	
Total votes	87,461	100.00	
Registered voters/turnout	169,561	51.58	

Incumbent mayor Srđan Kolarić of the Progressive Party was confirmed for another term in office after the election, with the support of twenty-nine delegates. The local governing alliance consisted of the Progressives, Socialists, and Radicals.

==== Grocka ====
Results of the election for the Municipal Assembly of Grocka:

Party	Votes	%	Seats
Aleksandar Vučić–Serbia Is Winning (Serbian Progressive Party, Social Democratic Party of Serbia, Party of United Pensioners of Serbia, Movement of Socialists)	16,800	45.90	20
Ivica Dačić–Socialist Party of Serbia (SPS), United Serbia (JS)–Dragan Marković Palma	4,208	11.50	5
Our Man–Blažo Stojanović	2,856	7.80	3
Dr. Vojislav Šešelj–Serbian Radical Party	2,546	6.96	3
Patriotic Bloc Grocka–For Our Place, Together We Can Do Better (Serbian Monarchist Party, Democratic Party of Serbia)	2,012	5.50	2
New Serbia–Vesna Tasev Pekarski	2,010	5.49	2
DS–Goran Marković	1,846	5.04	–
Enough Is Enough–Saša Radulović	1,480	4.04	–
To Ask the People–SDS Boris Tadić–SNP Nenad Popović	1,279	3.49	–
Serbian Movement Dveri–Boško Obradović	1,139	3.11	–
Dialogue–Andrija Milić	425	1.16	–
Total	36,601	100.00	35
Valid votes	36,601	96.43	
Invalid/blank votes	1,354	3.57	
Total votes	37,955	100.00	
Registered voters/turnout	71,530	53.06	

The DS list did not receive five per cent of all votes cast and so did not cross the electoral threshold.

Dragoljub Simonović of the Progressive Party was chosen as mayor after the election. He resigned amid controversy in March 2019 and was replaced by Živadinka Avramović.

==== Lazarevac ====
Results of the election for the Municipal Assembly of Lazarevac:

Party	Votes	%	Seats
Aleksandar Vučić–Serbia Is Winning (Serbian Progressive Party, Party of United Pensioners of Serbia, Movement of Socialists, New Serbia, Serbian People's Party)	12,117	35.58	27
Citizens' Group: Lazarevac–Our Home–Milan Đorđević-Đokin	7,136	20.95	16
Ivica Dačić–Socialist Party of Serbia (SPS), United Serbia (JS)–Dragan Alimpijević-Cipi	3,683	10.81	8
Democratic Party–Dr. Ivko Marić	2,487	7.30	5
Lazarevac Fan Club–Milan Ralić Čombe	1,988	5.84	4
Dveri–Democratic Party of Serbia–Sanda Rašković Ivić–Boško Obradović	1,668	4.90	–
Dr. Vojislav Šešelj–Serbian Radical Party	1,531	4.50	–
Enough Is Enough–Saša Radulović	1,264	3.71	–
For the Lazarevac You Deserve–Aleksandar Dražić	851	2.50	–
Green Party (Green Party, Slovak Party)	795	2.33	1
Boris Tadić Social Democratic Party	537	1.58	–
Total	34,057	100.00	61
Valid votes	34,057	96.77	
Invalid/blank votes	1,137	3.23	
Total votes	35,194	100.00	
Registered voters/turnout	51,931	67.77	

Bojan Sinđelić of the Progressive Party was selected as mayor after the election, with the support of thirty-five delegates (out of thirty-nine who attended the session). The members of the Lazarevac–Out Home list were not present for the vote. Although the selection of a Progressive Party representative as mayor was expected, the choice of Sinđelić was surprising to many.

==== Mladenovac ====
Results of the election for the Municipal Assembly of Mladenovac:

Party	Votes	%	Seats
Aleksandar Vučić–Serbia Is Winning (Serbian Progressive Party, Social Democratic Party of Serbia, Movement of Socialists, Serbian Renewal Movement)	12,176	48.21	29
Beli – Go Hard!–Luka Maksimović (Sarmu probo nisi)	5,190	20.55	12
For a Just Mladenovac–Dejan Čokić–Democratic Party (Democratic Party, New Party)	2,876	11.39	7
Ivica Dačić–"Socialist Party of Serbia (SPS), United Serbia (JS)–Dragan Marković Palma"	1,807	7.16	4
Count on Us–SDS–Boris Tadić, LDP–Čedomir Jovanović	1,315	5.21	3
Dr. Vojislav Šešelj–Serbian Radical Party	1,216	4.81	–
Dveri–DSS Mr. Duśan Stojković	675	2.67	–
Total	25,255	100.00	55
Valid votes	25,255	96.79	
Invalid/blank votes	838	3.21	
Total votes	26,093	100.00	
Registered voters/turnout	47,005	55.51	

Vladan Glišić of the Progressive Party (not to be confused with the future parliamentarian of the same name) was chosen as mayor after the election, with the support of thirty-eight delegates. The Socialist Party supported the administration.

==== New Belgrade ====
Results of the election for the Municipal Assembly of New Belgrade:

Party	Votes	%	Seats
Aleksandar Šapić–For Mayor of the Municipality of New Belgrade	40,003	35.88	21
Aleksandar Vučić–Serbia Is Winning (Serbian Progressive Party, Social Democratic Party of Serbia, Party of United Pensioners of Serbia, Movement of Socialists)	31,422	28.18	17
Enough Is Enough–Saša Radulović	9,827	8.81	5
For a Just Serbia–Democratic Party (Democratic Party, New Party)	6,718	6.03	3
Dr. Vojislav Šešelj–Serbian Radical Party	6,459	5.79	3
Ivica Dačić–Socialist Party of Serbia (SPS), United Serbia (JS)	5,475	4.91	–
Dveri–Democratic Party of Serbia–New Team for New Belgrade	4,944	4.43	–
Boris Tadić, Čedomir Jovanović–Alliance for a Better Serbia–Liberal Democratic Party, Social Democratic Party	3,012	2.70	–
Borko Stefanović–Serbian Left for New Belgrade	1,670	1.50	–
For Bežanija, B. Kosa, Blokovi, and Ledine	1,261	1.13	–
Despite–Unanimously for New Belgrade–Borisav Radosavljević	710	0.64	–
Total	111,501	100.00	49
Valid votes	111,501	97.08	
Invalid/blank votes	3,354	2.92	
Total votes	114,855	100.00	
Registered voters/turnout	213,920	53.69	

Incumbent mayor Aleksandar Šapić was confirmed for another term in office with the support of twenty-six out of forty-seven delegates.

Branka Stamenković was elected from the fourth position on the Enough Is Enough list.

Nada Kolundžija of the Democratic Party was elected from the third position on the For a Just Serbia list. She resigned her seat on 20 July 2016.

==== Obrenovac ====
Results of the election for the Municipal Assembly of Obrenovac:

Party	Votes	%	Seats
Aleksandar Vučić–Serbia Is Winning (Serbian Progressive Party, Social Democratic Party of Serbia, Party of United Pensioners of Serbia, Movement of Socialists)	17,967	49.93	33
For an Independent Obrenovac–DS–SDS–Slobodan Molerović	4,047	11.25	7
Socialist Party of Serbia (SPS)–Ivica Dačić	3,753	10.43	6
Citizens' Group: Obrenovac–Our City–Svetozar Dobrašinović-Toza	2,373	6.59	4
Dr. Vojislav Šešelj–Serbian Radical Party	2,285	6.35	4
Citizens' Group: Private Citizens of Obrenovac–Bistro	1,807	5.02	–
Enough Is Enough–Saša Radulović	1,416	3.94	–
Serbian Movement Dveri–Democratic Party of Serbia	1,280	3.56	–
Russian Party Obrenovac–Milan Vučićević-Vučko	544	1.51	1
Dragan Marković Palma–United Serbia	512	1.42	–
Total	35,984	100.00	55
Valid votes	35,984	96.96	
Invalid/blank votes	1,129	3.04	
Total votes	37,113	100.00	
Registered voters/turnout	65,958	56.27	

The Private Citizens of Obrenovac list did not receive five per cent of the total vote and so did not cross the electoral threshold.

Incumbent mayor Miroslav Čučković of the Progressive Party was confirmed for another term in office after the election.

==== Palilula ====
Results of the election for the Municipal Assembly of Palilula:

Party	Votes	%	Seats
Aleksandar Vučić–Serbia Is Winning (Serbian Progressive Party, Party of United Pensioners of Serbia, Movement of Socialists, Social Democratic Party of Serbia, Serbian People's Party)	35,301	44.47	27
For a Democratic Palilula–DS–SDS–LDP–Stojan Nikolić	14,874	18.74	11
Enough Is Enough–Saša Radulović	7,633	9.62	5
Dr. Vojislav Šešelj–Serbian Radical Party	6,880	8.67	5
Ivica Dačić–Socialist Party of Serbia (SPS), United Serbia (JS)	6,512	8.20	4
Dveri–DSS	4,723	5.95	3
Unanimously for Palilula–Vladan Glišić	985	1.24	–
Citizens of Serbia for Palilula	954	1.20	–
New Party–New Team for a Better Palilula	823	1.04	–
United Russian Party–Mr. Miodrag Dakić	456	0.57	–
Party of Russians of Serbia	245	0.31	–
Total	79,386	100.00	55
Valid votes	79,386	96.89	
Invalid/blank votes	2,545	3.11	
Total votes	81,931	100.00	
Registered voters/turnout	169,919	48.22	

Aleksandar Jovičić of the Progressive Party was selected as mayor after the election, which the support of thirty-four delegates. The local coalition government was formed by the Progressives, Socialists, and Radicals.

Future parliamentarian Đorđe Todorović was elected from the nineteenth position on the SNS's list.

==== Rakovica ====
Results of the election for the Municipal Assembly of Rakovica:

Party	Votes	%	Seats
Aleksandar Vučić–Serbia Is Winning (Serbian Progressive Party, Social Democratic Party of Serbia, Party of United Pensioners of Serbia)	23,563	45.78	25
Democrats Together (Democratic Party–Bojan Pajtić, SDS–Boris Tadić, LDP, Serbian Left)	6,331	12.30	6
Enough Is Enough–Saša Radulović	6,157	11.96	6
Ivica Dačić–Socialist Party of Serbia (SPS), United Serbia (JS)	5,366	10.43	5
Dr. Vojislav Šešelj–Serbian Radical Party	4,739	9.21	5
Dveri–Democratic Party of Serbia	3,614	7.02	3
Oathkeepers for Rakovica–Milica Đurđević	1,343	2.61	–
Blank Papers	357	0.69	–
Total	51,470	100.00	50
Valid votes	51,470	97.46	
Invalid/blank votes	1,340	2.54	
Total votes	52,810	100.00	
Registered voters/turnout	103,478	51.04	

Incumbent mayor Vladan Kocić of the Progressive party was confirmed for a new term in office, receiving the votes of thirty delegates. The local coalition government was formed by the Progressives and the Socialists. Zoran Krasić was elected at the head of the Radical Party list, although he resigned his mandate on 15 September 2016.

==== Savski Venac ====
Results of the election for the Municipal Assembly of Savski Venac:

Party	Votes	%	Seats
Aleksandar Vučić–Serbia Is Winning (Serbian Progressive Party, Party of United Pensioners of Serbia, Movement of Socialists, Social Democratic Party of Serbia, Serbian People's Party)	6,502	31.64	13
"Democratic Party–Social Democratic Party–Liberal Democratic Party–New Party–Dušan Dinčić"	4,538	22.08	9
Enough Is Enough–Saša Radulović	3,858	18.77	7
"Socialist Party of Serbia (SPS)"–Ivica Dačić	1,802	8.77	3
Dr. Vojislav Šešelj–Serbian Radical Party	1,467	7.14	2
Democratic Party of Serbia–Dveri	1,367	6.65	2
Let's Defeat the Parties, Let's Vote for the People–Local Self-Organization Savski Venac (Citizens' Party, Greeks of Serbia, Vlach Party)	782	3.81	1
New Serbia–Duško Jovanović	235	1.14	–
Total	20,551	100.00	37
Valid votes	20,551	97.76	
Invalid/blank votes	470	2.24	
Total votes	21,021	100.00	
Registered voters/turnout	42,348	49.64	

Irena Vujović of the Progressive Party was chosen as mayor after the election. The local coalition government included the Progressives and the Socialists. Social Democratic Party member Nenad Konstantinović was elected from the lead position on the Democratic Party alliance list; parliamentarian Nataša Vučković was re-elected as a Democratic Party candidate on the same list. Srđan Nogo, at the time a member of Dveri, appeared in the fifth position on the Democratic Party of Serbia–Dveri list and was not elected.

==== Sopot ====
Results of the election for the Municipal Assembly of Sopot:

Party	Votes	%	Seats
Aleksandar Vučić–Serbia Is Winning (Serbian Progressive Party)	6,448	70.86	25
Dr. Vojislav Šešelj–Serbian Radical Party	840	9.23	3
Ivica Dačić–Socialist Party of Serbia (SPS)	825	9.07	3
Democratic Party–Liberal Democratic Party–For My Place–We Know and We Can	758	8.33	2
For Sopot–SDS–Boris Tadić	229	2.52	–
Total	9,100	100.00	33
Valid votes	9,100	95.35	
Invalid/blank votes	444	4.65	
Total votes	9,544	100.00	
Registered voters/turnout	17,673	54.00	

Živorad Milosavljević of the Progressive Party, who had served as mayor of Sopot since 1989, was confirmed for another term in office after the election.

==== Stari Grad ====
Results of the election for the Municipal Assembly of Stari Grad:

Party	Votes	%	Seats
"Democratic Party–Keepers of Stari Grad–Marko Bastać" (Democratic Party, New Party)	9,227	33.06	20
Aleksandar Vučić–Serbia Is Winning (Serbian Progressive Party, Social Democratic Party of Serbia, Party of United Pensioners of Serbia, Movement of Socialists, Serbian Renewal Movement, Serbian People's Party)	6,694	23.99	14
Enough Is Enough–Saša Radulović	3,948	14.15	8
Democratic Party of Serbia–Dveri–Sanda Rašković Ivić	1,998	7.16	4
Ivica Dačić–"Socialist Party of Serbia (SPS) United Serbia (JS)"	1,794	6.43	4
Boris Tadić, Čedomir Jovanović–Alliance for a Better Serbia–LDP, SDS	1,694	6.07	3
Dr. Vojislav Šešelj–Serbian Radical Party	1,557	5.58	3
Duckling–No Belgrade Waterfront	430	1.54	–
Unanimously for Stari Grad–Vladan Glišić	327	1.17	–
"Čiča Gliša" (Montenegrin Party, Sandžak Raška Party)	237	0.85	–
Total	27,906	100.00	56
Valid votes	27,906	97.77	
Invalid/blank votes	637	2.23	
Total votes	28,543	100.00	
Registered voters/turnout	57,315	49.80	

Marko Bastać, at the time a member of the Democratic Party, was chosen as mayor by a secret ballot in May 2016 with the support of thirty-eight delegates. The Socialist Party participated in the local coalition government. The Progressives and Enough Is Enough subsequently indicated they would serve in opposition.

There was some ambiguity concerning the relationship between the Serbian Radical Party and the local government. In May 2016, the Radical Party's Belgrade president Miljan Damjanović announced that the Radicals would be joining the DS-led administration. The DS later denied that an agreement had been reached between the parties. Ljubiša Kukolj from the Radicals was included in the municipal council that was formed on 12 May 2016, although Bastać contended that this followed negotiations on an individual rather than a party level. After further controversy, Kukolj withdrew from council on 26 May 2016. This notwithstanding, the Radicals gave at least unofficial support to Bastać's administration afterward.

Future parliamentarian Uglješa Marković of the Socialist Party received a local assembly mandate on 29 September 2016 and served for the remainder of the term.

Bastać left the Democratic Party in December 2016 but continued to serve as mayor. He later joined the Party of Freedom and Justice in 2019 and became the president of its city board for Belgrade. He was removed from this role and the party's organization in Stari Grad was dissolved in June 2020, after Bastać chose to participate in that year's local elections in defiance of a party boycott.

==== Surčin ====
Results of the election for the Municipal Assembly of Surčin:

Party	Votes	%	Seats
Aleksandar Vučić–Serbia Is Winning (Serbian Progressive Party, Movement of Socialists)	11,399	51.25	21
Democratic Party–Vojislav Janošević, Vojislav Janošević	4,505	20.26	8
Dr. Vojislav Šešelj–Serbian Radical Party, Miroslav Malbaša	2,324	10.45	4
Ivica Dačić–Socialist Party of Serbia (SPS) United Serbia (JS)–Dragan Marković Palma, Vesna Šalović	1,522	6.84	2
Citizens' Group: Movement for a Rich Municipality of Surčin, Jovan Svetković	1,122	5.04	–
Dveri–DSS, Goran Ljiljanić	976	4.39	–
Boris Tadić, Čedomir Jovanović–Alliance for a Better Serbia–Social Democratic Party, Liberal Democratic Party, United Movement, Dušan Mitova	392	1.76	–
Total	22,240	100.00	35
Valid votes	22,240	96.63	
Invalid/blank votes	776	3.37	
Total votes	23,016	100.00	
Registered voters/turnout	37,995	60.58	

The Movement for a Rich Municipality of Surčin list did not receive five per cent of the total vote and so fell below the electoral threshold.

Stevan Šuša of the Progressive Party was subsequently chosen as mayor, with the support of twenty-two delegates.

==== Voždovac ====
Results of the election for the Municipal Assembly of Voždovac:

Party	Votes	%	Seats
Aleksandar Vučić–Serbia Is Winning (Serbian Progressive Party, Movement of Socialists, Party of United Pensioners of Serbia)	33,107	42.43	26
Enough Is Enough–Saša Radulović	10,789	13.83	8
For a Just Voždovac–Democratic Party–Goran Šević	7,572	9.70	6
Ivica Dačić–Socialist Party of Serbia (SPS)–United Serbia (JS)	6,537	8.38	5
Dr. Vojislav Šešelj–Serbian Radical Party	6,451	8.27	5
Dveri–Democratic Party of Serbia	6,195	7.94	5
Alliance for a Better Voždovac–Boris Tadić, Čedomir Jovanović–SDS, LDP	3,472	4.45	–
Oathkeepers–Stevan Radović	1,572	2.01	–
Good for Voždovac	1,069	1.37	–
Social Justice for All–Nemanja Veljić	859	1.10	–
Democratic Alternative–For a Better Voždovac, Adelita Radičević	407	0.52	–
Total	78,030	100.00	55
Valid votes	78,030	97.17	
Invalid/blank votes	2,269	2.83	
Total votes	80,299	100.00	
Registered voters/turnout	161,072	49.85	

Incumbent mayor Aleksandar Savić of the Progressive Party was confirmed for another term in office after the election, by a vote of thirty-nine to fifteen. The local administration was supported by the Progressives, Socialists, and Radicals, as well as the Our Voždovac group (which split from the Dveri–Democratic Party of Serbia list).

==== Vračar ====
Results of the election for the Municipal Assembly of Vračar:

Party	Votes	%	Seats
Free Vračar Bane Kuzmanović Democratic Party + Social Democratic Party + Liberal Democratic Party + New Party + Social Democratic Union + Serbian Left	10,323	31.52	17
Aleksandar Vučić–Serbia Is Winning (Serbian Progressive Party, Social Democratic Party of Serbia, Party of United Pensioners of Serbia, Movement of Socialists)	9,336	28.51	16
Enough Is Enough–Saša Radulović	4,561	13.93	7
Socialist Party of Serbia (SPS)–Ivica Dačić	2,139	6.53	3
Democratic Party of Serbia–Dveri	1,712	5.23	2
Dr. Vojislav Šešelj–Serbian Radical Party	1,593	4.86	–
Vračar Vračarians-Vračar Beautification Association	1,588	4.85	–
Green Party	532	1.62	–
Unanimously for Vračar–Vladan Glišić–Nenad Popović–Miroslav Parović	385	1.18	–
Duckling–No Belgrade Waterfront	382	1.17	–
None of the Above	200	0.61	–
Total	32,751	100.00	45
Valid votes	32,751	98.01	
Invalid/blank votes	665	1.99	
Total votes	33,416	100.00	
Registered voters/turnout	63,948	52.25	

The Free Vračar alliance did not remain united after the election, and Milan Nedeljković of the Progressive Party was selected as mayor with the support of twenty-three delegates. The local coalition government was formed by the Progressive Party, the Socialist Party, the Liberal Democratic Party, and the Democratic Party of Serbia. The opposition parties boycotted the vote.

Vojin Biljić was elected from the fifth position on the Enough Is Enough list.

==== Zemun ====
Results of the election for the Municipal Assembly of Zemun:

Party	Votes	%	Seats
Aleksandar Vučić–Serbia Is Winning (Serbian Progressive Party, Social Democratic Party of Serbia, Party of United Pensioners of Serbia, Movement of Socialists, New Serbia, Serbian People's Party)	35,692	45.74	32
Dr. Vojislav Šešelj–Serbian Radical Party	10,325	13.23	9
Enough Is Enough–Saša Radulović	7,045	9.03	6
Ivica Dačić–Socialist Party of Serbia (SPS), United Serbia (JS)	6,015	7.71	5
Democratic Party–(Democratic Party–New Party)	4,291	5.50	3
Boris Tadić, Čedomir Jovanović–Alliance for a Better Zemun–Social Democratic Party, Liberal Democratic Party	3,611	4.63	–
Dveri–Democratic Party of Serbia–Front for Zemun	3,214	4.12	–
Locally United for Zemun and Batajnica–Prof. Dr. Danica Grujičić (United Russian Party, Vlach Party)	1,724	2.21	1
Citizens' Group: Zemun, a Matter of the Heart (Serbian Party Oathkeepers, Serbian Patriotic Front)	1,370	1.76	–
Green Party	1,317	1.69	1
Enough of the Robbery, Corruption, and Theft–Milorad Radulović	1,263	1.62	–
None of the Above–Nenad Vidović	1,107	1.42	–
Serbian-Russian Movement–Slobodan Dimitrijević	643	0.82	–
Srpska Krajina in Their Hearts	417	0.53	–
Total	78,034	100.00	57
Valid votes	78,034	97.34	
Invalid/blank votes	2,134	2.66	
Total votes	80,168	100.00	
Registered voters/turnout	160,782	49.86	

Incumbent mayor Dejan Matić of the Progressive Party was confirmed for a new term in office after the election. The Serbia Is Winning list formed a local coalition government with the Radical Party. Aleksandar Šešelj, who was elected to the assembly at the head of the Radical Party list, served as a member of the municipal council (i.e., the executive branch of the government) from 17 June 2016 to 27 October 2017.

==== Zvezdara ====
Results of the election for the Municipal Assembly of Zvezdara:

Party	Votes	%	Seats
Aleksandar Vučić–Serbia Is Winning (Serbian Progressive Party, Social Democratic Party of Serbia, Party of United Pensioners of Serbia, Movement of Socialists)	26,688	37.15	21
Democratic Party–For the Sake of Zvezdara (Democratic Party, New Party)	9,316	12.97	7
Enough Is Enough–Saša Radulović	8,925	12.42	7
Ivica Dačić–Socialist Party of Serbia (SPS)–United Serbia (JS)–Dragan Marković Palma	6,600	9.19	5
Dr. Vojislav Šešelj–Serbian Radical Party	5,353	7.45	4
DSS–Dveri	4,674	6.51	3
Boris Tadić, Čedomir Jovanović–Alliance for a Better Serbia–Social Democratic Party, Liberal Democratic Party	3,922	5.46	3
Citizens' Group: Mirijevo	3,701	5.15	3
For a Better Zvezdara–My Zvezdara–Miljan Stojanović	1,303	1.81	–
Unanimously for Zvezdara–Vladan Glišić	1,130	1.57	–
Serbian Monarchist Party "Serbian Concord"–Ljubomir Simić	223	0.31	–
Total	71,835	100.00	53
Valid votes	71,835	97.24	
Invalid/blank votes	2,040	2.76	
Total votes	73,875	100.00	
Registered voters/turnout	151,346	48.81	

Miloš Ignjatović of the Progressive Party was chosen as mayor after the election, with the support of twenty-nine delegates. The government was supported by the Socialists and the Mirijevo list.

Radmila Vasić was elected from the third position on the DSS–Dveri list.

Aleksandra Tomić was elected from the lead position on the Progressive Party's list. She resigned her seat on 29 September 2016.

=== Vojvodina ===
==== Central Banat District ====
Local elections were held in the one city (Zrenjanin) and all four of the municipalities in the Central Banat District. The Progressive Party and its allies won majority victories in Zrenjanin and Sečanj and plurality victories in Novi Bečej and Žitište. An independent list won the election in Nova Crnja; the leader of the list joined the Progressive Party after the election.

===== Zrenjanin =====
Results of the election for the City Assembly of Zrenjanin:

Party	Votes	%	Seats
Aleksandar Vučić–Serbia Is Winning (Serbian Progressive Party, Social Democratic Party of Serbia, Party of United Pensioners of Serbia, Serbian Renewal Movement)	23,156	43.12	35
"Ivica Dačić"–Socialist Party of Serbia (SPS), United Serbia (JS) Dragan Marković Palma, People's Movement of Serbia (NPS), Russian Democratic Party (RDS)–Željko Malušić	6,174	11.50	9
League of Social Democrats of Vojvodina–Nenad Čanak	4,987	9.29	7
Dr. Vojislav Šešelj–Serbian Radical Party	3,337	6.21	5
Enough Is Enough–Saša Radulović	3,282	6.11	5
Democratic Party–Dr. Gordana Kozlovački	2,817	5.25	4
Boris Tadić, Čedomir Jovanović–Alliance for a Better Zrenjanin (Social Democratic Party, Liberal Democratic Party, Vojvodina's Party)	1,974	3.68	–
Dveri–DSS–Patriotic Bloc Zrenjanin	1,883	3.51	–
Alliance of Vojvodina Hungarians–István Pásztor	1,818	3.39	2
Serbian Left Zrenjanin–Borko Stefanović–Serbia for All of Us	1,011	1.88	–
Our City Our Thing–Fight For Water	887	1.65	–
"Zrenjanin Capital of Vojvodina" (Roma Party, Bunjevci Party–Citizens of Serbia)	656	1.22	–
Russian Party–Ljubomir Putić	535	1.00	–
People's Movement Dinara-Drina-Danube–Nada Babić	515	0.96	–
"Citizens of Serbia" (Democratic Movement of Romanians of Serbia, Party of Russians of Serbia)	418	0.78	–
Republican Party–Eržebet Popov	257	0.48	–
Total	53,707	100.00	67
Valid votes	53,707	97.18	
Invalid/blank votes	1,558	2.82	
Total votes	55,265	100.00	
Registered voters/turnout	106,692	51.80	

Incumbent mayor Čedomir Janjić of the Progressive Party was confirmed in office after the election, with the support of the Socialists and the Alliance of Vojvodina Hungarians.

===== Nova Crnja =====
Results of the election for the Municipal Assembly of Nova Crnja:

Party	Votes	%	Seats
Citizens' Group: Pera Milankov	1,904	31.42	9
Aleksandar Vučić–Serbia Is Winning (Serbian Progressive Party, Social Democratic Party of Serbia, Party of United Pensioners of Serbia, Serbian People's Party)	1,480	24.42	7
"Ivica Dačić–Socialist Party of Serbia (SPS), United Serbia (JS)"	1,104	18.22	5
Alliance of Vojvodina Hungarians–István Pásztor	561	9.26	2
Nova Crnja Our Home–Democratic Party–League of Social Democrats of Vojvodina–Vladan Radin Madrida	395	6.52	2
Social Democratic Party–Russian Democratic Party–Boris Tadić	210	3.47	–
Dr. Vojislav Šešelj–Serbian Radical Party	198	3.27	–
United Russian Party–Zoran Marić	107	1.77	–
Dveri	101	1.67	–
Total	6,060	100.00	25
Valid votes	6,060	96.36	
Invalid/blank votes	229	3.64	
Total votes	6,289	100.00	
Registered voters/turnout	8,716	72.15	

Incumbent mayor Pera Milankov joined the Progressive Party after the election and was confirmed for another term as mayor. In 2018, he was convicted of giving and accepting bribes and given a prison sentence of one year and ten months; as the sentence was not final pending an appeal, he continued to serve as mayor. He was dismissed in June 2019 and replaced by fellow Progressive Party member Vladimir Brakus.

Attila Juhász was elected from the lead position on the VMSZ list. He resigned his seat on 18 August 2016.

===== Novi Bečej =====
Results of the election for the Municipal Assembly of Novi Bečej:

Party	Votes	%	Seats
Aleksandar Vučić–Serbia Is Winning (Serbian Progressive Party, Social Democratic Party of Serbia, Party of United Pensioners of Serbia)	4,840	37.70	14
League of Social Democrats of Vojvodina–Nenad Čanak (League of Social Democrats of Vojvodina, Serbian People's Party)	2,509	19.55	7
Miša Vrebalov–Milivoj Vrebalov	2,306	17.96	6
"Dr. Vojislav Šešelj–Serbian Radical Party"	1,157	9.01	3
Alliance of Vojvodina Hungarians–István Pásztor (Alliance of Vojvodina Hungarians, Hungarian Unity Party)	559	4.35	1
"Ivica Dačić"–Socialist Party of Serbia (SPS)"	547	4.26	–
The Power of Youth	480	3.74	–
Enough Is Enough–Saša Radulović	439	3.42	–
Total	12,837	100.00	31
Valid votes	12,567	97.05	
Invalid/blank votes	382	2.95	
Total votes	12,949	100.00	
Registered voters/turnout	19,995	64.76	

Saša Maksimović of the Progressive Party was chosen as mayor after the election, with support from the Alliance of Vojvodina Hungarians and members of Milovoj Vrebalov's group.

Ivica Milankov was elected from the lead position on the Radical Party's list.

===== Sečanj =====
Results of the election for the Municipal Assembly of Sečanj:

Party	Votes	%	Seats
Aleksandar Vučić–Serbia Is Winning (Serbian Progressive Party)	3,162	44.71	12
Socialist Party of Serbia	1,545	21.84	6
Third Serbia BS–Miroslav Papović	830	11.73	3
Dr. Vojislav Šešelj–Serbian Radical Party	543	7.68	2
Citizens' Group	326	4.61	–
League of Social Democrats of Vojvodina–Nenad Čanak	262	3.70	–
Alliance of Vojvodina Hungarians–István Pásztor	150	2.12	–
Democratic Party–Democratic Party of Serbia	139	1.97	–
Roma Party, Bunjevci Party–Citizens of Serbia	116	1.64	–
Total	7,073	100.00	23
Valid votes	7,073	96.90	
Invalid/blank votes	226	3.10	
Total votes	7,299	100.00	
Registered voters/turnout	11,370	64.20	

Incumbent mayor Predrag Milošević of the Progressive Party was confirmed for another term in office after the election. He died on 15 April 2017 and was replaced by Predrag Rađenović, also of the Progressive Party.

===== Žitište =====
Results of the election for the Municipal Assembly of Žitište:

Party	Votes	%	Seats
Aleksandar Vučić–Serbia Is Winning (Serbian Progressive Party, Social Democratic Party of Serbia, Serbian Renewal Movement)	2,797	31.02	11
"Igor Salak–It's Time for Better" (Democratic Party and SDS)	1,910	21.18	8
"Ivica Dačić–Socialist Party of Serbia (SPS), Democratic Party of Serbia (DSS), Serbian People's Party (SNP)"	1,439	15.96	6
Alliance of Vojvodina Hungarians–István Pásztor	712	7.90	2
Our Villages, Our Responsibilities–Vojislav Mrkšić	690	7.65	2
League of Social Democrats of Vojvodina–Nenad Čanak	518	5.74	2
"Dr. Vojislav Šešelj–Serbian Radical Party"	376	4.17	–
"Movement of Socialists–Divna Sakradžija"	308	3.42	–
Dveri–Željko Bandić	268	2.97	–
Total	9,018	100.00	31
Valid votes	9,018	96.30	
Invalid/blank votes	346	3.70	
Total votes	9,364	100.00	
Registered voters/turnout	14,924	62.74	

Incumbent mayor Mitar Vučurević of the Progressive Party was confirmed for another term in office after the election.

==== North Bačka District ====
Local elections were held in the one city (Subotica) and both of the municipalities in the North Bačka District. The Progressive Party won plurality victories in Subotica and Mali Iđoš, while the Alliance of Vojvodina Hungarians was successful in Bačka Topola (where the Progressives joined a coalition government after the election).

===== Subotica =====
Results of the election for the City Assembly of Subotica:

Party	Votes	%	Seats
Aleksandar Vučić—Serbia Is Winning (Serbian Progressive Party, Social Democratic Party of Serbia, Movement of Socialists, New Serbia, Party of United Pensioners of Serbia, Serbian Renewal Movement, Third Serbia)	23,685	38.51	31
Alliance of Vojvodina Hungarians–István Pásztor	8,724	14.19	11
Jenö Maglai–Movement of Subotica Citizens Maglai Jenö	8,240	13.40	11
For a Just Subotica–Democratic Party (Democratic Alliance of Croats in Vojvodina, LDP, Nova)	5,275	8.58	7
League of Social Democrats of Vojvodina–Nenad Čanak, Social Democratic Party–Boris Tadić, Green Ecological Party-The Greens	3,636	5.91	4
Enough Is Enough–Saša Radulović	2,984	4.85	–
Ivica Dačić–Socialist Party of Serbia (SPS), United Serbia (JS) Dragan Marković Palma, Communist Party (KP)	2,628	4.27	–
Serbian Radical Party, Dveri, Democratic Party of Serbia (DSS)–Nemanja Šarčević	2,568	4.18	–
Alliance of Bačka Bunjevci–Mirko Bajić	1,454	2.36	1
Russian Party	935	1.52	1
Vojvodina Tolerance (Montenegrin Party, Sandžak Raška Party)	832	1.35	1
Citizens of Serbia (Roma Party, Bunjevci Citizens of Serbia)	538	0.87	–
Total	61,499	100.00	67
Valid votes	61,499	96.93	
Invalid/blank votes	1,951	3.07	
Total votes	63,450	100.00	
Registered voters/turnout	130,789	48.51	

Bogdan Laban of the Serbian Progressive Party was chosen as mayor after the election. The Progressives and their allies governed in a coalition that included the Alliance of Vojvodina Hungarians.

Tomislav Žigmanov, the leader of the Democratic Alliance of Croats in Vojvodina, was elected from the second position on the Democratic Party's list.

===== Bačka Topola =====
Results of the election for the Municipal Assembly of Bačka Topola:

Party	Votes	%	Seats
Alliance of Vojvodina Hungarians–Democratic Party of Vojvodina Hungarians–István Pásztor	4,682	33.10	15
Aleksandar Vučić—Serbia Is Winning (Serbian Progressive Party, Social Democratic Party of Serbia, Serbian Renewal Movement)	3,769	26.65	12
Citizens' Alliance–Civil	1,351	9.55	4
Ivica Dačić–Socialist Party of Serbia (SPS), United Serbia (JS) Dragan Marković Palma	1,172	8.29	4
"Hungarian Movement–For Our Municipality–DZVM"	1,091	7.71	3
League of Social Democrats of Vojvodina–Nenad Čanak, Social Democratic Party–Boris Tadić	1,016	7.18	3
Serbian Radical Party–Democratic Party of Serbia–Dveri	558	3.95	–
Democratic Party	504	3.56	–
Total	14,143	100.00	41
Valid votes	14,143	96.24	
Invalid/blank votes	553	3.76	
Total votes	14,696	100.00	
Registered voters/turnout	30,124	48.79	

Incumbent mayor Gábor Kislinder of the Alliance of Vojvodina Hungarians was confirmed for a new term in office after the election. The government was formed by the Alliance of Vojvodina Hungarians and the Serbian Progressive Party.

===== Mali Iđoš =====
Results of the election for the Municipal Assembly of Mali Iđoš:

Party	Votes	%	Seats
Aleksandar Vučić—Serbia Is Winning (Serbian Progressive Party, Social Democratic Party of Serbia, Party of United Pensioners of Serbia)	2,181	38.10	10
Alliance of Vojvodina Hungarians–István Pásztor	1,729	30.21	8
Marko Rovčanin–Socialist Party of Serbia (SPS)	1,390	24.28	6
Montenegrin Party–Nenad Stevović	424	7.41	1
Total	5,724	100.00	25
Valid votes	5,724	95.77	
Invalid/blank votes	253	4.23	
Total votes	5,977	100.00	
Registered voters/turnout	10,615	56.31	

Marko Lazić of the Progressive Party was chosen as mayor after the election.

==== North Banat District ====
Local elections were held in the one city (Kikinda) and all five municipalities of the North Banat District. The Progressive Party and its allies won a majority victory in Kikinda as well as plurality victories in Čoka and Novi Kneževac, forming government in all three jurisdictions. The Alliance of Vojvodina Hungarians won plurality victories Kanjiža and Senta and in both cases formed a coalition government with the Progressives. An independent list won in Ada; its leader joined the Progressives later in the year.

===== Kikinda =====
Results of the election for the City Assembly of Kikinda:

Party	Votes	%	Seats
Aleksandar Vučić–Serbia Is Winning (Serbian Progressive Party, Social Democratic Party of Serbia, Party of United Pensioners of Serbia, Movement of Socialists)	15,398	50.97	26
Ivica Dačić–Socialist Party of Serbia (SPS)	2,607	8.63	4
League of Social Democrats of Vojvodina–Nenad Čanak	2,330	7.71	4
Let's Defend Kikinda–Democratic Party, Social Democratic Party, Liberal Democratic Party, Vojvodina's Party–Viktor Felbab	2,305	7.63	3
Alliance of Vojvodina Hungarians–István Pásztor	1,522	5.04	2
Enough Is Enough–Saša Radulović	1,482	4.91	–
Dr. Vojislav Šešelj–Serbian Radical Party	1,430	4.73	–
Serbian People's Party–Nenad Popović–United Serbia–Dragoljub Ćosić	1,405	4.65	–
Dveri–Democratic Party of Serbia–Sanda Rašković Ivić–Boško Obradović	957	3.17	–
Green Party	440	1.46	–
People's Movement Dinara-Drina-Danube–Tomislav Bokan	333	1.10	–
Total	30,209	100.00	39
Valid votes	30,209	97.27	
Invalid/blank votes	848	2.73	
Total votes	31,057	100.00	
Registered voters/turnout	51,352	60.48	

Incumbent mayor Pavle Markov of the Progressive Party was confirmed for another term in office after the election. The Alliance of Vojvodina Hungarians participated in the city's coalition government.

Milenko Jovanov of the Progressive Party was re-elected to the assembly from the eleventh position on the Serbia Is Winning list.

===== Ada =====
Results of the election for the Municipal Assembly of Ada:

Party	Votes	%	Seats
Citizens' Group: For Our Municipality: We Justify Your Trust	5,061	63.36	19
Aleksandar Vučić–Serbia Is Winning (Serbian Progressive Party, Party of United Pensioners of Serbia)	1,309	16.39	4
Alliance of Vojvodina Hungarians–István Pásztor	1,084	13.57	4
DZVM–Hungarian Movement–For Change!	534	6.69	2
Total	7,988	100.00	29
Valid votes	7,988	96.87	
Invalid/blank votes	258	3.13	
Total votes	8,246	100.00	
Registered voters/turnout	15,848	52.03	

Incumbent mayor Zoltán Bilicki of the For Our Municipality list was confirmed for another term in office after the election. He joined the Progressive Party in December 2016. József Tóbiás was appointed to the municipal council after the election.

===== Čoka =====
Results of the election for the Municipal Assembly of Čoka:

Party	Votes	%	Seats
Aleksandar Vučić–Serbia Is Winning (Serbian Progressive Party)	2,050	38.68	11
Alliance of Vojvodina Hungarians–István Pásztor	1,744	32.91	9
Democratic Party–Boris Ilić	615	11.60	3
League of Social Democrats of Vojvodina–Nenad Čanak	373	7.04	1
Ivica Dačić–Socialist Party of Serbia (SPS)	230	4.34	–
Serbian-Russian Movement–Igor Smiljković	185	3.49	–
Movement of Socialists–Aleksandar Vulin	103	1.94	–
Total	5,300	100.00	24
Valid votes	5,300	96.38	
Invalid/blank votes	199	3.62	
Total votes	5,499	100.00	
Registered voters/turnout	9,754	56.38	

Stana Đember of the Progressive Party was chosen as mayor after the election. The government was formed by the Progressives and the Alliance of Vojvodina Hungarians.

===== Kanjiža =====
Results of the election for the Municipal Assembly of Kanjiža:

Party	Votes	%	Seats
Alliance of Vojvodina Hungarians–István Pásztor	3,969	38.86	12
Ukrok–United for the Municipality of Kanjiža–Tandari	1,989	19.48	6
Hungarian Movement–Differently From Now On–Halas Monika (Democratic Fellowship of Vojvodina Hungarians, Hungarian Movement)	1,941	19.01	5
Aleksandar Vučić–Serbia Is Winning (Serbian Progressive Party)	1,729	16.93	5
Vojvodina's Tolerance (Montenegrin Party, Sandžak–Raška Party)	397	3.89	1
Active Serbia–Dr. Dušan Janjić	188	1.84	–
Total	10,213	100.00	29
Valid votes	10,213	96.04	
Invalid/blank votes	421	3.96	
Total votes	10,634	100.00	
Registered voters/turnout	22,731	46.78	

Róbert Fejsztámer of the Alliance of Vojvodina Hungarians was chosen as mayor after the election. The Progressive Party participated in the local government.

===== Novi Kneževac =====
Results of the election for the Municipal Assembly of Novi Kneževac:

Party	Votes	%	Seats
Aleksandar Vučić–Serbia Is Winning (Serbian Progressive Party)	2,800	48.22	15
Alliance of Vojvodina Hungarians–István Pásztor	1,303	22.44	7
Democratic Party	936	16.12	5
"Ivica Dačić–Socialist Party of Serbia (SPS)"	404	6.96	2
League of Social Democrats of Vojvodina–Nenad Čanak	364	6.27	2
Total	5,807	100.00	31
Valid votes	5,807	96.38	
Invalid/blank votes	218	3.62	
Total votes	6,025	100.00	
Registered voters/turnout	9,424	63.93	

Radovan Uverić of the Progressive Party was chosen as mayor after the election.

===== Senta =====
Results of the election for the Municipal Assembly of Senta:

Party	Votes	%	Seats
Alliance of Vojvodina Hungarians–István Pásztor	2,841	33.64	11
Aleksandar Vučić–Serbia Is Winning (Serbian Progressive Party, Social Democratic Party of Serbia, Party of United Pensioners of Serbia, Movement of Socialists, New Serbia, Serbian Renewal Movement, Serbian People's Party)	1,517	17.96	5
Anikó Zsíros Jankelić–We Have Proven Ourselves by Our Work–Democratic Party	1,440	17.05	5
Hungarian Movement–For Change!–Zsoldos Ferenc (Democratic Fellowship of Vojvodina Hungarians, Hungarian Movement)	1,341	15.88	5
Zenta a Zentalake - Senta Sećanima–László Rác Szabó (Hungarian Civic Alliance)	934	11.06	3
"Ivica Dačić–Socialist Party of Serbia (SPS)"	373	4.42	–
Total	8,446	100.00	29
Valid votes	8,446	97.16	
Invalid/blank votes	247	2.84	
Total votes	8,693	100.00	
Registered voters/turnout	21,291	40.83	

Incumbent mayor Rudolf Czegledi of the Alliance of Vojvodina Hungarians was confirmed for another term in office after the election. The Progressive Party participated in the local government.

==== South Bačka District ====
Local elections were held in the one city (Novi Sad) and ten of the eleven separate municipalities of the South Bačka District. The exception was Vrbas, which was on a different four-year electoral cycle at the time.

The City of Novi Sad comprises two municipalities (the City municipality of Novi Sad and Petrovaradin), although their powers are very limited relative to the city government. Unlike Belgrade, Niš, and Vranje, Novi Sad does not have directly elected municipal assemblies.

The Progressive Party and its allies placed first in all cities and municipalities that held elections, and members of the Progressive Party were subsequently chosen as mayors in all jurisdictions.

===== Novi Sad =====
Results of the election for the City Assembly of Novi Sad:

Party	Votes	%	Seats
Aleksandar Vučić–Serbia Is Winning (Serbian Progressive Party, New Serbia, Party of United Pensioners of Serbia, Social Democratic Party of Serbia, Movement of Socialists)	70,084	41.30	38
Enough Is Enough–Saša Radulović	16,841	9.93	9
Dr. Vojislav Šešelj–Serbian Radical Party	14,800	8.72	8
Ivica Dačić–Socialist Party of Serbia (SPS)–United Serbia (JS)–Dragan Marković Palma	14,336	8.45	7
League of Social Democrats of Vojvodina–Nenad Čanak	12,602	7.43	7
Democratic Party–Dr. Veljko Krstonošić	11,748	6.92	6
People's Movement Dinara-Drina-Danube–Tomislav Bokan	7,414	4.37	–
Dveri–DSS–Sanda Rašković Ivić–Boško Obradović	6,434	3.79	–
Boris Tadić, Čedomir Jovanović–Alliance for a Better Novi Sad (Social Democratic Party, Liberal Democratic Party and Green Ecological Party-The Greens)	3,802	2.24	–
Green Party (Green Party, Slovak Party)	2,787	1.64	1
Serbian Left–Borko Stefanović	2,628	1.55	–
Alliance of Vojvodina Hungarians–István Pásztor	2,462	1.45	1
None of the Above	1,982	1.17	1
Serbian-Russian Movement–Slobodan Dimitrijević	890	0.52	–
United Russian Party–Zoran Marić	443	0.26	–
Republican Party–Ljubomir Čirilović	428	0.25	–
Total	169,681	100.00	78
Valid votes	169,681	97.72	
Invalid/blank votes	3,965	2.28	
Total votes	173,646	100.00	
Registered voters/turnout	315,741	55.00	

Incumbent mayor Miloš Vučević of the Progressive Party was confirmed for a second term in office after the election, by a vote of fifty-two to twenty-two (with four invalid votes). The government was supported by the Progressives, the Socialists, and the League of Social Democrats.

Milorad Mirčić, who served as the city's mayor in the 1990s, was re-elected to the assembly from the second position on the Radical Party list. Future parliamentarian Mirka Lukić Šarkanović was elected from the third position on the Socialist Party's list. Parliamentarian Nada Lazić received the fifteenth position on the League of Social Democrats of Vojvodina list and was not elected.

===== Bač =====
Results of the election for the Municipal Assembly of Bač:

Party	Votes	%	Seats
Aleksandar Vučić–Serbia Is Winning (Serbian Progressive Party, Party of United Pensioners of Serbia)	2,866	38.00	11
League of Social Democrats of Vojvodina–Nenad Čanak	1,132	15.01	4
Tomislav Bogunović–Sa Reči Na Dela–Democratic Party (LDP, DSHV)	1,048	13.89	4
Dr. Vojislav Šešelj–Serbian Radical Party	569	7.54	2
Ivica Dačić–"Socialist Party of Serbia (SPS), United Serbia (JS)–Dragan Marković Palma"	528	7.00	2
Movement of Socialists–Aleksandar Vulin	516	6.84	1
Mirko Pušara and Citizens of Bač Against Thieves	387	5.13	–
Alliance of Vojvodina Hungarians–István Pásztor	264	3.50	1
DSS, Dveri–Patriotic Blok For a Better Municipality of Bač	233	3.09	–
Total	7,543	100.00	25
Valid votes	7,543	96.47	
Invalid/blank votes	276	3.53	
Total votes	7,819	100.00	
Registered voters/turnout	13,226	59.12	

Incumbent mayor Dragan Stašević of the Progressive Party was confirmed for another term in office after the election. He was replaced by Borislav Antonić of the same party on 10 October 2017.

===== Bačka Palanka =====
Results of the election for the Municipal Assembly of Bačka Palanka:

Party	Votes	%	Seats
Aleksandar Vučić–Serbia Is Winning (Serbian Progressive Party, Serbian Renewal Movement, Social Democratic Party of Serbia, Serbian People's Party, Slovaks Forward)	11,273	38.30	20
Movement of Socialists–Peđa Vuletić, Saša Borković, Dr. Boro Jović (PS–PUPS)	5,181	17.60	9
Ivica Dačić–Socialist Party of Serbia (SPS), United Serbia (JS) Dragan Marković Palma, Communist Party (KP)	3,915	13.30	7
Dr. Vojislav Šešelj–Serbian Radical Party	2,794	9.49	4
Democratic Party–For a Just Bačka Palanka	1,241	4.22	–
Enough Is Enough–Saša Radulović	1,230	4.18	–
Party of Vojvodina Slovaks–Viliam Slavka	847	2.88	–
People's Movement of Dinara-Drina-Danube–Miro Mijotović	754	2.56	–
Dveri–Democratic Party of Serbia. Because We Are Different!	708	2.41	–
Changes for a Decent Bačka Palanka–LSV, LDP, SDS, NS	696	2.36	–
Alliance of Vojvodina Hungarians–István Pásztor	520	1.77	–
Republican Party Baja Šumar Branislav Gluvajić	274	0.93	–
Total	29,433	100.00	40
Valid votes	29,433	97.44	
Invalid/blank votes	773	2.56	
Total votes	30,206	100.00	
Registered voters/turnout	48,002	62.93	

Branislav Šušnica of the Progressive Party was chosen as mayor after the election.

===== Bački Petrovac =====
Results of the election for the Municipal Assembly of Bački Petrovac:

Party	Votes	%	Seats
Aleksandar Vučić–Serbia Is Winning (Serbian Progressive Party, Social Democratic Party of Serbia)	1,767	25.63	9
United Serbia–Miroslav Čeman	1,276	18.51	6
Let's Save Our Villages Today–Democratic Party (Democratic Party, Democratic Alliance of Croats in Vojvodina)	974	14.13	5
League of Social Democrats of Vojvodina–Nenad Čanak	652	9.46	3
Ivica Dačić–Socialist Party of Serbia	474	6.88	2
Slovak Party Dr. Boldocki Ilić Ana	467	6.77	2
For an Environment Worth Living In	461	6.69	2
Slovaks Forward!	424	6.15	2
Together for the Municipality–Boris Tadić (Social Democratic Party, Liberal Democratic Party)	211	3.06	–
Dr. Vojislav Šešelj–Serbian Radical Party	187	2.71	–
Total	6,893	100.00	31
Valid votes	6,893	96.96	
Invalid/blank votes	216	3.04	
Total votes	7,109	100.00	
Registered voters/turnout	12,299	57.80	

Srđan Simić of the Progressive Party was chosen as mayor after the election.

===== Bečej =====
Results of the election for the Municipal Assembly of Bečej:

Party	Votes	%	Seats
Aleksandar Vučić–Serbia Is Winning (Serbian Progressive Party, Movement of Socialists, Party of United Pensioners of Serbia, Serbian Renewal Movement, Social Democratic Party of Serbia)	7,906	45.97	22
Alliance of Vojvodina Hungarians–Democratic Party of Vojvodina Hungarians–Party of Hungarian Unity–István Pásztor	2,844	16.54	7
Hungarian Movement–For Change!–Dr. Tamaš Korhec–VMDK	1,614	9.39	4
Enough Is Enough–Saša Radulović	1,255	7.30	3
League of Social Democrats of Vojvodina–Nenad Čanak	845	4.91	–
Democratic Party	838	4.87	–
Bečej First–Socialist Party of Serbia (SPS), Serbian Radical Party (SRS), Communist Party (KP)	680	3.95	–
"Civil List–Zdravko Petrović–LDP and Non-Party Candidates"	677	3.94	–
Serbian People's Party–Nenad Popović	538	3.13	–
Total	17,197	100.00	36
Valid votes	17,197	96.40	
Invalid/blank votes	643	3.60	
Total votes	17,840	100.00	
Registered voters/turnout	33,757	52.85	

Incumbent mayor Vuk Radojević of the Progressive Party was confirmed for another term in office after the election, with the support of twenty-eight of the thirty-three delegates who were present. He was replaced later in the year by Dragan Tošić of the same party.

===== Beočin =====
Results of the election for the Municipal Assembly of Beočin:

Party	Votes	%	Seats
Aleksandar Vučić–Serbia Is Winning (Serbian Progressive Party)	3,972	45.21	14
"Ivica Dačić–Socialist Party of Serbia (SPS)"	1,627	18.52	5
People's Movement of Dinara-Drina-Danube–RDS–Biljana Janković (People's Movement of Dinara-Drina-Danube, Roma Democratic Party)	652	7.42	2
For a Just Municipality of Beočin–Democratic Party–Dr. Boško Blagojević	604	6.87	2
Democratic Party of Serbia	528	6.01	1
League of Social Democrats of Vojvodina–Nenad Čanak	500	5.69	1
Dr. Vojislav Šešelj–Serbian Radical Party	347	3.95	–
The Future of Beočin–Tradesmen, Entrepreneurs, and Farmers of the Municipality of Beočin	283	3.22	–
Citizens' Group: Goran Kalabić Kalaba	273	3.11	–
Total	8,786	100.00	25
Valid votes	8,786	96.78	
Invalid/blank votes	292	3.22	
Total votes	9,078	100.00	
Registered voters/turnout	13,456	67.46	

Mitar Milinković of the Progressive Party was chosen as mayor after the election.

===== Srbobran =====
Results of the election for the Municipal Assembly of Srbobran:

Party	Votes	%	Seats
Aleksandar Vučić–Serbia Is Winning (Serbian Progressive Party, Movement of Socialists, Social Democratic Party of Serbia)	2,554	31.68	11
Citizens' Group: Branko Gajin	1,716	21.28	7
"Ivica Dačić–Socialist Party of Serbia (SPS)"	1,553	19.26	7
Citizens' Group: "Zoran Dudvarski"	569	7.06	2
Dr. Vojislav Šešelj–Serbian Radical Party	410	5.08	–
Alliance of Vojvodina Hungarians–István Pásztor	394	4.89	1
League of Social Democrats of Vojvodina–Nenad Čanak	342	4.24	–
Valerija Tanasijin–Democratic Party	320	3.97	–
Democratic Party of Serbia–Dveri–Srbobran Patriotic Blok	205	2.54	–
Total	8,063	100.00	28
Valid votes	8,063	96.66	
Invalid/blank votes	279	3.34	
Total votes	8,342	100.00	
Registered voters/turnout	14,004	59.57	

Neško Čestić of the Progressive Party was chosen as mayor after the election. He was replaced by his party colleague Radivoj Paroški on 6 July 2017.

===== Sremski Karlovci =====
Results of the election for the Municipal Assembly of Sremski Karlovci:

Party	Votes	%	Seats
Aleksandar Vučić–Serbia Is Winning (Serbian Progressive Party, Party of United Pensioners of Serbia)	2,025	44.69	13
Citizens' Group: Unanimously for Karlovci–Milenko Filipović	933	20.59	5
Movement of Socialists–Aleksandar Vulin	344	7.59	2
Dr. Vojislav Šešelj–Serbian Radical Party	331	7.31	2
Dveri–Democratic Party of Serbia–Patriotic Blok	313	6.91	2
"Ivica Dačić–Socialist Party of Serbia (SPS)"	287	6.33	1
Citizens' Group: Danube 1245	215	4.75	–
People's Movement of Dinara-Drina-Danube–Miro Mijotović	83	1.83	–
Total	4,531	100.00	25
Valid votes	4,531	96.45	
Invalid/blank votes	167	3.55	
Total votes	4,698	100.00	
Registered voters/turnout	8,449	55.60	

Nenad Milenković of the Progressive Party was chosen as mayor after the election.

===== Temerin =====
Results of the election for the Municipal Assembly of Temerin:

Party	Votes	%	Seats
Aleksandar Vučić–Serbia Is Winning (Serbian Progressive Party, Movement of Socialists, Serbian Renewal Movement)	5,595	38.70	17
Alliance of Vojvodina Hungarians–Democratic Fellowship of Vojvodina Hungarians–István Pásztor	1,940	13.42	5
Dr. Vojislav Šešelj–Serbian Radical Party	1,319	9.12	4
Ivica Dačić–Socialist Party of Serbia	1,167	8.07	3
Citizens' Group: Together for Our Temerin–Robert Karan	1,016	7.03	3
DSS–Dveri–Slobodan Tomić	656	4.54	–
People's Movement of Dinara-Drina-Danube	651	4.50	–
Democratic Blok (Democratic Party, Boris Tadić–SDS, LDP, Green Ecological Party–The Greens-Dejan Bulatović)	625	4.32	–
Citizens' Group: The Spark–Zoran Pekez	575	3.98	–
League of Social Democrats of Vojvodina–Nenad Čanak	534	3.69	–
Party of Russians of Serbia	378	2.61	1
Total	14,456	100.00	33
Valid votes	14,456	97.09	
Invalid/blank votes	433	2.91	
Total votes	14,889	100.00	
Registered voters/turnout	24,802	60.03	

Incumbent mayor Đuro Žiga of the Progressive Party was confirmed for another term in office after the election.

===== Titel =====
Results of the election for the Municipal Assembly of Titel:

Party	Votes	%	Seats
Aleksandar Vučić–Serbia Is Winning (Serbian Progressive Party)	4,811	52.93	18
Ivica Dačić–"Socialist Party of Serbia (SPS), Movement of Socialists (PS)–Vladimir Soro	1,539	16.93	5
Dr. Vojislav Šešelj–Serbian Radical Party	584	6.42	2
Democratic Party–Nastasić Milan	447	4.92	–
League of Social Democrats of Vojvodina–Nenad Čanak	433	4.76	–
People's Movement of Dinara-Drina-Danube	335	3.69	–
Citizens' Group: Dragica Radić	252	2.77	–
Enough Is Enough–Saša Radulović	240	2.64	–
Social Democratic Party Boris Tadić–Vladimir Savić	194	2.13	–
Serbian-Russian Movement	130	1.43	–
Dveri–Democratic Party of Serbia–Stanko Prodanović Prša	125	1.38	–
Total	9,090	100.00	25
Valid votes	9,090	97.20	
Invalid/blank votes	262	2.80	
Total votes	9,352	100.00	
Registered voters/turnout	13,053	71.65	

Dragan Božić of the Progressive Party was chosen as mayor after the election.

===== Vrbas =====
There was no election for the Municipal Assembly of Vrbas in 2016. The previous election had taken place in 2013, and the next election took place in 2017.

===== Žabalj =====
Results of the election for the Municipal Assembly of Žabalj:

Party	Votes	%	Seats
Aleksandar Vučić–Serbia Is Winning (Serbian Progressive Party, Movement of Socialists, Party of United Pensioners of Serbia)	4,464	35.15	13
"Čedomir Božić–Our Municipality of Žabalj"	3,083	24.28	9
League of Social Democrats of Vojvodina–Nenad Čanak	973	7.66	3
"Ivica Dačić–Socialist Party of Serbia (SPS)"	898	7.07	2
Citizens' Group: Civic Initiative	780	6.14	2
Dr. Vojislav Šešelj–Serbian Radical Party	763	6.01	2
Democratic Party of Serbia–Serbian Movement Dveri	624	4.91	–
Vasa Zlokolica–SPO, SNP, SDP Serbia	572	4.50	–
Democratic Party Milorad Stepanov-Giśa	353	2.78	–
People's Movement of Dinara-Drina-Danube–Tara Tepić	190	1.50	–
Total	12,700	100.00	31
Valid votes	12,700	96.40	
Invalid/blank votes	474	3.60	
Total votes	13,174	100.00	
Registered voters/turnout	22,222	59.28	

Incumbent mayor Čedomir Božić and his independent group joined the Progressives after the election, and Božić was confirmed for another term in office.

==== South Banat District ====
Local elections were held in the two cities (Pančevo and Vršac) and five of the six other municipalities of the South Banat District. The exception was Kovin, where the previous election had been held in 2013 and the next election was held in 2017. The Progressive Party and its allies won majority victories in all jurisdictions that held elections except Vršac and Bela Crkva, where they won plurality victories. In all jurisdictions that held elections, the Progressive Party emerged as the dominant party in the local government.

===== Pančevo =====
Results of the election for the City Assembly of Pančevo:

Party	Votes	%	Seats
Aleksandar Vučić–Serbia Is Winning (Serbian Progressive Party, Social Democratic Party of Serbia, Party of United Pensioners of Serbia, Serbian Renewal Movement)	27,630	47.40	39
Democratic Party–Dr. Dušan Stojić	4,880	8.37	7
Ivica Dačić–Socialist Party of Serbia (SPS), United Serbia (JS)–Dragan Marković Palma, Democratic Party of Macedonians	4,764	8.17	6
Dr. Vojislav Šešelj–Serbian Radical Party	4,699	8.06	6
League of Social Democrats of Vojvodina–Nenad Čanak	4,654	7.98	6
Enough Is Enough–Saša Radulović	4,177	7.17	5
Dveri–DSS–Change for the Better	2,788	4.78	–
Petar Andrejić–Non-Partisan Citizens' List	1,977	3.39	–
SDS–Srđan Miković	1,168	2.00	–
Alliance for a Better Pančevo–Liberal Democratic Party–New Party	836	1.43	–
Alliance of Vojvodina Hungarians–István Pásztor	719	1.23	1
Total	58,292	100.00	70
Valid votes	58,292	96.94	
Invalid/blank votes	1,842	3.06	
Total votes	60,134	100.00	
Registered voters/turnout	112,200	53.60	

Incumbent mayor Saša Pavlov of the Serbian Progressive Party was confirmed for another term in office after the election.

Marinika Tepić was elected from the lead position on the list of the League of Social Democrats of Vojvodina. She was also elected to the national assembly and resigned her seat in the local parliament on 4 July 2016.

===== Alibunar =====
Results of the election for the Municipal Assembly of Alibunar:

Party	Votes	%	Seats
Aleksandar Vučić–Serbia Is Winning (Serbian Progressive Party, Party of United Pensioners of Serbia)	4,516	43.11	12
Ivica Dačić–Socialist Party of Serbia	1,612	15.39	4
Democratic Party–Dr. Bojan Pajtić	1,468	14.01	3
League of Social Democrats of Vojvodina–Nenad Čanak	781	7.46	2
Serbian People's Party–Nenad Popović	648	6.19	1
Serbian Radical Party–Dr. Vojislav Šešelj	563	5.37	1
Social Democratic Party–Boris Tadić	539	5.15	–
Dveri–DSS–Nikola Glumac–The Choice Is Up to You	348	3.32	–
Total	10,475	100.00	23
Valid votes	10,475	96.88	
Invalid/blank votes	337	3.12	
Total votes	10,812	100.00	
Registered voters/turnout	18,859	57.33	

Incumbent mayor Predrag Belić of the Serbian Progressive Party was confirmed for another term in office after the election. He was replaced by Dušan Dakić of the same party in July 2018.

===== Bela Crkva =====
Results of the election for the Municipal Assembly of Bela Crkva:

Party	Votes	%	Seats
Serbian Progressive Party	4,191	42.89	17
League of Social Democrats of Vojvodina	1,996	20.43	8
Citizens' Group: Bela Crkva Communist Free Initiative	770	7.88	3
Democratic Party	710	7.27	3
United Serbia	682	6.98	3
Socialist Party of Serbia	426	4.36	–
Serbian Radical Party	390	3.99	–
DSS–Dveri	245	2.51	–
Movement of Socialists	198	2.03	–
Social Democratic Party–Boris Tadić	164	1.68	–
Total	9,772	100.00	34
Valid votes	9,772	96.39	
Invalid/blank votes	366	3.61	
Total votes	10,138	100.00	
Registered voters/turnout	16,457	61.60	

Incumbent mayor Darko Bogosavljević of the Serbian Progressive Party was chosen for another term in office after the election.

===== Kovačica =====
Results of the election for the Municipal Assembly of Kovačica:

Party	Votes	%	Seats
Aleksandar Vučić–Serbia Is Winning (Serbian Progressive Party)	5,440	46.55	21
Democratic Party	2,347	20.08	9
League of Social Democrats of Vojvodina–Nenad Čanak	1,805	15.44	6
Ivica Dačić–"Socialist Party of Serbia (SPS)"	703	6.02	2
Citizens' Group: Ordinary People–Sava Kolarski	555	4.75	–
Citizens' Group: Green Apple	448	3.83	–
Alliance of Vojvodina Hungarians–István Pásztor	389	3.33	1
Total	11,687	100.00	39
Valid votes	11,687	97.52	
Invalid/blank votes	297	2.48	
Total votes	11,984	100.00	
Registered voters/turnout	22,310	53.72	

Milan Garašević of the Serbian Progressive Party was chosen as mayor after the election.

===== Kovin =====
There was no municipal election in Kovin in 2016. The previous election had taken place in 2013, and the next election took place in 2017.

===== Opovo =====
Results of the election for the Municipal Assembly of Opovo:

Party	Votes	%	Seats
Aleksandar Vučić–Serbia Is Winning (Serbian Progressive Party, Party of United Pensioners of Serbia)	2,499	46.22	14
Citizens' Group: "Milorad Soldatović"	1,405	25.98	8
Ivica Dačić–Socialist Party of Serbia (SPS)	400	7.40	2
List Against Corruption: Đurica Savkov, Dragan Stanivuk	327	6.05	1
League of Social Democrats of Vojvodina–Nenad Čanak	248	4.59	–
Justice–Opovo	206	3.81	–
Dr. Vojislav Šešelj–Serbian Radical Party	195	3.61	–
United Russian Party–Žanna Knežević	127	2.35	–
Total	5,407	100.00	25
Valid votes	5,407	96.61	
Invalid/blank votes	190	3.39	
Total votes	5,597	100.00	
Registered voters/turnout	8,550	65.46	

Zoran Tasić of the Serbian Progressive Party was chosen as mayor after the election.

===== Plandište =====
Results of the election for the Municipal Assembly of Plandište:

Party	Votes	%	Seats
Aleksandar Vučić–Serbia Is Winning (Serbian Progressive Party, Party of United Pensioners of Serbia)	2,404	41.74	12
Citizens' Group: We Can–Zoran Vorkapić	1,483	25.75	7
"Ivica Dačić–Socialist Party of Serbia (SPS)"	482	8.37	2
Nenad Čanak–League of Social Democrats of Vojvodina–The Land Is Not for Sale–LDP, SDS, SDPS	378	6.56	2
Democratic Party Dragan Stefanovski–For Plandište With Vision	263	4.57	–
Citizens' Group: "Green Apple" Plandište Nikola Kovačević	202	3.51	–
Citizens' Group: For Our Municipality of Plandište–Lawyer Lukić Danilo	195	3.39	–
Serbian Radical Party Dr. Vojislav Šešelj	181	3.14	–
Party of Macedonians of Serbia	171	2.97	–
Total	5,759	100.00	23
Valid votes	5,759	96.16	
Invalid/blank votes	230	3.84	
Total votes	5,989	100.00	
Registered voters/turnout	9,458	63.32	

Jovan Repac of the Serbian Progressive Party was chosen as mayor after the election.

===== Vršac =====
Results of the election for the City Assembly of Vršac:

Party	Votes	%	Seats
Aleksandar Vučić–Serbia Is Winning (Serbian Progressive Party, Social Democratic Party of Serbia)	9,954	38.23	20
Citizens' Group: Movement of the Vršac Region–European Region–Jovica Zarkula	3,842	14.76	7
"Ivica Dačić–Socialist Party of Serbia (SPS), United Serbia (JS)"	3,765	14.46	7
Citizens' Group: For a Better Vršac	3,014	11.58	6
Democratic Party–Dr. Tatjana Vešović	1,712	6.58	3
Enough Is Enough–Saša Radulović	1,357	5.21	2
Dr. Vojislav Šešelj–Serbian Radical Party	1,020	3.92	–
League of Social Democrats of Vojvodina–Nenad Čanak	1,008	3.87	–
"Russian Party–Zvezdana Vuletić"	365	1.40	–
Total	26,037	100.00	45
Valid votes	26,037	96.78	
Invalid/blank votes	867	3.22	
Total votes	26,904	100.00	
Registered voters/turnout	46,691	57.62	

Dragana Mitrović of the Serbian Progressive Party was chosen as mayor after the election.

==== Srem District ====
Local elections were held in the one city (Sremska Mitrovica) and five of the other six municipalities in the Srem District. The exception was Pećinci, where the most recent local election had taken place in 2014. In all jurisdictions that held elections, the Serbian Progressive Party and its allies won the elections and formed government.

===== Sremska Mitrovica =====
Results of the election for the City Assembly of Sremska Mitrovica:

Party	Votes	%	Seats
Aleksandar Vučić–Serbia Is Winning (Serbian Progressive Party, Social Democratic Party of Serbia, Party of United Pensioners of Serbia, Movement of Socialists)	21,345	50.93	35
"Ivica Dačić–Socialist Party of Serbia (SPS)–Dr. Milan Latković"	4,165	9.94	6
For a Just Serbia Democratic Party–Dr. Miroslav Kendrišić (DS, DSHV, NOVA)	3,899	9.30	6
Dr. Vojislav Šešelj–Serbian Radical Party	2,763	6.59	4
League of Social Democrats of Vojvodina–Nenad Čanak, Liberal Democratic Party–Čedomir Jovanović, Green Ecological Party–The Greens	2,482	5.92	4
Coalition: Democratic Party of Serbia–People's Movement Dinara Drina Danube	2,270	5.42	3
United Opposition of Mitrovica–Aleksandar Prodanović (SDS–Boris Tadić, Together for Serbia, Vojvodina's Party)	2,264	5.40	3
Dveri for Sremska Mitrovica–Mr. Milan Maslać	2,010	4.80	–
Citizens' Group: Serbian Left–Borko Stefanović	716	1.71	–
Total	41,914	100.00	61
Valid votes	41,914	96.76	
Invalid/blank votes	1,403	3.24	
Total votes	43,317	100.00	
Registered voters/turnout	70,562	61.39	

Vladimir Petković of the Serbian Progressive Party was chosen as mayor after the election. He resigned in September 2016 and was replaced by Vladimir Sanader of the same party.

===== Inđija =====
Results of the election for the Municipal Assembly of Inđija:

Party	Votes	%	Seats
Aleksandar Vučić–Serbia Is Winning (Serbian Progressive Party, People's Peasant Party)	12,334	48.78	21
Petar Filipović–Because I Love Inđija (Democratic Party, New Party)	6,601	26.11	11
"Ivica Dačić–Socialist Party of Serbia (SPS)"	1,915	7.57	3
Dr. Vojislav Šešelj–Serbian Radical Party	1,439	5.69	2
"League of Social Democrats of Vojvodina–Inđija Is Our Home–Nenad Čanak–Movement for Reversal-Green Ecological Party - The Greens"	1,205	4.77	–
Dveri–DSS–Mr. Radovan Krstić	970	3.84	–
Citizens' Group: "IN–Our Inđija Dr. Čedomir Dragović"	565	2.23	–
People's Movement Dinara Drina Danube–Milivoje Ravnjak	257	1.02	–
Total	25,286	100.00	37
Valid votes	25,286	97.30	
Invalid/blank votes	701	2.70	
Total votes	25,987	100.00	
Registered voters/turnout	41,994	61.88	

Vladimir Gak of the Serbian Progressive Party was chosen as mayor after the election.

===== Irig =====
Results of the election for the Municipal Assembly of Irig:

Party	Votes	%	Seats
Aleksandar Vučić–Serbia Is Winning (Serbian Progressive Party, Party of United Pensioners of Serbia)	2,123	37.82	10
The Best Choice–Veterinary Doctor Živan Radojčić (Democratic Party, Alliance of Vojvodina Hungarians, Liberal Democratic Party)	699	12.45	3
League of Social Democrats of Vojvodina–Nenad Čanak	487	8.68	2
Citizens' Group: Citizens' List–Zoran Knežević	394	7.02	1
Ivica Dačić–"Socialist Party of Serbia (SPS)"	385	6.86	1
The Way of the Left Movement of Socialists–Aleksandar Vulin	331	5.90	1
Green Party–Đorđe Kalenatić	315	5.61	1
Dr. Vojislav Šešelj–Serbian Radical Party	308	5.49	1
Citizens' Group: Srđan Budimčić Kepa–For Our Municipality of Irig	269	4.79	–
Enough Is Enough–Saša Radulović	218	3.88	–
We Will Do it Together–Dveri–DSS–Bojan Ristić	84	1.50	–
Total	5,613	100.00	20
Valid votes	5,613	96.05	
Invalid/blank votes	231	3.95	
Total votes	5,844	100.00	
Registered voters/turnout	9,524	61.36	

Incumbent mayor Stevan Kazimirović of the Serbian Progressive Party was confirmed for another term in office after the election. The local government consisted of the Progressive Party's alliance, the League of Social Democrats of Vojvodina, Zoran Knežević's group, and the Movement of Socialists.

===== Pećinci =====
There was no election for the Municipal Assembly of Pećinci in 2016. The previous election had taken place in 2014, and the next election took place in 2017.

===== Ruma =====
Results of the election for the Municipal Assembly of Ruma:

Party	Votes	%	Seats
Aleksandar Vučić–Serbia Is Winning (Serbian Progressive Party)	13,906	52.67	26
Ivica Dačić–"Socialist Party of Serbia (SPS), United Serbia (JS)–Dragan Marković Palma"	2,594	9.82	5
Ruma Can Do Better–Nenad Borović (League of Social Democrats of Vojvodina, Democratic Party, Green Ecological Party - The Greens)	2,550	9.66	4
Serbian Radical Party Dr. Vojislav Šešelj	2,102	7.96	4
Enough Is Enough–Saša Radulović	1,539	5.83	2
Dveri–DSS–Jovan Stanojčić	1,090	4.13	–
Boris Tadić, Čedomir Jovanović–Alliance for Ruma (Social Democratic Party, Liberal Democratic Party)	953	3.61	–
United Russian Party–Goran Stjepanović	563	2.13	1
Green Party–Zorica Jozić	556	2.11	1
Citizen's Group: "Serbian Left–Borko Stefanović"	550	2.08	–
Total	26,403	100.00	43
Valid votes	26,403	97.42	
Invalid/blank votes	700	2.58	
Total votes	27,103	100.00	
Registered voters/turnout	47,293	57.31	

Incumbent mayor Slađan Mančić of the Serbian Progressive Party was confirmed for another term in office after the election.

Aleksandar Martinović was elected from the lead position on the Progressive Party's list and led the party's assembly group in the term that followed.

===== Šid =====
Results of the election for the Municipal Assembly of Šid:

Party	Votes	%	Seats
Aleksandar Vučić–Serbia Is Winning (Serbian Progressive Party, Party of United Pensioners of Serbia, Social Democratic Party of Serbia, Movement of Socialists, Serbian Renewal Movement, Slovaks Forward)	8,470	50.77	23
"It's Time for Decent People" (Democratic Party, League of Social Democrats of Vojvodina, Social Democratic Party, Green Ecological Party - The Greens, Liberal Democratic Party)	2,350	14.09	6
Dr. Vojislav Šešelj–Serbian Radical Party	2,114	12.67	5
Ivica Dačić–"Socialist Party of Serbia (SPS), United Serbia (JS)–Dragan Marković Palma"	1,799	10.78	5
People's Movement Dinara Drina Danube–Tomislav Bokan	713	4.27	–
Serbian Movement Dveri–Democratic Party of Serbia–Sanda Rašković Ivić–Boško Obradović	669	4.01	–
Serbian People's Party–Nenad Popović	567	3.40	–
Total	16,682	100.00	39
Valid votes	16,682	96.14	
Invalid/blank votes	670	3.86	
Total votes	17,352	100.00	
Registered voters/turnout	30,876	56.20	

Predrag Vuković of the Serbian Progressive Party was chosen as mayor after the election.

===== Stara Pazova =====
Results of the election for the Municipal Assembly of Stara Pazova:

Party	Votes	%	Seats
Aleksandar Vučić–Serbia Is Winning (Serbian Progressive Party, Social Democratic Party of Serbia, Party of United Pensioners of Serbia, Movement of Socialists, New Serbia, Slovaks Forward, Serbian People's Party)	16,085	51.73	29
Dr. Vojislav Šešelj–Serbian Radical Party	2,450	7.88	4
Citizens' Group: Choice for Our Municipality	2,245	7.22	4
Ivica Dačić–Socialist Party of Serbia	2,161	6.95	3
Democratic Party	1,919	6.17	3
Goran Jović–With the Pazova Movement to Victory–Social Democratic Party–Liberal Democratic Party–League of Social Democrats of Vojvodina	1,661	5.34	3
Dragan Marković Palma–United Serbia	1,486	4.78	–
Green Party (Green Party, Slovak Party)	1,339	4.31	2
Dveri–DSS	1,018	3.27	–
Let's Wake Up Pazova–Miloš Crnomarković–People's Movement Dinara Drina Danube–Russian Party	728	2.34	–
Total	31,092	100.00	48
Valid votes	31,092	96.82	
Invalid/blank votes	1,021	3.18	
Total votes	32,113	100.00	
Registered voters/turnout	55,858	57.49	

Incumbent mayor Đorđe Radinović of the Serbian Progressive Party was confirmed for another term in office after the election.

==== West Bačka District ====
Local elections were held in the one city (Sombor) and two of the other three municipalities in the West Bačka District. The exception was Odžaci, where the most recent local election had taken place in 2013. The Serbian Progressive Party and its allies won the elections and formed government in all jurisdictions that held elections.

===== Sombor =====
Results of the election for the City Assembly of Sombor:

Party	Votes	%	Seats
Aleksandar Vučić–Serbia Is Winning (Serbian Progressive Party, Social Democratic Party of Serbia, Party of United Pensioners of Serbia, Movement of Socialists, Third Serbia, Alliance of Bačka Bunjevci)	17,617	42.40	30
"Ivica Dačić–Socialist Party of Serbia (SPS), United Serbia (JS)"	3,425	8.24	6
Dr. Vojislav Šešelj–Serbian Radical Party	2,910	7.00	5
Multiple Democratic–Democratic Party (NOVA, SDS, LDP, VP, DSHV)	2,733	6.58	4
Sombor in the Heart–SPO	2,511	6.04	4
Citizens' Group: Dušan Jović–Sombor for Everyone	2,333	5.62	4
"Enough Is Enough–Saša Radulović"	2,170	5.22	3
Alliance of Vojvodina Hungarians–István Pásztor	1,851	4.45	3
League of Social Democrats of Vojvodina–Nenad Čanak	1,599	3.85	–
"Dveri, DSS, Better Sombor–Patriotic Blok"	1,340	3.23	–
Citizens' Group: Our Villages, Our City–Nebojša Berić	881	2.12	–
VMDK–Hungarian Movement–For Change!	629	1.51	1
Serbian-Russian Movement–Dr. Dunja Prokić	603	1.45	1
Republican Party–Zoran Miler	497	1.20	–
Truth–Zlata Đerić–New Serbia	450	1.08	–
Total	41,549	100.00	61
Valid votes	41,549	97.66	
Invalid/blank votes	997	2.34	
Total votes	42,546	100.00	
Registered voters/turnout	76,742	55.44	

Dušanka Golubović of the Serbian Progressive Party was chosen as mayor after the election. Parliamentarian Žika Gojković was elected to the assembly from the first position on the SPO list; he resigned his seat on 22 June 2016.

Future parliamentarian Emese Úri appeared in the sixth position on the list of the Alliance of Vojvodina Hungarians.

Parliamentarian Zlata Đerić led the New Serbia list.

===== Apatin =====
Results of the election for the Municipal Assembly of Apatin:

Party	Votes	%	Seats
Aleksandar Vučić–Serbia Is Winning (Serbian Progressive Party, Party of United Pensioners of Serbia, Social Democratic Party of Serbia)	5,640	36.99	12
Dr. Živorad Smiljanić–Socialist Party of Serbia, United Serbia, and People's Movement Dinara-Drina-Danube	5,276	34.60	12
"Dr. Vojislav Šešelj–Serbian Radical Party"	979	6.42	2
Dr. Bruno Urbanovski–For a Just Municipality of Apatin–Democratic Party (Democratic Party, Democratic Alliance of Croats in Vojvodina)	943	6.18	2
Alliance of Vojvodina Hungarians–István Pásztor	641	4.20	1
SDS–Boris Tadić, SPO, LDP	494	3.24	–
Enough Is Enough–Saša Radulović	391	2.56	–
Milan Dražić–You Know Why (Movement of Socialists)	366	2.40	–
Green Party	198	1.30	–
Republican Party–Zlatko Klecin	187	1.23	–
For Our Apatin (Democratic Party of Serbia, Dveri, Serbian People's Party)	133	0.87	–
Total	15,248	100.00	29
Valid votes	15,248	96.89	
Invalid/blank votes	490	3.11	
Total votes	15,738	100.00	
Registered voters/turnout	26,377	59.67	

Radivoj Sekulić of the Progressive Party was chosen as mayor after the election. He was replaced by Milan Škrbić of the same party in January 2017.

===== Kula =====
Results of the election for the Municipal Assembly of Kula:

Party	Votes	%	Seats
Aleksandar Vučić–Serbia Is Winning (Serbian Progressive Party)	8,595	41.57	19
"Prof. Dr. Velibor Vasović–Socialist Party of Serbia (SPS)"	2,144	10.37	4
Certainly Better–Democratic Party Dr. Jovan Janić	2,034	9.84	4
United Serbia–Dragan Marković Palma	1,885	9.12	4
Dr. Vojislav Šešelj–Serbian Radical Party	1,096	5.30	2
Hercen Keka Radonjić–Russian Party	996	4.82	2
Alliance of Vojvodina Hungarians–István Pásztor	942	4.56	2
League of Social Democrats of Vojvodina–Nenad Čanak–Green Ecological Party-The Greens–Dejan Bulatović	724	3.50	–
Dveri–People's Movement Dinara-Drina-Danube	679	3.28	–
Serbian People's Party "From the People - To the People"	605	2.93	–
Citizens' Group: Entrepreneur	511	2.47	–
Boris Tadić, Čedomir Jovanović–Alliance for a Better Municipality–SDS–Boris Tadić, LDP	463	2.24	–
Total	20,674	100.00	37
Valid votes	20,674	96.78	
Invalid/blank votes	687	3.22	
Total votes	21,361	100.00	
Registered voters/turnout	36,691	58.22	

Perica Videkanjić of the Progressive Party was chosen as mayor after the election. He stood down in May 2018 and was replaced by Velibor Milojičić, who in turn resigned in September of the same year, prompting new local elections. After resigning, Milojočić served as leader of a provisional administration.

===== Odžaci =====
There was no election for the Municipal Assembly of Odžaci in 2016. The previous election had taken place in 2013, and the next election took place in 2017.

=== Šumadija and Western Serbia ===
==== Mačva District ====
Local elections were held in both cities (i.e., Šabac and Loznica) and all six municipalities of the Mačva District. In Šabac, the Serbian Progressive Party won a narrow victory over an alliance led by incumbent mayor Nebojša Zelenović of Together for Serbia, but Zelenović was subsequently able to form a coalition government with support from other parties, giving the opposition parties a rare victory.

The Progressives and their allies won majority victories in Loznica, Koceljeva, Krupanj, and Vladimirci. In Mali Zvornik, they formed a coalition government after falling one seat short of a majority.

The Socialist Party of Serbia narrowly won the election in Bogatić and afterward formed a coalition government that included the Progressives. In Ljubovija, the Socialists won a plurality victory, but the Progressives formed government in an alliance with an independent list, and the Socialists served in opposition. While the parties were aligned at the republic level during this time, the Progressives and Socialists were the principle rivals for power in some municipalities of the Mačva District.

===== Šabac =====
Results of the election for the City Assembly of Šabac:

Party	Votes	%	Seats
Aleksandar Vučić–Serbia Is Winning (Serbian Progressive Party)	22,180	35.47	28
Nebojša Zelenović–Šabac Is Ours (Together for Serbia, Democratic Party, Serbian Renewal Movement)	20,776	33.22	26
Citizens' Group: Victory for Šabac–Nemanja Pajić	8,693	13.90	11
Ivica Dačić–Socialist Party of Serbia (SPS), United Serbia (JS), Communist Party (KP)	3,250	5.20	4
Dr. Vojislav Šešelj–Serbian Radical Party	2,297	3.67	–
Veselin Vuković–For a Better Serbia–SDS-LDP-NPS	1,582	2.53	–
Serbian Movement Dveri–Democratic Party of Serbia–Patriotic Bloc–Dr. Aleksandar Pavlović–Dip. Ing. Predrag Vukosavović	1,372	2.19	–
Zoran Bortić–Šabac Socialists	962	1.54	–
Russian Party–Slobodan Nikolić	538	0.86	–
Tanja Radovanović–Progressive Movement–Better Today	479	0.77	–
Citizens' Group: We Love Šabac	406	0.65	–
Total	62,535	100.00	69
Valid votes	62,535	97.09	
Invalid/blank votes	1,877	2.91	
Total votes	64,412	100.00	
Registered voters/turnout	104,179	61.83	

Incumbent mayor Nebojša Zelenović's Šabac Is Ours coalition formed an alliance with the Victory for Šabac movement after the election, and Zelenović was re-elected as mayor. Two delegates from United Serbia also supported the administration.

===== Bogatić =====
Results of the election for the Municipal Assembly of Bogatić:

Party	Votes	%	Seats
Ivica Dačić–Socialist Party of Serbia (SPS)	4,203	25.84	9
Aleksandar Vučić–Serbia Is Winning (Serbian Progressive Party, Party of United Pensioners of Serbia, Movement of Socialists, Social Democratic Party of Serbia, Serbian People's Party)	4,076	25.06	9
"New Serbia"	1,952	12.00	4
United Serbia–Dragan Marković Palma–Dušan Tufegdžić	1,787	10.99	3
Citizens' Group: Positive Mačva–Milan Damnjanović	1,354	8.33	2
"Dr. Vojislav Šešelj–Serbian Radical Party"	1,181	7.26	2
For a Just Mačva–Slobodan Savić (Democratic Party, Together for Serbia, Social Democratic Party, Liberal Democratic Party)	1,180	7.26	2
Citizens' Group: Pobeda	531	3.26	–
Total	16,264	100.00	31
Valid votes	16,264	96.91	
Invalid/blank votes	519	3.09	
Total votes	16,783	100.00	
Registered voters/turnout	25,134	66.77	

Incumbent mayor Nenad Beserovac of the Socialist Party of Serbia was confirmed for a new term in office after the election.

===== Koceljeva =====
Results of the election for the Municipal Assembly of Koceljeva:

Party	Votes	%	Seats
Aleksandar Vučić–Serbia Is Winning (Serbian Progressive Party, New Serbia, Party of United Pensioners of Serbia)	6,581	82.23	27
Ivica Dačić–Socialist Party of Serbia (SPS), United Serbia (JS), Serbian Renewal Movement (SPO)–Dr. Čedomir Janković	1,055	13.18	4
Serbian Movement Dveri	367	4.59	–
Total	8,003	100.00	31
Valid votes	8,003	97.03	
Invalid/blank votes	245	2.97	
Total votes	8,248	100.00	
Registered voters/turnout	11,663	70.72	

Incumbent mayor Dušan Ilinčić of the Serbian Progressive Party was chosen for a new term in office after the election.

===== Krupanj =====
Results of the election for the Municipal Assembly of Krupanj:

Party	Votes	%	Seats
Aleksandar Vučić–Serbia Is Winning (Serbian Progressive Party, Social Democratic Party of Serbia, Party of United Pensioners of Serbia)	4,576	52.35	22
Ivica Dačić–Socialist Party of Serbia (SPS)	1,904	21.78	9
Movement of Socialists–Aleksandar Vulin	571	6.53	2
Democratic Party, SPO–Nenad Vasiljević	560	6.41	2
Dveri–Democratic Party of Serbia	391	4.47	–
Dr. Vojislav Šešelj–Serbian Radical Party	383	4.38	–
SNP–Krupanj Is Winning–Dr. Zorka Zora Jovanović	357	4.08	–
Total	8,742	100.00	35
Valid votes	8,742	96.29	
Invalid/blank votes	337	3.71	
Total votes	9,079	100.00	
Registered voters/turnout	14,298	63.50	

Ivan Isailović of the Serbian Progressive Party was chosen as mayor after the election.

===== Ljubovija =====
Results of the election for the Municipal Assembly of Ljubovija:

Party	Votes	%	Seats
"Ivica Dačić–Socialist Party of Serbia (SPS)"	2,824	32.72	13
Aleksandar Vučić–Serbia Is Winning (Serbian Progressive Party, Social Democratic Party of Serbia, Serbian Renewal Movement)	2,522	29.22	11
Citizens' Groups (two different lists)	1,449	16.79	5
Together for Ljubovija–Together for Serbia–Goran Josipović Gigo	864	10.01	4
Dr. Vojislav Šešelj–Serbian Radical Party	505	5.85	2
Democratic Party	173	2.00	–
Russian Party	144	1.67	–
Dveri–Democratic Party of Serbia	125	1.45	–
New Serbia–Serbian People's Party	24	0.28	–
Total	8,630	100.00	35
Valid votes	8,630	96.65	
Invalid/blank votes	299	3.35	
Total votes	8,929	100.00	
Registered voters/turnout	12,357	72.26	

Milovan Kovačević, a former Socialist who was elected on the For a Just Ljubovija list, was chosen as mayor after the election. Despite winning the election, the Socialists served in opposition when the assembly convened, along with the Radicals.

Sreto Perić, who appears to have led the Radical Party's list, served in the municipal assembly for the term that followed.

===== Loznica =====
Results of the election for the City Assembly of Loznica:

Party	Votes	%	Seats
Aleksandar Vučić–Serbia Is Winning (Serbian Progressive Party, Social Democratic Party of Serbia, Party of United Pensioners of Serbia, Movement of Socialists, Serbian Renewal Movement)	17,472	46.35	34
"Socialist Party of Serbia–Ivica Dačić"	3,663	9.72	7
Citizens' Group: Dr. Zoran Nikolić	3,130	8.30	6
Serbian People's Party–Nenad Popović	2,477	6.57	4
Democratic for Loznica–Dr. Nikola Jakovljević, Dr. Zoran Jović (Democratic Party, Liberal Democratic Party, Social Democratic Party)	2,418	6.41	4
Citizens' Group: Entrepreneurs and Businessmen–Boldly–Vidoje Purić	2,310	6.13	4
Dr. Vojislav Šešelj–Serbian Radical Party	1,945	5.16	–
Citizens' Group: Jovan Malović–Who Dares, Who Can Do it For Loznica	1,580	4.19	–
United Serbia–Dragan Marković Palma	970	2.57	–
Dveri–DSS–Patriotic Blok	875	2.32	–
Citizens' Group: Enough is Enough–Saša Radulović	857	2.27	–
Total	37,697	100.00	59
Valid votes	37,697	95.77	
Invalid/blank votes	1,665	4.23	
Total votes	39,362	100.00	
Registered voters/turnout	74,436	52.88	

Incumbent mayor Vidoje Petrović of the Serbian Progressive Party was chosen for a new term in office after the election.

===== Mali Zvornik =====
Results of the election for the Municipal Assembly of Mali Zvornik:

Party	Votes	%	Seats
Aleksandar Vučić–Serbia Is Winning (Serbian Progressive Party, Social Democratic Party of Serbia)	2,910	37.53	14
Socialist Party of Serbia (SPS)–Ivica Dačić	1,460	18.83	7
Citizens' Group: "Dr. Milan Lukić"–The Strength of the People	557	7.18	2
Democratic Party of Serbia	543	7.00	2
Citizens' Group: "For a Better Mali Zvornik–Kostjerčević Dragan"	530	6.84	2
Citizens' Group: "Mali Zvornik–Our Story"	441	5.69	2
Citizens' Group: "For Mali Zvornik–Žićo Jokić"	383	4.94	–
Democratic Party-Mali Zvornik	366	4.72	–
Dr. Vojislav Šešelj–Serbian Radical Party	321	4.14	–
Serbian People's Party–Nenad Popović	242	3.12	–
Total	7,753	100.00	29
Valid votes	7,753	96.47	
Invalid/blank votes	284	3.53	
Total votes	8,037	100.00	
Registered voters/turnout	13,202	60.88	

Incumbent mayor Zoran Jevtić of the Serbian Progressive Party was confirmed for another term in office after the election.

===== Vladimirci =====
Results of the election for the Municipal Assembly of Vladimirci:

Party	Votes	%	Seats
Aleksandar Vučić–Serbia Is Winning (Serbian Progressive Party, Social Democratic Party of Serbia)	4,120	44.49	14
For Vladimirci–Democratic Party–ZZS Vladica Marković	1,419	15.32	4
Ivica Dačić–Socialist Party of Serbia (SPS)	1,071	11.57	3
Nebojša Petronić–United Serbia–Marjan Šević	861	9.30	3
Citizens' Group: Let's Finish What We Started–Janko Đurić	559	6.04	1
Dr. Vojislav Šešelj–Serbian Radical Party	352	3.80	–
Democratic Party of Serbia–Dveri for Vladimirci–Milenko Arsić	338	3.65	–
Citizens' Group: Provo, Zvezd, Dragojevac, Alone Against All, Švabić Živko	310	3.35	–
Russian Party–Zoran Lazarević	230	2.48	–
Total	9,260	100.00	25
Valid votes	9,260	96.47	
Invalid/blank votes	339	3.53	
Total votes	9,599	100.00	
Registered voters/turnout	15,276	62.84	

Incumbent mayor Milorad Milinković of the Serbian Progressive Party was confirmed for a new term in office after the election. In August 2016, a new coalition was reported to have come to power without the Progressives, with Dragan Simeunović of the Socialist Party of Serbia in the role of mayor. The Progressives refused to cede power, leading to a situation in which both sides claimed to be the legitimate government of the municipality. Ultimately, the Progressives remained in power, and Milinković continued to serve as mayor.

==== Moravica District ====
Local elections were held in the one city (Čačak) and two of the three other municipalities in the Moravica District. The Progressive Party and its allies were successful in all three of the jurisdictions that held elections.

===== Čačak =====
Results of the election for the City Assembly of Čačak:

Party	Votes	%	Seats
Aleksandar Vučić–Serbia Is Winning (Serbian Progressive Party, Social Democratic Party of Serbia, Party of United Pensioners of Serbia, Movement of Socialists)	21,911	40.20	35
Dveri–For the Salvation of Čačak–Boško Obradović	13,460	24.70	21
New Serbia–Velimir Ilić	4,467	8.20	7
Citizens' Group: For a More Progressive Čačak–Dr. Aleksandar Radojević	3,906	7.17	6
"Ivica Dačić–Socialist Party of Serbia (SPS)–United Serbia (JS)–Democratic Party of Serbia (DSS)"	3,739	6.86	5
Dr. Vojislav Šešelj–Serbian Radical Party	1,946	3.57	–
Democratic Party	1,867	3.43	–
Party of Russians of Serbia–RUS–Youth for Čačak	1,062	1.95	1
Boris Tadić, Čedomir Jovanović–Alliance for a Better Čačak–Liberal Democratic Party, Social Democratic Party	953	1.75	–
Russian Party–Like Putin	424	0.78	–
Serbian People's Party–Nenad Popović	419	0.77	–
None of the Above	346	0.63	–
Total	54,500	100.00	75
Valid votes	54,500	96.81	
Invalid/blank votes	1,795	3.19	
Total votes	56,295	100.00	
Registered voters/turnout	99,371	56.65	

Milun Todorović of the Progressive Party was chosen as mayor following the election, with the support of forty-six delegates. Biljana Rubaković, who briefly served in the national assembly, was elected from the third position on Dveri's list.

===== Gornji Milanovac =====
Results of the election for the Municipal Assembly of Gornji Milanovac:

Party	Votes	%	Seats
Aleksandar Vučić–Serbia Is Winning (Serbian Progressive Party, New Serbia)	9,097	41.49	24
Ivica Dačić–Socialist Party of Serbia (SPS), United Serbia (JS)	7,884	35.96	21
Dveri	1,135	5.18	–
Green Party (Green Party, Slovak Party)	865	3.94	2
Democratic Party–LDP	864	3.94	–
Deeds, Not Words, Petar Govedarica, Master of Technological Sciences	860	3.92	–
Kristina Milošević–Party of Russians of Serbia	729	3.32	2
Dr. Slobodan Stanić–Social Democratic Party	493	2.25	–
Total	21,927	100.00	49
Valid votes	21,927	96.14	
Invalid/blank votes	881	3.86	
Total votes	22,808	100.00	
Registered voters/turnout	37,298	61.15	

Dejan Kovačević of the Progressive Party was chosen as mayor after the election.

===== Ivanjica =====
Results of the election for the Municipal Assembly of Ivanjica:

Party	Votes	%	Seats
Aleksandar Vučić–Serbia Is Winning (Serbian Progressive Party)	5,403	35.41	16
Citizens' Group: Milomir Zorić	3,146	20.62	9
New Serbia–Velimir Ilić–For a New Ivanjica	2,127	13.94	8
Ivica Dačić–Socialist Party of Serbia (SPS)	1,316	8.62	4
Boris Tadić, Čedomir Jovanović–Alliance for Ivanjica–SDS, LDP	906	5.94	2
Dveri–Democratic Party of Serbia–Sanda Rašković Ivić–Boško Obradović	695	4.55	–
Dr. Vojislav Šešelj–Serbian Radical Party	607	3.98	–
United Serbia–Dragan Marković Palma–For a United Ivanjica	448	2.94	–
Democratic Party	387	2.54	–
Russian Party–For Ivanjica–Vladimir Jekić	225	1.47	–
Total	15,260	100.00	39
Valid votes	15,260	96.23	
Invalid/blank votes	598	3.77	
Total votes	15,858	100.00	
Registered voters/turnout	26,770	59.24	

Zoran Lazović of the Progressive Party was chosen as mayor after the election.

Future parliamentarian Milovan Jakovljević of Dveri appeared in the second position on the combined Democratic Party of Serbia–Dveri list.

===== Lučani =====
There was no election for the Municipal Assembly of Lučani in 2016. The previous election had taken place in 2014, and the next election took place in 2018.

==== Pomoravlje District ====
Local elections were held in the one city (Jagodina) and all five other municipalities of the Pomoravlje District. United Serbia won a majority victory in its home base of Jagodina in an alliance with the Socialist Party of Serbia. The Progressive alliance won majority victories in Ćuprija and Despotovac, and it was ultimately able to form a stable coalition government in Rekovac as well.

The Democratic Party won and formed government in Paraćin, and an independent list won and formed government in Svilajnac.

===== Jagodina =====
Results of the election for the City Assembly of Jagodina:

Party	Votes	%	Seats
"Dragan Marković Palma–United Serbia–Ivica Dačić–Socialist Party of Serbia"	18,781	54.10	21
Aleksandar Vučić–Serbia Is Winning (Serbian Progressive Party, Social Democratic Party of Serbia, New Serbia)	9,154	26.37	10
Boris Tadić, Borko Stefanović–Alliance for a Better Jagodina–Social Democratic Party	1,639	4.72	–
Dr. Vojislav Šešelj–Serbian Radical Party	1,251	3.60	–
Dveri–Democratic Party of Serbia	1,219	3.51	–
Coalition: "Jagodina–My City, Democratic Party, LDP, SPO, ZZS"	1,134	3.27	–
Serbian-Russian Movement–Dušan Marković (Party of Russians of Serbia, Eastern Alternative, Serbian Patriotic Front, Serbian League, Hungarian League)	818	2.36	–
Russian Party	526	1.52	–
Roma List of Serbia (Democratic Union of Roma, United Roma Party, United Roma of Serbia)	195	0.56	–
Total	34,717	100.00	31
Valid votes	34,717	95.99	
Invalid/blank votes	1,451	4.01	
Total votes	36,168	100.00	
Registered voters/turnout	64,437	56.13	

Incumbent mayor Ratko Stevanović of United Serbia was elected from the fourth position on his party's list was confirmed afterward for another term in office.

United Serbia leader Dragan Marković Palma was re-elected from the lead position on his party's list and was appointed afterward for a new term as speaker of the city assembly. Petar Petrović was re-elected from the second position on the list and appointed for a new term as deputy speaker.

Života Starčević was re-elected to the assembly from the eighth position on the United Serbia list.

===== Ćuprija =====
Results of the election for the Municipal Assembly of Ćuprija:

Party	Votes	%	Seats
Aleksandar Vučić–Serbia Is Winning (Serbian Progressive Party, Party of United Pensioners of Serbia)	9,950	64.81	30
Citizens' Group: "Ravanica" Ćuprija	1,416	9.22	4
Dragan Marković Palma–United Serbia, Ivica Dačić–Socialist Party of Serbia	1,108	7.22	3
Dveri–Democratic Party of Serbia–Branislav Kostić	662	4.31	–
Boris Tadić, Čedomir Jovanović–Alliance for a Better Ćuprija–Liberal Democratic Party, Social Democratic Party	609	3.97	–
Democratic Party–Goran Petrović	574	3.74	–
Citizens' Group: Serbian Left–Borko Stefanović	523	3.41	–
Serbian People's Party–Prof. Vladan Cvetković	510	3.32	–
Total	15,352	100.00	37
Valid votes	15,352	96.66	
Invalid/blank votes	530	3.34	
Total votes	15,882	100.00	
Registered voters/turnout	29,893	53.13	

Incumbent mayor Ninoslav Erić of the Serbian Progressive Party was confirmed for another term in office after the election.

===== Despotovac =====
Results of the election for the Municipal Assembly of Despotovac:

Party	Votes	%	Seats
Aleksandar Vučić–Serbia Is Winning (Serbian Progressive Party, Party of United Pensioners of Serbia)	6,434	50.75	25
For the Survival and Development of the Municipality and the Mine-Democratic Party, Social Democratic Party–Dr. Zlatko Dragosavljević	3,068	24.20	11
Ivica Dačić–Socialist Party of Serbia (SPS), United Serbia (JS)–Dragan Marković Palma, New Serbia (NS)–List Bearer Dr. Miroslav Pavković	2,005	15.81	7
Russian Party–Dušan Ivković	730	5.76	2
Dr. Vojislav Šešelj–Serbian Radical Party	442	3.49	–
Total	12,679	100.00	45
Valid votes	12,679	97.28	
Invalid/blank votes	354	2.72	
Total votes	13,033	100.00	
Registered voters/turnout	23,592	55.24	

Nikola Nikolić of the Serbian Progressive Party was chosen as mayor after the election.

===== Paraćin =====
Results of the election for the Municipal Assembly of Paraćin:

Party	Votes	%	Seats
Saša Paunović–Surely Forward for Paraćin–Together for Serbia–New Party–Liberal Democratic Party–Democratic Party	9,222	31.29	19
Aleksandar Vučić–Serbia Is Winning (Serbian Progressive Party, Social Democratic Party of Serbia)	6,812	23.12	14
All for Paraćin–Tomislav Šaletić	4,604	15.62	9
Ivica Dačić–"Socialist Party of Serbia (SPS), United Serbia (JS)–Dragan Marković Palma"	2,347	7.96	4
Movement for the Village and the City–Ecological Movement	1,972	6.69	4
New Concept–Different Paraćin	1,950	6.62	4
Independent Paraćin Socialists with Dignity for Paraćin, Radomir Milutinović Rada	1,071	3.63	–
Dr. Vojislav Šešelj–Serbian Radical Party	532	1.81	–
Serbian-Russian Movement–Dr. Borislava Stolić Buca	528	1.79	1
Serbian Movement Dveri–Tomislav Milanović	430	1.46	–
Total	29,468	100.00	55
Valid votes	29,468	96.96	
Invalid/blank votes	925	3.04	
Total votes	30,393	100.00	
Registered voters/turnout	49,529	61.36	

Incumbent mayor Saśa Paunović of the Democratic Party was confirmed for another term in office after the election. He left the party in early 2020 and served as an independent.

===== Rekovac =====
Results of the election for the Municipal Assembly of Rekovac:

Party	Votes	%	Seats
Ivica Dačić–Socialist Party of Serbia	2,048	30.25	11
Aleksandar Vučić–Serbia Is Winning (Serbian Progressive Party)	1,878	27.74	10
SDS–Dr. Dragan Prodanović	890	13.15	4
Dragan Marković Palma–United Serbia (JS)	728	10.75	4
Democratic Party	461	6.81	2
Citizens' Group: Levač Levčanima	370	5.47	2
Dveri–Democratic Party of Serbia–Dušan Jevremović	274	4.05	–
Serbian-Russian Movement–Slavoljub Đurđević	121	1.79	–
Total	6,770	100.00	33
Valid votes	6,770	96.87	
Invalid/blank votes	219	3.13	
Total votes	6,989	100.00	
Registered voters/turnout	9,685	72.16	

Pavle Mijajlović of the Serbian Progressive Party was chosen as mayor after the election with the support of seventeen delegates. The government initially consisted of the Progressives (whose ranks had expanded after the vote via flyovers) and the Social Democratic Party. This administration fell after only thirty-two days, and a new government was briefly formed in June 2022 by the Socialist Party of Serbia, United Serbia, and the Democratic Party; Predrag Đorđević of the Socialist Party of Serbia served as mayor. This administration, too, fell shortly thereafter, and Aleksandar Đorđević of the Progressives was chosen as mayor in July 2016, leading a coalition government with United Serbia.

===== Svilajnac =====
Results of the election for the Municipal Assembly of Svilajnac:

Party	Votes	%	Seats
Citizens' Group: Svilajnac Protects the Future–Predrag Milanović	6,474	46.97	24
Aleksandar Vučić–Serbia Is Winning (Serbian Progressive Party, Social Democratic Party of Serbia, Party of United Pensioners of Serbia, Movement of Socialists)	5,309	38.52	19
Ivica Dačić–Socialist Party of Serbia, United Serbia (JS)–Dragan Marković Palma	1,284	9.32	4
Democratic Party of Serbia–Serbian Movement Dveri–Gorica Goca Gajić	717	5.20	–
Total	13,784	100.00	47
Valid votes	13,784	95.99	
Invalid/blank votes	576	4.01	
Total votes	14,360	100.00	
Registered voters/turnout	25,145	57.11	

Incumbent mayor Predrag Milanović was confirmed for another term in office after the election, leading a coalition government that comprised his own independent list and the Socialist Party of Serbia.

Gorica Gajić of the Democratic Party of Serbia appeared in the lead position on her party's coalition list with Dveri. The list received 4.99% of the total votes cast in the municipality (including invalid votes) and thereby missed the electoral threshold by the narrowest of margins.

==== Rasina District ====
Local elections were held in the one city (Kruševac) and all five other municipalities of the Rasina District. The Serbian Progressive Party and its allies won a majority victory in Kruševac; the Progressive alliance also won plurality victories in Trstenik and Varvarin, and in each case formed government afterward.

Milutin Jeličić led New Serbia to a majority victory in Brus; he joined the Progressive Party in 2017. Jugoslav Stajkovac's independent list won a majority victory in Aleksandrovac; when he retired in 2019, he was replaced by a member of the Progressive Party.

The only municipality where the Progressives did not hold power by 2020 was Ćićevac, where Zlatan Krkić's independent group had won a majority victory.

===== Kruševac =====
Results of the election for the City Assembly of Kruševac:

Party	Votes	%	Seats
Aleksandar Vučić–Serbia Is Winning (Serbian Progressive Party, Party of United Pensioners of Serbia, Movement of Socialists, Social Democratic Party of Serbia, Serbian People's Party, New Serbia, United Peasant Party)	32,288	54.22	52
Ivica Dačić–Socialist Party of Serbia/SPS–United Serbia/JS	7,721	12.96	12
For a Fair Kruševac–Democratic Party–Dr. Branislav Katančević (Democratic Party, Rusyn Democratic Party)	4,112	6.90	6
Dr. Vojislav Šešelj–Serbian Radical Party	2,614	4.39	–
Citizens' Group: Enough Is Enough–Saša Radulović	2,328	3.91	–
Boris Tadić–The Awakening of Kruševac, SDS, LDP, Serbian Left	2,052	3.45	–
Democratic Party of Serbia–Saša Anđelković	2,034	3.42	–
Dveri–For the Life of Kruševac–Goran Tišić	1,805	3.03	–
I Love Kruševac	1,778	2.99	–
For Kruševac–Miodrag Đidić	1,360	2.28	–
Republican Party–Predrag Petronijević	956	1.61	–
Civic Alternative of Serbia–For Kruševac	505	0.85	–
Total	59,553	100.00	70
Valid votes	59,553	97.02	
Invalid/blank votes	1,827	2.98	
Total votes	61,380	100.00	
Registered voters/turnout	109,883	55.86	

Incumbent mayor Dragi Nestorović of the Serbian Progressive Party was confirmed for another term in office after the election. He died on 21 October 2017. On 25 December 2017, Jasmina Palurović of the Progressive Party was chosen as his successor.

===== Aleksandrovac =====
Results of the election for the Municipal Assembly of Aleksandrovac:

Party	Votes	%	Seats
Citizens' Group: Movement for the Parish–Dr. Jugoslav Stajkovac	7,641	52.09	32
Aleksandar Vučić–Serbia Is Winning (Serbian Progressive Party)	3,310	22.57	13
"Choice of the New Generation–Ivan Novaković" (Democratic Party, SDS, LDP, Sandžak Raška Party)	1,421	9.69	5
"Ivica Dačić–Socialist Party of Serbia (SPS), Dragan Marković Palma–United Serbia (JS)"	1,262	8.60	5
Democratic Party of Serbia–Dveri–Dr. Ljubiša Pantić	1,034	7.05	4
Total	14,668	100.00	59
Valid votes	14,668	96.03	
Invalid/blank votes	607	3.97	
Total votes	15,275	100.00	
Registered voters/turnout	23,373	65.35	

Incumbent mayor Jugoslav Stajkovac was confirmed for another term in office after the election. He retired in March 2019 and was replaced by Mirko Mihajlović of the Serbian Progressive Party.

===== Brus =====
Results of the election for the Municipal Assembly of Brus:

Party	Votes	%	Seats
New Serbia Milutin Jeličić-Jutka	5,211	53.42	19
Aleksandar Vučić–Serbia Is Winning (Serbian Progressive Party)	1,971	20.21	7
Ivica Dačić–Socialist Party of Serbia (SPS)–Democratic Party of Serbia (DSS)	543	5.57	2
Citizens' Group: "Disko Predolac"–Radisav Predolac-Disko	532	5.45	1
United Serbia Dragan Marković "Palma"	406	4.16	–
Citizens' Group: "Count on Us"–Dejan Džodić-Džoda	319	3.27	–
Serbian Radical Party–Dr. Vojislav Šešelj	316	3.24	–
Democratic Party–Goran Miljojković	240	2.46	–
Serbian People's Party–Nenad Popović, Aleksandar Marković	216	2.21	–
Total	9,754	100.00	29
Valid votes	9,754	95.30	
Invalid/blank votes	481	4.70	
Total votes	10,235	100.00	
Registered voters/turnout	14,181	72.17	

Incumbent mayor Milutin Jeličić of New Serbia was confirmed for another term in office after the election. In August 2017, he joined the Serbian Progressive Party.

Jeličić announced his resignation as mayor on 1 March 2019 after being charged with sexual harassment. He was replaced by Saśa Milošević, also of the Progressive Party.

===== Ćićevac =====
Results of the election for the Municipal Assembly of Ćićevac:

Party	Votes	%	Seats
Citizens' Group: Movement for the Preservation of the Municipality of Ćićevac–Zlatan Krkić	2,587	43.41	13
Aleksandar Vučić–Serbia Is Winning (Serbian Progressive Party, Party of United Pensioners of Serbia)	1,650	27.69	8
Dr. "Batke" Zoran Milivojević–New Serbia	993	16.66	4
Ivica Dačić–Socialist Party of Serbia (SPS)	223	3.74	–
Social Democratic Party of Serbia–Nebojša Petković-Hans	166	2.79	–
United Serbia–Dragan Marković Palma	115	1.93	–
Dr. Vojislav Šešelj–Serbian Radical Party	99	1.66	–
United Opposition of the Municipality of Ćićevac	96	1.61	–
Serbian Movement Dveri–Prof. Igor Biševac	30	0.50	–
Total	5,959	100.00	25
Valid votes	5,959	97.59	
Invalid/blank votes	147	2.41	
Total votes	6,106	100.00	
Registered voters/turnout	7,820	78.08	

Incumbent mayor Zlatan Krkić was confirmed for another term in office after the election, leading an administration that included his own independent list and New Serbia.

===== Trstenik =====
Results of the election for the Municipal Assembly of Trstenik:

Party	Votes	%	Seats
Aleksandar Vučić–Serbia Is Winning (Serbian Progressive Party, Social Democratic Party of Serbia, Party of United Pensioners of Serbia, Movement of Socialists, New Serbia, Serbian People's Party)	8,272	36.68	19
Miroslav Aleksić–Together With the People (Social Democratic Party–People's Movement of Serbia, Rusyn Democratic Party)	8,052	35.70	19
Serbian Renewal Movement–For the Common Good–Dr. Radovan Popović	2,485	11.02	6
Ivica Dačić–"Socialist Party of Serbia (SPS), United Serbia (JS), Dragan Marković Palma	1,895	8.40	4
Dr. Vojislav Šešelj–Serbian Radical Party	910	4.03	–
Serbian-Russian Movement–Slobodan Dimitrijević	580	2.57	1
Democratic Party–It Can Be Better	359	1.59	–
Total	22,553	100.00	49
Valid votes	22,553	96.11	
Invalid/blank votes	912	3.89	
Total votes	23,465	100.00	
Registered voters/turnout	37,363	62.80	

Aleksandar Ćirić of the Serbian Progressive Party was chosen as mayor after the election, leading an administration that also included the Socialist Party of Serbia and the Serbian Renewal Movement.

Miroslav Aleksić, who had served as mayor in the previous term, was re-elected to the assembly at the lead of the Together With the People coalition list. In 2017, he allowed his People's Movement of Serbia to be reconstituted as the People's Party under Vuk Jeremić's leadership and became a vice-president of the new party.

===== Varvarin =====
Results of the election for the Municipal Assembly of Varvarin:

Party	Votes	%	Seats
Aleksandar Vučić–Serbia Is Winning (Serbian Progressive Party)	3,895	39.05	17
Serbian Renewal Movement–Zoran Milenković	3,248	32.56	14
Ivica Dačić–"Socialist Party of Serbia (SPS), United Serbia (JS)–Dragoljub Stanojević	1,879	18.84	8
Temnićka Alternative–Bratislav Petrović	572	5.73	2
Dr. Vojislav Šešelj–Serbian Radical Party	380	3.81	–
Total	9,974	100.00	41
Valid votes	9,974	95.42	
Invalid/blank votes	479	4.58	
Total votes	10,453	100.00	
Registered voters/turnout	16,197	64.54	

Vojkan Pavić of the Serbian Progressive Party was chosen as mayor after the election with the support of twenty-six delegates.

==== Raška District ====
Local elections were held in the two cities (Kraljevo and Novi Pazar) and the three other municipalities of the Raška District. The Serbian Progressive Party and its allies won in the predominantly Serb municipalities of Kraljevo, Raška, and Vrnjačka Banja. The Sandžak Democratic Party won in the predominantly Bosniak city of Novi Pazar, while the Party of Democratic Action of Sandžak won in Tutin, also a predominantly Bosniak community.

===== Kraljevo =====
Results of the election for the City Assembly of Kraljevo:

Party	Votes	%	Seats
Aleksandar Vučić–Serbia Is Winning (Serbian Progressive Party, Movement of Socialists, Party of United Pensioners of Serbia, Social Democratic Party of Serbia, Serbian Renewal Movement, Serbian People's Party, Christian Democratic Party of Serbia)	21,681	38.62	34
Ivica Dačić–"Socialist Party of Serbia (SPS), United Serbia (JS)–Dragan Marković Palma"	7,030	12.52	11
Dveri–For Bringing Life Back to Kraljevo–Dragan Vesović	3,800	6.77	6
Citizens' Group: Local Front	3,404	6.06	5
Citizens' Group: Longtime Residents of Kraljevo and its Surroundings	3,148	5.61	5
Dr. Vojislav Šešelj–Serbian Radical Party	3,099	5.52	5
For a Better and Fair Kraljevo (Democratic Party, Liberal Democratic Party, Rusyn Democratic Party–NPS)–Vukomir Mitrović	3,019	5.38	4
Velja Ilić New Serbia–Srpska Sloga	2,218	3.95	–
PULS Serbia–Dr. Ljubiša Jovašević	1,954	3.48	–
Democratic Party of Serbia–Sanda Rašković Ivić	1,872	3.33	–
Citizens' Group: Unanimously for Kraljevo	1,772	3.16	–
Enough Is Enough Saša Radulović	1,457	2.60	–
"Social Democratic Party–Together for Serbia"	812	1.45	–
Kraljevo for All of Us–Borko Stefanović	519	0.92	–
None of the Above	350	0.62	–
Total	56,135	100.00	70
Valid votes	56,135	97.26	
Invalid/blank votes	1,581	2.74	
Total votes	57,716	100.00	
Registered voters/turnout	102,960	56.06	

Predrag Terzić of the Serbian Progressive Party was chosen as mayor after the election.

United Serbia parliamentarian Marija Jevđić was re-elected to the city assembly from the third position on the Socialist-led list.

Vesna Nikolić Vukajlović was elected from the lead position on the Radical Party's list.

===== Novi Pazar =====
Results of the election for the City Assembly of Novi Pazar:

Party	Votes	%	Seats
"For a European Novi Pazar–Rasim Ljajić" (Sandžak Democratic Party, Social Democratic Party of Serbia, Party for Sandžak, Bosniak Democratic Union, Liberal Democratic Party)	16,655	36.07	18
"SDA Sandžak–Dr. Sulejman Ugljanin"	10,381	22.48	11
"Muamer Zukorlić–Bosniak Democratic Union of Sandžak"	9,459	20.48	10
"Aleksandar Vučić–Serbia Is Winning" (Serbian Progressive Party, Socialist Party of Serbia, New Serbia, United Serbia, Party of United Pensioners of Serbia, Movement of Socialists)	4,455	9.65	5
"Sandžak People's Party–Dr. Mirsad Ðerlek"	2,810	6.09	3
"Serb List–Serbian Radical Party–Dveri–Democratic Party of Serbia"	1,267	2.74	–
Citizens' Group: New Movement–Rešad Hodžić	877	1.90	–
Citizens' Group: Spring	128	0.28	–
Awakening–Zaim Hadžisalihović	112	0.24	–
Citizens' Group: People's Movement	33	0.07	–
Total	46,177	100.00	47
Valid votes	46,177	97.44	
Invalid/blank votes	1,211	2.56	
Total votes	47,388	100.00	
Registered voters/turnout	83,968	56.44	

Nihat Biševac of the Sandžak Democratic Party was chosen as mayor after the election.

Parliamentarian Enis Imamović was elected from the lead position on the SDA list. He resigned on 27 June 2016.

Candidates elected on the Bosniak Democratic Union of Sandžak list included Chief Mufti Muamer Zukorlić (#1 on the list), party leader Jahja Fehratović (#2), Misala Pramenković (#3), and Amela Lukač Zoranić (#6).

===== Raška =====
Results of the election for the Municipal Assembly of Raška:

Party	Votes	%	Seats
Aleksandar Vučić–Serbia Is Winning (Serbian Progressive Party, Party of United Pensioners of Serbia, Movement of Socialists, Social Democratic Party of Serbia, Independent Democratic Party of Serbia)	7,338	50.91	19
Ivica Dačić–"Socialist Party of Serbia (SPS), United Serbia (JS)	4,561	31.64	12
Dveri–Democratic Party of Serbia Sanda Rašković Ivić–Boško Obradović	1,020	7.08	2
For a Better Raška Draško Radosavljević, Democratic Party	794	5.51	2
Dr. Vojislav Šešelj–Serbian Radical Party	702	4.87	–
Total	14,415	100.00	35
Valid votes	14,415	97.56	
Invalid/blank votes	361	2.44	
Total votes	14,776	100.00	
Registered voters/turnout	20,515	72.03	

Incumbent mayor Ignjat Rakitić of the Serbian Progressive Party was confirmed for another term in office after the election.

===== Tutin =====
Results of the election for the Municipal Assembly of Tutin:

Party	Votes	%	Seats
"SDA Sandžak–Dr. Sulejman Ugljanin"	8,877	56.00	22
"For a European Tutin–Rasim Ljajić" (Sandžak Democratic Party, Social Democratic Party of Serbia)	3,856	24.33	9
"Muamer Zukorlić–Bosniak Democratic Union of Sandžak"	2,409	15.20	6
"Aleksandar Vučić–Serbia Is Winning" (Serbian Progressive Party, New Serbia, Social Democratic Party, Movement of Socialists)	391	2.47	–
Tutin First of All–BNS–Mujo Muković	319	2.01	–
Total	15,852	100.00	37
Valid votes	15,852	98.62	
Invalid/blank votes	222	1.38	
Total votes	16,074	100.00	
Registered voters/turnout	30,385	52.90	

Incumbent mayor Šemsudin Kučević of the Party of Democratic Action of Sandžak was confirmed for another term in office after the election. He died in a car accident in October 2017. The following month, the assembly chose Kenan Hot, also of the Party of Democratic Action of Sandžak, as his replacement.

Bajro Gegić was elected from the second position on the Party of Democratic Action of Sandžak list. Zaim Redžepović was elected from the second position on the Bosniak Democratic Union of Sandžak list.

===== Vrnjačka Banja =====
Results of the election for the Municipal Assembly of Vrnjačka Banja:

Party	Votes	%	Seats
Aleksandar Vučić–Serbia Is Winning (Serbian Progressive Party, Social Democratic Party of Serbia, Party of United Pensioners of Serbia, Movement of Socialists, New Serbia, Active Serbia)	7,984	52.09	16
United Serbia–Dragan Marković Palma	2,428	15.84	4
Democratic Party–Banja Is the Law	1,248	8.14	2
Ivica Dačić–Socialist Party of Serbia (SPS)	1,186	7.74	2
Boris Tadić SDS–LDP–SPO Vrnjačka Banja	799	5.21	1
Dr. Vojislav Šešelj–Serbian Radical Party	646	4.21	–
Serbian Movement Dveri–Democratic Party of Serbia	619	4.04	–
Enough Is Enough–Saša Radulović	418	2.73	–
Total	15,328	100.00	25
Valid votes	15,328	97.04	
Invalid/blank votes	467	2.96	
Total votes	15,795	100.00	
Registered voters/turnout	23,811	66.33	

Incumbent mayor Boban Đurović of the Serbian Progressive Party was confirmed for another term in office after the election.

==== Šumadija District ====
Local elections were held in the one city (Kragujevac) and five of the six other municipalities of the Šumadija District. The exception was Aranđelovac, where the last election had been held in 2014.

The Progressives and their allies won plurality victories in Kragujevac, Batočina, and Knić and formed government in all three communities. In Topola, an alliance led by the Progressives and New Serbia won a majority victory. The Serbian Renewal Movement won a narrow plurality victory in Lapovo and formed a coalition government with the Progressives; a member of the Serbian Renewal Movement initially served as mayor but was replaced by a Progressive Party member in 2017.

The Social Democratic Party won a narrow victory in Rača; shortly after the election, the party's entire elected membership joined the Progressives.

===== Kragujevac =====
Results of the election for the City Assembly of Kragujevac:

Party	Votes	%	Seats
Aleksandar Vučić–Serbia Is Winning (Serbian Progressive Party, New Serbia, Party of United Pensioners of Serbia, Social Democratic Party of Serbia)	31,360	35.72	40
Veroljub Verko Stevanović–Together for Kragujevac (Democratic Party, Together for Serbia)	19,363	22.06	24
Ivica Dačić–Socialist Party of Serbia (SPS), United Serbia (JS)–Dragan Marković - Palma	8,446	9.62	10
Boris Tadić–For Our City–Social Democratic Party (Social Democratic Party, Rusyn Democratic Party)	4,735	5.39	6
All for Kragujevac–Milan Urošević–(LDP-SPO)	4,658	5.31	6
Citizens' Group: Slađan Rakić–Kragujevac Initiative Eko Park	4,205	4.79	–
Enough Is Enough–Saša Radulović	3,175	3.62	–
Dr. Vojislav Šešelj–Serbian Radical Party	2,911	3.32	–
Democratic Party of Serbia–Dveri–Sanda Rašković Ivić–Boško Obradović	2,785	3.17	–
Movement of Socialists, Movement of Veterans–Aleksandar Vulin	2,613	2.98	–
Russian Party–Ilija Radosanović	1,074	1.22	1
Citizens' Group: Definitely Better–Dr. Vladan Vučićević	811	0.92	–
Democratic Union of Roma	676	0.77	–
Green Party Marijana Tucaković Veljković	505	0.58	–
Serbian People's Party–Nenad Popović	470	0.54	–
Total	87,787	100.00	87
Valid votes	87,787	97.40	
Invalid/blank votes	2,341	2.60	
Total votes	90,128	100.00	
Registered voters/turnout	154,277	58.42	

Incumbent mayor Radomir Nikolić of the Progressive Party was confirmed for another term in office after the election.

The local party New Strength (Nova Snaga) contested the election on the list of the Social Democratic Party. Party leader and future parliamentarian Nikola Nešić received the seventh position on the SDS's list; he was not immediately elected, but he received a mandate on 6 June 2016 as the replacement for another member.

Future parliamentarian Slađana Radisavljević of the Democratic Party of Serbia appeared in the third position on that party's combined list with Dveri.

===== Aranđelovac =====
There was no election for the Municipal Assembly of Aranđelovac in 2016. The previous election had taken place in 2014, and the next took place in 2018.

===== Batočina =====
Results of the election for the Municipal Assembly of Batočina:

Party	Votes	%	Seats
Aleksandar Vučić–Serbia Is Winning (Serbian Progressive Party, Movement of Socialists, Social Democratic Party of Serbia)	2,900	40.46	17
Democratic Party–Dr. Ana Aničić(Democratic Party, Together for Serbia)	1,919	26.77	11
United Serbia–Dragan Marković Palma	504	7.03	3
Socialist Party of Serbia (SPS)–Ivica Dačić	413	5.76	2
Citizens' Group: Together for Batočina–Veroljub Verko Stevanović	389	5.43	2
Citizens' Group: Patriotic Front for Batočina–For the Salvation of Our Municipality	295	4.12	–
Serbian Radical Party–Dr. Vojislav Šešelj	232	3.24	–
Democratic Party of Serbia DSS–Slađan Krstić	227	3.17	–
Coalition: Alliance for a Better Batočina–Boris Tadić SDS, LDP	197	2.75	–
Party of United Pensioners of Serbia–Dragan Todorović Cvrle	92	1.28	–
Total	7,168	100.00	35
Valid votes	7,168	97.00	
Invalid/blank votes	222	3.00	
Total votes	7,390	100.00	
Registered voters/turnout	10,142	72.87	

Zdravko Mladenović of the Progressive Party was chosen as mayor after the election.

===== Knić =====
Results of the election for the Municipal Assembly of Knić:

Party	Votes	%	Seats
Aleksandar Vučić–Serbia Is Winning (Serbian Progressive Party)	3,052	41.92	16
"Ivica Dačić–Socialist Party of Serbia (SPS)"	822	11.29	4
Democratic Party–Vesna Perović	762	10.47	3
Nikola Čamperović–LDP Čedomir Jovanović–SDS Boris Tadić–It's Time	617	8.47	3
Citizens' Group: Movement for a Better Municipality of Knić–Milić Milović	595	8.17	3
New Serbia–Velimir Ilić	538	7.39	2
United Serbia–Ljubomir Đurđević Knić	433	5.95	2
"Democratic Party of Serbia–Dveri - Patrons"	296	4.07	–
Russian Party Dobrivoje Miladinović	166	2.28	–
Total	7,281	100.00	33
Valid votes	7,281	96.64	
Invalid/blank votes	253	3.36	
Total votes	7,534	100.00	
Registered voters/turnout	11,303	66.65	

Zoran Đorović of the Progressive Party was chosen as mayor after the election. He resigned in July 2018 and was replaced by Miroslav Nikolić of the same party.

===== Lapovo =====
Results of the election for the Municipal Assembly of Lapovo:

Party	Votes	%	Seats
All for Lapovo–Saša Ivković (Serbian Renewal Movement)	1,547	35.51	11
Aleksandar Vučić–Serbia Is Winning (Serbian Progressive Party, Movement of Socialists)	1,359	31.20	10
The Best for Lapovo–Nebojša Miletić (Democratic Party)	458	10.51	3
Citizens' Group: For the Life of Lapovo	365	8.38	2
Dr. Vojislav Šešelj–Serbian Radical Party	263	6.04	2
"Ivica Dačić–Socialist Party of Serbia (SPS), United Serbia (JS)–Dragan Marković Palma"	221	5.07	–
Russian Party–Petrović Goran	143	3.28	1
Total	4,356	100.00	29
Valid votes	4,356	95.44	
Invalid/blank votes	208	4.56	
Total votes	4,564	100.00	
Registered voters/turnout	6,922	65.93	

Saša Ivković of the Serbian Renewal Movement was chosen as mayor after the election, in an alliance with the Progressive Party. The Serbian Renewal Movement split in 2017, and Ivković and his assembly group joined the breakaway Movement for the Restoration of the Kingdom of Serbia. He stood down as mayor on 21 September 2017 and was replaced by Boban Miličić of the Progressive Party.

===== Rača =====
Results of the election for the Municipal Assembly of Rača:

Party	Votes	%	Seats
Victory for Rača–Aleksandar Senić, SDS-LDP	2,370	35.39	12
Aleksandar Vučić–Serbia Is Winning (Serbian Progressive Party, Movement of Socialists, Serbian Renewal Movement, Party of United Pensioners of Serbia)	1,882	28.11	9
Ivica Dačić–Socialist Party of Serbia	782	11.68	4
Democratic Party–Dragana Živanović	768	11.47	4
New Serbia–Dragan Jovanović	397	5.93	2
Dr. Vojislav Šešelj–Serbian Radical Party	206	3.08	–
Democratic Party of Serbia–Dveri	155	2.31	–
Russian Party	136	2.03	–
Total	6,696	100.00	31
Valid votes	6,696	97.23	
Invalid/blank votes	191	2.77	
Total votes	6,887	100.00	
Registered voters/turnout	9,742	70.69	

Nenad Savković of the Social Democratic Party was chosen as mayor after the election. Shortly thereafter, the Social Democratic Party's entire municipal board (including Savković) resigned its membership. They later joined the Progressives.

===== Topola =====
Results of the election for the Municipal Assembly of Topola:

Party	Votes	%	Seats
Aleksandar Vučić–Dragan Jovanović–Topola Is Winning (Serbian Progressive Party, New Serbia, Democratic Party of Serbia, Party of United Pensioners of Serbia, Serbian Renewal Movement)	7,056	64.39	29
Citizens' Group: New People–Better Topola	1,469	13.41	6
Ivica Dačić–Socialist Party of Serbia (SPS), United Serbia (JS) Dragan Marković - Palma, Serbian People's Party (SNP)	1,208	11.02	4
Dr. Vojislav Šešelj–Serbian Radical Party	685	6.25	2
Honestly! Democratic Party–Liberal Democratic Party–Topola	540	4.93	–
Total	10,958	100.00	41
Valid votes	10,958	96.81	
Invalid/blank votes	361	3.19	
Total votes	11,319	100.00	
Registered voters/turnout	18,812	60.17	

Incumbent mayor Dragan Živanović of New Serbia was confirmed for another term in office after the election. Dragan Jovanović was chosen as speaker of the assembly.

New Serbia split in early 2017, Jovanović formed a new party called Better Serbia. Živanović sided with Jovanović and became a member of the party.

==== Zlatibor District ====
Local elections were held in the one city (i.e., Užice) and eight of the nine separate municipalities of the Zlatibor District. The exception was Kosjerić, where the previous local election had taken place in 2013.

The Serbian Progressive Party's coalition won majority victories in Užice and Priboj as well as plurality victories in Arilje, Bajina Bašta, Nova Varoš, Požega, and Prijepolje; in all of these municipalities, Progressive Party delegates were chosen as mayor. Milan Stamatović of the Serbian People's Party led his alliance to a majority victory in Čajetina, and the Party of Democratic Action of Sandžak won in Sjenica.

The city of Užice is divided into two municipalities: Užice and Sevojno. The municipality of Užice does not have direct assembly elections: members of the city assembly also serve at the municipal level. Delegates to the Municipal Assembly of Sevojno are elected, although there was no election in 2016; the previous vote had taken place in 2014.

===== Užice =====
Results of the election for the City Assembly of Užice:

Party	Votes	%	Seats
Aleksandar Vučić–Serbia Is Winning (Serbian Progressive Party, Party of United Pensioners of Serbia, New Serbia, Social Democratic Party of Serbia, Movement for a Positive Užice, Strength of Serbia Movement, Movement of Socialists)	17,131	45.25	34
Jovan Marković–The Best for Užice (Democratic Party, Liberal Democratic Party, Social Democratic Party, Serbian People's Party, New Party)	7,548	19.94	15
"Ivica Dačić–Socialist Party of Serbia (SPS), United Serbia (JS) Dragan Marković Palma, Active Serbia (AS)"	4,508	11.91	8
Dr. Vojislav Šešelj–Serbian Radical Party	2,392	6.32	4
Democratic Party of Serbia-Dveri, Složno-Užički!	2,284	6.03	4
Citizens' Group: For Change	1,730	4.57	–
Green Party, Prof. Dr. Miloš Tasić	1,365	3.61	2
Serbian Renewal Movement	902	2.38	–
Total	37,860	100.00	67
Valid votes	37,860	97.00	
Invalid/blank votes	1,171	3.00	
Total votes	39,031	100.00	
Registered voters/turnout	68,004	57.40	

Incumbent mayor Tihomir Petković of the Serbian Progressive Party was confirmed for another term in office after the election.

Former parliamentarian Bogoljub Zečević was a nominal candidate on the "For Change" list, appearing in the twenty-second position.

====== Užice: Sevojno ======
There was no election for the Municipal Assembly of Sevojno in 2016. The previous election had taken place in 2014, and the next election took place in the 2018.

===== Arilje =====
Results of the election for the Municipal Assembly of Arilje:

Party	Votes	%	Seats
Aleksandar Vučić–Serbia Is Winning (Serbian Progressive Party, Serbian Renewal Movement, Social Democratic Party of Serbia, New Serbia, Party of United Pensioners of Serbia)	4,034	41.44	15
Dr. Zoran Mićović–DS, SDS, NOVA–Provereno Najbolje	2,562	26.32	10
Citizens' Group: "We Can Do Better–Irena Mijailović	991	10.18	3
Dr. Vojislav Šešelj–Serbian Radical Party	764	7.85	2
Ivica Dačić–SPS, JS–Dragan Marković Palma	610	6.27	2
Citizens' Group: Movement of Workers and Peasants–Dragiša Terzić	538	5.53	2
Dveri	235	2.41	–
Total	9,734	100.00	34
Valid votes	9,734	96.12	
Invalid/blank votes	393	3.88	
Total votes	10,127	100.00	
Registered voters/turnout	15,893	63.72	

Incumbent mayor Zoran Todorović of the Progressive Party was confirmed for another term in office after the election. He resigned in September 2018 and was replaced by Miloš Nedeljković of the same party.

===== Bajina Bašta =====
Results of the election for the Municipal Assembly of Bajina Bašta:

Party	Votes	%	Seats
Aleksandar Vučić–Serbia Is Winning (Serbian Progressive Party, Movement of Socialists, Party of United Pensioners of Serbia, New Serbia, Serbian Renewal Movement)	5,574	43.39	21
Ivica Dačić–"Socialist Party of Serbia (SPS), United Serbia (JS)"	2,458	19.13	9
Democratic Party of Serbia Bajina Bašta–Vasilije Pavićević	1,206	9.39	4
Responsible for Bajina Bašta (Democratic Party, Liberal Democratic Party)	1,182	9.20	4
Dr. Vojislav Šešelj–Serbian Radical Party Dr. Miroslav Nešković Žućo	1,094	8.52	4
Dveri for the Life of Bajina Bašta – Miroslav Mićo Lukić	948	7.38	3
SDS–Boris Tadić–For a Better Bajina Bašta	385	3.00	–
Total	12,847	100.00	45
Valid votes	12,847	95.81	
Invalid/blank votes	562	4.19	
Total votes	13,409	100.00	
Registered voters/turnout	22,177	60.46	

Incumbent mayor Radomir Filipović of the Serbian Progressive Party was confirmed for another term in office after the election with the support of thirty-seven delegates.

===== Čajetina =====
Results of the election for the Municipal Assembly of Čajetina:

Party	Votes	%	Seats
SNP–DSS–PUPS–Milan Stamatović	5,615	58.02	21
"Aleksandar Vučić–Serbia Is Winning" (Serbian Progressive Party)	1,987	20.53	7
Citizens' Group: Zlatiborski pogled–Rajko Pelverović-Pela	986	10.19	3
Ivica Dačić–"Socialist Party of Serbia" (SPS)	447	4.62	–
List for a Better Čajetina–Strajin Nedović, Radovan Jojić (Democratic Party, Social Democratic Party, Liberal Democratic Party)	415	4.29	–
Dveri–Čajetina	137	1.42	–
Dr. Vojislav Šešelj–Serbian Radical Party	91	0.94	–
Total	9,678	100.00	31
Valid votes	9,678	97.09	
Invalid/blank votes	290	2.91	
Total votes	9,968	100.00	
Registered voters/turnout	12,851	77.57	

Incumbent mayor Milan Stamatović of the Serbian People's Party (SNP) was confirmed for another term in office after the election. He left the SNP in 2017 and founded the Healthy Serbia party.

Bojana Božanić of the Serbian People's Party was elected to the assembly from the third position on the SNP's coalition list. She resigned her seat on 9 May 2016.

Future parliamentarian Đorđe Dabić was elected from the fourth position on the Progressive Party's list.

===== Kosjerić =====
There was no municipal election in Kosjerić in 2016. The previous election had taken place in 2013, and the next election took place in 2017.

===== Nova Varoš =====
Results of the election for the Municipal Assembly of Nova Varoš:

Party	Votes	%	Seats
"Aleksandar Vučić–Serbia Is Winning" (Serbian Progressive Party, Movement of Socialists, Party of United Pensioners of Serbia)	3,673	35.20	12
Citizens' Group: Radosav Rade Vasiljević–New People for Nova Varoš	2,369	22.70	7
Democratic Party	1,644	15.75	5
Ivica Dačić–"Socialist Party of Serbia" (SPS)	599	5.74	1
New Serbia–Velimir Ilić	562	5.39	1
Citizens' Group: Murtenica	454	4.35	–
SDP–For Nova Varoš	307	2.94	1
Boris Tadić, Čedomir Jovanović–For a Better Nova Varoš–Social Democratic Party and Liberal Democratic Party	295	2.83	–
Dr. Vojislav Šešelj–Serbian Radical Party	290	2.78	–
Muamer Zukorlić–Bosniak Democratic Union of Sandžak	156	1.49	–
SDA Sandžak–Dr. Sulejman Ugljanin	51	0.49	–
"Roma Party" Irsad Pušija	36	0.34	–
Total	10,436	100.00	27
Valid votes	10,436	97.61	
Invalid/blank votes	255	2.39	
Total votes	10,691	100.00	
Registered voters/turnout	14,068	76.00	

Branko Bjelić of the Serbian Progressive Party was chosen as mayor after the election. The government was supported by the Progressive alliance, the Sandžak Democratic Party (SDP), and the Socialist Party of Serbia. A Progressive delegate later defected to the opposition, and in September 2016 a new administration was formed with Radosav Vasiljević as mayor. Vasiljević's administration was supported by his own citizens' group, the Democratic Party, and New Serbia.

Vasiljević formed a new coalition with the Progressives in 2017.

===== Požega =====
Results of the election for the Municipal Assembly of Požega:

Party	Votes	%	Seats
"Aleksandar Vučić–Serbia Is Winning"–Milan Božić (Serbian Progressive Party, Social Democratic Party of Serbia, Party of United Pensioners of Serbia, Movement of Socialists, New Serbia, Democratic Party of Serbia, Serbian People's Party)	6,300	45.55	25
Milovan Mićović–For Our Požega–Democratic Party–SPO–LDP–NOVA	3,253	23.52	13
Ivica Dačić–"Socialist Party of Serbia (SPS), United Serbia (JS)–Dragan Marković Palma"–Mikan Janković	1,937	14.00	7
Dr. Vojislav Šešelj–Serbian Radical Party–Vladan Kovačević	1,182	8.55	4
Dveri–For a Healthier Municipality of Požega–Čedomir Mandić	849	6.14	3
SDS Boris Tadić–You Still Have Someone to Vote For–Aco Strainović	311	2.25	–
Total	13,832	100.00	52
Valid votes	13,832	96.24	
Invalid/blank votes	540	3.76	
Total votes	14,372	100.00	
Registered voters/turnout	24,817	57.91	

Incumbent mayor Milan Božic of the Progressive Party was confirmed for another term in office after the election. He was removed from office in June 2019 after being arrested and was replaced by Đorđe Nikitović of the same party.

===== Priboj =====
Results of the election for the Municipal Assembly of Priboj:

Party	Votes	%	Seats
Aleksandar Vučić–Serbia Is Winning (Serbian Progressive Party, Movement of Socialists, Party of United Pensioners of Serbia, New Serbia, Serbian Renewal Movement)	5,846	41.56	22
SDA Sandžak–BDZ Sandžak	1,368	9.73	5
Socialist Party of Serbia–Ivica Dačić	1,318	9.37	4
Sandžak Democratic Party–Dr. Jasminko Toskić	1,057	7.51	4
Jasmin Hodžić–Priboj Is Also Our City–Marijana Bjelić (Social Democratic Party, Liberal Democratic Party)	1,056	7.51	3
DSS–Dveri–Vujadin Vujo Radović	1,008	7.17	3
Democratic Party Priboj	665	4.73	–
Citizens' Group: "For the Survival of FAP-a–Miroslav Mršević	612	4.35	–
Dr. Vojislav Šešelj–Serbian Radical Party–Vladan Kovačević	547	3.89	–
Citizens' Group: For the Live of Priboj	418	2.97	–
Serbian People's Party–Nenad Popović	171	1.22	–
Total	14,066	100.00	41
Valid votes	14,066	96.61	
Invalid/blank votes	493	3.39	
Total votes	14,559	100.00	
Registered voters/turnout	28,258	51.52	

Incumbent mayor Lazar Rvović of the Serbian Progressive Party was confirmed for another term in office after the election. Incumbent delegate and future parliamentarian Dijana Radović was elected from the third position on the Socialist list; she resigned her position on 15 June 2016.

===== Prijepolje =====
Results of the election for the Municipal Assembly of Prijepolje:

Party	Votes	%	Seats
Aleksandar Vučić–Serbia Is Winning–Ivica Dačić (Serbian Progressive Party, Socialist Party of Serbia)	6,029	30.88	14
Sandžak Democratic Party–Social Democratic Party of Serbia–Rasim Ljajić	4,144	21.22	9
Muamer Zukorlić–For Reconciliation BDZ Sandžak–LDP	2,254	11.54	5
DPS–Dr. Zulkefil Bato Sadović (Democratic Party of the Sandžak)	2,064	10.57	4
"Unanimously for Prijepolje–Democratic Party of Serbia–Serbian Radical Party–Together for Serbia"	1,667	8.54	3
Dveri–For the Salvation of Prijepolje–Borko Puškić	1,385	7.09	3
SDA Sandžak–Dr. Sulejman Ugljanin	1,289	6.60	3
Citizens' Group: New People–Vele Janjušević	695	3.56	–
Total	19,527	100.00	41
Valid votes	19,527	98.22	
Invalid/blank votes	354	1.78	
Total votes	19,881	100.00	
Registered voters/turnout	34,291	57.98	

Dragoljub Zindović of the Serbian Progressive Party was chosen as mayor after the election, with the support of twenty-five delegates.

Samir Tandir of the Bosniak Democratic Union of Sandžak was elected from the lead position on the BDZ Sandžak–LDP list, while Sabira Hadžiavdić of the same party was elected from the third position on the list. Hadžiavdić resigned from the assembly on 12 October 2016 after being appointed as acting director of the municipality's Center for Social Work.

Slobodan Gojković, former parliamentarian and leader of Together for Serbia's municipal board, appeared in the fourth position on the Unanimously for Prijepolje list and was not elected.

===== Sjenica =====
Results of the election for the Municipal Assembly of Sjenica:

Party	Votes	%	Seats
SDA Sandžak–Dr. Sulejman Ugljanin	5,201	34.95	15
For a European Sjenica–Rasim Ljajić (Sandžak Democratic Party, Social Democratic Party of Serbia)	2,644	17.77	8
Muamer Zukorlić–Bosniak Democratic Union of Sandžak	2,409	16.19	7
Ivica Dačić–Socialist Party of Serbia (SPS)	1,795	12.06	5
Aleksandar Vučić Coalition–Serbia Is Winning (Serbian Progressive Party, Socialist Party of Serbia, Party of United Pensioners of Serbia, New Serbia, Democratic Party of Serbia)	1,304	8.76	4
Citizens' Group: Independent Party of Democratic Action for Sjenica–Nusret Nuhović	481	3.23	–
Citizens' Group: League for Sjenica–Dr. Esad Zornić	462	3.10	–
Sandžak People's Party–Dr. Mirsad Ðerlek	253	1.70	–
Dr. Vojislav Šešelj Serbian Radical Party–Serbian Movement Dveri Boško Obradović	208	1.40	–
Bosniak People's Party–Mujo Muković	125	0.84	–
Total	14,882	100.00	39
Valid votes	14,882	98.34	
Invalid/blank votes	251	1.66	
Total votes	15,133	100.00	
Registered voters/turnout	26,590	56.91	

Incumbent mayor Hazbo Mujović of the Party of Democratic Action was confirmed for another term in office after the election.

Minela Kalender, the incumbent deputy mayor, was elected to the assembly from the third position on the Party of Democratic Action's list. She resigned on 30 May 2016 after being appointed as a member of the municipal council. Her term in the latter body appears to have been brief; she attended its inaugural meeting on 9 June 2016, but by September 2016 she was no longer listed as a member.

=== Southern and Eastern Serbia ===
==== Nišava District ====
Local elections were held for the City Assembly of Niš, the assemblies in all five of Niš's constituent municipalities, and the assemblies in all six of the Nišava District's other municipalities.

The Progressive Party and its allies won all of the elections in Niš. Outside the city, the results were mixed. The Progressives were successful in Aleksinac and Doljevac, and a coalition of the Progressives and United Peasant Party won in Svrljig. The Progressives also won the election in Merošina, although local divisions in the party led to an unstable governing alliance in the years that followed. The Socialists won Gadžin Han, and incumbent mayor Dobrica Stojković led New Serbia to a rare majority victory in Ražanj.

===== Niš =====
Results of the election for the City Assembly of Niš:

Party	Votes	%	Seats
Aleksandar Vučić–Serbia Is Winning (Serbian Progressive Party, Social Democratic Party of Serbia, Party of United Pensioners of Serbia, Movement of Socialists)	46,878	40.14	28
"Ivica Dačić–Socialist Party of Serbia (SPS), United Serbia (JS)"	13,577	11.62	8
"Niš, My City!–Democratic Party, SDS, NPS, LDP"	13,094	11.21	7
"Enough Is Enough–Saša Radulović"	9,905	8.48	5
Dr. Vojislav Šešelj–Serbian Radical Party	8,423	7.21	5
Dveri–Democratic Party of Serbia	6,615	5.66	4
Honestly for Niš, Momir Stojanović	6,136	5.25	3
United Opposition–With Our Hearts for Niš–Prof. Dr. Milan Višnjić (Reformist Party, Together for Serbia)	3,252	2.78	–
"Miša Jović–Serbian Left–Niš for All of Us"	2,273	1.95	–
New Party	2,266	1.94	–
Russian Party–Dr. Miroslav Milosavljević	1,788	1.53	1
United Russian Party–Dr. Bojan Stanojević	1,286	1.10	–
Serbian-Russian Movement	799	0.68	–
Roma Unity Party	507	0.43	–
Total	116,799	100.00	61
Valid votes	116,799	97.15	
Invalid/blank votes	3,431	2.85	
Total votes	120,230	100.00	
Registered voters/turnout	233,647	51.46	

Darko Bulatović of the Progressive Party was chosen as mayor following the election, with the support of forty-six delegates.

Momir Stojanović was elected from the lead position on the Honestly for Niš list. He was technically a member of the Serbian Progressive Party at the time of the election, but he resigned from the party later in the year.

====== Niš: Crveni Krst ======
Results of the election for the Municipal Assembly of Crveni Krst:

Party	Votes	%	Seats
Aleksandar Vučić–Serbia Is Winning (Serbian Progressive Party, Movement of Socialists, Party of United Pensioners of Serbia, United Peasant Party)	8,727	54.33	14
Niš, My City!–Democratic Party, SDS, NPS, LDP	1,585	9.87	2
Ivica Dačić–Socialist Party of Serbia (SPS), United Serbia (JS)	1,452	9.04	2
Dr. Vojislav Šešelj–Serbian Radical Party	1,438	8.95	2
Citizens' Groups (two different lists)	1,349	8.40	1
Dveri–Democratic Party of Serbia	707	4.40	–
Russian Party–Dr. Miroslav Milosavljević	317	1.97	–
United Opposition–With Our Hearts for Niš–Prof. Dr. Milan Višnjić (Reformist Party, Together for Serbia)	307	1.91	–
Roma Unity Party	182	1.13	–
Total	16,064	100.00	21
Valid votes	16,064	96.64	
Invalid/blank votes	559	3.36	
Total votes	16,623	100.00	
Registered voters/turnout	30,251	54.95	

Incumbent mayor Miroslav Milutinović of the Progressive Party was confirmed in office for another term, by a unanimous vote of the delegates present.

====== Niš: Medijana ======
Results of the election for the Municipal Assembly of Medijana:

Party	Votes	%	Seats
Aleksandar Vučić–Serbia Is Winning (Serbian Progressive Party, Party of United Pensioners of Serbia)	6,633	30.66	10
"Niš, My City!–Democratic Party, SDS, NPS, LDP"	3,869	17.88	6
"Enough Is Enough–Saša Radulović"	3,452	15.96	5
"Ivica Dačić–Socialist Party of Serbia (SPS), United Serbia (JS)"	2,242	10.36	3
Honestly for Niš, Momir Stojanović	1,590	7.35	2
Dveri–Democratic Party of Serbia	1,276	5.90	1
Dr. Vojislav Šešelj–Serbian Radical Party	871	4.03	–
New Party	486	2.25	–
United Opposition–With Our Hearts for Niš–Prof. Dr. Milan Višnjić (Reformist Party, Together for Serbia)	369	1.71	–
Russian Party–Dr. Miroslav Milosavljević	350	1.62	–
United Peasant Party–Milija Miletić	265	1.22	–
"Serbian Left–Medijana for All of Us"	232	1.07	–
Total	21,635	100.00	27
Valid votes	21,635	98.89	
Invalid/blank votes	243	1.11	
Total votes	21,878	100.00	
Registered voters/turnout	81,113	26.97	

Milan Krstić of the Progressive Party was chosen as mayor after the election. The government was formed by the Progressives, the Socialists, and the "Honestly for Niš" group. Krstić resigned in September 2017 and was replaced by Nebojša Kocić, who had previously left the Democratic Party to join the Progressives.

====== Niš: Niška Banja ======
Results of the election for the Municipal Assembly of Niška Banja:

Party	Votes	%	Seats
Aleksandar Vučić–Serbia Is Winning (Serbian Progressive Party, Social Democratic Party of Serbia)	2,572	34.60	8
Citizens' Groups (two different lists)	2,188	29.43	6
United Serbia–Dragan Marković Palma–Domaćinski	816	10.98	2
Coalition: He Is Fighting for Banja–NPS, SDS, LDP, Miloš Milenković	607	8.17	2
Ivica Dačić–Socialist Party of Serbia (SPS)	402	5.41	1
Dr. Vojislav Šešelj–Serbian Radical Party	362	4.87	–
Democratic Party	221	2.97	–
Serbian Left–Niška Banja for All of Us	149	2.00	–
United Opposition–With Our Hearts for Banja–Prof. Dr. Milan Višnjić (Reformist Party, Together for Serbia)	117	1.57	–
Total	7,434	100.00	19
Valid votes	7,434	95.80	
Invalid/blank votes	326	4.20	
Total votes	7,760	100.00	
Registered voters/turnout	12,576	61.70	

Dejan Jovanović of the Progressive Party was chosen as mayor after the election.

====== Niš: Palilula ======
Results of the election for the Municipal Assembly of Palilula, Niš:

Party	Votes	%	Seats
Aleksandar Vučić–Serbia Is Winning (Serbian Progressive Party, Party of United Pensioners of Serbia)	14,671	44.98	14
Niš, My City!–Democratic Party, SDS, NPS, LDP	4,239	13.00	4
Ivica Dačić–Socialist Party of Serbia (SPS), United Serbia (JS)	3,765	11.54	3
Dr. Vojislav Šešelj–Serbian Radical Party	2,653	8.13	2
Dveri–Democratic Party of Serbia	2,251	6.90	2
Honestly for Niš–Momir Stojanović	1,387	4.25	–
United Opposition–With Our Hearts for Niš–Prof. Dr. Milan Višnjić (Reformist Party, Together for Serbia)	1,024	3.14	–
New Party	988	3.03	–
Serbian Left–Palilula for All of Us	883	2.71	–
Russian Party–Dr. Miroslav Milosavljević	757	2.32	–
Total	32,618	100.00	25
Valid votes	32,618	96.94	
Invalid/blank votes	1,028	3.06	
Total votes	33,646	100.00	
Registered voters/turnout	65,705	51.21	

Aleksandar Ždrale of the Progressive Party was chosen as mayor after the election with the support of twenty-two delegates.

====== Niš: Pantelej ======
Results of the election for the Municipal Assembly of Pantelej:

Party	Votes	%	Seats
Aleksandar Vučić–Serbia Is Winning (Serbian Progressive Party, Party of United Pensioners of Serbia, Movement of Socialists, Social Democratic Party of Serbia, Serbian People's Party)	8,787	38.35	11
"Niš, My City!–Democratic Party, SDS, NPS, LDP"	2,418	10.55	3
"Ivica Dačić–Socialist Party of Serbia (SPS), United Serbia (JS)"	2,122	9.26	2
Honestly for Niš–General Momir Stojanović	1,865	8.14	2
"Slaviša Dinić–Serbian Left–Pantelej for All of Us"	1,633	7.13	–
Dr. Vojislav Šešelj Serbian Radical Party	1,631	7.12	2
Dveri–Democratic Party of Serbia	1,399	6.11	1
United Peasant Party–Milija Miletić	1,131	4.94	–
New Party	667	2.91	–
United Opposition–With Our Hearts for Niš–Prof. Dr. Milan Višnjić (Reformist Party, Together for Serbia)	607	2.65	–
Russian Party–Dr. Miroslav Milosavljević	496	2.16	–
Roma Unity Party	156	0.68	–
Total	22,912	100.00	21
Valid votes	22,912	96.39	
Invalid/blank votes	859	3.61	
Total votes	23,771	100.00	
Registered voters/turnout	44,002	54.02	

Bratimir Vasiljević of the Progressive Party was chosen as mayor after the election.

===== Aleksinac =====
Results of the election for the Municipal Assembly of Aleksinac:

Party	Votes	%	Seats
Aleksandar Vučić–Serbia Is Winning (Serbian Progressive Party, Social Democratic Party of Serbia, Party of United Pensioners of Serbia, Movement of Socialists, New Serbia, United Peasant Party, Serbian Renewal Movement, Strength of Serbia Movement)	9,607	39.92	24
Socialist Party of Serbia (SPS)–Ivica Dačić	4,375	18.18	11
United Serbia–Dragan Marković Palma	3,236	13.45	8
Responsibly for Aleksinac–Ivan Dimić (Democratic Party, Democratic Party of Serbia)	3,013	12.52	8
People's Movement–Grujica Veljković	1,251	5.20	3
Dr. Vojislav Šešelj–Serbian Radical Party	1,037	4.31	–
Alliance for a Better Aleksinac–Prof. Slavoljub Blagojević Blaško (Social Democratic Party, Liberal Democratic Party)	1,013	4.21	–
Party of Russians of Serbia	531	2.21	–
Total	24,063	100.00	54
Valid votes	24,063	96.60	
Invalid/blank votes	847	3.40	
Total votes	24,910	100.00	
Registered voters/turnout	43,034	57.88	

Incumbent mayor Nenad Stanković of the Progressive Party was confirmed for another term in office after the election.

===== Doljevac =====
Results of the election for the Municipal Assembly of Doljevac:

Party	Votes	%	Seats
Aleksandar Vučić–Serbia Is Winning (Serbian Progressive Party)	7,751	70.97	27
Coalition: Socialist Party of Serbia, United Serbia, Democratic Party of Serbia, Dveri	1,383	12.66	4
Coalition: Democratic Party, Social Democratic Party, Russian Party	1,228	11.24	4
Dr. Vojislav Šešelj–Serbian Radical Party	560	5.13	2
Total	10,922	100.00	37
Valid votes	10,922	97.63	
Invalid/blank votes	265	2.37	
Total votes	11,187	100.00	
Registered voters/turnout	14,920	74.98	

Incumbent mayor Goran Ljubić of the Progressive Party was confirmed for another term in office after the election.

===== Gadžin Han =====
Results of the election for the Municipal Assembly of Gadžin Han:

Party	Votes	%	Seats
Ivica Dačić–Socialist Party of Serbia (SPS)	2,123	40.35	16
United Serbia Dragan Marković Palma "Domaćinski za Zaplanje"	1,068	20.30	8
Aleksandar Vučić–Serbia Is Winning (Serbian Progressive Party, Party of United Pensioners of Serbia, United Peasant Party)	1,047	19.90	7
I Choose Zaplanje-Because I Live Here (Democratic Party, Together for Serbia, Serbian Renewal Movement)	325	6.18	2
Stanoje Stojanović Beja–For a Better Zaplanje	209	3.97	–
"Adrijana Grozdanović–Young Zaplanje"	190	3.61	–
SNP–Nenad Popović	155	2.95	–
Dr. Vojislav Šešelj–Serbian Radical Party	144	2.74	–
Total	5,261	100.00	33
Valid votes	5,261	96.46	
Invalid/blank votes	193	3.54	
Total votes	5,454	100.00	
Registered voters/turnout	7,126	76.54	

Incumbent mayor Saša Đorđević of the Socialist Party was confirmed for another term in office after the election, with the support of the Democratic Party. He stood down in March 2019 following a recalibration of political forces in the community; his replacement was Marija Cvetković, a former Socialist who had joined the Progressives.

===== Merošina =====
Results of the election for the Municipal Assembly of Merošina:

Party	Votes	%	Seats
Citizens' Groups (four different lists)	3,056	35.44	12
Aleksandar Vučić–Serbia Is Winning (Serbian Progressive Party, New Serbia)	1,848	21.43	10
Socialist Party of Serbia	1,050	12.18	5
United Serbia–Dragan Marković Palma	798	9.25	4
Merošina and the Village–Dipl Inž. Zoran Jović, Dipl. Inž. Vlastimir Mladenović." (Democratic Party of Serbia, United Peasant Party)	477	5.53	2
Democratic Party–Sanja Miladinović	474	5.50	2
Serbian Radical Party–Dr. Vojislav Šešelj	468	5.43	2
Party of United Pensioners of Serbia–Milan Krkobabić	273	3.17	–
Russian Party–Dinić Miroslav	104	1.21	–
Roma Unity Party–Selmanović Blagoje	76	0.88	–
Total	8,624	100.00	37
Valid votes	8,624	97.82	
Invalid/blank votes	192	2.18	
Total votes	8,816	100.00	
Registered voters/turnout	10,807	81.58	

There were several changes in the municipal administration of Merošina between 2016 and 2020, amid ongoing divisions in the ranks of the Serbian Progressive Party's local organization.

Sanja Stajić of the Progressives was chosen as mayor after the election. She was replaced by fellow Progressive Saša Jovanović in February 2018. The administration was reshuffled in May 2018, and Bojan Nešić was chosen as the municipality's new mayor – Nešić had been elected on the "Naprednjaci" list, which by this time had affiliated itself with the Socialist Party. The "Naprednjaci" group later merged into the Progressives. In September 2018, Nešić resigned as mayor and Jovanović returned to office. The municipal assembly was ultimately dissolved in August 2019, and Sanja Stajić was named as president of an interim administration that governed the municipality until new elections were held in 2020.

Future parliamentarian Sanja Miladinović was elected to the assembly from the lead position on the Democratic Party's list.

===== Ražanj =====
Results of the election for the Municipal Assembly of Ražanj:

Party	Votes	%	Seats
New Serbia–Dobrica Stojković	2,473	58.78	18
Citizens' Group: Verislav Velisavljević - Verče	513	12.19	3
Aleksandar Vučić–Serbia Is Winning (Serbian Progressive Party, Party of United Pensioners of Serbia)	398	9.46	2
Socialist Party of Serbia (SPS)–Ivica Dačić	367	8.72	2
For Staying and Survival, For the Village, For the Farmer, For the Beekeeper, For the Entrepreneur and the Homeowner, For All of Us Together–Democratic Party and Liberal Democratic Party	351	8.34	2
United Peasant Party–Milija Miletić	105	2.50	–
Total	4,207	100.00	27
Valid votes	4,207	96.12	
Invalid/blank votes	170	3.88	
Total votes	4,377	100.00	
Registered voters/turnout	7,037	62.20	

Incumbent mayor Dobrica Stojković of New Serbia was confirmed for another term in office after the election. He left the party later in the term.

===== Svrljig =====
Results of the election for the Municipal Assembly of Svrljig:

Party	Votes	%	Seats
United Peasant Party–Milija Miletić–Serbian Progressive Party–Responsibility and Sincerely for Youth, Peasants, Workers, and Pensioners	4,811	67.75	20
"Ivica Dačić–Socialist Party of Serbia (SPS), New Serbia (NS), People's Peasant Party (NSS)–Svrljig Is Winning"	858	12.08	3
Together for the Municipality of Svrljig–Democratic Party, Democratic Party of Serbia	475	6.69	2
United Serbia–Dragan Marković Palma–Domaćinski za Svrljig	456	6.42	1
Dr. Vojislav Šešelj–Serbian Radical Party	389	5.48	1
Green Party	112	1.58	–
Total	7,101	100.00	27
Valid votes	7,101	96.17	
Invalid/blank votes	283	3.83	
Total votes	7,384	100.00	
Registered voters/turnout	11,871	62.20	

Incumbent mayor Jelena Trifunović of the United Peasant Party was confirmed for another term in office after the election.

==== Pirot District ====
Local elections were held in the one city (Pirot) and the three other municipalities of the Pirot District.

In Pirot, an independent list led by incumbent mayor Vladan Vasić won a narrow victory over the Serbian Progressive Party's alliance and afterward formed a coalition government with smaller parties. The Progressives joined the government in 2017, and in early 2020 Vasić and his group collectively joined the Progressives.

In both Babušnica and Dimitrovgrad, the Progressive Party's alliance won plurality victories and became the dominant presence in the local government. In Bela Palanka, an incumbent mayor from the Social Democratic Party initially won the election, after which the results were annulled, the mayor in question joined the Progressives (taking the entire local Social Democratic Party board with him), and the Progressive alliance won a majority victory in the repeat election.

By 2020, the Progressives dominated the local governments of all four jurisdictions in the district.

===== Pirot =====
Results of the election for the City Assembly of Pirot:

Party	Votes	%	Seats
Citizens' Group: Vladan Vasić–Coalition for Pirot	10,562	37.17	23
Aleksandar Vučić–Serbia Is Winning (Serbian Progressive Party, United Peasant Party, Movement of Socialists, Party of United Pensioners of Serbia, Movement for Serbia)	9,681	34.07	21
Ivica Dačić–Socialist Party of Serbia	2,722	9.58	5
Citizens' Group: New Force of Pirot–Dimitrije Vidanović–Dušan Mitić	1,891	6.65	4
Prof. Vladica Tošić–Victory for All–SDS–LDP	1,614	5.68	3
Dr. Vojislav Šešelj–Serbian Radical Party	1,149	4.04	–
For a Just Serbia–Democratic Party–Reformist Party–Together for Serbia	537	1.89	–
Republican Party–Damir Stanijev	263	0.93	–
Total	28,419	100.00	56
Valid votes	28,419	96.46	
Invalid/blank votes	1,044	3.54	
Total votes	29,463	100.00	
Registered voters/turnout	49,126	59.97	

Incumbent mayor Vladan Vasić of the Coalition for Pirot was confirmed for another term in office after the election, leading a coalition government that also included the Socialist Party of Serbia and the Social Democratic Party. In July 2017, the Serbian Progressive Party joined the governing coalition. In February 2020, Vasić and the Coalition for Pirot collectively joined the Progressives.

===== Babušnica =====
Results of the election for the Municipal Assembly of Babušnica:

Party	Votes	%	Seats
Aleksandar Vučić–Serbia Is Winning (Serbian Progressive Party, Serbian Renewal Movement)	2,016	27.98	8
Ivica Dačić–Socialist Party of Serbia (SPS)	1,344	18.65	5
Mr. Milan Singer, Dr. Slave NS, Dr. Zvonko PS, Democratic Party of Bulgarians	1,090	15.13	4
Social Democratic Party of Serbia and Nikolić Dr. Mile	720	9.99	2
Voice for Salvation–Saša Stanković–Democratic Party–Political Party Active Serbia	535	7.42	2
Social Democratic Party–Vladimir Veljković	420	5.83	1
United Serbia–Dragan Božilović	355	4.93	–
Russian Party	350	4.86	1
Dr. Vojislav Šešelj–Serbian Radical Party	207	2.87	–
United Peasant Party	169	2.35	–
Total	7,206	100.00	23
Valid votes	7,206	95.93	
Invalid/blank votes	306	4.07	
Total votes	7,512	100.00	
Registered voters/turnout	10,192	73.70	

Dragan Vidanović from the Serbian Progressive Party was chosen as mayor after the election, leading a coalition government that also included the Socialist Party of Serbia and the Serbian Renewal Movement. Vidanović resigned in December 2017, citing health concerns, and was replaced by Slađana Nikolić, also of the Progressives.

===== Bela Palanka =====
The initial results of the election in Bela Palanka showed the Social Democratic Party winning fourteen seats, the Serbian Progressive Party seven, the Socialist Party of Serbia five, and United Serbia two, with one seat going to a citizens' group. These elections were annulled in early May 2016 on the grounds of multiple irregularities. Shortly after the elections were annulled, the entire local board of the Social Democratic Party, led by incumbent mayor Goran Miljković, joined the Progressives. In July 2016, Miljković joined was appointed as leader of a provisional administration pending a new vote.

A new vote took place on 18 September 2016 and was boycotted by most opposition parties. The results were as follows:

Party	Votes	%	Seats
Serbian Progressive Party–Aleksandar Vučić	5,781	76.03	24
Ivica Dačić–Socialist Party of Serbia–United Serbia	1,170	15.39	5
Dr. Vojislav Šešelj–Serbian Radical Party	358	4.71	–
PUPS–Milan Krkobabić	241	3.17	–
Citizens' Groups (two different lists)	54	0.71	–
Total	7,604	100.00	29
Valid votes	7,604	97.30	
Invalid/blank votes	211	2.70	
Total votes	7,815	100.00	
Registered voters/turnout	9,631	81.14	

Goran Miljković was confirmed for a new term as mayor on 29 September 2016.

===== Dimitrovgrad =====
Results of the election for the Municipal Assembly of Dimitrovgrad:

Party	Votes	%	Seats
Aleksandar Vučić–Serbia Is Winning (Serbian Progressive Party)	2,904	46.11	14
Nebojša Ivanov–Caribrod for Everyone–Democratic Party of Bulgarians	1,196	18.99	6
Coalition: Zoran Petrov (Together for Our City), DS	880	13.97	4
Ivica Dačić–Socialist Party of Serbia (SPS)	404	6.41	2
Knowledge, Youth and Experience–Movement of Socialists–United Serbia	398	6.32	2
Citizens' Group: Caribrode, Think Freely!	340	5.40	1
Dr. Vojislav Šešelj–Serbian Radical Party	176	2.79	–
Total	6,298	100.00	29
Valid votes	6,298	95.70	
Invalid/blank votes	283	4.30	
Total votes	6,581	100.00	
Registered voters/turnout	8,770	75.04	

Vladica Dimitrov of the Serbian Progressive Party was chosen as mayor after the election, leading a coalition government with the Socialist Party of Serbia that was also supported by the Movement of Socialists.

==== Podunavlje District ====
Local elections were held in the one city (Smederevo) and the two other municipalities of the Podunavlje District. The Serbian Progressive Party and its allies won majority victories in all three jurisdictions.

===== Smederevo =====
Results of the election for the City Assembly of Smederevo:

Party	Votes	%	Seats
Aleksandar Vučić–Serbia Is Winning (Serbian Progressive Party, Party of United Pensioners of Serbia, Social Democratic Party of Serbia, New Serbia, Serbian Renewal Movement)	23,475	49.07	44
Ivica Dačić–Socialist Party of Serbia (SPS)	4,832	10.10	9
Democratic Party–Andreja Pavlović	4,349	9.09	8
Citizens' Group: "Enough Is Enough–Saša Radulović"	2,800	5.85	5
Dveri–Democratic Party of Serbia–Dr. Igor Švonja	2,569	5.37	4
Dr. Vojislav Šešelj–Serbian Radical Party	2,394	5.00	–
Milan Lukić–United Serbia	1,810	3.78	–
Social Democratic Party–Boris Tadić	1,263	2.64	–
Serbian People's Party–Nataša Marković	1,245	2.60	–
Smederevo Without Corruption Zoran Jokić	1,037	2.17	–
United Russian Party–Dr. Radiša Mijailović	1,013	2.12	–
Movement of Socialists–Branko Milanović	552	1.15	–
Republican Party–Ivan Petrović	500	1.05	–
Total	47,839	100.00	70
Valid votes	47,839	96.75	
Invalid/blank votes	1,606	3.25	
Total votes	49,445	100.00	
Registered voters/turnout	97,859	50.53	

Incumbent mayor Jasna Avramović of the Serbian Progressive Party was confirmed for another term in office after the election.

===== Smederevska Palanka =====
Results of the election for the Municipal Assembly of Smederevska Palanka:

Party	Votes	%	Seats
Aleksandar Vučić–Serbia Is Winning (Serbian Progressive Party, Party of United Pensioners of Serbia, Movement of Socialists, Third Serbia)	11,091	45.80	27
Democratic Party–Dr. Snežana Pavićević	4,768	19.69	12
Ivica Dačić–"Socialist Party of Serbia (SPS), United Serbia (JS)–Dragan Marković Palma, New Serbia (NS)"	2,840	11.73	7
Serbian Renewal Movement, Democratic Party of Serbia–Dobrica Jozić, Zlatan Bećić	1,264	5.22	3
Serbian Movement Dveri–Dušan Terzić	1,169	4.83	–
Citizens' Group: Movement 'Five to Twelve–Fatherland' Smederevska Palanka	869	3.59	–
Dr. Vojislav Šešelj–Serbian Radical Party	615	2.54	–
Citizens' Group: Vladimir Arsić–Youth Government	581	2.40	–
Boris Tadić–Social Democratic Party	488	2.02	–
Liberal Democratic Party–Goran Dugić	330	1.36	–
Serbian-Russian Movement–Slobodan Dimitrijević	203	0.84	–
Total	24,218	100.00	49
Valid votes	24,218	96.93	
Invalid/blank votes	768	3.07	
Total votes	24,986	100.00	
Registered voters/turnout	43,057	58.03	

Petar Milić of the Serbian Progressive Party was chosen as mayor after the election. The local Progressive organization subsequently experienced serious internal divisions, and in December 2016 a new coalition government was formed with Toplica Pintorović, also of the Progressives, chosen as mayor. These divisions ultimately prevented the functioning of the local government, and in October 2017 the municipal assembly was dissolved. Nikola Vučen of the Progressives was chosen as leader of a provisional government, pending new elections in 2018.

===== Velika Plana =====
Results of the election for the Municipal Assembly of Velika Plana:

Party	Votes	%	Seats
Aleksandar Vučić–Serbia Is Winning (Serbian Progressive Party)	9,181	48.38	22
Our Municipality in 1st Place–Dejan B. Šulkić–DSS–PSS–SPO	3,241	17.08	7
Ivica Dačić–Socialist Party of Serbia (SPS) United Serbia (JS) Dragan Marković Palma	2,442	12.87	5
Citizens' Group: For Our City and Our Villages	1,368	7.21	3
Democratic Party–Dr. Snežana Milojević	987	5.20	2
Dr. Vojislav Šešelj–Serbian Radical Party	914	4.82	–
Citizens' Group: Victory	486	2.56	–
Russian Party	358	1.89	–
Total	18,977	100.00	39
Valid votes	18,977	96.82	
Invalid/blank votes	624	3.18	
Total votes	19,601	100.00	
Registered voters/turnout	19,601	100.00	

Incumbent mayor Igor Matković of the Serbian Progressive Party was confirmed for another term in office after the election.

Former mayor Dejan Šulkić of the Democratic Party of Serbia led the Our Municipality in the First Place list and was re-elected to the assembly.
