= List of members of the National Assembly of Serbia, 2014–2016 =

== MNAs by party ==
Name	Abbr.	Leader	Ideology	Political position	MPs	Gov′t
Serbian Progressive Party; Српска напредна странка Srpska napredna stranka	SNS	Aleksandar Vučić	Conservatism; Populism	Centre-right	128 / 250	G
Socialist Party of Serbia; Социјалистичка партија Србије; Socjalistička partija Srbje	SPS	Ivica Dačić	Left-wing nationalism Left-wing populism	Centre-left	25 / 250	G
Democratic Party; Демократска странка Demokratska stranka	DS	Bojan Pajtić	Social democracy Social liberalism	Centre to centre-left	17 / 250	O
Party of United Pensioners of Serbia; Партија уједињених пензионера Србије; Partija ujedinjenih penzionera Srbije	PUPS	Jovan Krkobabić	Pensioners' interests Pro-Europeanism	Single-issue	12 / 250	S
Social Democratic Party of Serbia; Социјалдемократска партија Србије; Socijaldemokratska partija Srbije	SDPS	Rasim Ljajić	Social democracy Pro-Europeanism	Centre-left	10 / 250	G
Social Democratic Party; Социјалдемократска странка Socijaldemokratska stranka	SDS	Boris Tadić	Social democracy Atlanticism	Centre-left	9 / 250	O
United Serbia; Јединствена Србија; Jedinstvena Srbija	JS	Dragan Marković	Serbian nationalism National conservatism	Right-wing	7 / 250	S
League of Social Democrats of Vojvodina; Лига социјалдемократа Војводине; Liga socijaldemokrata Vojvodine	LSV	Nenad Čanak	Social democracy Regionalism	Centre-left	6 / 250	O
New Serbia; Нова Србија; Nova Srbija	NS	Velimir Ilić	Right-wing populism Monarchism	Right-wing	6 / 250	G
Alliance of Vojvodina Hungarians; Савез војвођанских Мађара; Savez vojvođanskih Mađara	SVM	István Pásztor	Hungarian minority politics Conservatism	Centre-right	6 / 250	S
Serbian Renewal Movement; Српски покрет обнове Srpski pokret obnove	SPO	Vuk Drašković	Monarchism; Atlanticism	Centre-right	5 / 250	S
Movement of Socialists; Покрет социјалиста Pokret socijalista	PS	Aleksandar Vulin	Left-wing nationalism Euroscepticism	Left-wing	3 / 250	G
Party of Democratic Action of Sandžak; Странка демократске акције Санџака; Stranka demokratske akcije Sandžaka	SDA	Sulejman Ugljanin	Bosniak minority politics Autonomism	Centre-right to right-wing	3 / 250	O
Together for Serbia; Заједно за Србију; Zajedno za Srbiju	ZZS	Dušan Petrović	Social democracy Progressivism	Centre-left	2 / 250	O
New Party; Нова странка Nova stranka	NOVA	Zoran Živković	Liberalism; Pro-Europeanism	Centre	2 / 250	O
Strength of Serbia Movement; Покрет снага Србије; Pokret snaga Srbije	PSS	Milanka Karić	Conservatism; Pro-Europeanism	Centre-right	2 / 250	S
Party for Democratic Action; Партија за демократско деловање Partija za demokratsko delovanje	PDD	Riza Halimi	Albanian minority politics Regionalism	Right-wing	2 / 250	O
Christian Democratic Party of Serbia; Демохришћанска странка Србије; Demohrišćanska stranka Srbije	DHSS	Olgica Batić	Christian democracy Atlanticism	Centre to centre-right	1 / 250	S
Greens of Serbia; Зелени Србије; Zeleni Srbije	ZS	Ivan Karić	Green politics Pro-Europeanism	Centre-left	1 / 250	O

This is a list of the 250 members of the 2014–2016 National Assembly of Serbia, as well as a list of former members of this convocation of the assembly.

The 2012–2014 National Assembly was elected in the 2014 parliamentary election, and it first met on April 16, 2014. The 2014–2016 National Assembly was the tenth assembly since the reestablishment of the multi-party system, after the 1990 parliamentary election.

== List of members of the 10th National Assembly at its dissolution ==
Name	Political Party	Place of living	Year of birth
Dragan Aleksić	Serbian Progressive Party	Osečina	1963
Irena Aleksić	Serbian Progressive Party	Kraljevo	1978
Adriana Anastasov	Serbian Progressive Party	Niš	1985
Mirjana Andrić	Serbian Progressive Party	Belgrade	1959
Zoran Antić	Serbian Progressive Party	Jagodina	1962
Konstantin Arsenović; Vice-President of the National Assembly	Party of United Pensioners of Serbia	Belgrade, New Belgrade	1940
Veroljub Arsić; Vice-President of the National Assembly	Serbian Progressive Party	Požarevac	1969
Marko Atlagić	Serbian Progressive Party	Belgrade	1949
Vlado Babić	Serbian Progressive Party	Sombor	1960
Zoran Babić	Serbian Progressive Party	Vrnjačka Banja	1971
Dušan Bajatović	Socialist Party of Serbia	Novi Sad	1967
Grozdana Banac	Party of United Pensioners of Serbia	Belgrade, Voždovac	1951
Dragana Barišić	Serbian Progressive Party	Kruševac	1975
Olgica Batić	Christian Democratic Party of Serbia	Belgrade, Obrenovac	1981
Ivan Bauer	Social Democratic Party of Serbia	Belgrade, Stari Grad	1967
Muamer Bačevac	Social Democratic Party of Serbia	Novi Pazar	1977
Nebojša Berić	Serbian Progressive Party	Sombor	1972
Ljiljana Beronja	Serbian Progressive Party	Kula	1959
Vesna Besarović	Social Democratic Party of Serbia	Belgrade, Vračar	1946
Igor Bečić; Vice-President of the National Assembly	Serbian Progressive Party	Vrbas	1971
Boban Birmančević	Serbian Progressive Party	Šabac	1969
Milena Bićanin	Social Democratic Party of Serbia	Surčin	1964
Branislav Blažić	Serbian Progressive Party	Belgrade	1957
Žarko Bogatinović	Serbian Progressive Party	Leskovac	1964
Goran Bogdanović	Social Democratic Party	Leposavić	1963
Balša Božović	Democratic Party	Belgrade, Stari Grad	1983
Zoran Bojanić	Serbian Progressive Party	Kraljevo	1959
Branka Bošnjak	Social Democratic Party of Serbia	Belgrade, Voždovac	1956
Blagoje Bradić	Together for Serbia	Niš	1955
Laslo Varga	Alliance of Vojvodina Hungarians	Palić	1976
Bratimir Vasiljević	Serbian Progressive Party	Niš	1953
Slobodan Veličković	Party of United Pensioners of Serbia	Belgrade	1947
Jelisaveta Veljković	Party of United Pensioners of Serbia	Sremski Karlovci	1951
Janko Veselinović	Movement for Reversal	Novi Sad	1965
Annamária Vicsek	Alliance of Vojvodina Hungarians	Novi Sad	1973
Sonja Vlahović	Serbian Progressive Party	Belgrade, New Belgrade	1969
Vojislav Vujić	United Serbia	Vrnjačka Banja	1975
Goran Vukadinović	Serbian Progressive Party	Leskovac	1965
Vanja Vukić	Socialist Party of Serbia	Belgrade	1978
Svetislav Vukmirica	Serbian Progressive Party	Kikinda	1972
Dijana Vukomanović	Socialist Party of Serbia	Belgrade	1967
Jezdimir Vučetić	Serbian Progressive Party	Loznica	1947
Nataša Vučković	Democratic Party	Belgrade, Savski Venac	1967
Slobodan Gvozdenović	Serbian Progressive Party	Valjevo	1965
Ninoslav Girić	Serbian Progressive Party	Leskovac	1955
Žika Gojković	Serbian Renewal Movement	Sombor	1972
Maja Gojković; President of the National Assembly	Serbian Progressive Party	Novi Sad	1963
Mladen Grujić	New Serbia	Belgrade, Vračar	1966
Sabina Dazdarević	Party of Democratic Action of Sandžak	Tutin	1982
Vladica Dimitrov	Serbian Progressive Party	Dimitrovgrad	1974
Ivana Dinić	Socialist Party of Serbia	Niš, Medijana	1985
Mirjana Dragaš	Socialist Party of Serbia	Belgrade, Zemun	1950
Srđan Dragojević	Socialist Party of Serbia	Belgrade	1963
Milovan Drecun	Serbian Progressive Party	Belgrade	1957
Zlata Đerić	New Serbia	Sombor	1958
Mirjana Đoković	Serbian Progressive Party	Čačak	1966
Vladimir Đukanović	Serbian Progressive Party	Belgrade	1979
Slavica Đukić Dejanović	Socialist Party of Serbia	Kragujevac	1951
Milan Đurica	Serbian Progressive Party	Belgrade, New Belgrade	1967
Živan Đurišić	Serbian Progressive Party	Velika Plana	1947
Marko Đurišić	Social Democratic Party	Belgrade	1968
Aleksandra Đurović	Serbian Progressive Party	Belgrade	1976
Branko Đurović	Social Democratic Party of Serbia	Belgrade, New Belgrade	1957
Zoran Živković	New Party	Belgrade, Vračar	1960
Milinko Živković	Serbian Progressive Party	Bor	1960
Dragoljub Zindović	Serbian Progressive Party	Prijepolje	1965
Gordana Zorić	Serbian Progressive Party	Kovin	1954
Biljana Ilić Stošić	Serbian Progressive Party	Kragujevac	1964
Enis Imamović	Party of Democratic Action of Sandžak	Novi Pazar	1984
Obrad Isailović	Serbian Progressive Party	Belgrade, Obrenovac	1950
Branka Janković	Serbian Progressive Party	Sremski Karlovci	1964
Dušan Janković	Serbian Progressive Party	Irig	1954
Marija Jevđić	United Serbia	Kraljevo	1981
Ivica Jevtić	Serbian Progressive Party	Smederevo	1960
Jovica Jevtić	Serbian Progressive Party	Raška	1975
Milanka Jevtović Vukojičić	Serbian Progressive Party	Priboj	1960
Aleksandra Jerkov	Democratic Party	Novi Sad	1982
Dragan Jovanović	New Serbia	Topola	1972
Ivan Jovanović	Democratic Party	Kraljevo	1977
Jovana Jovanović	Democratic Party	Kragujevac	1988
Neđo Jovanović	Socialist Party of Serbia	Užice	1962
Radoslav Jović	Serbian Progressive Party	Kraljevo	1957
Aleksandar Jovičić	Serbian Progressive Party	Belgrade	1987
Zoran Jozić	Serbian Progressive Party	Blace	1969
Nikola Jolović	Serbian Progressive Party	Novi Pazar	1977
Aleksandar Jugović	Serbian Renewal Movement	Čačak	1975
Šaip Kamberi	Party for Democratic Action	Bujanovac	1964
Branka Karavidić	Social Democratic Party	Majdanpek	1958
Dragomir Karić	Strength of Serbia Movement	Belgrade	1949
Ivan Karić	Greens of Serbia	Belgrade, Obrenovac	1975
Milanka Karić	Strength of Serbia Movement	Belgrade	1957
Milan Knežević	Serbian Progressive Party	Kragujevac	1952
Elvira Kovács	Alliance of Vojvodina Hungarians	Zrenjanin	1982
Borisav Kovačević	Party of United Pensioners of Serbia	Belgrade, Zemun	1943
Goran Kovačević	Serbian Progressive Party	Kragujevac	1970
Dejan Kovačević	Serbian Progressive Party	Gornji Milanovac	1979
Milan Kovačević	Serbian Progressive Party	Sremska Mitrovica	1962
Đorđe Kosanić	United Serbia	Kragujevac	1967
Ljiljana Kosorić	Serbian Renewal Movement	Kosjerić	1957
Radmilo Kostić	Serbian Progressive Party	Pirot	1971
Bojan Kostreš	League of Social Democrats of Vojvodina	Zrenjanin	1974
Milan Krkobabić	Party of United Pensioners of Serbia	Belgrade, New Belgrade	1952
Mirko Krlić	Serbian Progressive Party	Zrenjanin	1955
Srđan Kružević	United Serbia	Novi Sad	1977
Nada Lazić	League of Social Democrats of Vojvodina	Novi Sad	1950
Ljibuška Lakatoš	Serbian Progressive Party	Stara Pazova	1972
Darko Laketić	Serbian Progressive Party	Prokuplje	1975
Milan Latković	Socialist Party of Serbia	Ruma, Vitojevci	1949
Miodrag Linta	Coalition of Refugee Associations in the Republic of Serbia	Belgrade	1969
Mladen Lukić	Serbian Progressive Party	Bajina Bašta	1977
Violeta Lutovac	Serbian Progressive Party	Varvarin	1986
Saša Maksimović	Serbian Progressive Party	Novi Bečej	1976
Siniša Maksimović	Socialist Party of Serbia	Kruševac	1959
Aleksandra Maletić	Serbian Progressive Party	Novi Sad	1982
Ljiljana Malušić	Serbian Progressive Party	Belgrade, Voždovac	1958
Marjana Maraš	Socialist Party of Serbia	Vrbas, Ravno Selo	1970
Vladimir Marinković; Vice-President of the National Assembly	Social Democratic Party of Serbia	Belgrade, Voždovac	1976
Gorjana Marinković	Movement of Socialists	Stara Pazova	1990
Miroslav Marinković	Social Democratic Party	Svilajnac	1961
Vesna Marjanović	Democratic Party	Belgrade, Palilula	1969
Mirjana Marjanović	Serbian Progressive Party	Surčin, Boljevci	1979
Miroslav Markićević	New Serbia	Čačak	1958
Aleksandar Marković	Serbian Progressive Party	Belgrade	1981
Vesna Marković	Serbian Progressive Party	Belgrade, Zemun	1974
Dragan Marković Palma	United Serbia	Jagodina, Končarevo	1960
Jovan Marković	Democratic Party	Užice	1972
Aleksandar Martinović	Serbian Progressive Party	Ruma	1976
Vesna Martinović	Democratic Party	Pančevo	1970
Veroljub Matić	Serbian Progressive Party	Koceljeva	1953
Jelena Mijatović	Serbian Progressive Party	Belgrade, Palilula	1977
Milorad Mijatović	Social Democratic Party of Serbia	Novi Sad	1947
Predrag Mijatović	Serbian Progressive Party	Vršac	1950
Stefana Miladinović	Socialist Party of Serbia	Belgrade, Rakovica	1981
Zoran Milekić	Serbian Progressive Party	Kučevo	1955
Milija Miletić	United Peasant Party	Svrljig	1968
Dušan Milisavljević	Democratic Party	Niš, Medijana	1968
Đorđe Milićević	Socialist Party of Serbia	Valjevo	1978
Milosav Milojević	Serbian Progressive Party	Aranđelovac	1954
Nenad Milosavljević	Socialist Party of Serbia	Belgrade, Stari Grad	1954
Vladan Milošević	Serbian Progressive Party	Vladimirci	1962
Nevenka Milošević	Serbian Progressive Party	Ivanjica	1966
Saša Mirković	Independent	Zaječar	1972
Nenad Mitrović	Serbian Progressive Party	Bujanovac	1973
Žarko Mićin	Serbian Progressive Party	Novi Sad	1982
Dragoljub Mićunović	Democratic Party	Belgrade, New Belgrade	1930
Miletić Mihajlović	Socialist Party of Serbia	Petrovac	1951
Goran Mladenović	Serbian Progressive Party	Vladičin Han	1979
Ljubica Mrdaković Todorović	Serbian Progressive Party	Niš	1962
Milutin Mrkonjić	Socialist Party of Serbia	Belgrade	1942
Mujo Muković	Bosniak People's Party	Tutin	1963
Dejan Nektarijević	Serbian Progressive Party	Smederevska Palanka	1961
Ljiljana Nestorović	Social Democratic Party of Serbia	Belgrade, Voždovac	1968
Dejan Nikolić	Democratic Party	Sokobanja	1979
Dragan Nikolić	Serbian Progressive Party	Vranje	1960
Dušica Nikolić	Serbian Progressive Party	Belgrade	1962
Miljana Nikolić	Serbian Progressive Party	Kosovska Mitrovica	1971
Miodrag Nikolić	Economic Renewal of Serbia	Jagodina	1950
Nenad Nikolić	Serbian Progressive Party	Belgrade	1987
Sanja Nikolić	Serbian Progressive Party	Belgrade, Zvezdara	1980
Nadica Nikolić Tanasijević	Serbian Progressive Party	Grocka	1970
Milan Novaković	Serbian Progressive Party	Novi Sad	1963
Žarko Obradović	Socialist Party of Serbia	Belgrade, Vračar	1960
Jasmina Obradović	Serbian Progressive Party	Novi Sad	1961
Marija Obradović	Serbian Progressive Party	Belgrade	1974
Meho Omerović	Social Democratic Party of Serbia	Belgrade, Palilula	1959
Vladimir Orlić	Serbian Progressive Party	Belgrade, Čukarica	1983
Vladimir Pavićević	New Party	Belgrade, Zvezdara	1978
Aleksandar Pajović	Serbian Progressive Party	Lučani	1958
Krstimir Pantić	Serbian Progressive Party	Lazarevac	1972
Biljana Pantić Pilja	Serbian Progressive Party	Novi Sad	1983
Olena Papuga	League of Social Democrats of Vojvodina	Kula	1964
Balint Pastor	Alliance of Vojvodina Hungarians	Subotica	1979
Olivera Pauljeskić	Serbian Progressive Party	Žagubica	1971
Vera Paunović	Party of United Pensioners of Serbia	Belgrade, Lazarevac	1947
Dragan Paunović	Serbian Progressive Party	Veliko Gradište	1959
Zoltan Pek	Alliance of Vojvodina Hungarians	Senta	1962
Aleksandar Peranović	Serbian Progressive Party	Šabac	1976
Slobodan Perić	Serbian Progressive Party	Petrovac	1964
Vladimir Petković	Serbian Progressive Party	Barajevo	1979
Milan Petrić	Serbian People's Party	Belgrade, Zvezdara	1976
Dušan Petrović	Together for Serbia	Šabac	1966
Mira Petrović	Party of United Pensioners of Serbia	Belgrade, New Belgrade	1956
Nebojša Petrović	Movement of Socialists	Belgrade	1961
Petar Petrović	United Serbia	Jagodina	1951
Milisav Petronijević	Socialist Party of Serbia	Belgrade, Savski Venac	1949
Olivera Pešić	Serbian Progressive Party	Leskovac	1979
Dragan Polovina	Serbian Progressive Party	Belgrade, Stari Grad	1953
Mileta Poskurica	Serbian Progressive Party	Kragujevac	1954
Zoran Pralica	Association of Small and Medium Businesses and Entrepreneurs of Serbia	Belgrade	1967
Jelisaveta Pribojac	Serbian Progressive Party	Kraljevo	1956
Dejan Radenković	Socialist Party of Serbia	Priština	1971
Dalibor Radičević	Serbian Progressive Party	Aleksinac	1976
Aleksandar Radojević	Independent	Čačak	1965
Katarina Rakić	Serbian Progressive Party	Grocka	1979
Vesna Rakonjac	Serbian Progressive Party	Kruševac	1967
Branimir Rančić	Serbian Progressive Party	Niš	1953
Marijan Rističević	People's Peasant Party	Inđija	1958
Branko Ružić	Socialist Party of Serbia	Belgrade, Čukarica	1975
Biljana Savović	Serbian Progressive Party	Sečanj	1960
Aleksandar Senić	Social Democratic Party	Rača	1978
Vesna Simić	Serbian Progressive Party	Knjaževac	1966
Suzana Spasojević	Socialist Party of Serbia	Smederevo	1970
Miroljub Stanković	Party of United Pensioners of Serbia	Niš	1946
Velimir Stanojević	New Serbia	Čačak	1964
Milan Stevanović	Serbian Progressive Party	Belgrade	1958
Zvonimir Stević	Socialist Party of Serbia	Priština, Badovac	1957
Borislav Stefanović	Serbian Left	Novi Sad	1974
Ninoslav Stojadinović; Vice-President of the National Assembly	Social Democratic Party	Niš	1950
Momir Stojanović	Independent	Niš	1958
Nevena Stojanović	United Serbia	Belgrade, Mladenovac	1986
Ivana Stojiljković	Serbian Progressive Party	Užice	1981
Velibor Stojković	Serbian Progressive Party	Vlasotince	1966
Dušica Stojković	Serbian Progressive Party	Belgrade	1979
Ljubiša Stojmirović	Serbian Progressive Party	Belgrade	1950
Đorđe Stojšić	League of Social Democrats of Vojvodina	Sremska Mitrovica	1977
Milorad Stošić	Party of United Pensioners of Serbia	Niš	1954
Dušan Stupar	Serbian Progressive Party	Belgrade	1956
Željko Sušec	Serbian Progressive Party	Pančevo	1977
Nebojša Tatomir	Serbian Progressive Party	Jagodina	1968
Dragan Todorović	Movement of Socialists	Pirot	1969
Tanja Tomašević Damnjanović	Serbian Progressive Party	Vršac	1982
Aleksandra Tomić	Serbian Progressive Party	Belgrade	1969
Novica Tončev	Socialist Party of Serbia	Surdulica, Božica	1962
Gordana Topić	Socialist Party of Serbia	Pančevo, Banatsko Novo Selo	1971
Miloš Tošanić	Serbian Progressive Party	Lazarevac	1964
Velinka Tošić	Serbian Progressive Party	Loznica	1963
Vučeta Tošković	Serbian Progressive Party	Novi Sad	1941
Milena Turk	Serbian Progressive Party	Trstenik	1986
Goran Ćirić	Democratic Party	Niš	1960
Milena Ćorilić	Party of United Pensioners of Serbia	Šabac	1944
Aida Ćorović	Democratic Party	Novi Pazar	1961
Sulejman Ugljanin	Party of Democratic Action of Sandžak	Novi Pazar	1953
Ana Filipović	Serbian Progressive Party	Kragujevac	1980
Dubravka Filipovski	New Serbia	Belgrade	1967
Arpad Fremond	Alliance of Vojvodina Hungarians	Pačir	1981
Riza Halimi	Party for Democratic Action	Preševo	1947
Biljana Hasanović-Korać	Social Democratic Party	Vršac	1955
Slobodan Homen	Social Democratic Party	Belgrade	1972
Milorad Cvetanović	Serbian Progressive Party	Belgrade, Mladenovac	1941
Đorđe Čabarkapa	Socialist Party of Serbia	Belgrade, Rakovica	1980
Nenad Čanak	League of Social Democrats of Vojvodina	Novi Sad	1959
Dejan Čapo	League of Social Democrats of Vojvodina	Zrenjanin	1978
Mirko Čikiriz	Serbian Renewal Movement	Kragujevac	1963
Momo Čolaković	Party of United Pensioners of Serbia	Novi Sad	1940
Gordana Čomić; Vice-President of the National Assembly	Democratic Party	Novi Sad	1958
Aleksandar Čotrić	Serbian Renewal Movement	Belgrade, Stari Grad	1966
Suzana Šarac	Serbian Progressive Party	Belgrade	1981
Dragan Šormaz	Serbian Progressive Party	Smederevo	1967
Dragan Šutanovac	Democratic Party	Belgrade, Zvezdara	1968
Katarina Šušnjar	Serbian Progressive Party	Surčin	1990

== List of former members of the 10th National Assembly ==
Name	Political Party	Term of Office	Year of birth
Dejan Andrejević	Serbian Progressive Party	16 April 2014 – 12 September 2014	1971
Aleksandar Antić	Socialist Party of Serbia	16 April 2014 – 27 April 2014	1969
Snežana Bogosavljević Bošković	Socialist Party of Serbia	16 April 2014 – 27 April 2014	1964
Irena Vujović	Serbian Progressive Party	16 April 2014 – 8 May 2014	1983
Aleksandar Vulin	Movement of Socialists	16 April 2014 – 27 April 2014	1972
Aleksandar Vučić	Serbian Progressive Party	16 April 2014 – 17 April 2014	1970
Ivica Dačić	Socialist Party of Serbia	16 April 2014 – 27 April 2014	1966
Dragan Đilas	Democratic Party	16 April 2014 – 13 October 2014	1967
Miljana Zindović	Socialist Party of Serbia	16 April 2014 – 29 July 2014	1981
Bojan Zirić	Serbian Progressive Party	16 April 2014 – 27 October 2014	1983
Aleksandar Jablanović	Movement of Socialists	16 April 2014 – 12 December 2014	1980
Dražen Jarić	Serbian Progressive Party	16 April 2014 – 15 September 2014	1978
Jadranka Joksimović	Serbian Progressive Party	16 April 2014 – 27 April 2014	1978
Goran Knežević	Serbian Progressive Party	16 April 2014 – 28 April 2014	1957
Milan Korać	Party of United Pensioners of Serbia	16 April 2014 – 24 December 2015	1929
Vladeta Kostić	Serbian Progressive Party	16 April 2014 – 26 December 2014	1972
Jovan Krkobabić	Party of United Pensioners of Serbia	16 April 2014 – 22 April 2014	1930
Jana Ljubičić	Serbian Progressive Party	16 April 2014 – 23 April 2014	1978
Snežana Malović	Social Democratic Party	16 April 2014 – 6 October 2015	1976
Radomir Nikolić	Serbian Progressive Party	16 April 2014 – 28 April 2014	1976
Bojan Pajtić	Democratic Party	16 April 2014 – 16 April 2014	1970
Miodrag Rakić	Social Democratic Party	16 April 2014 – 13 May 2014	1975
Marija Stevanović	Serbian Progressive Party	16 April 2014 – 15 September 2014	1977
Nebojša Stefanović	Serbian Progressive Party	16 April 2014 – 27 April 2014	1976
Miodrag Stojković	Democratic Party	16 April 2014 – 23 April 2014	1964
Marinika Tepić	League of Social Democrats of Vojvodina	16 April 2014 – 24 April 2014	1974
Sanja Tucaković	Serbian Progressive Party	10 May 2014 – 12 June 2014	1973
Vanja Udovičić	Serbian Progressive Party	16 April 2014 – 27 April 2014	1982
Petar Škundrić	Socialist Party of Serbia	16 April 2014 – 30 June 2014	1947
