= Nevenka =

Nevenka is a South Slavic feminine given name, cognate to Nevena. The masculine equivalent is Nevenko or Neven.

Notable people with the name include:

- Nevenka Bečić (born 1958), Croatian entrepreneur and politician.
- Nevenka Fernández (born 1974), Spanish economist.
- Nevenka Lisak, Croatian competitive figure skater.
- Nevenka Koprivšek (1959–2021), Slovenian actress.
- Nevenka Kostadinova (born 1972), Serbian politician.
- Nevenka Mikulic (born 1979), Croatian kickboxer and boxer.
- Nevenka Milošević (born 1966), Serbian politician.
- Nevenka Petrić (1927–2015), Serbian writer and academic.
- Nevenka Pogačnik (born 1936), Slovenian gymnast.
- Nevenka Puškarević (born 1952), Yugoslav gymnast.
