= Nadica =

Nadica is a feminine given name of South Slavic origin. It is a diminutive form of Nada.

== List of people with the given name ==
- Nadica Božanić (born 2001), Serbian taekwondo practitioner
- Nadica Dreven Budinski (born 1962), Croatian politician
- Nadica Nikolić Tanasijević (born 1970), Serbian politician

== See also ==
- Nadia (given name)
