= Aleksandra Tomić =

Serbian politician

- Александра Томић

Member of the National Assembly of the Republic of Serbia
- Incumbent
- Assumed office 23 July 2024
- In office 31 May 2012 – 6 February 2024

Member of the Parliamentary Assembly of the Council of Europe
- In office 24 November 2017 – 9 October 2022

Leader of Serbia's delegation to the Parliamentary Assembly of the Council of Europe
- In office 24 November 2017 – 24 January 2021
- Preceded by: Aleksandra Đurović
- Succeeded by: Ivica Dačić

Leader of Serbia's delegation to the Parliamentary Dimension of the Central European Initiative
- In office 2014–2016
- Preceded by: Ljubiša Stojmirović
- Succeeded by: Ljubiša Stojmirović

President of the Executive Council of the Zvezdara Municipal Assembly
- In office 17 October 2000 – 13 June 2001
- Preceded by: Petar Moravac
- Succeeded by: Dragan Komarica

Personal details
- Born: 26 April 1969 (age 56) Vranje, SR Serbia, SFR Yugoslavia
- Party: DSS (until c. 2008); SNS (c. 2008–present)
- Profession: Doctor of Economic Sciences

Aleksandra Tomić (Serbian Cyrillic: Александра Томић; born 26 April 1969) is a Serbian politician. She is currently serving her sixth term in the Serbian national assembly and has held leading positions in the assembly's oversight of finance and the economy. Tomić is a member of the Serbian Progressive Party (SNS).

== Early life and career ==
Tomić was born in Vranje, in what was then the Socialist Republic of Serbia in the Socialist Federal Republic of Yugoslavia. She is a graduate of the University of Belgrade Faculty of Mechanical Engineering, holds a master's degree and a Ph.D. from the private Alfa University in Belgrade, and has been an associate professor at Alfa University and Belgrade's College of Business Economics and Entrepreneurship.

== Politician ==
=== Democratic Party of Serbia ===
Tomić entered political life as a member of the Democratic Party of Serbia (DSS). The DSS participated in the 2000 Serbian local elections as part of the Democratic Opposition of Serbia (DOS) alliance, and in that year Tomić was elected to the assembly of Belgrade's Zvezdara municipality as a DOS candidate. (This was the last local election cycle in which delegates were elected for single-member constituency seats; all subsequent cycles have taken place under proportional representation.) The DOS won an absolute victory in Zvezdara, taking all fifty-three seats. When the new assembly was constituted on 17 October 2000, Tomić was chosen as president of its executive board, overseeing its local government. She was re-assigned as a member of the board on 13 June 2001 and remained in this position until 2004.

The DSS contested the 2004 local elections on its own, and Tomić received the eighth position on its electoral list in Zvezdara. The list won eight mandates, and she was not initially included in her party's assembly delegation. (In the 2004 local elections, the first one-third of mandates were awarded to candidates on successful lists in numerical order, while the remaining two-thirds were assigned to other candidates at the discretion of the sponsoring parties or coalitions. Tomić's list position did not give her an automatic right to a seat.) She received a mandate on 18 February 2005 as the replacement for another party member. After a period of instability, a new local coalition government was formed on 28 June 2005 with Milan Popović of the Democratic Party (DS) serving as mayor. The DSS participated in the coalition, and Tomić was appointed as a member of the municipal council, a successor body to the executive board. She served in this role until 2008.

Tomić also appeared in the fifty-second position on the DSS's list for the City Assembly of Belgrade in the 2004 local elections. The party won thirteen seats, and she was not selected for its delegation at the city level. She did not seek re-election in Zvezdara in 2008.

=== Serbian Progressive Party ===
Tomić joined the Progressive Party after its formation in late 2008.

==== Parliamentarian ====
Serbia's electoral system was reformed in 2011, such that all mandates were awarded to candidates on successful lists in numerical order. Tomić received the fifty-fourth position on the Progressive Party's Let's Get Serbia Moving list in the 2012 Serbian parliamentary election and was elected when the list won a plurality victory with seventy-three out of 250 mandates. The Progressives formed a coalition government with the Socialist Party of Serbia (SPS) and other parties after the election, and Tomić served as a supporter of the administration. In her first term, she was the chair of the economy committee, (Note: Formally known as the Committee for the Economy, Regional Development, Trade, Tourism, and Energy.) a member of the environmental protection committee, a deputy member of the committee for European integration, the leader of Serbia's parliamentary friendship groups with Egypt and Indonesia, and a member of the friendship groups with Armenia, Austria, Brazil, China, Germany, Slovakia, Slovenia, South Africa, Tunisia, and Venezuela.

She was promoted to the ninth position on the SNS-led list in the 2014 parliamentary election. This was tantamount to election, and she was indeed re-elected when the list won a landslide majority victory with 158 mandates. She continued to chair the economy committee and was also a member of the European integration committee and the committee for foreign affairs, the leader of Serbia's delegation to the parliamentary dimension of the Central European Initiative, the leader of Serbia's friendship group with Indonesia, and a member of the friendship groups with Austria, Belarus, China, Egypt, Germany, Russia, Slovenia, Switzerland, and Venezuela.

In the 2016 parliamentary election, Tomić received the sixth position on the SNS's list and was elected to a third term when the list won a second majority victory with 131 mandates. In the 2016–20 parliament, she chaired the finance committee (Note: Formally known as the Committee on Finance, State Budget, and Control of Public Spending.) and was deputy chair of the economy committee, a member of the European Union–Serbia committee on stabilization and association, the president of the friendship group with Italy, and a member of the friendship groups with Algeria, Austria, Azerbaijan, Belarus, Bulgaria, China, the Czech Republic, Egypt, France, Germany, Greece, Hungary, India, Indonesia, Israel, Japan, the Netherlands, Romania, Russia, Slovakia, Slovenia, South Korea, Switzerland, Turkey, the United Kingdom, and Venezuela.

Tomić received the 105th position on the Progressive Party's For Our Children list in the 2020 parliamentary election and was again re-elected when the list won a landslide majority with 188 mandates. She continued to chair the finance committee and was a member of the economy committee, the stabilization and association committee, and the friendship groups with Canada, China, France, Germany, Italy, Russia, Slovenia, and Switzerland.

She was given the seventy-seventh position on the SNS list for the 2022 parliamentary election and was elected to a fifth term when the list won a plurality victory with 120 seats. In the term that followed, she was deputy chair of the finance committee, a member of the economy committee, the chair of a subcommittee for the consideration of reports on audits conducted by the state audit institution, the head of Serbia's friendship group with Germany, and a member of the friendship groups with Austria, Azerbaijan, Bosnia and Herzegovina, Canada, China, Cyprus, Egypt, France, Greece, Indonesia, Israel, Italy, Japan, Malta, Montenegro, Russia, Slovenia, South Korea, and the United Arab Emirates.

Tomić appeared in the 139th position on the SNS's Serbia Must Not Stop list in the 2023 Serbian parliamentary election and was not initially re-elected when the list won 129 seats. Several SNS delegates later resigned from the assembly, and Tomić received a new mandate on 1 July 2024 as a replacement for Sandra Božić. Her mandate was verified on 23 July. She is now once again a member of the European integration committee.

==== Council of Europe ====
Tomić was appointed as the head of Serbia's delegation to the Parliamentary Assembly of the Council of Europe (PACE) on 24 November 2017, replacing Aleksandra Đurović. She served in this role until 24 January 2021 and remained a member of Serbia's delegation to the PACE until 9 October 2022. As a PACE delegate, she was at different times a member of the committee on legal affairs and human rights, the committee on political affairs and democracy, the committee on the honouring of obligations and commitments by member states of the Council of Europe, and the committee on migration, refugees, and displaced persons. She also served on the sub-committee on human rights and the sub-committee on relations with the Organisation for Economic Co-operation and Development (OECD) and the European Bank for Reconstruction and Development (EBRD). From January 2021 to October 2022, she was Ivica Dačić's alternate on the sub-committee on external relations. Tomić was a member of the European People's Party (EPP) assembly group.

In April 2018, she urged European institutions to condemn the arrest of Marko Đurić by Republic of Kosovo authorities and the concurrent assault on Kosovo Serbs by members of the Kosovo Police during a political meeting in North Mitrovica.

==== Local politics ====
Tomić led the SNS list for Zvezdara in the 2016 Serbian local elections and was re-elected to the municipal assembly when the list won twenty-one out of fifty-three mandates. She resigned her seat on 29 September 2016.

== Electoral record ==
=== Local (Municipal Assembly of Zvezdara) ===
2000 Zvezdara municipal election: Division 16 ("Zvezdara II")
Candidate	Party
Aleksandra Tomić (***WINNER***)	Democratic Opposition of Serbia (Affiliation: Democratic Party of Serbia)
Gordana Njegomirović	Serbian Radical Party
other candidates	
Total
