= Radivoje Jovanović =

Radivoje Jovanović may refer to:

- Radivoje Jovanović Bradonja, Yugoslav Partisan
- Radivoje Jovanović (Serbian politician, born 1939), Serbian politician
