= Olivette (given name) =

Feminine given name

- Pronunciation: US: //ɑl.ɪ.ˈvɛt//, UK: //ɒl.ɪ.ˈvɛt//
- Gender: feminine

Other names
- Derived: olive tree
- Usage: English, French
- Related names: Oliver (m)

Olivette is a feminine given name and feminine form of Oliver. Notable people with the name include:

- Olivette Bice (born 1968), Vanuatuan sprinter
- Olivette Miller (1914–2003), American musician
- Olivette Otele (born 1970), historian at Bristol University
- Olivette Thibault (1914–1995), Canadian stage, film and television actress

== Fictional characters ==
- Olivette, a character in the 1879 opera Les noces d'Olivette.

== See also ==
- Olivera
- Oliver
