= Nikola Jolović =

Nikola Jolović may refer to:

- Nikola Jolović (footballer)
- Nikola Jolović (politician)
