= 10th National Assembly =

10th National Assembly may refer to:

- 10th legislature of the French Fifth Republic
- 10th Nigeria National Assembly
- 10th National Assembly of Serbia
