= Bogatinov =

Bogatinov (also spelt Bogatinović) is a surname. People with the surname include:

- Oliver Bogatinov, a Slovenian association football manager
- Martin Bogatinov, a Macedonian footballer
- Žarko Bogatinović, a Serbian politician
