= Olivera (given name) =

Slavic feminine given name

- Pronunciation: Serbo-Croatian: [olivera]
- Gender: feminine

Origin
- Language: Slavic

Other names
- Derived: olive tree
- Usage: Serbian, Croatian, Macedonian
- Related names: Oliver (m)

Olivera (Cyrillic: Оливера) is a Slavic feminine given name and feminine form of Oliver.

Notable people with the name include:

- Olivera Balašević (born 1959), Serbian actress
- Olivera Bacić (born 1992), Serbian actress
- Olivera Baljak (born 1956), Croatian actress
- Olivera Čangalović (born 1960), Serbian basketball player
- Olivera Ćirković (born 1969), Serbian writer and painter, former convicted criminal and former professional basketball player and administrator
- Olivera Verica Djordjević (1922-1942), Yugoslav dressmaker and partisan of the Yugoslav People's Liberation War
- Olivera Đurđević (1928-2006), Serbian musician
- Olivera Finn (born 1949), Yugoslav-American immunologist
- Olivera Galović (1923-2000), Serbian painter
- Olivera Gajić (1927-1994), Serbian film director, screenwriter and actress
- Olivera Gajić, Serbian costume designer
- Olivera Gavrić Pavić (born 1964), Serbian painter
- Olivera Grbić (1932-2020), Serbian painter
- Olivera Injac (born 1972), Montenegrin politician
- Olivera Jašar-Nasteva (1922-2000), Macedonian linguist
- Olivera Jevtić (born 1977), Serbian athlete
- Olivera Ježina (born 1960), Serbian actress
- Olivera Jovićević (born 1966), Serbian television presenter
- Olivera Jurić (born 1984), Bosnian weightlifter
- Olivera Jurisic (born 1989), Danish handball player
- Olivera Katarina (born 1940), Serbian actress, singer and writer
- Olivera Kjorverziroska (born 1965), Macedonian writer
- Olivera Kovačević (born 1967), Serbian television presenter and journalist
- Olivera Kostić (born 1991), Serbian volleyball player
- Olivera Krivokapić (born 1962), Yugoslav basketball player
- Olivera Lakić (born 1969), Montenegrin investigative journalist
- Olivera Lazarević (1372-1444), Serbian princess and the wife of Ottoman Sultan Bayezid I
- Olivera Marković (1925-2011), Serbian actress
- Olivera Medić (born 1990), Serbian volleyball player
- Olivera Miljaković (born 1934), Serbian-Austrian opera singer
- Olivera Milunović (born 1992), Serbian footballer
- Olivera Milosavljević (1951-2015), Serbian historian
- Olivera Moldovan (born 1989), Serbian sprint canoeist
- Olivera Mrnjavčević (14th-century), Serbian noblewoman
- Olivera Nakovska-Bikova (born 1974), Macedonian sports shooter
- Olivera Nedeljković (born 1959), Serbian politician
- Olivera Nedeljković (born 1973), Serbian writer
- Olivera Nikolova (1936-2024), Macedonian writer
- Olivera Ognjanović (born 1969), Serbian politician
- Olivera Pauljeskić (born 1971), Serbian politician
- Olivera Pešić (born 1979), Serbian politician
- Olivera Poppankova (1925 - death unknown), Macedonian radio presenter
- Olivera Prokopovic (1949-2007), Serbian chess player
- Olivera Protić (born 1962), Serbian painter
- Olivera Radojković Ćolović (1929-2010), Serbian physician
- Olivera Skoko (born 1974), Serbian art historian
- Olivera Stanišić (born 1974), Serbian painter
- Olivera Tomov (1922-2006), Serbian puppeteer
- Olivera Viktorović (born 1963), Serbian actress
- Olivera Vukčević (born 1995), Montenegrin handball player

== Fictional characters ==
- Olivera Antonovic, character in the 1991 Yugoslav comedy television series "In the name of the law".
