= Nevena =

Nevena (Cyrillic: Невена) is a feminine given name popular in South Slavic languages.

The name is the feminine form of the masculine name Neven, which means Calendula officinalis.

Notable people with the name include:

- Nevena Božović (born 1994), Serbian singer
- Nevena Bridgen, British-Serbian opera singer and blogger
- Nevena Ignjatović (born 1990), Serbian alpine skier
- Nevena Jovanović (born 1990), Serbian basketball player
- Nevena Karanović (born 1961), Serbian politician
- Nevena Kokanova (1938–2008), Bulgarian film actress
- Nevena Lenđel (born 1979), Croatian high jumper
- Nevena Senior née Deleva (born 1959), Bulgarian English bridge player
- Nevena Tsoneva (born 1986), Bulgarian singer
- Nevena Veinović, Serbian politician

== See also ==
- Nevenka
