= Bratimir Vasiljević =

Serbian politician

Bratimir Vasiljević (Serbian Cyrillic: Братимир Васиљевић; born 12 February 1953) is a politician in Serbia. He is currently serving his second term in the National Assembly of Serbia. He has also been active in the municipal government of Niš and served as mayor of the city's Pantelej municipality from 2016 to 2020. Vasiljević is a member of the Serbian Progressive Party.

== Early life and private career ==
Vasiljević is a graduated manager. He worked for the companies Zaječar and Prosveta in Belgrade before 1981, was the head of a sports equipment store in the same city from 1981 to 1989, and operated a private business from 1998 to 2008.

== Politician ==
Vasiljević appeared on the electoral list of the far-right Serbian Radical Party in the 2008 Serbian parliamentary election. He was not selected for a mandate. The Radical Party experienced a significant split later in 2008, with several prominent members joining the new Serbian Progressive Party under the leadership of Tomislav Nikolić and Aleksandar Vučić. Vasiljević sided with the Progressives.

He was elected to the Pantelej municipal assembly in the 2012 Serbian local elections and was subsequently chosen as its president (i.e., speaker). He also received the twenty-ninth position on the Progressive list for the city assembly of Niš in 2012 and was not immediately elected when the list won seventeen mandates. He was given a city mandate in 2014 as the replacement for Ljubica Mrdaković Todorović and resigned from the Pantelej assembly not long thereafter.

Vasiljević was given the 149th position on the Progressive Party's Aleksandar Vučić — Future We Believe In list in the 2014 parliamentary election and was elected list when the list won a majority with 158 out of 250 mandates. He served as a backbench supporter of the government for the next two years and was not a candidate for re-election at the republic level in 2016.

Re-elected to the Pantelej municipal assembly in the 2016 local elections, he was subsequently chosen as president (i.e., mayor) of the municipality when the Progressives formed an alliance with the Radicals and the Democratic Party of Serbia. He was again re-elected to the Pantelej municipal assembly in the 2020 Serbian local elections.

Vasiljević received the sixty-fifth position on the Progressive Party's Aleksandar Vučić — For Our Children list in the 2020 Serbian parliamentary election and was elected to a second term when the list won a landslide majority with 188 mandates. He contracted COVID-19 during the 2020 global pandemic, not long after being re-elected to the national assembly; his condition was serious, although he subsequently recovered.

He is now a member of the assembly committee on finance, state budget, and control of public spending; a member of the committee on the judiciary, public administration, and local self-government; a deputy member of the committee on Kosovo-Metohija; and a member of the parliamentary friendship groups with Albania, Azerbaijan, the Bahamas, Belarus, Botswana, Bulgaria, Cameroon, the Central African Republic, Comoros, Croatia, the Dominican Republic, Ecuador, Equatorial Guinea, Eritrea, Germany, Greece, Grenada, Guinea-Bissau, Hungary, Italy, Jamaica, Japan, Kyrgyzstan, Laos, Liberia, Madagascar, Mali, Mauritius, Montenegro, Mozambique, Nauru, Nicaragua, Nigeria, North Macedonia, Norway, Palau, Paraguay, Papua New Guinea, the Republic of Congo, Russia, Saint Vincent and the Grenadines, Sao Tome and Principe, Slovenia, the Solomon Islands, South Sudan, Sri Lanka, Sudan, Suriname, Togo, Trinidad and Tobago, Turkey, the United States of America, Uruguay, and Uzbekistan.
