= Živan Đurišić =

Serbian politician

Živan Đurišić (Serbian Cyrillic: Живан Ђуришић; born 1947) is a politician in Serbia. He is a member of the Serbian Progressive Party, currently serving his second term in the National Assembly of Serbia.

== Private career ==
Đurišić was a municipal court judge in Velika Plana. He is now retired.

== Political career ==
Đurišić received the 140th position on the Progressive Party's Let's Get Serbia Moving coalition electoral list in the 2012 Serbian parliamentary election. The list won seventy-three seats, and he was not elected. He was promoted to the ninety-fifth position on the successor Aleksandar Vučić — Future We Believe In list for the 2014 parliamentary election and was elected to his first term when the list won a landslide victory with 158 out of 250 mandates. For the next two years, he served with the government's parliamentary majority.

He was given the 145th position on the Progressive-led list in the 2016 parliamentary election. The list won a second consecutive majority with 131 seats. Đurišić was not immediately re-elected, but he was awarded a new mandate on June 7, 2018, as a replacement for Željko Sušec, who had resigned.
