= Miloš Tošanić =

Serbian politician

Miloš Tošanić (Serbian Cyrillic: Милош Тошанић; born 1964) is a politician in Serbia. He was a member of the National Assembly of Serbia from 2014 to 2016 and is now serving his third term in the municipal assembly of Lazarevac in Belgrade.

== Private career ==
Tošanić was born in the Belgrade municipality of Zemun, in what was then the Socialist Republic of Serbia in the Socialist Federal Republic of Yugoslavia. He received a degree from the Faculty of Industrial Management at Union University in 2009, obtained a master's degree in 2010, and has pursued doctoral studies at the University of Novi Sad Faculty of Technical Sciences.

He has been an advisor to Serbia's minister of energy, development, and environmental protection and has led the sports centre Kolubara.

== Politician ==
=== Municipal politics ===
Tošanić received the fifth position on the Progressive Party's electoral list for the Lazarevac municipal assembly in the 2012 Serbian local elections and was elected when the list won ten mandates, finishing third against the lists of the Socialist Party of Serbia and the Democratic Party. He was given the eleventh position on the Progressive Party's list for the 2016 Serbian local elections and was re-elected when the list won a plurality victory with twenty-seven out of sixty-one seats. The Progressive Party formed a local coalition government after the election, and Tošanić was appointed to the municipal council (i.e., the executive branch of the municipal government).

Tošanić was re-elected to the Lazarevac assembly in the 2020 Serbian local elections, in which the party won a majority victory with thirty-five seats.

=== Parliamentarian ===
Tošanić was given the 106th position on the Progressive Party's Aleksandar Vučić — Future We Believe In list for the 2014 Serbian parliamentary election and was elected when the list won a majority victory with 158 out of 250 mandates. He served in parliament for the next two years as a supporter of the government. During this time, he was a member of the defence and internal affairs committee and the committee on finance, state budget, and control of public spending; a deputy member of the committee on the economy, regional development, trade, tourism, and energy; and a member of Serbia's parliamentary friendship groups with France, Greece, Japan, Russia, and Switzerland.

He was given the 202nd position on the party's list in the 2016 parliamentary election and was not re-elected when the list won 131 mandates.
