= Prilike =

Prilike Прилике
- Village
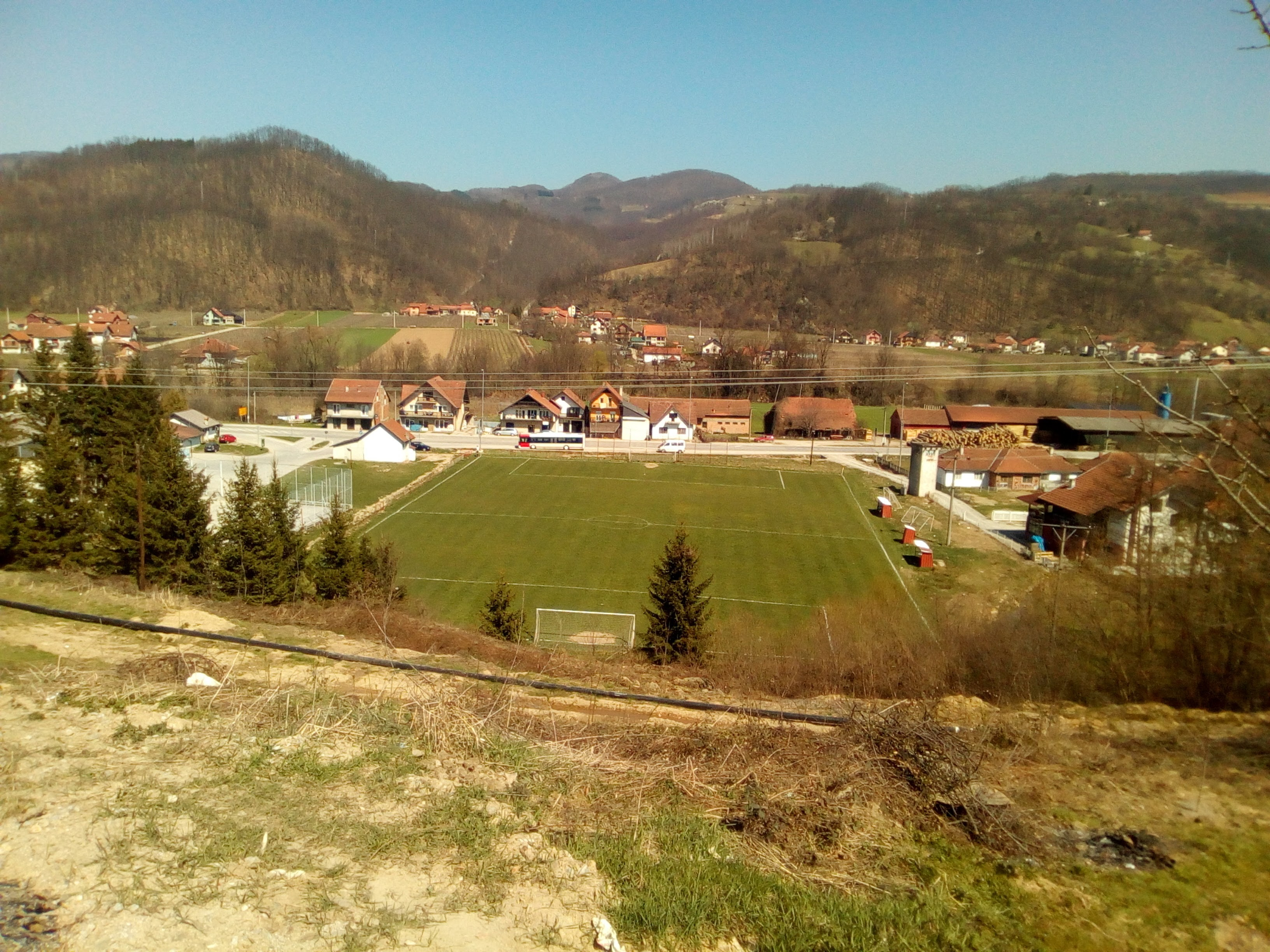
- Panorama of Prilike

- Location within Serbia
- Coordinates: 43°37′N 20°08′E
- Country: Serbia
- District: Moravica District
- Municipality: Ivanjica

Area
  - Total: 16.23 km^{2} (6.27 sq mi)
- Elevation: 391 m (1,283 ft)

Population (2011)
  - Total: 1,311
  - Density: 80.78/km^{2} (209.2/sq mi)
- Time zone: UTC+1 (CET)
  - Summer (DST): UTC+2 (CEST)

Prilike is a village located in the municipality of Ivanjica, Serbia. According to the 2011 census, the village has a population of 1,311 inhabitants.

== Gallery ==
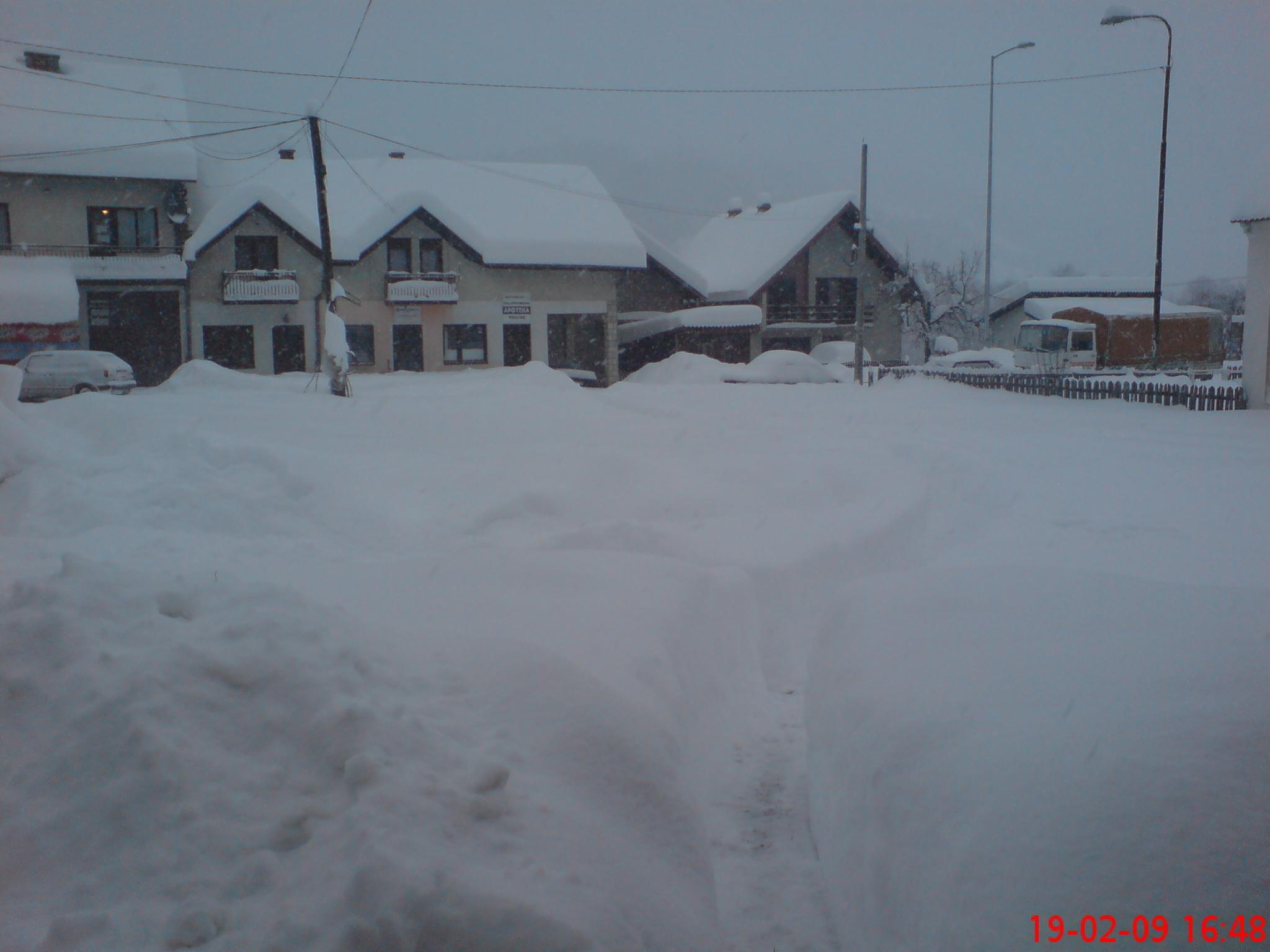
Buildings in Prilike during winter, February 2009

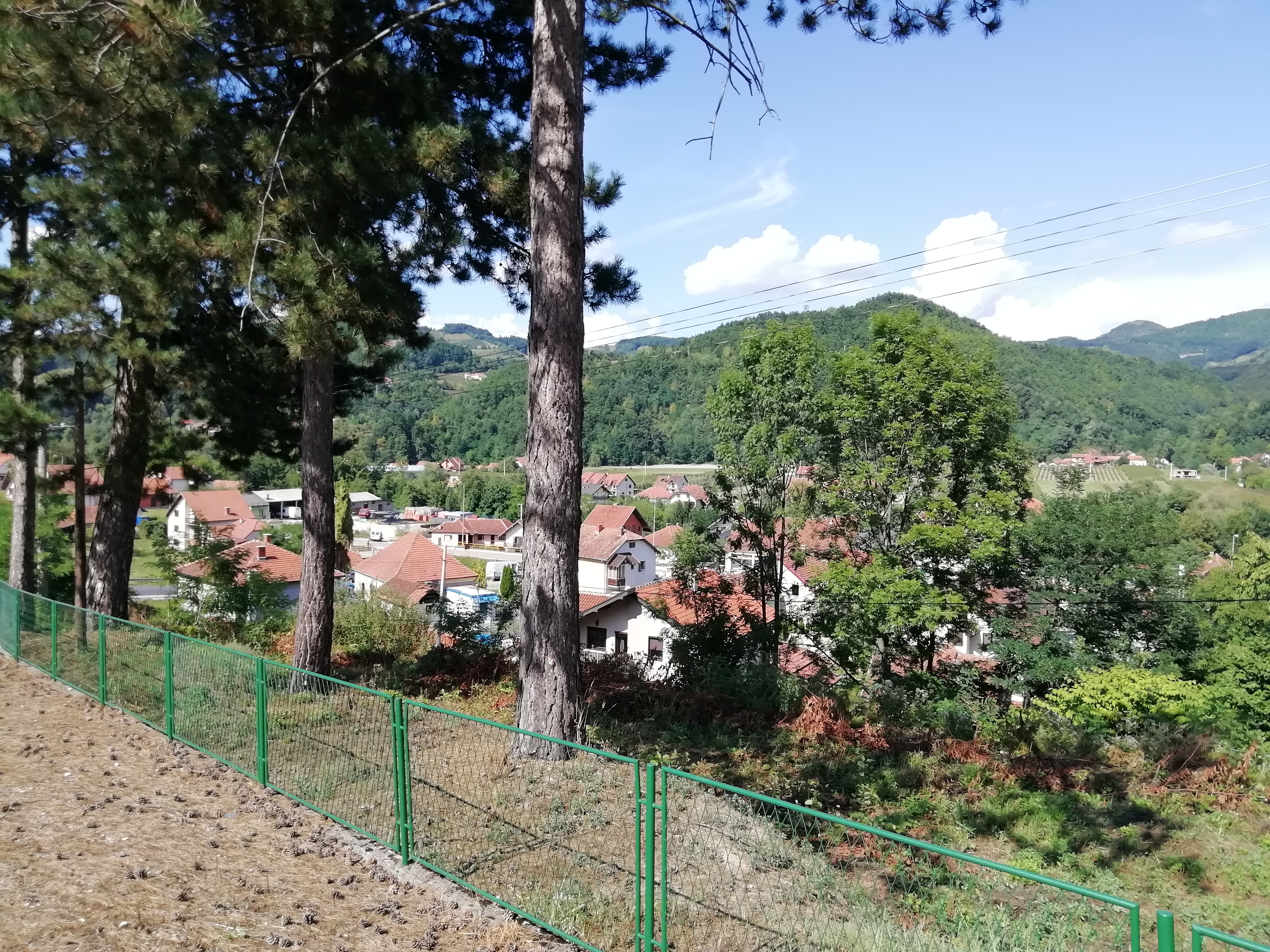
Panoramic view of Prilike

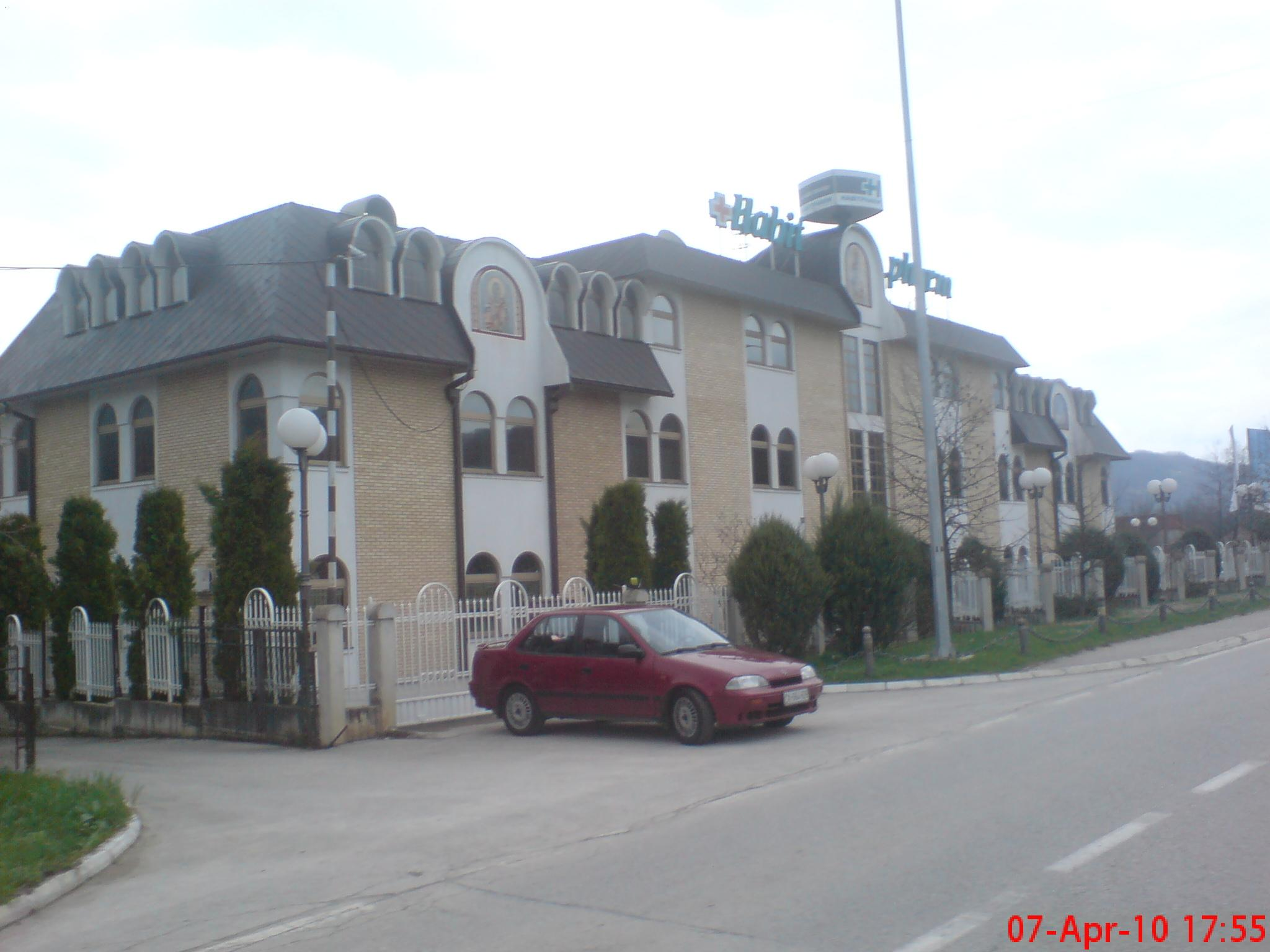
Former "Habitpharm" building

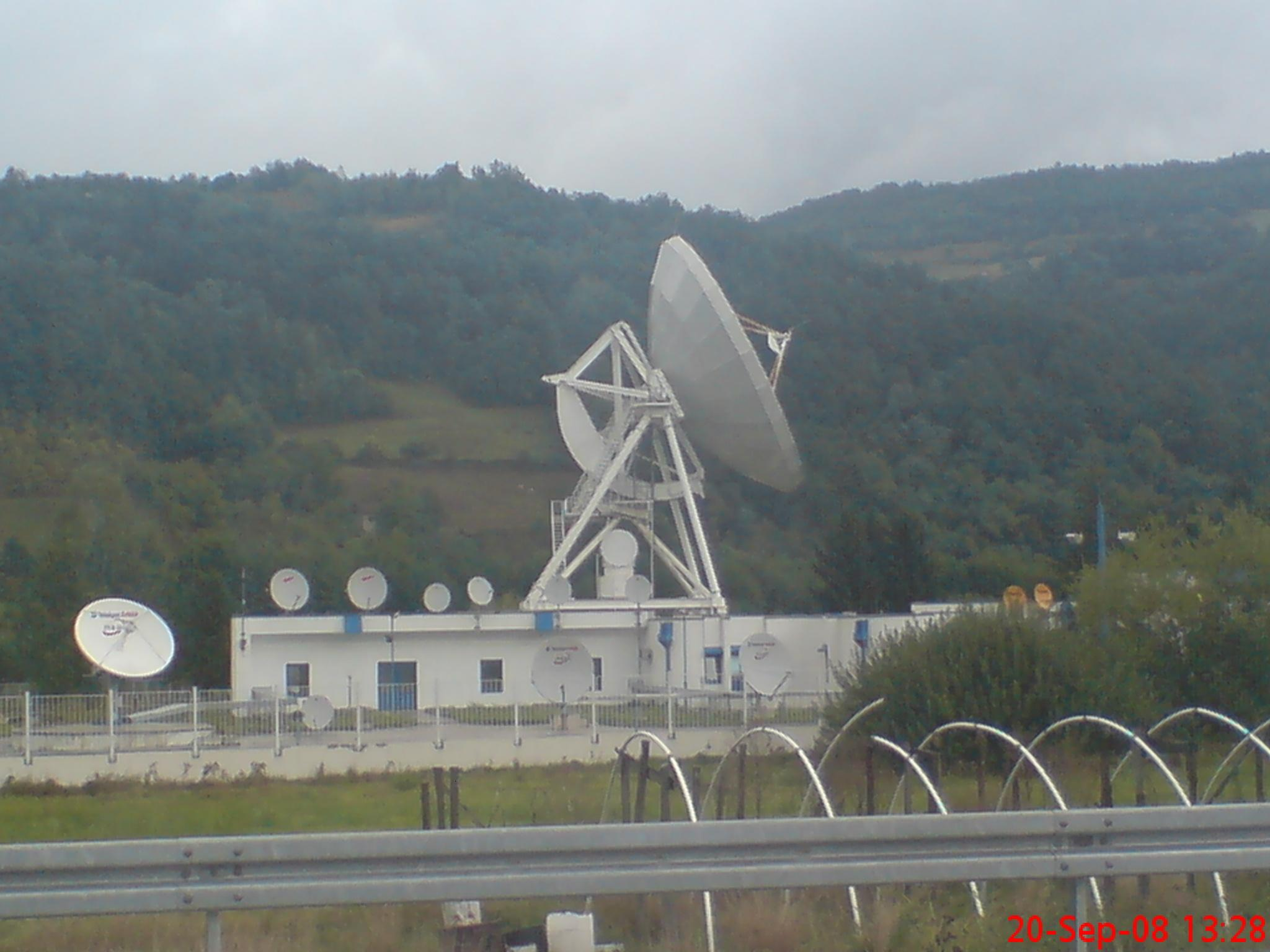
Ground station Ivanjica

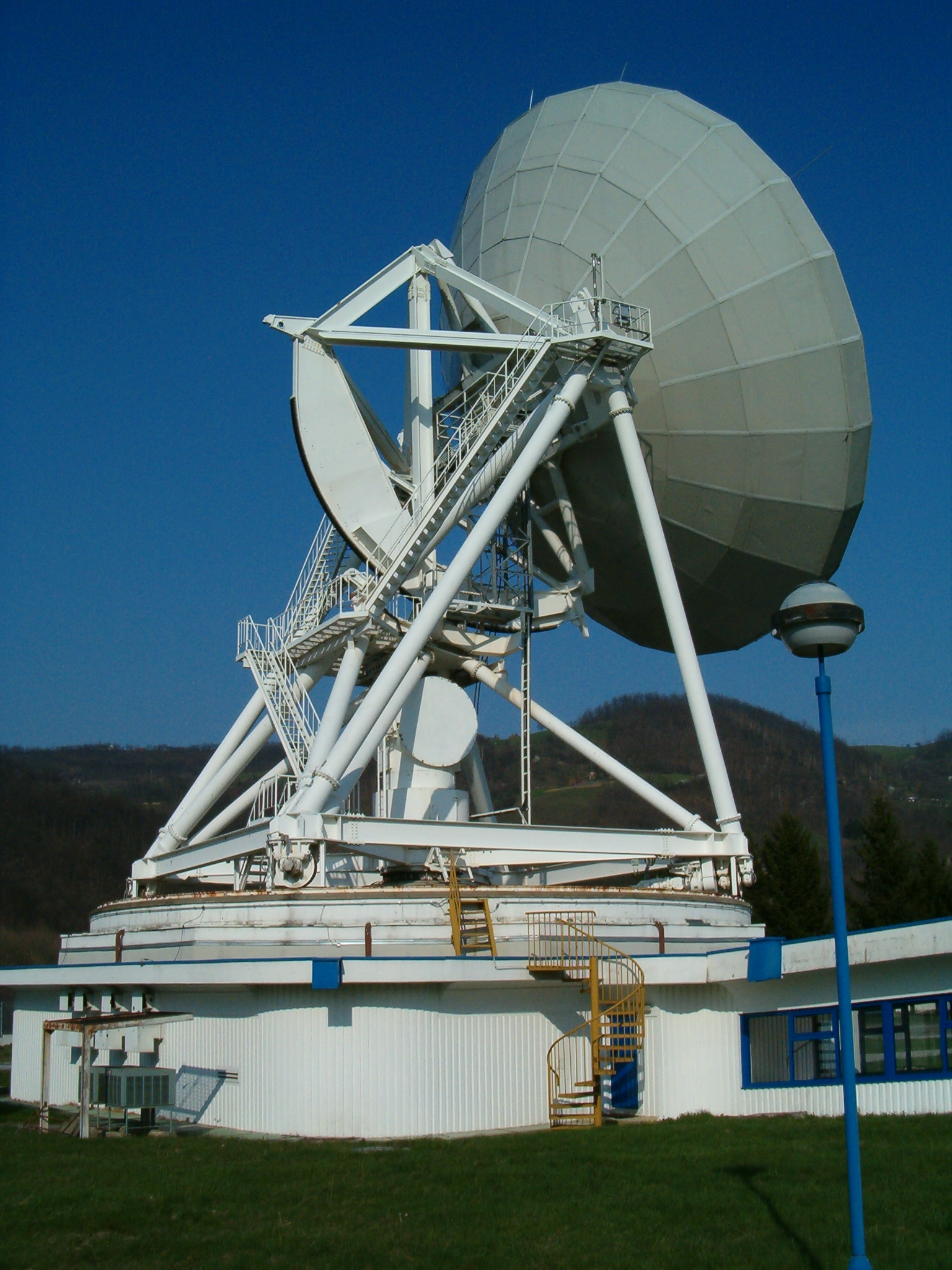
Ground station Ivanjica
