= Neven (given name) =

- Pronunciation: Serbo-Croatian: [ˈneːven] Slovene: [ˈnéʋèn]
- Gender: Male
- Language: Serbo-Croatian

Origin
- Origin: neven, meaning Calendula officinalis
- Region of origin: Balkans

Other names
- Related names: Nevena

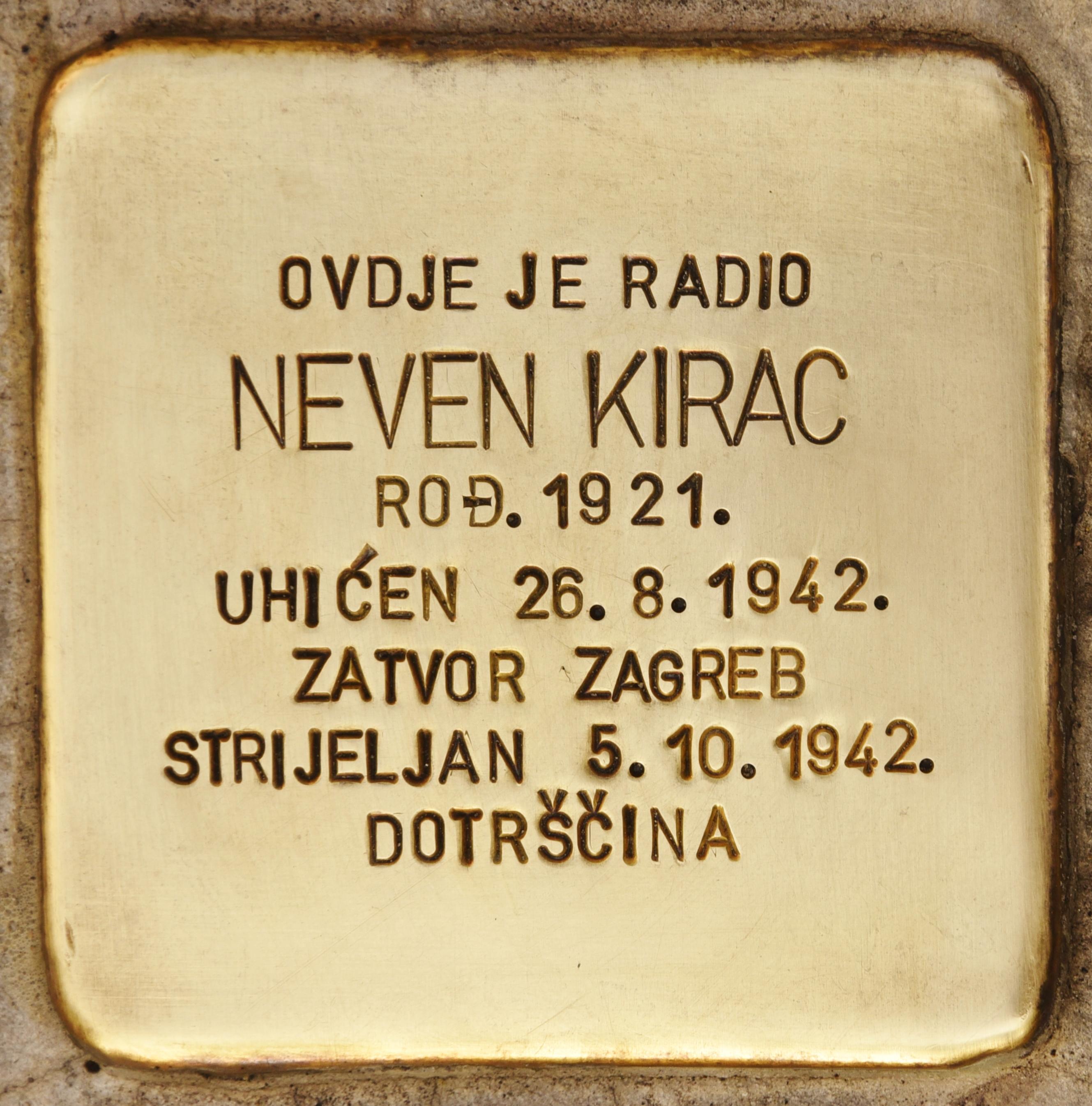
A stumbling stone memorial for a person named Neven Kirac in Zagreb, Croatia.

Neven (Cyrillic: Невен) is a Slavic masculine given name, meaning Calendula officinalis in the Serbo-Croatian language. It is the masculine form of the feminine Slavic name, Nevena.

== Popularity ==
Neven is the 699th most popular masculine name and 1387th most popular name overall in Slovenia as of 2025. It reached the height of its popularity in the 1980s and fell quickly afterwards, but has since leveled off.

== People ==
- Neven Jurica (born 1952), Croatian politician
- Neven Maguire (born 1974), Irish celebrity chef and television personality
- Neven Marković (born 1987), Bosnian football player
- Neven Mimica (born 1953), Croatian politician and diplomat
- Neven Pajkić (born 1977), Bosnian-Canadian heavyweight boxer
- Neven Sesardić (born 1949), Croatian philosopher
- Neven Spahija (born 1962), Croatian basketball head coach
- Neven Subotić (born 1988), Serbian football defender
- Neven Venkov (born 1982), Bulgarian football midfielder
- Neven Vukman (born 1985), Croatian football midfielder
- Neven Žugaj (born 1983), Croatian male wrestler
