= Nevenka Milošević =

Serbian politician

- Невенка Милошевић
- Born: 12 June 1966 (age 59); Prilike, Ivanjica, SFR Yugoslavia
- Occupations: Politician, administrator and teacher
- Political party: Serbian Progressive Party

Nevenka Milošević (Serbian Cyrillic: Невенка Милошевић; born 12 June 1966) is a Serbian politician, administrator and teacher. She served in the National Assembly of Serbia from 2014 to 2016 as a member of the Serbian Progressive Party.

== Early life and career ==
Milošević was born in the village of Prilike, Ivanjica, in what was then the Socialist Republic of Serbia in the Socialist Federal Republic of Yugoslavia. She graduated as a class teacher in 1988, worked as an elementary school teacher in Ivanjica, and has taken post-graduate studies in mathematics teaching methods.

== Politician ==
Milošević has been vice-president of the Progressive Party's municipal board in Ivanjica and was president (i.e., speaker) of the Ivanjica municipal assembly from 2012 to 2014.

She received the 189th position on the Progressive Party's Let's Get Serbia Moving electoral list in the 2012 Serbian parliamentary election. The list won seventy-three seats, and she was not elected. She was promoted to the 138th position on the party's successor Aleksandar Vučić — Future We Believe In list in the 2014 parliamentary election and was elected when the list won a landslide victory with 158 seats. For the next two years, she served as a supporter of the government of Serbia in the legislature. She was a member of the Women's Parliamentary Network.

Milošević was given the 162nd position on the Progressive list in the 2016 election and was not re-elected when the list won 131 mandates. In 2018, she was appointed as director of the Kirilo Savić school in Ivanjica.
