= Radivoje Jovanović (Serbian politician, born 1939) =

Serbian politician (born 1939)

Radivoje Jovanović (Serbian Cyrillic: Радивоје Јовановић; born 5 March 1939) is a Serbian former politician. He served in the parliaments of Serbia and the Federal Republic of Yugoslavia and was the mayor of Mladenovac for three terms. Jovanović began his career as a member of the League of Communists of Serbia (SKS); when Serbia re-introduced multi-party democracy in 1990, he joined the successor Socialist Party of Serbia (SPS).

== Early life and career ==
Jovanović was born in the settlement of Vlaška in Mladenovac, in what was then the Danube Banovina of the Kingdom of Yugoslavia. He is an engineer of organized labour and at one time worked for the company Keramika.

== Politician ==
=== First term as mayor (1974–78) ===
Jovanović was appointed to the permanent presidency of the Belgrade city organization of the League of Communists of Serbia in February 1974. The following month, he became mayor of Mladenovac for the first time at the nomination of the Serbian Socialist Alliance of Working People (SSRNJ). In January 1975, he welcomed Yugoslavian president Tito on an official visit to the municipality.

In his first term as mayor, Jovanović oversaw a major waterworks construction project in Mladenovac, addressing what was widely perceived as the municipality's main infrastructural concern. He served until 1978, when he was succeeded by Vlastimir Damnjanović.

=== Return to political life (1989–97) ===
Jovanović became mayor of Mladenovac for a second term following the 1989 Serbian local elections. The following year, the SKS merged with the Serbian SSRNJ to create the Socialist Party of Serbia, and Jovanović became a founding member of the new party.

The Socialist Federal Republic of Yugoslavia ceased to exist in 1992, and the Federal Republic of Yugoslavia, comprising the republics of Serbia and Montenegro, was established in the same year. Jovanović was elected to the Yugoslavian parliament's Chamber of Citizens in the May 1992 Yugoslavian election, winning in the Mladenovac division. The Socialists and their Montenegrin allies won a majority victory overall. Jovanović was also re-elected to the Mladenovac municipal assembly in the concurrent May 1992 Serbian local elections and served afterward for a third term as mayor.

The May 1992 elections were boycotted by several leading Serbian opposition parties, and ongoing questions about the legitimacy of the vote led to new elections at the federal, republican, and local levels in December 1992. Jovanović was not a candidate in the December 1992 Yugoslavian parliamentary election. He instead appeared in the sixteenth position on the Socialist Party's electoral list for the Belgrade division in the concurrent Serbian parliamentary election and was included in his party's assembly delegation when the list won fourteen seats. (From 1992 to 2000, Serbia's electoral law stipulated that one-third of parliamentary mandates would be assigned to candidates from successful lists in numerical order, while the remaining two-thirds would be distributed amongst other candidates at the discretion of the sponsoring parties. Jovanović's relatively low list position did not prevent him from receiving a mandate.) He was not re-elected to the Mladenovac assembly in the December 1992 Serbian local elections, and available online sources do not indicate if he was a candidate. His final term as mayor ended in January 1993.

The Socialists won a plurality victory in the 1992 Serbian parliamentary election and afterward formed a new administration with unofficial support from the far-right Serbian Radical Party (SRS). In the assembly, Jovanović served on the committee on justice and administration and the committee on administrative and mandate-immunity issues.

The Socialist Party's alliance with the Radicals broke down in 1993, and a new parliamentary election was held in December of that year. Jovanović appeared in the thirtieth position on the Socialist Party's list in Belgrade and was again awarded a mandate when the list won sixteen seats. The Socialists emerged in a stronger position after this election and afterward formed a new government with support from New Democracy (ND). Jovanović served on the committee for labour, veterans' protection, and social affairs.

In the 1997 Serbian parliamentary election, Jovanović appeared in the eighth position on the Socialist Party's list for the smaller, redistributed division of Voždovac. The list won four seats, and he did not receive a mandate for a third term in the republican parliament.

== Electoral record ==
=== Federal (FR Yugoslavia) ===
May 1992 Yugoslavian federal election: Mladenovac
Candidate	Party	Votes	%
Radivoje Jovanović	Socialist Party of Serbia	25,224	46.71
Ljubiša Stojmirović	Serbian Radical Party	17,914	33.17
Radivoje Jašić	League of Communists – Movement for Yugoslavia	5,959	11.03
Predrag Kovačević	Citizens' Group	4,904	9.08
Total		54,001	100.00
