= Ljiljana Malušić =

Serbian politician

Ljiljana Malušić (Serbian Cyrillic: Љиљана Малушић; born 1 April 1958) is a politician in Serbia. She has served in the National Assembly of Serbia since 2014 as a member of the Serbian Progressive Party.

== Private career ==
Malušić has a bachelor's degree as a sociologist. She lives in Voždovac, Belgrade.

== Politician ==
=== Municipal politics ===
Malušić received the third position on the Progressive Party's electoral list for the Voždovac municipal assembly in the 2009 local election. The list won eighteen mandates. She was not selected for a mandate but instead became an assistant to the mayor and led the municipality's department of social work and culture. (From 2000 to 2011, mandates in Serbian elections were awarded to successful parties and coalitions rather than individual candidates, and it was common practice for the mandates to be assigned out of numerical order. Malušić did not automatically receive a mandate by virtue of her list position.)

Malušić also oversaw the commission for awarding construction and income packages for refugees from Bosnia and Herzegovina and Croatia and for internally displaced persons from Kosovo and Metohija. After the 2013 local elections, she became a member of the Voždovac municipal council (i.e., the executive branch of the municipal government). She resigned from this position when she was elected to parliament, as she could not hold a dual mandate.

=== Parliamentarian ===
Serbia's electoral system was reformed in 2011, such that mandates were awarded to candidates on successful lists in numerical order. Malušić received the sixty-seventh position on the Serbian Progressive Party's Aleksandar Vučić — Future We Believe In electoral list in the 2014 Serbian parliamentary election and was elected when the list won a landslide victory with 158 out of 250 mandates. She was promoted to the forty-second position on the successor Aleksandar Vučić – Serbia Is Winning list in the 2016 parliamentary election and was re-elected when the list won 131 mandates.

During the 2016–20 parliament, Malušić was a member of the parliamentary foreign affairs committee and the committee on human and minority rights and gender equality; a deputy member of the environmental protection committee; the head of Serbia's parliamentary friendship group with Indonesia; and a member of the parliamentary friendship groups with Belarus, Bolivia, Brazil, China, Cuba, Ghana, Greece, India, Iran, Mexico, Russia, Spain, Switzerland, Uganda, the United Kingdom, and the United States of America. She has also been a member of the Women's Parliamentary Network of Serbia.

She received the eighty-ninth position on the Progressive Party's Aleksandar Vučić — For Our Children coalition list in the 2020 Serbian parliamentary election and was elected to a third term when the list won a landslide majority with 188 mandates. She is now a member of the foreign affairs committee and the European integration committee, is a deputy member of the committee on the rights of the child, continues to lead the friendship group with Indonesia, and is a member of the friendship groups with Brazil, Chile, China, Cuba, Greece, Italy, Kenya, Kuwait, Malaysia, Mexico, Norway, Oman, Portugal, Russia, and the United States of America.
