= Ljiljana Beronja =

Serbian politician

Ljiljana Beronja (Serbian Cyrillic: Љиљана Бероња; born 1959) is a politician in Serbia. She served in the National Assembly of Serbia from 2014 to 2016 as a member of the Serbian Progressive Party.

== Private career ==
Beronja is a specialist pediatrician. She lives in Kula, Vojvodina, where she works as deputy director of the municipality's Health Center.

== Politician ==
=== Municipal ===
Beronja has served in the Kula municipal assembly. She received a mandate following the 2012 Serbian local elections, in which the Progressive Party's electoral list won seven out of thirty-seven seats. She was not a candidate for re-election in 2016.

As of 2020, Beronja serves on Kula's interdepartmental commission.

=== Parliamentarian ===
Beronja appeared in the 210th position (out of 250) on the Progressive Party's Let's Get Serbia Moving list in the 2012 Serbian parliamentary election. This was too low a position for election to be a realistic prospect, and indeed she was not elected when the list won seventy-three mandates.

She was given the 129th position on the Progressive list for the 2014 parliamentary election and was elected when the list won a majority victory with 158 mandates. During her time in parliament, she was a member of the committee on labour, social issues, social inclusion, and poverty reduction. She received the 204th position on the Progressive list in the 2016 parliamentary election and was not re-elected when the list won 131 mandates.
