= Dušica Stojković =

Serbian politician

Dušica Stojković (Serbian Cyrillic: Душица Стојковић; born 6 August 1979) is a politician in Serbia. She has served in the National Assembly of Serbia since 2014 as a member of the Serbian Progressive Party.

== Early life and career ==
Stojković was born in Belgrade, in what was then the Socialist Republic of Serbia in the Socialist Federal Republic of Yugoslavia. She is a graduate of the University of Belgrade Faculty of Political Sciences in the department of international relations; has co-ordinated local non-government organizations in the fields of democracy, human rights, youth policy, and entrepreneurship; and has been head of the information service in the Belgrade municipality of Rakovica.

== Politician ==
=== Municipal politics ===
Stojković joined the Progressive Party on its formation in 2009. She received the sixth position on the party's electoral list for the Rakovica municipal assembly in the 2012 Serbian local elections and was elected when the list won a plurality victory with seventeen out of fifty seats. She did not seek re-election in 2016.

She also received the fifty-first position on the Progressive Party's list for the City Assembly of Belgrade in 2012. The list won thirty-seven mandates and she was not returned. She was promoted to the thirteenth position in the 2014 Belgrade City Assembly election and was elected when the list won a majority victory with sixty-three mandates. She ultimately chose not to serve at the city level, resigning her mandate on 23 April 2014.

=== Parliamentarian ===
Stojković received the seventy-second position on the Progressive Party's Aleksandar Vučić — Future We Believe In electoral list for the 2014 Serbian parliamentary election and was elected when the list won a landslide victory with 158 out of 250 mandates. She was promoted to the thirty-ninth position on the successor Aleksandar Vučić — Serbia is winning list for the 2016 parliamentary election and was re-elected when the list won 131 mandates.

During the 2016–20 parliament, Stojković was a member of the assembly's foreign affairs committee, European integration committee, and committee on administrative, budgetary, mandate, and immunity issues; a deputy member of the foreign affairs committee; a deputy member of the European Union–Serbia stabilization and association parliamentary committee; a member of Serbia's delegation to the Parliamentary Assembly of the Organization for Security and Co-operation in Europe (OSCE PA); and a member of the parliamentary friendship groups with Austria, Bosnia and Herzegovina, France, Germany, Indonesia, the Netherlands, Norway, Slovenia, Uganda, and the United States of America.

She again received the thirty-ninth position on the Progressive Party's list in the 2020 Serbian parliamentary election and was elected to a third term when the list won a landslide majority with 188 mandates. She is now the deputy chair of the European integration committee, a member of the foreign affairs committee and Serbia's delegation to the OSCE PA, a deputy member of the stabilization and integration committee, the head of Serbia's parliamentary friendship group with Estonia, and a member of the friendship groups with Belgium, Bosnia and Herzegovina, Canada, China, France, Georgia, Germany, Greece, Japan, Montenegro, the Netherlands, Norway, Slovenia, and the United States of America.
