= Dalibor Radičević =

Serbian politician

Dalibor Radičević (Serbian Cyrillic: Далибор Радичевић; born 15 January 1976) is a politician in Serbia. He served in the National Assembly of Serbia from 2014 until 2020, when he became the mayor of Aleksinac. Radičević is a member of the Serbian Progressive Party.

== Private career ==
Radičević lives in Aleksinac and is a mechanical engineer in private life.

== Politician ==
=== Early municipal career ===
Radičević sought election to the Aleksinac municipal assembly in the 2008 Serbian local elections as a candidate of the far-right Serbian Radical Party, appearing in the thirty-ninth position on the party's electoral list. The list won the largest number of seats in the assembly, but Radičević was not selected for a mandate. (From 2000 to 2011, mandates in Serbian elections were awarded to sponsoring parties or coalitions rather than to individual candidates, and the mandates were often awarded out of numerical order. Radičević could have received a mandate irrespective of his list position, though in the event he did not.) He subsequently left the Radical Party to join the Progressives.

Following a 2011 electoral reform, mandates in Serbian elections were awarded in numerical order to successful candidates. Radičević received the sixteenth position on the Progressive Party's list in the 2012 Serbian local elections and was elected when the list won exactly sixteen mandates. His term in office was brief; he resigned on 9 August 2012 after being appointed as director of the public company Reč radnika ("Workers' Word").

He was given the second position on the Progressive Party's list in the 2016 local elections and was again elected to the municipal assembly when the list won twenty-four mandates. He resigned on 16 June 2016.

=== Parliamentarian ===
Radičević received the 127th position on the Progressive Party's Aleksandar Vučić — Future We Believe In list in the 2014 Serbian parliamentary election and elected when the list won a majority with 158 out of 250 mandates. He was given the 128th position on the successor Aleksandar Vučić – Serbia Is Winning list for the 2016 parliamentary election and was returned for a second term when the list won 131 seats.

During the 2016–20 parliament, he was a member of the assembly committee on spatial planning, transport, infrastructure, and telecommunications; a deputy member of the agriculture, forestry, and water management committee; a member of a subcommittee monitoring the agricultural situation in the marginal/most underdeveloped areas in Serbia; and a member of the parliamentary friendship groups with Australia, Austria, Belarus, Canada, China, Germany, Greece, Indonesia, Italy, Kazakhstan, Russia, Switzerland, and the United States of America.

He received the 181st position on the Progressive Party's Aleksandar Vučić — For Our Children list in the 2020 election and was re-elected when the list won a landslide majority with 188 mandates.

=== Mayor of Aleksinac ===
Radičević appeared in the lead position on the Progressive Party's list for Aleksinac in the 2020 Serbian local elections and was elected to a third municipal term when the list won a majority victory with twenty-seven out of forty-one mandates. He was subsequently chosen as mayor when the municipal assembly met in August 2020. By virtue of accepting an executive position in government, he was required to resign his seat in the National Assembly.
