= Mirko Krlić =

Serbian journalist and politician (born 1955)

Mirko Krlić (Serbian Cyrillic: Мирко Крлић; born 18 May 1955) is a journalist and politician in Serbia. He served in the National Assembly of Serbia from 2014 to 2020 as a member of the Serbian Progressive Party.

== Early life and career ==
Krlić was born in Zrenjanin, Vojvodina, in what was then the People's Republic of Serbia in the Federal People's Republic of Yugoslavia. He has been the editor-in-chief of several television programs on social and political issues, the editor-in-chief of the newspaper Zrenjanin, and the public relations manager for Jugoremedija. He has also been the marketing director of Servo Mihalj - Turist.

He was a candidate for the management board of Radio Television of Serbia in late 2020, although he did not receive the position.

== Politician ==
Krlić became president of the Progressive Party's information council in Zrenjanin on the party's formation in 2008 and has served as vice-president of the party committee in the city.

He received the 127th position on the Progressive Party's Let's Get Serbia Moving coalition electoral list in the 2012 Serbian parliamentary election. The list won seventy-three seats, and the Progressive Party subsequently formed a new coalition government with the Socialist Party of Serbia and other parties. Krlić was not elected, but he was appointed by the new administration as assistant director of the Office for Kosovo and Metohija. During his time in this office, he promoted the twinning of various municipalities in Central Serbia with their counterparts in Kosovo in bid to strengthen connections between the areas. He supported Kosovo Serb participation in the 2013 Kosovan local elections and called for the Community of Serb Municipalities to be established following the vote.

Krlić was promoted to the fifty-third position on the Progressive Party's Aleksandar Vučić — Future We Believe In list in the 2014 Serbian parliamentary election and was elected when the list won a landslide victory with 158 out of 250 mandates. He received the forty-sixth position on the successor Aleksandar Vučić – Serbia Is Winning list in the 2016 election and was again returned when the list won 131 mandates. In November 2017, he was chosen as chair of the assembly's culture and information committee. During this sitting of the assembly, he was also a member of the committee on Kosovo-Metohija, a member of a working group "for the collection of facts and evidence for the investigation of crimes committed against Serbs and other national communities in Kosovo-Metohija," and a member of the parliamentary friendship groups with Algeria, Argentina, Armenia, Australia, Austria, Belarus, Belgium, Bosnia and Herzegovina, Brazil, Bulgaria, Canada, China, Croatia, Cuba, Cyprus, the Czech Republic, Denmark, Finland, Germany, Greece, Hungary, India, Iran, Ireland, Israel, Italy, Japan, Lithuania, Luxembourg, Mexico, Montenegro, the Netherlands, North Macedonia, Norway, Poland, Romania, Russia, Slovenia, Spain, Sweden, Switzerland, Tunisia, Ukraine, the United Kingdom, and the United States of America.

In May 2020, the Zrenjanin basic court ruled that Krlić had verbally abused and physically attacked a journalist at a public event in the city two years earlier. He was ordered to pay three hundred thousand dinars. A misdemeanour court in the city subsequently found him guilty of having violated the public order and peace at the same event and ordered him to pay a fine of twenty-five thousand dinars. Krlić has denied the accusations against him.

He received the 241st position on the Progressive Party's Aleksandar Vučić — For Our Children list in the 2020 Serbian parliamentary election. This was too low a position for re-election to be a realistic prospect, and indeed he was not re-elected even as the list won a landslide majority with 188 mandates. It is possible, though unlikely, that Krlić could receive a mandate in the current sitting of the assembly as the replacement for another Progressive Party member.
