= Nenad Mitrović (Serbian Progressive Party politician) =

Serbian politician

Nenad Mitrović (Serbian Cyrillic: Ненад Митровић; born 1973) is a politician in Serbia. He is currently serving his fourth term in the National Assembly of Serbia. Previously a member of the far-right Serbian Radical Party, he now serves with the Serbian Progressive Party.

== Private career ==
Mitrović is an economist based in Bujanovac.

== Political career ==
=== Radical Party ===
Mitrović was given a position on the Radical Party's electoral list for the 2003 Serbian parliamentary election. The party won eight-two seats, becoming the largest single party in the assembly but falling well short of a majority and ultimately serving in opposition. Mitrović was not initially included in the party's assembly delegation but received a mandate on 17 February 2004, as the replacement for a party colleague who had been appointed to the federal Assembly of Serbia and Montenegro. (From 2000 to 2011, Serbian parliamentary mandates were awarded to sponsoring parties or coalitions rather than to individual candidates, and it was common practice for mandates to be awarded out of numerical order. Mitrović's position on the list had no bearing on whether or when he was appointed to the assembly.) He served in parliament for the next three years. He appeared on the Radical Party's list for the 2007 parliamentary election but was not included in its assembly delegation in the parliament that followed.

=== Progressive Party ===
The Radical Party experienced a serious split in 2008, with several members joining the breakaway Serbian Progressive Party under the leadership of Tomislav Nikolić and Aleksandar Vučić. Mitrović sided with the Progressives.

Serbia's electoral system was reformed in 2011, such that parliamentary mandates were awarded in numerical order to candidates on successful lists. Mitrović received the 148th position on the Progressive Party's Aleksandar Vučić — Future We Believe In coalition electoral list in the 2014 Serbian parliamentary election and was elected when the list won a majority with 158 out of 250 mandates. He was promoted to the 133rd position on the successor Aleksandar Vučić – Serbia Is Winning list in the 2016 election. He narrowly missed direct re-election when the list won a second consecutive majority with 131 seats, but was able to take his seat in the assembly on 10 August 2016, as a replacement for the author Ljiljana Habjanović Đurović, who had been elected on the Progressive list but declined her mandate.

During the 2016–20 parliament, Mitrović was a deputy member of the assembly's defence and internal affairs committee, the committee on the diaspora and Serbs in the region, and the committee on Kosovo-Metohija, as well as being a member of the parliamentary friendship groups with Belarus and Kazakhstan.

He received the 163rd position on the Progressive Party's Aleksandar Vučić — For Our Children list in the 2020 Serbian parliamentary election and was elected to a fourth term when the list won a landslide majority with 188 mandates. He is now a full member of the committee on Kosovo-Metohija, a deputy member of the defence and internal affairs committee and the security services control committee, and a member of the parliamentary friendship groups with Albania, the Bahamas, Botswana, Cameroon, the Central African Republic, Comoros, the Dominican Republic, Ecuador, Equatorial Guinea, Eritrea, Grenada, Guinea-Bissau, Jamaica, Kyrgyzstan, Laos, Liberia, Madagascar, Mali, Mauritius, Mozambique, Nauru, Nicaragua, Nigeria, Palau, Papua New Guinea, Paraguay, North Macedonia, the Republic of Congo, Saint Vincent and the Grenadines, Sao Tome and Principe, the Solomon Islands, South Sudan, Sri Lanka, Sudan, Suriname, Togo, Trinidad and Tobago, the United States of America, Uruguay, and Uzbekistan.

=== Municipal politics ===
Mitrović is the president of the Progressive Party's local organization in Bujanovac and has served a number of terms in its municipal assembly. He received the lead position on the party list in the 2016 local election and again in the 2020 local election and was elected on both occasions when the Progressives and their allies respectively won seven and ten out of forty-one mandates.

Following the 2020 election, a new municipal coalition government was formed exclusively by parties representing the local Albanian community. Mitrović was strongly opposed to this development and called for the formation of a multi-ethnic government.
