= Milena Ćorilić =

Serbian politician

Milena Ćorilić (Serbian Cyrillic: Милена Ћорилић; born 1944) is a politician in Serbia. She served in the National Assembly of Serbia from 2014 to 2020 as a member of the Party of United Pensioners of Serbia (PUPS).

== Early life and career ==
Ćorilić was born in Šabac, Serbia, at around the time that the city was liberated by the Yugoslav Partisans during World War II. She was raised in the reconstructed Yugoslavia following the war and trained as an economist.

== Political career ==
Ćorilić joined the United Pensioners either at the party's founding conference in 2005 or shortly thereafter. The United Pensioners contested the 2007 Serbian parliamentary election in an alliance with the Social Democratic Party, and Ćorilić received the twelfth position on the alliance's electoral list. The list did not win any mandates.

PUPS subsequently joined an electoral alliance led by the Socialist Party of Serbia for the 2008 parliamentary election. Ćorilić was given the 236th position on the list, which was largely arranged in alphabetical order, and she was not included in the PUPS delegation in the parliament that followed. (From 2000 to 2011, parliamentary mandates were awarded to sponsoring parties or coalitions rather than to individual candidates, and it was common practice for the mandates to be distributed out of numerical order. Ćorilić could have been awarded a mandate despite her low position on the list, though in fact she was not.) In 2011, she was chosen as a vice-president of PUPS.

Serbia's electoral system was reformed in 2011, such that parliamentary mandates were awarded in numerical order to candidates on successful lists. Ćorilić received the 158th position on the Socialist-led list in 2012 election; the list won forty-four mandates and she was not elected.

Ćorilić was promoted to the twenty-eighth position on the Socialist-led list for the 2014 election and was elected when the list again won forty-four mandates. For the 2016 election, PUPS formed a new alliance with the Serbian Progressive Party; Ćorilić was given the 117th position on the Progressive-led Aleksandar Vučić – Serbia Is Winning list and was re-elected when the list won 131 mandates. In the parliament that followed, she was a member of the committee on labour, social issues, social inclusion, and poverty reduction and the committee on the rights of the child; a deputy member of two other committees; and a member of the parliamentary friendship groups to Belarus, Kazakhstan, and Russia.
