= Sonja Vlahović =

Serbian politician

Sonja Vlahović (Serbian Cyrillic: Соња Влаховић; born 1969) is a politician in Serbia. She has served in the National Assembly of Serbia since 2014 as a member of the Serbian Progressive Party.

== Early life and career ==
Vlahović was born in Peć, Socialist Autonomous Province of Kosovo, in what was then the Socialist Republic of Serbia in the Socialist Federal Republic of Yugoslavia. She has a bachelor's degree as an economist and now lives in the Belgrade municipality of New Belgrade.

== Political career ==
Vlahović received the 117th position on the Progressive Party's Aleksandar Vučić — Future We Believe In electoral list for the 2014 Serbian parliamentary election and was elected when the list won a landslide victory with 158 out of 250 mandates. She was given the 111th position on the successor Aleksandar Vučić — Serbia Is Winning list for the 2016 parliamentary election and was re-elected when the list won 131 mandates. During the 2016–20 parliament, she was a member of the assembly's environmental protection committee and the committee on finance, state budget, and control of public spending; a deputy member of the committee on Kosovo-Metohija; and a member of the parliamentary friendship groups with Belarus, Cuba, India, Indonesia, Kazakhstan, Montenegro, Russia, and Uganda.

Vlahović received the 185th position on the Progressive Party's Aleksandar Vučić — For Our Children list for the 2020 election and was elected to a third term when the list won an increased majority with 188 mandates. She is now a member of the committee on finance, state budget, and control of public spending; a deputy member of the committee on the economy, regional development, trade, tourism, and energy; a deputy member of the committee on administrative, budgetary, mandate, and immunity issues; and a member of the parliamentary friendship groups with Canada, China, France, Germany, Italy, Russia, Slovenia, and Switzerland.
