= Tanja Tomašević Damnjanović =

Serbian politician

Tanja Tomašević Damnjanović (Serbian Cyrillic: Тања Томашевић Дамњановић; born 1982) is a politician in Serbia. She has served in the National Assembly of Serbia since 2014 as a member of the Serbian Progressive Party.

== Private career ==
Tomašević Damnjanović has a Bachelor of Laws degree. She lives in Vršac, Vojvodina.

== Political career ==
Tomašević Damnjanović received the 123rd position on the Progressive Party's Aleksandar Vučić — Future We Believe In electoral list for the 2014 Serbian parliamentary election and was elected when the list won a landslide victory with 158 out of 250 mandates. During her first term in parliament, she was the deputy chair of the committee on the judiciary, public administration, and local self-government, and was a deputy member of Serbia's delegation to the NATO Parliamentary Assembly (where Serbia has observer status). She also participated in a regional forum on judicial reform held in Budva, Montenegro, in June 2015, in which she advocated for Serbia's national strategy for improving the independence of the judiciary. She was promoted to the seventy-fifth position on the successor Aleksandar Vučić — Serbia is winning list for the 2016 parliamentary election and was re-elected when the list won 131 mandates.

She is currently a member of the assembly's committee on Kosovo-Metohija; a deputy member of the European integration committee, the environmental protection committee, and the committee on the judiciary, public administration, and local self-government; and a member of the parliamentary friendship groups with Belarus, France, Germany, India, Indonesia, Kazakhstan, Russia, Switzerland, and the United States of America.
