= Vladimir Petković (politician) =

Serbian politician

Vladimir Petković (Serbian Cyrillic: Владимир Петковић; born February 12, 1979) is a politician in Serbia. He has served in the National Assembly of Serbia since 2014 as a member of the Serbian Progressive Party.

== Private career ==
Petković is a mechanical engineering technician based in the Belgrade municipality of Barajevo.

== Political career ==
Petković was initially active with the far-right Serbian Radical Party. The Radicals experienced a significant split in late 2008, with many members joining the more centrist Progressive Party; Petković was among those who sided with the Progressives. He received the first position on an electoral list led by the Progressive Party for the 2012 municipal election in Barajevo and subsequently led the party's group in the municipal assembly. He was not a candidate in the 2016 local elections, although he remains the leader of the Progressive Party organization in the municipality.

Petković received the 124th position on the Progressive Party's Aleksandar Vučić — Future We Believe In electoral list for the 2014 Serbian parliamentary election and was elected when the list won a landslide victory with 158 out of 250 mandates. He was subsequently promoted to the 122nd position on the successor Aleksandar Vučić – Serbia Is Winning list in the 2016 parliamentary election and was re-elected when the list won a second consecutive majority with 131 seats.

He is currently a member of the assembly's environmental protection committee; a deputy member of the committee on Kosovo-Metohija and committee on spatial planning, transport, infrastructure, and telecommunications; and a member of Serbia's parliamentary friendship groups with Belarus, Cuba, Cyprus, Kazakhstan, Russia, and Venezuela.
