= Sanja Tucaković =

Serbian politician

Sanja Tucaković (Serbian Cyrillic: Сања Туцаковић; born 1973) is a politician in Serbia. She briefly served in the National Assembly of Serbia in 2014 and is now a member of the Kragujevac city government. Tucaković is a member of the Serbian Progressive Party.

== Early life and private career ==
Tucaković was born in Kragujevac, in what was then the Socialist Republic of Serbia in the Socialist Federal Republic of Yugoslavia. She has a bachelor's degree from the University of Kragujevac Faculty of Economics. From 2000 to 2013, she worked for Takovo Osiguranje a.d.o. Kragujevac, and from 2015 to 2020 she was a sector director for support and energy losses reduction in Kragujevac, Smederevo, and Požarevac.

== Politician ==
=== Municipal politics ===
Tucaković received the twelfth position on the Progressive Party's electoral list for the Kragujevac municipal assembly in the 2012 Serbian local elections and was elected when the list won eighteen mandates, finishing second against a coalition list led by the incumbent mayor Veroljub Stevanović. She served in the local assembly for the next four years and did not seek re-election in 2016.

She was appointed to the city council of Kragujevac after the 2020 Serbian local elections with responsibility for local government.

=== Parliamentarian ===
Tucaković was awarded the 165th position on the Progressive Party's Aleksandar Vučić — Future We Believe In list in the 2014 Serbian parliamentary election and narrowly missed direct election when the list won 158 out of 250 seats. She received a mandate on 10 May 2014 as the replacement for another party member and was briefly a member of the assembly, resigning on 12 June 2014. She was given the 192nd position on the Progressive Party's successor Aleksandar Vučić – Serbia Is Winning list in the 2016 parliamentary election and was not returned when the list won 131 mandates.
