= Zoran Milekić =

Serbian politician

Zoran Milekić (Serbian Cyrillic: Зоран Милекић; born 1955) is a politician in Serbia. He was president of the municipality (i.e. mayor) of Kučevo from 2004 to 2016 and has served in the National Assembly of Serbia since 2014 as a member of the Serbian Progressive Party.

== Private career ==
Milekić is a civil technician based in Kučevo.

== Political career ==
Milekić began his political career as a member of the far-right Serbian Radical Party but switched to the more centrist Progressives following a party split in 2008. He became mayor of Kučevo via a direct election in 2004 and was returned to the position following the municipal assembly elections of 2008 and 2012. He continues to serve as a member of the Kučevo municipal assembly as of 2018.

Milekić received the 103rd position on the Progressive Party's Aleksandar Vučić — Future We Believe In electoral list in the 2014 Serbian parliamentary election and was elected when the list won a landslide victory with 158 out of 250 mandates. He received the same position in the 2016 election and was re-elected when the list won a second consecutive majority with 131 mandates. Milekić is currently a member of the parliamentary committee on spatial planning, transport, infrastructure, and telecommunications, and a member Serbia's parliamentary friendship group with Russia.
