= Milosav Milojević =

Serbian politician

Milosav Milojević (Serbian Cyrillic: Милосав Милојевић; born 1954) is a politician in Serbia. He has served in the National Assembly of Serbia since 2014 as a member of the Serbian Progressive Party.

== Private life ==
Milojević is an electro-technician living in Aranđelovac.

== Politician ==
=== Municipal politics ===
Milojević was appointed to the Aranđelovac municipal council (i.e., the executive branch of the local government) in August 2012, when the Progressives formed a new coalition government at the local level. He served until 2014, with responsibility for urban affairs, infrastructure, and coordination of local communities.

He was given the third position on the Progressive Party's electoral list for the Aranđelovac municipal assembly in the 2014 Serbian local elections and was elected when the list won a majority victory with twenty-seven out of forty-one mandates. He was re-elected in the 2018 local elections when the Progressives and their allies won a second consecutive majority with twenty-six mandates.

=== Parliamentarian ===
Milojević received the 118th position on the Progressive Party's Aleksandar Vučić — Future We Believe In electoral list in the 2014 Serbian parliamentary election and was elected when the list won a majority victory with 158 out of 250 mandates. He was given the 109th position on the successor Aleksandar Vučić – Serbia Is Winning list in the 2016 election and was re-elected when the alliance won another majority with 131 seats. During the 2016–20 parliament, Milojević was a member of the parliamentary committee on human and minority rights and gender equality; a deputy member of the committee on the diaspora and Serbs in the region; and a member of the parliamentary friendship groups with Algeria, Argentina, Armenia, Australia, Austria, Azerbaijan, Belarus, Belgium, Bolivia, Bosnia and Herzegovina, Brazil, Bulgaria, Canada, China, Croatia, Cuba, Cyprus, the Czech Republic, Denmark, Egypt, Finland, France, Georgia, Germany, Greece, Hungary, India, Indonesia, Iran, Iraq, Ireland, Israel, Italy, Japan, Kazakhstan, Lithuania, Luxembourg, Mexico, Montenegro, the Netherlands, North Macedonia, Norway, Palestine, Poland, Romania, Russia, Slovenia, Spain, the countries of Sub-Saharan Africa, Sweden, Switzerland, Tunisia, Turkey, Ukraine, the United Kingdom, the United States of America, and Venezuela.

He received the 137th position on the Progressive Party's Aleksandar Vučić — For Our Children coalition list in the 2020 Serbian parliamentary election and was elected to a third term when the list won a landslide victory with 188 mandates. He is now a member of the committee on spatial planning, transport, infrastructure, and telecommunications; a deputy member of the committee on labour, social issues, social inclusion, and poverty reduction; and a member of the almost all the same parliamentary friendship groups as in the previous parliament, as well as those with Albania, Cambodia, Chile, Estonia, Ethiopia, Ghana, Guatemala, the Holy See, Kuwait, Lesotho, Malta, Moldova, Morocco, Nepal, North Korea, Pakistan, the Philippines, Portugal, Qatar, Saudi Arabia, Sierra Leone, Slovakia, South Africa, South Korea, Syria, Uganda, the United Arab Emirates, Vietnam, and Zambia.
