= Milan Đurica =

Serbian politician

Milan Đurica (Serbian Cyrillic: Милан Ђурица; born 20 June 1967) is a politician in Serbia, currently serving his second term in the National Assembly of Serbia. Đurica is a member of the Serbian Progressive Party.

== Private life ==
Đurica was born in Belgrade, in what was then the Socialist Republic of Serbia in the Socialist Federal Republic of Yugoslavia. He is the owner of the company Ekomes, which operates in the production and sale of barbecue meats. He and his business team developed a system of modulated cooling for refrigeration which won an award for best innovation in Serbia in 2017.

== Politician ==
=== Municipal politics ===
Đurica received the eighth position on the Progressive Party's electoral list for the New Belgrade municipal assembly in the 2012 Serbian local elections and was elected when the list won eighteen mandates. This election was won by the Democratic Party and its allies, and Đurica served in opposition. He did not seek re-election in 2016.

=== Parliamentarian ===
Đurica received the 145th position on the Progressive Party's Aleksandar Vučić — Future We Believe In list in the 2014 Serbian parliamentary election and was elected when the list won a landslide victory with 158 out of 250 mandates. For the next two years, he served in the assembly as a supporter of Vučić's administration. He was a member of the committee on the diaspora and Serbs in the region, and in late 2014 he took part in a parliamentary delegation to Albania that participated in financial negotiations and met with Serb communities in that country. He credited the visit with creating opportunities for improved business interactions and improved rights for Albania's minority communities. He was given the 179th position on the successor Aleksandar Vučić – Serbia Is Winning list in the 2016 election and was not re-elected when the list won 131 mandates.

Đurica received the 156th position on the Aleksandar Vučić — For Our Children list in the 2020 election and was elected for a second term when the list won 188 mandates. He is once again a member of the assembly committee on the diaspora and Serbs in the region, as well as being a deputy member of the agriculture, forestry, and water management committee; a deputy member of the committee on labour, social issues, social inclusion, and poverty reduction; and a member of Serbia's parliamentary friendship groups with Armenia, Australia, Austria, Brazil, Canada, Croatia, Cuba, the Czech Republic, France, Germany, Ireland, Italy, Kazakhstan, Luxembourg, Moldova, Nepal, Norway, Portugal, Qatar, Russia, Rwanda, Slovenia, Spain, Sweden, Switzerland, Uganda, Ukraine, the United Kingdom, and the United States of America.
