= Gorjana Marinković =

Serbian politician

Gorjana Marinković (Serbian Cyrillic: Горјана Маринковић; born 1990) is a politician in Serbia. She was a member of the National Assembly of Serbia from 2014 to 2016, serving with the Movement of Socialists (Pokret socijalista, PS).

== Early life and career ==
Mariniković was born in Stara Pazova, Vojvodina, Republic of Serbia, in what was then the Socialist Federal Republic of Yugoslavia. She has a degree in communication science.

== Politician ==
Marinković joined the main board of the PS in 2012 and has led its youth wing in Vojvodina.

Since 2012, the PS has been part of the Serbian Progressive Party's electoral coalition at the republic and provincial levels and in most Serbian municipalities. Marinković participated in the 2014 Serbian parliamentary election as a PS candidate, receiving the 249th position out of 250 on the Progressive-led Aleksandar Vučić – Future We Believe In electoral list. Direct election from this position was statistically impossible, and she was not elected even as the list won a majority victory with 158 out of 150 mandates.

She was awarded a mandate on 17 December 2014 as the replacement for PS delegate Aleksandar Jablanović, who had resigned to become a minister in the government of Kosovo; under Serbian law, assembly vacancies are filled by the next candidate from the same electoral list with an endorsement from the same party. In the assembly, Marinković served as a deputy member of the committee on education, science, technological development, and the information society. Once Marinković accepted her mandate, there were no further "reserve candidates" of the PS on the Progressive Party's list, and it was noted that, if another PS member left the assembly for any reason, they would be replaced the next-highest-ranked candidate on the list overall.

Marinković received the 238th position on the Progressive Party's successor Aleksandar Vučić – Serbia Is Winning list in the 2016 Serbian parliamentary election and was again not directly elected when the list won 131 mandates. On this occasion, she was not able to re-enter parliament as the replacement for another PS member.

As of 2021, Marinković is a member of the PS's executive board.
