= Mladen Lukić =

Serbian politician

Mladen Lukić (Serbian Cyrillic: Младен Лукић; born 1977) is a politician in Serbia. He has served in the National Assembly of Serbia on an almost continuous basis since 2014 as a member of the Serbian Progressive Party.

== Early life and career ==
Lukić was born in Bajina Bašta, in what was then the Socialist Republic of Serbia in the Socialist Federal Republic of Yugoslavia. He is a forestry engineer and has worked in the Tara National Park.

== Political career ==
Lukić became the leader of the local Progressive Party organization in Bajina Bašta at the time of the party's formation in 2008 and held this position until 2014. He was elected to the municipal assembly under the party's banner in 2012 and became a member of the municipal council in 2013, when the Progressive Party joined the local government.

He was given the 134th position on the Progressive Party's electoral list in the 2014 Serbian parliamentary election and was elected when the list won a landslide victory with 158 out of 250 mandates. For the 2016 election, he received the 137th list position. The list won 131 mandates, and he was not immediately re-elected. He was, however, able to re-take his seat in the assembly on 6 October 2016 as a replacement for Živko Vrcelj, who had resigned. He is currently a member of the parliamentary agriculture, forestry, and water management committee; a deputy member of the culture and information committee and the environmental protection committee; and a member of the parliamentary friendship groups with Indonesia and Syria.

Lukić was also re-elected to the municipal assembly of Bajina Bašta in the 2016 local elections and continues to serve as a member of this body.
