= Milena Bićanin =

Serbian politician

Milena Bićanin (Serbian Cyrillic: Милена Бићанин; born 1964) is a politician in Serbia. She has served in the National Assembly of Serbia since 2014 as a member of the Social Democratic Party of Serbia (SDPS) and has been the deputy leader of the party's parliamentary group throughout this time.

== Private career and early political career ==
Bićanin was born in Belgrade, then part of the Socialist Republic of Serbia in the Socialist Federal Republic of Yugoslavia. She is a professor of history, now based in Dobanovci in the Belgrade municipality of Surčin. Bićanin was the director of the Drinka Pavlović primary school for ten years, has served on the Belgrade city council, and in 2013 became president of the Belgrade board of the SDPS.

== Member of the National Assembly ==
Bićanin was first elected to the National Assembly in the 2014 Serbian parliamentary election. The SDPS contested this election as part of the Aleksandar Vučić — Future We Believe In alliance led by the Serbian Progressive Party; Bićanin received the thirtieth position on the alliance's electoral list and was declared elected when it won 158 out of 250 mandates. She was re-elected on the successor Aleksandar Vučić – Serbia Is Winning list in the 2016 election, in which the alliance won a second consecutive landslide victory. She is currently the deputy chair of the parliamentary committee on the rights of the child; a member of the committee on education, science, technological development and the information society; a deputy member of the health and family committee and the committee on labour, social issues, social inclusion and poverty reduction; and a member of the parliamentary friendship groups for Austria, Germany, Israel, and Switzerland. She oversaw the opening of a student parliament session in October 2016, in her capacity as deputy chair of the committee of the rights of the child.
