= Milan Latković =

Serbian medical doctor and politician

Milan Latković (Serbian Cyrillic: Милан Латковић; born 2 December 1949) is a Serbian medical doctor and politician. He has served two terms in the National Assembly of Serbia and one term in the Assembly of Vojvodina. Latković is a member of the Socialist Party of Serbia (SPS).

== Medicine career ==
Latković is a specialist surgeon. Prominent for many years in the political life of Sremska Mitrovica, he lived in the nearby village of Vitojevci in Ruma during his second national assembly term. He was appointed as acting director of the Sremska Mitrovica Health Center in August 2012 and was promoted to full director in December of the same year.

== Politician ==
=== 1990s ===
Latković was elected for Sremska Mitrovica's first division in the 1996 Vojvodina provincial election. The Socialist Party won a majority victory, and he served as a supporter of the administration.

The SPS contested the 1997 Serbian parliamentary election in an alliance with the Yugoslav Left (JUL) and New Democracy (ND). Latković appeared in the lead position on the coalition's electoral list for the Sremska Mitrovica division and was elected when the list won three out of eight seats. (From 1992 to 2000, Serbia's electoral law stipulated that one-third of parliamentary mandates would be awarded to candidates from successful lists in numerical order while the remaining two-thirds would be distributed amongst other candidates at the discretion of the sponsoring parties or alliances. Latković was automatically elected by virtue of his list position.) The SPS and its allies won the election, and Latković served as a government supporter at the republic level as well.

SPS leader Slobodan Milošević was defeated in the 2000 Yugoslavian presidential election, and the party fell from its formerly dominant position in Serbian politics. Latković did not seek re-election in the 2000 Serbian parliamentary election, and online sources do not indicate if he was a candidate in the 2000 Vojvodina provincial election.

=== Since 2000 ===
After taking some time away from political life, Latković once again became active with the Socialist Party in 2008. He ran for Sremska Mitrovica in the 2008 Vojvodina provincial election and was defeated. He also appeared on the SPS's list for Sremska Mitrovica in the concurrent 2008 Serbian local elections; the list did not cross the threshold for representation in the local assembly.

In 2011, Serbia's electoral laws were reformed so that all mandates were awarded in numerical order to candidates on successful lists. Latković was given the 110th position on the SPS's list in the 2012 parliamentary election. This was too low for election to be a realistic prospect, and he was not elected when the list won forty-four mandates. He led the SPS list for Sremska Mitrovica in the concurrent 2012 local elections and was elected when the list won seven mandates; he resigned his seat later in the year after being appointed as director of the city's health centre.

Latković received the thirty-first position on the SPS's coalition list in the 2014 parliamentary election and was elected to a second term in the national assembly when the list won forty-four mandates. The SPS participated in Serbia's coalition government after the election, and he once again served as a government supporter. In the 2014–16 parliament, he was a member of the health and family committee; a deputy member of the agriculture, forestry, and water management committee; and a member of the parliamentary friendship groups with Bosnia and Herzegovina, the Republic of Macedonia (now North Macedonia), Montenegro, and Poland. He was not a candidate in the 2016 parliamentary election.

He was re-elected to the Sremska Mitrovica city assembly in the 2016 and 2020 local elections. He resigned his seat on 18 December 2020.

== Electoral record ==
=== Provincial (Vojvodina) ===
2008 Vojvodina provincial election: Sremska Mitrovica
Candidate	Party	First round		Second round	
Candidate	Party	Votes	%	Votes	%
Goran Ivić	"For a European Vojvodina, Democratic Party–G17 Plus, Boris Tadić" (Affiliation: Democratic Party)	14,912	33.50	15,822	63.30
Dragan Vulin	Serbian Radical Party	10,279	23.09	9,173	36.70
Zoran Miščević	Democratic Party of Serbia–New Serbia–Vojislav Koštunica (Affiliation: Democratic Party of Serbia)	9,225	20.72		
Milan Latković	Socialist Party of Serbia (SPS) Party of United Pensioners of Serbia (PUPS) (Affiliation: Socialist Party of Serbia)	4,822	10.83		
Zoran Vasiljević	Liberal Democratic Party	3,116	7.00		
Miroljub Milić Bata	Together for Vojvodina–Nenad Čanak	1,554	3.49		
Ljubomir Samardžić	Citizens' Group: Yes for Mitrovica	611	1.37		
Total		44,519	100.00	24,995	100.00
Valid votes		44,519	96.48	24,995	98.29
Invalid/blank votes		1,626	3.52	435	1.71
Total votes		46,145	100.00	25,430	100.00

1996 Vojvodina provincial election: Sremska Mitrovica Division 1
Candidate	Party
Milan Latković (***WINNER***)	Socialist Party of Serbia
other candidates	
Total
