= Marjana Maraš =

Serbian politician

Marjana Maraš (Serbian Cyrillic: Марјана Мараш; born 1970) is a politician in Serbia. She has served in the National Assembly of Serbia since 2014 as a member of the Socialist Party of Serbia.

== Early life and private career ==
Maraš was born in Novi Sad, Vojvodina, in what was then the Socialist Republic of Serbia in the Socialist Federal Republic of Yugoslavia. She has a degree from the University of Novi Sad's Faculty of Medicine and is currently a graduate student at the same institution.

== Municipal and provincial politics ==
Maraš has served on the municipal assembly and the municipal council of Vrbas at different times and has been president of the assembly since the 2009 local elections.

She received the twenty-fifth position on the Socialist Party's electoral list in the 2008 Vojvodina provincial election and the thirtieth position in the 2012 provincial election. The party won three and nine seats by proportional representation in these elections, respectively, and she did not receive a mandate in the Assembly of Vojvodina on either occasion.

Maraš is a member of the Socialist Party's provincial committee for Vojvodina and secretary of the party's executive committee in Vrbas.

== Member of the National Assembly ==
Maraš first ran for the National Assembly in the 2012 Serbian parliamentary election, in which she received the eighty-first position on the Socialist Party's list. The list won forty-four mandates, and she did not receive a seat.

She was promoted to the twelfth position on the Socialist list in the 2014 election and was elected when, for the second consecutive time, the list won forty-four mandates. She was elected to a second term in the 2016 election, when she received the eleventh position and the list won twenty-nine mandates. The Socialist Party has been a part of Serbia's coalition government throughout Maraš's time in the assembly, and she has served as part of its parliamentary majority.

Maraš is currently a member of the assembly committee on human and minority rights and gender equality; a member of the committee on the diaspora and Serbs in the region; a member of the agriculture, forestry, and water management committee; a deputy member of the health and family committee and the committee on the judiciary, public administration, and local self-government; and a member of the parliamentary friendship groups with Argentina, Cuba, Malta, Montenegro, Russia, and the United States of America.
