= Olivera Pauljeskić =

Serbian politician

Olivera Pauljeskić (Serbian Cyrillic: Оливера Пауљескић; born 8 February 1971) is a politician in Serbia. She served in the National Assembly of Serbia from 2014 to 2016 and has been president (i.e., speaker) of the Žagubica municipal assembly since 2016. Pauljeskić is a member of the Serbian Progressive Party.

== Private career ==
Pauljeskić has a bachelor's degree in chemistry. She lives in Žagubica.

== Politician ==
Pauljeskić began her political career as a member of the far-right Serbian Radical Party and appeared on the party's electoral list in the 2007 Serbian parliamentary election. The party won eighty-one seats in this election. In this period, parliamentary mandates were assigned at the discretion of successful parties, and it was common practice for mandates to be awarded out of numerical order. Pauljeskić was given the 247th position out of 250 on the list; she could have been awarded a mandate despite her low list position, but she was not.

The Radical Party experienced a serious split in 2008, with several members joining the breakaway Serbian Progressive Party under the leadership of Tomislav Nikolić and Aleksandar Vučić. Pauljeskić was among those who sided with the Progressives.

Serbia's electoral system was reformed in 2011, such that mandates were awarded in numerical order to candidates on successful lists. Pauljeskić received the 147th position on the Progressive Party's Let's Get Serbia Moving list in the 2012 parliamentary election; the list won seventy-three seats, and she was not elected.

She was elected to the national assembly in the 2014 parliamentary election, in which she received the 141st position on the Progressive Party's Aleksandar Vučić — Future We Believe In list, which won a landslide majority with 158 mandates. For the next two years, she served in the assembly as a government supporter. She spoke in parliament once, in a discussion on amendments to Serbia's law on privatization. She was also a member of the Women's Parliamentary Network.

Pauljeskić was given the 153rd position on the Aleksandar Vučić – Serbia Is Winning list in the 2016 parliamentary election and missed re-election when the list won 131 mandates. In the 2020 parliamentary election, she was given the 215th position on the Aleksandar Vučić — For Our Children list, which won 188 mandates. It is possible, though unlikely, that she could re-enter parliament as the replacement for another Progressive Party member in the term of the current assembly.

=== Municipal politician ===
Pauljeskić has served a number of terms in the Žagubica municipal assembly. In the 2008 Serbian local elections, she appeared in the lead position on the Radical Party's local list. Following the split, she appeared in the lead position on the Progressive list in the 2012 Serbian local elections and was re-elected when the party won three seats. She served as deputy president of the assembly in the term that followed.

She was re-elected in the 2016 local elections after receiving the second list position; the list won a majority with seventeen out of thirty-three mandates. She was appointed as president of the assembly in May 2016.

Pauljeskić again received the second position on the Progressive list in the 2020 Serbian local elections and was again re-elected when it won twenty-two of twenty-five mandates in a reduced assembly. She continues to serve as president of the assembly.
