= Nikola Jolović (politician) =

Serbian politician

Nikola Jolović (Serbian Cyrillic: Никола Јоловић; born 13 July 1977) is a politician in Serbia. He has served in the National Assembly of Serbia since 2014 as a member of the Serbian Progressive Party.

== Early life and career ==
Jolović was born in Novi Pazar, in the Sandžak region of what was then the Socialist Republic of Serbia in the Socialist Federal Republic of Yugoslavia. Raised and educated in the city, he later earned a Bachelor of Economics degree from the University of Belgrade. He returned to Novi Pazar after his graduation and worked at P.P. Fiđoni.

== Politician ==
=== Municipal politics ===
Jolović was active in municipal politics prior to his election to the national assembly. He received the eighth position on the Progressive Party's coalition electoral list for the Novi Pazar municipal assembly in the 2012 Serbian local elections. The list won only two mandates, and he was not returned. This notwithstanding, he was chosen as deputy mayor of the city in June 2013, after the Progressives joined the local municipal coalition government. He served in this role until 2014, when he was required to stand down after becoming a member of the national assembly.

He became president of the party's board in Novi Pazar in December 2013. He was elected to the city assembly in the 2016 local elections and re-elected in the 2020 elections, in each case after receiving the lead position on the Progressive Party's coalition list; the list won five mandates in 2016 and six in 2020.

=== Parliamentarian ===
Jolović was given the 109th position on the Progressive Party's Aleksandar Vučić — Future We Believe In list for the 2014 Serbian parliamentary election and was elected when the list won a landslide victory with 158 out of 250 mandates. He was promoted to the seventy-third position on the successor Aleksandar Vučić – Serbia Is Winning list for the 2016 election and was re-elected when the list won a second consecutive majority with 131 mandates. During the 2016–20 parliament, he was a member of the committee on human and minority rights and gender equality and the committee on finance, state budget, and control of public spending, and a member of the parliamentary friendship groups with Germany, Italy, Russia, Syria, and the United States of America.

He received the 159th position on the Aleksandar Vučić — For Our Children list in the 2020 election and was elected for a third term when the list won a landslide majority with 188 mandates. He continues to serve on the finance committee and is now a deputy member of the human rights committee and the committee on spatial planning, transport, infrastructure, and telecommunications, as well as being a member of the parliamentary friendship groups with France, Germany, Italy, Russia, and the United States of America.
