= Aleksandra Đurović =

Serbian politician

- Александра Ђуровић
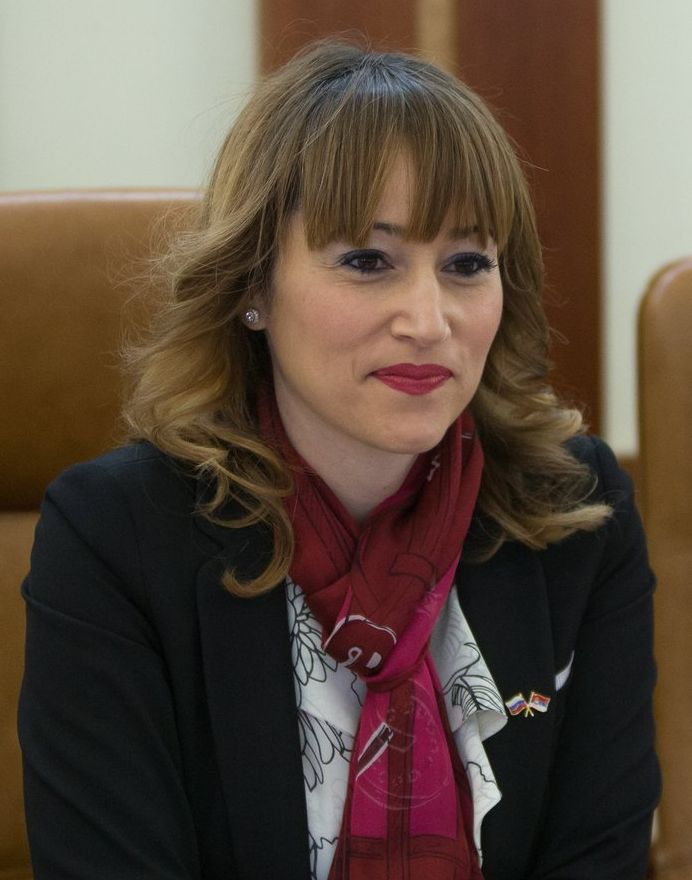

Personal details
- Born: May 19, 1976 (age 50) Sarajevo, Socialist Republic of Bosnia and Herzegovina, SFR Yugoslavia
- Party: SNS
- Profession: Politician

Aleksandra Đurović (Serbian Cyrillic: Александра Ђуровић; born May 19, 1976) is a politician and diplomat in Serbia. She served in the National Assembly of Serbia from 2012 to 2017 as a member of the Serbian Progressive Party and now serves as the head of Serbia's permanent mission to the Council of Europe.

== Private career ==
Đurović was born in Sarajevo, in what was then the Socialist Republic of Bosnia and Herzegovina in the Socialist Federal Republic of Yugoslavia. She attended the University of Belgrade Faculty of Economics and is a professor of the Serbian language. Subsequently, based in Belgrade, she was a founding member of the Progressive Party in 2008.

== Parliamentarian ==
Đurović received the thirtieth position on the Progressive Party's Let's Get Serbia Moving electoral list in the 2012 Serbian parliamentary election and was elected when the list won seventy-three mandates. She was re-elected in 2014 and 2016, in each case after receiving high positions on the Progressive Party's coalition list. The Progressive Party led Serbia's coalition government throughout Đurović's time in parliament, and she served as part of its parliamentary majority.

Đurović became a deputy member of Serbia's delegation to the Parliamentary Assembly of the Council of Europe (PACE) in 2012, serving as part of the European People's Party political group. She was promoted to leader of the delegation in 2013 and also became chair of the Serbian parliament's foreign affairs committee in 2014. In these roles, she played an active role in Serbia's international diplomacy via these positions and, among other things, worked to strengthen ties between Serbia and Russia. She called for the military conflict between Russia and Ukraine to be resolved by a negotiated settlement in 2014, and the following year she led Serbia's PACE delegation in unanimously rejecting a motion to deny Russian representatives the right to vote in the assembly as a result of the conflict. She also represented Serbia in diplomatic meetings with representatives from Belarus, Georgia, Romania, Bulgaria, Hungary, and other countries.

In December 2015, Đurović informed the Serbian parliament that twenty-six Serbian citizens had participated in the Syrian Civil War, of whom seven had returned to Serbia and eight of whom were deceased. She added that "those who have returned are under police surveillance," and that there was "no threat of terror attacks." In the same month, she remarked at a joint meeting of Russian and Serbian parliamentarians that "Serbia is militarily neutral and does not want to become a member of NATO," adding that only about twelve per cent of Serbian citizens support joining that alliance.

Following the 2016 election, Đurović became the vice-chair of the foreign affairs committee. She continued to serve as head of Serbia's PACE delegation; was a member of Serbia's committee on administrative, budgetary, mandate and immunity issues; led Serbia's parliamentary friendship delegation to Russia; and was a member of the parliamentary friendship delegations to Azerbaijan, China, Italy, Qatar, and Spain.

Đurović was selected as vice-president of the Parliamentary Assembly of the Council of Europe in January 2017. She was also a full member of PACE's committee on legal affairs and human rights and its committee on political affairs and democracy, chaired its subcommittee on external relations, and was a member or alternate member of other committees.

On August 2, 2017, Serbian president Aleksandar Vučić appointed Đurović as the head of Serbia's permanent mission to the Council of Europe. She formally resigned from the assembly on September 8, 2017.
