= Nadica Nikolić Tanasijević =

Serbian politician

Nadica Nikolić Tanasijević (Serbian Cyrillic: Надица Николић Танасијевић; born 1970) is a politician in Serbia. She served in the National Assembly of Serbia from 2014 to 2020 as a member of the Serbian Progressive Party.

== Private career ==
Nikolić Tanasijević is an archaeologist. She is from Ritopek, in the Belgrade municipality of Grocka.

== Politician ==
Nikolić Tanasijević received the 114th position on the Progressive Party's Aleksandar Vučić — Future We Believe In electoral list in the 2014 Serbian parliamentary election and was elected when the list won a majority victory with 158 out of 250 mandates. During her time in parliament, she was a deputy member of the committee on agriculture, forestry, and management; a deputy member of the culture and information committee; a deputy member of the committee for labour, social issues, social inclusion, and poverty reduction; and a member of the parliamentary friendship groups with France, Italy, Slovenia, Turkey, the United Kingdom.

She received the 230th position on the successor Aleksandar Vučić – Serbia Is Winning list in the 2016 Serbian parliamentary election. This was too low a position for re-election to be a realistic possibility, and indeed she was not re-elected even as the list won a second consecutive majority with 131 mandates.
