= Olivera Pešić =

Serbian politician

Olivera Pešić (Serbian Cyrillic: Оливера Пешић; born 1979) is a politician in Serbia. She has served in the National Assembly of Serbia since 2014 as a member of the Serbian Progressive Party.

== Early life and career ==
Pešić has a bachelor's degree as an economist and lives in Leskovac. She has been a deputy director of the city's economic development agency and the leader of a local team charged with ensuring recertification as a favourable business environment.

== Politician ==
=== Municipal politics ===
Pešić appeared on the electoral list of the far-right Serbian Radical Party in Leskovac for the 2008 Serbian local elections and served in the city assembly as a party representative. She left this sitting of the assembly prior to its dissolution.

The Radical Party experienced a serious split in late 2008, with several members joining the more moderate Progressive Party under the leadership of Tomislav Nikolić and Aleksandar Vučić. Pešić sided with the Progressives and appeared in the sixth position on the party's list in the 2012 local elections. She was elected when the list won eighteen mandates and served as leader of the Progressive Party's group in the city assembly. She did not seek re-election in 2016.

=== Parliamentarian ===
Pešić was awarded the seventy-eighth position on the Progressive Party's Aleksandar Vučić — Future We Believe In electoral list for the 2014 Serbian parliamentary election and was elected when the list won a landslide victory with 158 out of 250 mandates. She was subsequently promoted to the fifty-seventh position on the successor Aleksandar Vučić – Serbia Is Winning list in the 2016 parliamentary election and was re-elected when the list won 131 mandates. During the 2016–20 parliament, Pešić was a member of the assembly committee on finance, state budget, and control of public spending; a deputy member of the European integration committee and the committee on spatial planning, transport, infrastructure, and telecommunications; and a member of the parliamentary friendship groups with Austria, Belarus, India, Indonesia, Italy, Kazakhstan, Russia, and Spain.

She received the sixty-sixth position on the Progressive Party's Aleksandar Vučić — For Our Children list in the 2020 Serbian parliamentary election and was elected to a third term when the list won a landslide majority with 188 mandates. She remains a member of the finance committee, serves as a deputy member of the committee on human and minority rights and gender equality, and is a member of the parliamentary friendship groups with Austria, China, France, Italy, Russia, Spain, and the United Arab Emirates.
