= Žarko Bogatinović =

Serbian politician (born 1964)

Žarko Bogatinović (Serbian Cyrillic: Жарко Богатиновић; born 1964) is a politician in Serbia. He has served in the National Assembly of Serbia since 2014 as a member of the Serbian Progressive Party.

== Private career ==
Bogatinović was born in Leskovac, in what was then the Socialist Republic of Serbia in the Socialist Federal Republic of Yugoslavia. He still lives in the city and is an agricultural engineer. He was appointed as chair of the community's directorate for environmental protection in 2008 and 2012. In a 2014 interview, he indicated that he had worked for seventeen years at a public veterinary institution in the community.

== Politician ==
Bogatinović received the eighty-eighth position on the Progressive Party's Aleksandar Vučić — Future We Believe In electoral list in the 2014 parliamentary election and was elected to the assembly when the list won 158 out of 250 seats. He was promoted to the seventy-ninth position for the successor Aleksandar Vučić – Serbia Is Winning list for the 2016 election and was re-elected when the list won 131 seats. During the 2016–20 parliament, Bogatinović was a member of the environmental protection committee and the committee on agriculture, forestry, and water management; a deputy member of the committee on administrative, budgetary, mandate, and immunity issues; a member of a sub-committee for monitoring the agricultural situation in the marginal and most under-developed areas of Serbia; and a member of the parliamentary friendship groups for Austria, Belarus, Indonesia, Kazakhstan, Russia, and Turkey.

He received the 108th position on the Progressive Party's Aleksandar Vučić — For Our Children list in the 2020 election and was elected to a third term when the list won a landslide majority with 188 mandates. He is now the deputy chair of the environmental protection committee, a member of the agriculture committee, a deputy member of the committee on Kosovo-Metohija, and a member of the friendship groups with Austria, the Bahamas, Botswana, Cameroon, the Central African Republic, China, Comoros, the Dominican Republic, Ecuador, Equatorial Guinea, Eritrea, Greece, Grenada, Guinea-Bissau, Jamaica, Kyrgyzstan, Laos, Liberia, Madagascar, Mali, Mauritius, Mozambique, Nauru, Nicaragua, Nigeria, Palau, Papua New Guinea, Paraguay, the Republic of Congo, Saint Vincent and the Grenadines, Sao Tome and Principe, the Solomon Islands, South Sudan, Sri Lanka, Sudan, Suriname, Togo, Trinidad and Tobago, Turkey, Uruguay, and Uzbekistan.
