= Željko Sušec =

Serbian politician (born 1977)

Željko Sušec (Serbian Cyrillic: Жељко Сушец; born 24 June 1977) is a politician in Serbia. He served in the National Assembly of Serbia from 2012 to 2018 as a member of the Serbian Progressive Party and is currently a member of the Pančevo municipal assembly.

== Early life and career ==
Sušec was born in Pančevo, Vojvodina, then part of the Socialist Republic of Serbia in the Socialist Federal Republic of Yugoslavia. He is an educational worker in private life, teaching at the economic school Paja Marganović.

== Political career ==
Sušec has served on the Progressive Party's Vojvodina provincial council. He received the seventy-seventh position on the party's Let's Get Serbia Moving electoral list in the 2012 Serbian parliamentary election. The list won seventy-three mandates, and he was not initially elected. He was, however, awarded a mandate on 21 July 2012 as the replacement for another party member further up the list who had resigned. The Progressives formed a coalition government with the Socialist Party of Serbia and other parties after the election, and Sušec served in the assembly as a supporter of the administration.

He again received the seventy-seventh position on the Progressive-led electoral list in the 2014 parliamentary election and the forty-first position in the 2016 election and was re-elected both times when the lists won majority victories, respectively with 158 and 131 mandates (out of 250).

On 15 May 2018, Sušec asked Serbia's Security Intelligence Agency if it could verify whether opposition parliamentarian Marinika Tepić had connections with "foreign agencies" or "foreign service agents" who were seeking to destabilize Serbia. Tepić responded by publicly accusing Sušec of corruption, stating that the indebted Apoteka Pančevo agency had spent the equivalent of about 40.000 Euros on items from a craft shop operated by Sušec's mother and asking the ministry of internal affairs if it was familiar with this situation. Sušec unexpectedly resigned from the assembly shortly thereafter, on 4 June 2018. Radio Television of Vojvodina reported on these events with an article entitled, "Political Boomerang," and Tepić speculated that the Progressive Party had forced Sušec's resignation.

Sušec was also elected to the Pančevo municipal assembly in the 2016 local elections and has served as leader of the Progressive Party group in that body. He continues to serve in the local assembly as of 2018.
