= Ljubica Mrdaković Todorović =

Serbian politician

Ljubica Mrdaković Todorović (Serbian Cyrillic: Љубица Мрдаковић Тодоровић; born August 9, 1962) is a medical doctor and politician in Serbia. She has served in the National Assembly of Serbia since 2012 as a member of the Serbian Progressive Party.

== Early life and private career ==
Mrdaković Todorović has a master's degree from the University of Niš Faculty of Medicine, where she specialized in gynecology and obstetrics. She lives in Niš, has served for many years as chief of the department of gynecology at the Niš Health Centre, and has advised the institution on organizational and medical issues. In 2014, she was appointed as chair of the supervisory board of the "Dr. Laza Lazarević" Clinic for Psychiatric Diseases in Belgrade.

== Political career ==
Mrdaković Todorović received the sixty-third position on the Progressive Party's Let's Get Serbia Moving electoral list in the 2012 Serbian parliamentary election and was elected when the list won seventy-three mandates. The Progressive Party emerged as the dominant party in a new coalition government after the election, and Mrdaković Todorović served as part of its parliamentary majority. She was returned to the assembly in the elections in the 2014 and 2016, both of which were easily won by the Progressive Party and its allies. She is currently the deputy chair of the assembly's health and family committee, the leader of its parliamentary friendship group with South Korea, and a member of its parliamentary friendship groups with Belarus, Cuba, Kazakhstan, and Russia.
