= Ljubiša Stojmirović =

Serbian politician (born 1950)

Ljubiša Stojmirović (Serbian Cyrillic: Љубиша Стојмировић; born 11 September 1950) is a politician in Serbia. He has served several terms in the National Assembly of Serbia. Formerly a member of the far-right Serbian Radical Party, he has been a member of the Serbian Progressive Party since its founding in 2008.

== Early life and career ==
Stojmirović was born in Belgrade, in what was then the People's Republic of Serbia in the Federal People's Republic of Yugoslavia. He received a bachelor's degree from the University of Belgrade Faculty of Organizational Sciences in 1978, focusing on organizational cybernetics. He subsequently received a master's degree from the same institution in 1980 and a Ph.D. from the Faculty of Mathematics in 1998. Stojmirović taught at the Central Economic School in Grocka from 1982 to 1985, worked for a time at the maritime agency Jugoagent, began teaching at the Belgrade Business School in 2000, and became a full professor at the latter institution in 2005. He is now retired and divides his time between Belgrade and Crna Trava.

== Political career ==
=== Radical Party ===
==== The Milošević years (1991–2000) ====
Stojmirović joined the Radical Party in 1991, the year of the party's formation, and was a frequent candidate for public office in the 1990s. He sought election to the Yugoslavian federal assembly's Chamber of Citizens in the May 1992 federal election in the single-member constituency of Mladenovac and finished second against Radivoje Jovanović of the Socialist Party of Serbia.

He subsequently received the eighteenth position on the Radical Party's electoral list for the Belgrade division in the 1992 Serbian parliamentary election and the fourteenth position in the same division in the 1993 parliamentary election. The Radicals won twelve seats in Belgrade in 1992 and seven in 1993; Stojmirović was not selected for its assembly delegation on either occasion. (From 1992 to 2000, Serbia's electoral law stipulated that one-third of parliamentary mandates would be assigned to candidates from successful lists in numerical order, while the remaining two-thirds would be distributed by the sponsoring parties amongst other candidates. It was common practice for the latter mandates to be awarded out of numerical order. Stojmirović could have been awarded a mandate on either occasion despite his relatively low position, but he was not.)

He received the second position on the Radical Party's list for the Voždovac division in the 1996 Yugoslavian parliamentary election. The Radicals won only one seat in the division, and he was again not elected.

For the 1997 Serbian parliamentary election, Stojmirović received the eighth position on the Radical Party's list for the Čukarica division in Belgrade. The party won four mandates in the division, and on this occasion he was included in its assembly delegation, serving his first term in parliament. The election was won by the Socialist Party of Serbia and its allies. The Radicals initially served in opposition, although from 1998 to 2000 the party participated in a coalition government with the Socialists and the Yugoslav Left. After the fall of Slobodan Milošević's administration in October 2000, a new transitional government was established that excluded the Radicals, and the party returned to opposition.

Stojmirović ran in Zvezdara's ninth constituency for the City Assembly of Belgrade in the 2000 Serbian local elections. He lost to Dragan Šutanovac of the Democratic Opposition of Serbia.

==== After the fall of Milošević (2000–08) ====
Serbia's electoral system was reformed prior to the 2000 Serbian parliamentary election, with the entire country becoming a single electoral constituency and parliamentary mandates being awarded to listed candidates at the discretion of successful parties, without any specific reference to numerical order. Stojmirović was included on the Radical Party's list in 2000. The party won twenty-three seats, and he was not included in its assembly delegation.

He was elected to both the Belgrade city assembly and the Zvezdara municipal assembly in the 2004 Serbian local elections, leading the Radical Party's list in the latter jurisdiction. He was president (i.e., mayor) of Zvezdara from February to June 2005, in the context of a local alliance with the Democratic Party of Serbia, the Socialists, and other parties. He also sought election as chair of the Assembly of the City of Belgrade in November 2007, although he was not successful.

He was included on the Radical Party's electoral lists in the 2007 and 2008 parliamentary elections, though he was not included in its assembly delegation on either occasion. He was also included on the Radical Party's list for the Belgrade city assembly and again held the lead position on the party's list for the Zvezdara municipal assembly in the 2008 Serbian local elections, but he did not take a seat at either level.

=== Progressive Party ===
The Radical Party experienced a serious split in late 2008, with several of its members joining the more moderate Serbian Progressive Party under the leadership of Tomislav Nikolić and Aleksandar Vučić. Stojmirović sided with the Progressives.

Serbia's electoral system was reformed once again in 2011, such that parliamentary mandates were awarded in numerical order to candidates on successful lists. Stojmirović received the thirty-fourth position on the Progressive Party's Let's Get Serbia Moving list for the 2012 parliamentary election and was elected when the list won seventy-three mandates. The Progressives formed a new coalition government with the Socialists and other parties after the election, and Stojmirović served as a government supporter. He was re-elected in the 2014 and 2016 elections, in which the Progressive-led lists won landslide victories.

During the 2016–20 parliament, Stojmirović was the deputy chair of the assembly's committee on education, science, technological development, and the information society; a member of the foreign affairs committee and of the European Union–Serbia stabilization and association parliamentary committee; the head of Serbia's delegation to the Parliamentary Assembly of the Central European Initiative; the head of Serbia's parliamentary friendship group with Cuba; and a member of the parliamentary friendship groups with Albania, Algeria, Angola, Armenia, Azerbaijan, Bahrain, Belarus, Bhutan, Bosnia and Herzegovina, Chile, China, Djibouti, El Salvador, Ethiopia, Fiji, The Gambia, Georgia, Ghana, Guyana, Israel, Kazakhstan, Kuwait, Latvia, Lesotho, Malawi, Micronesia, Moldova, Nepal, North Macedonia, Oman, the Philippines, Russia, Sierra Leone, Tajikistan, Tunisia, Turkey, Turkmenistan, Vietnam, Zambia, and Zimbabwe.

He received the fifty-sixth position on the Progressive Party's Aleksandar Vučić — For Our Children electoral list in the 2020 parliamentary election and was elected to a fifth term when the list won a landslide victory with 188 mandates. He continues to serve on the education and science committee and is a member of the subcommittee on the information society and digitalization, a deputy member of the stabilization and association committee, and a deputy member of the committee on the diaspora and Serbs in the region. He is still the leader of Serbia's friendship group with Cuba and is a member of the friendship groups with Albania, Algeria, Angola, Argentina, Armenia, Australia, Austria, Azerbaijan, Bahrain, Belarus, Belgium, Bhutan, Bolivia, Bosnia and Herzegovina, Brazil, Bulgaria, Burundi, Cambodia, Canada, Cape Verde, Chile, China, Croatia, Cyprus, the Czech Republic, Democratic Republic of the Congo, Denmark, Djibouti, Egypt, El Salvador, Ethiopia, Fiji, Finland, France, The Gambia, Georgia, Germany, Ghana, Greece, Guatemala, Guyana, the Holy See, Hungary, India, Indonesia, Iran, Iraq, Ireland, Israel, Italy, Japan, Jordan, Kazakhstan, Kenya, Kuwait, Latvia, Lesotho, Liechtenstein, Luxembourg, Malawi, Malta, Mexico, Micronesia, Moldova, Montenegro, Morocco, Myanmar, Namibia, Nepal, the Netherlands, North Korea, North Macedonia, Norway, Oman, Palestine, Pakistan, Peru, the Philippines, Poland, Portugal, Qatar, Romania, Russia, Rwanda, Saudi Arabia, Sierra Leone, Slovakia, Slovenia, South Africa, South Korea, the Sovereign Military Order of Malta, Spain, Sweden, Switzerland, the countries of Sub-Saharan Africa, Syria, Tajikistan, Tunisia, Turkey, Turkmenistan, Uganda, Ukraine, the United Arab Emirates, the United Kingdom, the United States of America, Venezuela, Vietnam, Zambia, and Zimbabwe.

== Electoral record ==
=== Federal (FR Yugoslavia) ===
May 1992 Yugoslavian federal election: Mladenovac
Candidate	Party	Votes	%
Radivoje Jovanović	Socialist Party of Serbia	25,224	46.71
Ljubiša Stojmirović	Serbian Radical Party	17,914	33.17
Radivoje Jašić	League of Communists – Movement for Yugoslavia	5,959	11.03
Predrag Kovačević	Citizens' Group	4,904	9.08
Total		54,001	100.00

=== Municipal (City Assembly of Belgrade) ===
2000 City of Belgrade election Zvezdara Division IX
Aleksandar Antić	Socialist Party of Serbia–Yugoslav Left	
Milorad Dimić	Serbian Renewal Movement	
Ljubiša Stojmirović	Serbian Radical Party	
Dušan Tanić	Radical Party of Serbia	
Dragan Šutanovac	Democratic Opposition of Serbia	elected
