= List of members of the National Assembly of Serbia, 2012–2014 =

== MNAs by party ==
Name	Abbr.	Leader	Ideology	Political position	MPs	Gov′t
Serbian Progressive Party; Српска напредна странка Srpska napredna stranka	SNS	Aleksandar Vučić	National conservatism Right-wing populism	Centre-right	58 / 250	G
Democratic Party; Демократска странка Demokratska stranka	DS	Dragan Đilas	Social democracy Social liberalism	Centre to centre-left	49 / 250	O
Socialist Party of Serbia; Социјалистичка партија Србије; Socjalistička partija Srbje	SPS	Ivica Dačić	Democratic socialism Left-wing populism	Centre-left	25 / 250	G
Democratic Party of Serbia; Демократска странка Србије; Demokratska stranka Srbije	DSS	Vojislav Koštunica	National conservatism Christian democracy	Right-wing	21 / 250	O
United Regions of Serbia; Уједињени региони Србије; Ujedinjeni regioni Srbije	URS	Mlađan Dinkić	Liberal conservatism Regionalism	Centre to centre-right	16 / 250	G
Liberal Democratic Party; Либерално-демократска партија Liberalno-demokratska partija	LDP	Čedomir Jovanović	Liberalism; Atlanticism	Centrism	12 / 250	O
Party of United Pensioners of Serbia; Партија уједињених пензионера Србије; Partija ujedinjenih penzionera Srbije	PUPS	Jovan Krkobabić	Pensioners' interests Pro-Europeanism	Single-issue	12 / 250	G
Social Democratic Party of Serbia; Социјалдемократска партија Србије; Socijaldemokratska partija Srbije	SDPS	Rasim Ljajić	Social democracy Pro-Europeanism	Centre-left	9 / 250	G
New Serbia; Нова Србија; Nova Srbija	NS	Velimir Ilić	Right-wing populism Monarchism	Right-wing	8 / 250	G
United Serbia; Јединствена Србија; Jedinstvena Srbija	JS	Dragan Marković	Serbian nationalism National conservatism	Right-wing	7 / 250	S
League of Social Democrats of Vojvodina; Лига социјалдемократа Војводине; Liga socijaldemokrata Vojvodine	LSV	Nenad Čanak	Social democracy Regionalism	Centre-left	5 / 250	O
Alliance of Vojvodina Hungarians; Савез војвођанских Мађара; Savez vojvođanskih Mađara	SVM	István Pásztor	Hungarian minority politics Conservatism	Centre-right	6 / 250	S
Serbian Renewal Movement; Српски покрет обнове Srpski pokret obnove	SPO	Vuk Drašković	Monarchism; Atlanticism	Centre-right	4 / 250	O
Movement of Socialists; Покрет социјалиста Pokret socijalista	PS	Aleksandar Vulin	Left-wing nationalism Euroscepticism	Left-wing	2 / 250	G
Party of Democratic Action of Sandžak; Странка демократске акције Санџака; Stranka demokratske akcije Sandžaka	SDA S	Sulejman Ugljanin	Bosniak minority politics Bosniak nationalism	Right-wing	2 / 250	O
Strength of Serbia Movement; Покрет снага Србије; Pokret snaga Srbije	PSS	Milanka Karić	Conservatism; Pro-Europeanism	Centre-right	2 / 250	S
Party for Democratic Action; Партија за демократско деловање Partija za demokratsko delovanje	PDD	Riza Halimi	Albanian minority politics Regionalism	Right-wing	2 / 250	O
Christian Democratic Party of Serbia; Демохришћанска странка Србије; Demohrišćanska stranka Srbije	DHSS	Olgica Batić	Christian democracy Atlanticism	Centre to Centre-right	1 / 250	S
Greens of Serbia; Зелени Србије; Zeleni Srbije	ZS	Ivan Karić	Green politics Pro-Europeanism	Centre-left	1 / 250	O

This is a list of the 250 members of the 2012–2014 National Assembly of Serbia, as well as a list of former members of the 2012–2014 National Assembly.

The 2012–2014 National Assembly was elected in the 2012 parliamentary election, and it held its first session on 31 May 2012. The 2012–2014 National Assembly was the 9th assembly since the reestablishment of the multi-party system, after the 1990 parliamentary election.

== List of members at the conclusion of the 9th National Assembly ==
Name	Political Party	Place of living	Year of birth
Irena Aleksić	Serbian Progressive Party	Kraljevo	1978
Miloš Aligrudić	Democratic Party of Serbia	Belgrade	1964
Dragan Andrić	League of Social Democrats of Vojvodina	Subotica	1975
Ivan Andrić	Liberal Democratic Party	Belgrade	1974
Zoran Anđelković	Socialist Party of Serbia	Belgrade	1958
Zoran Antić	Serbian Progressive Party	Jagodina	1962
Konstantin Arsenović; Vice-President of the National Assembly	Party of United Pensioners of Serbia	Belgrade	1940
Veroljub Arsić	Serbian Progressive Party	Požarevac	1969
Marko Atlagić	Serbian Progressive Party	Belgrade	1949
Nevena Adžemović	New Serbia	Belgrade	1982
Zoran Babić	Serbian Progressive Party	Vrnjačka Banja	1971
Dušan Bajatović	Socialist Party of Serbia	Novi Sad	1967
Donka Banović	Democratic Party of Serbia	Dimitrovgrad	1963
Olgica Batić	Christian Democratic Party of Serbia	Obrenovac	1981
Ivan Bauer	Social Democratic Party of Serbia	Belgrade	1967
Nebojša Berić	Serbian Progressive Party	Sombor	1972
Igor Bečić	Serbian Progressive Party	Vrbas	1971
Branislav Blažić	Serbian Progressive Party	Belgrade	1957
Goran Bogdanović	Democratic Party	Lešak	1963
Snežana Bogosavljević Bošković	Socialist Party of Serbia	Čačak	1964
Bojana Božanić	Democratic Party of Serbia	Čajetina	1981
Balša Božović	Democratic Party	Belgrade	1983
Zoran Bojanić	Serbian Progressive Party	Kraljevo	1959
Jelena Budimirović	Serbian Progressive Party	Martinci	1985
Svetislava Bulajić	Liberal Democratic Party	Belgrade	1985
Laslo Varga	Alliance of Vojvodina Hungarians	Palić	1976
Zoran Vasić	United Serbia	Jagodina	1962
Slobodan Veličković	Party of United Pensioners of Serbia	Grdelica	1947
Janko Veselinović	Democratic Party	Novi Sad	1965
Maja Videnović	Democratic Party	Belgrade	1979
Katica Vijuk	Serbian Progressive Party	Šid	1968
Slavoljub Vlajković	Socialist Party of Serbia	Niš	1953
Teodora Vlahović	Democratic Party	Novi Sad	1953
Milica Vojić-Marković	Democratic Party of Serbia	Valjevo	1959
Vojislav Vujić	United Serbia	Vrnjačka Banja	1975
Irena Vujović	Serbian Progressive Party	Belgrade	1983
Dijana Vukomanović	Socialist Party of Serbia	Belgrade	1967
Nataša Vučković	Democratic Party	Belgrade	1967
Gorica Gajić	Democratic Party of Serbia	Svilajnac	1958
Bajro Gegić	Party of Democratic Action of Sandžak	Tutin	1954
Radmila Gerov	Liberal Democratic Party	Negotin	1967
Ninoslav Girić	Serbian Progressive Party	Leskovac	1955
Branko Gogić	Social Democratic Party of Serbia	Belgrade	1977
Žika Gojković	Serbian Renewal Movement	Sombor	1972
Maja Gojković	Serbian Progressive Party	Novi Sad	1963
Vladimir Gordić	Democratic Party	Sevojno	1963
Suzana Grubješić	G17 Plus	Belgrade	1963
Mladen Grujić	New Serbia	Belgrade	1966
Miljenko Dereta	Liberal Democratic Party	Belgrade	1950
Ivana Dinić	Socialist Party of Serbia	Niš	1985
Mlađan Dinkić	G17 Plus	Belgrade	1964
Mirjana Dragaš	Socialist Party of Serbia	New Belgrade	1950
Srđan Dragojević	Socialist Party of Serbia	Belgrade	1963
Zlatko Dragosavljević	Together for Serbia	Resavica	1967
Milovan Drecun	Serbian Progressive Party	New Belgrade	1957
Milica Dronjak	Party of United Pensioners of Serbia	Stara Pazova, Surduk	1943
Saša Dujović	Movement of Veterans	Zemun	1966
Božidar Đelić	Democratic Party	Belgrade	1965
Zlata Đerić	New Serbia	Sombor	1958
Miodrag Đidić	Together for Serbia	Kruševac	1954
Bojana Đorđević	Socialist Party of Serbia	Kruševac	1976
Dragana Đuković	G17 Plus	Sremska Kamenica	1980
Bojan Đurić	Liberal Democratic Party	Zemun	1978
Aleksandra Đurović	Serbian Progressive Party	Belgrade	1976
Emir Elfić	Bosniak Democratic Union	Novi Pazar	1977
Milinko Živković	Serbian Progressive Party	Bor	1960
Stefan Zankov	Serbian Progressive Party	Zaječar	1976
Nebojša Zelenović	Together for Serbia	Šabac	1975
Ružica Igić	Democratic Party of Serbia	Novi Sad	1957
Vladimir Ilić	G17 Plus	Požarevac	1963
Biljana Ilić Stošić	Serbian Progressive Party	Kragujevac	1964
Enis Imamović	Independent	Novi Pazar	1984
Bojan Jakovljević	Serbian Progressive Party	Leposavić	1963
Marko Jakšić	Democratic Party of Serbia	Kosovska Mitrovica	1951
Milanka Jevtović Vukojičić	Serbian Progressive Party	Priboj	1960
Vuk Jeremić	Independent	Belgrade	1975
Slobodan Jeremić	Party of United Pensioners of Serbia	Rudine	1949
Sanja Jefić Branković	Independent	Niš	1984
Vladimir Jovanović	Democratic Party	Prokuplje	1973
Ivan Jovanović	Democratic Party	Kraljevo	1977
Nikola Jovanović	Together for Šumadija	Trstenik	1948
Čedomir Jovanović	Liberal Democratic Party	Belgrade	1971
Vesna Jovicki	Socialist Party of Serbia	Bačka Palanka	1964
Ivan Joković	I Live for Krajina	Zaječar	1961
Jadranka Joksimović	Serbian Progressive Party	Belgrade	1978
Jovana Joksimović	Democratic Party	Belgrade	1987
Aleksandar Jugović	Serbian Renewal Movement	Čačak	1975
Verica Kalanović	G17 Plus	Trstenik	1954
Branka Karavidić	Democratic Party	Majdanpek	1958
Dragomir Karić	Strength of Serbia Movement	Belgrade	1949
Ivan Karić	Greens of Serbia	Obrenovac	1975
Milanka Karić	Strength of Serbia Movement	Belgrade	1957
Zoran Kasalović	Socialist Party of Serbia	Žitište	1967
Nenad Kitanović	G17 Plus	Doljevac	1968
Oto Kišmarton	Serbian Progressive Party	Kikinda	1962
Milan Knežević	Serbian Progressive Party	Kragujevac	1952
Vesna Kovač; Vice-President of the National Assembly	G17 Plus	Belgrade	1965
Elvira Kovács	Alliance of Vojvodina Hungarians	Mihajlovo	1982
Borisav Kovačević	Party of United Pensioners of Serbia	Belgrade	1943
Milan Kovačević	Serbian Progressive Party	Sremska Mitrovica	1962
Siniša Kovačević	Democratic Party of Serbia	Sremska Mitrovica	1954
Nada Kolundžija	Democratic Party	Belgrade	1952
Radoslav Komlenović	United Serbia	Kruševac	1964
Nenad Konstantinović	Democratic Party	Belgrade	1973
Žarko Korać; Vice-President of the National Assembly	Social Democratic Union	Belgrade	1947
Đorđe Kosanić	United Serbia	Kragujevac	1967
Mirna Kosanović	Social Democratic Party of Serbia	Belgrade	1953
Radmilo Kostić	Serbian Progressive Party	Pirot	1971
Bojan Kostreš	League of Social Democrats of Vojvodina	Ečka	1974
Branislav Krekić	Democratic Party	Belgrade	1983
Milan Krkobabić	Party of United Pensioners of Serbia	Novi Beograd	1952
Petar Kuntić	Democratic Alliance of Croats in Vojvodina	Subotica	1960
Siniša Lazić	Democratic Party	Sombor	1967
Milan Lapčević	Democratic Party of Serbia	Niš	1969
Miodrag Linta	Coalition of Refugee Associations in the Republic of Serbia	Belgrade	1969
Ljiljana Lučić	Democratic Party	Belgrade	1953
Saša Maksimović	Serbian Progressive Party	Novi Bečej	1976
Vladimir Marinković	Social Democratic Party of Serbia	Ostružnica	1976
Vesna Marjanović	Democratic Party	Belgrade	1969
Mirjana Marjanović	Serbian Progressive Party	Surčin, Boljevci	1979
Miroslav Markićević	New Serbia	Čačak	1958
Vesna Marković	Serbian Progressive Party	Zemun	1974
Dragan Marković Palma	United Serbia	Jagodina	1960
Milovan Marković	Democratic Party	Valjevo	1954
Jovana Mehandžić	Democratic Party	Belgrade	1978
Jelena Mijatović	Serbian Progressive Party	Belgrade	1977
Milorad Mijatović	Social Democratic Party of Serbia	Novi Sad	1947
Predrag Mijatović	Serbian Progressive Party	Vršac	1950
Srđan Miković	Democratic Party	Pančevo	1961
Ljiljana Miladinović	Serbian Progressive Party	Belgrade	1962
Stefana Miladinović	Socialist Party of Serbia	Belgrade	1981
Vesna Milekić	Social Democratic Party of Serbia	Belgrade	1972
Saša Milenić	Together for Šumadija	Kragujevac	1967
Srđan Milivojević	Democratic Party	Kruševac	1965
Dušan Milisavljević	Democratic Party	Niš	1968
Nenad Milić	Liberal Democratic Party	Belgrade	1962
Đorđe Milićević	Socialist Party of Serbia	Valjevo	1978
Radoslav Milovanović	Democratic Party	Kučevo	1961
Ljubica Milošević	Party of United Pensioners of Serbia	Aranđelovac	1947
Marko Milutinović	Democratic Party of Serbia	Belgrade	1985
Milan Mirosavljević	Democratic Party	Belgrade	1972
Branislav Mitrović	G17 Plus	Užice	1966
Nataša Mićić	Liberal Democratic Party	Užice	1965
Dragoljub Mićunović	Democratic Party	Belgrade	1930
Dejan Mihajlov	Democratic Party of Serbia	Belgrade	1972
Miletić Mihajlović	Socialist Party of Serbia	Petrovac	1951
Gorica Mojović	Democratic Party	Belgrade	1952
Dušica Morčev	Democratic Party of Serbia	Belgrade	1978
Ljubica Mrdaković Todorović	Serbian Progressive Party	Niš	1962
Milutin Mrkonjić	Socialist Party of Serbia	Belgrade	1942
Mujo Muković	Bosniak People's Party	Tutin	1963
Dejan Nikolić	Democratic Party	Sokobanja	1979
Dragan Nikolić	Serbian Progressive Party	Vranje	1960
Dušica Nikolić	Serbian Progressive Party	Belgrade	1962
Miodrag Nikolić	Economic Renewal of Serbia	Jagodina	1950
Ana Novković	G17 Plus	Kovin	1965
Dušan Obradović	Democratic Party	Kragujevac	1985
Jasmina Obradović	Serbian Progressive Party	Futog	1961
Marija Obradović	Serbian Progressive Party	Belgrade	1974
Radojko Obradović	Democratic Party of Serbia	Zemun	1966
Meho Omerović	Social Democratic Party of Serbia	Belgrade	1959
Zoran Ostojić	Liberal Democratic Party	Belgrade	1956
Jovan Palalić	Democratic Party of Serbia	Bačka Palanka	1971
Ljuban Panić	Democratic Party	Vršac	1985
Biljana Pantić Pilja	Serbian Progressive Party	Novi Sad	1983
Olena Papuga	League of Social Democrats of Vojvodina	Ruski Krstur	1964
Balint Pastor	Alliance of Vojvodina Hungarians	Subotica	1979
Vera Paunović	Party of United Pensioners of Serbia	Lazarevac	1947
Snežana Paunović	Socialist Party of Serbia	Peć	1975
Aleksandar Pejčić	Democratic Party of Serbia	Leskovac	1968
Zoltan Pek	Alliance of Vojvodina Hungarians	Senta	1962
Borislav Pelević	Independent	Belgrade	1956
Slobodan Perić	Vlach Unification Movement	Petrovac	1964
Miroslav Petković	Democratic Party of Serbia	Čačak	1968
Petar Petković	Democratic Party of Serbia	Belgrade	1980
Dušan Petrović	Together for Serbia	Šabac	1966
Mira Petrović	Party of United Pensioners of Serbia	Novi Beograd	1956
Petar Petrović	United Serbia	Jagodina	1951
Milisav Petronijević	Socialist Party of Serbia	Belgrade	1949
Judita Popović	Liberal Democratic Party	Zrenjanin	1956
Nenad Popović; Vice-President of the National Assembly	Democratic Party of Serbia	Belgrade	1966
Mileta Poskurica	Serbian Progressive Party	Kragujevac	1954
Zoran Pralica	Association of Small and Medium Businesses and Entrepreneurs of Serbia	Belgrade	1967
Čedomir Protić	Party of United Pensioners of Serbia	Lučani	1936
Dejan Radenković	Socialist Party of Serbia	Priština	1971
Zoran Radovanović	Socialist Party of Serbia	Niš	1970
Tanja Radovanović	Serbian Progressive Party	Šabac	1969
Milica Radović	Democratic Party of Serbia	Belgrade	1976
Aleksandar Radojević	Serbian Progressive Party	Čačak	1965
Radovan Raičević	Serbian Progressive Party	Kuršumlija	1955
Dejan Rajčić	New Serbia	Niš	1966
Katarina Rakić	Serbian Progressive Party	Belgrade	1979
Vesna Rakonjac	Serbian Progressive Party	Kruševac	1967
Boris Ranković	Democratic Party	Obrenovac	1974
Sanda Rašković Ivić	Democratic Party of Serbia	Belgrade	1956
Boško Ristić	Together for Serbia	Niš	1961
Marijan Rističević	People's Peasant Party	Novi Karlovci	1958
Slavica Saveljić	Together for Šumadija	Kragujevac	1965
Ranka Savić	Liberal Democratic Party	Belgrade	1958
Slavica Savić	Social Democratic Party of Serbia	Belgrade	1948
Slobodan Samardžić	Democratic Party of Serbia	Belgrade	1953
Konstantin Samofalov	Democratic Party	Belgrade	1982
Aleksandar Senić	Democratic Party	Rača	1978
Srđan Spasojević	New Serbia	Kraljevo	1966
Suzana Spasojević	Socialist Party of Serbia	Smederevo	1970
Mile Spirovski	Democratic Party of Macedonians	Pančevo, Jabuka	1956
Živojin Stanković	Democratic Party	Leskovac	1971
Velimir Stanojević	New Serbia	Čačak	1964
Rajko Stevanović	I Live for Krajina	Zaječar	1958
Zvonimir Stević	Socialist Party of Serbia	Priština, Gračanica	1957
Vesna Stepić	Socialist Party of Serbia	Šabac	1982
Borislav Stefanović	Democratic Party	Novi Sad	1974
Nebojša Stefanović; President of the National Assembly	Serbian Progressive Party	Belgrade	1976
Momir Stojanović	Serbian Progressive Party	Niš	1958
Nevena Stojanović	United Serbia	Mladenovac	1986
Snežana Stojanović-Plavšić	G17 Plus	Leskovac	1961
Miodrag Stojković	Democratic Party	Leskovac	1964
Ljubiša Stojmirović	Serbian Progressive Party	Belgrade	1950
Miroljub Stojčić	Socialist Party of Serbia	Vranje	1956
Đorđe Stojšić	League of Social Democrats of Vojvodina	Sremska Mitrovica	1977
Milorad Stošić	Party of United Pensioners of Serbia	Niš	1954
Željko Sušec	Serbian Progressive Party	Pančevo	1977
Dragan Todorović	Movement of Socialists	Pirot	1969
Aleksandra Tomić	Serbian Progressive Party	Belgrade	1969
Dragan Tomić	Serbian Progressive Party	Šabac	1958
Vučeta Tošković	Serbian Progressive Party	Novi Sad	1941
Jelena Travar-Miljević	G17 Plus	Žitište	1979
Jelena Trivan	Democratic Party	Belgrade	1973
Tamara Tripić	Democratic Party	Belgrade	1975
Zaharije Trnavčević	Rich Serbia	Belgrade	1926
Nikola Tulimirović	None of the Above	Belgrade	1981
Dubravka Filipovski	New Serbia	Belgrade	1967
Arpad Fremond	Alliance of Vojvodina Hungarians	Pačir	1981
Kenan Hajdarević	Liberal Democratic Party	Priboj	1975
Riza Halimi	Party for Democratic Action	Preševo	1947
Biljana Hasanović-Korać	Democratic Party	Vršac	1955
Slobodan Homen	Democratic Party	Belgrade	1972
Neven Cvetićanin	Social Democratic Party of Serbia	Vršac	1974
Vladimir Cvijan	Independent	Belgrade	1976
Sanja Čeković	Together for Serbia	Negotin	1957
Karolj Čizik	League of Social Democrats of Vojvodina	Senta	1960
Mirko Čikiriz	Serbian Renewal Movement	Kragujevac	1963
Momo Čolaković	Party of United Pensioners of Serbia	Novi Sad	1940
Dragan Čolić	Serbian Progressive Party	Smederevo	1953
Gordana Čomić; Vice-President of the National Assembly	Democratic Party	Novi Sad	1958
Aleksandar Čotrić	Serbian Renewal Movement	Belgrade	1966
Srđan Šajn	Roma Party	Kovačica	1963
Petar Škundrić	Socialist Party of Serbia	Belgrade	1947
Dragan Šormaz	Serbian Progressive Party	Smederevo	1967
Dragan Šutanovac	Democratic Party	Belgrade	1968

== List of members of the 9th National Assembly whose mandate was terminated ==
Name	Political Party	Term of Office	Year of birth
Aleksandar Antić	Socialist Party of Serbia	31 May 2012 – 29 August 2013	1969
Milan Bačević	Serbian Progressive Party	31 May 2012 – 15 June 2012	1953
Marija Blečić	Serbian Progressive Party	31 May 2012 – 29 October 2012	1972
Stana Božović	Serbian Progressive Party	31 May 2012 – 28 September 2012	1962
Ljubica Vasić	Serbian Progressive Party	31 May 2012 – 24 January 2013	1983
Vladan Vasić	G17 Plus	31 May 2012 – 30 August 2012	1971
Aleksandar Vulin	Movement of Socialists	31 May 2012 – 3 August 2012	1972
Aleksandar Vučić	Serbian Progressive Party	31 May 2012 – 27 July 2012	1970
Bratislav Gašić	Serbian Progressive Party	31 May 2012 – 29 August 2012	1967
Ivica Dačić	Socialist Party of Serbia	31 May 2012 – 27 July 2012	1966
Milica Delević	Democratic Party	31 May 2012 – 24 May 2013	1969
Oliver Dulić	Democratic Party	31 May 2012 – 29 November 2012	1975
Dragan Đilas	Democratic Party	31 May 2012 – 1 June 2012	1967
Slavica Đukić Dejanović	Socialist Party of Serbia	31 May 2012 – 27 July 2012	1951
Nebojša Zdravković	G17 Plus	2 August 2012 – 7 September 2012	1969
Velimir Ilić	New Serbia	31 May 2012 – 26 July 2012	1951
Aleksandra Jerkov	League of Social Democrats of Vojvodina	31 May 2012 – 11 January 2013	1982
Branislav Jovanović	G17 Plus	31 May 2012 – 2 September 2013	1955
Miloš Jovanović	Democratic Party of Serbia	31 May 2012 – 7 October 2013	1976
Neđo Jovanović	Socialist Party of Serbia	31 May 2012 – 17 October 2013	1962
Dragan Jočić	Democratic Party of Serbia	31 May 2012 – 29 June 2012	1960
Ivica Kojić	G17 Plus	31 May 2012 – 27 July 2012	1974
Vojislav Koštunica	Democratic Party of Serbia	31 May 2012 – 29 June 2012	1944
Jovan Krkobabić	Party of United Pensioners of Serbia	31 May 2012 – 27 July 2012	1930
Rasim Ljajić	Social Democratic Party of Serbia	31 May 2012 – 27 July 2012	1964
Jana Ljubičić	Serbian Progressive Party	31 May 2012 – 23 July 2012	1978
Snežana Malović	Democratic Party	31 May 2012 – 29 November 2012	1976
Pavle Markov	Serbian Progressive Party	30 July 2012 – 1 October 2013	1973
Milan Marković	Democratic Party	31 May 2012 – 28 December 2012	1970
Predrag Marković	G17 Plus	31 May 2012 – 2 September 2013	1955
Zoran Mašić	Serbian Progressive Party	31 May 2012 – 4 September 2012	1953
Milosav Miličković	Serbian Progressive Party	31 May 2012 – 14 September 2012	1959
Zorana Mihajlović	Serbian Progressive Party	31 May 2012 – 27 July 2012	1970
Aleksandar Nikolić	Serbian Progressive Party	31 May 2012 – 22 June 2012	1965
Tomislav Nikolić	Serbian Progressive Party	31 May 2012 – 31 May 2012	1952
Boško Ničić	I Live for Krajina	31 May 2012 – 5 September 2012	1960
Žarko Obradović	Socialist Party of Serbia	31 May 2012 – 27 July 2012	1960
Ružica Đinđić	Democratic Party	31 May 2012 – 26 July 2012	1960
Bojan Pajtić	Democratic Party	31 May 2012 – 26 July 2012	1970
Vidoje Petrović	G17 Plus	31 May 2012 – 29 August 2012	1961
Jovanka Petrović	Democratic Party	22 January 2013 – 27 March 2013	1964
Aleksandar Popović	Democratic Party of Serbia	31 May 2012 – 29 June 2012	1971
Janko Radaković	Democratic Party	31 May 2012 – 11 January 2013	1985
Gojko Radić	Serbian Progressive Party	31 May 2012 – 6 December 2012	1960
Ifeta Radončić	Party of Democratic Action of Sandžak	31 May 2012 – 31 May 2012	1955
Mićo Rogović	Serbian Progressive Party	31 May 2012 – 29 March 2013	1965
Branko Ružić	Socialist Party of Serbia	31 May 2012 – 29 August 2013	1975
Ana Sekulović	United Serbia	31 May 2012 – 29 October 2012	1969
Veroljub Stevanović	Together for Šumadija	31 May 2012 – 2 August 2012	1946
Jorgovanka Tabaković	Serbian Progressive Party	31 May 2012 – 6 August 2012	1960
Ivica Tončev	Socialist Party of Serbia	31 May 2012 – 16 January 2013	1968
Mirko Cvetković	Democratic Party	31 May 2012 – 6 December 2012	1950
Nenad Čanak	League of Social Democrats of Vojvodina	31 May 2012 – 26 September 2012	1959
Miroslav Čučković	G17 Plus	2 August 2012 – 2 August 2012	1979
József Sándor	G17 Plus	29 August 2012 – 2 September 2013	1961
