= Đidić =

Đidić is a surname of Slavic origin. Notable people with the surname include:

- Aldin Đidić (born 1983), Bosnian football player and manager
- Amer Didić (born 1994), Canadian soccer player
- Miodrag Đidić (born 1954), lawyer and politician in Serbia

== See also ==
- Džidić, surname
