= Snežana Petrović =

Snežana Petrović may refer to:

- Snežana Petrović (Party of United Pensioners of Serbia politician) (born 1972), politician in Serbia
- Snežana Petrović (Serbian People's Party politician) (born 1965), politician in Serbia.
