= Dragosavljević =

Dragosavljević is a Serbian surname. Notable people with the surname include:

- Marko Dragosavljević (born 1994), Serbian sprint canoer
- Zlatko Dragosavljević (1967–2022), Serbian politician
