= 9th National Assembly =

9th National Assembly may refer to:

- 9th National Assembly of France
- 9th National Assembly of Laos
- 9th National Assembly of Nigeria
- 9th National Assembly of Serbia
