= Stefana =

Stefana is a given name. Notable people with the name include:

- Stefana Miladinović, Serbian politician
- Stefana Veljković, Serbian volleyball player
