= Novković =

Novković (Cyrillic script: Новковић) is a Serbian surname. It may refer to:

- Ana Novković (born 1965), Serbian politician
- Đorđe Novković (1943–2007), songwriter known for his work in SFR Yugoslavia and Croatia
- Boris Novković (born 1967), Croatian pop singer
- Rade Novković (born 1980), Serbian footballer
- Srđan Novković (born 1983), Serbian footballer

== See also ==
- Novaković, surname
