= Slobodan Veličković =

Serbian politician

Slobodan Veličković (Serbian Cyrillic: Слободан Величковић; born 19 June 1947) is a politician in Serbia. He has served three terms in the National Assembly of Serbia as a member of the Party of United Pensioners of Serbia (PUPS).

== Private life ==
Veličković is retired. Formerly based in Leskovac, he now lives in Belgrade. He has a son called Žarko and a grandson called Vukašin.

== Political career ==
Veličković has been a vice-president of the PUPS and has served for many years as president of its party organization in Leskovac.

The PUPS contested the 2012 Serbian parliamentary election in an alliance with the Socialist Party of Serbia. Veličković received the twenty-sixth position on the Socialist-led electoral list and was elected when the list won forty-four mandates. Following the election, the PUPS joined a coalition government led by the Serbian Progressive Party and the Socialists, and Veličković served with the ministry's parliamentary majority. He received the forty-ninth position on the Socialist list in the 2014 Serbian parliamentary election; the list once again won forty-four mandates, and he was not initially returned. He was, however, awarded a mandate on 25 January 2016 as a replacement for Milan Korać, and served until the dissolution of the assembly for new elections later in the year. The PUPS continued to support the ministry during this period.

In early 2016, the PUPS ended its electoral alliance with the Socialist Party and formed a new alliance with the Progressive Party, contesting the 2016 parliamentary election on the latter's Aleksandar Vučić – Serbia Is Winning list. Veličković received the 244th list position (out of 250). This was too low a position for direct election to be a realistic prospect, and indeed he was not re-elected even as the Progressive list won 131 out of 250 seats. He was nonetheless awarded a mandate on 3 March 2020 as a replacement for Vera Paunović and thereby re-entered the assembly in time to serve on its last officially scheduled day of business prior to the 2020 Serbian parliamentary election. (Parliament was subsequently recalled due to the global COVID-19 pandemic and served for a further five days.)

Veličković was not a candidate in the 2020 Serbian parliamentary election.
