= Tibor Vaš =

Serbian politician

Tibor Vaš (Serbian Cyrillic: Тибор Ваш; born 1961) is a politician in Serbia from the country's Hungarian community. He was a member of the Assembly of Vojvodina from 2001 to 2008 and has served in the municipal government of Zrenjanin and on Serbia's Hungarian National Council. Vaš is a member of the League of Social Democrats of Vojvodina (LSV).

== Private life and career ==
Vaš is an economist based in Zrenjanin.

== Political career ==
=== Member of the Assembly of Vojvodina ===
Vaš was elected to the Vojvodina Assembly for Zrenjanin's sixth division in the 2000 Vojvodina provincial election, the first to be held following the downfall of Serbian and Yugoslavian leader Slobodan Milošević. The LSV participated in this election as part of the Democratic Opposition of Serbia (DOS), which won a landslide majority victory.

Vojvodina's electoral system was subsequently reformed, switching from a first past the post model to one in which half the assembly seats were selected by proportional representation and the other half by run-off elections in individual constituencies. Vaš was re-elected in the 2004 provincial election for Zrenjanin's redistricted second division as a candidate of the LSV-led Together for Vojvodina alliance. Following the election, this alliance joined with the Democratic Party and other groups to form a new coalition government, and Vaš again served as a supporter of the provincial ministry. He was vice-chair of the provincial agricultural committee in this period.

Vaš was defeated in his bid for re-election in Zrenjanin's second constituency seat in the 2008 election. (He was also included in Together for Vojvodina's electoral list in the same election, receiving the nineteenth position. The alliance won five proportional seats. During this period, mandates were distributed at the discretion of successful parties and coalitions and were often awarded out of numerical order. Vaš could have been selected for a new mandate by virtue of being included on the Together for Vojvodina's proportional list, although in the event he was not.)

He received the thirty-eighth position on the LSV's electoral list in the 2016 provincial election. By this time, Serbia's electoral system had been reformed again, such that all seats were determined by proportional representation and mandates on successful lists were awarded in numerical order. The LSV won nine seats, and he was not included in its assembly delegation.

=== Municipal government ===
Vaš has served at different times on Zrenjanin's municipal assembly and municipal council (the latter being the executive branch of the municipal government). He was stripped of his city assembly mandate in December 2012 under very controversial circumstances; this decision was subsequently overturned in court and his mandate returned.

=== Hungarian National Council ===
Vaš led his own electoral list for the elections to Serbia's Hungarian National Council in 2014. The list won one seat, and he served on the council for the next four years. He did not seek re-election in 2018.

=== Elections for the National Assembly ===
Vaš has sought election to the National Assembly of Serbia on two occasions. In the 2007 Serbian parliamentary election, he received the forty-fifth position on a coalition list that included the LSV and was led by the Liberal Democratic Party (LDP). The list won fifteen seats; Vaš was not selected for a mandate. He later received the 149th position on a coalition list led by the LDP, the LSV, and the Social Democratic Party in the 2016 Serbian parliamentary election. By this time, mandates were awarded in numerical order; the list won thirteen mandates, and he was not elected.

== Electoral record ==
=== Provincial (Vojvodina) ===
2008 Vojvodina assembly election Zrenjanin II (constituency seat) - First and Second Rounds
Bratislav Tomić	For a European Vojvodina–Boris Tadić	5,105	26.47	6,859	62.90
Tibor Vaš (incumbent)	Coalition: Together for Vojvodina-Nenad Čanak	4,313	22.36	4,046	37.10
Sima Baloš	Serbian Radical Party	3,265	16.93		
Ferenc Šmit	Hungarian Coalition–István Pásztor	2,138	11.08		
Milan Mandić	Socialist Party of Serbia–Party of United Pensioners of Serbia	1,674	8.68		
Dragiša Albulj	Democratic Party of Serbia–New Serbia–Vojislav Koštunica	1,603	8.31		
Judita Popović	Liberal Democratic Party	1,190	6.17		
Total valid votes		19,288	100	10,905	100
Invalid ballots		779		1,003	
Total votes casts		20,067	65.06	11,908	38.20

2004 Vojvodina assembly election Zrenjanin II (constituency seat) - First and Second Rounds
Tibor Vaš (incumbent)	Together for Vojvodina	2,041	19.17	4,134	52.15
Zoltan Đarmati	Alliance of Vojvodina Hungarians	2,133	20.04	3,793	47.85
Milorad Krstin	Serbian Radical Party	1,839	17.28		
Aleksandra Vojičić	Democratic Party of Serbia	1,328	12.48		
Slobodan Radišić	Strength of Serbia Movement	1,104	10.37		
Laslo Fuks	G17 Plus	1,057	9.93		
Ivanka Stanimirov	Socialist Party of Serbia	629	5.91		
Ljubiša Samardžić	Democratic Alternative–Social Democratic Party	514	4.83		
Total valid votes		10,645	100	7,927	100
Invalid ballots		728		2,537	
Total votes casts		11,373	37.20	10,464	37.45
