= Elvira Kovács =

Serbian politician

- Kovács Elvira
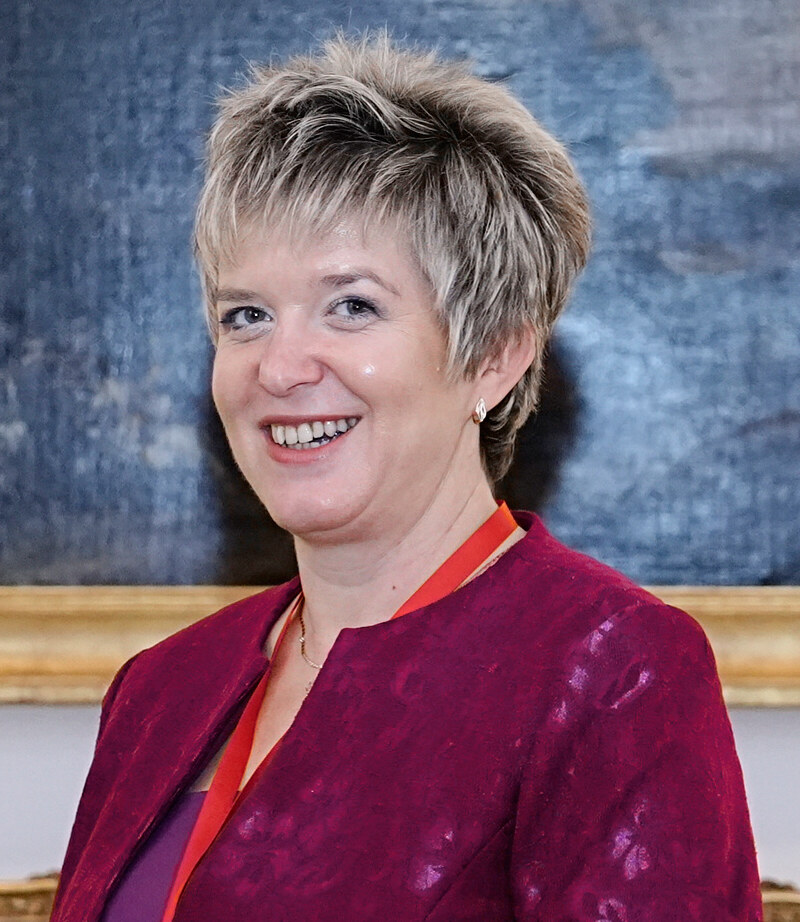
- Elvira Kovács in 2023

Vice President of the National Assembly of the Republic of Serbia
- In office 20 March 2024 – 17 November 2026
- In office 2 August 2022 – 6 February 2024
- In office 22 October 2020 – 1 August 2022

Member of the National Assembly of the Republic of Serbia
- Incumbent
- Assumed office 18 July 2007

Vice President of the Parliamentary Assembly of the Council of Europe
- In office 24 January 2022 – 21 January 2024

Member of the Parliamentary Assembly of the Council of Europe
- Incumbent
- Assumed office 23 May 2014

Substitute Member of the Parliamentary Assembly of the Council of Europe
- In office 12 January 2013 – 23 May 2014
- In office 30 September 2007 – 1 October 2012

Personal details
- Born: 18 July 1982 (age 44) Zrenjanin, SR Serbia, SFR Yugoslavia
- Party: VMSZ
- Education: Faculty of Economics
- Alma mater: University of Novi Sad (Subotica)

Elvira Kovács (Serbian Cyrillic: Елвира Ковач, romanized: Elvira Kovač; born 18 July 1982) is a Serbian politician from the country's Hungarian community. She has served in the Serbian parliament from 2007 to 2026 as a member of the Alliance of Vojvodina Hungarians (VMSZ).

== Early life and career ==
Kovács was born in Zrenjanin, in what was then the Socialist Autonomous Province of Vojvodina in the Socialist Republic of Serbia, Socialist Federal Republic of Yugoslavia. She graduated from the faculty of economics at the Subotica campus of the University of Novi Sad in 2006 and worked afterward in the health and social policy secretariat in the executive council of Vojvodina.

== Politician ==
Kovács joined the VMSZ in 2000 and was elected to its youth forum presidency in 2006. In 2005, she became a regional trainer for the National Democratic Institute.

=== Member of the National Assembly ===
==== Koštunica and Cvetković administrations (2007–12) ====
Kovács appeared in the 224th position on the VMSZ's electoral list in the 2007 Serbian parliamentary election. The list won three seats. She was not initially included in her party's delegation, but she received a mandate on 18 July 2007 as a replacement for Andrea Galgó Ferenci, who had resigned. (From 2000 to 2011, Serbian parliamentary mandates were awarded to sponsoring parties or coalitions rather than to individual candidates, and it was common practice for the mandates to be assigned out of numerical order. Kovács's specific list position had no formal bearing on her chances of election.) In her first term, she was a member of the committee for culture and information. The VMSZ served in opposition to Vojislav Koštunica's administration during this time.

For the 2008 parliamentary election, Kovács received the fourth position on the electoral list of the Hungarian Coalition, a multi-party alliance led by the VMSZ. The coalition won four seats, all of which were assigned to VMSZ members, and she was chosen for a second term in the assembly. The For a European Serbia (ZES) alliance led by the Democratic Party (DS) won the election and afterward formed a coalition government with the Socialist Party of Serbia (SPS), and the VMSZ provided crucial support for the administration in the assembly. Kovács was a member of the labour committee, (Note: Formally known as the Committee on Labour, Veterans' Affairs, and Social Affairs.) the committee on development and international economic relations, and the working group on the rights of the child; a deputy member of the committee on agriculture, the committee on petitions and proposals, and the committee for local self-government; and a member of the parliamentary friendship groups with Croatia, Germany, Italy, and Slovakia.

Kovács also led the Hungarian Coalition's electoral list for Zrenjanin in the 2008 Serbian local elections, which were held concurrently with the national assembly vote. The list won two mandates, and she did not take a seat in the city assembly.

==== Dačić and Vučić administrations (2012–2017) ====
Serbia's electoral system was reformed in 2011, such that all parliamentary mandates were awarded to candidates on successful lists in numerical order. Kovács received the third position on the VMSZ's list in the 2012 parliamentary election and was re-elected when the list won five mandates. The Serbian Progressive Party (SNS) won the election and afterward formed a new coalition government with the SPS and other parties; the VMSZ declined an invitation to join the government and instead served in a largely nominal opposition role for the next two years. In her third term, Kovács was a member of the committee on the rights of the child and the committee on human and minority rights and gender equality, a deputy member of the finance committee, (Note: Formally known as the Committee on Finance, Budget, and Control of Public Spending.) and a member of the friendship groups with Germany and Slovakia. She was also briefly a member of Serbia's delegation to the Parliamentary Assembly of the Black Sea Economic Cooperation (PABSEC), before being succeeded by fellow party member Zoltán Pék.

She again received the third position on the VMSZ list in the 2014 parliamentary election and was elected to a fourth term when the list won six seats. After the election, the VMSZ began providing support to Serbia's SNS-led government in the national assembly. Kovács was deputy chair of the European integration committee, a member of the human rights committee and the committee on the rights of the child, and a deputy member of the labour committee (Note: Formally known as the Committee on Labour, Social Issues, Social Inclusion, and Poverty Reduction.) and the health and family committee. She continued her membership in the friendship groups with Germany and Slovakia.

For the 2016 parliamentary election, Kovács was promoted to second place on the VMSZ list and was re-elected when the party won four seats. As in the previous parliament, she served as deputy chair of the European integration committee and was a member of the committee on human rights, the committee on the rights of the child, and the friendship groups with Germany and Slovakia. She was also the deputy chair of the European Union–Serbia stabilization and association committee, a deputy member of the committee on constitutional and legislative issues, a member of the working group for the political empowerment of persons with disabilities, and a member of the working group for national minority rights.

==== Brnabić and Vučević administrations (2017–present) ====
The VMSZ led a successful drive to increase its voter turnout in the 2020 Serbian parliamentary election and won a record nine seats. Kovács, who once again appeared in the second position on the party's list, was elected to a sixth term. On 22 October 2020, she was chosen as a vice-president (i.e., deputy speaker) of the assembly. She was also promoted to chair of the European integration committee, continued in the role of deputy chair of the stabilization and association committee, served on the foreign affairs committee and the committee on the rights of the child, was the leader of Serbia's parliamentary friendship group with Denmark, and remained a member of the friendship groups with Germany and Slovakia.

She again received the second position on the VMSZ list in the 2022 parliamentary election and was elected to a seventh term as the party fell back to five seats. In the 2022–24 parliament, she was again chosen as a deputy speaker, chaired the European integration committee, and was a member of the foreign affairs committee, the committee on the rights of the child, the stabilization and association committee, and the friendship groups with Denmark, Germany, Hungary, and Sweden.

Kovács appeared in the second position on the VMSZ list for a fourth consecutive time in the 2023 parliamentary election and was re-elected when the list won six seats. Chosen for a third term as deputy speaker, she holds the same committee responsibilities as in the previous parliament and is also a deputy member of the health and family committee. She is a member of the friendship groups with Germany and Hungary.

She was a vice-president of the VMSZ in 2023–24 and is now a member of its presidency.

=== Member of the Parliamentary Assembly of the Council of Europe ===
Kovács served as a substitute member of Serbia's delegation to the Parliamentary Assembly of the Council of Europe (PACE) from October 2007 to October 2012 and again from January 2013 to May 2014. She was promoted to full membership on 23 May 2014 and has continued in this role since that time. She sits with the parliamentary group of the European People's Party and is currently one of the party's vice-chairs. In May 2017, she affirmed that Serbia was still working toward its strategic goal of membership in the European Union.

Kovács chaired the PACE committee on equality and non-discrimination from 2018 to 2020. She remains a full member of the committee and is also a member of the committee on honouring the obligations and commitments by member states of the Council of Europe. She became a vice-president of the PACE assembly on 24 January 2022 and served in this role for a two-year term.
