= Snežana Petrović (Party of United Pensioners of Serbia politician) =

Serbian politician

Snežana B. Petrović (Serbian Cyrillic: Снежана Б. Петровић; born 1972) is a politician in Serbia. She served in the National Assembly of Serbia from 2016 to 2020 as a member of the Party of United Pensioners of Serbia (PUPS).

== Private career ==
Petrović is a political scientist specializing in international relations. She lives in New Belgrade in the city of Belgrade. She has more than twenty-five years of work experience at Pošta Srbije; she was head of cabinet in the Pošta Srbije executive from 2012 to 2016, when PUPS leader Milan Krkobabić was the agency's director, and continued in this role under Krkobabić's replacement, fellow PUPS assembly member Mira Petrović.

== Politician ==
The PUPS contested the 2016 Serbian parliamentary election as part of the Aleksandar Vučić – Serbia Is Winning electoral alliance led by the Serbian Progressive Party. Petrović received the eighty-seventh position on the alliance's electoral list and was elected when the list a won a majority victory with 131 out of 250 mandates. In July 2016, she was selected as chair of the assembly committee on the economy, regional development, trade, tourism, and energy. She was also a member of the committee on spatial planning, transport, infrastructure, and telecommunications; a deputy member of the defence and internal affairs committee and the committee on finance, state budget, and control of public spending; and a member of the parliamentary friendship groups with Belarus, Bosnia and Herzegovina, China, Croatia, Cyprus, France, Germany, Greece, Israel, Italy, Japan, Kenya, Montenegro, North Macedonia, Russia, Slovenia, Switzerland, and the United Arab Emirates.

She appeared in the 247th position on the Progressive Party's Aleksandar Vučić — For Our Children list in the 2020 Serbian parliamentary election. This was too low a position for re-election to be a realistic prospect, and she was not re-elected even as the list won a majority victory with 188 out of 250 mandates. It is possible, though unlikely, that Petrović could return to parliament in the current sitting of the assembly as the replacement for another PUPS member.

Petrović currently oversees the secretariat of Serbia's ministry of rural welfare, working once again with Milan Krkobabić in the latter's capacity as minister.
