= Ivana Dinić =

Serbian politician

Ivana Dinić (Serbian Cyrillic: Ивана Динић; born 16 October 1985) is a politician in Serbia. She is currently serving her third term in the National Assembly of Serbia as a member of the Socialist Party of Serbia.

== Private career ==
Dinić is from Medijana in Niš and is an electrical engineer in private life.

== Political career ==
Dinić was elected to the Serbian parliament in the elections of 2012 and 2014, in each case after receiving a high position on the electoral list of the Socialist Party and its allies. She received the thirty-sixth position on the list in the 2016 parliamentary election and, as the Socialist-led alliance only won twenty-nine mandates, was not initially re-elected. She returned to the assembly on December 28, 2016, as a replacement for Ivica Tončev, who had resigned his assembly seat to accept a secretary of state position in the Serbian ministry of foreign affairs. The Socialist Party has been part of Serbia's coalition government since 2008, and Dinić has been part of the government's parliamentary majority throughout her time in the assembly.
