= Džidić =

Džidić is a surname of Slavic origin. Notable people with the surname include:

- Damir Džidić (born 1987), Bosnian and Croatian footballer
- Franjo Džidić (1939–2025), Bosnian football player and manager
- Ivica Džidić (born 1984), Croatian footballer

== See also ==
- Đidić, surname
