= Ivan Bauer =

Politician, academic, and media personality in Serbia

Ivan Bauer (Serbian Cyrillic: Иван Бауер; born November 28, 1967) is a politician, academic, and media personality in Serbia. He served in the National Assembly of Serbia from 2012 to 2020, aside from a brief interruption in 2016. Bauer is a member of the Social Democratic Party of Serbia (SDPS).

== Early life and career ==
Bauer was born in Belgrade, in what was then the Socialist Republic of Serbia in the Socialist Federal Republic of Yugoslavia. He is a graduate of the Faculty of Electrical Engineering at the University of Belgrade and holds a master of economic sciences degree from Singidunum University, where he has taught digital marketing since 2008. His Ph.D. thesis is entitled, "Digital marketing techniques and perspectives of their application in Serbia." Bauer has also written several newspaper articles and hosted the popular television quiz shows Muzička slagalica and Sam protiv svih.

== Political career ==
Bauer became a member of the Social Democratic Party of Serbia in 2010. For the 2012 Serbian parliamentary election, the SDPS joined the Choice for a Better Life electoral alliance led by Boris Tadić's Democratic Party. Bauer received the eighty-third position on the alliance's electoral list, which won sixty-seven mandates. While not immediately declared elected, he was able to take his seat in the assembly on July 30, 2012, after SDPS leader Rasim Ljajić resigned from parliament to take a cabinet position in a new coalition government led by Ivica Dačić.

The SDPS joined the Aleksandar Vučić — Future We Believe In electoral list led by the Serbian Progressive Party for the 2014 parliamentary election. Bauer received the fortieth position on the list and was returned for a second term when the list won a landslide victory with 158 out of 250 mandates. For the 2016 election, he received the 235th position on the successor Aleksandar Vučić – Serbia Is Winning list. This low placement virtually ensured that he would not be directly elected; nonetheless, he was able to begin a third term in the legislature on August 10, 2016, after Ljajić once again resigned his assembly seat to take a cabinet post.

A photogenic figure, Bauer has often served as a public spokesperson for the SDPS, including in its proposals for electoral reform in 2013. He is currently a member of the parliamentary committee on the diaspora and Serbs in the region; a deputy member of the committees on European Integration and on spatial planning, transport, infrastructure, and telecommunications; a deputy member of Serbia's delegation to the NATO Parliamentary Assembly (where Serbia has associate membership status); and a member of the parliamentary friendship groups for Australia, Bulgaria, Canada, Finland, France, Germany, Israel, Italy, Japan, Russia, South Korea, the United Kingdom, and the United States of America.

Since August 2021 — Serbian Ambassador to Morocco.
