= Vladimir Marinković =

Serbian politician

PhD Vladimir Marinković
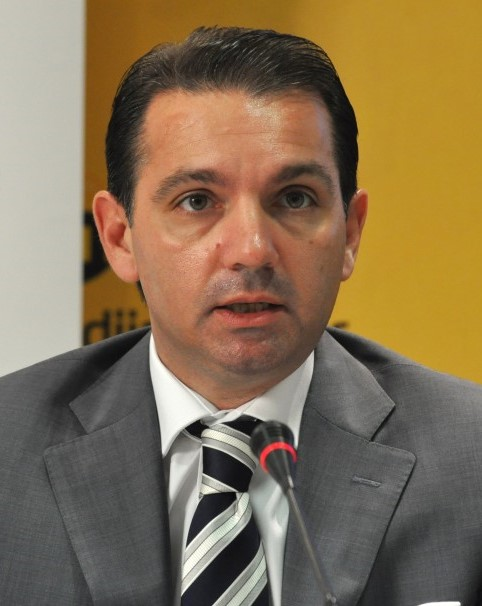

Vice president of the National Assembly of Serbia
- In office 23 April 2014 – 3 August 2020
- President: Tomislav Nikolić; Aleksandar Vučić

Personal details
- Born: 6 February 1976 (age 50) Belgrade, SFR Yugoslavia
- Party: Social Democratic Party of Serbia (unknown–2020); Serbian Progressive Party (2020–present)
- Education: Alfa BK University
- Occupation: Politician, professor

Vladimir Marinković (Serbian Cyrillic: Владимир Маринковић; born 6 February 1976) is a politician in Serbia. He has served in the National Assembly of Serbia since 2012, initially as a member of the Social Democratic Party of Serbia (SDPS) and later as a member of the Serbian Progressive Party.

== Private life ==
Marinković has been an associate professor at the Independent University of Banja Luka and at Megatrend University in Belgrade, where he has taught the fundamentals of management and human resource management.

== Politician ==
Marinković was a candidate of the Strength of Serbia Movement in the parliamentary elections of 2007 and 2008. The party's electoral list did not cross the threshold to win representation in the assembly on either occasion.

He later joined the SDPS, which contested the 2012 Serbian parliamentary election as part of the Choice for a Better Life alliance led by the Democratic Party. Marinković received the fifty-first position on the alliance's list and was elected when the list won sixty-seven mandates. The SDPS subsequently joined a new administration led by Serbian Progressive Party and the Socialist Party of Serbia, and Marinković served as part of its parliamentary majority. He was chair of Serbia's parliamentary friendship group with the United Arab Emirates during his first term; in one interview, he spoke of the importance of improving Serbia's relations with other Gulf states, particularly Kuwait.

The SDPS joined the Progressive Party's Aleksandar Vučić — Future We Believe In electoral list for the 2014 parliamentary election. Marinković received the fiftieth position on the list and was returned for a second term when the alliance won a landslide victory with 158 out of 250 mandates. He was selected as a deputy speaker of the assembly in April 2014; in this capacity, he held official diplomatic meetings with ambassadors from the United Arab Emirates and Qatar. In January 2016, he reported that negotiations had started for American companies to supply gas to Serbia via Krk in Croatia.

Marinković again received the fiftieth position on the Progressive Party's list in the 2016 election and was re-elected when the list won a second consecutive majority with 131 seats. He was once again selected as a deputy speaker of the assembly. He met with Belarusian information minister Liliya Ananich in October 2016 and was quoted in the Belarusian media as saying, "Serbia has a warm attitude towards Belarus and President Alexander Lukashenko."

During the 2016–20 parliament, Marinković was a member of the parliamentary committee on the economy, regional development, trade, tourism, and energy; a member of the committee on the rights of the child; a deputy member of the committee on finance, state budget, and control of public spending; the chair of the subcommittee for the reports on audits conducted by the state audit institution; the leader of Serbia's parliamentary friendship groups with Guatemala, Iraq, Israel, Pakistan, and the Sovereign Military Order of Malta; and a member of the parliamentary friendship groups with South Korea, Ukraine, and the United States of America.

Marinković left the SDPS and joined the Progressive Party when the 2020 Serbian parliamentary election was called. He appeared in the forty-ninth position on Progressive-led Aleksandar Vučić — For Our Children list in the 2020 parliamentary election and was elected to a fourth term when the list won a landslide majority with 188 mandates.

There were rumours that Marinković would be selected as speaker of the assembly after the 2020 election, but this did not occur. He is now a full member of the finance committee, a member of the European Union–Serbia stabilization and association committee, and a member of the subcommittee for the consideration of reports of audits conducted by the state audit institution, and he continues to lead Serbia's parliamentary friendship groups with Israel and the Sovereign Order of Malta.

In August 2020, Marinković was a participant in the American 2020 Democratic National Convention, which was held online due to the COVID-19 pandemic. He participated in panels on American foreign policy and the role of cyber security in the fight against terrorism.

Marinković has also been a member of the informal parliamentary green group. In 2014, he invited American companies to invest in Serbia's energy sector, particularly in the field of renewable energy resources.
