= Milorad Mijatović =

Serbian politician

Milorad Mijatović (Serbian Cyrillic: Милорад Мијатовић; born November 25, 1947) is a politician and trade union official in Serbia. He has served in the National Assembly of Serbia since 2012. He is a member of the Social Democratic Party of Serbia (SDPS) and was the leader of its parliamentary group from 2012 to 2020.

== Early life and career ==
Mijatović was born in Erdevik, a village in the Šid municipality in Vojvodina, in what was then the People's Republic of Serbia in the Federal People's Republic of Yugoslavia. He holds a diploma and a master's degree from the University of Sarajevo Faculty of Natural Sciences and Mathematics and a Ph.D. from the University of Novi Sad Faculty of Natural Sciences and Mathematics. He subsequently worked as a professor of mathematics at the Higher School of Professional Business Studies in Novi Sad.

He has served as president of the Confederation of Autonomous Trade Unions of Vojvodina and vice-president of the Confederation of Autonomous Trade Unions of Serbia. During an economic downtown in 2009, he said that the latter organization was strongly considering setting up a new social democratic political party to defend the rights of workers.

== Politician ==
Mijatović joined the SDPS prior to the 2012 Serbian parliamentary election. The party contested this election as part of Boris Tadić's Choice for a Better Life coalition; Mijatović received the fourteenth position on the coalition's electoral list and was elected when the list won sixty-three mandates. Following the election, the SDPS joined a new coalition government led by the Serbian Progressive Party, and Mijatović served as part of its parliamentary majority.

The SDPS joined the Progressive Party's Aleksandar Vučić — Future We Believe In list for the 2014 parliamentary election. Mijatović received the tenth position on the list and was returned for a second term when the list won a landslide victory with 158 out of 250 mandates. He was re-elected to a third term in the 2016, in which the Progressive-led list once again won a majority victory.

During the 2016–20 assembly, Mijatović was a member of the foreign affairs committee, the security services control committee, and the committee on finance, state budget, and control of public spending; a member of the European Union–Serbia stabilization and association parliamentary committee; a member of Serbia's delegation to the Inter-Parliamentary Union Assembly; the head of Serbia's parliamentary friendship group with Sweden; and a member of its parliamentary friendship groups with Belarus, China, Germany, Guatemala, Greece, Pakistan, Russia, Ukraine, and the United States of America. He continues to lead the SDPS group in the assembly as of 2018. In 2018, he participated in a United Nations hearing on the subject, "Towards a global agreement for safe, orderly, and regular migration."

He received the twenty-first position on the Progressive Party's Aleksandar Vučić — For Our Children list in the 2020 Serbian parliamentary election and was elected to a fourth term when the list won an increased majority with 188 mandates. He stood down as SDPS parliamentary leader after the election. He continues to serve on the foreign affairs committee and the finance committee, is now a deputy member of the security services committee, continues to serve with Serbia's delegation to the Inter-Parliamentary Union and chair its friendship group with Sweden, and is a member of the friendship groups with Bosnia and Herzegovina, China, Cuba, Cyprus, Germany, Greece, Italy, Portugal, Romania, Russia, Sri Lanka, Turkey, the United States of America, and Zambia.
