= Tanja Radovanović =

Serbian politician (born 1969)

Tanja Radovanović (Serbian Cyrillic: Тања Радовановић; born 31 March 1969) is a Serbian politician. She served in the Serbian national assembly from 2012 to 2014 as a member of the Serbian Progressive Party (SNS). In 2015, she left the SNS and founded her own political movement.

== Early life and private career ==
Radovanović was born in Šabac, in what was then the Socialist Republic of Serbia in the Socialist Federal Republic of Yugoslavia. She is a music teacher and has taught accordion at the "Mihailo Vukdragović" school in the city.

== Politician ==
Radovanović appeared in the eighty-fourth position on the Progressive Party's Let's Get Serbia Moving electoral list in the 2012 Serbian parliamentary election. The list won seventy-three seats, and she was not immediately elected. The Progressives subsequently formed a coalition government with the Socialist Party of Serbia (SPS) and other parties, and a number of delegates elected on the SNS list resigned to take government positions. Radovanović was given a replacement mandate on 29 August 2012 and took her seat in the assembly on 31 August. During her assembly term, she was a member of the education committee, (Note: Formally known as the Committee on Education, Science, Technological Development, and the Information Society.) a deputy member of the committee on culture and information and the spatial planning committee, (Note: Formally known as the Committee on Spatial Planning, Transport, Infrastructure, and Telecommunications.) and a member of the parliamentary friendship groups with Austria, Cyprus, Greece, Italy, Japan, Portugal, Russia, Slovenia, Ukraine, and the United States of America.

In 2013, the Progressive Party's city board for Šabac was temporarily dissolved amid serious internal divisions, and Radovanović was appointed to a three-member board of trustees.

She was given the 207th position on the SNS's list for the 2014 parliamentary election and was not re-elected even as the list won a landslide victory with 158 out of 250 seats. She subsequently left the SNS and was briefly a member of a local Šabac party called the Village–City Initiative. She launched her own political group called the Progressive Movement (Napredni pokret) in November 2015, indicating that it would be particularly focused on issues of gender equality.

The Progressive Movement contested the 2016 Serbian local elections in Šabac and fell below the electoral threshold for assembly representation. Radovanović has not sought a return to political life since this time.
