= Neđo Jovanović =

Serbian politician

Neđo Jovanović (Serbian Cyrillic: Неђо Јовановић; born September 5, 1962) is a politician in Serbia. He is currently serving his third term in the National Assembly of Serbia as a member of the Socialist Party of Serbia.

== Early life and career ==
Jovanović was born in Prijepolje, at the time part of the People's Republic of Serbia in the Federal People's Republic of Yugoslavia. Raised in this community, he later earned a degree from the University of Belgrade Faculty of Law and worked as a lawyer in Užice, where he opened his own practice in 1995.

He has also been active in karate sports since 1979 as a competitor, coach, and judge. As of 2017, he is one of only six people in Serbia recognized as a World Karate Judge.

== Political career ==
Jovanović received the forty-third position on an electoral list led by the Socialist Party in the 2012 Serbian parliamentary election and was elected when the list won forty-four mandates. The Socialist Party joined a coalition government with the Serbian Progressive Party after the election, and Jovanović served as part of the ministry's parliamentary majority. On October 17, 2013, he resigned from the assembly to accept a position as state secretary in the ministry of justice and public administration.

He returned to parliament shortly after the 2014 parliamentary election, in which he was given the forty-eighth position on the Socialist-led list. The list once again won forty-four mandates; Jovanović, though not initially elected, was able to take his seat on May 10, 2014, following the resignation of candidates further up the list to take cabinet positions. He was promoted to the thirty-first position for the 2016 election and once again narrowly missed direct election when the list won twenty-nine mandates. The Socialist Party's alliance with the Progressives continued after this election, candidates further up the list again resigned to take cabinet roles, and Jovanović was able to take his seat in the assembly on October 6, 2016.

Jovanović is currently the deputy leader of the Socialist Party's parliamentary group; a member of the parliamentary committee on constitutional and legislative issues and the committee on the judiciary, public administration, and local self-government; and a member of the parliamentary friendship groups with Belarus, China, Cuba, Germany, Greece, Japan, Kazakhstan, and Russia. He serves on the presidency of the Socialist Party.
