= Andrea Galgó Ferenci =

Serbian politician (1973–2024)

Andrea Galgó Ferenci (also rendered as Andrea Galgó-Ferenci; Serbian Cyrillic: Андреа Галго Ференци; 8 November 1973 – December 2024) was a Serbian politician from the country's Hungarian community. She was briefly a member of the Serbian parliament in 2007, serving with the Alliance of Vojvodina Hungarians (VMSZ).

== Early life and private career ==
Galgó Ferenci was born in Bečej in what was then the Socialist Autonomous Province of Vojvodina in the Socialist Republic of Serbia, Socialist Federal Republic of Yugoslavia. She graduated from the Faculty of Economics at the Subotica campus of the University of Novi Sad and was a professor at the Higher School of Economics and Commerce in Bečej.

== Politician ==
Galgó Ferenci was given the 157th position on the VMSZ's electoral list in the 2007 Serbian parliamentary election. The list won three mandates, and she was subsequently included in her party's assembly delegation. (From 2000 to 2011, Serbian parliamentary mandates were awarded to sponsoring parties or coalitions rather than to individual candidates, and it was common practice for the mandates to be assigned out of numerical order. Galgó Ferenci's position on the list had no formal bearing on her chances of election.) The VMSZ served in opposition to Vojislav Koštunica's government during this sitting of parliament.

Galgó Ferenci was appointed a substitute member of Serbia's delegation to the Parliamentary Assembly of the Council of Europe (PACE) on 25 June 2007. She did not serve with any of the assembly's parliamentary groupings.

She resigned from the national assembly on 16 July 2007. Her membership in the PACE, which was conditional on her membership in the national assembly, came to an end on 1 October 2007.

She later received the ninth position on the electoral list of the Hungarian Coalition, a multi-party alliance led by the VMSZ, for the Bečej municipal assembly in the 2008 Serbian local elections. The list won a plurality victory with thirteen out of thirty-six seats, although she did not take a mandate afterward.

Serbia's electoral system was reformed in 2011 such that all mandates were awarded to candidates on successful lists in numerical order. Galgó Ferenci appeared in the thirty-fifth position (out of thirty-six) on the VMSZ's list for Bečej in the 2012 Serbian local elections. This was too low for election to be a realistic prospect, and she was not elected when the list won eight seats. During the post-election negotiations for a new local coalition government, Galgö Ferenci and Ištvan Acsai left the VMSZ to form a local citizen's group called For Bečej. On 16 July 2012, she was appointed to the Bečej municipal council (i.e., the executive branch of the local government) with responsibility for education, culture, and civil society. She was dropped from the council on 29 January 2015, when the VMSZ joined the local government.

== Death ==
Galgó Ferenci was reported missing by her family on 23 December 2024, and her body was found in Bečej on 31 December. She was 51. Police have ruled out third-party involvement in her death.
