= Vesna Marković =

Serbian politician

Vesna Marković (Serbian Cyrillic: Весна Марковић; born 18 July 1974) is a politician in Serbia. She has served in the National Assembly of Serbia since 2012 as a member of the Serbian Progressive Party.

== Private career ==
Marković is an economist living in the Belgrade municipality of Zemun.

== Politician ==
Marković received the thirty-ninth position on the Progressive Party's Let's Get Serbia Moving electoral list in the 2012 Serbian parliamentary election and was elected when the list won seventy-three mandates. The Progressive Party subsequently formed a coalition government with the Socialist Party of Serbia and other parties, and Marković served as part of its parliamentary majority. She was given the forty-eighth position on the party's successor Aleksandar Vučić — Future We Believe In list in the 2014 parliamentary election and was re-elected when the list won a landslide victory with 158 out of 250 seats. During the following sitting of parliament, she served as a member of the parliamentary committees on foreign affairs and European integration and was a member of Serbia's parliamentary delegation to the Parliamentary Dimension of the Central European Initiative.

Marković was granted the fifty-fourth position on the Progressive Party's Aleksandar Vučić – Serbia Is Winning list in the 2016 election and was elected to a third term when the list won a second consecutive majority with 131 seats. During the 2016–20 parliament, she continued to serve on the European integration committee, and was a member of the committee on constitutional and legislative issues; a member of the European Union–Serbia stabilization and association committee; a deputy member of Serbia's delegation the Parliamentary Dimension of the Central European Initiative; a deputy member of Serbia's delegation to the Parliamentary Assembly of the Organization for Security and Co-operation in Europe (OSCE PA); the head of Serbia's parliamentary friendship group with Germany; and a member of the parliamentary friendship groups with Belarus, the Czech Republic, Denmark, Kazakhstan, the Netherlands, and the United States of America.

In October 2017, she wrote an opinion piece in Danas highlighting the importance of Serbia's co-operation with the North Atlantic Treaty Organization (NATO). Among other things, this article referenced Nato Secretary-General Jens Stoltenberg's apology to Serbian noncombatant victims of the 1999 NATO bombing of Yugoslavia. She subsequently delivered a speech at the OSCE PA in February 2020 that accused authorities in Montenegro of discriminating against Serbian people, speakers of the Serbian language, and believers of the Serbian Orthodox Church.

Marković received the 119th position on the Progressive Party's Aleksandar Vučić — For Our Children list in the 2020 parliamentary election and was elected to a fourth term when the list won a landslide majority with 188 mandates. She is now the deputy chair of the foreign affairs committee; continues to serve on the European integration committee and the stabilization and association committee, as well as leading Serbia's parliamentary friendship group with Germany; leads Serbia's delegation to the OSCE PA; and is a member of the friendship groups with Cyprus, the United Kingdom, and the United States of America.
