= Srđan Miković =

Serbian politician

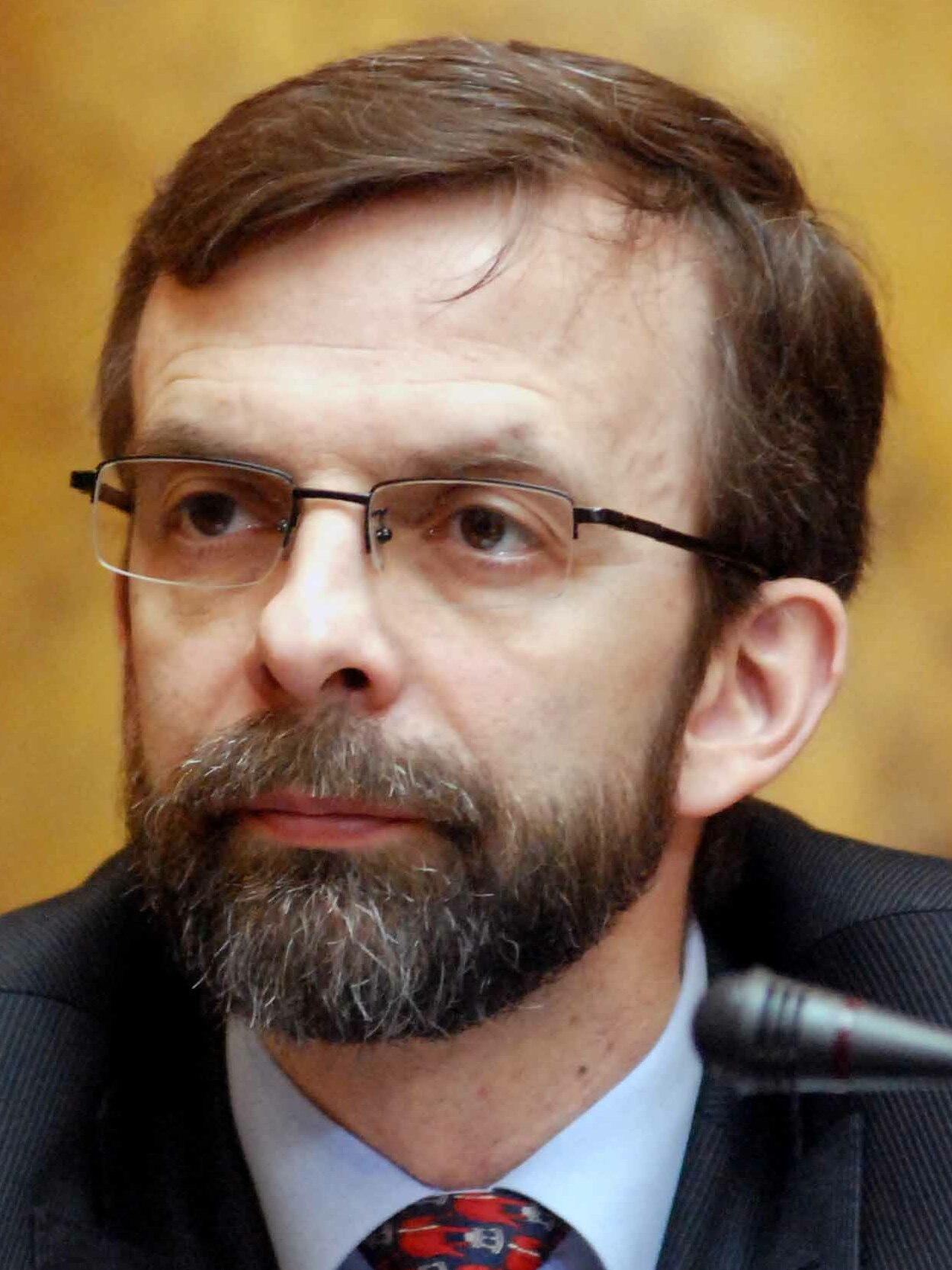
Miković in 2009

Srđan Miković (Serbian Cyrillic: Срђан Миковић; born 15 July 1961) is a Serbian politician. He served as mayor of Pančevo on two occasions and was a member of the National Assembly of Serbia from 2008 to 2014.

== Private career ==
Miković was born to a prominent family in Pančevo and is a lawyer in private life. Prior to the breakup of the Socialist Federal Republic of Yugoslavia, he was active with the Socialist Alliance of Working People of Yugoslavia (Socijalistički savez radnog naroda Jugoslavije, SSRNJ).

His father, Milan Miković, was also a member of Serbia's national assembly.

== Politician ==
=== Early years (1989–96) ===
Miković was elected to the Pančevo municipal assembly in the 1989 Serbian local elections, the last to be held while Serbia was still a one-party state. Serving as a non-partisan deputy, he was the vice-president of the assembly (i.e., deputy mayor) from 1989 to 1992. He later became active with the Democratic Movement of Serbia (Demokratski pokret Srbije, DEPOS) coalition and was the leader of its board group in the municipal assembly after the May 1992 and December 1992 local elections. Miković was in this period a member of the Serbian Renewal Movement (Srpski pokret obnove, SPO), the leading party in DEPOS.

=== First term as mayor (1996–2000) and after ===
The SPO contested the 1996 Serbian local elections as part of the Zajedno coalition, which won a narrow victory in Pančevo. Miković was chosen as president of the assembly, a position that was at the time equivalent to mayor. Three years later, he was responsible for overseeing the city's response to the NATO bombing of Yugoslavia, in which Pančevo suffered significant damage and high levels of pollution due to the destruction of industrial facilities.

In the aftermath of the Kosovo War and the NATO bombing, Miković emerged as a prominent local opponent of Slobodan Milošević's administration. Delegates from Milošević's Socialist Party of Serbia (Socijalistička partija Srbije, SPS) in the Pančevo assembly attempted to unseat him as mayor in March 2000, although this was unsuccessful. The following month, Miković took part in a delegation of Serbian opposition leaders to the United States of America, where he met with a number of government officials. In May 2000, he urged residents of Pančevo to defend the media outlet RTV Pančevo from a possible takeover by Milošević's state authorities.

Milošević was defeated by Vojislav Koštunica, the candidate of the Democratic Opposition of Serbia (Demokratska opozicija Srbije, DOS), in the 2000 Yugoslavian presidential election, a watershed moment in the political life of Yugoslavia and Serbia. The SPO was not part of this victory; the party contested the election on its own and suffered a significant defeat, as it did in the concurrent Yugoslavian parliamentary and Serbian local elections. Miković appeared in the lead position on the SPO's electoral list for the Yugoslavian Chamber of Citizens in Pančevo; the party did not cross the electoral threshold to win any seats in the division. Miković was also defeated in his bid for re-election to the Pančevo assembly, and his term as mayor ended on 7 October 2000.

He left the SPO after the 2000 election and joined the breakaway People's Party of Justice (Narodna stranka pravda, NSP). This party contested the 2003 Serbian parliamentary election in an alliance with Social Democracy (Socijaldemokratija, SD) and other parties. Miković was included on its combined electoral list, which did not cross the threshold.

=== Second term as mayor (2004–08) ===
Serbia introduced the direct election of mayors for the 2004 Serbian local elections. Miković contested the election as an independent candidate and was elected in the second round of voting. While in office, he joined the Democratic Party (Demokratska stranka, DS). He purchased new buses for the city's public transit system in 2006 and was responsible for overseeing the city's response to renewed levels of high pollution.

He appeared in the 134th position on the DS's list in the 2007 parliamentary election. The party won sixty-four seats, and he did not receive a mandate. (From 2000 to 2011, Serbian parliamentary mandates were awarded to sponsoring parties or coalitions rather than to individual candidates, and it was common practice for mandates to be assigned out of numerical order. Miković could have been included in the DS's delegation despite his position on the list, although in the event he was not.)

=== Parliamentarian (2008–14) and after ===
Miković did not seek re-election in the 2008 Serbian local elections but appeared in the 122nd position on the DS's For a European Serbia list in the concurrent parliamentary election. The list won 102 seats, and he was not initially chosen for a seat in the assembly. The results of the election were inconclusive, but the DS eventually formed a coalition government with the SPS. On 16 July 2008, Miković was given a mandate as the replacement for another DS member. He served as a government supporter. In his first term, he was a member of the committee on constitutional affairs and the legislative committee; a deputy member of the committee on justice and administration, the committee on youth and sports, and the administrative committee; and a member of the parliamentary friendship groups with Germany, Greece, and Slovenia.

Serbia's electoral system was reformed in 2011, such that all mandates were awarded in numerical order to candidates on successful lists. Miković was given the sixty-seventh position on the DS's Choice for a Better Life list and was re-elected when the list won exactly sixty-seven seats. In his second term, he was deputy chair of the committee on constitutional affairs and legislation; a member of the committee on justice, public administration, and local self-government; a deputy member of the committee on spatial planning, transport, infrastructure, and telecommunications; a deputy member of the committee on administrative, budgetary, mandate, and immunity issues; and a member of the friendship groups with Azerbaijan, Belgium, Cyprus, Germany, Greece, Hungary, Romania, Russia, Slovakia, and Slovenia.

After the 2012 election, the Democratic Party became divided between supporters of Boris Tadić and Dragan Đilas. Miković sided with Tadić and joined the latter's breakaway New Democratic Party (Nova demokratska stranka, NDS) in early 2014. He appeared in the forty-sixth position on Tadic's coalition list in the 2014 parliamentary election; the list won eighteen seats, and he was not re-elected.

The NDS later changed its name to the Social Democratic Party, and Miković led the party's list in Pančevo in the 2016 Serbian local elections. The list did not cross the electoral threshold. He has not sought a return to political life since this time.

== Electoral record ==
=== Local (City of Pančevo) ===
2004 Pančevo city election: Mayor of Pančevo
Candidate	Party	First round		Second round	
Candidate	Party	Votes	%	Votes	%
Srđan Miković	Citizens' Group	7,437	24.55	16,064	65.70
Petar Jojić	Serbian Radical Party–Tomislav Nikolić	5,853	19.32	8,387	34.30
Drago Berginc	Democratic Party–Boris Tadić	4,087	13.49		
Borislava Kruška (incumbent)	Democratic Party of Serbia–Dr. Vojislav Koštunica	3,465	11.44		
Dušan Mrvoš	"My Pančevo"	2,699	8.91		
Nikola Ugrčić	Strength of Serbia Movement–Bogoljub Karić	2,429	8.02		
Ljubiša Kesić	Coalition: Vojvodina for All–League of Social Democrats of Vojvodina, Vojvodina Coalition, Civic Alliance of Serbia, Vojvodina Green Party	2,308	7.62		
Časlav Jaraković	Serbian Renewal Movement	1,242	4.10		
Gavrilo Knjeginjić	Citizens' Group	776	2.56		
Total		30,296	100.00	24,451	100.00
Valid votes		30,296	97.14	24,451	98.29
Invalid/blank votes		893	2.86	426	1.71
Total votes		31,189	100.00	24,877	100.00
Registered voters/turnout		109,882	28.38	109,882	22.64

2000 Pančevo city election: Division 60 (Centar V)
Candidate	Party
Mile Basta	Socialist Party of Serbia–Yugoslav Left–Slobodan Milošević
Borka Žunić	Serbian Radical Party
Srđan Miković (incumbent)	Serbian Renewal Movement
Ljubomir Pokrajac	Democratic Movement for Pančevo
Nebojša Pavlović (***WINNER***)	Democratic Opposition of Serbia–Dr. Vojislav Koštunica
Miodrag Rendić	Citizens' Group
Total
