= Nebojša Berić =

Serbian politician

- Born: April 19, 1972; Sombor, Yugoslavia
- Occupation: Politician

Nebojša Berić (Serbian Cyrillic: Небојша Берић; born 19 April 1972) is a politician in Serbia. He served in the National Assembly of Serbia from 2012 to 2016, initially as a member of the Serbian Progressive Party (Srpska napredna stranka, SNS) and later as an independent.

== Early life and career ==
Berić was born in Sombor, in what was then the Socialist Republic of Serbia in the Socialist Federal Republic of Yugoslavia. He holds a degree in electrical engineering.

== Politician ==
Berić entered political life as a member of the far-right Serbian Radical Party (Srpska radikalna stranka, SRS). He appeared in the seventeenth position on that party's electoral list for the Sombor city assembly in the 2008 Serbian local elections and was given a mandate when the party won twenty-three seats. He was the SRS's nominee for municipal assembly president after the election and was defeated by Nemanja Delić of the Democratic Party (Demokratska stranka, DS).

The Radical party experienced a serious split later in the year, with several members joining the more moderate Progressive Party under the leadership of Tomislav Nikolić and Aleksandar Vučić. Berić sided with the Progressives. He received the second position on the Progressive list in the 2012 local elections and was re-elected when the list won eleven mandates.

=== Parliamentarian ===
Berić was given the eighty-sixth position on the SNS's list for the 2012 Serbian parliamentary election, which was held concurrently with the local elections. The list won seventy-three seats, and he was not initially elected. The SNS formed a coalition government with the Socialist Party of Serbia (Socijalistička partija Srbije, SPS), and several of its members subsequently resigned from the assembly to take government positions. Berić received a seat on 18 September 2012 as the replacement for another party member. He was a deputy member of the committee for the diaspora and Serbs in the region and a member of the parliamentary friendship groups with Austria, Croatia, Egypt, and Slovenia.

He received the 112th position on the SNS list in the 2014 parliamentary election and was re-elected when the list won a landslide victory with 158 out of 250 mandates. In his second term, he was a full member of the diaspora committee; a deputy member of the defense and internal affairs committee; a deputy member of the committee on the economy, regional development, trade, tourism, and energy; a member of Serbia's delegation to the Inter-Parliamentary Union; and a member of the friendship groups with Austria, Belarus, Canada, Croatia, and Germany. In 2015, he was part of the Serbian government's delegation to commemorate the twenty-year anniversary of the deaths of elderly Serb civilians in Varivode and Gošić during the Croatian army's Operation Storm.

Berić left the SNS in early 2016 and formed a new political group in Sombor called Our Villages, Our City with other former Progressives. He led the group's list for the 2016 local elections in Sombor; the list did not cross the electoral threshold to win representation in the assembly.
