= Pavle Markov =

Serbian politician

Pavle Markov (Serbian Cyrillic: Павле Марков; born 25 March 1973) was a Serbian politician and a lawyer. He served in the National Assembly of Serbia from 2012 to 2013, was the mayor of the city of Kikinda from 2013 to 2020, and following his split from the Serbian Progressive Party he returned to his profession as a lawyer.

== Early life and career ==
Markov was born in Novi Sad, in what was then the Socialist Autonomous Province of Vojvodina in the Socialist Republic of Serbia, Socialist Federal Republic of Yugoslavia. He was raised in Kikinda and later graduated from the University of Belgrade Faculty of LawIn addition to graduating from the University of Belgrade Faculty of Law, Markov completed a programme at the Belgrade Open School.He was also involved in athletics and two man bobsleigh, competing in both sports as a member of the national team of the Federal Republic of Yugoslavia.

He has practiced law since 2000 began his legal career working in his father Nikola Markov law practice before continuing as an independent lawyer.

He served as head of Kikinda's local administration on a non-partisan basis from 2004 to 2008.

== Politician ==
Markov was given the seventy-ninth position on the Progressive Party's Let's Get Serbia Moving electoral list in the 2012 Serbian parliamentary election. The list won seventy-three mandates, and he was not initially elected. He also appeared in the first position on the SNS list in Kikinda in the concurrent 2012 Serbian local elections and was elected when the list won twelve mandates. The local government was formed by the Democratic Party (Demokratska stranka, DS) after the election, and the SNS served in opposition.

The Progressives formed a coalition government with the Socialist Party of Serbia (Socijalistička partija Srbije, SPS) at the republic level after the 2012 election, and a number of its parliamentarians resigned to take ministerial positions. Markov was awarded a mandate on 30 June 2012 as the replacement for another party member. He served in parliament for the next year as a supporter of the administration.

Shifting political affiliations in Kikinda brought the Progressives to power in September 2013, and Markov was chosen as the municipality's mayor. He resigned his seat in the national assembly on 1 October as he was unable to hold a dual mandate. In early 2016, he oversaw Kikinda's transition from a municipality to a city.

Markov led the Progressives to a majority victory in Kikinda in the 2016 local elections and was confirmed for another term as mayor afterwards. In 2018, he accepted on behalf of the city the European Union's flag of honour from a representative of the Parliamentary Assembly of the Council of Europe (PACE). During this term.

He once again led the SNS list for city of Kikinda in the 2020 local elections just as he had in 2012 and 2016 and was re-elected after the list secured a convincing victory, winning twenty-eight out of thirty-nine mandates.
