= Ružica Igić =

Serbian academic and politician

Ružica Igić (Serbian Cyrillic: Ружица Игић; born 19 December 1957) is an academic and politician in Serbia. She was a member of the National Assembly of Serbia from 2012 to 2014 and has served in the Assembly of Vojvodina since 2020. Igić is a member of the Democratic Party of Serbia (Demokratska stranka Srbije, DSS).

== Early life and private career ==
Igić was born in the village of Mošorin, Titel, in the Autonomous Province of Vojvodina, in what was then the People's Republic of Serbia in the Federal People's Republic of Yugoslavia. She holds a bachelor's degree (1981), master's degree (1983), and Ph.D (1992) in biological sciences from the University of Novi Sad Faculty of Science, where she continues to work as a professor. She has published extensively in the field of botany.

== Politician ==
=== Municipal politics ===
Igić has served at least two terms in the Novi Sad city assembly. She received the sixty-fourth position on a combined electoral list of the DSS and New Serbia in the 2008 Serbian local elections. The list won five mandates, and she was chosen as part of her party's assembly delegation. (From 2000 to 2011, mandates in Serbian elections were awarded to successful parties or coalitions rather than to individual candidates, and it was common practice for the mandates to be assigned out of numerical order. Igić's specific list position had no bearing on her chances of election.)

Serbia's electoral system was reformed in 2011, such that mandates were awarded to candidates on successful lists in numerical order. Igić received the third position on the DSS's list for Novi Sad in the 2012 local elections and was re-elected when the list won five mandates. Igić was vice-president of the DSS city board in Novi Sad during this time.

The DSS formed an electoral alliance with Dveri in 2016. Igić received the ninth position on the combined DSS–Dveri list in the 2016 local elections; the list did not cross the electoral threshold to win any mandates. She was given the sixth position on the DSS-led METLA 2020 list in the 2020 local elections and was not elected when the list won three mandates.

=== Parliamentarian ===
Igić received the eighteenth position on the DSS's list in the 2012 Serbian parliamentary election and was elected when the list won twenty-one mandates. A coalition government was formed after the election by the Serbian Progressive Party, the Socialist Party of Serbia, and other parties; the DSS served in opposition. She was a member of the committee on agriculture, forestry, and water management; a deputy member of the committee on spatial planning, transport, infrastructure, and telecommunications; a deputy member of the committee on education, science, technological development, and the information society; and a member of the parliamentary friendship groups with Belarus, Cuba, Russia, and Ukraine. She received the twenty-seventh position on the DSS list in the 2014 parliamentary election; the list did not cross the threshold to win any mandates.

=== Provincial politics and further campaigns at the republic level ===
Igić appeared in the fourth position on the DSS–Dveri list in the 2016 Vojvodina provincial election and was not elected when the list failed to cross the electoral threshold. She also appeared in the 179th position on the combined list of these parties in the concurrent 2016 parliamentary election. This was too low a position for election to be a realistic prospect, and she was not returned when the list won only thirteen mandates at the republic level.

Igić received the fifth position on the METLA 2020 list in the 2020 provincial election and was elected when the list won exactly five mandates. The election was won by the Progressive Party and its allies, and the DSS serves in opposition. One of the other candidates elected on the METLA list subsequently joined the parliamentary group of the Progressive Party; since five members are needed for a parliamentary group, the DSS/METLA group ceased to exist at this time. Igić is a member of the assembly committee on education and science.

She also appeared in the fourteen position on the METLA 2020 list for the 2020 Serbian parliamentary election, which was held concurrently with the provincial election. The list failed to cross the electoral threshold.
