= Radmila Gerov =

Serbian politician

Radmila Gerov (Serbian Cyrillic: Радмила Геров; born 1967) is a politician in Serbia. She served as mayor of Negotin from 2004 to 2009 and was a member of the National Assembly of Serbia from 2012 to 2014. Gerov is a member of the Liberal Democratic Party (LDP).

== Early life and career ==
Gerov was born in Negotin, in what was then the Socialist Republic of Serbia in the Socialist Federal Republic of Yugoslavia. She was raised in the city and subsequently graduated from the University of Niš Faculty of Electronic Engineering.

== Municipal politics ==
Gerov was elected to the municipal assembly of Negotin in the 2000 local elections as a member of the Democratic Party of Serbia and was subsequently chosen as president of the assembly. She left the DSS soon after the election, saying that she did not approve of the party leadership's tendencies toward centralization, and launched her own local political group called the "Movement for Negotin and the Timok Valley" (Pokret za Negotinsku i Timočku krajinu, PNTK). She won a direct election as mayor in the 2004 local elections and continued in the position following her party's victory in the 2008 elections.

On 10 November 2009, the government of Serbia dissolved Negotin's municipal assembly and dismissed Gerov as mayor; she was appointed to a provisional authority that governed the city pending a new election in 2010. She joined the LDP shortly before this election and was named as the party's district manager for the Bor District. The LDP's electoral list finished a strong third after what Gerov described as an extremely bitter campaign, marked by personal attacks and offensive photo-montages posted by unknown parties around the city. She was re-elected in the 2014 local elections, in which the LDP won six out of forty-five seats, and led the party's group in the sitting of the assembly that followed. The LDP did not field a slate in the 2017 elections, and she stood down from office in that year.

== Member of the National Assembly ==
The LDP contested the 2012 Serbian parliamentary election as part of the Preokret (U-Turn) coalition; Gerov received the twelfth position on its electoral list and was elected when the list won nineteen mandates. For the next two years, she served in opposition to Ivica Dačić's administration and was a frequent contributor to assembly debates.

Gerov received the ninth position on the LDP's coalition list in the 2014 parliamentary election. The list did not cross the electoral threshold to win representation in the assembly. For the 2016 election, she received the twenty-fourth position on a coalition list of the LDP, the League of Social Democrats of Vojvodina, and the Social Democratic Party. The list won thirteen mandates, and she was not returned.
