= Jelena Mijatović =

Serbian politician

Jelena Mijatović (Serbian Cyrillic: Јелена Мијатовић; born 2 June 1977) is a politician in Serbia. She has served in the National Assembly of Serbia since 2012 as a member of the Serbian Progressive Party.

== Private career ==
Mijatović is a kindergarten teacher based in Belgrade.

== Political career ==
Mijatović received the forty-second position on the Progressive Party's Let's Get Serbia Moving electoral list in the 2012 Serbian parliamentary election and was elected when the list won seventy-three mandates. The Progressive Party became the dominant party in a new coalition government after the election, and Mijatović served as part of the government's parliamentary majority. She was promoted to the thirty-third position on the Progressive-led list in the 2014 election and the twenty-seventh position in 2016 election and was re-elected on both occasions when the list won majority victories.

In the 2016–20 parliament, Mijatović was a member of the assembly committee on Kosovo-Metohija, the committee on the rights of the child, and the committee on the economy, regional development, trade, tourism, and energy; a deputy member of the defence and internal affairs committee and the committee on administrative, budgetary, mandate, and immunity issues; a member of Serbia's delegation to the assembly of the Inter-Parliamentary Union; the head of Serbia's parliamentary friendship groups with Portugal and Turkmenistan; and a member of the parliamentary friendship groups with Algeria, Armenia, Austria, Azerbaijan, Belarus, China, Cuba, Germany, Greece, Israel, India, Iran, Japan, Kazakhstan, Myanmar, Palestine, Russia, Slovakia, South Africa, Turkey, and the United States of America.

She received the thirty-fourth position on the Progressive Party's list in the 2020 Serbian parliamentary election and was elected to a fourth term when the list won a landslide majority with 188 mandates. She is now the deputy chair of the committee on the rights of the child, a member of the defence committee, and a deputy member of the security services control committee. She continues to serve in Serbia's delegation to the assembly of the Inter-Parliamentary Union and lead Serbia's friendship group with Turkmenistan, and she is a member of the friendship groups with Azerbaijan, China, France, Israel, Italy, Kazakhstan, Montenegro, Portugal, Russia, Spain, the United Arab Emirates, and the United States of America.
