= Aleksandar Senić =

Serbian civil engineer, researcher, and university teacher

- Александар Сенић
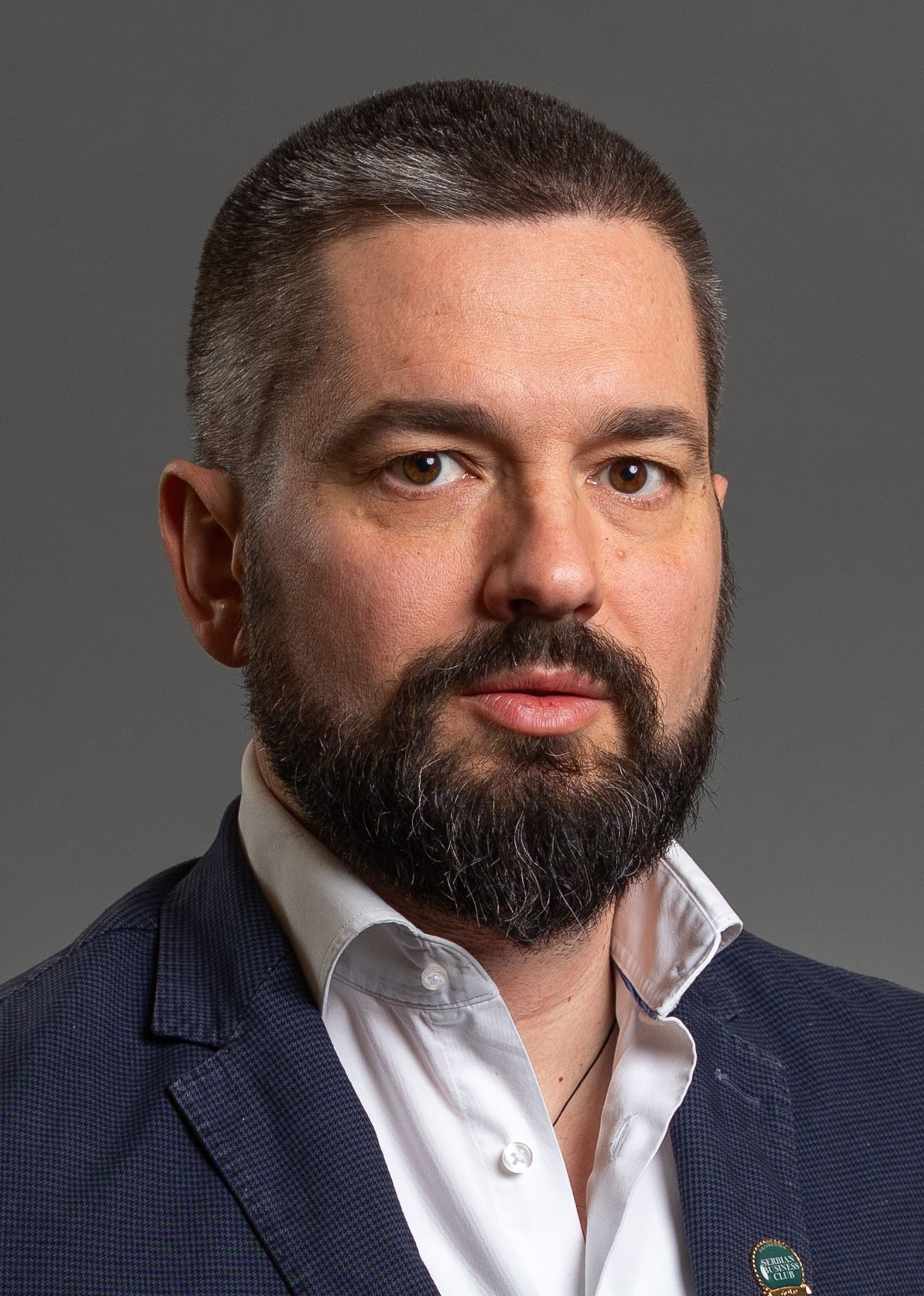
- Senić in 2026
- Born: December 13, 1978 (age 47); Viševac, Rača, SR Serbia, SFR Yugoslavia
- Occupations: Civil engineer, researcher, university teacher

Aleksandar Senić (Serbian Cyrillic: Александар Сенић; born 13 December 1978) is a Serbian civil engineer, researcher, and university teacher. He served in the National Assembly of Serbia from 2012 to 2016 and chaired the assembly's Committee on Agriculture, Forestry and Water Management and Committee on European Integration. He received a PhD from the University of Belgrade Faculty of Civil Engineering in 2025. His published research focuses on risk assessment and management in road infrastructure projects, including risk quantification, preventive measures, project complexity, and fuzzy and hybrid models for decision-making under uncertainty.

== Early life and career ==
Senić was born in Viševac, Rača, in what was then the Socialist Republic of Serbia in the Socialist Federal Republic of Yugoslavia. In 2002, he graduated from the University of Belgrade Faculty of Civil Engineering.

Since 2009, he has served as a permanent court expert witness in civil engineering before the Higher Court in Belgrade and is a member of the Serbian Chamber of Engineers with professional licences.

Since 2010, he has been engaged at the Faculty of Civil Engineering, University of Belgrade, at the Chair of Project Management in Construction, where he participates in teaching and scientific research activities.

He has served as director of the Sector for Construction Management at Koridori Srbije since 2017.

In 2025, he defended his PhD thesis at the University of Belgrade Faculty of Civil Engineering, titled Hybrid System for Risk Quantification and Management on Road Infrastructure Projects. His research has focused on risk assessment and management in road infrastructure projects.

== Research ==
Senić's research focuses on risk assessment and management in civil engineering, with particular emphasis on road infrastructure projects. His published work has addressed risk quantification, preventive measures, project complexity, extension of time, increasing contract price, and the use of fuzzy-logic and hybrid decision-support models in project management under uncertainty.

Among his publications are Development of Risk Quantification Models in Road Infrastructure Projects (2024), Predicting Extension of Time and Increasing Contract Price in Road Infrastructure Projects Using a Sugeno Fuzzy Logic Model (2024), Prioritization of Preventive Measures: A Multi-Criteria Approach to Risk Mitigation in Road Infrastructure Projects (2025), and Development of a Hybrid Model for Risk Assessment and Management in Complex Road Infrastructure Projects (2025). These studies address the quantification of risks, the prioritization of mitigation measures, and the application of fuzzy and hybrid models in complex road projects.

His research has also addressed early highway construction cost estimation and risk prediction using project complexity coefficients. Related work includes Early Highway Construction Cost Estimation: Selection of Key Cost Drivers (2023) and Risk Prediction in Road Infrastructure Projects Considering Project Complexity Coefficients (2025).

Senić has also been active in international peer review. His official faculty biography records more than 100 recorded and verified reviews for more than 20 international scientific journals and publications, and lists his membership in the Springer Nature Editorial Community – Reviewer Hubs and the MDPI Volunteer Reviewer Board.

== Political career ==
Senić served in the National Assembly of Serbia from 2012 to 2016, initially as a member of the Democratic Party and later of the Social Democratic Party. During the 2012–14 legislature, he chaired the assembly's Committee on Agriculture, Forestry and Water Management, and during the 2014–16 legislature he chaired the Committee on European Integration.

During his second parliamentary term, he was a member of Serbia's delegation to the Parliamentary Assembly of the Council of Europe from 2014 to 2016.

In June 2016, Senić left the Social Democratic Party and returned to his work at the Faculty of Civil Engineering in Belgrade.

== Honours ==
In 2024, Senić was awarded the Order of Saint Sava.
