= Judita Popović =

Serbian politician (born 1956)

Judita Popović (Serbian Cyrillic: Јудита Поповић; born 3 February 1956) is a politician in Serbia. She served in the National Assembly of Serbia from 2008 to 2014 as a member of the Liberal Democratic Party (LDP) and was a deputy speaker of the assembly.

== Early life and career ==
Popović was born in Žitište, Autonomous Province of Vojvodina, in what was then the People's Republic of Serbia in the Federal People's Republic of Yugoslavia. She graduated from the University of Novi Sad Faculty of Law in 1979. From 1980 to 1984, she was a high school teacher, a journalist for Novi Sad television, and a trainee at the Zrenjanin municipal court. She was elected as a judge at the Zrenjanin court in 1984 and served in this role for the next ten years before resigning to join the Bar Association of Vojvodina and become a practicing lawyer.

== Political career ==
=== Member of the National Assembly ===
Popović joined the Liberal Democratic Party in 2007. She received the 180th position on the party's electoral list in the 2008 Serbian parliamentary election. The list won thirteen mandates, and she was subsequently chosen for its assembly delegation. (From 2000 to 2011, parliamentary mandates were awarded to sponsoring parties or coalitions rather than to individual candidates, and it was common practice for the mandates to be distributed out of numerical order. Popović's low position on the list – which was in any event mostly alphabetical – had no bearing on whether she received a mandate.) The election results were initially inconclusive, but the For a European Serbia alliance led by the Democratic Party eventually formed a coalition government with the Socialist Party of Serbia, and the LDP served in opposition. Popović was chosen as a deputy speaker of the assembly in June 2008.

She opposed the Statute of the Autonomous Province of Vojvodina in January 2009, arguing that it did not provide the province with significant autonomy or decentralization. She travelled to Kosovo during the 2010 Kosovan parliamentary election and encouraged Kosovo Serbs to participate in the vote. According to a Radio Television of Kosovo report, she argued that Serb participation would send a message that Kosovo Serbs were willing to integrate into the society of the disputed area.

Popović was part of Serbia's parliamentary friendship with Spain in this sitting of parliament and took part in an assembly delegation to the country in June 2010. She was also a member of the friendship groups with Bosnia and Herzegovina, Croatia, and Hungary, and of the committee on the rights of the child, as well being a LDP vice-president. In March 2011, she argued that parliamentary government was not fully developed in Serbia, that most laws were passed without due consideration or scrutiny, and that most citizens were unaware of the workings of government beyond the assembly.

Serbia's electoral system was reformed in 2011, such that parliamentary mandates were awarded in numerical order to candidates on successful lists. The LDP contested the 2012 Serbian parliamentary election as part of the Preokret (U-Turn) coalition; Popović received the fifteenth position on its list and was re-elected when it won nineteen mandates. The Serbian Progressive Party formed a new government with the Socialists and other parties after the election, and the LDP remained in opposition. An early 2013 survey indicated that Popović was one of the most active members of this parliament.

The LDP's list fell below the electoral threshold for assembly representation in the 2014 parliamentary election; all of its candidates, including Popović, were left out of the parliament that followed. For the 2016 election, the party fielded a combined list with the League of Social Democrats of Vojvodina and the Social Democratic Party. Popović received the nineteenth position on the list and missed re-election when it won thirteen mandates. She is currently the second-highest ranked LDP candidate with the right to accept a mandate if another party member leaves the assembly.

=== Provincial ===
Popović has also sought election to the Assembly of Vojvodina on three occasions. In the 2008 provincial election, she ran as an LDP candidate in Zrenjanin's second division and was defeated. She later appeared on Preokret's electoral list in the 2012 provincial election and on a combined LDP–Social Democratic Party list in the 2016 provincial election. On both occasions, her list fell below the electoral threshold for representation in the assembly.

== Electoral record ==
=== Provincial (Vojvodina) ===
2008 Vojvodina assembly election Zrenjanin II (constituency seat) - First and Second Rounds
Bratislav Tomić	For a European Vojvodina–Boris Tadić	5,105	26.47	6,859	62.90
Tibor Vaš (incumbent)	Coalition: Together for Vojvodina-Nenad Čanak	4,313	22.36	4,046	37.10
Sima Baloš	Serbian Radical Party	3,265	16.93		
Ferenc Šmit	Hungarian Coalition–István Pásztor	2,138	11.08		
Milan Mandić	Socialist Party of Serbia–Party of United Pensioners of Serbia	1,674	8.68		
Dragiša Albulj	Democratic Party of Serbia–New Serbia–Vojislav Koštunica	1,603	8.31		
Judita Popović	Liberal Democratic Party	1,190	6.17		
Total valid votes		19,288	100	10,905	100
Invalid ballots		779		1,003	
Total votes casts		20,067	65.06	11,908	38.20
