= Zoltán Pék =

Serbian politician

- Pék Zoltán

Member of the National Assembly of the Republic of Serbia
- In office 31 May 2012 – 1 August 2022

Mayor of Senta
- In office 7 August 2008 – 17 February 2010
- Preceded by: Attila Juhász
- Succeeded by: Anikó Širková

Personal details
- Born: 20 December 1962 (age 62) Senta, PR Serbia, FPR Yugoslavia
- Political party: VMSZ

Zoltán Pék (Serbian Cyrillic: Золтан Пек, romanized: Zoltan Pek; born 20 December 1962) is a Serbian politician from the country's Hungarian community. He was the mayor of Senta from 2008 to 2010 and was a member of the Serbian parliament from 2012 to 2022. Pék is a member of the Alliance of Vojvodina Hungarians (VMSZ).

== Early life and career ==
Pék was born in Senta, Autonomous Province of Vojvodina, in what was then the People's Republic of Serbia in the Federal People's Republic of Yugoslavia. He was raised in the community and graduated from the Faculty of Economics at the University of Novi Sad in Subotica, focusing on business information systems. He is an authorized accountant and auditor.

== Politician ==
=== Early years (2004–12) ===
Pék joined the VMSZ in 2002. He was a civilian member of Senta's budget and finance committee in the 2004–08 term and served as the committee's president.

He received the 123rd position on the VMSZ's electoral list in the 2007 Serbian parliamentary election and the forty-third position on the VMSZ-led Hungarian Coalition list in the 2008 parliamentary election. The lists won three and four mandates, respectively, and Pék was not included in his party's assembly delegation on either occasion. (From 2000 to 2011, Serbian parliamentary mandates were awarded to sponsoring parties or coalitions rather than to individual candidates, and it was common practice for the mandates to be assigned out of numerical order. Pék could have been given a mandate in 2007 or 2008 notwithstanding his list position, but ultimately this did not occur.)

Pék also appeared in the third position on the Hungarian Coalition's list for the Senta municipal assembly in the 2008 Serbian local elections, which were held concurrently with that year's parliamentary vote. The coalition's list won a plurality victory with twelve out of twenty-nine seats, and Pék was assigned a mandate. When the assembly convened on 7 August 2008, he was chosen as the municipality's mayor. He remained in this role until February 2010, when shifting political alliances in the municipality brought the Democratic Party (DS) to power in a new administration that did not include the VMSZ. Pék returned to the municipal assembly on 15 June 2010 and led the VMSZ delegation there for the next two years.

=== Parliamentarian (2012–2022) ===
Serbia's electoral system was reformed in 2011, such that all parliamentary mandates were awarded to candidates on successful lists in numerical order. Pék received the fifth position on the VMSZ's list in the 2012 parliamentary election and was elected when the list won five mandates. The Serbian Progressive Party (SNS) and its allies won the election and afterward formed a coalition government with the Socialist Party of Serbia (SPS) and other parties. The VMSZ turned down an offer to join the government and served in a largely nominal opposition role for the next two years. Pék became a member of Serbia's delegation to the Parliamentary Assembly of the Black Sea Economic Cooperation (PABSEC) in his first term, succeeding fellow party member Elvira Kovács. He was also a member of the finance committee, (Note: Formally known as the Committee on Finance, State Budget, and Control of Public Spending.) a deputy member of the agriculture committee, (Note: Formally known as the Agriculture, Forestry, and Water Management Committee.) and a member of the parliamentary friendship groups with France and Romania.

Pék again received the fifth position on the VMSZ's list in the 2014 parliamentary election and was re-elected when the list won six mandates. The VMSZ began supporting Serbia's SNS-led government after the election. Pék held the same committee assignments and friendship group memberships as in the previous parliament and continued serving with Serbia's delegation to the PABSEC. He was also a deputy member of the judiciary committee (Note: Formally known as the Committee on the Judiciary, Public Administration, and Local Self-Government.) and the committee on human and minority rights and gender equality.

He was promoted to the fourth position on the party's list for the 2016 parliamentary election and was elected to a third term when the list won four seats. He was again chosen to serve on Serbia's PABSEC delegation and was deputy chair of the PABSEC culture, education, and social affairs committee for a time. He was also a member of the Serbian parliament's finance committee, a deputy member of the agriculture and judiciary committees, and a member of the friendship groups with Azerbaijan and Romania.

The VMSZ led a successful drive to increase its voter turnout in the 2020 Serbian parliamentary election and won a record nine seats. Pék once again appeared in the fourth position on the party's list and was elected to a fourth term. In the parliament that followed, he was a member of the finance and human rights committees; a deputy member of the judiciary committee; a member of the subcommittee for the consideration of reports on audits conducted by the state audit institution; a member of the human rights committee's working group for initiatives, petitions and proposals; once again a member of Serbia's delegation to the PABSEC; and a member of the friendship groups with Romania and Slovenia.

Pék also appeared in the third position on the VMSZ's list for Senta in the 2020 Serbian local elections, which were held concurrently with the parliamentary vote, and returned to the municipal assembly after an eight-year absence when the list won a plurality victory with thirteen out of twenty-nine seats.

He was assigned the fifteenth position on the VMSZ's list in the 2022 parliamentary election and was not re-elected when list fell to five seats. His national assembly term ended on 1 August 2022. He did not seek re-election in Senta in the 2024 Serbian local elections.
