= Milanka Jevtović Vukojičić =

Serbian politician (born 1960)

Milanka Jevtović Vukojičić (Serbian Cyrillic: Миланка Јевтовић Вукојичић; born 29 January 1960) is a politician in Serbia. She has served in the National Assembly of Serbia since 2012 as a member of the Serbian Progressive Party.

== Private career ==
Jevtović Vukojičić is a social worker and has worked for many years as supervisor of the centre for social work in Priboj.

== Politician ==
=== Municipal politics ===
Jevtović Vukojičić has served in the municipal assembly of Priboj. She was given the third position on the Progressive Party's electoral list in the 2012 Serbian local elections and was returned when the list won seven mandates. She did not seek re-election in 2016.

=== Parliamentarian ===
Jevtović Vukojičić received the seventy-eighth position on the Progressive Party's Let's Get Serbia Moving list in the 2012 Serbian parliamentary election. The list won seventy-three mandates, and the Progressive Party subsequently formed a new coalition government with the Socialist Party of Serbia and other parties. Although Jevtović Vukojičić narrowly missed direct election, she was able to take her seat in the assembly on 25 July 2012, following the resignation of party members further up the list to take positions in the new administration.

She was promoted to the forty-second position on the Progressive-led Aleksandar Vučić — Future We Believe In list in the 2014 parliamentary election and was returned when the list won a majority victory with 158 out of 250 seats. She was elected for a third term in the 2016 election on the successor Aleksandar Vučić – Serbia Is Winning list, which won a second consecutive majority with 131 mandates.

During the 2016–20 parliament, Jevtović Vukojičić was the chair of the parliamentary committee on labour, social issues, social inclusion, and poverty reduction; a member of the committee on human and minority rights and gender equality and the committee on the rights of the child; the chair of a working group on the political empowerment of persons with disabilities; a member of the commission for the control of the execution of criminal sanctions; a deputy member of Serbia's delegation to the South-East European Cooperation Process parliamentary assembly; and a member of the parliamentary friendship groups with Belarus, Bolivia, Canada, Germany, India, Indonesia, Kazakhstan, Montenegro, Russia, Sweden, Switzerland, Uganda, and the Sovereign Military Order of Malta. In September 2016, she took part in an inter-parliamentary workshop in Bucharest, Romania, entitled, "European Parliamentarians Fighting Modern Slavery."

She received the 110th position on the Progressive Party's Aleksandar Vučić — For Our Children list in the 2020 election and was elected to a fourth term when the list won a landslide majority with 188 mandates. She is now the deputy chair of the labour committee, a member of the committee on the rights of the child, a deputy member of the committee on human and minority rights and gender equality, a deputy member of Serbia's delegation to the Parliamentary Assembly of the Mediterranean, and a member of the parliamentary friendship groups with China, India, Italy, and Russia.
