= Slavica Saveljić =

Serbian politician

Slavica Saveljić (Serbian Cyrillic: Славица Савељић; born 10 December 1965) is a politician in Serbia. She served in the National Assembly of Serbia from 2012 to 2014 as a member of Together for Šumadija (Zajedno za Šumadiju, ZZS) and the United Regions of Serbia (Ujedinjeni regioni Srbije, URS). She is now a member of the Social Democratic Party (Socijaldemokratska stranka, SDS).

== Early life and career ==
Saveljić was born in Kragujevac, in what was then the Socialist Republic of Serbia in the Socialist Federal Republic of Yugoslavia. She graduated from the University of Kragujevac Faculty of Philosophy with a degree in Sociology. Saveljić worked for Zastava Automobiles from 1989 to 1997, when she was appointed acting director of the social work center Solidarnost. In 1998, she was appointed as director of Kragujevac's public corporation for recreation and child and youth recreation; six years later, she was appointed by the mayor of Kragujevac as chief expert for social policy.

== Political career ==
Saveljić was an opponent of Slobodan Milošević's administration in the 1990s. She appeared on the electoral list of the Democratic Party (Demokratska stranka, DS) for the Kragujevac division in the 1993 Serbian parliamentary election but was not selected for a mandate. She subsequently became affiliated with the Zajedno (Together) coalition at the municipal level and has served a number of terms in the city assembly. The Zajedno coalition eventually extended its reach to become the Together for Šumadija party.

Together for Šumadija participated in the 2012 Serbian parliamentary election as part of the URS coalition. Saveljić received the sixteenth position on the coalition's electoral list and was elected when the list won sixteen mandates. After the election, the URS initially participated in a new coalition government led by the Serbian Progressive Party and the Socialist Party of Serbia; in 2013, however, it moved into opposition. In the same year, the various constituent groups of the URS (including Together for Šumadija) merged into a single united party.

Saveljić received the ninth position on the URS's list for the 2014 parliamentary election. The list did not cross the electoral threshold to win representation in the assembly, and the URS subsequently dissolved. Saveljić subsequently joined the Social Democratic Party, becoming leader of its committee in Kragujevac.
