= Nevena Adžemović =

Serbian model, singer, and politician

- Невена Аџемовић

Member of the National Assembly of Serbia
- In office July 30, 2012 – 2014

Personal details
- Born: December 4, 1982 Belgrade, Socialist Republic of Serbia, SFR Yugoslavia
- Party: New Serbia (until 2014)
- Other party: Let's Get Serbia Moving (coalition)
- Occupation: Model, singer, politician
- Profession: Economist
- Known for: Member of the group Models, Serbian Parliamentarian

Nevena Adžemović (Serbian Cyrillic: Невена Аџемовић, born December 4, 1982) is a Serbian model, singer, and former politician. She was a member of the National Assembly of Serbia from 2012 to 2014 as a member of the New Serbia party.

== Early life and career ==
Adžemović was born in Belgrade, then part of the Socialist Republic of Serbia in the Socialist Federal Republic of Yugoslavia. She became a public figure in Serbia as part of the group Models.

== Parliamentarian ==
The New Serbia party contested the 2012 Serbian parliamentary election as part of the Let's Get Serbia Moving alliance led by Tomislav Nikolić. Adžemović received the seventy-fifth position on the alliance's electoral list and, as the list won seventy-three mandates, was not initially declared elected to the assembly. After New Serbia leader Velimir Ilić resigned from parliament to take a cabinet position, however, she was able to take his vacated position. Her tenure in the assembly began on July 30, 2012. For the next two years, she served as a parliamentary supporter of Ivica Dačić's coalition government, of which New Serbia was a member.

The Serbian media noted that some parliamentarians had reservations about Adžemović's qualifications for the assembly, due in part to her previous career as a model. She received support from Ilić, who cited her training as an economist and described her critics as prejudiced.

Following her election to parliament, Adžemović indicated that she had joined the Beogradski fond za političku izuzetnost (Belgrade Fund for Political Excellence) led by Sonja Licht. She identified children's rights and gender equality as her primary areas of interest. Adžemović was a member of the Serbian parliamentary friendship groups for Australia, France, Mexico, Morocco, and Turkey. She was dropped from New Serbia's electoral list in early 2014 and subsequently announced her departure from politics.
