= Katarina Rakić =

Serbian politician

Katarina Rakić (Serbian Cyrillic: Катарина Ракић; born March 30, 1979) is a politician in Serbia. She has served in the National Assembly of Serbia since 2012 as a member of the Serbian Progressive Party.

== Early life and career ==
Rakić was born in Belgrade, in what was then the Socialist Republic of Serbia in the Socialist Federal Republic of Yugoslavia. She holds a Bachelor of Laws degree and, as of 2018, is pursuing a master's degree in commercial law. She worked for the Belgrade municipality of Grocka from 2003 to 2008 and for LEMIX d.o.o. from 2008 to 2011. She lives in Grocka.

== Political career ==
Rakić has been a member of the Progressive Party since 2009 and has served on its main board and executive board. She received the fifty-first position on the party's Let's Get Serbia Moving electoral list in the 2012 Serbian parliamentary election and was elected when the list won seventy-three mandates. The Progressives formed a coalition government after the election with the Socialist Party of Serbia and other parties, and Rakić served as part of the government's parliamentary majority. She was a substitute member of Serbia's delegation to the Parliamentary Assembly of the Council of Europe from 2013 to 2014, where she served with the European People's Party group and was a full member of the committee on legal affairs and human rights and a substitute member of the committee on culture, science, education, and media.

She was promoted to the twenty-first position on the Progressive Party's Aleksandar Vučić — Future We Believe In list for the 2014 parliamentary election and was re-elected when the list won a landslide victory with 158 out of 250 mandates. In this sitting of the assembly, she was a member of Serbia's delegation to the South-East European Cooperation Process Parliamentary Assembly.

Rakić received the forty-eighth position on the Progressive-led list in the 2016 election and was elected to a third term when the list won a second consecutive majority with 131 seats. She was selected as chair of the assembly's spatial planning, transport, infrastructure, and telecommunications committee in July 2016 and held this position until the assembly was dissolved for new elections in 2020. She was also a member of the committee on the judiciary, public administration, and local self-government, and the committee on administrative, budgetary, mandate, and immunity issues; a deputy member of the European Union–Serbia stabilization and association parliamentary committee; a member of Serbia's delegation to the Parliamentary Assembly of the Black Sea Economic Cooperation (where she served on the economic, commercial, technological, and environmental committee); the head of Serbia's parliamentary friendship group with Azerbaijan; and a member of its parliamentary friendship groups with Belarus, China, Cuba, France, Germany, Ghana, Greece, Indonesia, Israel, Italy, Kazakhstan, Montenegro, Norway, Portugal, Switzerland, Tunisia, Turkey, Ukraine, the United States of America, and the Sovereign Military Order of Malta.

She received the 104th position on the Progressive Party's Aleksandar Vučić — For Our Children list in the 2020 election and was elected to a fourth term when the list won a landslide majority with 188 mandates. Rakić continues to chair the assembly's spatial planning committee, serve on the assembly's delegation to the Black Sea Economic Cooperation assembly, and lead Serbia's friendship group with Azerbaijan. She is also a member of the friendship groups with China, France, Germany, Greece, Malta, Russia, Turkey, the United Kingdom, the United States of America.
