= Mile Spirovski =

Mile Spirovski (Serbian Cyrillic: Миле Спировски; born 14 September 1956) is a politician in Serbia from the country's Macedonian community. He became the leader of the Democratic Party of Macedonians (Demokratska partija Makedonaca, DPM) in 2011 and served in the National Assembly of Serbia under its banner from 2012 to 2014. As of 2022, he is the only representative of the DPM ever to have been a member of the assembly.

== Early life and private career ==
Spirovski was born in Belgrade, in what was then the People's Republic of Serbia in the Federal People's Republic of Yugoslavia. He moved to the village of Jabuka near Pančevo in his youth, and in 1979 he graduated from the painting department at the Academy of Arts in Novi Sad. He was a high school professor in Pančevo from 1979 to 1980, taught in the primary and secondary school at Plandište from 1982 to 1994, and was director of the Goce Delčev school in Jabuka from 1994 to 2000.

== Politician ==
Spirovski joined the DPM in 2008. He was elected as president of the party's executive committee in 2010, and in May 2011 he was chosen as the party leader.

The DPM contested the 2012 Serbian parliamentary election as part of the Let's Get Serbia Moving alliance led by the Serbian Progressive Party (Srpska napredna stranka, SNS). Spirovski received the twenty-sixth position on the alliance's electoral list and was elected when the list won seventy-three seats. The Progressives formed a coalition government with the Socialist Party of Serbia (Socijalistička partija Srbije, SPS) and other parties after the election, and Spirovski was a supporter of the administration. During his term in the assembly, he was a member of the committee for human and minority rights and gender equality, a deputy member of the health and family committee, a deputy member of the committee for environmental protection, and a member of the parliamentary friendship groups with Australia, France, and the Republic of Macedonia (now North Macedonia).

The DPM was offered a safe seat on the Socialist Party's list for the 2014 parliamentary election, but it turned down the offer due to internal party divisions. Spirovski was not a candidate in the election, and his parliamentary term came to an end when the new assembly convened. He is no longer DPM leader, although online sources do not indicate when he stood down.
