= Radmilo Kostić =

Serbian politician

Radmilo Kostić (Serbian Cyrillic: Радмило Костић; born December 1, 1971) is a politician in Serbia. He has served in the National Assembly of Serbia since 2012 as a member of the Serbian Progressive Party.

== Early life and career ==
Kostić was born in Pirot, then part of the Socialist Republic of Serbia in the Socialist Federal Republic of Yugoslavia. He is a graduate economist and is president of the Progressive Party committee in Pirot District.

== Parliamentarian ==
Kostić received the eighty-ninth position on the Progressive Party's Let's Get Serbia Moving electoral list in the 2012 Serbian parliamentary election. He missed direct election when the list won seventy-three mandates; he was, however, able to enter the assembly on October 30, 2012, as a replacement for Marija Blečić, who had resigned to take a government position. The Progressive Party became the dominant party in a coalition government after the election, and Kostić served as part of its parliamentary majority. He was re-elected in the 2014 and 2016 elections, both of which saw the Progressives and their allies win majority victories.

Kostić is currently a member of the parliamentary committee on finance, state budget, and control of public spending; and a member of the parliamentary friendship groups with Greece and Japan.
