= Nenad Kitanović =

Farmer and politician in Serbia

Nenad Kitanović (Serbian Cyrillic: Ненад Китановић; born 11 June 1968) is a farmer and politician in Serbia. He served in the National Assembly of Serbia from 2012 to 2014 with the parliamentary group of the United Regions of Serbia (Ujedinjeni regioni Srbije, URS).

== Early life and career ==
Kitanović was born in Leskovac, in what was then the Socialist Republic of Serbia in the Socialist Federal Republic of Yugoslavia. He later moved to Doljevac and worked with Feniks Sting d.o.o. as a fruit grower and marketer. Kitanović has said that he entered politics to improve agricultural production in his home region.

== Political career ==
Kitanović received the sixtieth position on the Choice for a Better Life electoral list led by the Democratic Party (Demokratska stranka, DS) in the 2012 Serbian parliamentary election. He was not a member of the party but ran as an affiliated independent and was elected when the list won sixty-seven mandates. A government was subsequently formed by the Serbian Progressive Party (Srpska napredna stranka, SNS), the Socialist Party of Serbia (Socijalistička partija Srbije, SPS), the United Regions of Serbia, and other parties. In July 2012, Kitanović broke his affiliation with the DS to sit as an independent member of the URS parliamentary group. According to a URS press release, he changed affiliation to ensure that Doljevac and Southern Serbia would receive state support for development. In a later interview, Kitanović blamed communications issues with the DS leadership for his departure. In 2013, the URS withdrew from the government and crossed to the opposition.

Kitanović served on the parliamentary committee on agriculture, forestry, and water management, and was a member of an informal "Green parliamentary group." In 2013, he complained about police corruption and harassment in Doljevac.

Kitanović received the fourteen position on the URS's list for the 2014 Serbian parliamentary election. The list did not cross the electoral threshold to win representation in the assembly. He subsequently appeared at the head of a coalition list led by the Party of United Pensioners of Serbia (Partija ujedinjenih penzionera Srbije, PUPS) in the 2018 municipal election in Doljevac.
