= Mira Petrović =

Serbian politician

Mira Petrović (Serbian Cyrillic: Мира Петровић; born 30 May 1956) is a politician in Serbia. She has served in the National Assembly of Serbia since 2012 as a member of the Party of United Pensioners of Serbia (PUPS).

== Private career ==
Petrović is a retired economist based in Belgrade. She worked for several years in the banking sector.

== Political career ==
=== Parliamentarian ===
The PUPS contested the 2007 Serbian parliamentary election in an alliance with the Social Democratic Party, and Petrović received the 208th position (out of 250) on their combined electoral list. The list did not cross the electoral threshold to win representation in the assembly. (From 2000 to 2011, Serbian parliamentary mandates were awarded to sponsoring parties or coalitions rather than to individual candidates, and it was common practice for mandates to be awarded out of numerical order. Petrović's low position would not have necessarily prevented her from receiving a mandate, but the list's failure to cross the threshold rendered the matter moot.) The United Pensioners subsequently formed a new electoral alliance with the Socialist Party of Serbia.

Serbia's electoral system was reformed in 2011, such that parliamentary mandates were awarded in numerical order to candidates on successful lists. Petrović received the eighth position on the Socialist Party-led electoral lists for 2012 and 2014 elections and was elected when the alliance won forty-four seats on both occasions. The PUPS was included in government from 2012 to 2014 and provided outside support from 2014 to 2016; Petrović served as part of the government's parliamentary majority. She was appointed to the Radio Television of Serbia radio programming board in late 2012.

For the 2016 Serbian parliamentary election, the United Pensioners joined the Aleksandar Vučić – Serbia Is Winning electoral alliance led by the Serbian Progressive Party. Petrović received the forty-fifth position on their list and was re-elected when the list won a landslide victory with 131 out of 250 mandates. In September 2016, she replaced PUPS leader Milan Krkobabić as the acting director of Pošta Srbije. Workers at the state-owned corporation threatened to take strike action in November 2017; one of their demands was Petrović's dismissal as director. She was not, however, removed from office at the time.

During the 2016–20 parliament, Petrović was a member of Serbia's delegation to the Inter-Parliamentary Union Assembly and its parliamentary friendship groups with China, Japan, Russia, Switzerland, and the United Arab Emirates.

She received the sixty-first position on the Progressive Party's Aleksandar Vučić — For Our Children coalition list in the 2020 Serbian parliamentary election and was elected to a fourth term in the assembly when the list won a landslide majority with 188 mandates. She is now the deputy leader of the PUPS parliamentary group, a member of the culture and information committee and the committee on administrative, budgetary, mandate, and immunity issues, and a deputy member of the foreign affairs committee. She continues to serve in Serbia's delegation to the Inter-Parliamentary Union and is a member of the parliamentary friendship groups with China, Japan, the Philippines, Russia, Switzerland, and the United Arab Emirates.

She was dismissed as acting director of Posta Srbije on 4 March 2021, on the grounds of retirement.

=== City politics in Belgrade ===
Petrović was awarded the thirteenth position on the Socialist Party's list in the 2014 Belgrade City Assembly election and was elected when the list won sixteen mandates. She resigned her mandate on 28 May 2014.
