= Zlatko Dragosavljević =

Serbian politician (1967–2022)

Zlatko Dragosavljević (Serbian Cyrillic: Златко Драгосављевић; 8 August 1967 – c. 18 June 2022) was a politician, administrator, and mining engineer in Serbia. He served in the National Assembly of Serbia from 2013 to 2014 and held high political office at the municipal level in Despotovac. Originally a member of the Democratic Party (Demokratska stranka, DS), he was later a leading figure in the breakaway Social Democratic Party (Socijaldemokratska stranka, SDS).

== Early life, private career, and academic career ==
Dragosavljević was born in Požarevac, in what was then the Socialist Republic of Serbia in the Socialist Federal Republic of Yugoslavia. He graduated from the University of Belgrade Faculty of Mining and Geology in 1993 and received a master's degree from the same institution in 2002. In 2006, he also graduated from the faculty of service business at the European University in Belgrade. He received a Ph.D. from the faculty of applied ecology "Futura" at Singidunum University in 2011 and worked as a lecturer at the same institution.

From 1993 to 2010, Dragosavljević held a variety of engineering and administrative positions at the Resavica public coal mining company in Despotovac. At the time of his death, he was director of the Grot lead and zinc mine.

== Politician and administrator ==
=== President of the Despotovac municipal assembly ===
Dragosavljević became president of the Despotovac municipal assembly in 2004. In June 2006, he led the assembly in voting to impeach the community's mayor, Miroslav Pavković, by a vote of forty-five to two. According to his obituary notice, Dragosavljević continued to serve as assembly president until 2008.

=== Secretary of State ===
In 2010, Dragosavljević was appointed as a secretary of state in the Serbian government's ministry of mining and energy. Following a restructuring of Serbia's ministries, he became a secretary of state in the newly formed ministry of environment, mining, and spatial planning in 2011. In this capacity, Dragosavljević oversaw contracts for mining and geological research. His term ended when the DS left government in 2012.

=== Parliamentarian ===
Dragosavljević received the seventy-seventh position on the DS's Choice for a Better Life electoral list in the 2012 Serbian parliamentary election. The list won sixty-seven mandates, and he was not initially elected. The Serbian Progressive Party (Srpska napredna stranka, SNS) and the Socialist Party of Serbia (Socijalistička partija Srbije, SPS) formed a new coalition government after the election, and the DS moved into opposition. Boris Tadić later stood down as DS leader, and a split occurred in the party, with some elected members leaving to form a new parliamentary group called Together for Serbia (Zajedno za Srbiju, ZZS).

Dragosavljević was awarded a parliamentary mandate on 12 June 2013 as the replacement for Milica Delević, who had resigned to take a position at the European Bank for Reconstruction and Development. When he entered the assembly a few days later, Dragosavljević joined the ZZS group, citing disagreements with the DS's direction since Tadić's departure.

He was not a candidate in the 2014 parliamentary election. He later joined the SDS under Tadić's leadership.

=== Local politics after 2012 ===
Dragosavljević appeared in the fourth position on the DS's electoral list for Despotovac in the 2012 Serbian local elections and was re-elected to the assembly when the list won a majority victory with twenty-three out of forty-five seats. The local DS and SDS organizations ran a combined list in the 2016 local elections; Dragosavljević led the list and was again re-elected when it won eleven seats, finishing second to the SNS.

The SDS boycotted the 2020 local elections, and Dragosavljević's term came to an end that year.

=== Social Democratic Party official ===
Dragosavljević was chosen as one of the SDS's vice-presidents in February 2022. He appeared in the seventeenth position on the SDS's list in the subsequent 2022 Serbian parliamentary election; the party did not cross the electoral threshold to win representation in the assembly.

== Death ==
Dragosavljević died suddenly in June 2022.
