= Ivica Tončev =

Serbian politician

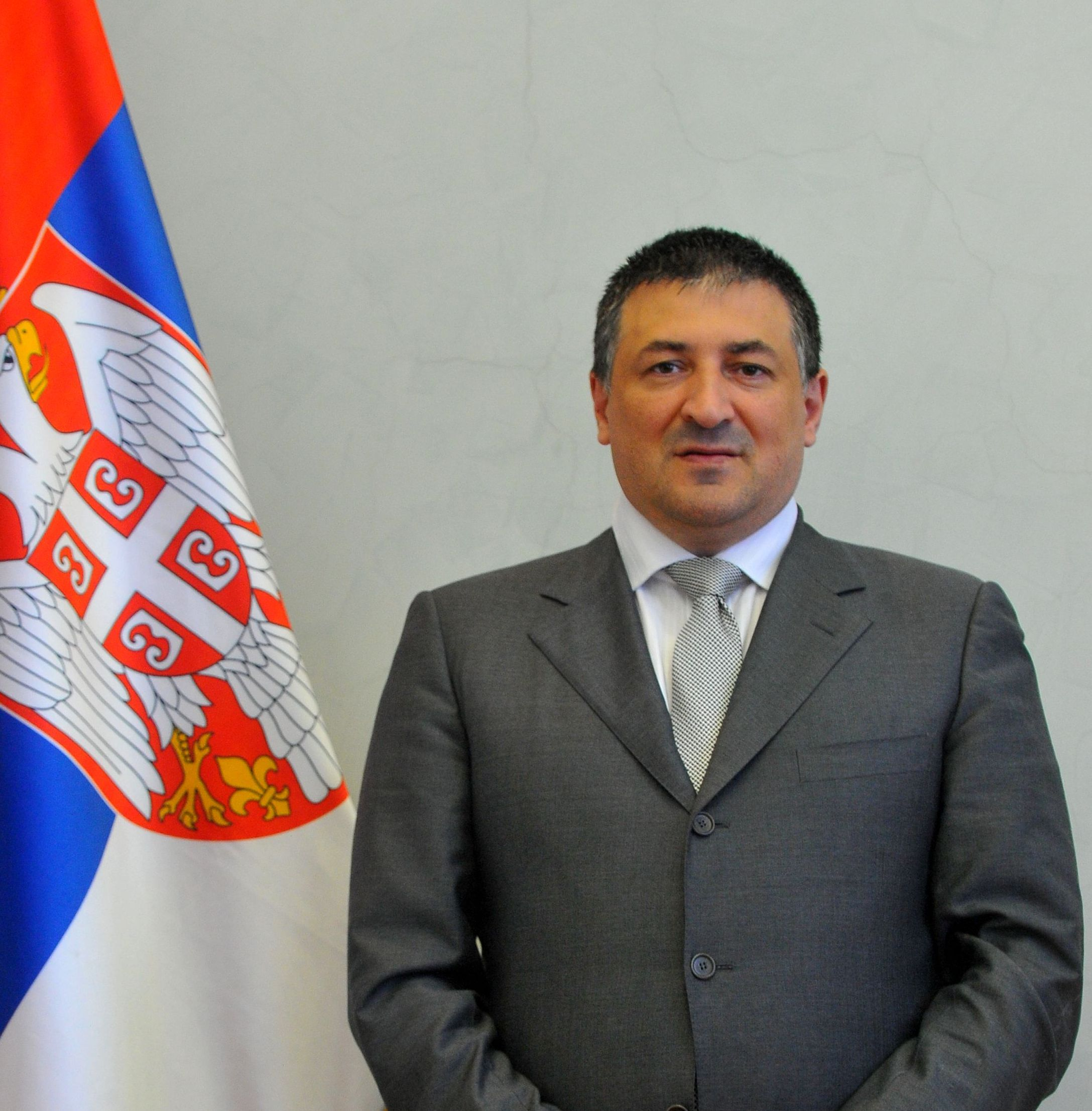

Ivica Tončev (Serbian Cyrillic: Ивица Тончев; born November 17, 1968) is a Serbian politician, member of the Socialist Party of Serbia and special advisor to Serbian Government since 2008. He serves as a special advisor of the First Deputy Prime minister Ivica Dačić.

== Biography ==
Tončev graduated and obtained his master's degree at the Faculty of management Megatrend University.

Tončev's posts within the Government of the Republic of Serbia include:

- 2008–2012: European integrations advisor of the Deputy Prime Minister and Minister of interior affairs Ivica Dačić
- 2012–2014: National Security Advisor of the Prime Minister of Serbia (Ivica Dačić)
- 2014–: Diaspora and Economic Diplomacy advisor of the First Deputy Prime minister and Minister of foreign affairs of the Republic of Serbia (Ivica Dačić).

After 2016 Serbian parliamentary election, Tončev became MP in front of the Socialist Party of Serbia, for the second time.

He is active in several committees of the National Assembly of Serbia such as the Defence and Internal Affairs Committee (member), Foreign Affairs Committee (Deputy member) and Committee on the Diaspora and Serbs in the Region (Deputy member). Since December 2016 Tončev is appointed as a State Secretary at the Ministry of Foreign Affairs (Serbia). In December 2018, Tončev participated at the OSCE Ministerial Council as a member of Serbia's Delegation.

Tončev is a former vice president of the Red Star Belgrade. Tončev was active as an official of the club since December 2012 till August 2015. Since December 2016 he is active as president of FK Radnički Niš. As a State Secretary he decided to freeze his function in the club. He has promised European games to his fans and club is on a good path towards that goal. At the end of 2017–18 Serbian SuperLiga Radnički reached third post and entered qualifications for UEFA Europa League. During two rounds the team won two games, played 2:2 against Maccabi and lost 2:0 in Tel Aviv against Maccabi.

After Radnicki's victory over Partizan in December 2023, Toncev underlined that there is no future for Serbian football if there are only Red Star and Partizan as the main contestants.

During 2013 he was under media investigation regarding his property and links to some people from the gray zone of business. Anyway all of these accusations were dismissed after checks undertaken by official anti corruption regulatory institutions within Serbia. His faculty diploma was also under some checks after some journalists wrote about possible irregularities regarding Tončev's diplomas. Ministry of education announced that there were none irregularities regarding Tončev's BA and MA diplomas.

He is one of the most influential members of the Socialist Party of Serbia with close ties to party leadership. His brother Novica Tončev is also member of the same party and is currently a member of the National Assembly of Serbia.

Tončev is married and father of three children. He and his family live in Belgrade and Vienna. Also they spend some time during the year in his hometown of Surdulica.

In Swedish circles, Tončev has become commonly known as a "hossesock" after attempting to stall a transfer of one of his players to Malmö FF.
