= Miodrag Đidić =

Serbian lawyer and politician

Miodrag Đidić (Serbian Cyrillic: Миодраг Ђидић; born 25 November 1954) is a lawyer and politician in Serbia. He has served several terms as an elected official at the federal, republican, and local levels and was a secretary of state in the Serbian government from 2007 to 2012. For many years a member of the Democratic Party (Demokratska stranka, DS), Đidić joined the breakaway Together for Serbia (Zajedno za Srbiju, ZZS) party in 2013.

== Early life and private career ==
Đidić was born in the village of Milentija in the municipality of Brus, in what was then the People's Republic of Serbia in the Federal People's Republic of Yugoslavia. He finished elementary and high school in nearby Kruševac, earned a degree from the University of Belgrade Faculty of Law, and began practicing law in 1994. Active in athletics in his youth, he was at one time the president of the Body Building Association of Serbia.

== Politician ==
=== Early Years (1990–2000) ===
Đidić joined the DS in 1990 and became a leading figure on its municipal committee in Kruševac. He was elected to the Kruševac municipal assembly in the 1996 Serbian local elections, which the DS contested as part of the Zajedno coalition. The Socialist Party of Serbia (Socijalistička partija Srbije, SPS) won a majority victory in the municipality, and Đidić served in opposition for the term that followed.

=== Federal Parliamentarian (2000–04) ===
The DS contested the 2000 Yugoslavian general election as part of the Democratic Opposition of Serbia (Demokratska opozicija Srbije, DOS), a broad and ideologically diverse coalition of parties opposed to Slobodan Milošević's administration. Đidić led the alliance's electoral list in Kruševac for the Yugoslavian parliament's Chamber of Citizens and was elected when the list won two of the three available mandates. DOS candidate Vojislav Koštunica defeated Milošević in the presidential election, a watershed moment in Serbian and Yugoslavian politics. The DOS won the parliamentary election overall, and Đidić served afterward as a supporter of the government.

In 2001, Đidić was appointed to a federal committee that investigated the 2000 death of defence minister of FR Yugoslavia Pavle Bulatović. He was the only committee member who did not endorse the final report, saying that he could not justify all of its findings.

The Federal Republic of Yugoslavia was re-constituted in February 2003 as the State Union of Serbia and Montenegro. The new country had a unicameral legislature, and its first members were appointed by the republican parliaments of Serbia and Montenegro; only sitting federal or republican parliamentarians were eligible. Đidić was chosen as part of the DS's delegation.

=== Member of the National Assembly (2004–07) ===
Đidić received the 176th position on the DS's electoral list in the 2003 Serbian parliamentary election. The list won thirty-seven mandates, and he was included in his party's delegation when the new assembly met in January 2004. (From 2000 to 2011, mandates in Serbian parliamentary elections were awarded to sponsoring parties or coalitions rather than individual candidates, and it was common practice for the mandates to be distributed out of numerical order. Đidić's list position had no formal bearing on his chances of election.) The rival Democratic Party of Serbia (Demokratska stranka Srbije, DSS) emerged as the leader of Serbia's government after the election, and the DS served in opposition. Đidić's term in the federal assembly ended in February 2004. During his first term in the Serbian parliament, he served on the committee for constitutional affairs and the administrative committee.

He led the DS's list for the Kruševac municipal assembly in the 2004 Serbian local elections and was re-elected when the list won nineteen mandates.

Đidić appeared in the sixtieth position on the DS's list in the 2007 parliamentary election and was again chosen for a mandate when the list won sixty-four seats. The DS and the DSS formed an unstable coalition government after the election; Đidić was appointed as a state secretary in Serbia's ministry of finance in May 2007 and resigned his republican and local assembly seats shortly thereafter. In the finance ministry, he was given responsibility for fiscal administration and customs administration.

=== Secretary of State (2007–12) ===
The DS–DSS alliance broke down in early 2008, and a new parliamentary election was called for May of the same year. Đidić received the fifty-third position on the DS-led For a European Serbia list; he also led the same coalition list in Kruševac in the concurrent local elections. The overall results of the republican election were inconclusive, but the For a European Serbia alliance ultimately formed a new coalition government with the SPS. Đidić continued to serve as a state secretary and so did not take a seat in either the republican or local legislatures.

In September 2009, he announced that Serbia had signed a memorandum of understanding with China for the purchase of customs scanners. The following year, he signed a framework agreement with China on a concessionary loan.

=== Return to the National Assembly (2012–14) ===
Serbia's electoral system was reformed in 2011, such that all mandates in elections held under proportional representation were awarded to candidates on successful lists in numerical order. Đidić received the twenty-sixth position on the DS's list in the 2012 parliamentary election and was elected when the list won sixty-seven seats. The Serbian Progressive Party (Srpska napredna stranka, SNS) formed a new coalition government with the SPS after the election, and the DS moved into opposition. Đidić also led the DS list for Kruševac in the 2012 local elections and was re-elected when the list won twelve mandates.

In this assembly term, Đidić was a member of the committee on administrative, budgetary, mandate and immunity issues and the committee for Kosovo and Metohija, and the parliamentary friendship groups with Bulgaria, Greece, Montenegro, and Russia.

The DS became internally divided after its defeat in the 2012 election, and in March 2013 Đidić joined the breakaway Together for Serbia party under Dušan Petrović's leadership. The ZZS contested the 2014 parliamentary election on a coalition list led by former DS leader Boris Tadić; Đidić appeared in the twenty-fifth position on the list and missed election when the list won only nineteen seats. Đidić was later the list bearer for the ZZS in Kruševac in the 2016 local elections; the list did not cross the electoral threshold to win representation in the assembly.
