= Ana Novković =

Serbian politician

Ana Novković (Serbian Cyrillic: Ана Новковић; born 13 September 1965) is a politician in Serbia. She was a member of the Assembly of Vojvodina from 2008 to 2012 with the liberal G17 Plus (G17+) party and later served in the National Assembly of Serbia from 2012 to 2014 with G17 Plus and the United Regions of Serbia (URS).

== Private career ==
Novković is a graduate of the University of Belgrade Teacher Education Faculty and works as a teacher in Kovin in the Autonomous Province of Vojvodina.

== Political career ==
=== Vojvodina Assembly ===
The G17 Plus party contested the 2008 Vojvodina provincial election in an alliance with the Democratic Party known as For a European Vojvodina. In this period, half of the seats in the Vojvodina assembly were determined by proportional representation, and the proportional mandates were awarded to candidates on successful electoral lists at the discretion of sponsoring parties or coalitions rather than in numerical order. Novković received the fiftieth position on the DS-led list, which won twenty-three proportional seats, and was subsequently granted a mandate as a representative of her party. For a European Vojvodina won an outright victory in this election, and Novković served as a government supporter for the next four years.

G17 Plus took part in the 2012 provincial election as part of the United Regions of Serbia coalition. Novković sought re-election in Kovin's single-member constituency seat and was defeated.

=== National Assembly ===
Novković received the eighteenth position on the United Regions of Serbia's list in the 2012 Serbian parliamentary election. The list won sixteen mandates. This was the first election in which all mandates were awarded in numerical order, following a 2011 reform, and she was not initially elected. She was, however, awarded a mandate on 30 July 2012 as a replacement for Verica Kalanović, who had been appointed to a cabinet position. The URS participated in a coalition government led by the Socialist Party of Serbia and the Serbian Progressive Party following the election, and Novković again served on the government side.

In April 2013, G17+ ceased to be an independent party and officially merged into the URS. The URS left Serbia's coalition government in August 2013, and its members moved into opposition.

Novković was promoted to the twelfth position on the URS's list in the 2014 parliamentary election. The list did not cross the electoral threshold to win representation in the assembly and subsequently dissolved. Several of its members, including Novković, later joined the People's Movement of Serbia. This party contested the 2016 Serbian parliamentary election on a coalition list led by the Social Democratic Party, the Liberal Democratic Party, and the League of Social Democrats of Vojvodina, and Novković received the 101st position on the list. This was too low a position for direct election to be a realistic possibility, and she was not elected when the list won thirteen mandates.

== Electoral record ==
=== Provincial (Vojvodina) ===
2012 Vojvodina assembly election Kovin (constituency seat) - First and Second Rounds
Ivana Milić (incumbent)	Choice for a Better Vojvodina	2,939	21.27	6,383	50.97
Dušan Petrović	Let's Get Vojvodina Moving	3,372	24.40	6,141	49.03
Darko Baković	Socialist Party of Serbia–Party of United Pensioners of Serbia–United Serbia–Social Democratic Party of Serbia	2,264	16.38		
Nebojša Nešić	Serbian Radical Party	1,374	9.94		
Ana Novković (list incumbent)	United Regions of Serbia	1,339	9.69		
Aleksandar Topalović	League of Social Democrats of Vojvodina	890	6.44		
Tivadar Bogoš	Alliance of Vojvodina Hungarians	882	6.38		
Igor Naod	U-Turn	759	5.49		
Total valid votes		13,819	100	12,524	100
