= Vera Paunović =

Serbian politician (1947–2020)

- Вера Пауновић
- Born: 15 December 1947; Serbia
- Died: 21 February 2020 (aged 72)
- Education: Belgrade's Higher School of Economics
- Occupation: politician in Serbia
- Known for: member, National Assembly of Serbia
- Notable work: served two terms as coordinator of the women's parliamentary network in Serbia
- Political party: Party of United Pensioners of Serbia (PUP)

Vera Paunović (Serbian Cyrillic: Вера Пауновић; 15 December 1947 – 21 February 2020) was a politician in Serbia. She served in the National Assembly of Serbia as a member of the Party of United Pensioners of Serbia (PUPS) on an almost continuous basis from 2012 until her death.

== Early life and private career ==
Paunović completed Belgrade's Higher School of Economics program in 1974–75 and subsequently worked for RB Kolubara in her home community of Lazarevac, Belgrade as a financial services manager.

== Political career ==
Paunović was a founding member of the PUPS in 2006. She became party secretary for Lazarevac in 2009 and a member of the PUPS executive committee at the republic level in 2010, serving in both roles until her death.

She was first elected to the National Assembly in the 2012 Serbian parliamentary election, which the PUPS contested in an alliance with the Socialist Party of Serbia. Paunović received the twenty-third position on the Socialist-led electoral list and was elected when the list won forty-four mandates. After the election, the PUPS joined a coalition government led by the Serbian Progressive Party and the Socialists, and Paunović served with the ministry's parliamentary majority. She again received the twenty-third position on the Socialist list in the 2014 election and was re-elected when the list again won forty-four mandates. The governing alliance of Progressives and Socialists continued after the election, and the PUPS assembly members continued to support the government.

In early 2016, the PUPS ended its electoral alliance with the Socialist Party and formed a new alliance with the Progressive Party, contesting the 2016 parliamentary election on the latter's Aleksandar Vučić – Serbia Is Winning list. Paunović received the 228th list position (out of 250). This was too low a position for direct election to be a realistic prospect, and she was not initially re-elected even as the list won a majority victory with 131 out of 250 seats. She was, however, awarded a mandate on 5 October 2016, as a replacement for party leader Milan Krkobabić, who resigned from parliament after being appointed as a government minister.

During her final parliamentary term, Paunović was a member of Serbia's parliamentary friendship groups with Belarus, China, Denmark, Finland, France, Greece, Kazakhstan, Russia, and Switzerland. She served two terms as coordinator of the women's parliamentary network in Serbia in the course of her career.
