= Stefana Miladinović =

Serbian politician

Stefana Miladinović (Serbian Cyrillic: Стефана Миладиновић; born 28 September 1981) is a politician in Serbia. She has served in the National Assembly of Serbia from 2012 until August 2020 as a member of the Socialist Party of Serbia.

== Early life and career ==
Miladinović was born in Belgrade, then part of the Socialist Republic of Serbia in the Socialist Federal Republic of Yugoslavia, and still resides in the city's Rakovica municipality. She has a bachelor's degree in politicology with a focus on diplomacy and security. Miladinović has served as head of the marketing service of Serbia's Agency of Traffic Safety and was a member of the executive committee and the main committee of the Socialist Party.

== Political career ==
Miladinović received the 150th position on the Socialist Party's electoral list for the 2007 parliamentary election and the 149th position in the 2008 assembly election. The party list won sixteen and twenty mandates, respectively, on these occasions. Miladinović could have been selected for the party's assembly delegation on either occasion notwithstanding her relatively low positions on the lists, although in the event she was not. (From 2000 to 2011, Serbian parliamentary mandates were awarded to sponsoring parties or coalitions rather than to individual candidates, and it was common practice for mandates to be awarded out of numerical order.)

Serbia's electoral system was reformed in 2011, such that parliamentary mandates were awarded in numerical order to candidates on successful lists. Miladinović received the twenty-fifth position on the party's list in the 2012 parliamentary election and was elected when the list won forty-four mandates. She was promoted to the fifteenth position for both the 2014 and 2016 elections and was re-elected on both occasions. The Socialist Party has served in a coalition government with the Progressive Party since 2012, and Miladinović has been a part of its parliamentary majority throughout this time.

Miladinović was the deputy chair of the parliamentary committee on spatial planning, transport, infrastructure, and telecommunications; a deputy member of three other committees; the head of Serbia's delegation to the Parliamentary Assembly of the Organization for Security and Co-operation in Europe; was a deputy member of Serbia's delegation to the Parliamentary Assembly of the Council of Europe, where she served with the Socialists, Democrats and Greens Group; the head of Serbia's parliamentary friendship group with Morocco; and was a member of its parliamentary friendship groups with Belarus, Canada, China, Cuba, Cyprus, Greece, the Holy See, Italy, Kazakhstan, Norway, the countries of Sub-Saharan Africa, the United Arab Emirates, and the United States of America. She was previously the chair of the parliamentary friendship group with Belarus and in this capacity met with Mikhail Myasnikovich, then chair of the Council of the Republic of the National Assembly of Belarus, in July 2017.
