= Borislav Popović =

Serbian and Yugoslav opera director (1931–2009)

- Born: 1931; Donji Podgradci, Kingdom of Yugoslavia
- Died: 6 February 2009 (aged 78); Belgrade, Serbia
- Occupations: Theatre and opera director, music pedagogue
- Known for: Director of the Opera of the National Theatre in Belgrade, founder of the Opera Studio

Borislav Popović (1931 – 6 February 2009) was a Serbian and Yugoslav theatre and opera director, music pedagogue, and director of the Opera of the National Theatre in Belgrade. During his career, he directed more than seventy opera productions.

== Early life and education ==
Popović was born in 1931 in the village of Donji Podgradci in the Potkozarje region, near Gradiška. During World War II and the Kozara Offensive, he survived the Jasenovac concentration camp, where he was marked with a camp inmate number. Following the end of the war, he was placed in the "Lepa Radić" War Orphans Home in Gradiška.

He attended the Teacher Training School in Banja Luka. At the school, his musical talent and absolute pitch were recognized by his professor Branko Smiljanić, father of opera soprano Radmila Smiljanić. Smiljanić persuaded him not to become a village schoolteacher and directed him toward higher musical education. Popović subsequently moved to Belgrade, where he graduated from the Music Academy.

== Career ==
Popović began his professional engagement at the National Theatre in Belgrade as a stage manager (inspicijent) in the Opera ensemble. He later became a resident opera director at the same institution, staging over seventy opera productions throughout his career. His repertoire included Giuseppe Verdi's La traviata, Il trovatore, Otello, and La forza del destino, Giacomo Puccini's La bohème and Tosca, Wolfgang Amadeus Mozart's The Magic Flute and The Marriage of Figaro, and Pyotr Ilyich Tchaikovsky's Eugene Onegin.

His production of Puccini's La bohème premiered on 11 December 1976 under conductor Borislav Pašćan, with set design by Petar Pašić and costumes by Ljiljana Dragović. On 1 June 1978, he premiered Gioachino Rossini's The Barber of Seville, conducted by Ana Simić, with scenography by Miomir Denić and costumes by Božana Jovanović. Performed in a Serbian-language translation, this production remained in the permanent repertoire of the National Theatre in Belgrade for several decades and was later revived by director Ivana Dragutinović Maričić. In 1980, he staged Verdi's La traviata with conductor Mladen Jagušt, set designer Boris Maksimović, and costume designer Božana Jovanović.

From 1980 to 1983, Popović served as the Director of the Opera of the National Theatre in Belgrade. From 1987 to 1988, he served as the Director of the Opera at the Croatian National Theatre Ivan pl. Zajc in Rijeka. As a guest director, he staged operas at the Serbian National Theatre in Novi Sad, as well as in Ljubljana, Sarajevo, and Skopje. He was the recipient of the BAP, BRAMS, and Anale '78 awards.

== Pedagogical work ==
In 1994, Popović founded the Opera Studio within the National Theatre in Belgrade. The studio was structured as a two-season training program providing practical stage and vocal instruction to young opera singers. Collaborators and mentors in the studio included vocal pedagogues Biserka Cvejić, Radmila Bakočević, Nikola Mitić, Gordana Jevtović, Nikola Kitanovski, and Snežana Savičić Sekulić, alongside conductors Oskar Danon, Jovan Šajnović, Dragana Radaković, and Đorđe Pavlović.

Productions staged through the Opera Studio included Puccini's Suor Angelica, Mozart's The Magic Flute and Così fan tutte, and Dragan Karolić's children's opera Snow White and the Seven Dwarfs (Snežana i sedam patuljaka). Popović led the Opera Studio with brief interruptions until his death in 2009. From 2004, he also taught at the opera studio of the Academy of Fine Arts in Belgrade.

== Death and legacy ==
Popović died in Belgrade on 6 February 2009 at the age of 78. He was cremated on 13 February 2009 at the Belgrade New Cemetery.

Following his death, the Opera Studio of the National Theatre in Belgrade was officially named the "Borislav Popović" Opera Studio. Journalist and publicist Milan Pilipović directed a documentary film titled Sava sa zvukom opere – u tri slike (also referred to as Glasovi iz Gradiške na sceni Narodnog pozorišta u Beogradu), which documents the lives and careers of Popović and Mladen Sabljić, two opera directors of the National Theatre in Belgrade who both originated from the Gradiška region.
