= List of people from Bitola =

Below is a list of notable people from Bitola, a city in the Pelagonia Statistical Region of the European country of North Macedonia. The list includes those who were born in Bitola as well as those who (have) spent a significant period of time living in the city.

== Arts ==
- Slobodan Aligrudić, actor
- Jasmina Atanasova, writer
- Nikola Berovski, translator
- Floria Capsali, ballerina
- Ajri Demirovski, folk music composer
- Slave Dimitrov, composer
- Igor Durlovski, opera singer
- Petar Džadžić, literary critic
- Petar Georgiev-Kalica, composer and songwriter
- Karolina Gočeva, pop singer
- Vlado Goreski, graphic artist and designer
- Jonce Hristovski, folk singer
- Olga Jančić, sculptor
- Kiril Makedonski, musician
- Gonxhe Manakovska, folk singer
- Dijamandija Mišajkov, journalist
- Tale Ognenovski, multi-instrumentalist
- Chris Petrovski, actor
- Gjergj Qiriazi, writer
- Ljubica Sokić, painter
- Goran Stefanovski, dramatist and scriptwriter
- Borislav Traikovski, painter
- Pece Trajkovski – Brada, musician

== Military ==
- Hüseyin Avni Bey, lieutenant colonel
- Kâzım Dirik, Ottoman Army officer and governor of Izmir
- Naci Eldeniz, military officer in the Ottoman and Turkish armies
- Rafael Moshe Kamhi, member of the IMRO
- Mehmet Suphi Kula, Ottoman general
- Anastas Lozanchev, revolutionary
- Georgios Modis, Greek jurist, politician, writer and participant in the Macedonian Struggle
- Stefan Naumov, partisan
- Süleyman Sabri Pasha, Ottoman general
- Dimitar Rizov, revolutionary and publicist
- Georgi Sugarev, revolutionary
- Tahsin Yazıcı, military officer and politician
- Hüseyin Avni Zaimler, Ottoman general
- Antonios Zois, Greek chieftain and Macedonian fighter

== Politics ==
- Julia Batino, antifascist and women's rights activist
- Toma Fila, lawyer and politician
- Nexhmije Hoxha, wife of Enver Hoxha
- Theofylaktos Papakonstantinou, Greek politician, journalist, minister of education and religious affairs
- Pande Petrovski, chief of staff of the Army of the Republic of North Macedonia

== Religion ==
- Gjerasim Qiriazi, founder of the Protestant Church of Albania
- Stephen Veljanovski, archbishop, head of the Macedonian Orthodox Church
- Jovan Vraniškovski, archbishop of the Orthodox Ohrid Archbishopric

== Sciences ==
- Florica Bagdasar, neuropsychiatrist
- Nikola Berovski, educator
- James Franklin Clarke Jr., historian
- Ljubomir Cuculovski, philosopher and professor
- Janko Konstantinov, architect
- Aleksandar Mladenović, linguist
- Mihail Petruševski, philologist and founder of the Faculty of Philosophy at Skopje University
- Parashqevi Qiriazi, teacher of the first girls' Albanian school; participant of the Congress of Monastir
- Sevasti Qiriazi, pioneer of Albanian female education
- Gheorghe Constantin Roja, doctor, philologist and historian
- Tajar Zavalani, journalist

== Sport ==
- Mirjeta Bajramoska, handball player
- Gjoko Hadžievski, football coach
- Gjorgji Hristov, footballer
- Dimitar Ilievski-Murato, alpinist, first Macedonian to climb Mount Everest
- Mirko Ivanovski, footballer
- Filip Kuzmanovski, handball player
- Miljan Miljanić, football coach
- Nikolče Noveski, footballer
- Kristijan Trapanovski, footballer
- Dragan Veselinovski, footballer
- Sašo Zdravevski, footballer
