= Borislav =

Slavic masculine given name

- Pronunciation: Ukrainian: [boˈr(ʲ)izlɑu̯~boˈrɪzlɑu̯] Serbo-Croatian: [boˈrizlaʋ] Macedonian: [bɔˈriːzlaf] Bulgarian: [boˈrizɫaf]
- Gender: Male

Origin
- Language: Slavic

Other names
- Derived: borti (battle) and slava (glory, fame)
- Related names: Borislava (f), Borisav, Boris

Borislav or Boryslav (Cyrillic: Борислав) is a Slavic masculine given name, derived from the Slavic elements borti (battle) and slava (glory, fame). The feminine form of the name is Borislava.

== Notable people with the name ==
- Borislav Abadzhiev (born 1963), Bulgarian boxer
- Borislav Ananiev (born 1955), Bulgarian sprint canoer
- Borislav Antonić (born 1964), Serbian politician
- Borislav Apostolov (born 1990), Bulgarian volleyball player
- Borislav Arapović (born 1935), Bosnian-Croatian born poet, linguist and literary scholar
- Borislav Asenov (born 1959), Bulgarian cyclist
- Borislav Baldzhiyski (born 1990), Bulgarian footballer
- Borislav Batikov (born 1959), Bulgarian modern pentathlete
- Boryslav Bereza (born 1974), Ukrainian politician
- Borislav Bešlić, Croatian murderer
- Borislav Borisov (canoeist) (born 1954), Bulgarian sprint canoer
- Borislav Borisov (footballer) (born 1990), Bulgarian footballer
- Borislav Borisov (gymnast) (born 1994), Bulgarian acrobatic gymnast
- Boryslav Brondukov (1938–2004), Ukrainian actor
- Borislav Ćorković (1933–2006), Serbian basketball coach
- Borislav Ćurčić (1932–2015), Serbian basketball player
- Borislav Cvetković (born 1962), Croatian-Serbian football player and manager
- Borislav Damyanov (born 1998), Bulgarian footballer
- Borislav Dević (1963–2023), Serbian athlete
- Borislav Dichev (born 1979), Bulgarian footballer
- Borislav Dimitrachkov (born 1968), Bulgarian alpine skier
- Borislav Dimitrov (1951–2013), Bulgarian footballer
- Boriša Đorđević (born 1953), Serbian retired footballer
- Borislav Drljača (1941–2020), Bosnian-Serbian folk singer
- Borislav Bora Dugić (born 1949), Serbian musician
- Borislav Đurović (1952–2003), Montenegrin footballer
- Borislav Džaković (1947–2019), Serbian-Bosnian basketball coach
- Borislav Gabrovski (1910–1977), Bulgarian footballer
- Borislav Georgiev (born 1974), former Bulgarian footballer
- Borislav Gidikov (born 1965), Bulgarian weightlifter
- Borislav Gutsanov (born 1967), Bulgarian politician
- Borislav Hazurov (born 1985), Bulgarian footballer
- Borislav Herak (born 1971), Bosnian Serb military soldier
- Borislav Iliev (born 1988), Bulgarian footballer
- Borislav Ivanov (karateka) (born 1977), Bulgarian karateka
- Borislav Ivanov (born 1987), Bulgarian chess player
- Borislav Ivkov (1933–2022), Serbian chess grandmaster
- Borislav Jeliazkov (born 1971), Bulgarian mixed martial artist
- Borislav Jovanović (footballer) (born 1986), Serbian football player
- Borislav Jovanović (writer) (born 1941), Montenegrin writer, poet and literary critic
- Borislav Kamenski (1911–1990), Bulgarian footballer
- Borislav Karamatev (born 1984), Bulgarian footballer
- Borislav Kiryakov (born 1963), Bulgarian alpine skier
- Borislav Kuzmanović (born 1962), Croatian football player and coach
- Borislav Kyosev (born 1961), Bulgarian volleyball player
- Borislav Marinov (born 2005), Bulgarian footballer
- Borislav Mihajlović Mihiz (1922–1997), Serbian writer and literary critic
- Borislav Mihaylov (1963–2026), Bulgarian footballer and official
- Borislav Mikelić (1939–2018), Serbian businessman and politician
- Borislav Mikić (born 1975), Bosnian footballer
- Borislav Milanov (born 1983), Bulgarian composer, songwriter and record producer
- Borislav Milić (1925–1986), Yugoslav chess player
- Borislav Milošević (1934–2013), Yugoslav diplomat
- Borislav Nikolov (born 1992), Bulgarian footballer
- Borislav Novachkov (born 1989), Bulgarian freestyle wrestler
- Borislav Novaković (born 1964), Serbian politician
- Borislav Ochushki (born 1934), Bulgarian cross-country skier
- Borislav Paravac (1943–2026), Bosnian Serb politician
- Borislav Pavlov (born 1978), Bulgarian footballer
- Borislav Pekić (1930–1992), Serbian writer and political activist
- Borislav Pelević (1956–2018), Serbian politician
- Borislav Pilipović (born 1984), Bosnian football player
- Borislav Popović (1931–2009), Serbian theatre and opera director
- Borislav Rupanov (born 2004), Bulgarian footballer
- Borislav Sandov (born 1982), Bulgarian ecologist, politician
- Borislav Slavov (born 1973), Bulgarian video game composer
- Borislav Sretkov (born 1952), Bulgarian footballer
- Borislav Stankov (born 2002), commonly known as Slavy, Spanish-Bulgarian footballer
- Borislav Stanković (1925–2020), Serbian basketball player and coach
- Borislav Stefanović (born 1974), Serbian politician
- Borislav Stevanović (1975–2022), Serbian footballer
- Borislav Stjepanović (born 1946), Yugoslav actor
- Borislav Stojkov (born 1941), Serbian engineer and university professor
- Borislav Stoyanov (born 1985), Bulgarian footballer
- Borislav Stoyanov (cyclist) (born 1904), Bulgarian cyclist
- Borislav Stoychev (born 1986), former Bulgarian footballer
- Borislav Terzić (born 1991), Bosnian footballer
- Borislav Tomoski (born 1972), Macedonian footballer
- Borislav Topić (born 1984), Bosnian footballer
- Borislav Traikovski (1917–1996), Macedonian painter
- Borislav Tsekov (born 1972), Bulgarian constitutional lawyer
- Borislav Tsonev (born 1995), Bulgarian footballer
- Borislav Tsvetkov (born 1967), Bulgarian sprint canoer
- Borislav Vasilev (born 1951), Bulgarian rower
- Borislav Velichkov (born 1961), Bulgarian wrestler
- Borislav Vučević (born 1958), Montenegrin basketball player
- Borislav Vujadinović (born 1959), Bosnian bobsledder
- Borislav Yordanov (1908–1990), Bulgarian alpine skier

== See also ==
- FC Borislav Parvomay, Bulgarian football club
- Bořislav, village in the Czech republic
- Borislava, female form of the name
- Borisav, similar given name
- Boris (given name)
- Boryslav (disambiguation)
- Borzysław (disambiguation)
- Slavic names
