= Stefan Naumov =

Yugoslav partisan

Stefan Naumov-Stiv
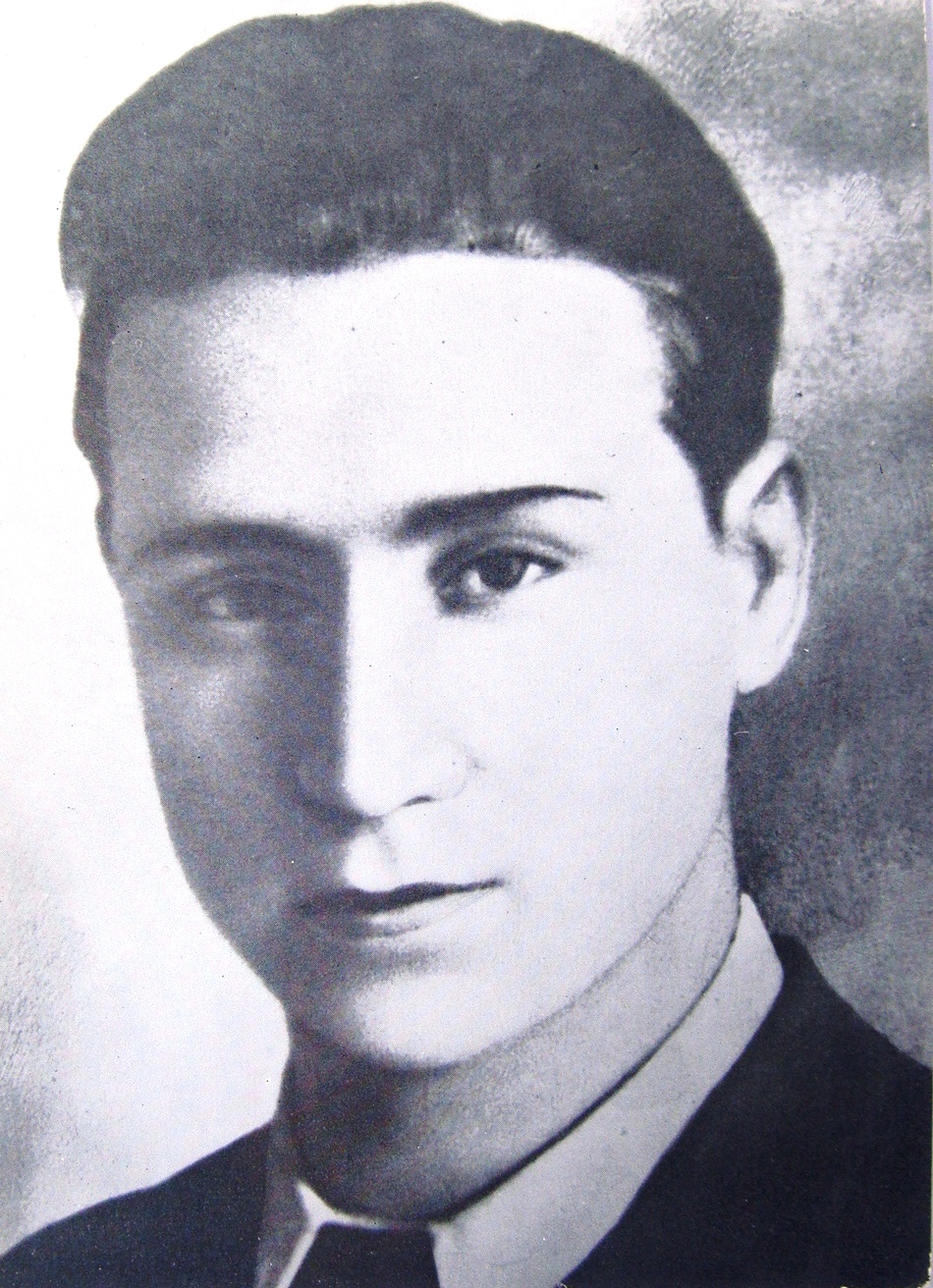
- Born: 27 October 1920; Bitola, Kingdom of Yugoslavia
- Died: 12 September 1942 (aged 21); Bolno, Bulgarian-occupied Yugoslavia

Stefan Naumov (27 October 1920 – 12 September 1942, Macedonian: Стефан Наумов - Стив) was a Macedonian Yugoslav Partisan and one of the organizers of the communist-led resistance in the Bitola area during World War II, and was declared a People's Hero of Yugoslavia.

== Biography ==
He was born on 27 October 1920 in Bitola, while his family originated from the village of Bitusha. He went to the Faculty of Engineering in Belgrade in 1938. There he befriended Kuzman Josifovski Pitu. In 1939, he was elected for a member of the Communist Party of Yugoslavia. In 1940, he was elected for the secretary of the Local committee of the CPY in Bitola. After Yugoslavia was occupied by the Axis forces in 1941, Naumov worked on the organizing of an armed resistance against the Bulgarian occupation in Bitola area. In April 1942, he was one of the organizers of the Bitola partisan detachment "Pelister", consisting of 20 men. On 3 May, the detachment was discovered by the Bulgarian army near the village of Orehovo and was completely destroyed, and on 6 May, he liquidated the Police Chief Aleksandar Kyurchiev.

Bulgarian police discovered him on 12 September 1942 during an illegal meeting with Dimitar Bogoevski, near Bolno village. Surrounded and outnumbered, they ultimately killed themselves in order not to fall alive in their enemies' hands.

The house where Stiv was born and lived is now a memorial museum dedicated to him. There is also his monument in the center of Bitola.

== Honours ==
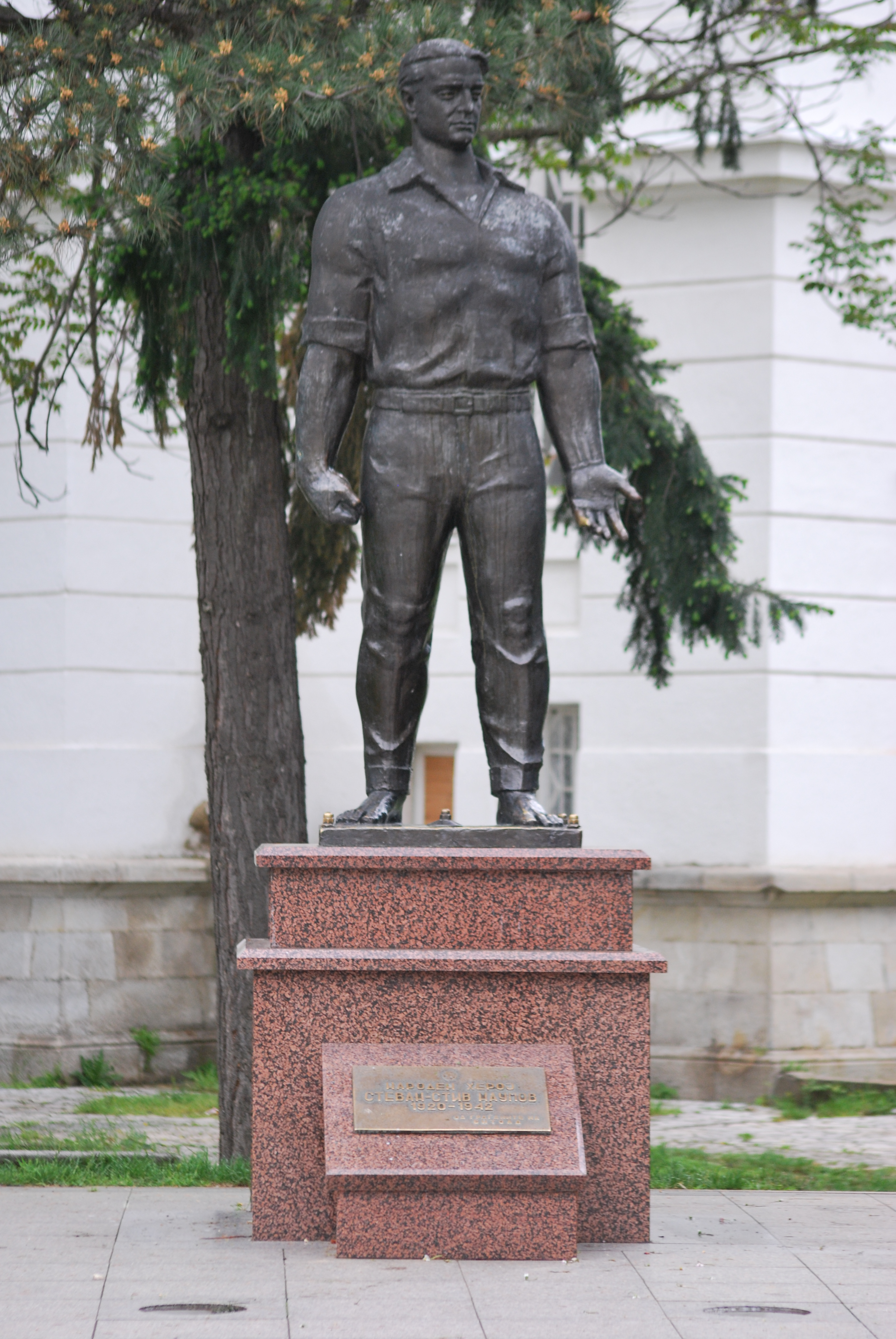
Statue of Stefan Naumov in Bitola

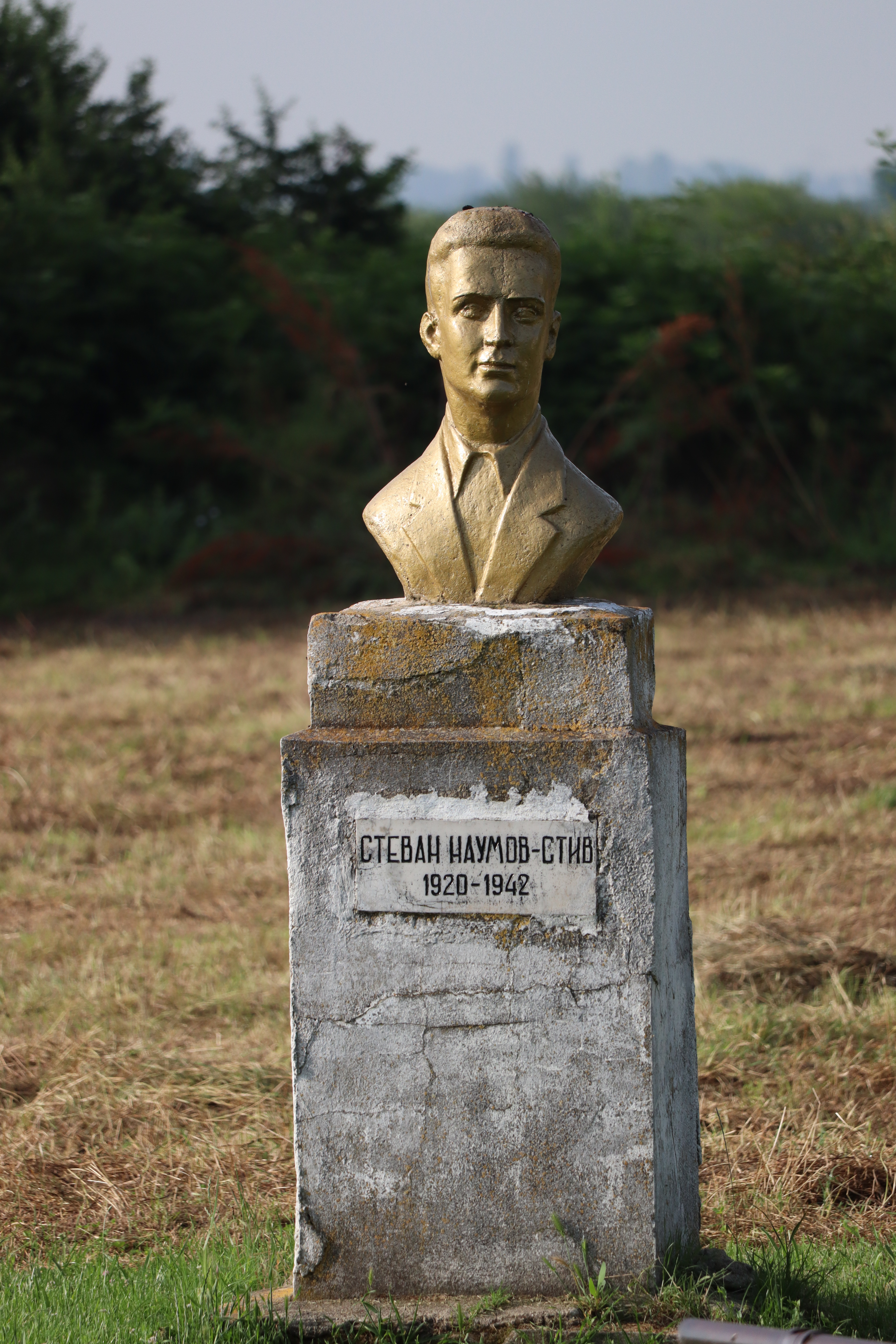
Bust in Logovardi

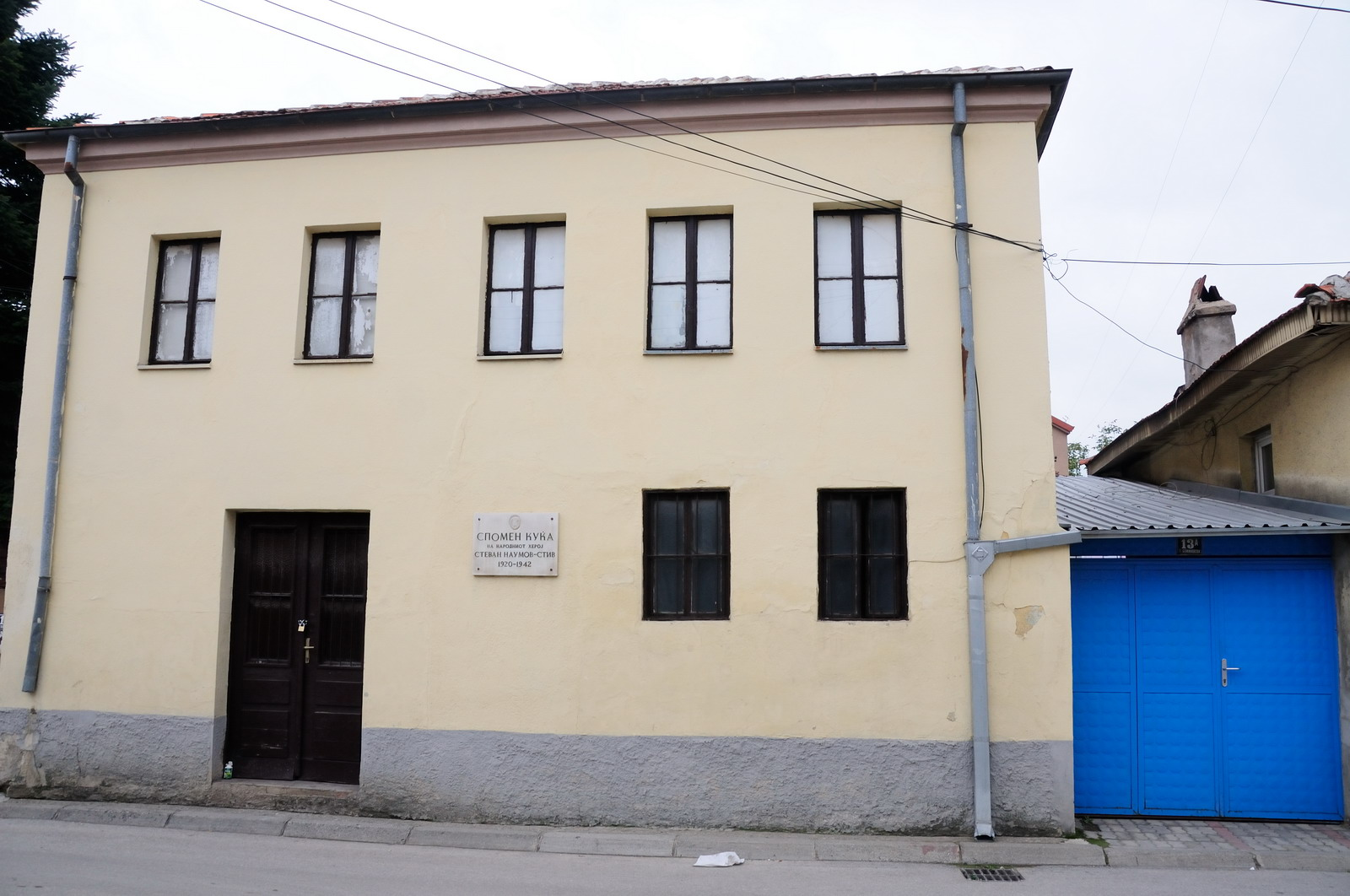
Memorial museum in Bitola

Elementary school named after him in Bitola

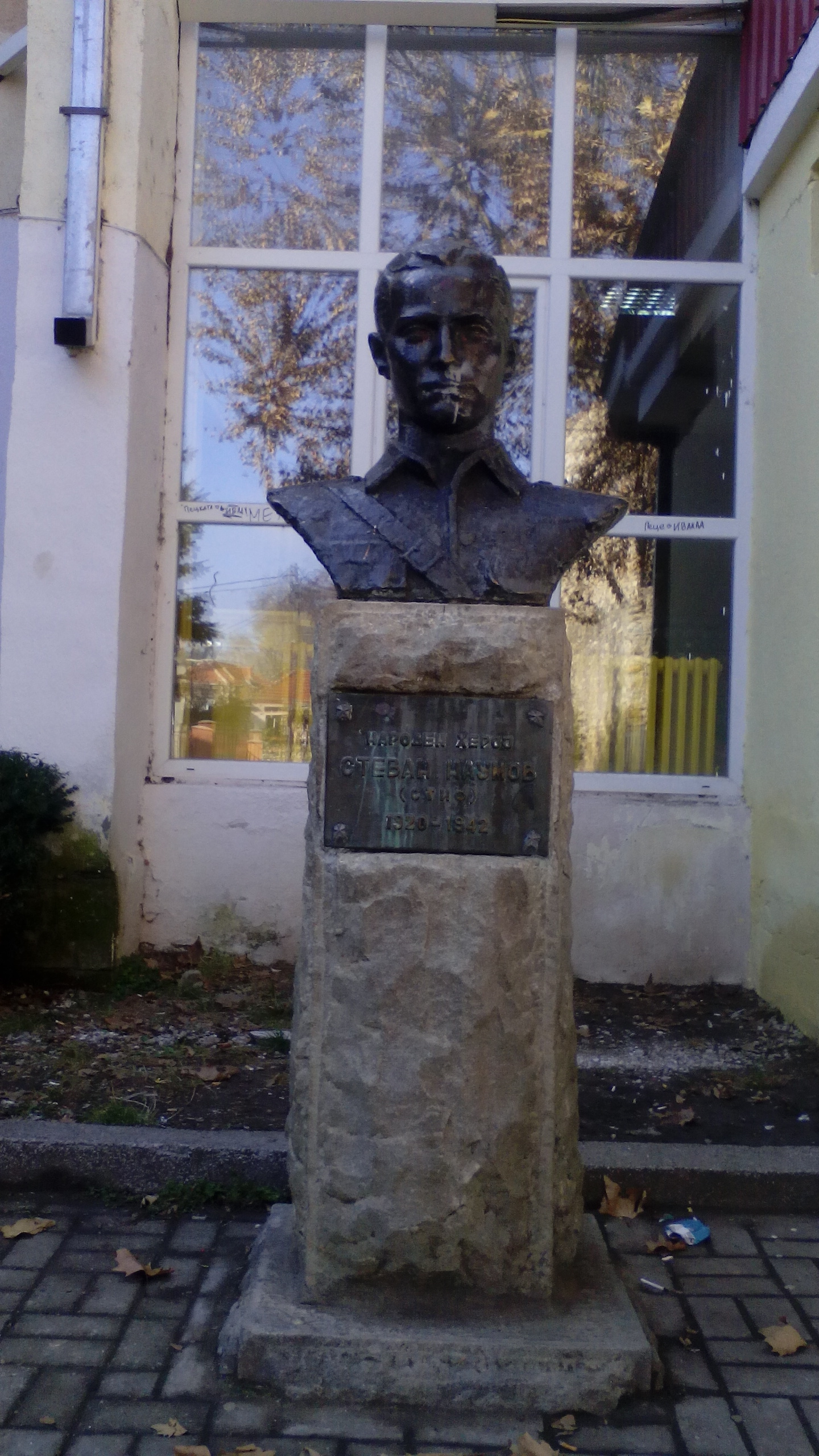
Bust in front of the school

His grave in Bitola

Memorial on the place of death near Bolno

Another monument

== See also ==
- List of people from Bitola
