= Borisav =

Slavic masculine given name

- Gender: masculine

Origin
- Language: Slavic

Other names
- Short form: Bora
- Related names: Borislav, Boris

Borisav (Cyrillic: Борисав) is a Serbian masculine given name. Notable people with the name include:

- Borisav Burmaz (born 2001), Serbian footballer
- Borisav Đorđević (1952–2024), Serbian singer-songwriter and poet
- Borisav Jović (1928–2021), Serbian economist, diplomat and politician
- Borisav Kovačević (born 1943), Serbian politician
- Borisav Pisić (1949–2015), Bosnian hurdler
- Borisav Ristić (1883–1967), Serbian military officer
- Borisav Stanković (1876–1927), Serbian writer

== See also ==
- Borislav, given name
- Boris (given name)
