= When the Dust Settles (disambiguation) =

When the Dust Settles is a 2004 album by Australian hip hop group Downsyde.

When the Dust Settles may also refer to:

== Books ==
- When the Dust Settles (memoir), a 2022 memoir by British disaster planning expert Lucy Easthope
- When the Dust Settles (novel), a 2023 Macedonian novel by Jasmina Atanasova

== Music ==
- When the Dust Settles Vols 1 (2013) and 2 (2014), albums by American singer-songwriter Jesse Brand
- When the Dust Settles, 2020 EP by American band Can't Swim

== Other uses ==
- When the Dust Settles (TV series) (Når støvet har lagt sig), a 2020 Danish TV series starring Jacob Lohmann
- When the Dust Settles, a 2009 documentary short film directed by Kimberley Joseph
