= Borzysław =

Borzysław is a Polish name of Slavic origin, derived from the Slavic elements bor ("war, fighter") and sław ("fame, glory"). The feminine form of the name is Borzysława, nicknames include Borek or Sławek. In other Slavic languages, the equivalent of this name is Borislav. It may refer to:

== People ==
- Borzysław I (died 1317), Polish archbishop

== Places ==
- Borzysław, Greater Poland Voivodeship, a village in Poland
- Borzysław, Pomeranian Voivodeship, a village in Poland
- Borzysław, Białogard County, a village in West Pomeranian Voivodeship, Poland
- Borzysław, Kamień County, a village in West Pomeranian Voivodeship, Poland
- Borzysław-Kolonia, a hamlet in Białogard County, West Pomeranian Voivodeship, Poland

== See also ==
- Borislav
- Boryslav (disambiguation)
- Borysław, Łódź Voivodeship, village in Poland
