= Roblot =

Roblot is a surname. Notable people with the surname include:

- Émile Roblot (1886–1963), French civil servant who served as the Minister of State of Monaco from 1937 to 1944
- René Roblot (1913–1992), French jurist who specialized in commercial law

== See also ==
- Roublot
