= Nataša Vučković =

Serbian politician (born 1967)

- Наташа Вучковић
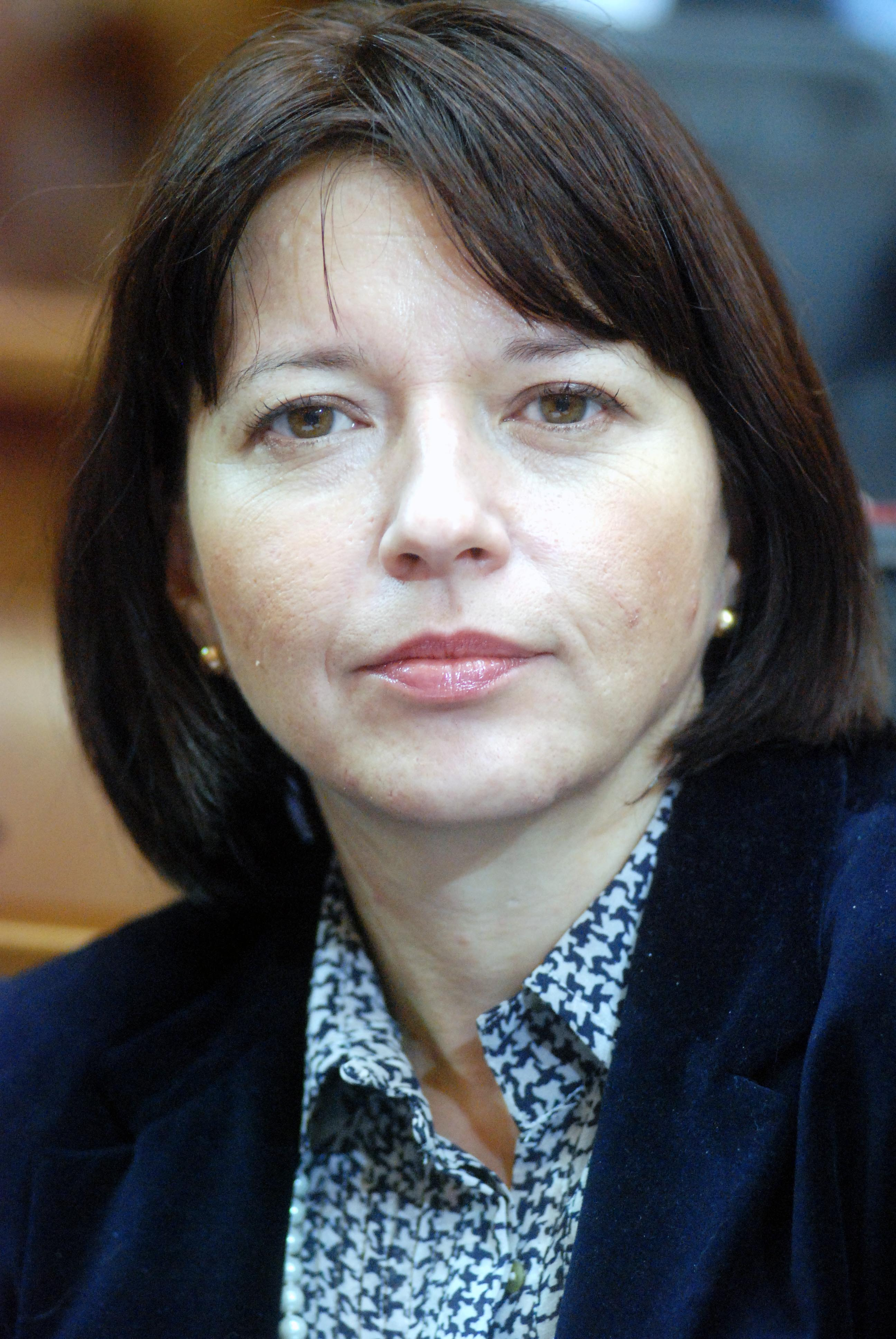
- Nataša Vučković in 2009.

President of the European Association for Local Democracy
- Incumbent
- Assumed office 13 May 2024
- Preceded by: Oriano Otočan

Member of the National Assembly of the Republic of Serbia
- In office 14 February 2007 – 3 August 2020

Member of the Parliamentary Assembly of the Council of Europe
- In office 4 April 2011 – 9 October 2016

Substitute Member of the Parliamentary Assembly of the Council of Europe
- In office 25 June 2007 – 4 April 2011

Member of the City Assembly of Belgrade
- In office 26 November 2004 – 14 July 2008

Personal details
- Born: 11 January 1967 (age 59) Zagreb, SR Croatia, SFR Yugoslavia
- Party: DS (1990–96, 2004–20); DC (1996–2004)
- Education: University of Belgrade
- Profession: Lawyer

Nataša Vučković (Serbian Cyrillic: Наташа Вучковић; born 11 January 1967) is a Serbian politician. She has led Serbia's Center for Democracy Foundation since 1994 and was a Democratic Party (DS) member of the Serbian parliament from 2007 to 2020. She left the DS in September 2020 and is no longer active with any political party.

She has been the president of the European Association for Local Democracy (ALDA) since May 2024.

== Early life, family, and private career ==
Vučković was born in Zagreb, in what was then the Socialist Republic of Croatia in the Socialist Federal Republic of Yugoslavia. She graduated from the University of Belgrade Faculty of Law in 1990 and began practicing law in 1994. She is also a graduate of the European University Centre (2006) with a focus on European Union law.

Vučković was a founder of Serbia's Center for Democracy Foundation in 1994 and has been its secretary-general since that time. In April 2012, she represented the organization in supporting the Dignity at Work for Everyone project, pledging to fight for new jobs in Serbia while adhering to the European Union's standards on the rights of workers. She lives in Belgrade.

Her father, Slobodan Vučković, was a prominent member of Serbia's opposition in the 1990s and also served in the national assembly.

== Politician ==
=== Early years (1990–2007) ===
Vučković joined the DS on its formation in 1990. From 1991 to 1994, she was the DS's secretary of the party presidency and secretary for international cooperation. After a party split in 1996, she joined the breakaway Democratic Centre (DC) under the leadership of Dragoljub Mićunović.

In 2000, the DC joined the Democratic Opposition of Serbia (DOS), a broad and ideologically diverse coalition of parties opposed to the authoritarian rule of Slobodan Milošević. The DOS won the 2000 Yugoslavian general election (which resulted in Milošević's fall from power) and the subsequent 2000 Serbian parliamentary election, and the DC participated afterward in government at both the federal and republic levels. In 2001, Vučković became an advisor on international cooperation to the speaker of the assembly of the Federal Republic of Yugoslavia. She continued in this role after Yugoslavia was reconstituted as the State Union of Serbia and Montenegro in early 2003, although her term ended later in the same year.

The Democratic Centre had effected a partial reconciliation with the DS by 2003 and contested that year's parliamentary election on the DS's electoral list. Vučković was given the 189th list position; the DS and its allies won thirty-seven mandates, and she was not included in her party's assembly delegation. (From 2000 to 2011, mandates in Serbian parliamentary elections were awarded to sponsoring parties or coalitions rather than individual candidates, and it was common practice for the mandates to be distributed out of numerical order. Vučković could have been assigned a seat despite her low position on the list, though ultimately she was not.)

The Democratic Centre merged back into the DS in 2004, and Vučković became a member of the DS's executive board in the same year.

=== Parliamentarian (2007–20) ===
==== Government supporter (2007–12) ====
Vučković received the fifty-first position on the DS's electoral list in the 2007 Serbian parliamentary election. The list won sixty-four seats, and on this occasion she was awarded a mandate. The DS formed an unstable coalition government after the election with the Democratic Party of Serbia (DSS) and G17 Plus, and Vučković served as a supporter of the administration. During her first parliamentary term, she was a member of the committee on foreign affairs, the committee on development and international economic relations, and the committee on European integration.

The DS–DSS coalition fell apart in early 2008, and another parliamentary election was called for May of that year. Vučković was given the thirty-second position on the DS's For a European Serbia (ZES) coalition list and was awarded a mandate for a second term when the list won 102 out of 250 seats. The overall results of the election were inconclusive, but For a European Serbia eventually formed a new coalition government with the Socialist Party of Serbia (SPS), and Vučković continued to serve with the government's parliamentary majority. In her second term, she was a member of the foreign affairs committee, the European integration committee, and the administrative committee, and a deputy member of the education committee, the committee on constitutional affairs, and the committee on defence and security.

Vučković chaired Serbia's parliamentary friendship group with France in this sitting of the assembly and oversaw a meeting of French and Serbian parliamentarians in Belgrade in April 2010. She remarked that the visit was an opportunity for Serbian parliamentarians to review their country's priorities, one of the most important of which was joining the European Union. She was also a member of Serbia's delegation to the parliamentary assembly of the Francophonie in this period and was a member of the friendship groups with the Netherlands and Spain.

==== Opposition member (2012–20) ====
Serbia's electoral system was reformed in 2011, such that all parliamentary mandates were awarded to candidates on successful lists in numerical order. Vučković received the twenty-seventh position on the DS's Choice for a Better Life list in the 2012 parliamentary election and was re-elected when the list won sixty-seven seats. The Serbian Progressive Party (SNS) and the Socialist Party formed a new coalition government after the election, and the DS moved into opposition. Vučković chaired the European integration committee in the sitting of the assembly that followed. She continued to serve on the foreign affairs committee and was a member of the friendship groups with France, Germany, and the United States of America.

After the 2012 election, the DS became divided between supporters of former Serbian president Boris Tadić and Dragan Đilas, who succeeded Tadić as party leader in November 2012. Vučković supported Tadić, and in a bid to ensure party unity she was elected as a vice-president at the conference that chose Đilas as leader. Vučković later supported Dragan Šutanovac's bid for the DS leadership in Belgrade; the rival candidate Balša Božović was chosen instead for the position amid deepening acrimony between the two camps. In early 2014, Tadić left the DS to create a breakaway group called the New Democratic Party (NDS), which was later renamed as the Social Democratic Party (SDS). Vučković chose to remain in the DS.

Vučković was promoted to the third position on the DS's list in the 2014 parliamentary election and was re-elected as the list fell to nineteen seats. Bojan Pajtić replaced Đilas as party leader later in the year, and Vučković was again chosen as a party vice-president. During her fourth assembly term, she was a member of the administrative committee (Note: Formally known as the Committee on Administrative, Budgetary, Mandate, and Immunity Issues.) and the committee on European integration, a deputy member of the committee on constitutional affairs and legislation, the leader of Serbia's delegation to the assembly of the Francophonie, the leader of Serbia's friendship group with France, and a member of the friendship groups with Italy, Norway, and the United States.

She again received the third position on the DS's list in the 2016 parliamentary election and was elected to a fifth term when the list won sixteen mandates. She considered running for the DS leadership when Pajtić resigned after the election, but ultimately she did not do so. In September 2016, she was narrowly defeated in her bid for re-election as a party vice-president. Vučković was an early supporter of Saša Janković in the 2017 Serbian presidential election; Janković was ultimately endorsed by the DS and finished a distant second against SNS candidate Aleksandar Vučić.

In the 2016–20 parliament, Vučković was a member of the foreign affairs committee and the European integration committee; a deputy member of the judiciary committee, (Note: Formally known as the Committee on the Judiciary, Public Administration, and Local Self-Government.) the labour committee, (Note: Formally known as the Committee on Labour, Social Issues, Social Inclusion, and Poverty Reduction.) and the committee on constitutional and legislature issues; a member of Serbia's delegation to the Parliamentary Assembly of the Mediterranean; once again the leader of Serbia's friendship group with France; and a member of the friendship groups with Croatia, Germany, Poland, Slovenia, Sweden, the United Kingdom, and the United States.

==== Opposition to election boycott and departure from the DS (2019–20) ====
Several opposition parties, including the Democratic Party, began boycotting of the national assembly in early 2019, against the backdrop of significant protests against Serbia's SNS-led government. The DS later joined an opposition boycott of the 2020 Serbian parliamentary election.

Some DS politicians who opposed the boycott (most notably Gordana Čomić) left the party to contest the election on the list of the United Democratic Serbia (UDS) alliance. Vučković remained with the DS but publicly disagreed with the boycott and expressed support for Serbia 21, one of the main UDS parties. After the election, she reiterated her view that the boycott had been a mistake and expressed concerns about the DS's overall ideological direction, particularly in its willingness to co-operate with radical right-wing opposition parties such as Dveri.

The DS expelled several high-profile members, including Vučković, in September 2020. In April 2021, Vučković said that the party's decline was a co-ordinated process that had been taking place over a period of decades.

=== Council of Europe (2007–16) ===
Vučković was a part of Serbia's delegation to the Parliamentary Assembly of the Council of Europe (PACE) from 2007 to 2016. She was first appointed as a substitute delegate on 25 June 2007 and was promoted to full delegate status on 11 April 2011. In the PACE, she served in caucus with the Socialist Group.

Vučković held several prominent roles in the PACE, including vice-president of the assembly (2012–13), chair of the committee on rules of procedure, immunities, and institutional affairs (2013–15), and vice-chair of the committee on the election of judges to the European Court of Human Rights (2015–16). For her entire term in the PACE, she was a full committee member on legal affairs and human rights. She also served terms as vice-chair (2007–11) and first vice-chair (2012–16) of the Socialist Group.

In 2013, she submitted a report (adopted by the PACE) to deprive Ukrainian politician Serhiy Vlasenko of his mandate and recognize Andriy Shevchenko in his place. In April of the following year, she announced the PACE's plans to monitor the upcoming presidential election in Ukraine, noting that it was important for delegates to visit as many regions of the country as possible.

In June 2015, Vučković was chosen as a special PACE rapporteur to Turkey, in which capacity she co-authored a report that was strongly critical of the functioning of democratic institutions in that country.

=== Local politics (2004–20) ===
Vučković has been an elected representative at the city and municipal levels in Belgrade. She received the seventeenth position on the DS list for the Belgrade city assembly in the 2004 Serbian local elections and was awarded a mandate when the list won a plurality victory with thirty-four out of ninety seats. Toward the end of her term in the city assembly, she took part in Serbia's delegation to the Chamber of Regions in the Council of Europe's Congress of Local and Regional Authorities.

Vučković did not seek re-election at the city level in the 2008 local elections but instead appeared in the seventh position on the DS's list for the municipal assembly of Savski Venac, one of Belgrade's seventeen constituent municipalities. The list won a plurality victory, and she was awarded a mandate. She was re-elected in 2012 and 2016.

She ran for re-election to the city assembly in the 2018 Belgrade city election, appearing in the twelfth position on a combined list of the Democratic Party and the Social Democratic Party. The list did not cross the electoral threshold to win assembly representation. Vučković did not seek re-election in Savski Venac in 2020.

=== Since 2020 ===
Vučković joined the governing board of the European Association for Local Democracy in 2020. She was elected as its vice-president in June 2023 and was chosen for a four-year term as president at a conference and festival held in Barcelona in May 2024.
