= Boryslav (disambiguation) =

Boryslav is a city in the Lviv Oblast of Ukraine.

Boryslav or Borysław may also refer to:

- Borysław, Łódź Voivodeship (central Poland)
- Boryslav Bereza (born 1974), Ukrainian politician
- Boryslav Brondukov (1938–2004), Ukrainian actor

== See also ==
- Borislav
- Borzysław
