= Anikó Raisz =

Hungarian politician

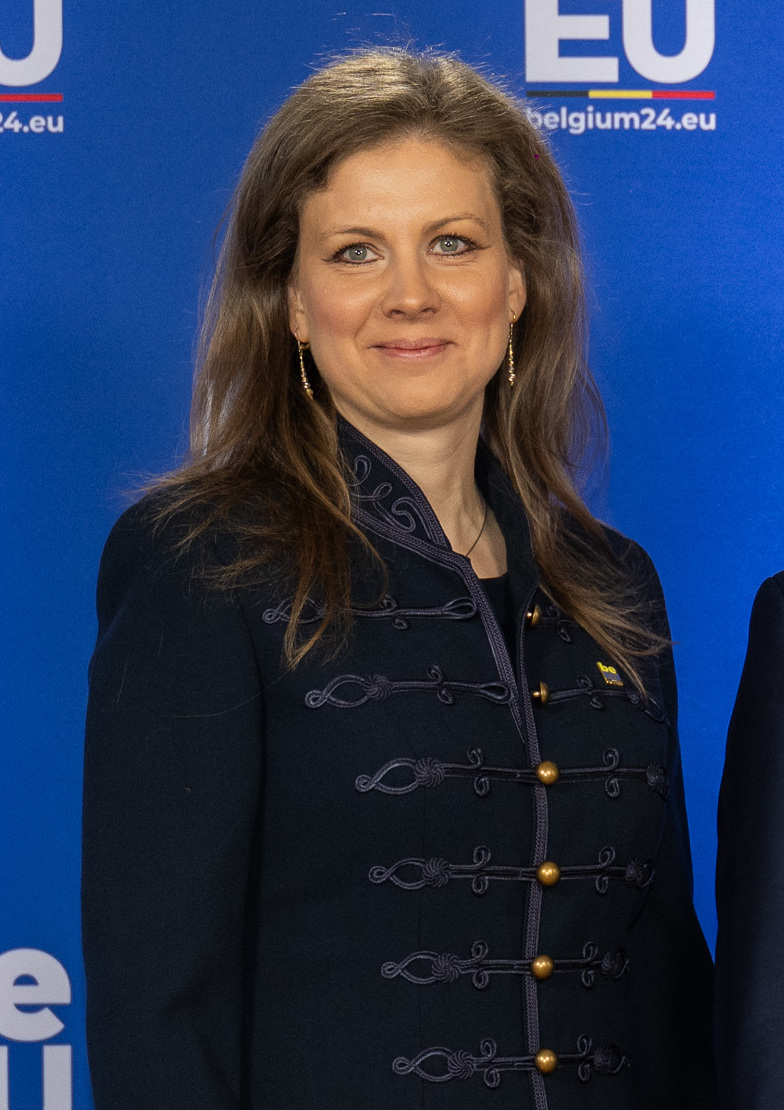
Anikó Raisz in 2024.

Anikó Raisz (born in Miskolc) is a Hungarian politician. She served as secretary of state for Public Administration at the Ministry of Justice from 2019 to 2022 then as secretary of state for Environmental Affairs and the Circular Economy since May 2022 in the fourth and fifth governments led by Viktor Orbán respectively.

== Life ==
Anikó Raisz studied law at the University of Miskolc and at the European University Centre.

She confirmed Hungary's commitment to reduce air pollution at the Council of the European Union in June 2023. She attended the Environment Council in 2023 and presented the view of her government on capping utility prices. In 2024, she opposes Poland's proposal to reduce by 90% net greenhouse gas output in 2040 and calls for realistic results.
