= Dragana Radaković =

Serbian operatic soprano and conductor

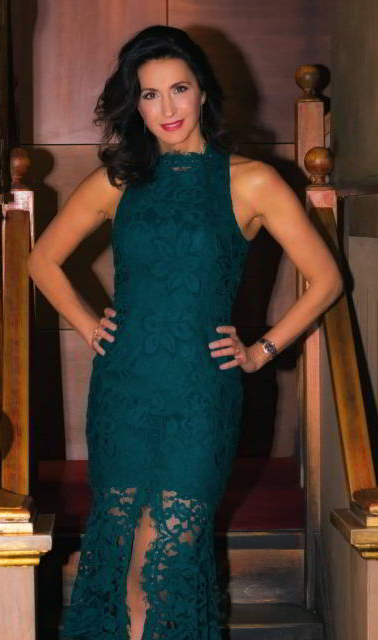
- Dragana Radakovic, 2017
- Born: April 16; Novi Sad, SFRY
- Occupations: Opera singer (soprano), conductor, academic
- Years active: 2002–present
- Website: www.draganaradakovic.art

Dragana Radaković (Cyrillic: Драгана Радаковић; born 16 April ?) is an operatic soprano, conductor and academic. With a flexible voice, she is able to sing bel canto as well as dramatic soprano roles. She has appeared at major opera houses in title and leading roles, including Bellini's Norma, Verdi's Aida, and Puccini's Turandot.

== Early life and education ==
Radaković was born in Novi Sad, at the time in Yugoslavia. At age nine, she was a winner in a television music-talent show on TV Novi Sad. She studied at the Faculty of Music of the University of Arts in Belgrade, where she obtained two master's degrees, in conducting with Stanko Šepić and in vocal arts with Radmila Bakočević. She took master classes in Italy with Mirella Freni, Renata Scotto, Magda Olivero, and Bruna Baglioni, and was further coached by Nikola Mitić.

== Early career ==
Radaković began performing in concerts during her studies. She made her opera stage debut, also during her student years, at the National Theatre in Belgrade, appearing in the roles of Cherubino in Mozart's Le Nozze de Figaro, First Lady in Die Zauberflöte, Tebaldo in Verdi's Don Carlo, Mary Warren in Ward's The Crucible and Musetta in Puccini's La bohème. She became a member of the ensemble in 2002.

== Soprano career ==
Radaković's first role as a member of the National Theatre was Abigaille in Verdi's Nabucco. Praised in reviews, her Abigaille interpretation has been in significant and steady demand ever since – during 2019 alone she had 29 Nabucco performances.

Soon after her debut, she received invitations to perform as a guest artist at other opera houses, and expanded her repertoire singing Rosalinde in Die Fledermaus by Johann Strauss II in 2004 and Odabella in Verdi's Attila in 2005 at the Serbian National Theatre, and Marguerite in Gounod's Faust in 2006 at the Maribor Slovene National Theatre. In the following year she added the roles of Leonora in Verdi's Il Trovatore, Sylvia in Kálmán's Die Csárdásfürstin and the soprano soloist in Beethoven's 9th Symphony.

She started performing at opera houses throughout Europe in 2008. She was a soprano soloist at the Palau de les Arts Reina Sofia in a Puccini concert conducted by Placido Domingo. In 2009 she appeared as Leonora in Verdi's La forza del destino and as Aida. In 2011, she sang the title role of Puccini's Tosca at the Romanian National Opera, Cluj-Napoca and the title role of Cilea's Adriana Lecouvreur at the Opera Timișoara.

Donna Anna in Mozart's Don Giovanni was her new role for 2012, in a production that went on European tour, with performances in Timisoara, Munich, Dortmund, Wolfsburg, Saarbrücken, and Frankfurt. In the same year, as a soprano soloist, she sang at several opera festivals and concerts in Timisoara, Sibiu, Constanța, Hunedoara, Tilburg, Brugge, Breda, and The Hague.

In 2013, she appeared as Bellini's Norma at the Croatian National Theatre in Osijek and as Desdemona in Verdi's Otello in Craiova. During that year she performed her roles at opera halls in Europe, at Opera Timișoara as Leonora in Il Trovatore, at the Summer Festival in Schwerin as Abigaille in Nabucco, in the Giuseppe Verdi 200th anniversary concert with the Zurich Kammerphilharmonie and debuted as a soprano soloist in Mozart's Requiem at the Athenaeum.

In 2014, she was invited to Egypt to perform Aida at the location where it was premiered in 1871, the Cairo Opera House. That year she also sang Verdi's Requiem in Cluj and Puccini's Turandot at Opera Timișoara for the first time. Turandot was to become her new signature role.

During the following year, she appeared for the first time as Desdemona in Otello at the Festival Maria Bieshu in Moldova, followed by performing as Tosca for the first time at the Hungarian Opera.

During 2016 she performed the title role in a premiere of Puccini's Turandot in Sydney, Australia. The Handa Opera's spectacular new production of Turandot was staged by Opera Australia on Sydney Harbour with a budget of $12 million. Turandot was conducted by Brian Castles-Onion, directed and choreographed by Chen Shi-Zheng, set and costumes designed by Dan Potra, with Riccardo Massi as Calàf and Hyeseoung Kwon as Liù. After fourteen Turandot performances in Sydney, she went to Macao to perform the same role in another premiere of a new Turandot production, conducted by Lu Jia, directed by Giancarlo del Monaco, stage and costumes designed by William Orlandi, with Rudy Park and Jorge de León as Calaf and Lana Kos as Liu. In the autumn of 2016 she appeared for the first time in mainland China, in her new role of Santuzza in Mascagni's Cavalleria rusticana directed by Giancarlo del Monaco at the Beijing Performing Arts Centre. She finished the year in Sydney as a soprano soloist at the New Year's Eve Gala concert held in the Sydney Opera House.

After performing in several opera houses in Europe as Norma, Tosca, Santuzza, Aida, and Leonora (Il Trovatore), Radakovic returned to Australia in 2017 for premiere performances in the role of Santuzza in Mascagni's Cavalleria rusticana with Opera Australia at the Sydney Opera House and Arts Centre Melbourne, in a new production conducted by Andrea Licata, directed by Damiano Michieletto, Andy Morto and Rodula Gaitanou, with Diego Torre as Turiddu and Sian Pendry as Lola. At the end of 2017, she sang excerpts from her new title role, Catalani's La Wally, in a concert at the Sava Centar hall in Belgrade.

In 2018, she returned to Egypt in the title role of Verdi's Aida, in a grand spectacle, the 150th anniversary. The open-air production was staged under the stars at the historic complex of the Pyramids at Giza, with massive props and 300 extras on stage. Aida was conducted by David Crescenzi, with the Cairo Symphony Orchestra and Dario di Vietri as Radames. During the same year she sang at several concerts as a soprano soloist: "Verdi's and Pucinni's arias" in Opera Nice, Gala anniversary Corneliu Murgu at Opera Timișoara, 60th anniversary RTS at Tašmajdan Stadium in Belgrade, and in Sibiu for the first time in Verdi's Requiem as the soprano soloist. The same year she also performed for the first time at the Bolshoi Theater Belarus in the title role of Tosca, with Akhmed Agadi as Cavaradossi, conducted by Gianluca Marciano. Her new opera role in 2018 was Elisabetta di Valois in Verdi's Don Carlo at Sala Mare, in the production conducted by Tiberiu Soare, directed by Mario De Carlo, with Adrian Dumitry as Don Carlo.

Radakovic returned for the 2019 season to the Sydney Opera House with Opera Australia in the title role in Puccini's Turandot, in the production conducted by Tahu Matheson, directed and choreographed by Graeme Murphy, Matthew Barclay and Kim Walker, with tenors Yongoon Lee and Andeka Gorrotxategi in the role of Calaf, and Mariana Hong as Liù. After the Sydney appearances, Radakovic was invited to Taiwan to perform as Turandot in the opening performance of the new landmark building, the largest performing arts centre in the world, built in Kaohsiung. Puccini's Turandot was staged in the opera hall with more than 2,200 seats, in co-operation with the Deutsche Oper am Rhein, conducted by Chien Wen-pin, directed by Huan-Hsiung Li and Jeremy Chang, with Zoran Todorovich as Calaf and Anke Krabbe as Liù. During 2019 she performed with several opera companies in Europe in Norma, Turandot, and in a new production of Verdi's Nabucco in Braunschweig conducted by Srba Dinić, directed by Klaus Christian Schreiber and Sarah Grahneis. She also returned to France and Egypt that year, as a soloist in the "Art for Life" gala charity concert "Lyrique" at Opéra de Nice, and in the under-the-stars gala concert "Essence of Aida" at the Temple of Isis at Philae in Aswan.

The COVID-19 pandemic largely impacted 2020. Before the worldwide cancellation of all further performances, Radakovic performed in a new production of Turandot, in the title role at the Bucharest Opera.

== Teaching ==
Radaković has been associate professor of Conducting at the University of Arts in Belgrade since 2009 and also head of the university's Opera Studio.

== Recorded works ==
- Turandot: Handa Opera on Sydney Harbour, Opera Australia and ABC Classics. OCLC: 980870794
- Handa Opera on Sydney Harbour: The Greatest Hits, ABC Classics. OCLC: 1099054834
