= Slobodan Vučković =

Serbian politician

Slobodan Vučković (Serbian Cyrillic: Слободан Вучковић; born 30 September 1941) is a lawyer and former politician in Serbia. He was a prominent opponent of Slobodan Milošević's government in the 1990s and served for three terms in the National Assembly of Serbia. Vučković was at different times a member of the Democratic Party (Demokratska stranka, DS) and the Democratic Centre (Demokratski centar, DC).

== Early life and career ==
Vučković was born in Belgrade, in what was then the Territory of the Military Commander in the Axis occupation of Serbia. He was raised in the city after the liberation of Serbia and the establishment of the Federal People's Republic of Yugoslavia. Vučković graduated from the University of Belgrade Faculty of Law in 1964 and took postgraduate studies in France and the United States of America. After working as a court trainee in Zagreb, Croatia, from 1966 to 1969, he returned to Belgrade and began his own practice. He initially worked as a criminal defence lawyer; his focus later shifted to international commercial law.

His daughter Nataša Vučković is also a prominent politician in Serbia.

== Politician ==
=== In the Socialist Republic of Serbia (1986–90) ===
Vučković was elected to the City Assembly of Belgrade in the 1986 Serbian local elections. During this period, a number of seats in Yugoslavia's legislative bodies were reserved for representatives of different professions and occupations; Vučković received a seat on the nomination of the Belgrade Bar Association. He was not a member of the League of Communists of Serbia, which was the only legal political party at the time, but instead served as an independent delegate.

After completing his term in the city assembly, he was elected to the national assembly in the 1989 parliamentary election as the nominee of the Serbian Bar Association and social organizations in Belgrade. He contributed to a law barring the League of Communists from operating through Serbia's labour organizations, and in 1990 he was one of only six delegates to vote against the adoption of a new constitution favoured by Milošević.

Vučković was the Democratic Party's first member of the national assembly; he joined the DS when multi-party politics was re-introduced to Serbia in 1990.

=== Opposition to the Milošević administration (1990–2000) ===
Serbia's electoral system was revised prior to the 1990 parliamentary election, such that all delegates were elected by popular vote in single-member constituencies. Vučković was re-elected for the central Belgrade division of Savski Venac. Milošević's Socialist Party of Serbia (Socijalistička partija Srbije, SPS) won a majority victory, and Vučković served as a member of the opposition. He was a member of the foreign affairs committee and took part in delegations to the European Parliament and the Council of Europe, as well as to Greece and the Czech Republic. He also served on the justice committee and on a special committee that investigated the 1991 protests in Belgrade; this committee's report led to the resignation of interior minister Radmilo Bogdanović. In December 1991, Vučković suggested including Slovene and Croatian business leaders in negotiations to end the Croatian War, given the importance of those countries to Serbia's economy.

For the 1992 Serbian parliamentary election, Serbia abandoned single-member electoral divisions and adopted a system of proportional representation. Vučković led the DS's electoral list in the Smederevo division; the list did not cross the electoral threshold to win any mandates, and his parliamentary term ended when the new assembly convened in early 1993. He was, however, elected to the Savski Venac municipal assembly in the concurrent December 1992 Serbian local elections.

He was given the tenth position on the DS's list for Belgrade in the 1993 parliamentary election and was not given a new mandate when the list won eight seats. (From 1992 to 2000, Serbia's electoral law stipulated that one-third of parliamentary mandates would be assigned to candidates on successful lists in numerical order, while the remaining two-thirds would be distributed amongst other candidates at the discretion of sponsoring parties or coalitions. Vučković could have been given a mandate despite his list position, but he was not.)

Vučković opposed the DS's policy direction after Zoran Đinđić became party leader in January 1994, and he resigned from his positions in the party in March of the same year. He left the DS entirely in February 1995 and joined the Democratic Centre in 1997, later serving on its presidency. He was also a co-founder of Serbia's Center for Democracy Foundation and Forum for International Relations in this period, and served for a time as vice-president of the latter organization.

In 2000, the DC participated in the Democratic Opposition of Serbia (Demokratska opozicija Srbije, DOS), a broad and ideologically diverse coalition of parties opposed to Milošević's administration. DOS candidate Vojislav Koštunica defeated Milošević in the 2000 Yugoslavian presidential election, a watershed moment in Serbian and Yugoslavian politics. Vučković was elected to a second term in the Savski Venac assembly in the concurrent 2000 Serbian local elections as a DOS candidate. In December 2001, he was appointed to the management board of Naftna Industrija Srbije.

=== After the fall of Milošević (2000–07) ===
Serbia's electoral system was reformed once again in 2000, such that the entire country became a single electoral division and all mandates were awarded to candidates on successful lists at the discretion of the sponsoring parties and coalitions, irrespective of numerical order. The DC had effected a partial reconciliation with the DS by 2003 and contested that year's parliamentary election on the DS's list. Vučković was given the 229th position; the list won thirty-seven mandates, and he was included in the DC's delegation when the new assembly convened in early 2004. The rival Democratic Party of Serbia (Demokratska stranka Srbije, DSS) became the leading party in Serbia's coalition government after the election, and both the DS and DC served in opposition. After a gap of eleven years, Vučković rejoined both the foreign affairs committee and the justice committee; he also served on the committee on economic reforms.

The Democratic Centre formally merged back into the Democratic Party in 2004, and Vučković once again served as a DS delegate in the assembly. He did not seek re-election in 2007. He remained a member of the party's main board until 2010, when he retired from political life.

== Electoral record ==
=== National Assembly of Serbia ===
1990 Serbian parliamentary election: Savski Venac
Candidate	Party
Smilja Blažin	Citizens' Group
Slobodan Vučković (incumbent) (***WINNER***)	Democratic Party
Janko Dučić	People's Radical Party
Branko Zagorac	Serbian National Renewal
Dr. Leon Kojen	Democratic Forum
Ljiljana Bojanić Kontić	Serbian Renewal Movement
Aleksandar Kraus	Union of Reform Forces of Yugoslavia in Serbia
Darinka Matić Marović	Socialist Party of Serbia
Milan Čekerevac	Green Party
Total
