= Suzanne Bastid =

French lecturer (1906–1995)

Suzanne Basdevant Bastid
- Born: Suzanne Marie Berthe Basdevant; 15 August 1906; Rennes, France
- Died: 2 March 1995 (aged 88); Paris, France
- Occupation: Law professor

Suzanne Basdevant Bastid (15 August 1906 – 2 March 1995) was a French professor of law who specialized in international public law. She became a widely respected authority, lectured in many institutions, was for 30 years professor at the Faculty of Law of Paris (Paris II after 1971) and was a judge in the International Court of Justice. She was the first woman to become professor of law in France and the first woman to be a member of the Institut de France, which is the most prestigious learned society of France.

== Life ==
Suzanne Marie Berthe Basdevant was born in Rennes, Brittany, on 15 August 1906. Her father was Jules Basdevant, a professor at the Rennes faculty of law. She was the oldest of seven children. In 1918 the family moved to Paris, where Jules Basdevant taught public international law. Suzanne studied at the Lyceé Fénelon in Paris, then began to study law.

Basdevant obtained a doctorate in law in 1930 for a thesis on international civil servants. This was the first major work on this subject. It has come to be viewed as a standard work. She defined an international civil servant as a functionary appointed and directed by representatives of several states, or by an organization acting in their name following an inter-state agreement, who acts under special legal rules exclusively in the interests of these states. Basdevant stated that the most appropriate basis for the contract between international public servants and the body that employs them is public administrative law. This theory has since been upheld many times.

In 1932 Basdevant was third in the concours d'agrégation for public law, and the first woman to join the Faculty of Law. She taught public international law and other subjects at the Lyon faculty of law from 1933 to 1946. Basdevent married Paul Bastid in 1937, a professor on the Paris law faculty. Bastid was Minister of Commerce at the time of their marriage. They had three daughters and a son, who died. She remained in Lyon during World War II (1939–45), and taught international law at the École Libre des Sciences Politiques, which had moved to Lyon from Paris. During the German occupation her husband was a member of the National Council of the Resistance.

In 1946 Suzanne Bastid was appointed to the Faculty of Law of Paris (University of Paris) where she was a faculty member in international law until 1977–78 (Paris II from 1971), when she retired. She also gave lectures at the Paris Institute of Political Studies She became well known as an authority on international law, and was invited to lecture in various leading institutions around the world. She was a member of the Centre national de la recherche scientifique (CNRS) from 1948 to 1966 in the section of political and juridical studies. She founded the CNRS journal L'Annuaire français de droit internationale publique in 1955, and was the journal's chief editor. Bastid stated in public that she was against the European Defence Community (EDC) treaty. For this reason, she was replaced at the Stresa congress on the European Coal and Steel Community in May–June 1957 by René Roblot.

Bastid taught in New York and Beijing, and undertook missions in Egypt, Poland, Portugal, Uruguay, Morocco, Lebanon and Taiwan. She was a member of the French delegation to the General Assembly of the United Nations from 1949 to 1957. She sat on the administrative tribunal of the United Nations, and was a judge at the International Court of Justice in a dispute between Tunisia and Libya in 1982. Paul Bastid died on 29 October 1974 at the age of 82. Suzanne Bastid died in Paris on 2 March 1995 at the age of 88.

== Publications ==
- Suzanne Basdevant (1930). La Condition juridique des fonctionnaires internationaux (in French). Thèse pour le doctorat. Université de Paris. Faculté de droit. Paris: Recueil Sirey. p. 335.
- Suzanne Basdevant (1931). Les Fonctionnaires internationaux (in French). Gilbert Gidel, preface. Paris: Libr. du 'Recueil Sirey'. p. 335.
- Suzanne Bastid (1947). Droit international public (in French). Paris: les Cours de droit.
- Suzanne Bastid (1948). Droit international (in French). Paris: Institut d'études politiques. p. 88.
- Suzanne Bastid (1949). Droit des gens (in French). Paris: les Cours de droit.
- Suzanne Bastid (July–December 1949). "Le rattachement de Tende et de La Brigue". Revue générale de droit international public (in French) (3–4). Paris: A. Pedone: 321–340.
- Suzanne Bastid (1949). Cours de droit international public (in French). Paris: les Cours de droit. p. 670.
- Suzanne Bastid (1952). La jurisprudence de la Cour internationale de justice (in French). Paris: Librairie du Recueil Sirey.
- Suzanne Bastid (1953). Cours de contentieux administratif (in French). Paris: les Cours de droit. p. 260.
- Suzanne Bastid (1953). Comparaison des démocraties d'Europe occidentale et des démocraties d'Europe orientale: Les moyens juridiques de réalisation de la coexistence pacifique des Etats en Europe (in French). Nancy: Centre européen universitaire. p. 58.
- Suzanne Bastid (1954). Droit des gens, le droit des crises internationales (in French). Paris: les Cours de droit. p. 377.
- Suzanne Bastid (October–December 1955). "Le Rôle de l'Europe aux Nations Unies". Revue générale de droit international public (in French) (4). Paris: A. Pedone: 24.
- Suzanne Bastid (1956). Cours d'institutions internationales (in French). Paris: les Cours de droit. p. 476.
- Suzanne Bastid (1957). Droit des gens, principes généraux (in French). Paris: les Cours de droit.
- Suzanne Bastid (1958). Cours de droit international public approfondi (in French). Paris: les Cours de droit. p. 656.
- Suzanne Bastid (1961). "L'arbitrage international". Juris-classeur de Droit International (in French). 245–249: 95.
- Suzanne Bastid (1968). Droit international public, le droit des organisations internationales (in French). Paris: les Cours de droit. p. 442.
- Suzanne Bastid (1972). Notice sur la vie et les travaux de Gabriel Le Bras 1811–1970 (in French). Paris: Institut de France. p. 24.
- Suzanne Bastid (1985). Les Traités dans la vie internationale: conclusion et effets (in French). Paris: Economica. p. 303.

== Sources ==
- Bailleux, Julie (2010), "How Europe became law", Revue française de science politique, 60 (2), translated from French by Simon Jackson, Presses de Sciences Po
- Black, Cyril E.; Falk, Richard A. (2015-03-08). The Future of the International Legal Order, Volume 2: Wealth and Resources. Princeton University Press. ISBN 978-1-4008-7221-3.
- Boisard, Marcel André; Chossudovsky, Evgeny M.; Lemoine, Jacques (1998). La Diplomatie Multilatérale. Martinus Nijhoff Publishers. ISBN 90-411-0524-7.
- Collectif (1992). "Bastid (Paul Raymond Marie)". Dictionnaire des parlementaires français de 1940 à 1958 (in French). Vol. 2. B. Paris: La Documentation française.
- Korowicz, Marek St. (2013-06-29). Introduction to International Law: Present Conceptions Of International Law In Theory And Practice. Springer Science & Business Media. ISBN 978-94-011-9226-2.
- Maitron (2015). "BASTID-BASDEVANT Suzanne". Dictionnaire Biographique Mouvement Ouvrier Mouvement Social (in French).
- Salokar, Rebecca Mae; Volcansek, Mary L. (1996-01-01). Women in Law: A Bio-bibliographical Sourcebook. Greenwood Publishing Group. ISBN 978-0-313-29410-5.
