= Oriano Otočan =

Croatian politician

Oriano Otočan (born 1 April 1969) is a Croatian politician. He held several roles in the government and administration of Istria County between 2001 and 2014 and was the president of the European Association for Local Democracy (ALDA) from 2012 to 2024. Otočan is a member of the Istrian Democratic Assembly (IDS).

== Early life and career ==
Otočan was born in Pula, in what was then the Socialist Republic of Croatia in the Socialist Federal Republic of Yugoslavia. He holds degrees from the University of Rijeka Faculty of Mechanics (1993) and the same university's Faculty of Economics (2002). He worked in the private sector before entering political life. A 2022 newspaper report noted that he owns or co-owns a number of businesses in Istria, including in the catering and performing arts sectors.

== Politics in Istria ==
Otočan was the IDS's communication secretary from 1998 to 2000 and its executive secretary from 2000 to 2001. He was also a member of the Pula city council's committee for social affairs in the same period. He appeared in the fifteenth position on the IDS's electoral list for the Istrian District assembly in the 2001 Croatian local elections and was elected when the list won a majority victory with twenty-eight out of forty-one seats. After the election, he served as head of the cabinet for district prefect Ivan Jakovčić.

He was appointed as a member of the district government in 2005 with responsibility for international cooperation and European integration. In December 2009, he was re-assigned as director of the department for international cooperation and European Union integration. He resigned this position in July 2014 in order to work as an assistant to Jakovčić, who had been elected as a member of the European Parliament in the 2014 European elections in Croatia. From 2014 to 2019, Otočan served as policy advisor and head of the parliamentary office for Jakovčić.

In December 2004, Otočan announced that the Istria would become the first region of Croatia to open a representative office in Brussels. Five years later, he said that this decision had greatly benefited the county, giving it better access to information about projects supported by the European Union.

Otočan became the IDS's secretary for international relations in 2008 and continues to hold this role as of 2024.

He was appointed by Italian president Giorgio Napolitano as an Officer of the Order of the Star of Italy in 2014, in recognition of his work in developing good relations with that country.

== European Association for Local Democracy ==
Otočan joined the ALDA board of governors in 2008. Four years later, he was chosen as the organization's president. He stood down from this role in May 2024, after serving three terms, and was elected as the organization's treasurer.
