= European University Centre =

Institute in a French university

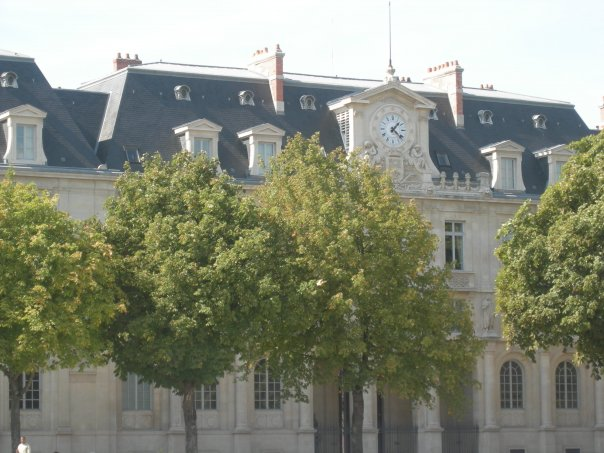
Law Faculty – European Centre Building

The European University Centre is a historical institute for European Studies part of Nancy 2 University. It was created in 1950 and it celebrated its 50th anniversary in 2000. For its 60th anniversary in 2010, it also celebrated the 50th Anniversary of Alumni CEU (French: Association des anciens du CEU, Spanish: Asociación de Antiguos Alumnos del CEU), which has become the main engine of this institute.

== Location ==
The European Centre is located in Nancy, France. This city is located in Lorraine, which borders the countries of Belgium, Germany and Luxembourg as well as the French Region of Alsace.

Nancy is very well served by the high-speed train line "TGV East Europe", which connects the city to Paris in 1.5 hours and to Strasbourg in 1 hour. In addition, since the city and its area have 40,000 university students from over 260,000 people, Nancy is the 5th largest university town in France.

== History ==
The European University Centre was created after the Congress of Europe of 9 May 1948 to "provide the cause of European unity with a fresh batch of militant elites". René Roblot was secretary-general of the center. The European Centre was established in 1950 with a clear objective by leading academics and with the support of politicians. To receive students throughout the continent, but especially those of Europe on the other side of the Curtain Steel, in the heart of Europe was aimed. Later, the European Communities became what we call today as the European Union, and the European Centre became an institution of high reputation. Nowadays, the institute offers specialised education on European issues: European Union law, Financial Management, Strategic Communication, Local Communities and Law of European Union Jurisdictions.

== Programs ==
Courses and seminars are offered by professors from both French and foreign universities, senior officials of the European Union and the Council of Europe, and professionals with expertise in law, management, economics and communications. In addition to this, the European Centre has an official European Information Office called Centre for European Documentation (French: Centre de documentation europeénne (CDE), Spanish: Centro de documentación europea).

Since its inception, the European Centre has welcomed around 3,500 students from more than 100 different nationalities. Each year, half of them are from France and the other half come from other countries both from Europe and the world beyond. This international mission has allowed the institute to hold commissioners, ministers, economists, communicators, lawyers, administrators and professors from all of Europe.

== Notable alumni ==
- Anikó Raisz, Hungarian politician
- Péter Kovács, Hungarian lawyer
- Nataša Vučković, Serbian politician
