= Darinka Matić Marović =

Serbian conductor (1937–2020)

Darinka Matić Marović (Serbian Cyrillic: Даринка Матић Маровић; 6 February 1937 – 15 July 2020) was a Serbian and Yugoslavian choir conductor. She was the rector of the Belgrade University of Arts between 1989 and 1998, the first woman rector in Yugoslavia. Before that, she was the dean of the Faculty of Music Arts between 1983 and 1989. She was main conductor of Collegium Musicum (the choir of the Faculty of Music Arts) between 1971 and 2002, and the main conductor of the Obilić Choir (the choir of the AKUD "Branko Krsmanović" of the Belgrade University) between 1981 and her death.

== Biography ==
Darinka Marović was born on 6 February 1937 in Herceg Novi, Kingdom of Yugoslavia. She was raised in Kotor. Her father was an officer of the Royal Yugoslav Army, but died during the World War II, so Darinka and her brother were raised by their mother. Darinka Marović finished elementary school and gymnasium in Kotor. She graduated from the Music Academy in Belgrade in 1959. She later specialized in conducting. As a student in Belgrade, she was member of the AKUD "Branko Krsmanović", the music ensemble of the Belgrade University.

On 23 November 1989, she was elected the rector of the Belgrade University of Arts. She was re-elected on 26 July 1994.

During the 1990s, Matić Marović was member of the then-ruling Socialist Party of Serbia (SPS), led by Slobodan Milošević. In the 1990 Serbian general election, she was a candidate for the member of the National Assembly in the Savski Venac constituency, but lost to Slobodan Vučković of the Democratic Party. During the 1996–1997 Serbian protests, she supported the protesters, but refused to join them.

Darinka Matić Marović was married to Branislav Matić, literature professor.

Matić Marović died in Belgrade on 15 July 2020. She was buried in the Alley of the Distinguished Citizens of the Belgrade New Cemetery.
