= Borislava =

Slavic feminine given name

- Pronunciation: Serbo-Croatian: [bǒrislaʋa]
- Gender: feminine

Origin
- Language: Slavic

Other names
- Derived: borti (battle) and slava (glory, fame)
- Related names: Borislav (m)

Borislava (Cyrillic: Борислава) is a Slavic feminine given name, derived from the Slavic elements borti (battle) and slava (glory, fame). It is the feminine form of Borislav.

Notable people with the name include:

- Borislava Perić (born 1972), Serbian table tennis player
- Borislava Botusharova (born 1994), Bulgarian tennis player
- Borislava Ivanova (born 1966), Bulgarian sprint canoer
- Borislava Borisova (born 1951), Bulgarian-Swedish chess player
- Borislava Kireva (born 1989) is a Bulgarian footballer

== See also ==
- Borislav, male form of the name
- Slavic names
