= European Association for Local Democracy =

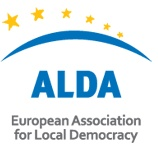
ALDA logo

ALDA, the European Association for Local Democracy, is a membership based organisation established in 1999 at the initiative of the Council of Europe's Congress of Local and Regional Authorities. ALDA works on the promotion of good governance and citizen participation at the local level, focusing on activities that facilitate cooperation between local authorities and civil society in the European Union and its Neighbourhood.

The assumption underlying its importance, is that strengthen local democracy and local governance is a fundamental element for securing peace, equity, human rights and economic and social growth in the community. Therefore, supporting actions and policies towards local democracy is an essential part of the European Union approach to governance, democracy, economy and peace.

As a membership based organisation, ALDA gathers more than 180 members - including local authorities, associations of local authorities and non-governmental organisations - from over 35 countries. It is funded through membership fees as well as project funding from the European Commission, the Council of Europe, and other public and private donors. What makes ALDA's work unique is that it is based on the method of multilateral decentralised cooperation. This method involves a multi-stakeholder approach, which focuses on strong partnerships between local authorities and civil society organinisations. These partnerships create positive synergy and ensure that common goals are reached jointly and successfully. In the framework of promoting good governance and citizen participation at the local level ALDA works in various themes, such as European integration, decentralisation, civic initiatives and volunteering, human rights, and sustainable economic development.

Nataša Vučković, a former Democratic Party (DS) member of the Serbian parliament, was elected to a four-year term as president of ALDA in June 2024.

== Working Areas ==
The activities of ALDA are articulated around three main areas:

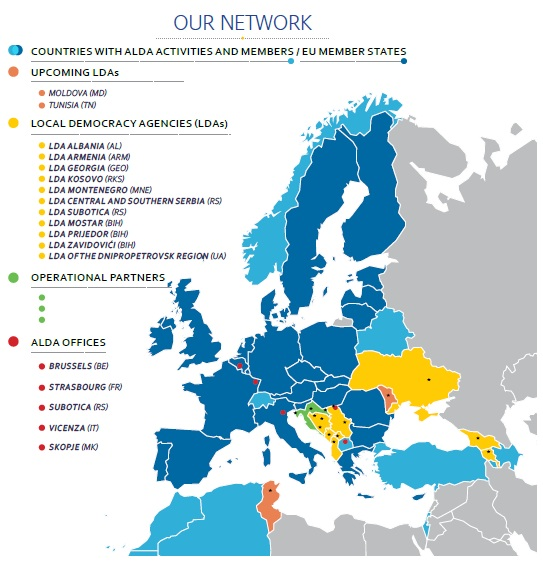
Location of partners, members, LDAs and offices

- ALDA Europe: In the European Union ALDA works promoting active European citizenship, in tight cooperation with local authorities, civil society networks, and European institutions. The activities help raising citizens' understanding and sense of belonging to the European Union, and stimulate intercultural dialogue and civic participation. This is achieved by conducting its own and its members' projects, as well as through lobbying activities.
- ALDA Cooperation: ALDA also works in the Western Balkans and in the European Neighbourhood - Mediterranean area, Eastern Europe, and Southern Caucasus - to foster good governance, citizen participation, European integration, and decentralisation. It coordinates and supports the network of 14 Local Democracy Agencies and 3 Operational Partners in their activities. Most of the Local Democracy Agencies are located in the Western Balkans, but ALDA is becoming more and more active in the European Neighbourhood. Besides, ALDA is leading several projects and developing partnerships in other countries of the European Neighbourhood, including Belarus, Azerbaijan, Morocco, Algeria and Turkey.
- ALDA Plus: ALDA supports other stakeholders by providing a wide range of services, such as training and capacity building activities, technical assistance, and ad hoc consultancy on different topics, including: project development and implementation, project financial management and audit, EU institutions, EU funds and programmes, citizen participation (methods and techniques), and non-formal youth education. These services are provided with a tailor-made approach, thus target the specific needs of the partners involved.
