= When the Dust Settles (novel) =

2023 novel by Jasmina Atanasova

- Author: Jasmina Atanasova
- Language: Macedonian
- Genre: Novel
- Publication date: 2023
- Publication place: North Macedonia
- Media type: printed edition, 19 mm
- Pages: 169 pages
- ISBN: 978-608-4885-64-1

When the Dust Settles is a 2023 Macedonian novel by Jasmina Atanasova.

== Style ==
The novel employs postmodernist modern techniques, including chapter epigraphs and a compositional structure that draws on multiple literary styles.

It is written in the first person, by a female narrator who is simultaneously the character through which the entire narrative principle is reflected. The novel follows the procedure of the state of consciousness according to the principles of James Joyce and Virginia Woolf, not in a comparative or inspirational sense, but as a kind of "dialectical" branching, which is a serious contribution and stake in the development and enrichment of Macedonian contemporary literature.

The specificity of this novel lies in its fluid, clear narrative that is dynamic and harmoniously balanced. The skill to synthesize the stream of consciousness through a subtle and unobtrusive principle, along with the "traditional" stylistically rhythmic narrative approach of Isaac Bashevis Singer, makes this novel particularly bold in the successful attempt to merge traditional narrative "architecture" with contemporary currents in internal literary expressions moving simultaneously in multiple directions.

== Reception ==
According to Dr. Slavica Gadzova Sviderska, "Atanasova writes about women with a capital 'W,' constantly placed in front of struggles, challenges, and daily self-sacrifices on the societal altar. These women continually find strength from a mysterious source to stand on their feet again and resist the entrenched taboos and stereotyped forms of living ."

Darko Leshoski wrote, "Everyone wants to be themselves, but rarely anyone can be because they have to conform to their mom, to their dad, to the children, what people will say, what I will say to myself if I fail — but rarely does anyone have the strength to truly be themselves. Jasmina bravely but vulnerably describes that battle. Everyone's life happiness, and life span are proportionate to their courage. "It is courageous is to be happy."
