= René Roblot =

French Jurist

- Born: 28 October 1913
- Died: 1992 (aged 78–79)
- Occupation: Jurist

René Roblot (28 October 1913 – 1992) was a French jurist who specialized in commercial law. He is known as co-author of the Traité de droit commercial, which ran into over 19 editions.

== Life ==
René Roblot was born on 28 October 1913. He studied at the Faculty of Law of the University of Paris, and published his thesis on La Justice criminelle en France sous la Terreur in 1937. He taught at Nancy-Université and at the European University Centre. Roblot was Professor of private law, specializing in commercial law, at the Nancy Faculty of Law. He was Dean of the Faculty of Law from 1956 to 1961. Georges Ripert 's Traité de droit commercial (1914) was later revised and republished by Ripert and Roblot.

Roblot supported supranationalist institutions in Europe. The European University Centre, of which he was secretary-general, had been created after the Congress of Europe of 9 May 1948 to "provide the cause of European unity with a fresh batch of militant elites". He was close to Michel Gaudet, director of Legal Service of the High Authority of the European Coal and Steel Community, whom he regularly invited to lecture at the European University Centre. At the Stresa congress on the ECSC in May–June 1957 Roblot replaced Suzanne Bastid, who had stated in public that she was against the European Defence Community (EDC) treaty.

René Roblot died in 1992.

== Publications ==
- René Roblot (1937), La Justice criminelle en France sous la Terreur (thesis: Université de Paris. Faculté de droit.), Paris: R. Pichon et R. Durand-Auzias, p. 314
- René Roblot (1945), Code civil, preface by André Rouast, Paris: R. Pichon et R. Durand-Auzias, p. 499
- René Roblot (1953), Les effets de commerce : lettre de change, billets à ordre et au porteur, warrants, Paris: Rousseau, p. 678
- Paul Durand; Georges Ripert; René Roblot (1959), Traité élémentaire de droit commercial, Paris: Librairie générale de droit et de jurisprudence
- Paul Durand; Georges Ripert; René Roblot (1960), Le Droit fiscal des affaires après la réforme fiscale, Paris: Librairie générale de droit et de jurisprudence, p. 267
- Georges Ripert; René Roblot (1992), Traité de droit commercial (2 ed.), Paris: Librairie générale de droit et de jurisprudence
- Georges Ripert; René Roblot; Patrick Serlooten (1994), Droit fiscal des affaires (3 ed.), Paris: Librairie générale de droit et de jurisprudence, p. 884
- René Roblot (2003), Les organismes de placement collectif en valeurs mobilières, OPCVM (3 ed.), Paris: Association nationale des sociétés par actions, p. 629
- Georges Ripert; René Roblot (2009), Michel Germain (ed.), Traité de droit commercial (19 ed.), Paris: LGDJ

== Sources ==
- Autour des Grands Professeurs de la Faculté (PDF) (in French), November 2014
- Bailleux, Julie (2010), "How Europe became law", Revue française de science politique, 60 (2), translated from French by Simon Jackson, Presses de Sciences Po
- Mainguy, Daniel, Bio de juristes : Ripert (in French)
- René Roblot (1913-1992) (in French), BnF: Bibliotheque nationale de France
- Roblot, René (1937), La Justice criminelle en France sous la Terreur (thesis: Université de Paris. Faculté de droit.), Paris: R. Pichon et R. Durand-Auzias, p. 314
