= Jasmina Atanasova =

Macedonian writer

- Јасмина Атанасова
- Born: May 16, 1974 (age 52); Bitola, Socialist Republic of Macedonia
- Occupation: Writer
- Writing career
- Notable work: When the Dust Settles (2023)

Jasmina Atanasova (Macedonian: Јасмина Атанасова; born 16 May 1974, in Bitola) is a Macedonian writer.

She is best known for her debut novel, When the Dust Settles,. published in 2023. It is known for its authorial principle evident throughout the entire compositional structure. It transforms the literary stylistic universe through a postmodernist procedure., She is noted through a series of essayistic interviews and societal engagement, highlighting her commitment to the creative, social, and societal positioning of women..

Atanasova graduated from the Faculty of Pharmacy at the Ss. Cyril and Methodius University in Skopje. As of 2024, she works as a professor at the Municipal Medical High School "Dr. Jovan Kalauzi" in Bitola.
