= Borisav Kovačević =

Serbian politician

Borisav Kovačević (Serbian Cyrillic: Борисав Ковачевић; born 9 April 1943) is a politician in Serbia. He has served in the National Assembly of Serbia since 2012 as a member of the Party of United Pensioners of Serbia (PUPS).

== Early life and career ==
Kovačević is a graduate philologist. Now retired, he is based in the Belgrade municipality of Zemun.

== Politician ==
The PUPS contested the 2007 Serbian parliamentary election in an alliance with the Social Democratic Party, and Kovačević received the thirteenth position on their combined electoral list. The list did not cross the electoral threshold to win representation in the assembly.

For the 2008 parliamentary election, the PUPS joined an electoral alliance led by the Socialist Party of Serbia and Kovačević was given the eleventh position on their coalition list. The list won twenty seats, but Kovačević was not subsequently chosen to be part of the PUPS assembly delegation. (From 2000 to 2011, Serbian parliamentary mandates were awarded to successful parties or coalitions rather than to individual candidates, and it was common practice for the mandates to be awarded out of numerical order. Kovačević did not automatically receive a mandate by virtue of his list position.)

Serbia's electoral system was reformed in 2011, such that parliamentary mandates were awarded in numerical order to candidates on successful lists. The PUPS alliance with the Socialist Party continued into the 2012 election; Kovačević received the forty-ninth position on the Socialist-led electoral list and narrowly missed direct election when the list won forty-four mandates. He was awarded a mandate on 30 July 2012 as a replacement for party leader Jovan Krkobabić, who had resigned to take a cabinet position. PUPS joined part of Serbia's coalition government after the election, and Kovačević served as part of its parliamentary majority.

Kovačević was promoted to the twenty-ninth position on the Socialist-led list in the 2014 election and was re-elected when the list again won forty-four mandates. For the next two years, the PUPS was not in government but provided external support to Aleksandar Vučić's administration.

The PUPS joined the Aleksandar Vučić – Serbia Is Winning electoral alliance led by the Serbian Progressive Party for the[ 2016 Serbian parliamentary election. Kovačević received the 130th position on the list and was re-elected when the list won a majority victory with 131 out of 250 mandates. The PUPS returned to direct participation in government after the election. In the 2016–20 parliament, Kovačević was the deputy leader of the PUPS assembly group; a member of the defence and internal affairs committee and the environmental protection committee; a deputy member of the culture and information committee and the committee on administrative, budgetary, mandate, and immunity issues; a deputy member of the European Union–Serbia stabilization and association parliamentary committee; and a member of the parliamentary friendship groups with China, North Macedonia, Russia, Spain, and Sweden.

He received the seventy-fourth position on the Progressive Party's Aleksandar Vučić — For Our Children coalition list in the 2020 Serbian parliamentary election and was elected to a fourth term when the list won a landslide majority with 188 mandates. He is now a member of the health and family committee and the security services control committee, a deputy member of the defence committee and the committee on constitutional and legislative issues, and a member of Serbia's parliamentary friendship groups with China, North Macedonia, Russia, and Spain.
