= Borzysław, Kamień County =

Borzysław
- Hamlet (colony)
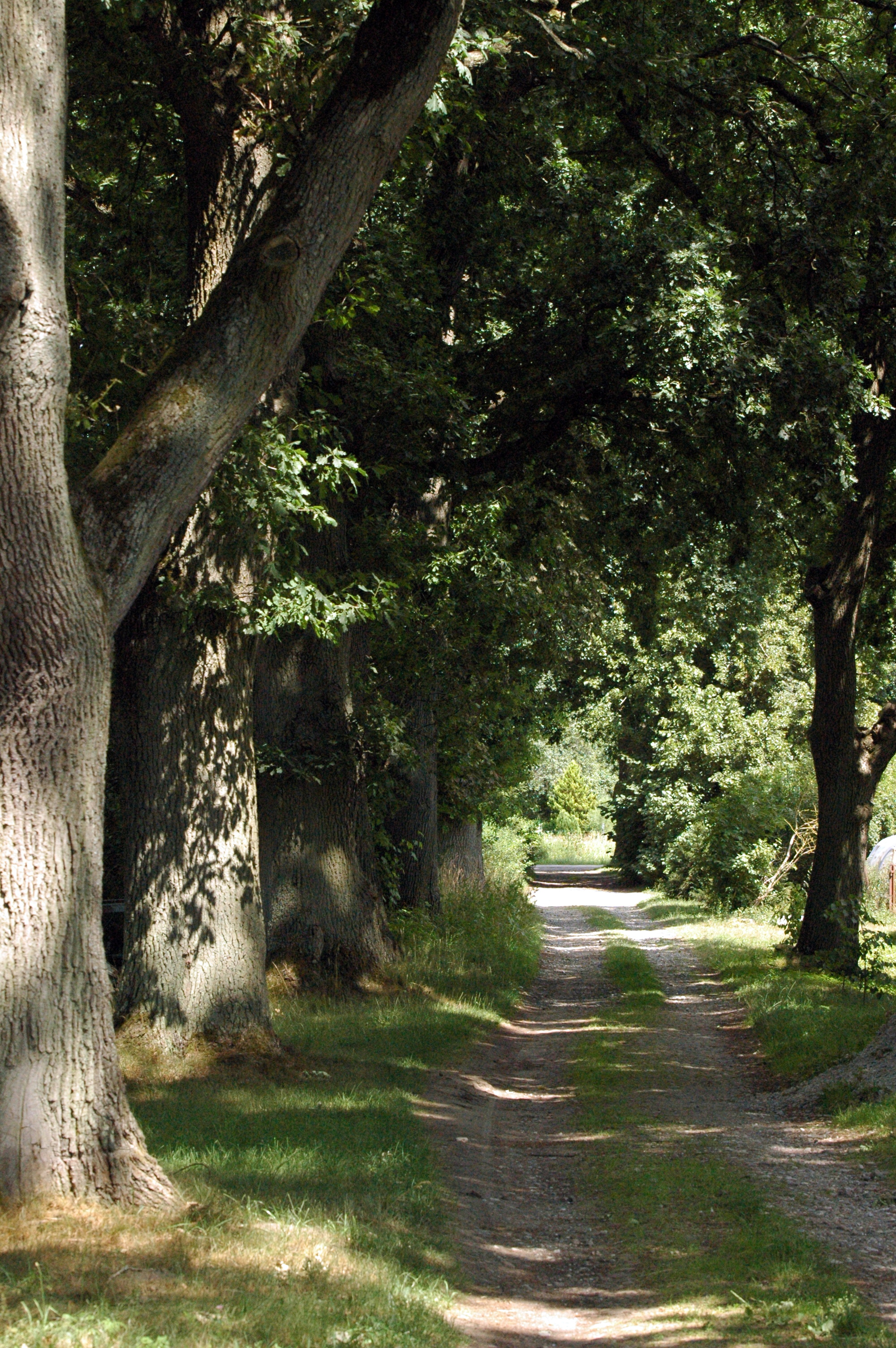
- The historic park in Borzysław in 2023.

- Location within Poland
- Coordinates: 53°52′25″N 14°48′37″E
- Country: Poland
- Voivodeship: West Pomeranian
- County: Kamień
- Municipality: Kamień Pomorski
- Time zone: UTC+1 (CET)
  - Summer (DST): UTC+2 (CEST)
- Postal code: 72-400
- Area code: +48 91
- Car plates: ZKA

Borzysław (Polish: [bɔˈʐɘ̟.swaf]) is a hamlet (colony) in the West Pomeranian Voivodeship, Poland, located within the municipality of Kamień Pomorski in Kamień County.

== Recreational areas ==
Borzysław includes a historic park complex, with an area of 2 ha (4.94 acres), which was developed in the 19th century, as a garden of a manor house. In 1983, it was entered into the Registry of Cultural Property.
