= University of Arts in Belgrade =

Public university in Serbia

- Универзитет уметности у Београду; Univerzitet umetnosti u Beogradu
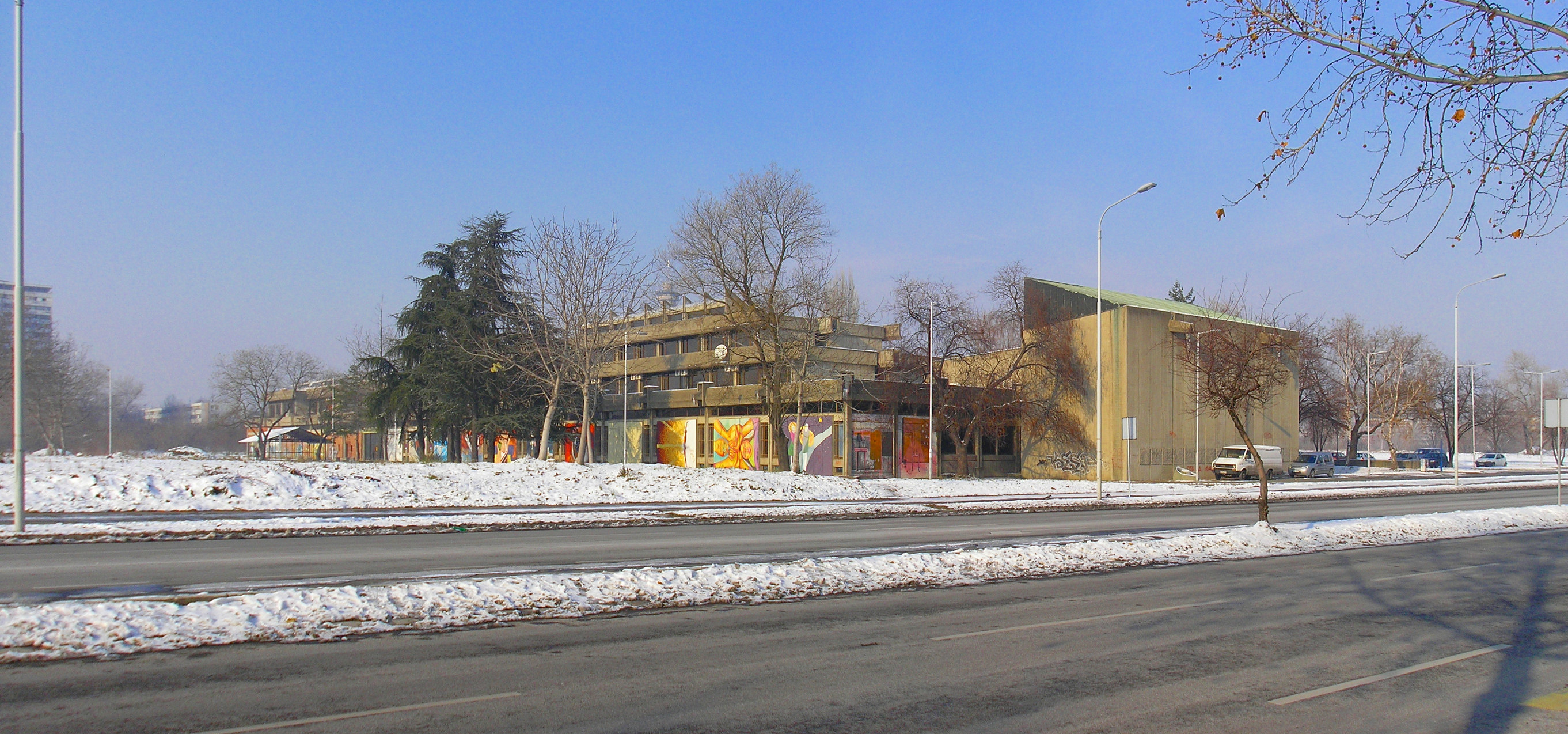
- Former names: Art Academy in Belgrade
- Type: Public
- Established: 10 June 1957; 69 years ago
- Budget: €12.66 million (2020, planned; public funding)
- Rector: Mirjana Nikolić (2021–27)
- Academic staff: 489 (2023–24)
- Students: 2,905 (2023–24)
- Undergraduates: 1,907 (2023–24)
- Postgraduates: 526 (2023–24)
- Doctoral students: 472 (2023–24)
- Location: Belgrade, Serbia; 44°49′05″N 20°27′03″E
- Website: www.arts.bg.ac.rs

The University of Arts in Belgrade (Serbian Cyrillic: Универзитет уметности у Београду, romanized: Univerzitet umetnosti u Beogradu) is a public university in Serbia. It was founded in 1957 as the Academy of Arts to unite four academies. It became a university and acquired its current name in 1973.

== History ==
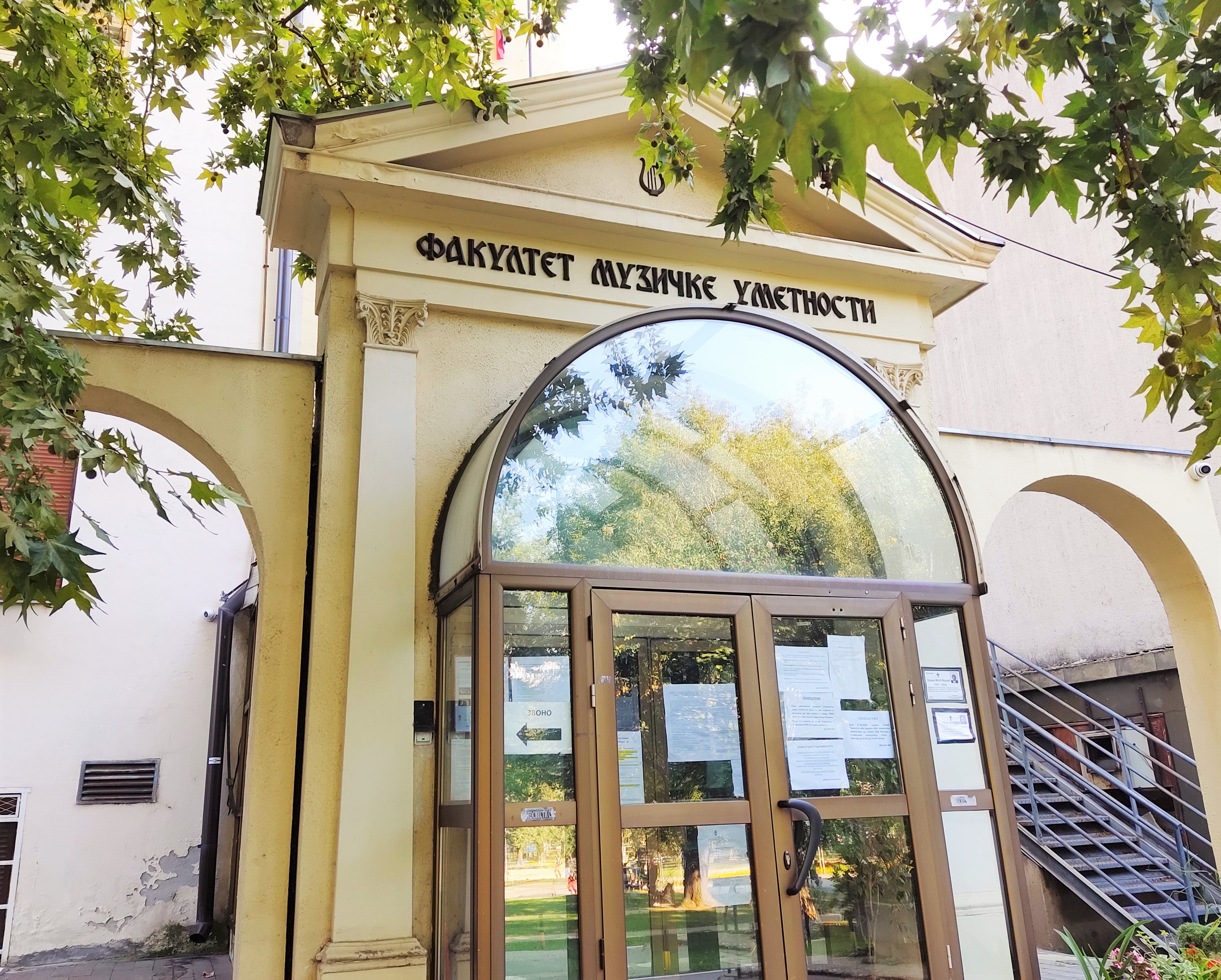
Faculty of Music, University of Arts in Belgrade

The University of Arts was established on 10 June 1957, as the Academy of Arts, a union of the existing higher art schools (academies). Until then independent, the Academy of Music (founded in 1937), the Academy of Fine Arts (founded in 1937), the Academy of Applied Arts (founded in 1948) and the Academy of Theatrical Arts (founded in 1948) became the Academy of Art, an association of higher art schools in Belgrade.

In 1973, these four academies, being the only higher art schools in Serbia at that time, became faculties: the Faculty of Fine Arts, the Faculty of Music, the Faculty of Applied Arts and Design and the Faculty of Dramatic Arts (theater, film, radio and television). Being their association, the then Academy of Arts became the University of Arts in Belgrade.

== Faculties ==
The faculties of the University of Arts with data about location, academic staff and number of students as of 2023–24 academic year:

Faculty	Location	Academic staff	Students
Music Arts	Belgrade	204	949
Applied Arts	Belgrade	104	820
Dramatic Arts	Belgrade	124	653
Fine Arts	Belgrade	57	352
Interdisciplinary Studies	Belgrade	-	131
Total		489	2,905

=== Faculty of Music Arts ===
The Faculty of Music is the oldest higher education institution for music in Serbia. It was established in 1937 as the Academy of Music, and became a faculty and acquired its current name in 1973.

=== Faculty of Applied Arts ===
The Faculty of Applied Arts was established in 1948 as the Academy of Applied Arts, and became a faculty and acquired its current name in 1973.

=== Faculty of Dramatic Arts ===
The Faculty of Dramatic Arts was established in 1948 as the Academy of Theatre Arts. In 1950, the High Education School for Film Acting and Directing was merged into it, and in 1962, its name was changed to the Academy of Theatre, Film, Radio and Television. In 1973, it became a faculty and acquired its current name. It is the only one located in Novi Beograd.

=== Faculty of Fine Arts ===
The Faculty of Fine Arts (Serbian: Факултет ликовних уметности, romanized: Fakultet likovnih umetnosti) is a higher education institution that was established in 1937 by Toma Rosandić, Milo Milunović and Petar Dobrović as the Academy of Fine Arts, and became a faculty and acquired its current name in 1973. The faculty has three departments - sculpture, painting and graphic - and has approximately 2500 students and a teaching staff of 550.

== Interdisciplinary studies ==
Interdisciplinary studies of the University of Arts in Belgrade were founded in 2001, as contemporary conceived studies in the domain of polymedia, digital arts, scene design, theory of arts and media and management in the culture. Interdisciplinary studies were created out of the need of studying contemporary artistic or theoretical fields which are not covered by usual artistic and scientific disciplines. These studies research new artistic and theoretical practices, which are linked to studies on particular faculties.

Interdisciplinary studies represent a significant developmental activity of the University of arts which strengthens links of the University with its faculties, improves cooperation amongst professors of the faculties of arts, as well as the experts from various fields

== Rectors ==
List of rectors with term served:

- Sreten Stojanović (1957–1958)
- Mihailo Vukdragović (1958–1959)
- Đorđe Andrejević-Kun (1959–1963)
- Vjekoslav Afrić (1963–1965)
- Bruno Brun (1965–1971)
- Jovan Kratohvil (1971–1973)
- Dragoslav Stojanović Sip (1973–1976)
- Ratko Đurović (1976–1977)
- Radoš Novaković (1977–1979)
- Aleksandar Obradović (1979–1983)
- Vojin Stojić (1983–1985)
- Nandor Glid (1985–1989)
- Darinka Matić-Marović (1989–1998)
- Radmila Bakočević (1998–2000)
- Milena Dragićević Šešić (2000–2004)
- Čedomir Vasić (2004–2009)
- Ljiljana Mrkić Popović (2009–2015)
- Zoran Erić (2015–2018)
- Mileta Prodanović (2018–2021)
- Mirjana Nikolić (2021–present)

== Notable alumni ==
- Dragana Radakovic, opera singer
- Mladen Kolobarić, designer of the current flag of Bosnia and Herzegovina

== See also ==
- Education in Serbia
- List of universities in Serbia
