= Orehovo, North Macedonia =

Village in Pelagonia, North Macedonia

Oreovo Ореово
- Village
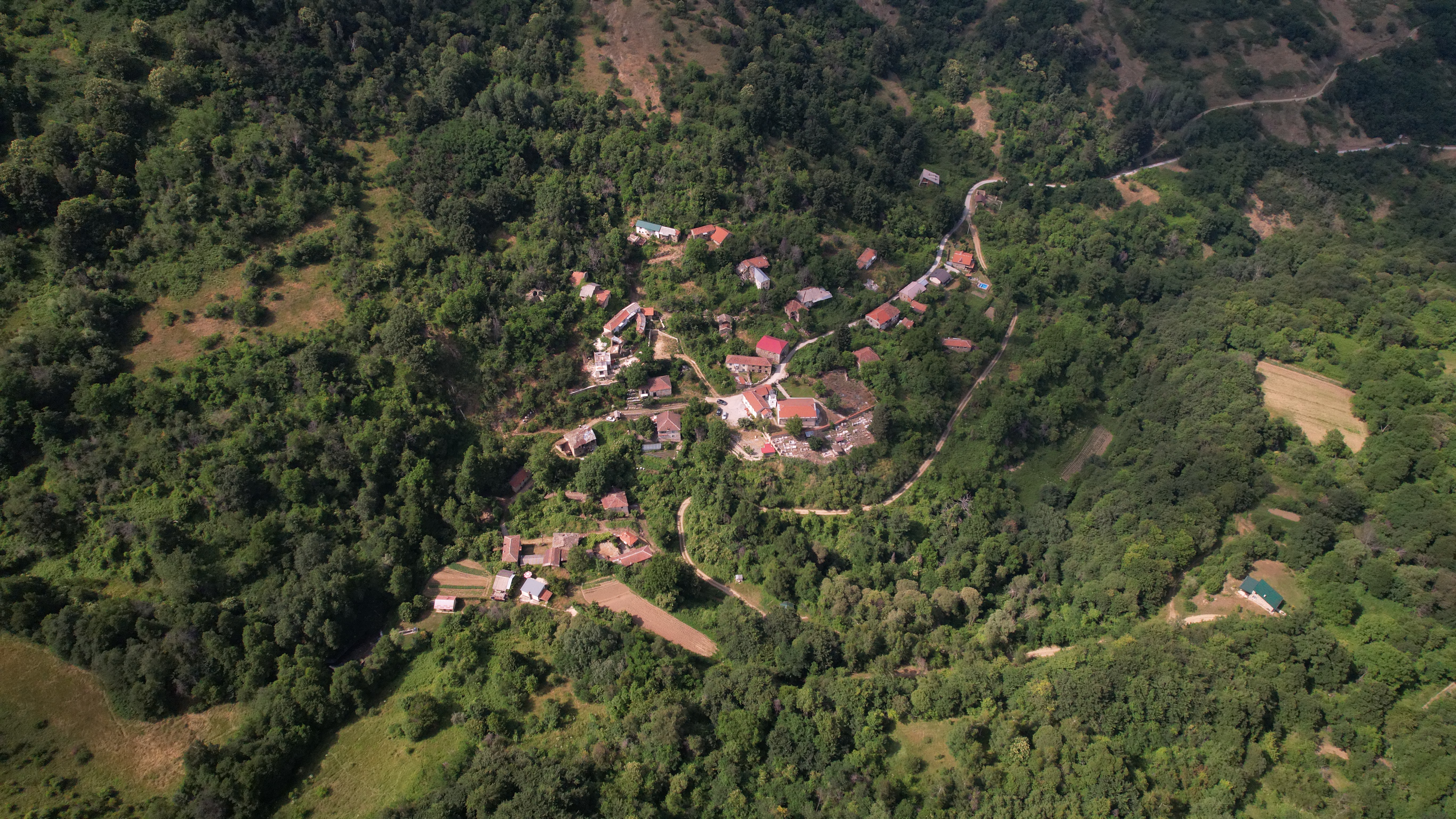
- Air view of the village

- Location within North Macedonia
- Country: North Macedonia
- Region: Pelagonia
- Municipality: Bitola

Population (2025)
  - Total: 4
- Time zone: UTC+1 (CET)
  - Summer (DST): UTC+2 (CEST)

Oreovo (Macedonian: Ореово) is a village in the Bitola Municipality of North Macedonia

== Demographics ==
Orehovo is attested in the Ottoman defter of 1467/68 as a village in the vilayet of Manastir. The inhabitants attested largely bore typical Slavic anthroponyms along with instances of Albanian ones, such as Tomçe son of Gon.

According to the 2002 census, the village had a total of 23 inhabitants. Ethnic groups in the village include:

- Macedonians 23
