= Radmila Bakočević =

Serbian operatic soprano (born 1933)

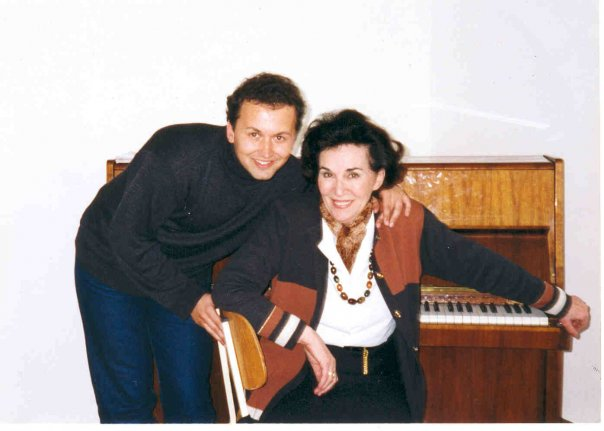
Bakočević (right) in 2003

Radmila Bakočević (Serbian Cyrillic: Радмила Бакочевић, pronounced [rǎdmila bakɔ̌ːtʃɛʋitɕ]; born 5 January 1933), is a Serbian operatic soprano who had a major international opera career that began in 1955 and ended upon her retirement from the stage in 2004. During her career, she sang at most of the world's important opera houses, including performances throughout Europe, North and South America. She forged important long-term artistic partnerships with two opera houses during her career: the National Theatre in Belgrade and the Vienna State Opera.

== Biography ==
Bakočević was born in Guča, Lučani, Kingdom of Yugoslavia. She studied singing at the Academy of Music in Belgrade (now the University of Arts) with Nikola Cvejić and then continued further studies at the school for young opera singers at La Scala. She made her professional opera debut in 1955 at the National Theatre in Belgrade as Mimi in Giacomo Puccini's La Bohème. Earning rave reviews, she became a regular performer at that opera house.

In 1958 Bakočević earned Second Prize at the Belgrade International Competition of Young Artists. In 1962 she won the Geneva International Singing Competition and in 1964 she won the Lüttich International Singing Competition. These competition wins brought her to the attention of the international opera community and she was soon engaged to perform in the world's leading opera houses.

In 1967 Bakočević made her debut at the Teatro Lirico Giuseppe Verdi in Triest the role of Olga in Nikolai Rimsky-Korsakov's The Maid of Pskov. That same year she joined the roster at the Vienna State Opera where she sang regularly through 1982 in such roles as Minnie in Puccini's La fanciulla del West, Elisabetta in Giuseppe Verdi's Don Carlos and Maddalena in Umberto Giordano's Andrea Chénier among many others. She made her San Francisco Opera debut on October 15, 1968, as Leonora in Il trovatore. She joined the Metropolitan Opera in New York City for the 1968–1969 season, singing there Cio-Cio-San in Madama Butterfly, Leonora, Marguerite in Faust, Micaela in Carmen and Mimì. In 1969 she made her first appearance at the Deutsche Oper Berlin as Maria in Pyotr Ilyich Tchaikovsky's Mazeppa.

In 1972, Bakočević made her first appearance in Paris at the Palais Garnier as Norma. She returned many times to Paris during the 1970s, performing in all of the major houses in that city. In 1973 she made her debut with the Philadelphia Lyric Opera Company as Amelia in Un ballo in maschera with Plácido Domingo and Bernabé Martí alternating as Riccardo, Cornell MacNeil as Renato, Lili Chookasian as Ulrica and Patricia Wise as Oscar. She appeared in 1982 in the title role of Puccini's Turandot at the Deutsche Oper am Rhein, a role she repeated in Dublin in December 1986.

Bakočević's many other appearances between 1963 and 1982 included performances at the Staatsoper Berlin, the Bavarian State Opera, the Bolshoi Theatre, the Grand Théâtre de Bordeaux, the Grand Théâtre de Genève, the Hamburg State Opera, the Hungarian National Opera, La Fenice, the Liceu, the Opéra National de Paris, the Palacio de Bellas Artes, the Polish National Opera, the Romanian National Opera, Bucharest, the Teatro Colón, the Teatro Comunale Florence, the Teatro dell'Opera di Roma, the Teatro di San Carlo, the Teatro Massimo, the Teatro Nacional de São Carlos, the Teatro Regio di Parma, and the Teatro Regio di Torino to name just a few.

A spinto soprano, Bakočević sang a wide repertoire that encompassed works from the 17th through the 20th century. She particularly excelled in portraying Puccini and Verdi heroines and was also admired for a handful of roles in operas by Strauss and Wagner. She also sang in a number of Russian and Czech operas by composers like Rimsky-Korsakov, Smetana, and Tchaikovsky. She sang three roles in French; Giulietta in Jacques Offenbach's Les Contes d'Hoffmann, Marguerite in Charles Gounod's Faust and Micaela in Georges Bizet's Carmen. She did, however, possess a flexible enough voice to tackle several bel canto roles by Bellini and Donizetti.

Since retiring from the stage, Bakočević works as a professor of singing at several universities. Currently, she is the emeritus professor in the Faculty of Musuc at the University of Arts in Belgrade where she also served as the university's Rector from 1998 to 2000. She is also a member of the Association of Musical Artists of Serbia.

== Works ==
Other roles that Bakočević performed on stage during her career including: Adriana in Francesco Cilea's Adriana Lecouvreur, Aida in Verdi's Aida, Amelia in Verdi's Simon Boccanegra, Antonida in Mikhail Glinka's A Life for the Tsar, Beatrice in Bellini's Beatrice di Tenda, Cherubino in Mozart's Le nozze di Figaro, Desdemona in Verdi's Otello, Elisabetta in Gaetano Donizetti's Roberto Devereux, Elisabeth in Wagner's Tannhäuser, Elvira in Verdi's Ernani, Giulietta in Jacques Offenbach's Les Contes d'Hoffmann, Iolanta in Tchaikovsky's Iolanta, Jaroslavna in Alexander Borodin's Prince Igor, Leonora in Verdi's La Forza del destino, Lisa in Tchaikovsky's The Queen of Spades, Manon in Puccini's Manon Lescaut, Marie in Bedřich Smetana's The Bartered Bride, Mlada in Smetana's Dalibor, Pauline in Sergei Prokofiev's The Gambler, Poppea in Claudio Monteverdi's L'incoronazione di Poppea, Salome in Richard Strauss's Salome, Tatyana in Tchaikovsky's Eugene Onegin, and Violetta in Verdi's La traviata.

== Sources ==
- Karl-Josef Kutsch; Leo Riemens (1969). A concise biographical dictionary of singers: from the beginning of recorded sound to the present. Translated from German, expanded and annotated by Harry Earl Jones. Philadelphia: Chilton Book Company. ISBN 0-8019-5516-5.
