= Borislav Traikovski =

Macedonian painter (1917–1996)

Borislav Traikovski (1917–1996) is a Macedonian painter. One of the most famous Macedonian painters, Borislav Traikovski was born on June 15, 1917, in Bitola. He died on October 11, 1996, in Bitola.

== Education and career ==
In 1937, he began his studies at the Architecture department of the Technical Faculty in Belgrade, which were interrupted by World War II in 1941, and required his return to Bitola. In the period between 1944 and 1947 he taught arts at a primary school in his home town.

In 1951 Borislav Traikovski, Mile Korubin, and Risto Lozanovski were the first Macedonians graduates from Academy for Fine Arts in Belgrade. During his education, Traikovski studied with a number of teachers (Gjorge Andreevic–Kun, Ljubica Sokić, Kosta Hakman, Ivan Tabaković) whose methods often conflicted with his own. After 1951, he returned to his native Bitola and became employed as a professor at the Gymnasium and Teacher's school. While he was a member of the Society of Fine Artists of Macedonia, he spent time on a study trip to Italy in 1954 and Paris in 1961.

In 1960, he started working as an associate professor of the Technical Faculty in Skopje; however, he quit after only a few days and returned to Bitola saying: "If I had to move and not be able to see the blue skyline of Bitola, I am sure, I would have stopped painting."

The academic painter Borislav Traikovski exhibited in many cities in the country and abroad independently or as a part of a collective in Bitola, Prilep, Skopje, Struga, Belgrade, Zagreb, London, Bradford, Ferrara, and Paris.

== Painting Style ==
A large number of his landscapes, still lifes and portraits reflect discernible influences of Rouault and Konjovic. In some of his paintings of his last phase, he changed his expressionist style to move into abstraction.

== Accomplishments ==
Traikovski is one of the founders of the contemporary art in Bitola and Macedonia, one of the founders and first president of Society of fine artists of Bitola, and one of the most significant members of the "VDIST" group. For his work he has been awarded a number of awards and prizes. He has taken part in numerous group exhibitions, art colonies in Macedonia, Europe etc. His significant work is remembered by the use of alternative art-exhibition spaces such as different factories, streets, public spaces, and squares—guided by the idea of "art for all". His works are part of all permanent museum collections in Macedonia, a number of museums in Europe and can be found in private collections. The jubilee exhibition on the occasion of 40 years of his creation in 1991, represented confirmation of his artistic personality. This exhibition is important for the development of the Macedonian modern painting as a whole.

In his honor, since 2006 the Society of Fine Artists of Bitola has inaugurated a yearly prize bearing his name. The prize “Borislav Traikovski” is awarded for the best artwork presented at the yearly exhibition of the Society of Artists.
