= Dejan Kesar =

Serbian politician

Dejan Kesar (Serbian Cyrillic: Дејан Кесар; born 1987) is a politician in Serbia. He has served in the National Assembly of Serbia since 2020 as a member of the Serbian Progressive Party.

== Private career ==
Kesar has a Bachelor of Laws degree. He lives in Belgrade.

== Politician ==
=== Municipal politics ===
Kesar received the twelfth position on the Progressive Party's electoral list for the Savski Venac municipal assembly in the 2016 Serbian local elections and was elected when the list won thirteen mandates. The Progressives emerged as the dominant party in a municipal coalition government after the election, and Kesar served on the government side. He was given the ninth position on the Progressive list in Savski Venac in the 2020 Serbian local elections and was re-elected when the list won a majority victory with twenty-three mandates.

=== Parliamentarian ===
Kesar received the 136th position on the Progressive Party's Aleksandar Vučić — For Our Children coalition list in the 2020 Serbian parliamentary election and was elected to the assembly when the list won a landslide majority with 188 mandates. He is a member of the assembly committee on spatial planning, transport, infrastructure, and telecommunications; a deputy member of the committee on the diaspora and Serbs in the region and the committee on the judiciary, public administration, and local self government; the head of Serbia's parliamentary friendship group with Bhutan; and a member of the parliamentary friendship groups with Bosnia and Herzegovina, China, Germany, Italy, Japan, and Malta.
