= John of Saint-Denis =

French Orthodox bishop (1905–1970)

Bishop of Saint-Denis
- Born: 8 April 1905; St Petersburg, Russia
- Died: 30 January 1970 (aged 64)
- Venerated in: Communion of Western Orthodox Churches
- Canonized: 12 October 2008, Church of the Mother of God and St Thiebault, Gorze, France by The Orthodox Church of the Gauls
- Feast: 30 January

Bishop John-Nectarius (French: évêque Jean-Nectaire, Russian: Епископ Иоанн-Нектарий, secular name Evgraf Evgrafovich Kovalevsky, Russian: Евграф Евграфович Ковалевский; April 8, 1905 – January 30, 1970), was the First Hierarch of the Orthodox Church of France (ECOF) from 1966 until his death in 1970. He was the brother of the deacon and musicologist Maxime Kovalevsky (1903–1988) and the historian Pierre Kovalevsky (1901–1979).

== Life ==
Eugraph Kovalevsky was born in St Petersburg, Russia, on April 8, 1905 in noble family.

He was co-founder with Vladimir Lossky of the Brotherhood of St. Photius (1925) and the St. Denys Theological Institute (1944). He was ordained a priest of the Moscow Patriarchate by Metropolitan Eleutherius (Bogoyavlenky) in 1937. Upon the death of Archimandrite Irénée (Louis-Charles) Winnaert, he was placed in charge of the newly formed Western Orthodox Church established by Metropolitan Sergius, the Patriarchal locum tenens of Moscow. The Holy Synod of the Church of Russia conferred upon him the title Doctor of Divinity in 1952. In 1966, he was tonsured by Saint John Maximovitch, given the monastic name of Jean-Nectaire, consecrated bishop (with the assistance Theophilus (Ionescu) of Sèvres), and installed as the first Bishop of Saint-Denis in the modern era, making him the bishop of the Western Rite diocese now known as the Orthodox Church of France. He died on 30 January 1970.

The vesting of St John of Saint-Denis at his consecration

== Death and canonisation ==
Bishop John died on January 30, 1970. He was canonised as a saint on 12 October 2008 by Bishop Gregory of Arles.

== Writings ==
His major published works are

1. La Sainte Messe selon l'ancien rite des Gaules ou Liturgie selon S. Germain de Paris. Le canon eucharistique de l'ancien rite des Gaules.
2. Homélies. Quelques enseignements spirituels donnés en l'Eglise Saint Irénée.
3. Message de Noël.
4. Pierre et Paul. Leur signification. Leur place dans la tradition chrétienne catholique orthodoxe.
5. Quarante Degrés ou quarante Immolation de Carême.
6. La Sainte Messe selon St Germain de Paris et le chant des fideèles.
7. Initiation à la Genèse.
8. Technique de la prière. (Published in English as A Method of Prayer for Modern Times, Praxis, 1993, ISBN 978-1872292182).
9. Le chemin de la vie et la destinée de l'âme après la mort.
10. Ezéchiel.
11. Le mystère des origines.
12. Initiation trinitaire.
13. La liturgie céleste.
14. Marie, Vierge et Mère.
15. Les chemins de l'homme.
16. Le Verbe incarné.
17. La quête de l’Esprit.
18. Le sens de l'exode.
19. Le carême.
