= Third Serbia – Rich Serbia =

Third Serbia – Rich Serbia Трећа Србија – Богата Србија
- President: Aleksandar Protić (2013–2014); Miroslav Parović (2014–2016)
- Founder: Aleksandar Protić; Miroslav Parović; Andrej Fajgelj
- Founded: 2015
- Dissolved: 2016
- Merger of: Third Serbia and Rich Serbia
- Split from: Dveri
- Succeeded by: People's Freedom Movement (Serbia)
- Ideology: National conservatism Social conservatism Euroscepticism
- Political position: Right-wing to far-right

Website
- http://slobodarski.rs

Third Serbia – Rich Serbia (Serbian Cyrillic: Трећа Србија – Богата Србија, romanized: Treća Srbija – Bogata Srbija) was a political party in Serbia. It was created in 2015 by the merger of Third Serbia, formed in 2012 with the party Rich Serbia formed in 2011.

== History ==
=== Third Serbia ===
Third Serbia was registered as an association of citizen in 2012, and was formed at the foundatory general assembly held on 13 October 2013, in Belgrade, as a split from the Movement for Life - Dveri.

Aleksandar Protić, who was a member and producer of the music group Belgrade Syndicate, was elected the first president of the party, and Miroslav Parović, then the head of the committee group, was elected in Novi Sad at the age of 22 from Dveri's electoral lists. In March 2014, at the general assembly at the age of 29 he was elected the second president of Third Serbia as the youngest leader of a political party in Serbia.

The party then went to the polls for the first time in Zemun on 2 June 2013, and won about 2% of the vote in her first political outing. The 2014 elections were the first parliamentary elections in which the party participated independently, and the party had been actively participating ever since.

=== Rich Serbia ===
Rich Serbia was founded in 2011 by journalist and celebrity agriculturist Zaharije Trnavčević.

The goal of the party was to appeal to agronomists and entrepreneurs. Its policies were agrarian and included tripling the agricultural subsidy.

Its founding assembly was held on 22 January, and the party was formally registered on 5 June 2011.

In the 2012 election, BS ran as part of the U-Turn political alliance led by Čedomir Jovanović, the head of the Liberal Democratic Party and won 1 seat. However, almost immediately after the election, it broke from the coalition and joined the parliamentary majority with the Progressives and Socialists, siding with the government of Ivica Dačić, which it continued to support until the 2014 election.

In the 2014 election the party ran in coalition with the Democratic Party and won no seats.

=== Merged ===
In January 2015 the Rich Serbia reached an agreement on beginning cooperation with the Third Serbia led by Miroslav Parović was renamed Third Serbia – Rich Serbia, still led by Parović, effectively a merger of the two groups.

This was opposed by some members of Third Serbia, and they split into a new movement called the Serbian League led by Aleksandar Đurđev.

In July 2015, Miroslav Parović, as the president of Third Serbia – Rich Serbia, using his powers, expelled the secretary general from the party, along with several other members.

Due to the need to adapt to modern trends in European politics, on 17 December 2016 the party bodies made a decision on internal reform, when it merged into the People's Freedom Movement. The term Third Serbia has been retained as the name of the political platform of the People's Freedom Movement.

== Electoral performance ==
Parliamentary elections as Rich Serbia:

Year	Popular vote	% of popular vote	# of seats	Seat change	Coalition	Government
2012	255,546	6.53%	1 / 250	▲1	U-Turn	gov′t support
2014	216,634	6.03%	0 / 250	▼1	With DS-NS-DSHV	non-parliamentary
