= Serbs in Portugal =

Sérvios em Portugal Срби у Португалији Srbi u Portugaliji

Total population
- 425 (2024)

Regions with significant populations
- Lisbon, Algarve

Languages
- Serbian and Portuguese

Religion
- Eastern Orthodoxy (Serbian Orthodox Church)

Serbs in Portugal are Portuguese citizens of ethnic Serb descent and/or Serbia-born persons living in Portugal. According to data from 2024, there were 425 Serbian citizens in Portugal.

== Heritage ==
There is a Serbian Orthodox Church of the Holy Christ of Salvation in Lisbon, consecrated in 2017.

== Notable people ==
- Filip Cveticanin – volleyball player
- Stevan Milovac – football player
- Aleksandar Protić – fashion designer
- Ljubomir Stanišić – restaurateur
- Dejan Tiago-Stankovic – writer
- Vladimir Stojković – football player

== See also ==
- Serb diaspora
- Portugal–Serbia relations
- Serbian Orthodox Eparchy of Western Europe

== Literature ==
- Puzović, Predrag (1996). "Eparhije Srpske pravoslavne crkve u rasejanju" (PDF). Bogoslovlje: Časopis Pravoslavnog bogoslovskog fakulteta u Beogradu. 40 (1–2): 87–96. Archived from the original (PDF) on 8 June 2019.
