= Orthodox Catholic Church of France =

French Christian denomination

The Orthodox Catholic Church of France (L'ECOF, French: Église catholique orthodoxe de France), also known as the Orthodox Church of France (French: Église orthodoxe de France), is an Eastern Orthodox church mostly in France comprising two dioceses and using a reconstruction of the Gallican Rite. Although the OCCF has been in communion with various canonical Eastern Orthodox churches during its history, at present it is not in communion with any canonical body.

== Foundation ==
Louis-Charles Winnaert, a Roman Catholic priest, left the Catholic Church because he supported Modernism.

Winnaert, along with a group of parishioners, joined the Anglican Church in 1918. Winnaert and his adherents then separated from the Anglican Church and joined the Old Catholic Church in 1921.

Winnaert and his adherents then separated from the Old Catholic Church and joined the Liberal Catholic Church in 1922. Their group, Église libre-catholique de France (Free Catholic Church of France), was registered as a religious association in April 1922.

Bishop James Ingall Wedgwood, of the Liberal Catholic Church, consecrated Winnaert as bishop. After Winnaert and his adherents separated from the Liberal Catholic Church, they established the Eglise catholique évangélique (Evangelical Catholic Church) in 1924.

According to The Tablet, at the time of application to come into full communion with the Russian Orthodox Church (ROC) in 1932, Winnaert's group had a membership of 1500 adherents, ministered by six priests and one deacon, in parishes located in Paris, Rouen, Brussels, Holland, and Rome.

The ROC agreed to receive Winnaert and his group into full communion in 1936. The episcopal ordination of Winnaert was declared doubtful.

Winnaert was received into full communion as a priest in 1936 with the condition "that his irregular marriage be dissolved, and that he shall not be raised to the episcopate" but was raised to the rank of archimandrite in the ROC.

Winnaert became administrator of those parishes that were received into full communion with ROC and was supervised by the ordinary of the Russian Churches in Western Europe.

Also associated with the Kovalevsky group, Archimandrite Alexis van der Mensbrugghe, a former Roman Catholic priest, desired to restore an ancient Roman rite, by replacing medieval accretions with Gallican and Byzantine interpolations – though Mensbrugghe remained separate from the OCF. Mensbrugghe was eventually consecrated a bishop of the ROC in 1960, continued developing his Western rite under the auspices of the Moscow Patriarchate, and published a missal in 1962.

== See also ==
- Christianity in France
- Eastern Orthodoxy in France
- Oriental Orthodoxy in France
