= Eastern Orthodoxy in France =

Eastern Orthodoxy presence in France

Eastern Orthodoxy in France is the totality of all Eastern Orthodox churches in France.

According to a 2020 survey, Eastern Orthodox Christians made up 1% of the French population.

== Jurisdictions ==
=== Canonical churches ===
==== With a local bishop ====
- Antiochian Orthodox Metropolis of Western and Central Europe (Greek Orthodox Church of Antioch)
- Georgian Orthodox Eparchy of Saint Nino in Paris (Assembly of Orthodox Bishops of France and Ecumenical Patriarchate of Constantinople)
- Greek Orthodox Metropolis of France (under the Ecumenical Patriarchate of Constantinople)
- Patriarchal Exarchate for Orthodox Parishes of Russian Tradition in Western Europe (Russian Orthodox Church)
- Romanian Orthodox Metropolitanate of Western and Southern Europe (Romanian Orthodox Church)
- Russian Orthodox Diocese of Chersonese (Korsoun) (Russian Orthodox Church)
- Serbian Orthodox Eparchy of Western Europe (Serbian Orthodox Church)
- Diocese of Great Britain and Western Europe (ROCOR)

==== Without a local bishop ====
- Bulgarian Orthodox Diocese of Western and Central Europe (Bulgarian Orthodox Church)

=== Non-canonical churches ===
==== With bishop or archbishop ====
- Orthodox Church of the Gauls
- Orthodox Church of France

== People ==
=== Current hierarchs ===
- Emmanuel (Adamakis) of France
- Gabriel (de Vylder) of Komana
- Luka (Kovacevic) of France and Western Europe

=== Other major figures ===
- Eulogius (Georgievsky) of Paris
- Jean-Nectaire (Kovalevsky) of Saint-Denis

== Organizations and institutions ==
=== Seminary ===
- St. Sergius Orthodox Theological Institute (Paris, France)

=== Monasteries ===
- Orthodox Monastery of the Veil of Our Lady (Bussy-en-Othe, France)

=== Pan-jurisdictional ===
- Assembly of Canonical Orthodox Bishops of France

== See also ==
- Religion in France
- Christianity in France

== Literature ==
- Kiminas, Demetrius (2009). The Ecumenical Patriarchate: A History of Its Metropolitanates with Annotated Hierarch Catalogs. Wildside Press LLC. ISBN 9781434458766.
