= Serbs in the Netherlands =

Serviërs in Nederland Срби у Холандији Srbi u Holandiji

Total population
- 11,817 Serbia-born residents (2024) 20,297 of Serb ancestry (2024)

Regions with significant populations
- South Holland, North Holland, Utrecht

Languages
- Dutch and Serbian

Religion
- Eastern Orthodoxy (Serbian Orthodox Church)

Serbs in the Netherlands or Serbian Dutch are Dutch citizens of Serb ethnic descent or Serbia-born people who reside in the Netherlands. According to data from 2024, there were 11,817 Serbia-born people living in the Netherlands, while number of people of Serb ethnic descent stands at 20,297 people of Serb ethnic descent.

== History ==
The first Serbian immigrants to the Netherlands arrived before the outbreak of the World War I. In 1925, there were 4,000 Yugoslavs in the Netherlands, mostly settled in the southern mining areas. After World War II, especially in the 1960s, a second larger group arrived, which was increased in the 1970s by a wave of business representatives from the socialist Yugoslavia, among which half were of Serb origin.

In the late 1980s, the Serbian immigrant community have had a dozen of associations.

== Heritage ==
In the village of Garderen, municipality of Barneveld, Gelderland province, there is a monument to 29 soldiers of the Royal Serbian Army who died in the Netherlands from the Spanish flu after the end of World War I with the inscription in Serbian and Dutch: "Умрли за Србију" / "Gestorven voor Serbie" ("Fallen for Serbia") and "Благодарна Отаџбина Србија” / "Het Dankbaar Serbische Vaderland" ("Grateful fatherland Serbia").

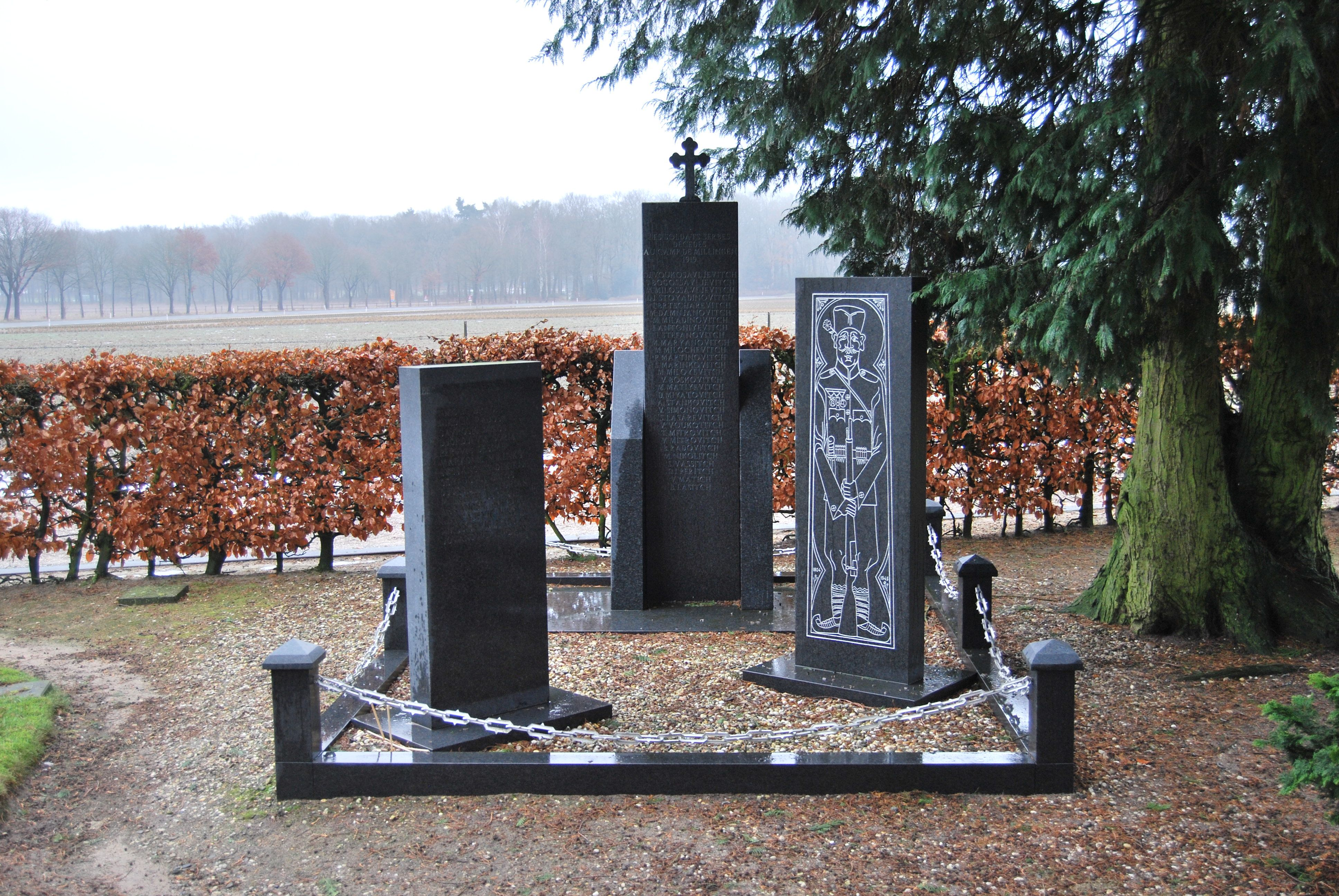

== Notable people ==
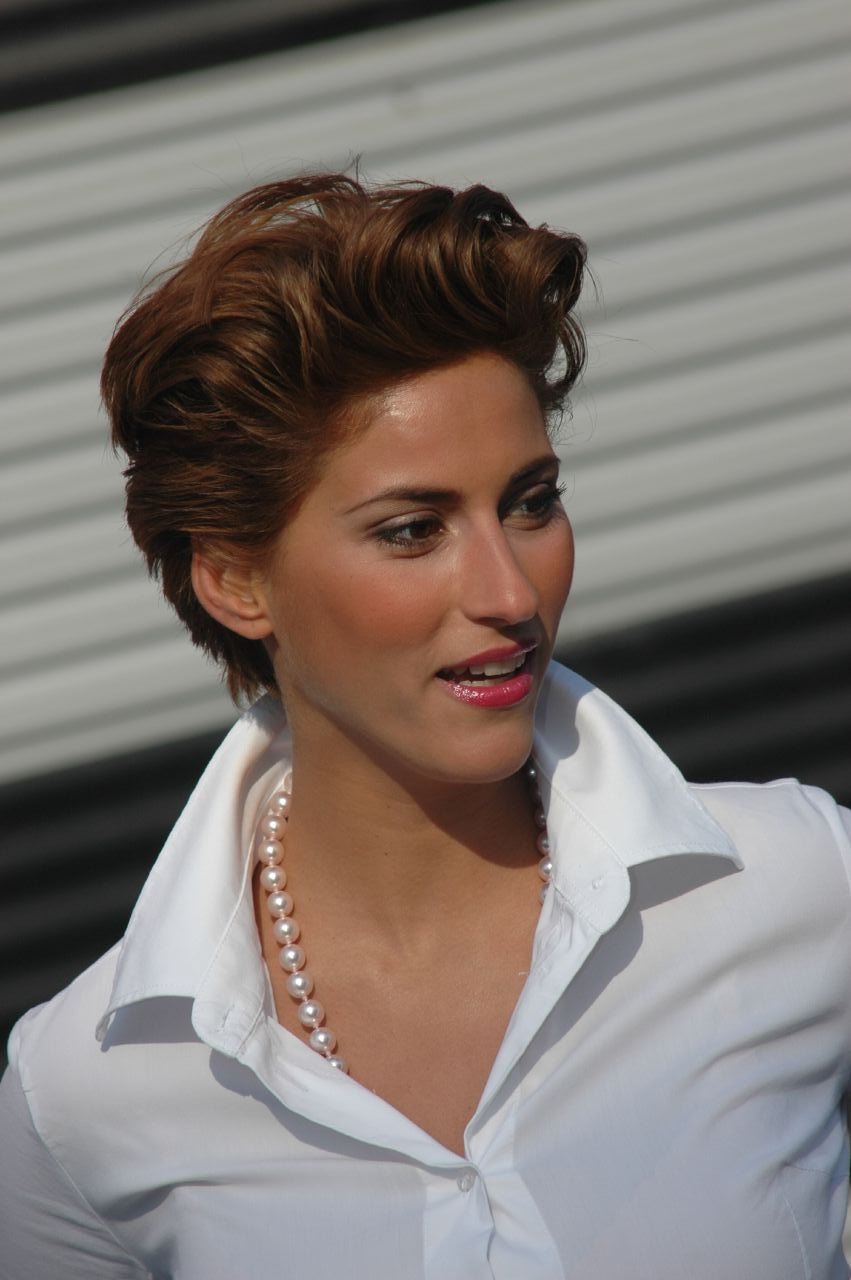
Kristina Bozilovic

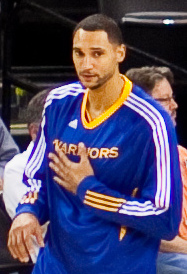
Dan Gadzuric

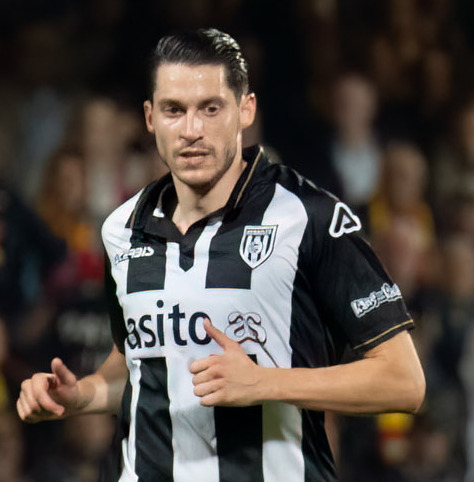
Marko Vejinovic

- Kristina Bozilovic – media personality
- Robin Ciric – kickboxer
- Dan Gadzuric – basketball player
- Irena Pantelic – model
- Igor Sijsling – tennis player
- Marko Vejinović – football player
- Richairo Živković – football player

== See also ==
- Immigration to the Netherlands
- Serb diaspora
- Netherlands–Serbia relations
- Serbian Orthodox Eparchy of Western Europe
