= Serbs in Luxembourg =

D'Serwen zu Lëtzebuerg Срби у Луксембургу Srbi u Luksemburgu
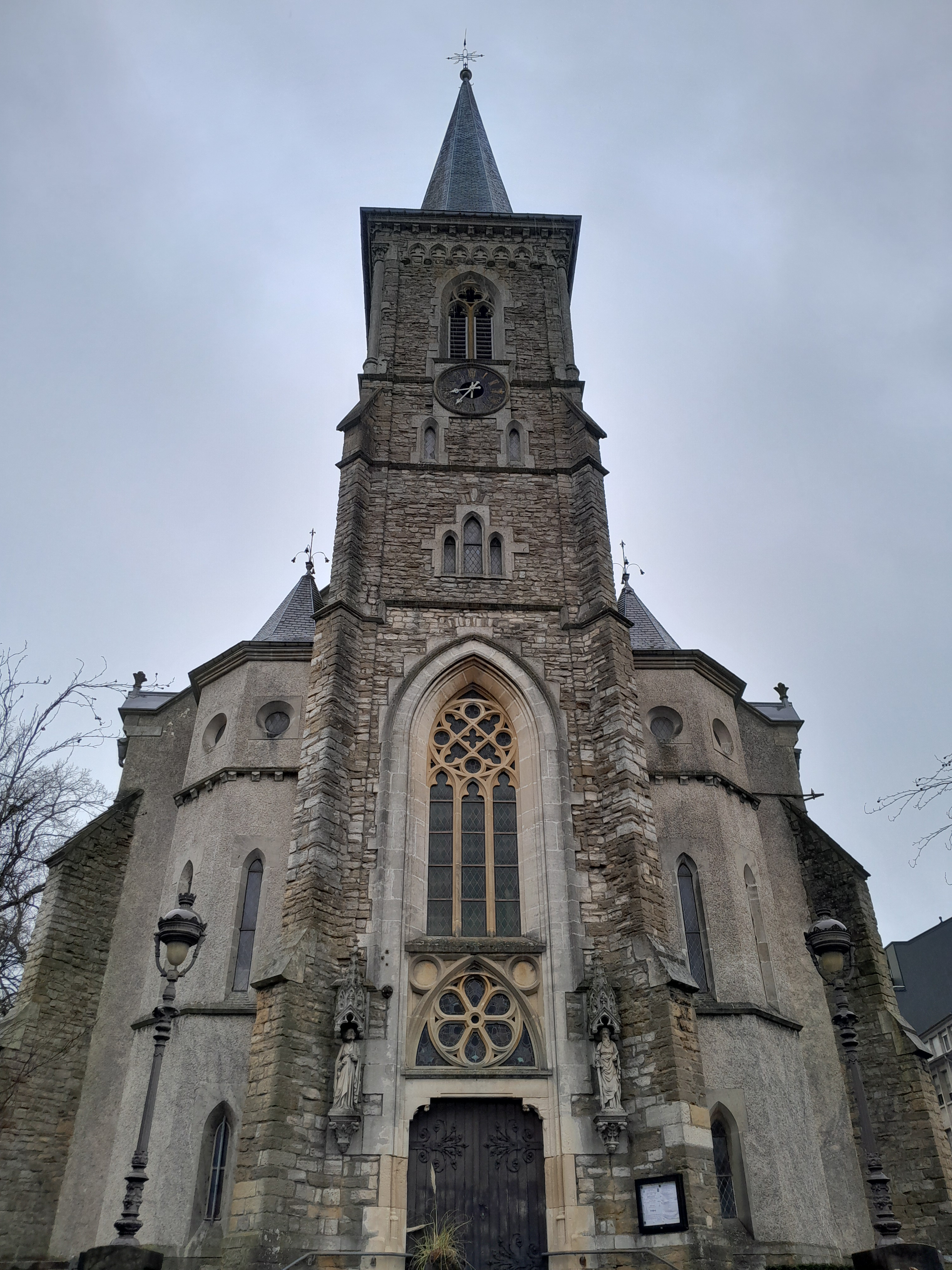
- Saints Constantine and Helen Serbian Orthodox Church in Luxembourg City

Total population
- 1,218 (2021)

Regions with significant populations
- Luxembourg City, Esch-sur-Alzette

Languages
- Luxembourgish and Serbian

Religion
- Eastern Orthodoxy (Serbian Orthodox Church) and Islam

Serbs in Luxembourg or Serbian Luxembourgers are Luxembourg citizens of ethnic Serb descent and/or Serbia-born persons living in Luxembourg. According to data from 2021 census, there were 1,218 Serbian citizens in Luxembourg.

== Organizations ==
The Serbian Cultural Center, with supplementary Serbian language-classess for children, has been operating in Luxembourg City since 1999.

== Notable people ==
- Luka Mladenovic – Olympic table tennis player
- Sergio Pupovac – football player
- Vahid Selimović – football player
- Danel Sinani – football player
- Meris Šehović – politician

== See also ==
- Immigration to Luxembourg
- Serb diaspora
- Luxembourg–Serbia relations
- Serbian Orthodox Eparchy of Western Europe
