= Serbian Orthodox Eparchy of Western Europe =

Diocese of the Serbian Orthodox Church

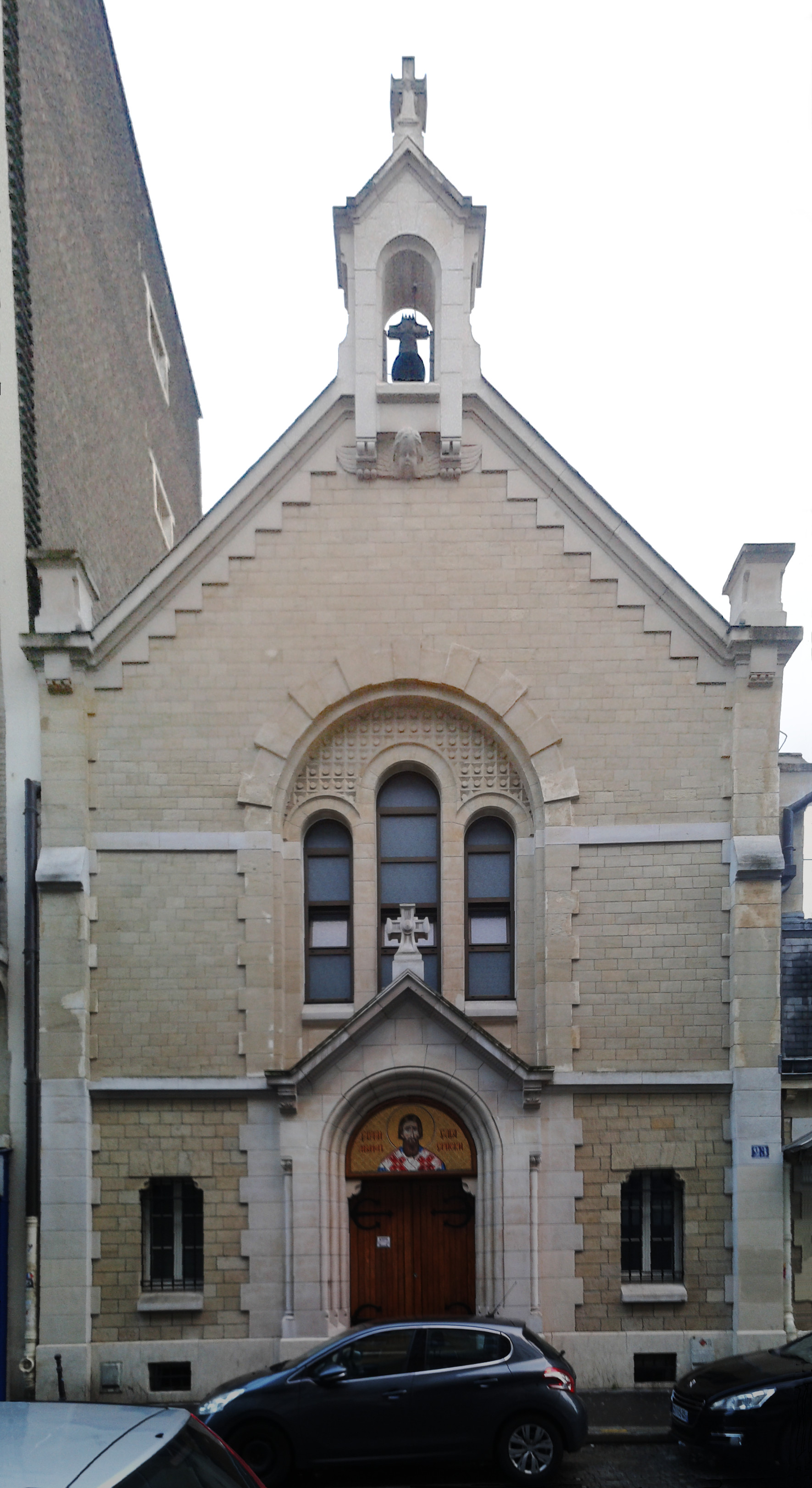
- Saint Sava Cathedral, Paris

Location
- Territory: France, Belgium, Netherlands, Luxembourg, Spain, Portugal
- Headquarters: Paris, France

Information
- Denomination: Eastern Orthodox
- Sui iuris church: Serbian Orthodox Church
- Established: 1994
- Cathedral: Saint Sava Cathedral, Paris
- Language: Church Slavonic, Serbian, French, Spanish, Dutch

Current leadership
- Bishop: Justin Jeremić

Map

Website
- Serbian Orthodox Eparchy of Western Europe

The Serbian Orthodox Eparchy of Western Europe (Serbian: Српска православна епархија западноевропска, romanized: Srpska pravoslavna eparhija zapadnoevropska; French: Diocèse orthodoxe serbe d'Europe occidentale; Spanish: Diócesis ortodoxa serbia d'Europa occidental; Dutch: Servisch-orthodox bisdom West-Europa) is a diocese (eparchy) of the Serbian Orthodox Church, covering France, Belgium, Netherlands, Luxembourg, Spain, and Portugal.

== History ==
The first diocese of the Serbian Orthodox Church with jurisdiction over Western Europe was founded in 1969 as the Serbian Orthodox Eparchy of Western Europe and Australia. In 1973, a separate Eparchy of Australia and New Zealand was established. In 1990, two independent eparchies, the Eparchy of Central Europe and the Eparchy of Britain and Scandinavia, were constituted from the then Eparchy of Western Europe, which subsequently ceased to exist under that name. The successor to the Eparchy of Western Europe (1969–1990) was the Eparchy of Central Europe, which is today known as the Eparchy of Dusseldorf and Germany.

Following the resolution of the schism between the Serbian Orthodox Church and the Free Serbian Orthodox Church in 1991, three Serbian Orthodox eparchies existed in Western Europe: Eparchy of Central Europe, the Eparchy of Britain and Scandinavia, and the Eparchy of Western Europe of the Free Serbian Orthodox Church. At the session of the Holy Assembly of Bishops of the Serbian Orthodox Church in 1994, a reorganization of these eparchies was carried out: new Eparchy of Western Europe was established from parts of the eparchies of Central Europe and Britain-Scandinavia, as well as from the Eparchy of Western Europe of the Free Serbian Orthodox Church. The former Bishop of Western Europe of the Free Serbian Orthodox Church, Damaskin (Davidović), was appointed the first Bishop of the Eparchy of Western Europe of the Serbian Orthodox Church. In 1999, Bishop Luka (Kovačević) was appointed Bishop of Western Europe, a position he held until his retirement in 2021. At its session in 2022, the Holy Assembly of Bishops of the Serbian Orthodox Church elected Vicar Bishop Justin (Jeremić) as the new Bishop of Western Europe.

== Structure ==
The Serbian Orthodox Eparchy of Western Europe comprises 8 parishes, of which 16 in France, 11 in Spain, 8 in the Netherlands, 5 in Belgium, and one each in Portugal and Luxembourg. The episcopal see is located at the Saint Sava Cathedral in Paris while the diocese operates 62 places of worship (30 in France, 18 in Spain, 9 in the Netherlands, 3 in Belgium, 2 in Portugal, and one in Luxembourg) and 4 monasteries (3 in France and one in Spain). In 15 parishes, services are regularly celebrated on Sundays and public holidays, while in 12 parishes they are held two or more times a month. In 29 missionary places of worship, services are celebrated once a month, and there are also 7 chapels where people officiate occasionally.

The diocese is multiethnic and multilingual and has a distinctly missionary character. The clergy and monks include thirteen ethnicities (Serbs, French, Catalans, Spanish-Castillians, Basques, Galicians, Spanish, Portuguese, Mexicans, Brazilians, Dutch, Russians, Ukrainians, Romanians, English). Parishes do not have the financial capacity to support priests, except in Paris, Strasbourg, Rotterdam and Amsterdam, while in Brussels and Luxembourg, priests receive salaries from the state. In all other places of worship, priests have civilian jobs.

== Gallery ==
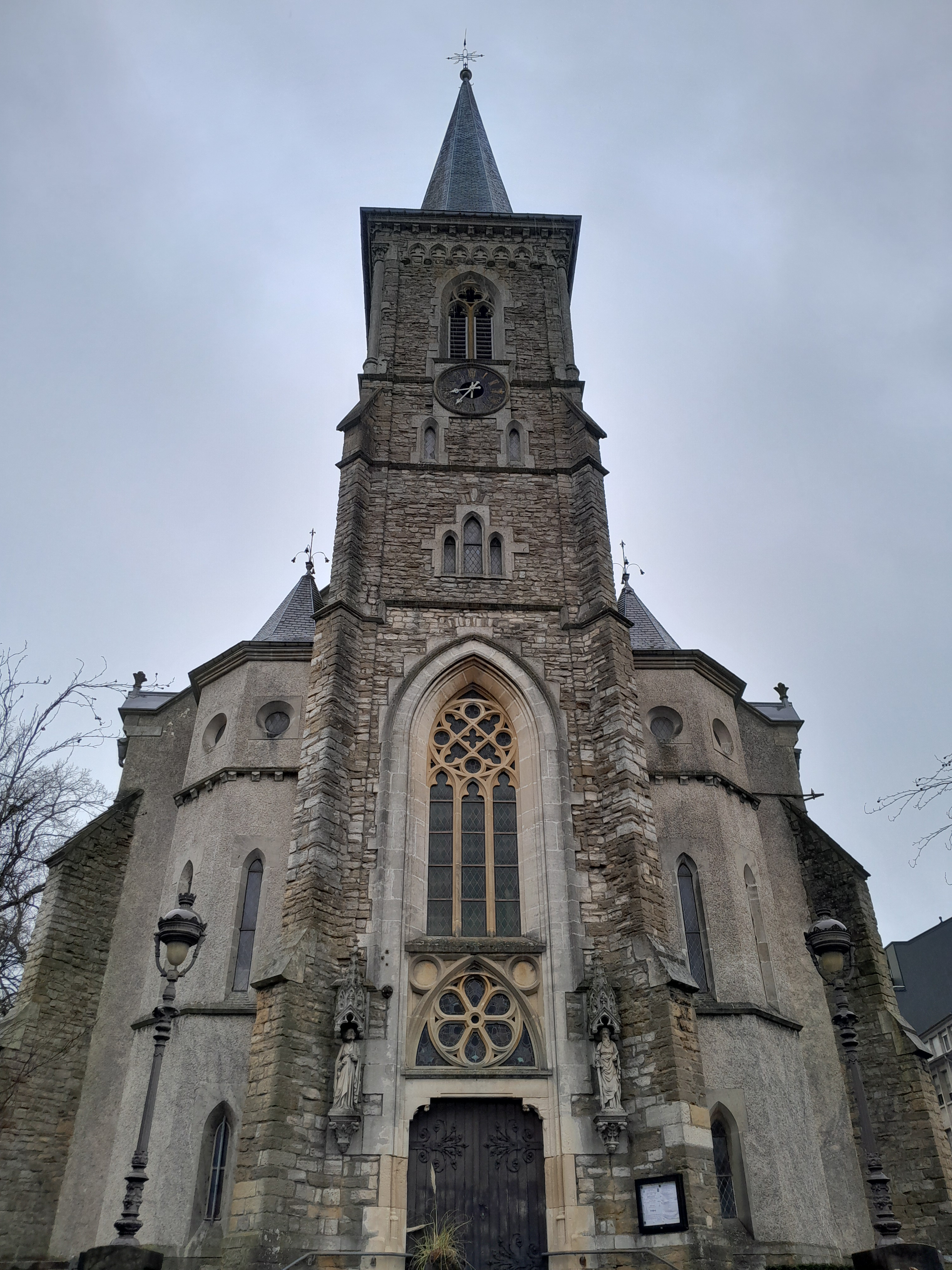
Saints Constantine and Helen Church (Luxembourg City, Luxembourg)

== See also ==
- Eastern Orthodoxy in France
- Eastern Orthodoxy in Spain
- Assembly of Canonical Orthodox Bishops of France
- Assembly of Canonical Orthodox Bishops of Spain and Portugal
- Assembly of Canonical Orthodox Bishops of Belgium, Holland, and Luxembourg
- Eparchies and metropolitanates of the Serbian Orthodox Church
- Serbs in France
- Serbs in Spain
- Serbs in the Netherlands
- Serbs in Portugal
- Serbs in Luxembourg
