= French Coptic Orthodox Church =

Franco-Coptic religious jurisdiction

- Bishopric

Oriental Orthodox

Location
- Territory: France, Switzerland
- Metropolitan: Toulon

Information
- Denomination: Oriental Orthodox
- Rite: Alexandrian
- Established: 1974 A.D.

Current leadership
- Parent church: Coptic Orthodox Church
- Pope: Tawadros II
- Metropolitan Bishop: vacant

The French Coptic Orthodox Church (French: Métropole copte orthodoxe de France) is a Coptic Orthodox jurisdiction centered in France.

== History ==
Coptic immigration to France began as early as 1801 after the French Invasion of Egypt and there was significant immigration after the 1952 Egyptian revolution.

The church was canonically instituted by Pope Shenouda III on 2 July 1974 as the French Coptic Orthodox Eparchy. Its first bishop was Jan Frederik Nico Blom van Assendelft-Altland (Marcos). Altland was previously a prelate within the independent sacramental movement, and founder of the Primitive Apostolic Orthodox Church of the Syro-Byzantine Tradition. The Primitive Apostolic Orthodox Church of the Syro-Byzantine Tradition was received into the Coptic Orthodox Church in 1973.

On 18 June 1994, Pope Shenouda raised the status of the eparchy to the French Coptic Orthodox Church, a new body.

The church was first headed by Metropolitan Marcos until his death on 11 May 2008. He was then succeeded by Athanasius until 2023.

== Diocesan bishops ==
- Luka, Diocesan bishop of the Holy Diocese of Geneva (Switzerland) and Southern France (2013 – present)
- Marc, Diocesan bishop of the Holy Diocese of Paris and all Northern France (2015 – present)

== See also ==
- Catholic Church in France
- Christianity in Africa
- Christianity in France
- Copts
- Coptic diaspora
- Coptic Orthodox Church in Europe
- Eastern Orthodoxy in France
- List of Coptic Orthodox Popes of Alexandria
- Patriarch of Alexandria
- Religion in France
- Protestantism in France
