= Orthodox Church of the Gauls =

Self-governing Christian church

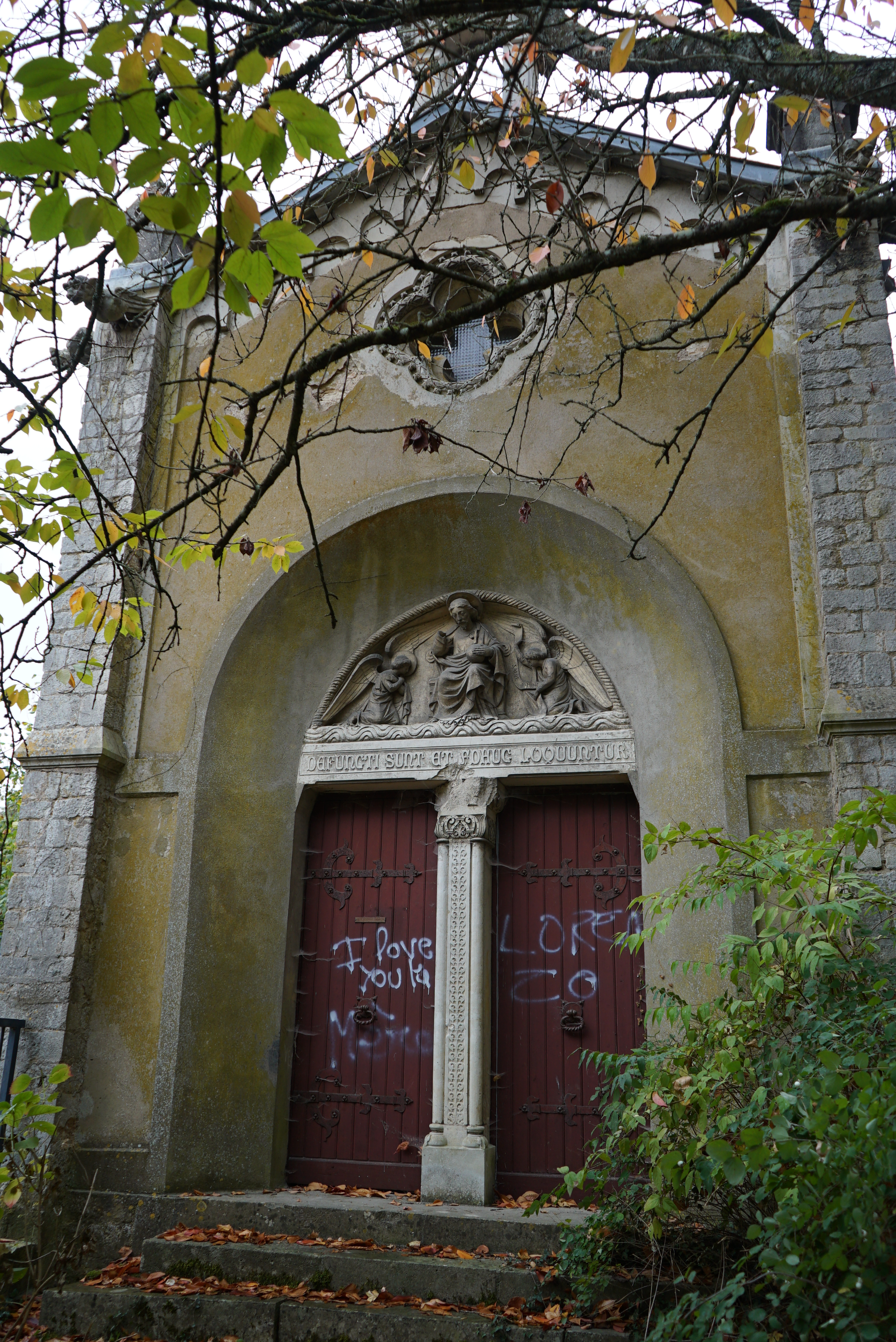
- Orthodox Church of the Gauls chapel of Rémicourt, Villers-lès-Nancy
- Classification: Non-Chalcedonian
- Orientation: Eastern Christianity
- Theology: Oriental Orthodox theology
- Polity: Episcopal
- Associations: Communion of Western Orthodox Churches
- Liturgy: Western Rite Orthodox
- Official website: eglise-orthodoxe.eu

The Orthodox Church of the Gauls (OCG; French: Église Orthodoxe des Gaules, EOG) is a self-governing, Western Rite Orthodox Christian church formed in 2006. The OCG is part of the Communion of Western Orthodox Churches.

== History ==
=== Eastern Orthodoxy ===
In 1924 Louis-Charles Winnaert, a former Roman Catholic priest, along with his adherents, formed the Eglise catholique évangélique (Evangelical Catholic Church), an Independent Catholic church.

Differences between the liturgical vision of Kovalevsky, on the one hand, and Chambault and Mensbrugghe, on the other, as well as news of the plans of Patriarch Alexy I of Moscow to have Kovalevsky consecrated as bishop of the Western Orthodox Church (WOC), led to conflict. False accusations of impropriety by Kovalevsky, brought by Chambault and Mensbrugghe in 1953, resulted in the decision being taken by the Patriarch to remove Kovalevsky from his role of administrator of the WOC, without further investigation. When the deception was subsequently realised after an eventual investigation in September of the same year, an envoy was sent to Kovalevsky to apologise for the hasty judgement. However, it was too late. Kovalevsky had already resigned from the Russian Orthodox Church (ROC), and the parishes and majority of the clergy of the WOC had departed with him.

=== Oriental Orthodoxy ===
After a period of negotiation, a group of the Orthodox Church of the Gauls was welcomed into the fold of the French Coptic Orthodox Church (FCOC) in 2000. The group comprised the following communities, as well as a number of other disparate clergy:

- The monastic community of Saint Michel and Saint Martin, which follows the Rule of Saint Benedict.
- The Bethany Community – a lay community for hesychastic spirituality, led at the time by Father Alphonse and Rachel Goettmann at Gorze.

However, some years later, in 2005, Abba Marcos issued a letter insisting that the clergy must adopt the Coptic rite and, moreover, making the claim that the use of the Western liturgies had never been authorised by him. Having been afforded no opportunity to appeal against this decision, the affected clergy petitioned Pope Shenouda III of Alexandria in February 2006 for an audience to discuss the matter further. When they had not received a response by June of the same year, it became clear that remaining with the FCOC would mean abandoning their Western Orthodox liturgical and spiritual heritage. Therefore, the clergy resigned from the FCOC, taking their communities with them.

=== Communion of Western Orthodox Churches ===
In 2007, the Orthodox Church of the Gauls, the French Orthodox Church, and the Celtic Orthodox Church established the Communion of Western Orthodox Churches.

In the years of stability since then, through organic expansion and the founding of new communities, the OCG has grown numerically to comprise a number of parishes, missions, and monastic houses in France, Belgium, Spain, Poland, the United States of America, and Brazil.

In August 2018, the clergy of the Priestly Fraternity of Ss Cyril and Methodius, along with their congregations, were received by Bishop Gregory and established by his decree as the Polish exarchate of the OCG, with Bishop Gorazd Sawicki as its exarch.

== Doctrine ==
The OCG professes the doctrinal teachings of the ecumenical councils of Nicea, Constantinople, and Ephesus.

== Relations with other churches ==
Since April 2009, the OCG is in full communion with the Ukrainian Orthodox Church in America. (Note: This organization has used the legal name Ukrainian Orthodox Church in America since 2005.)
