= Serbs in France =

Serbes en France Срби у Француској Srbi u Francuskoj
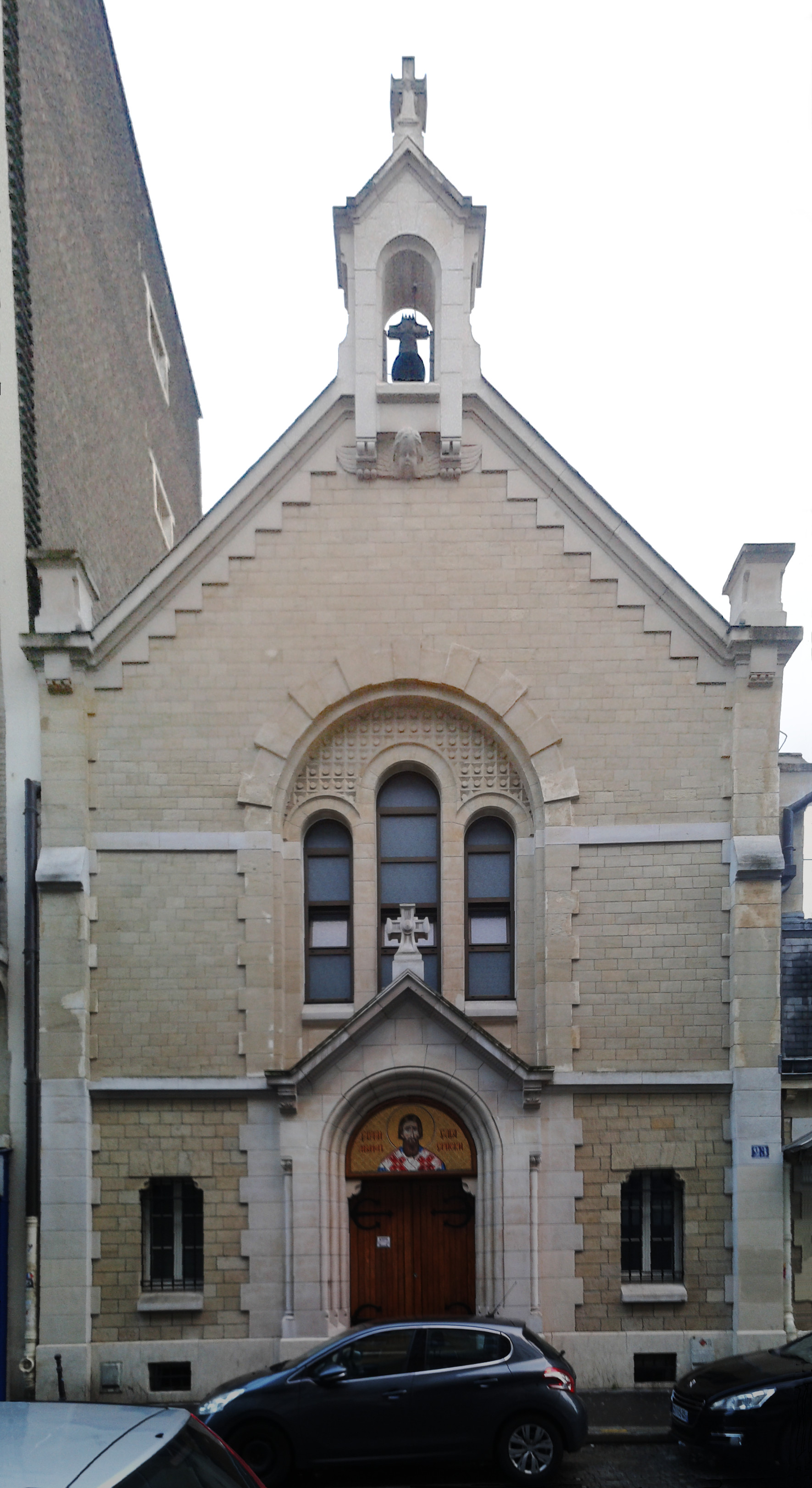
- The Sаint Sava Serbian Orthodox Cathedral in Paris

Total population
- 74,000 Serbia-born residents (2023) ~120,000 of Serb ancestry (est.)

Regions with significant populations
- Île de France, Grand Est, Bourgogne-Franche-Comté, Auvergne-Rhône-Alpes

Languages
- French and Serbian

Religion
- Eastern Orthodoxy (Serbian Orthodox Church)

Serbs in France or French Serbs are French citizens of ethnic Serb ancestry and/or Serbia-born persons living in France. According to data from 2023, there were 74,000 Serbia-born people living in France, while estimated number of people of Serb ethnic descent (including French citizens with full or partial Serb ethnic descent) stands at around 120,000.

== History ==
The history of the Serbs in France is deeply intertwined with cultural, educational, and political exchanges between France and Serbia, dating back to the 19th century when France was a hub for Serbian intellectuals and elites. Many Serbs, aspiring to modernize their young nation, studied at French universities, especially in Paris, fostering a generation of "Parisians" who shaped Serbia's political and cultural development. By 1886, this led to the establishment of the "Serbian Reading Room" (Srbadija) in Paris, a cultural hub for expatriates that received Serbian newspapers. This early community was small and elite-driven, focused on education and advocacy rather than mass settlement.

The largest influx occurred during the 1960s and 1970s as part of France's post-war economic boom, which recruited guest workers from Yugoslavia via bilateral agreements. Peugeot, facing labor shortages in its Sochaux plant, hired thousands of young Yugoslav men starting in 1965, peaking at nearly 2,800 in 1972 alone. These "Yugoslav" workers, predominantly Serbs in later waves, faced harsh realities: segregated company housing led to tensions with other immigrant groups, while economic pressures like remittances home sparked despair, including suicides during 1973 strikes.

== Demographics ==
According to the 2023 data, there were 74,000 Serbia-born people in France. However, these figures generally do not include the majority of second and third-generation of Serbs in France. The Serbian Ministry of Diaspora estimates that there are around 120,000 people in France with partial or full Serb ancestry.

The Serbian community is mainly concentrated in two areas: the Greater Paris, and eastern regions of Grand Est (with hubs in Strasbourg and Mulhouse), Bourgogne-Franche-Comté (with hubs in industrial cities of Montbeliard and Belfort), and Auvergne-Rhône-Alpes (Lyon and Grenoble, in particular).

Serbs in France predominantly belong to the Eastern Orthodoxy with the Serbian Orthodox Church as the traditional church. There is Serbian Orthodox diocese, the Serbian Orthodox Eparchy of Western Europe, encompassing 18 parishes across France with 30 places of worship among which 4 churches (2 in Paris and its suburbs, Strasbourg, Nancy) as well as monastery in Uchon.

== Notable people ==
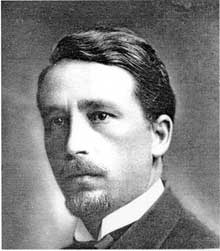
Ivan Đaja

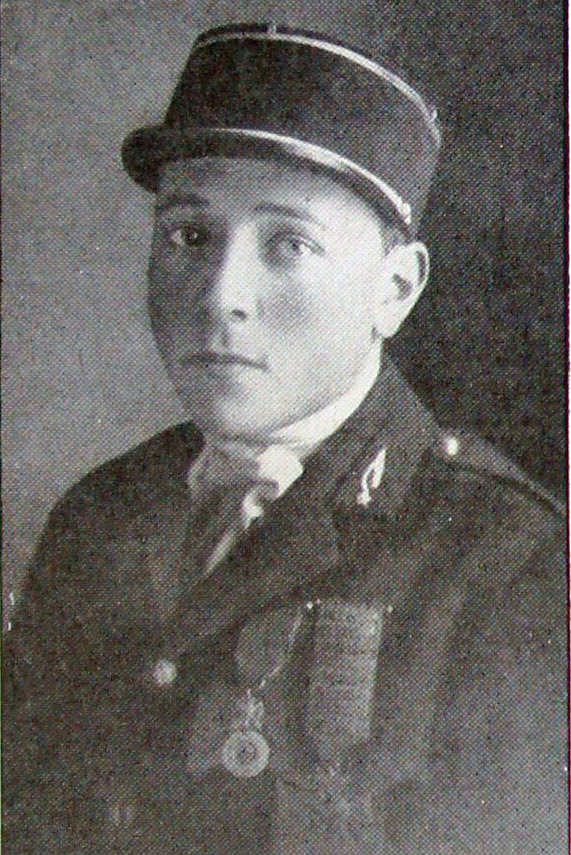
Pierre Marinovitch

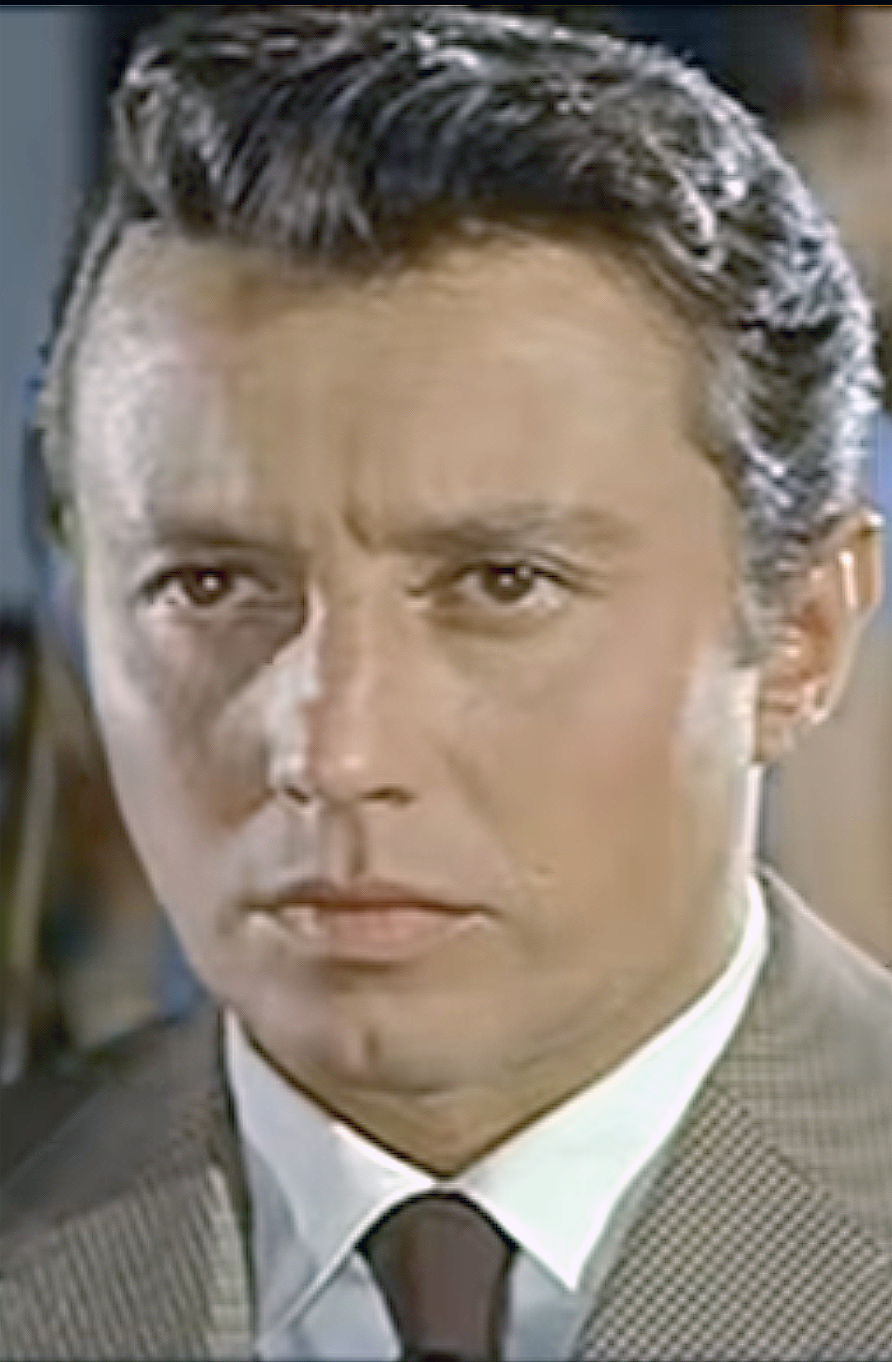
Michel Auclair

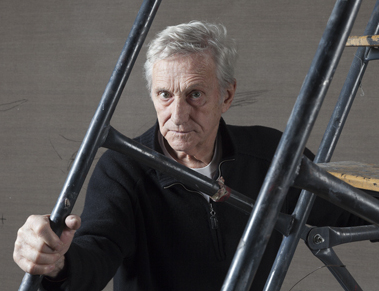
Vladimir Veličković

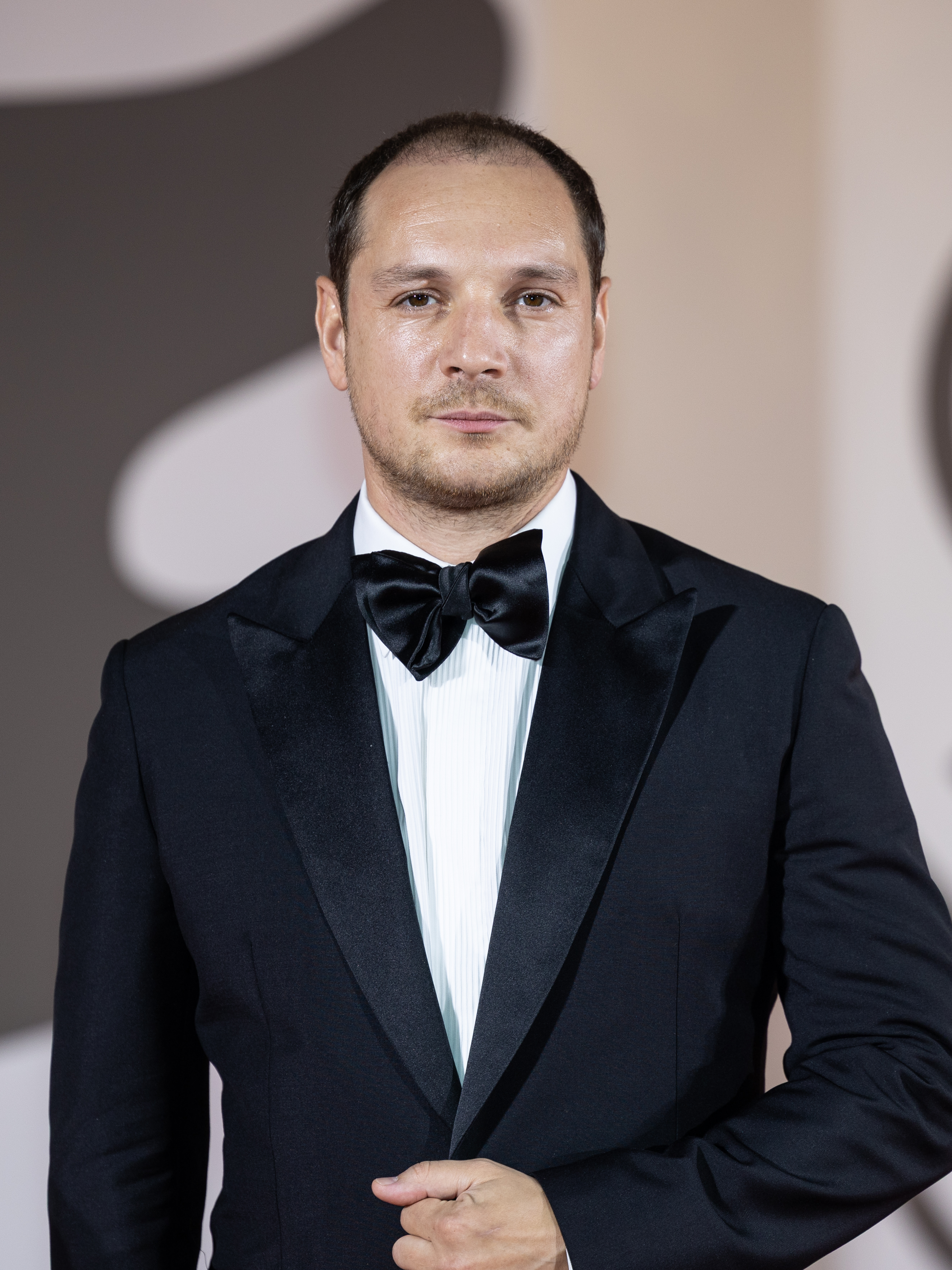
Alexis Manenti

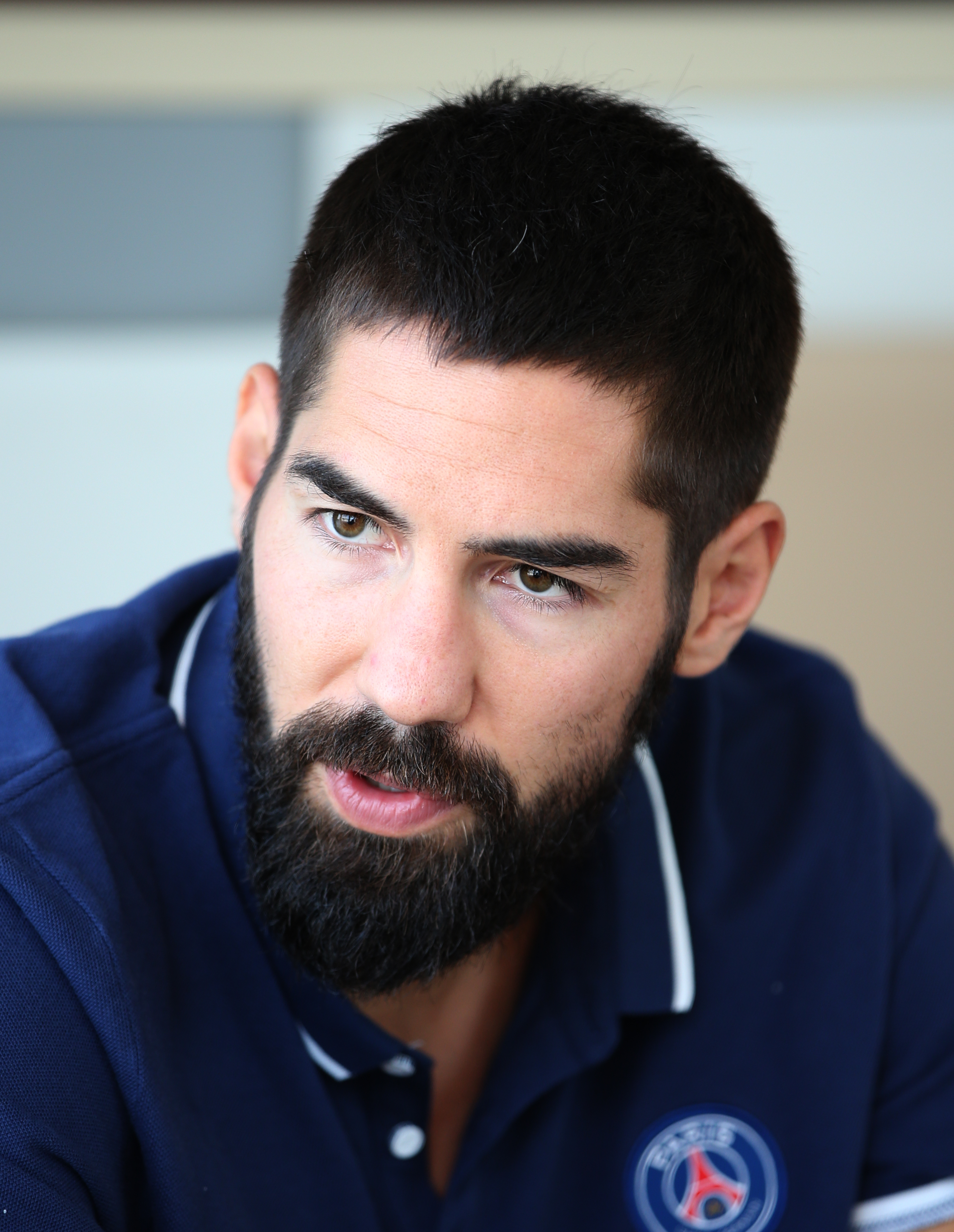
Nikola Karabatić

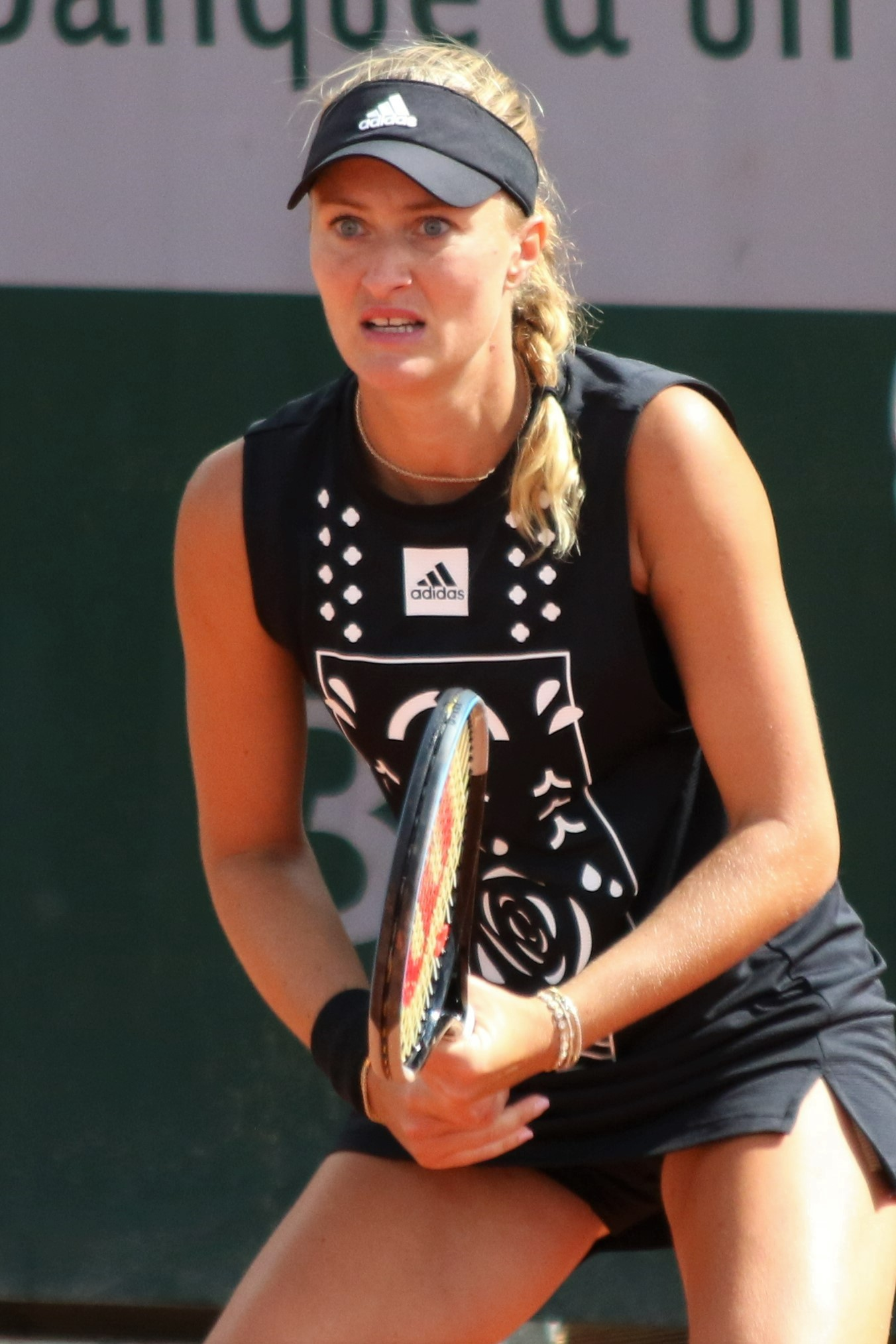
Kristina Mladenovic

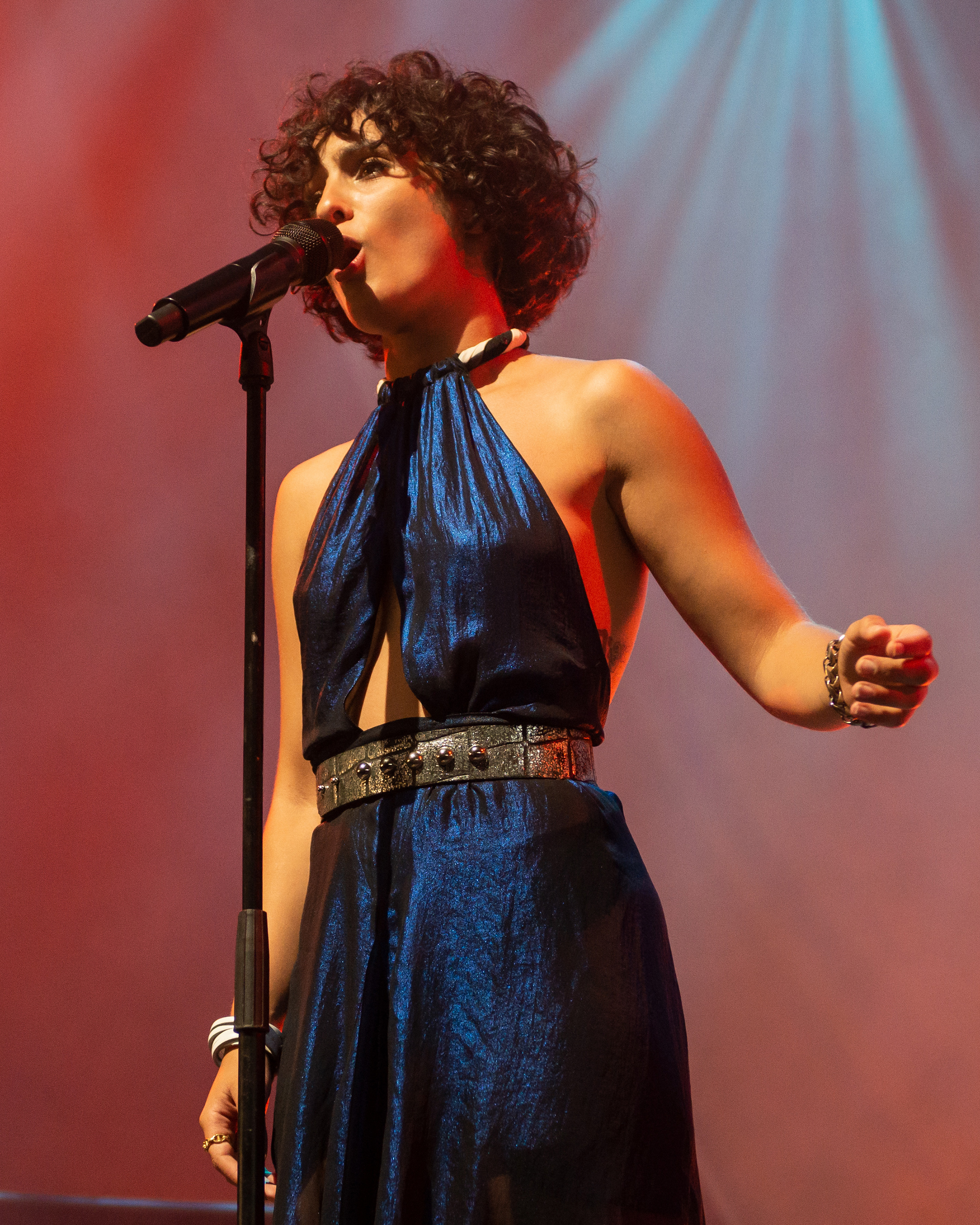
Barbara Pravi

- Ivan Đaja – scientist
- Michel Auclair – actor, paternal Serb descent
- Sara Brajovic – model and actress
- Alexis Josic – architect
- Luka Karabatic – handball player, maternal Serb descent
- Nikola Karabatić – handball player, maternal Serb descent
- Sacha Lakic – designer
- Alexis Manenti – actor, maternal Serb descent
- Pierre Marinovitch – flying ace, paternal Serb descent
- Kristina Mladenovic – tennis player
- Aleksandar Nikolic – politician, paternal Serb descent
- Filip Nikolic – singer
- Dragan Pechmalbec – handball player
- Barbara Pravi – singer and actress, paternal Serb descent
- Sebastian – musician, maternal Serb descent
- Nina Stojiljković – volleyball player
- Vladimir Veličković – painter
- Godefroy Vujicic – musician

== See also ==
- Immigration to France
- Serb diaspora
- France–Serbia relations
- Serbian Orthodox Eparchy of Western Europe
