= Miroslav Parović =

Serbian politician

- Мирослав Паровић
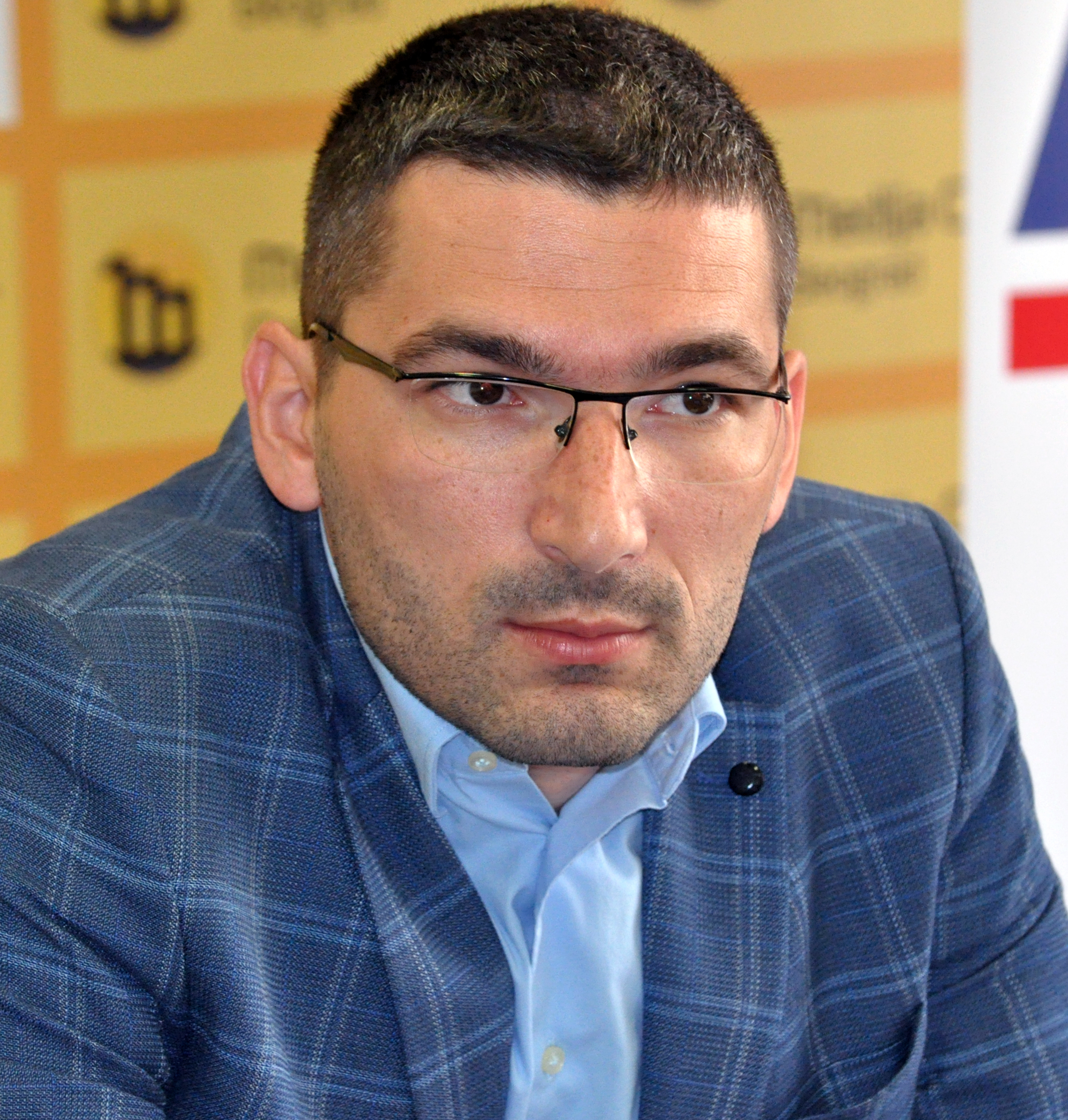
- Parović in 2014.

Personal details
- Born: July 14, 1984 (age 42) Zrenjanin, SR Serbia, SFR Yugoslavia
- Party: Third Serbia (2012–2016); People's Freedom Movement (2016–present)
- Education: University of Novi Sad Faculty of Technical Sciences
- Profession: Electrical Engineering and Computer Science

Miroslav Parović (pronounced [mǐrɔ̝slav̞ pǎːroʋit͡ɕ]; Serbian Cyrillic: Мирослав Паровић; born July 14, 1984) is a Serbian politician and the president of the People's Freedom Movement.

== Biography ==
Parović attended primary school in the village of Jaša Tomić, and received secondary education at the "Nikola Tesla" secondary school of electrical engineering in Zrenjanin. He received his Master's Degree in Electrical Engineering and Computer Science from the University of Novi Sad Faculty of Technical Sciences as one of the best students of his generation (with an average score of 9.82).

He has worked on numerous development projects and writing professional and scientific work in the field of electric engineering, renewable energy and energy efficiency. As a farmer child he is particularly interested in the development of the concept of sustainable villages in the 21st century and finds that Serbia has to produce healthy food, clean energy and new technologies.

He is active for more than 10 years in the social scene. He was a spokesman on hundreds of debates, gatherings, protests, television and radio broadcasts. He is the head of the councilor group Third Serbia (Serbian: Трећа Србија) in the City of Novi Sad and the adviser to the mayor of Novi Sad in the field of energetic.

He strives to proclaim the concept of active patriotism throughout his life. His political model is Stefan Lazarevic Despot of Serbia, also his favorite mythical character is Strahinja Banović. For the upcoming presidential elections in Serbia is the first of all the candidates announced his candidacy.

The first politician in Serbia who is at the highest level received in the Crimean government and administration of the City of Sevastopol in December 2014. In 2014 it was officially admitted to the European Parliament by the deputies of the National Front, Jean-Luc Schaffhauser. Presided and created an international conference "New Europe", 17/10/2014., at which participants from leading European states discussed the possibility of establishing shaft Paris-Berlin-Moscow-Belgrade as a way for Europe to break away from the dominance of NATO.

He lives in Novi Sad. He is married to Snežana and has a daughter Lenka.

== See also ==
- Blagoje Parović
