= Saint Sava Serbian Orthodox Cathedral (Paris) =

Serbian Orthodox cathedral in Paris, France

Coordinates: 48°53′37″N 2°21′00″E

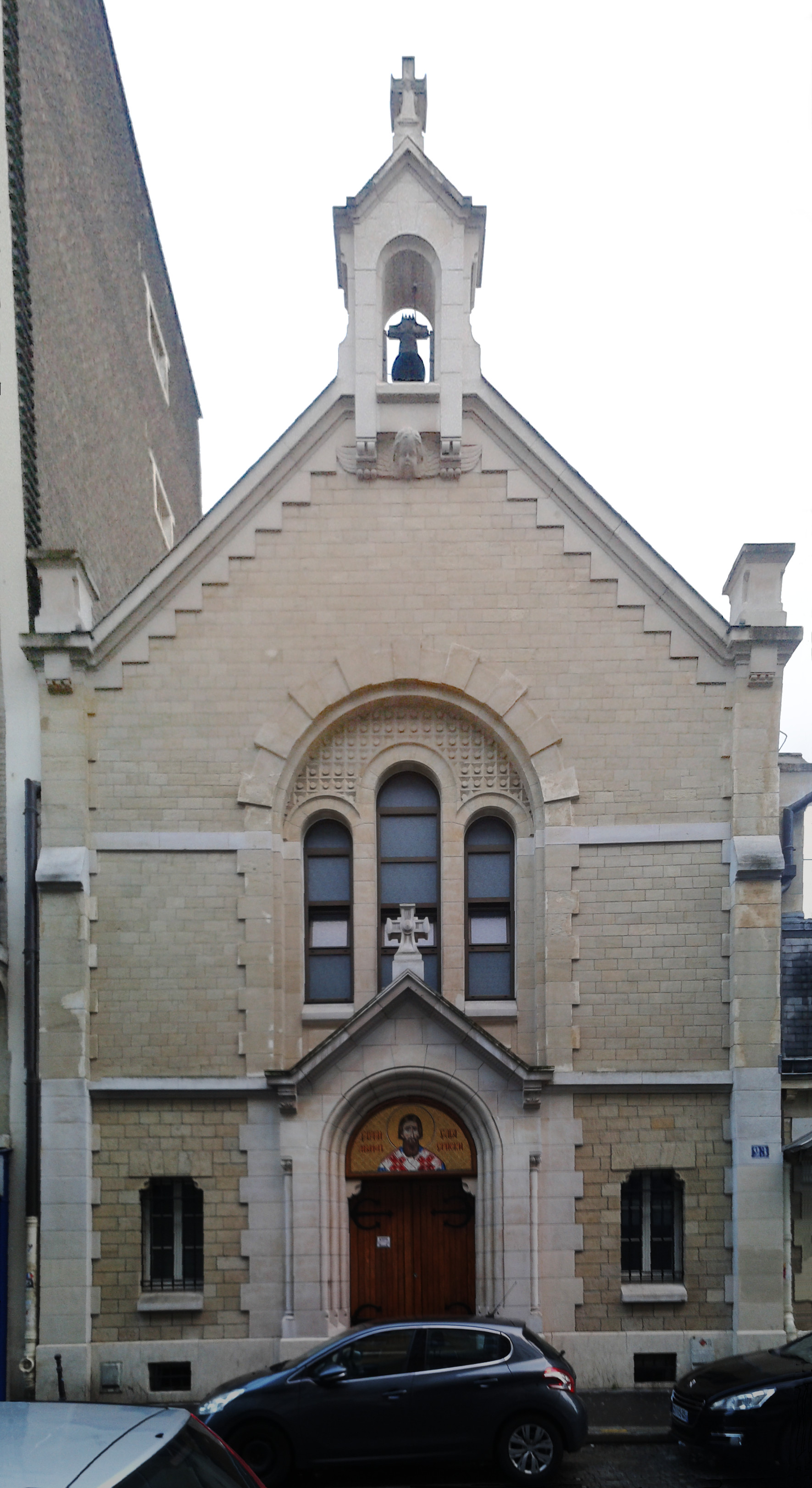
- Saint Sava Serbian Orthodox Cathedral
- Saint Sava Serbian Orthodox Cathedral
- Location: 23 rue du Simplon, 18th arrondissement, Paris
- Country: France
- Denomination: Serbian Orthodox Church

History
- Dedication: Saint Sava

Architecture
- Years built: 1905

Administration
- Diocese: Serbian Orthodox Eparchy of Western Europe

Saint Sava Serbian Orthodox Cathedral (French: Cathédrale Saint-Sava; Serbian: Саборна црква светог Саве, romanized: Saborna crkva svetog Save) is an Eastern Orthodox church located in Paris, France. It is under jurisdiction of the Serbian Orthodox Eparchy of Western Europe of the Serbian Orthodox Church and serves as its cathedral church. It is dedicated to Saint Sava, the first Archbishop of the Serbian Orthodox Church.

== History ==
The church had been used as Protestant church in the past. From 1962 it was rented for worship, and in 1984 it was purchased and converted to the Orthodox church.

== See also ==
- Serbian Orthodox Eparchy of Western Europe
- Serbs in France
