= People's Freedom Movement (Serbia) =

Political party in Serbia

People's Freedom Movement Народни слободарски покрет
- Abbreviation: NSP
- Leader: Miroslav Parović
- Founded: 17 December 2016
- Split from: Third Serbia – Rich Serbia
- Ideology: National conservatism; Right-wing populism
- Political position: Far-right
- European affiliation: Identity and Democracy (cooperation)
- Colors: Blue; Red
- National Assembly: 0 / 250
- Assembly of Vojvodina: 0 / 120
- City Assembly of Belgrade: 0 / 110

Website
- slobodarski.rs

The People's Freedom Movement (Serbian: Народни слободарски покрет, romanized: Narodni slobodarski pokret, NSP) is a far-right political party in Serbia. It is led by Miroslav Parović.

== History ==
In December 2016, a group of members of the Third Serbia political party split from the party and formed the People's Freedom Movement with Miroslav Parović being selected as the president of the newly formed People's Freedom Movement. The president of the party, Miroslav Parović finished 11th in 2017 Serbian presidential election with 0.32% of the votes. In November 2019, the party announced that they will participate in the 2020 Serbian parliamentary election in the coalition with New Serbia.

It did not participate in the 2022 general elections, although it did held campaigns that were organized in opposition to Aleksandar Vučić.

== Political platform ==
People's Freedom Movement advocates a conservative ideology and it believes that only an orderly, legal state can be free and sovereign. The party advocates democratic organization and the rule of law. As anti-globalists and Euro-realists, they stand for "Europe from Lisbon to Vladivostok", with the "Paris-Berlin-Moscow axis", recognizing Belgrade as one of the cornerstones of New Europe. They see themselves among the sovereignists, who fight for the principles of freedom, equality and solidarity, and call themselves "freemen". The party maintains good relations with similar parties in Europe. They can often be seen at events in the company of members of the National Rally from France, the The Republicans of France, the Freedom Party of Austria, and the Alternative for Germany.

== Presidents of the People's Freedom Movement ==
#	President	Born-Died	Term start	Term end
	Miroslav Parović	1984–	17 December 2016	Incumbent

== Electoral performance ==
=== Parliamentary elections ===
National Assembly of Serbia
Year	Popular vote	% of popular vote	# of seats	Seat change	Coalition	Government
2020	7,873	0.24%	0 / 250	0	With NS	non-parliamentary
2022	Did not participate		0 / 250	0	—	non-parliamentary

=== Presidential elections ===
President of Serbia
Year	Candidate	1st round votes		% of popular vote	2nd round votes		% of popular vote
2017	Miroslav Parović	11th	11,540	0.32%	—	—	—
2022	Did not participate	—	—	—	—	—	—
