= Gorze =

- Commune
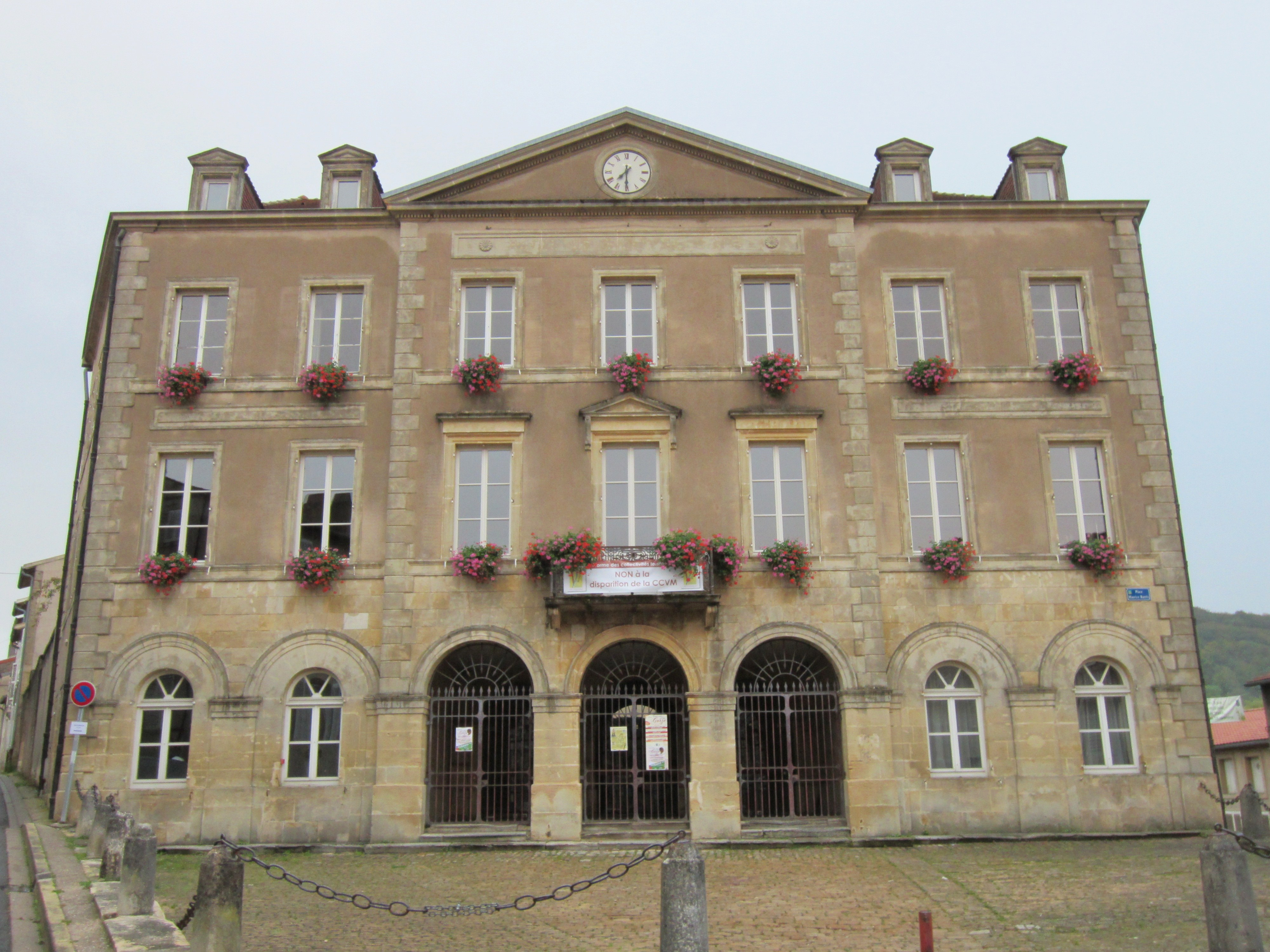
- The town hall in Gorze

- Coat of arms
- Location of Gorze
- Location within France Location within Grand Est
- Coordinates: 49°03′14″N 5°59′56″E
- Country: France
- Region: Grand Est
- Department: Moselle
- Arrondissement: Metz
- Canton: Les Coteaux de Moselle
- Intercommunality: Mad et Moselle

Government
  - Mayor (2020–2026): Frédéric Levee
- Area^{1}: 17.94 km^{2} (6.93 sq mi)
- Highest elevation: 356 m (1,168 ft)
- Lowest elevation: 169 m (554 ft)
- Population (2023): 1,120
  - Density: 62.4/km^{2} (162/sq mi)
- Time zone: UTC+01:00 (CET)
  - Summer (DST): UTC+02:00 (CEST)
- INSEE/Postal code: 57254 /57680
- ^{1} French Land Register data, which excludes lakes, ponds, glaciers > 1 km^{2} (0.386 sq mi or 247 acres) and river estuaries.

Gorze (French pronunciation: [ɡɔʁz]; German: Gorz) is a commune in the Moselle department in Grand Est in north-eastern France.

== Sites and monuments ==
Gorze Abbey was confiscated as public property during the French Revolution; it has since been restored and utilised for a variety of public uses.

== See also ==
- Communes of the Moselle department
- Parc naturel régional de Lorraine
