= Christianity in France =

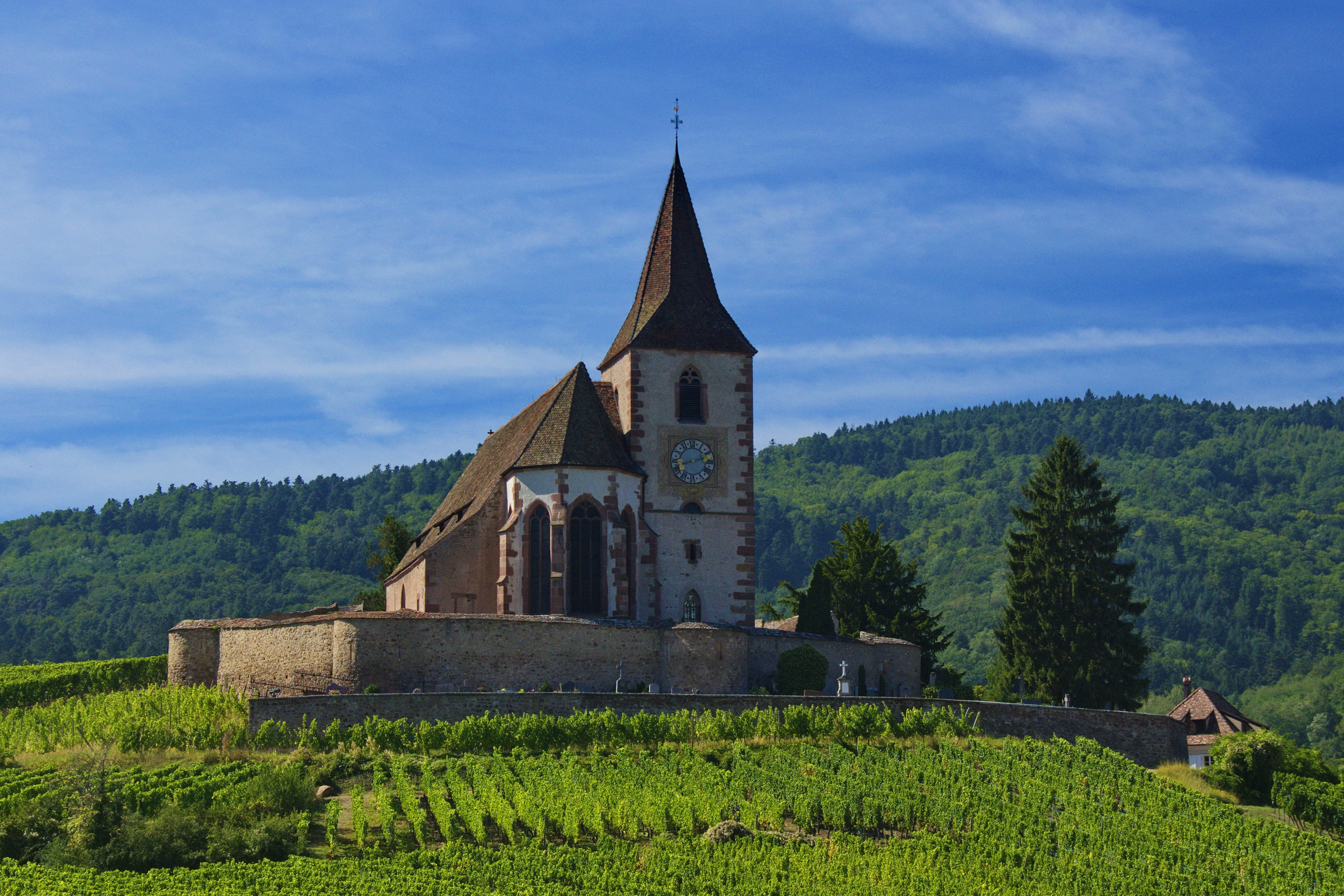
Catholic and Lutheran simultaneum (mixed church) in Hunawihr, Haut-Rhin.

Christianity in France is the largest religion in the country.

== Demographics ==
According to a survey held by Institut français d'opinion publique (Ifop) for the Institut Montaigne think-tank, 51.1% of the total population of France was Christian in 2016. The following year, a survey by Ipsos focused on Protestants and based on 31,155 interviews found that 57.5% of the total population of France declared to be Catholic and 3.1% declared to be Protestant.

In 2016, Ipsos Global Trends, a multi-nation survey held by Ipsos and based on approximately 1,000 interviews, found that Christianity is the religion of 45% of the working-age, internet connected population of France; 42% stated they were Catholic, 2% stated that they were Protestants, and 1% declared to belong to any Orthodox church.

In 2015 the Eurobarometer, a survey funded by the European Union, found that Christianity was the religion of 54.3% of the French, with Catholicism being the main denomination with 47.8%.

== Denominations ==
=== Catholicism ===
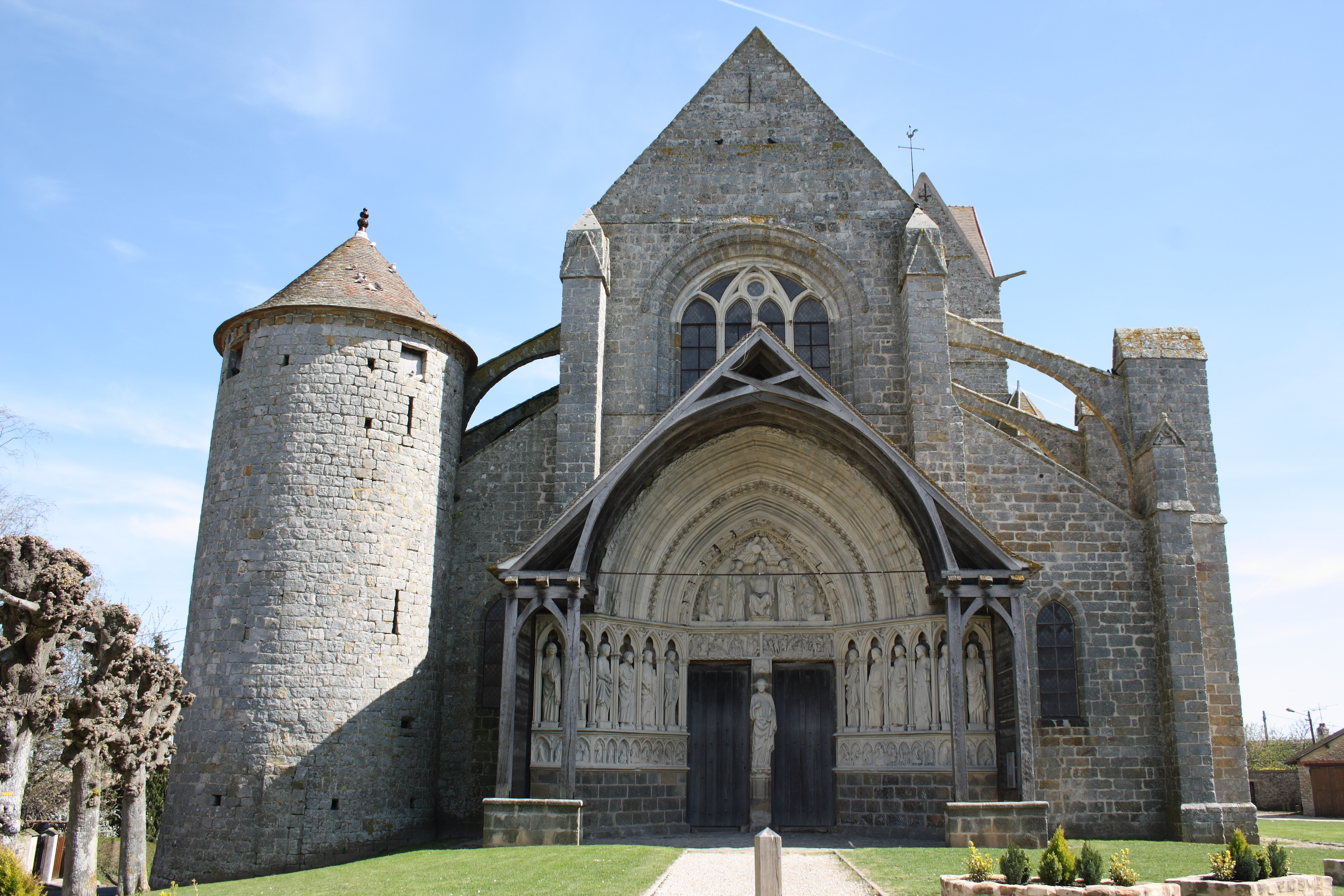
Saint Éliphe Church in Rampillon, Seine-et-Marne.

Early Christianity was already present among the Gauls by the 2nd century; Irenaeus, bishop of Lugdunum (Lyon), detailed the deaths of ninety-year-old bishop Pothinus and other martyrs during the persecution in Lyon which took place in 177. The Gaulish church was soon established in communion with the bishop of Rome. In 380, the emperor Theodosius I issued the Edict of Thessalonica, which made Christianity, specifically Nicene Christianity, the official religion of the Roman Empire. With the Migration Period of the Germanic peoples, the Gauls were invaded by the Franks, who at first practised Frankish paganism. Their tribes were unified into a kingdom, which came to be called France, by Clovis I. He was proclaimed the king of the Franks in 509, after having been baptised in 496 by Remigius, bishop of Reims. Catholicism was made the state religion of France. This made the Franks the only Germanic people who directly converted from their paganism to Catholicism without first embracing Arianism, which was the first religion of choice among Germanic peoples in the Migration Period.

In 800, Pope Leo III crowned Charlemagne as the emperor of the Holy Roman Empire, forming the unified political and religious foundation of Christendom, medieval European Christian civilisation, and establishing in earnest France's long historical association with the Catholic Church, for which it was known as the "eldest daughter of the church" throughout the Middle Ages. The French Revolution (1789–1799), which resulted in the establishment of the French First Republic (1792–1804), involved a heavy persecution of the Catholic Church, within a policy of dechristianisation, which led to the destruction of many churches, religious orders and artworks, including the very influential Cluny Abbey. During the First French Empire (1804–1814), the Bourbon Restoration (1814–1830) and the following July Monarchy (1830–1848), Roman Catholicism was made again the state religion, and maintained its role as the de facto majority religion during the Second French Republic (1848–1852) and the Second French Empire (1852–1870). Laïcité (secularism), absolute neutrality of the state with respect to religious doctrines, was first established during the Third French Republic (1870–1940), codified with the 1905 Law on the Separation of Church and State, and remains the official policy of the contemporary French republic.

In a 2016 study sponsored by two Catholic newspapers, the scholars Cleuziou and Cibois estimated that Catholics represented 53.8% of the French population. According to the same study, 23.5% were engaged Catholics and 17% were practising Catholics. The following year, in a survey focused on Protestantism, 57.5% of a sample of 31,155 people declared to be Catholic.

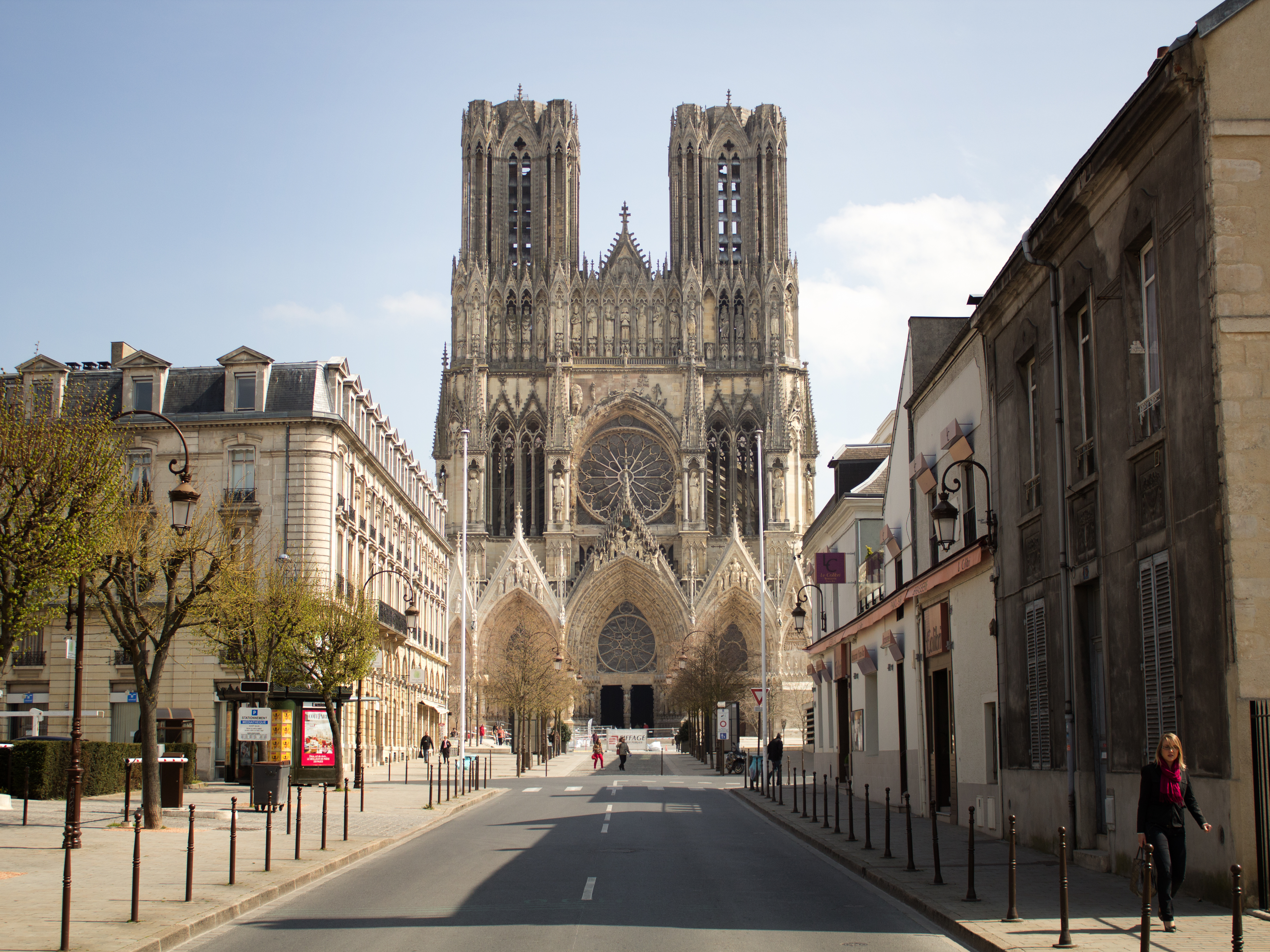
The Reims Cathedral, built on the site where Clovis I was baptised by Remigius, functioned as the site for the coronation of the Kings of France.

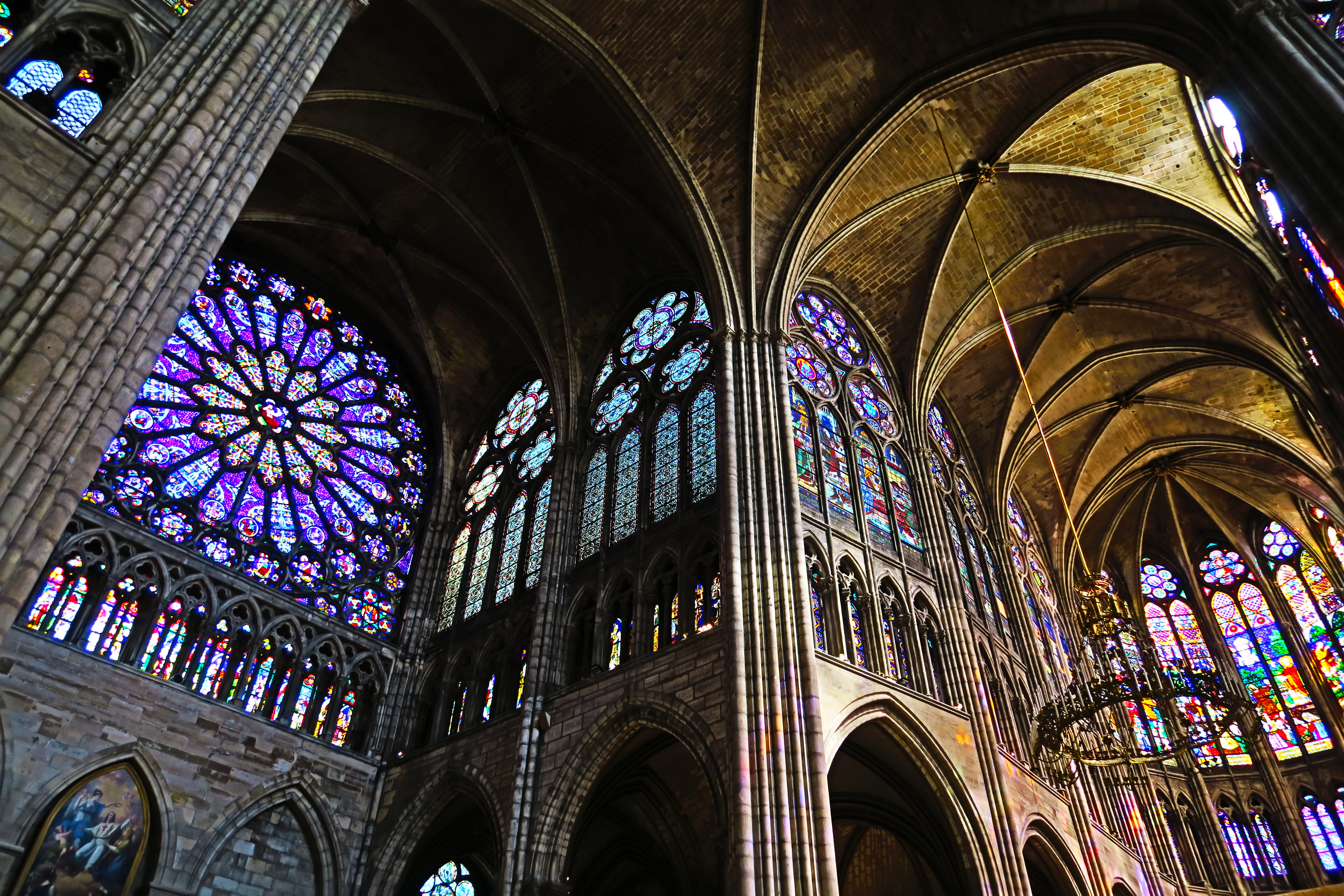
Interior of the Basilica of Saint Denis in Paris, prototype of Gothic architecture.

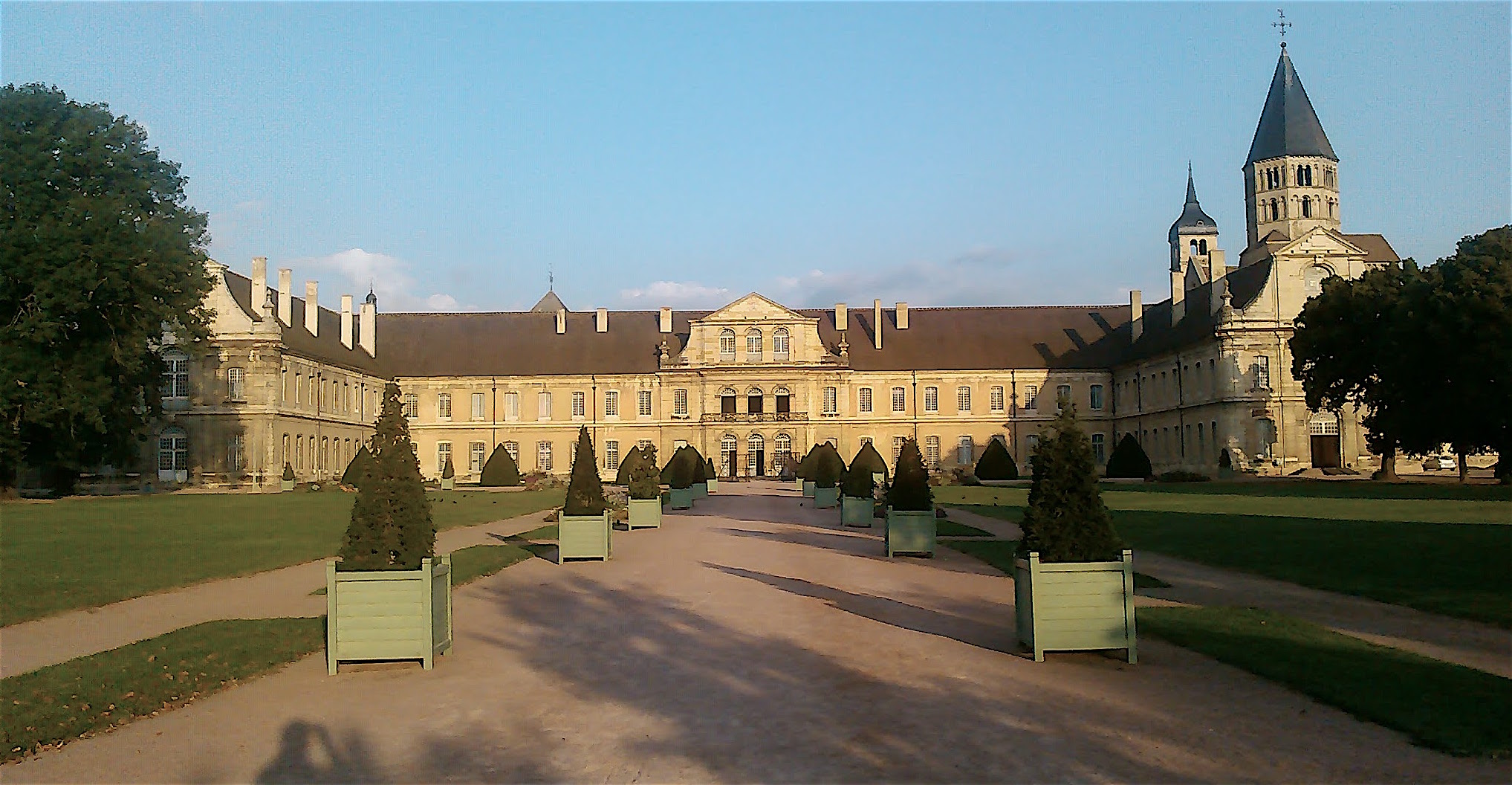
The Cluny Abbey in Saône-et-Loire, former centre of the Benedictine Order. During the French Revolution it was largely destroyed and only approximately one-tenth (the tower on the right) remains of the original building, which was the largest church building in medieval Europe, surpassed only by St. Peter's Basilica in the 17th century.

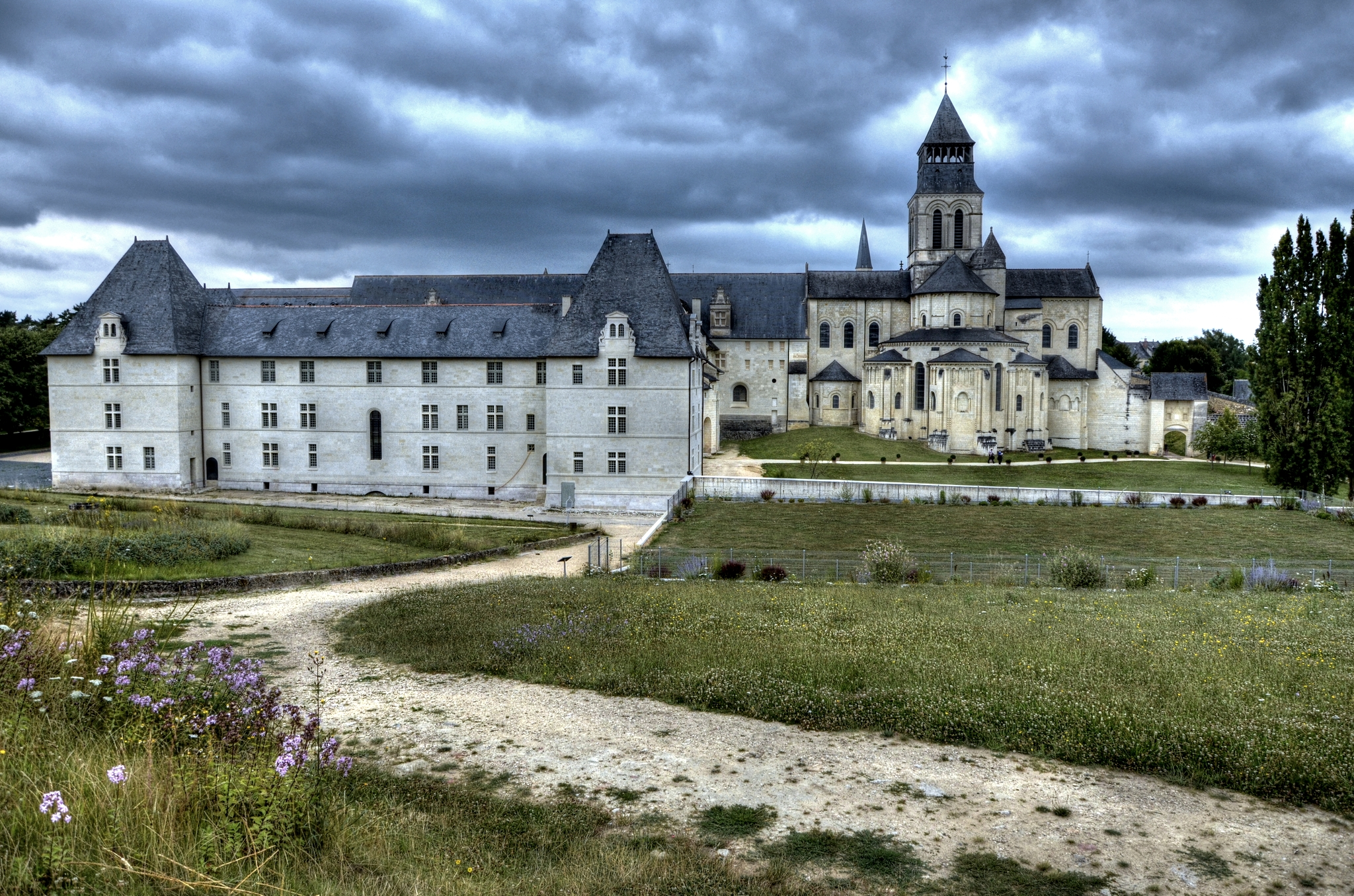
The former Royal Abbey of Our Lady of Fontevraud in Maine-et-Loire, now Centre Culturel de l'Ouest.

=== Protestantism ===
According to a survey by Ifop, in 2012, 770 people out of the 37,743 interviewed (or 2.1%) declared to be Protestants of various types. About 42% of them were Calvinists (Huguenots), 21% were evangelical Protestants, 17% were Lutherans and another 20% were affiliated with other Protestant churches. The percentage rose to 3.1% in 2017, mainly due to recent conversions. Out of 100% of people that have become Protestants, 67% were Catholic and 27% were of no religion.

In a study regarding the various religions of France, based on 49 surveys held by the Ifop in the period 2011–2014, so based on a sample of 51.770 interviewed, there were 17.4% of Protestants in the Bas-Rhin, 7.3% in the Haut-Rhin, 7.2% in the Gard, 6.8% in the Drôme and 4.2% in the Ardèche. In the other departments this presence is residual, with, for example, only 0.5% in Côte-d'Or and in the Côtes-d'Armor.

In recent years, a new Evangelical church is built every 10 days.

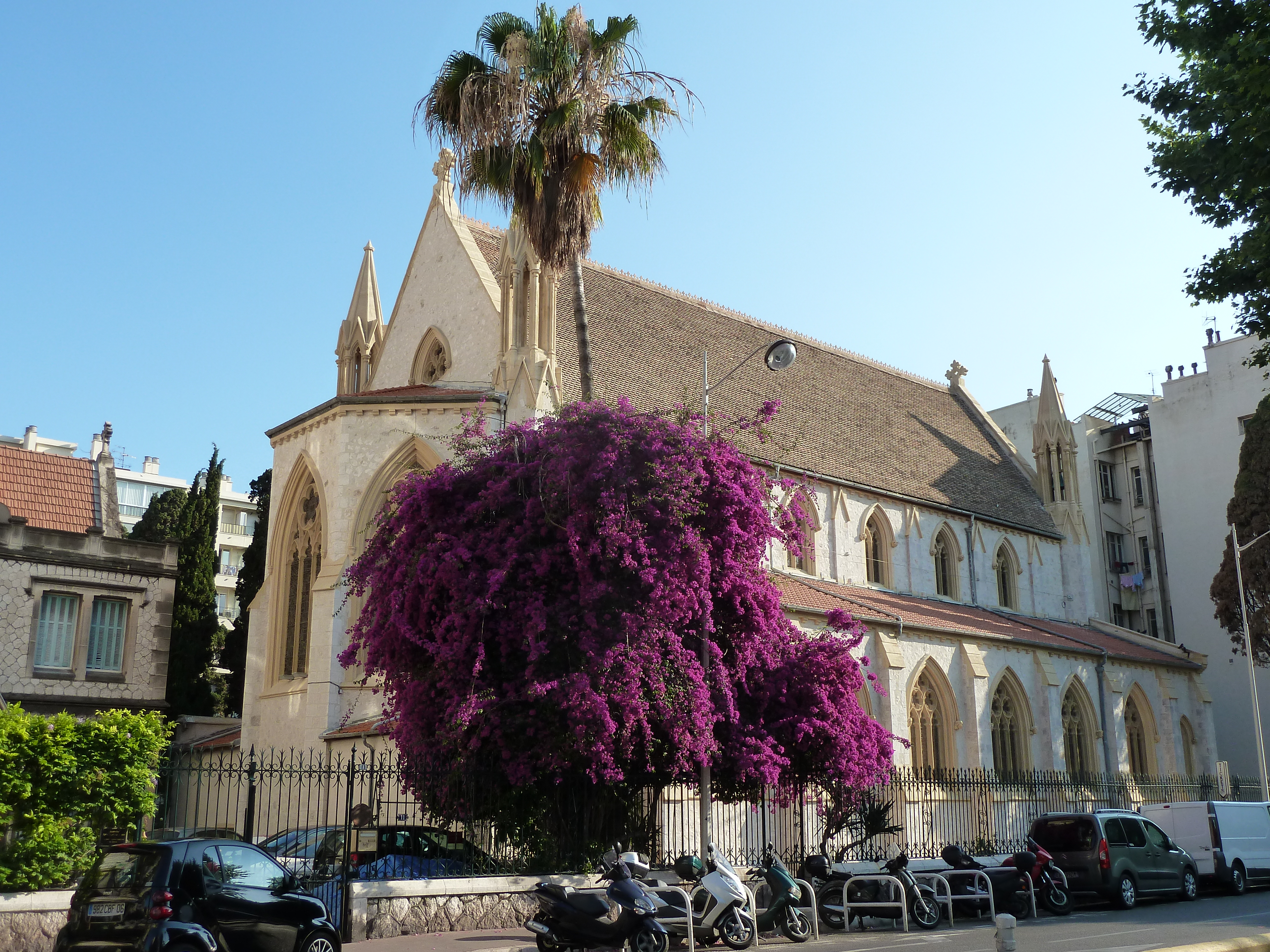
Anglican church in Nice, Alpes-Maritimes.

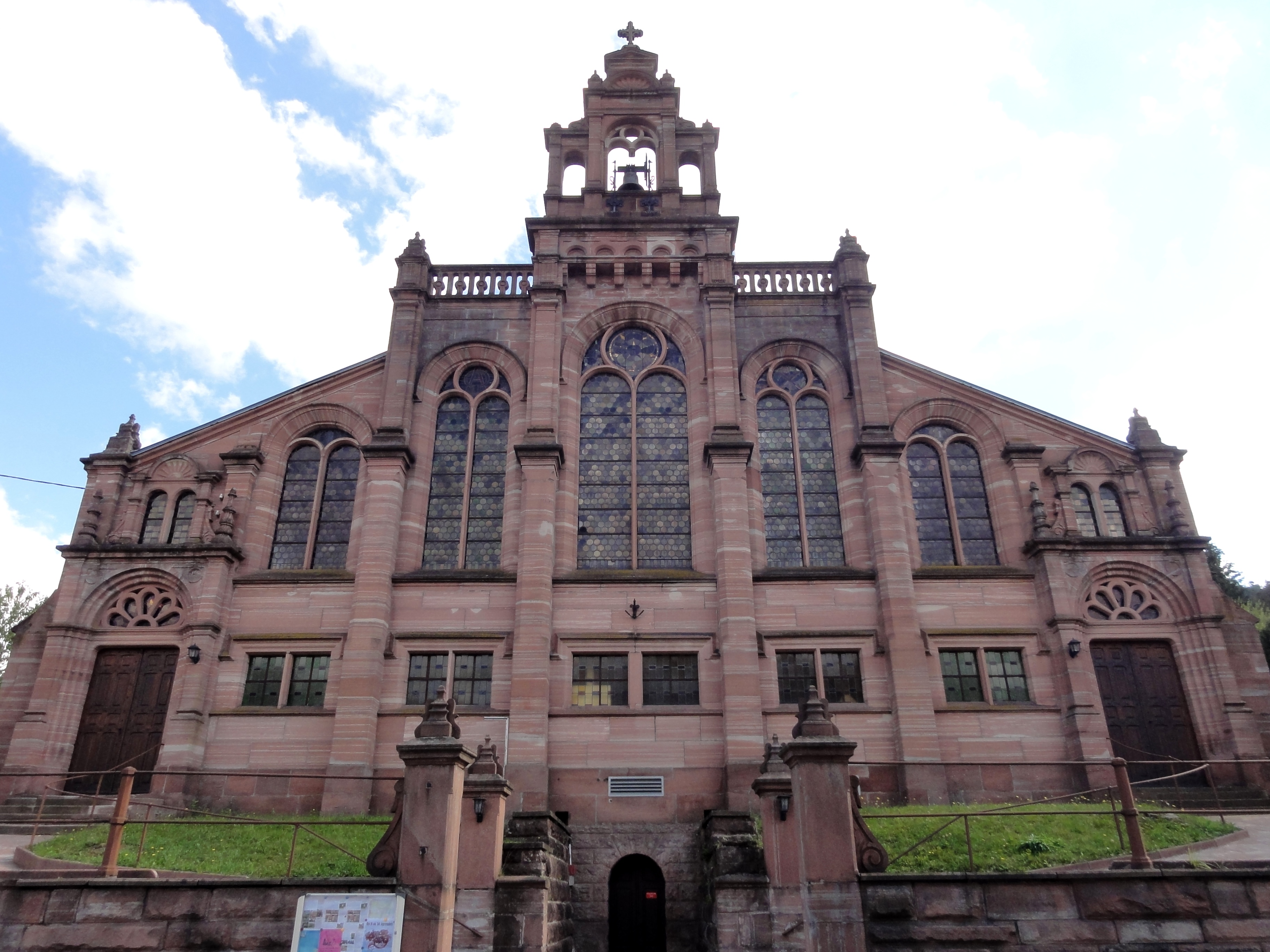
Lutheran church of Rothau, Bas-Rhin.

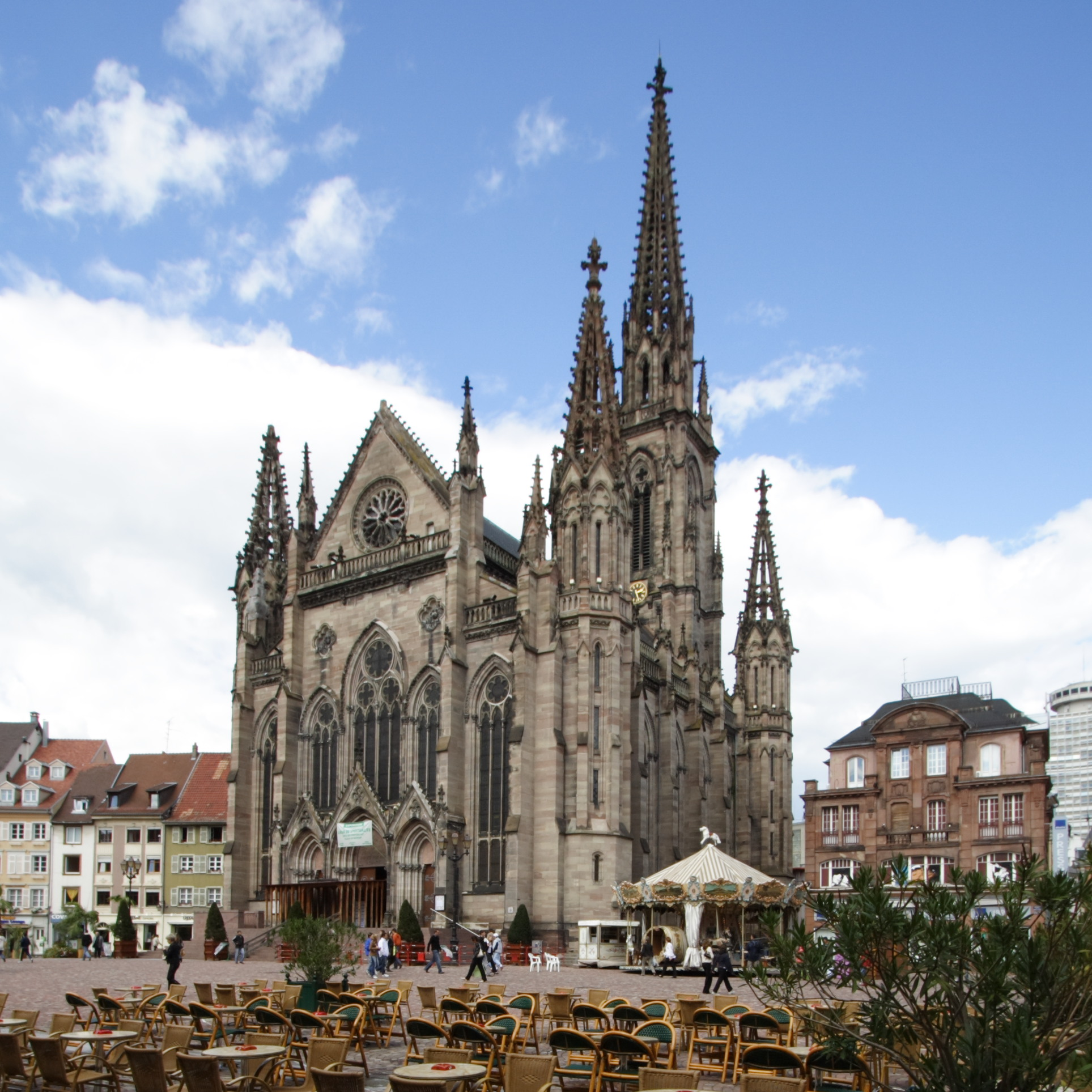
Calvinist Temple Saint-Étienne in Mulhouse, Haut-Rhin.

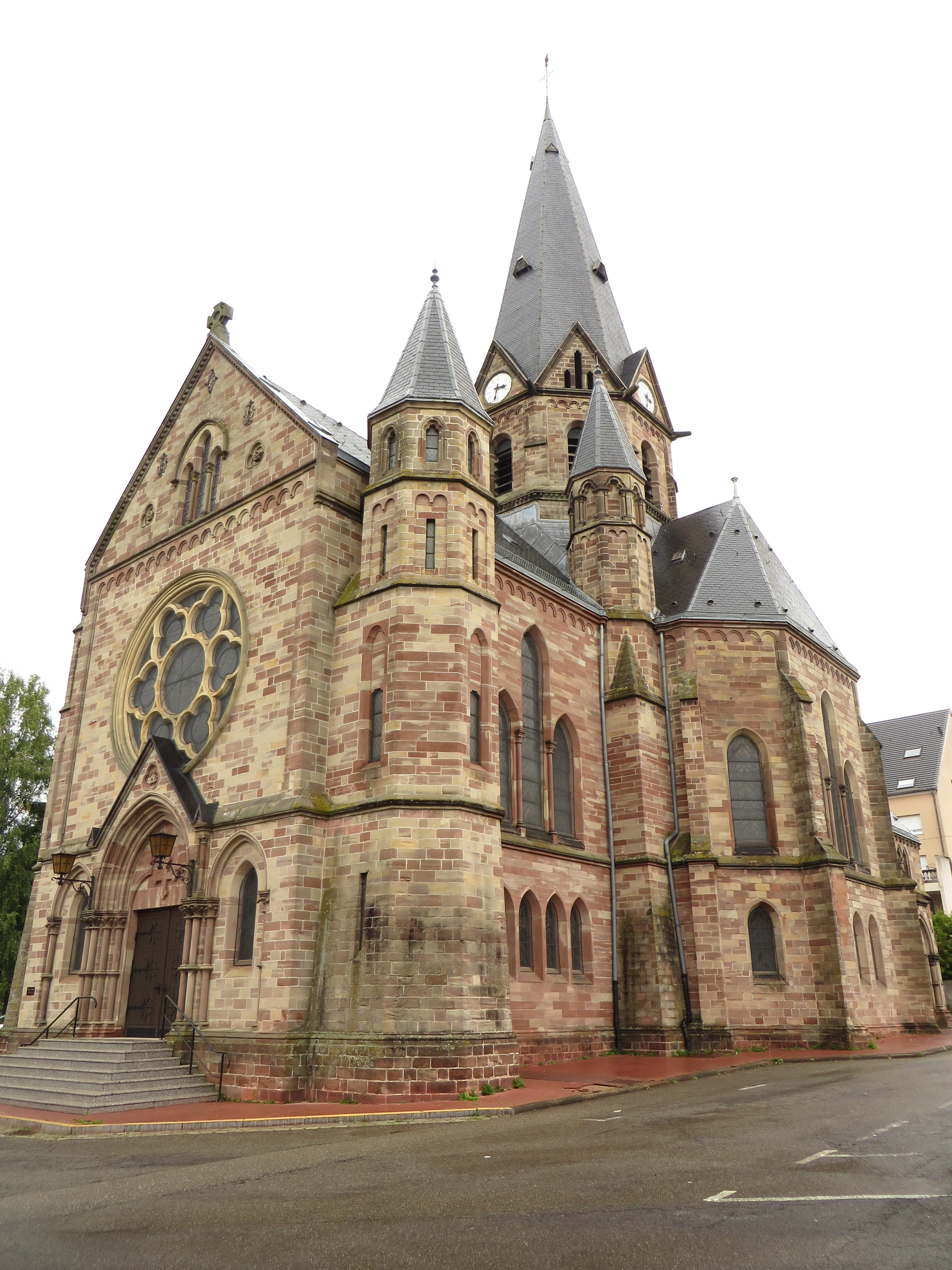
Lutheran church of Sarreguemines, Moselle.

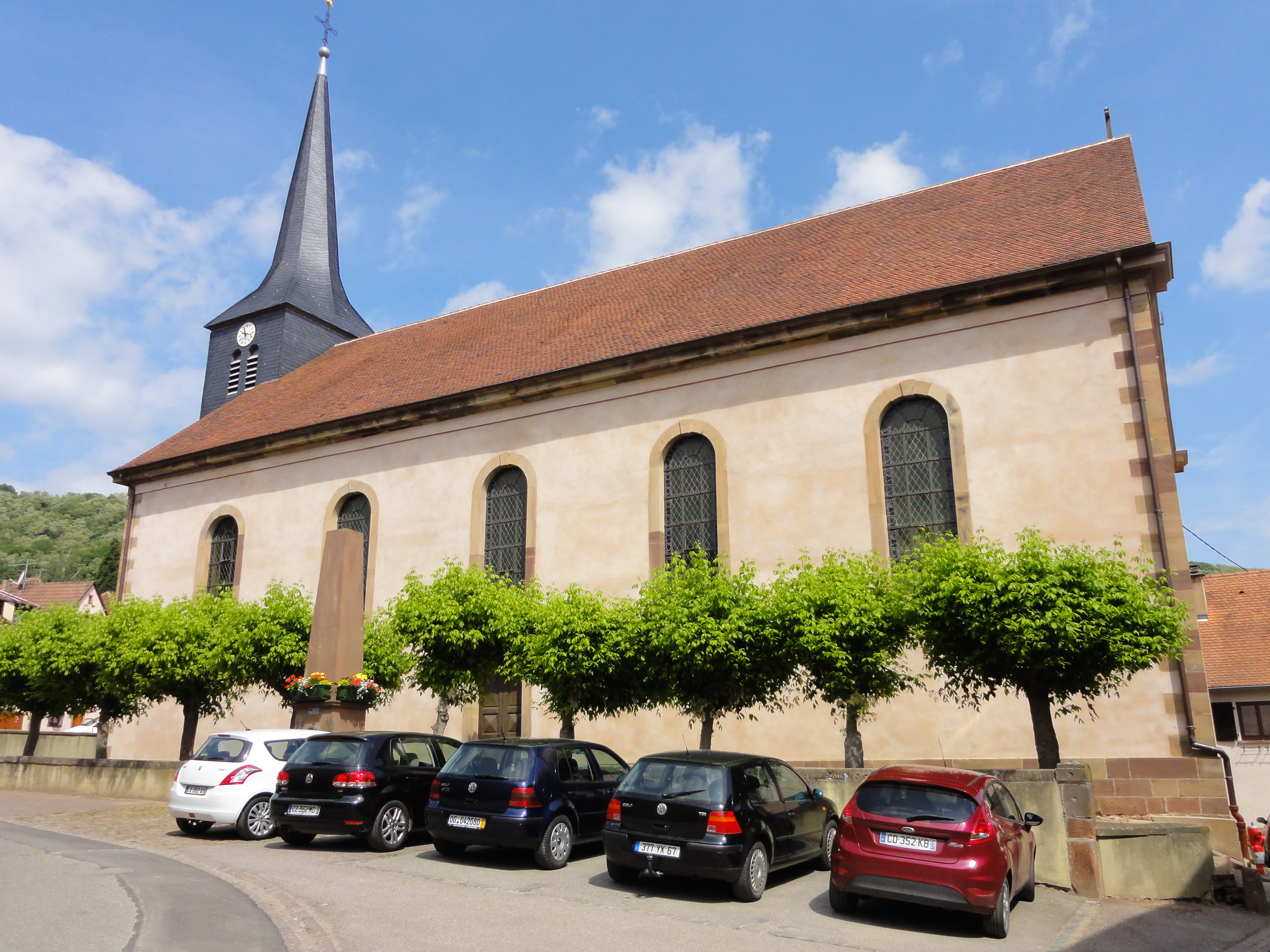
Lutheran church of Wangen, Bas-Rhin.

=== Eastern Orthodoxy ===
Domes of the Holy Trinity Cathedral of the Russian Orthodox Church in Paris.

The Eastern Orthodox Church in France is represented by several communities and ecclesiastical jurisdictions. Traditionally, Eastern Orthodox Christians in France are mainly ethnic Greeks, Russians, Romanians, Bulgarians, Serbs, Ukrainians and Georgians, but there are also some ethnic French converts to Eastern Orthodoxy. Different Eastern Orthodox churches have separate jurisdictions and organisations in France, the oldest among them being the Greek Orthodox Metropolis of France under the Ecumenical Patriarchate of Constantinople.

=== Oriental Orthodoxy ===
Oriental Orthodox Christianity in France is represented by several communities and ecclesiastical jurisdictions. Traditionally, Oriental Orthodox Christians in France are mainly ethnic Armenians, Copts, Ethiopians and Syriacs, but there are also French converts. The largest Oriental Orthodox church in France is the French Coptic Orthodox Church.

=== Other Christians ===
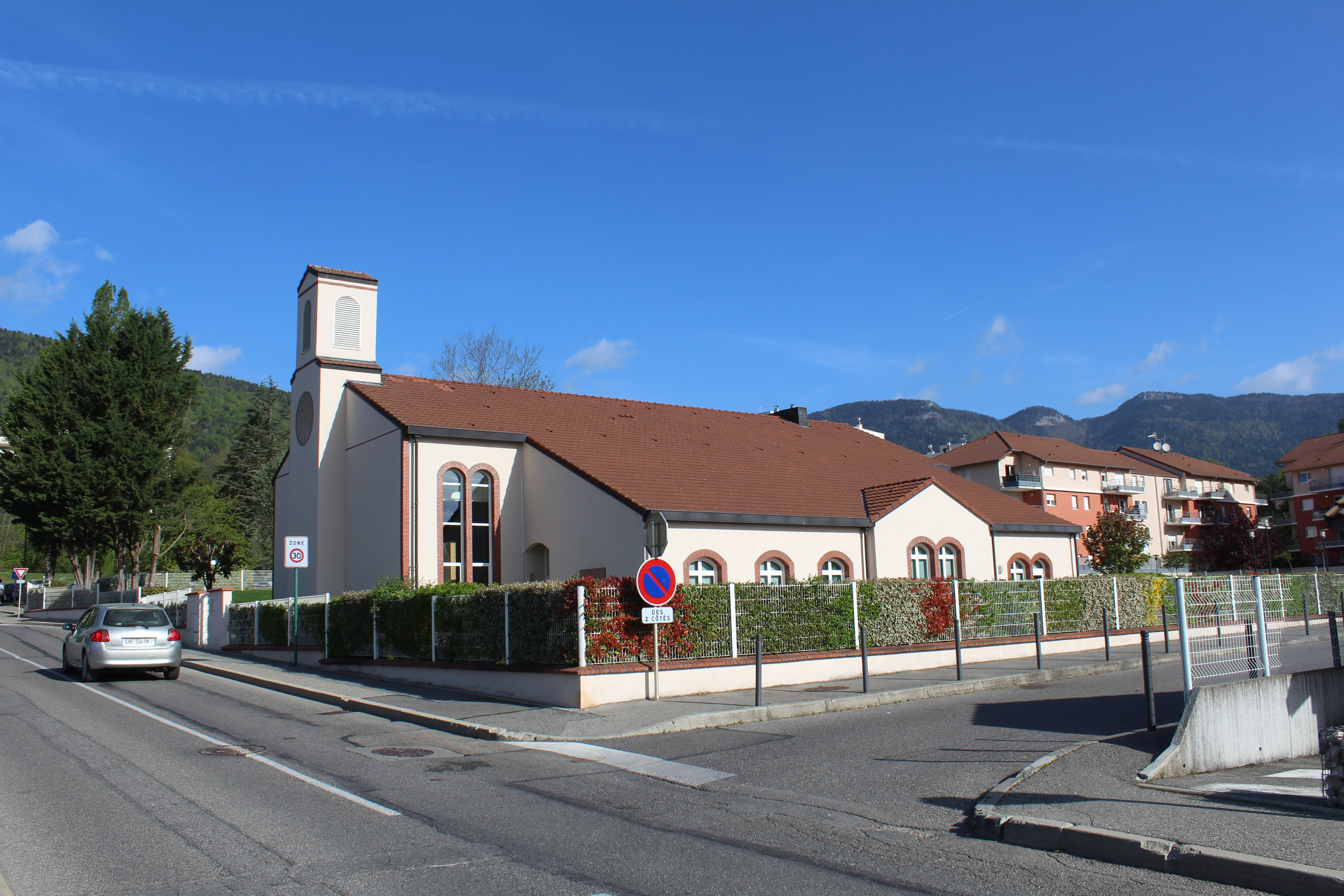
Mormon meetinghouse in Gex, Ain.

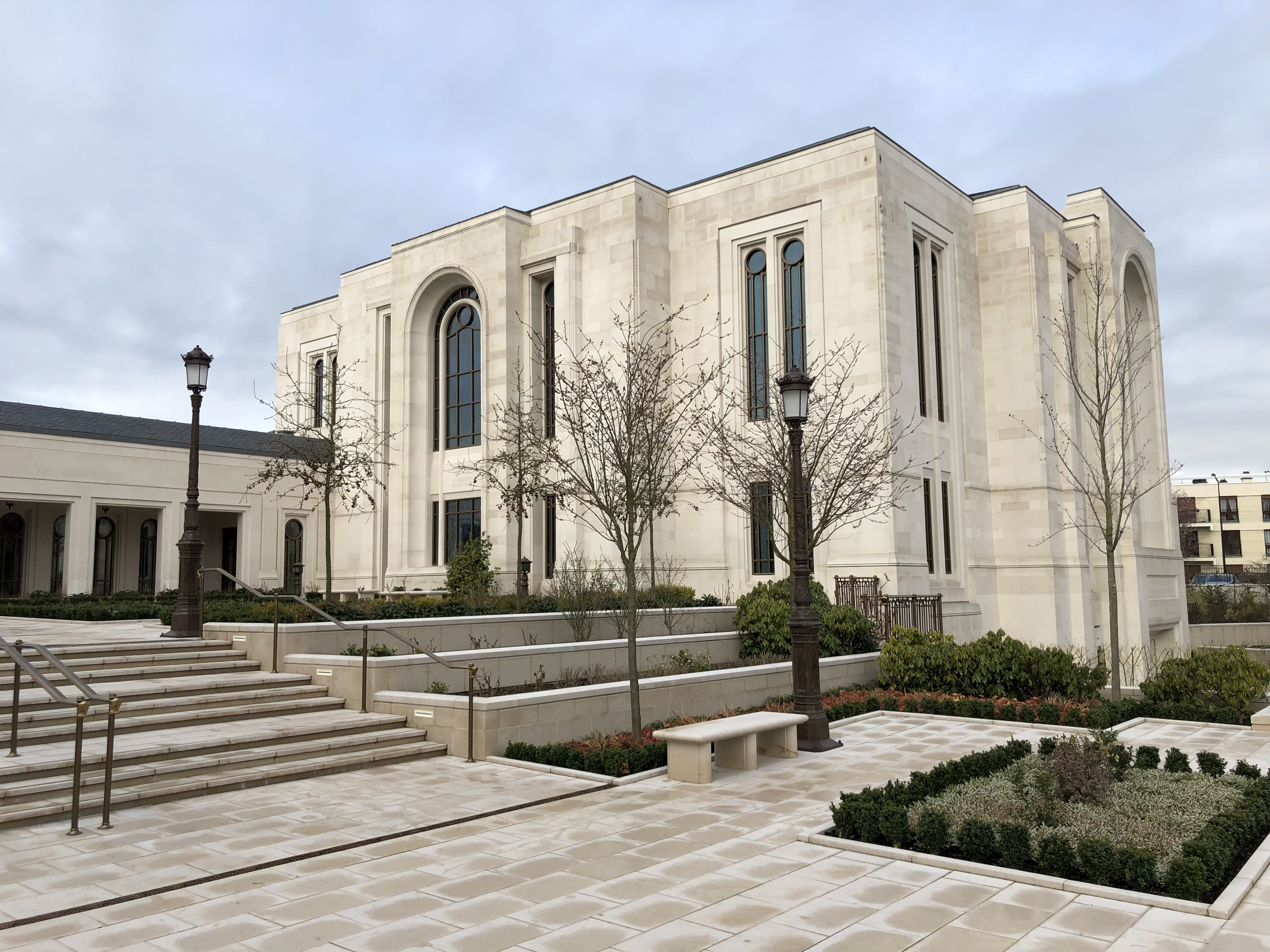
The courtyard of the Paris France Temple

Other Christian groups in France include the Jehovah's Witnesses, the Church of Jesus Christ of Latter-day Saints, and other small sects. The European Court on Human Rights reckoned 249,918 "regular and occasional" Jehovah's Witnesses in France and according to their official website, there are 128,759 publishers in the country.

== Taizé community ==
France is home to the Taizé Community, an ecumenical Christian monastic fraternity in Taizé, Saône-et-Loire, Burgundy. With a focus on youth, it has become one of the world's most important sites of Christian pilgrimage with over 100,000 young people from around the world converging each year for prayer, Bible study, sharing, and communal work.

== See also ==
- Religion in France
- 1905 French law on the Separation of the Churches and the State
- Freedom of religion in France
