= Aleksandar Protić =

Popular Fashion designer in Portugal

- Occupation: Fashion designer
- Known for: Fluid form and draping of pieces.
- Website: http://aleksandarprotic.eu/

Aleksandar Protić (Serbian Cyrillic: Александар Протић; also known as Alexander Protić) is a Serbian-born fashion designer. His pieces are known for their casual and fluid forms, as well as their draping. He also designs costumes for dance and theater companies.

== Career ==
Born in Belgrade, Protić graduated from the city's Academy of Fine Arts in 1998. He then studied fashion design at the Royal Academy of Fine Arts in Antwerp, Belgium, before moving to Portugal in 1999. One year later, he founded his namesake label in the Lisbon neighborhood of Bairro Alto.

After two decades of work, he is considered to be one of Serbia's, and also Portugal's, top designers. Often using natural fibers like silk or wool, Protić specializes in creating a draping effect with the fabrics. He is a regular at Belgrade Fashion Week, where he has won several awards, and at Portugal's Moda Lisboa, also known as Lisbon Fashion Week. In 2012, he partnered with the Dkode shoe company for his show in Lisbon. The following year, his designs relied on a monochromatic palette. His 2014 collection at Moda Lisboa was described as sensuous and embodying Japanese Manga heroines. In 2016, he had a runway show which was inspired by the paintings of Georgia O'Keeffe. In 2017, Protic's collection paid homage to British sculptor Barbara Hepworth, with his focus on ladylike elegance being described as "...refreshing and sincere, underlining his experienced hand." In 2018, he presented an all-black collection, inspired by the silent screen actress Theda Bara and featured on the opening day of Moda Lisboa.

Representing Portugal in 2010, Protić was one of the winners at Maison Mode Méditerranée, a fashion event held for European coastal countries. He also represented Portugal at the cultural event Marseille-Provence 2013

His designs have appeared in Portuguese Vogue, Portuguese Elle Magazine, Serbian Elle Magazine, Italian Grazia magazine and Italian Vogue, as well as Belgrade Fashion Week's 2016 magazine "BfW Iconic Designers", for contributing to the development of fashion design in Serbia.

Protić also works as a costume designer for dance and theater groups. He has created costumes for shows seen at France's Opera de Lyon, Lisbon's Teatro Camões and Teatro Maria Matos, and for Portugal's National Ballet Company. He designed the costumes for choreographer Tania Carvalho's dance film "A Bag and a Stone".

As for his influences, Protić has stated that although he targets an international audience, his Serbian background has contributed to his style: "Of course, my roots and origins in Serbia and the time in Antwerp influenced me! At the time, I did not design the same as I do now...But in the end, as a designer, you always try to design something for the whole world."
