= Saint Sava Serbian Orthodox Church (Gaborone) =

- Saint Sava Serbian Orthodox Church
- 24°33′12″S 25°59′17″E
- Location: Gaborone, South-East District
- Country: Botswana
- Denomination: Serbian Orthodox Church

History
- Status: Church
- Dedication: Saint Sava

Architecture
- Functional status: Active
- Years built: 2015-2021

The Saint Sava Serbian Orthodox Church (Serbian: Српска православна црква Светог Саве, romanized: Srpska pravoslavna crkva Svetog Save) is a Serbian Orthodox Church in Gaborone, capital of Botswana. Began by the Serbian diaspora in 2015, it is the second Serbian Orthodox church in Africa, following the one in Johannesburg, South Africa. The Church of Saint Sava is one of the tallest buildings in Gaborone, contrasting with the city’s traditionally low-rise architecture. The interior was decorated by Vladimir Skerlić, a Serbian mosaic and fresco artist from Belgrade. Architecturally, it resembles Serbian churches from the late 19th and early 20th century.

== History ==
Serbs began migrating to Botswana in the 1970s, facilitated by a visa-free regime for Yugoslav citizens. The Serbian community in Botswana, consisting of about 30 families, has been organized within the Serbian Society since 2011.

The project was initiated by the Serbi community, predominantly comprising families who immigrated during the 1990s due to Yugoslav Wars. The land was donated by Milivoje Nikolić, a Serb entrepreneur, and construction received support from various local and international donors, including contributions from Greece, China, and the United States. The church, consecrated by Irinej, Serbian Patriarch in 2018. The church was completed in 2021.

== See also ==
- Serbs in South Africa
