= Delije =

Name for supporters of a Serbian sports organization

- Делије Север / Delije Sever (Delije North)
- Abbreviation: DS89
- Founded: 7 January 1989 (officially)
- Type: Supporters' groups Ultras group
- Team: Red Star Belgrade
- Headquarters: Belgrade, Serbia
- Arenas: Rajko Mitić Stadium; Aleksandar Nikolić Hall; Belgrade Arena
- Stand: North
- Coordinates: 44°46′59.52″N 20°27′53.69″E
- Colors: red, white
- Affiliations: Gate 7 (Olympiacos CFP); Fratria (FC Spartak Moscow)

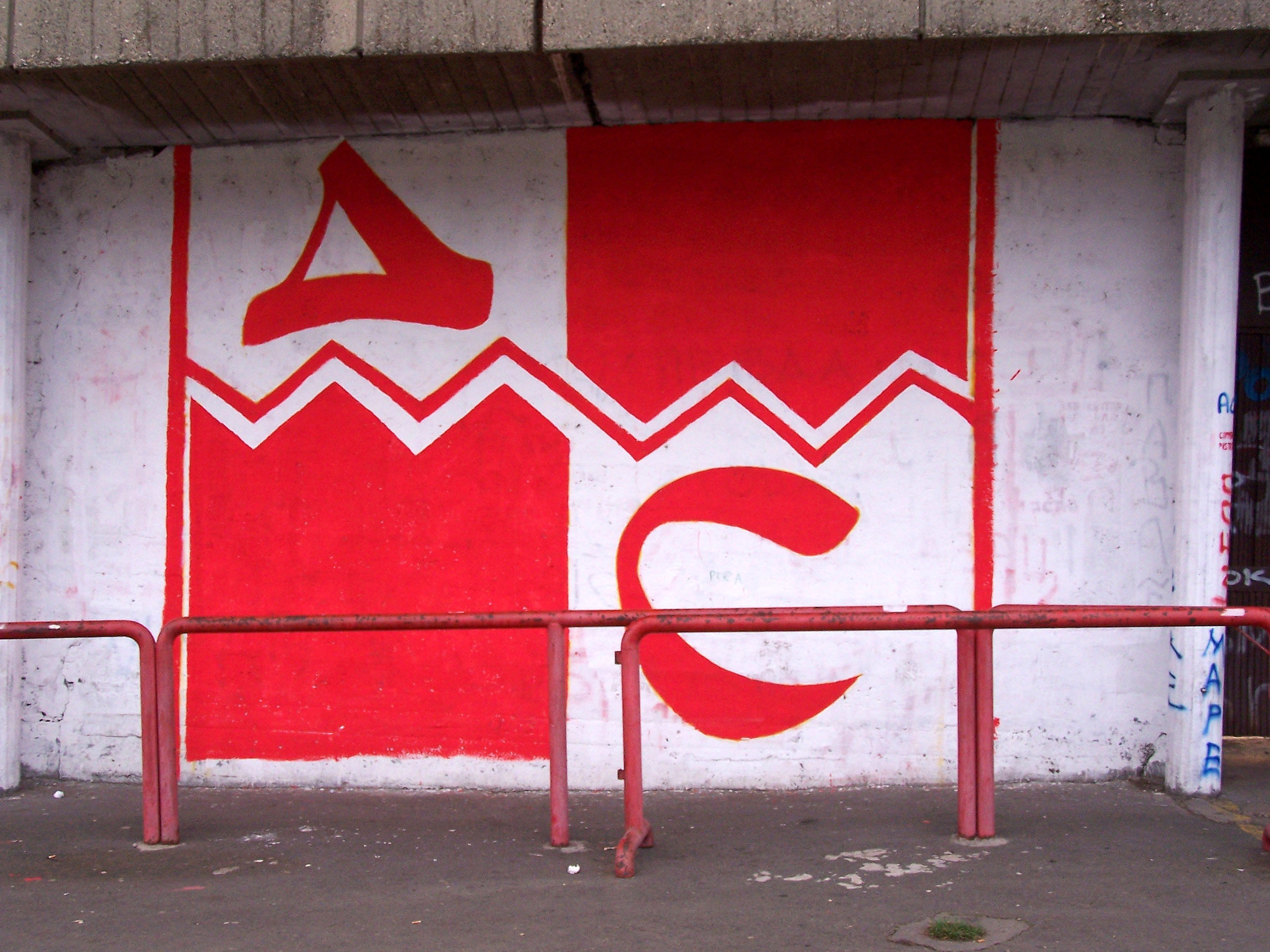
Delije Sever mural at the Rajko Mitić Stadium

Delije (Serbian Cyrillic: Делије) is collective name for supporters of various sports clubs that are part of Red Star Belgrade multi-sport club. The plural of the singular form delija (делија)—which in Serbian generally signifies a courageous, brave, strong, tough, or even handsome young man—a rough English translation of Delije is "Heroes", "Braves", or "Studs".

Red Star multi-sport club has clubs in over twenty sports, although Delije mostly focus on football (FK Crvena zvezda) and basketball (KK Crvena zvezda). The name Delije first began to be used by hardcore Red Star supporters during the late 1980s, with official inauguration taking place on 7 January 1989. Up to that point, the die-hard fans were scattered amongst about eight groups that shared the north stand at the Rajko Mitić Stadium (known colloquially as Marakana), most prominent of which were the Red Devils, Ultras and Zulu Warriors.

As a sign of appreciation, during the late 1990s, Red Star painted the word Delije in block letters across the north stand. Since the mid-1980s the supporters maintain friendly relations with Olympiacos main ultras group, Gate 7, a friendship based on traditional Greek-Serb friendship, common Eastern Orthodox faith and same club colours. Since the mid-2000s the brotherhood has evolved to include Spartak Moscow ultras Fratria, owing to strong Russophilia and a shared Slavic heritage.

== History ==
=== 1940s ===
Since the very founding of Red Star Belgrade, there was a section of members-friends of the Sports Club Red Star, which had about 100 faithful supporters encouraging the red-whites which started to follow the club on all away matches in the newly formed Yugoslav First League. The section was mostly made of young men from the affluent parts of the Belgrade—Senjak, Topčidersko Brdo, Dedinje, Knez Mihailova Street, but amongst the first Red Star supporters there were also children of workers, which would eventually form the "first team" of supporters and leaders in the future.

=== 1950s ===
During the 1950s, a separation between spectators and pure supporters finally became evident, mostly because supporters began to bring rattles, bells and a few flags to the stadium. With the arrival of Dragoslav Šekularac to Red Star many things changed. The fans saw their reflection on the field, because Šekularac had class as well as talent. Supporters especially appreciated Šeki's battling spirit, which was a magnet for new red-white fans young and old.

=== 1980s ===
In the 1980s the North side was split between two big supporters groups, the "Ultras" and the "Red Devils". The Ultras followed Italian influence which consisted of long and melodic songs, fireworks, and choreography. The Red Devils based their group on Serbian habits, which were often mixed with English habits such as heavy drinking, and constantly fighting rivals. These two groups regularly caused unrest, which brought them into conflict with the communist police. Because of many incidents people belonging to these two groups were regularly arrested.

During the mid-1980s, Ultras and Red Devils were strengthened by a new group, the "Zulu Warriors". These three groups became the body of the North Stand. However, there were also many other groups with much less influence, such as Winners, Red and White Angels, Brigate, Red Star Army, Red Star Clan, and the Eagles.

The late 1980s came with strong nationalism, and Red Star supporters, in the spirit of their tradition declared themselves as Serbian nationalists. They would often chant Serbian patriotic songs, and carry Serbian flags. At the moment when politics was already deeply inside stadiums a big meeting of all North groups was held with only one goal that no other names except Red Star, Belgrade and Serbia should be spoken at the games. That rule is obligated to be followed even today, although fans use every opportunity to express their political opinion.

Soon afterward fans got their own room for meetings, and membership cards were also made. This is when most of these groups joined together. In 1989 the Delije were formed and they stated that the intent of the group was to be a modern European group, which became true in a very short while.

=== 1990s ===
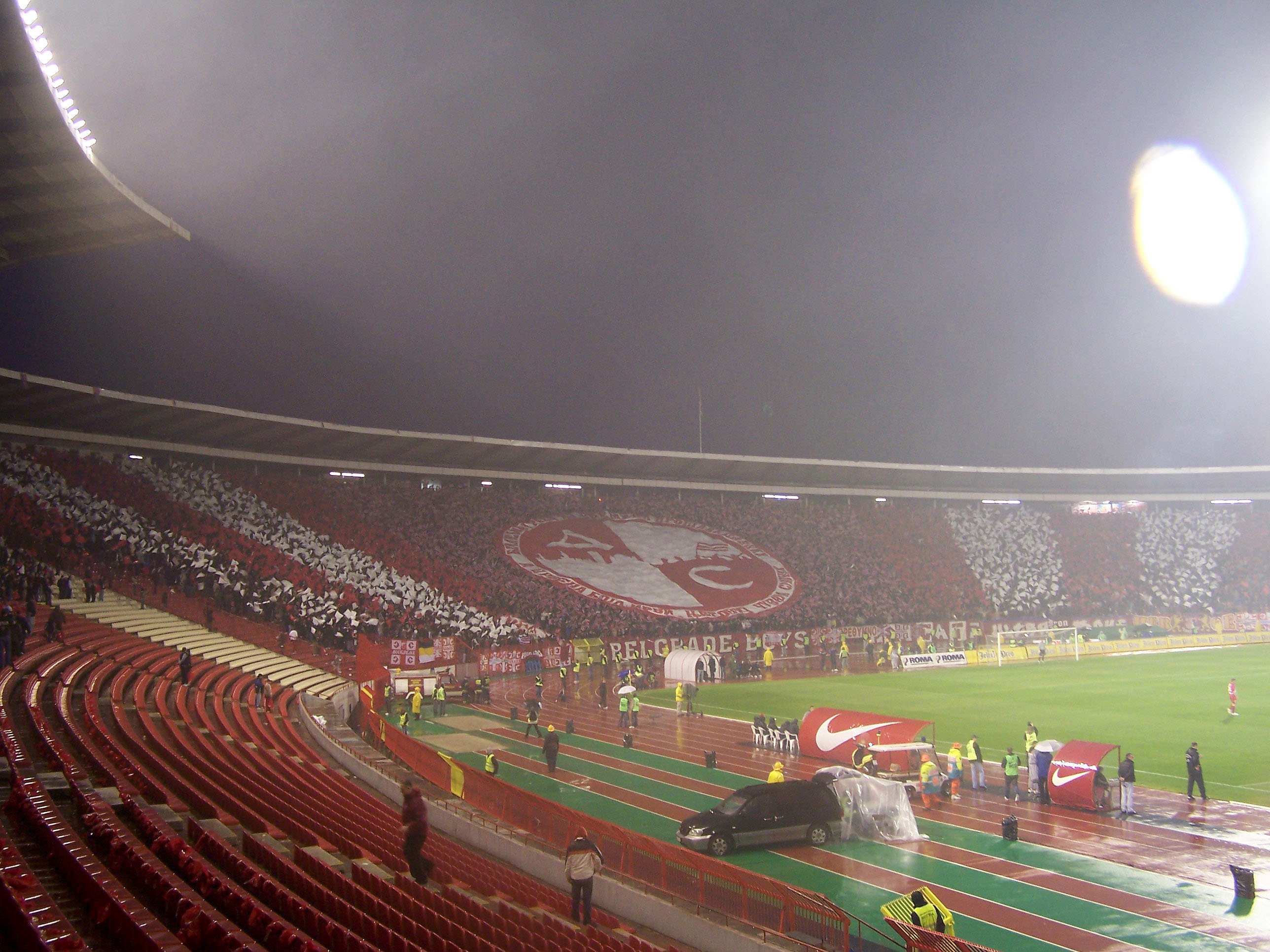
Delije Sever during the 137th Eternal Derby (Belgrade Derby) in November 2009.

During the 1990s the best and the worst came to Red Star and Delije. Yugoslavia slowly deteriorated, nationalism had taken over across the whole of the Balkans, and a war was proclaimed unavoidable by many. On May 13, 1990 an estimated 3,000 of the Delije traveled to Zagreb's Maksimir to see Red Star take on Dinamo Zagreb. Always an intense rivalry, the fact that this particular match took place just weeks after Croatia had held its first multi-party elections in about 50 years (which, incidentally, was won by the parties favouring Croatian independence) only served to increase the tension between the two. The ensuing riot was one of the most violent events in sports history, and many believe that the riot was the first sign of the war to come. It has served as a prime example of what politics can do when mixed with sport.

The Delije however would shortly be rewarded with the best Yugoslav football team ever assembled. During their run in the 1990–91 European Cup the Delije followed Red Star wherever they played. They traveled all over Europe, defeating Grasshopper Zürich, Glasgow Rangers, Dynamo Dresden and German giants Bayern Munich along the way to Bari (the host of the final), where they faced Marseille. The 1991 Red Star team gave the fans something that many Delije could only have dreamt about until then; the European Cup trophy, defeating the French side 5–3 on penalties, with Prosinečki, Binić, Belodedić, Mihajlović and Pančev scoring. This same team even went on to become world champions, by defeating Colo-Colo of Chile 3–0 in the Intercontinental Cup.

In 1990, members of the Delije provided the base for the Serb Volunteer Guard, a paramilitary unit commanded by the director of the Delije, Željko "Arkan" Ražnatović. The Delije-based Guard, nicknamed "Arkan's Tigers", participated in the Yugoslav wars of the 1990s. Arkan's Tigers made a dramatic appearance on the north stand during the Belgrade Derby game of 22 March 1992, played between Red Star and Partizan, where they held up actual highway marker signs displaying: '20 miles to Vukovar'; '10 miles to Vukovar'; 'Welcome to Vukovar'.

Vojislav Šešelj in his Hague trial said:

In 1990, all the supporters of the football club Red Star joined the Serbian Chetnik movement, and at some point in October 1990, through mediators, Arkan requested to meet me. I said, "We can do that at the Ruski Tsar restaurant." I didn't want to go to any secret place where someone could kill me so easily. Arkan came with another man who was as tall as me but much stronger. It was Suca [Nebojša Đorđević] who was our member but then joined Arkan's group, and he was a colonel in Arkan's Serb Volunteer Guard. Arkan was very polite at the beginning of the conversation. He told me, "I respect you as a man and as a politician. I'm not interested in politics, but I won't let anyone take over Zvezda and Delije." Those were the supporters, the fan club of the football club Red Star. "And I'm asking you to leave the Delije be." But I told him, "They have joined the Serbian Chetnik movement. They stay there. You cannot change it." And then he said, "Look, I have killed many people. You haven't killed anyone yet. So take care what you do." I quipped by saying that it was true that I hadn't killed anyone yet, "But you would be the first," I told him.

Šešelj further claimed:

Nebojša [Đorđević], Suca, was one of the principal leaders of Red Star fans. He joined the Chetnik movement in the summer of 1990. When I conflicted with Arkan, he moved under Arkan's reign. Let me just say that in October 1990, I was arrested and spent 23 days in jail, and then Arkan managed to snatch the Delije from me. Perhaps in cahoots with somebody from the regime, he bribed them by giving them jobs and paying them for those jobs. That's how he managed to win almost all of them over, including Suca. This Nebojša, Suca, later became a colonel in Arkan's volunteer guards. Arkan himself bestowed the rank upon him. And even later than that, he was killed in a showdown and that murder was never solved.

After the Kosovo war and the NATO bombings of Serbia crippled the economy and ruined sport in the country. The league is now considered poor at best. The Delije can still be seen in action when Red Star is competing in a European tournament or when they lock horns with Partizan. After a long series of struggles and armed conflicts in Bosnia and Croatia, which took five years in all, Red Star was allowed to take part in a first European competition after five years of ban in European cups. The first international game after the war ended was a friendly match with Olympiacos (4–1) at Marakana. A large flag with "Welcome Orthodox Brothers" was set along the east stand as a welcome gesture to Greek fans and players. Today there is a solid friendship between the two supporting groups, and they have an ultra-union group, Orthodox Brothers. FC Spartak Moscow fans also joined the group, so seeing fans of all the three clubs at one stand supporting the same team—especially at away European matches.

== Structure ==
Delije organizational structure is fairly decentralized with many subgroups present at the stadium's north stand, the gathering point of the club's core supporter base. At any given time, one or two subgroups emerge as the most prominent through dedication, regular attendance, and commitment, as a result get to hang their banners on the most visible parts of the stand and their leaders get to lead the chants. Currently, the subgroup Belgrade Boys (known by the acronym BBRS) holds the most influence, while other Belgrade subgroups such as Ultra Boys, Brigate and Heroes, also wield a lot of influence. Since Red Star enjoys a lot of support outside of Belgrade as well, various organized groups exist in cities across Serbia, Montenegro, and Bosnia and Hercegovina as well as in Serb diaspora. The most organized and numerous of those include Nišlije (Niš), NSCZ (Novi Sad), Kopre Nedri (grouping of various subgroups from Republika Srpska), CGCZ (grouping of various subgroups from Montenegro), Čačani (Čačak), Delije Šabac (Šabac), Armija 5 (grouping of various subgroups from Smederevo, Požarevac and several neighbouring towns), Delije Petrovgrad (Zrenjanin), Delije Kruševac (Kruševac), Delije Valjevo (Valjevo), Delije Kumanovo (Kumanovo in North Macedonia), Orthodox Boys (Slovenia), Ultra klan (grouping of various subgroups from Serb diaspora), Delije Ontario (from Ontario, Canada).

== Notable leaders ==
- Branimir Zeljković, known as "Zelja"
- Željko Ražnatović, known as "Arkan"
- Zoran Timić, known as "Tima"
- Nebojša Đorđević, known as "Šuca"
- Velibor Dunjić, known as "Velja"
- Vladimir Šavija
- Marko Vučković, known as "Komandant"
- Predrag Panić, known as "Peđa"
