= Serbs in Malta =

Serbi f'Malta Срби на Малти Srbi na Malti

Total population
- 5,935 (2021)

Regions with significant populations
- Valletta

Languages
- Serbian and Maltese

Religion
- Eastern Orthodoxy

Serbs in Malta are Maltese citizens of ethnic Serb ancestry and/or Serbia-born persons living in Malta. According to the 2021 census, there were 5,935 Serbia-born people living in Malta, forming the fifth-largest foreign-born group in the country.

== History ==
Serb immigration to Malta steadily increased throughout the 2010s, driven by Malta's European Union membership expansion, economic opportunities in tourism and construction, and Malta's appeal as a Mediterranean hub. In 2019, 22 Serbian children faced deportation risks due to parents' income thresholds under Malta's tightened immigration rules, prompting diplomatic intervention from Serbia and a Maltese fundraising campaign that raised over €20,000.

== See also ==
- Immigration to Malta
- Serb diaspora
- Malta–Serbia relations
