= Fratria =

Russian football supporter organization

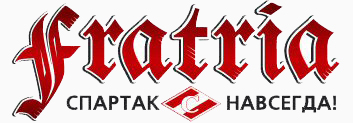
- Fratria's logo
- Nickname: Fratria
- Abbreviation: F05
- Established: 2005
- Type: Supporters' group Ultras group
- Team: FC Spartak Moscow
- Motto: One for all and all for one
- Location: Moscow, Russia
- Arena: Otkritie Arena, Luzhniki Stadium
- Colors: Red, white
- Affiliations: Delije (Red Star Belgrade); Gate 7 (Olympiacos)

Fratria (Russian: Фратрия, means "brotherhood" in Latin) is the largest organisation of FC Spartak Moscow supporters. It is responsible for organized voice and banner support during Spartak's matches both home (stand "B" of Luzhniki Stadium) and away.

The group was founded in 2005. Its motto is One for all and all for one.

They maintain friendly relations with Delije, ultras and supporters of Serbian club Red Star Belgrade and Gate 7, the ultras of Greek club Olympiacos. The friendship between the groups stems from their links to the Orthodox faith and having the same club colours. The friendship is known as the Orthodox brotherhood.
