= Gate 7 (supporter group) =

Fan club of Olympiacos CFP, in Greece

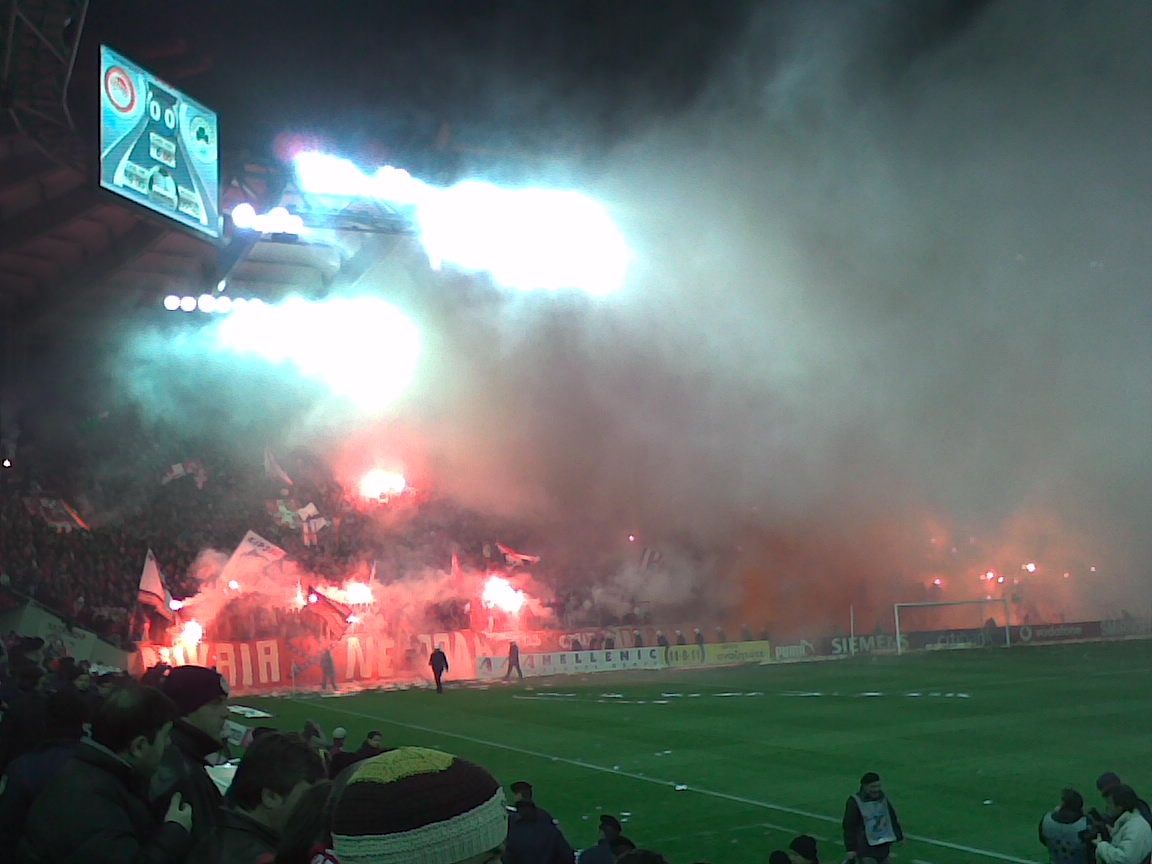
- Founded: 1980–present
- Type: Supporters' group Ultras group
- Club: Olympiacos CFP
- Location: Piraeus, Greece
- Arena: Georgios Karaiskakis Stadium; Peace and Friendship Stadium
- Colors: red, white
- Affiliations: Delije (Red Star Belgrade); Fratria (FC Spartak Moscow)

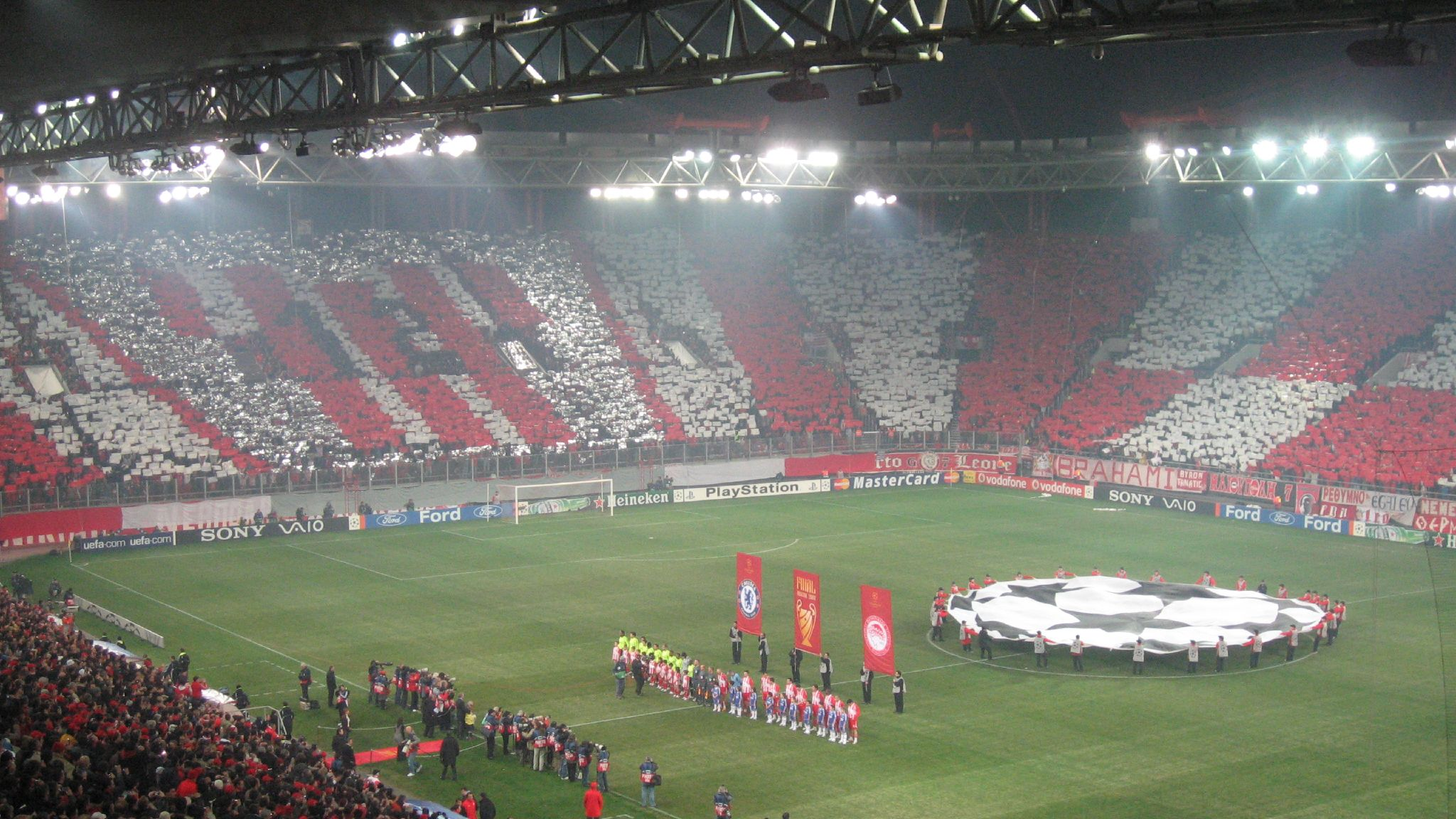
The koreo of Gate 7 in the match against Chelsea

Gate 7 (Greek: Θύρα 7, romanized: Thira 7) is the most popular association of organized fans of Olympiacos CFP.

== History ==
There is no exact date for the establishment of Θύρα 7. It took its name from the homonymous gate 7 of Karaiskakis Stadium, in Piraeus, from where its hard-core fans watched the Olympiacos games.

Sometime in the early 1970s, the then hardliners moved to this port from gate 13, due to the more affordable ticket prices.

Earlier, "SAFOP" (Association of Athenian Olympiacos Piraeus Fans) was created on Socratous Street and the "Red and White Army" behind Karaiskaki. Even earlier, in 1957, there was the "SFOP" (Association of Fans of Piraeus Olympiacos) with an organized presence on trips to Drama and Thessaloniki, but also to other cities in Greece.

== Main members ==
- First generation

Gotzila, Ekodomos, Girapas, Papachimonas, Liofagos, Ufo, Niro, Hamodrakas, Kondylopoulos, Halas, Timpestia.

- Second generation

Voukelatoi, Chroumbes, Ozi, Chocolate, Bekakos, Submariner, Acrobat, Akis, Clone, Poet, Charos, Korakis, Pagratiotis,

== Gate 7 today ==
After the demolition of the Karaiskakis Stadium and the construction of New Karaiskakis Stadium the association has established its Gate 7. It has a total of 156 sub-links in various parts of the world, in Greece, Cyprus, America, Germany, London, California, Ireland, Bologna, Belgrade and two major Greek communities in Australia, Sydney and Melbourne. The main Club of Gate 7 is "Kaminia". Some Clubs also are "Moschato", "Misfits" (Kallithea), "Brahami-Ilioupoli", "Koridallos", "Nea Liosia", "Pagrati".

== See also ==
- Karaiskakis Stadium disaster
