= Serbia–South Africa relations =

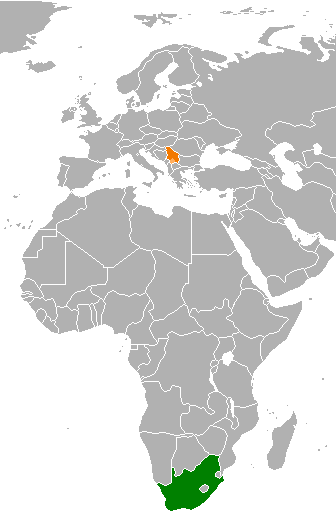
- South Africa: Serbia

South Africa and Serbia maintain diplomatic relations established in 1992 between South Africa and Federal Republic of Yugoslavia (of which Serbia is considered sole legal successor) in 1993.

== History ==
South Africa is Serbia's traditional partner in Africa and the two nations have had excellent relations since the signing of diplomatic relations in 1992 following the end of the apartheid system. South Africa is also home to around 20,000 Serbs, mainly residing in the Johannesburg area. South Africa has voiced support for Serbia over the issue of Kosovo's independence. Nelson Mandela is an honorary citizen of Belgrade.

In 2010, Serbian Minister of Foreign Affairs Vuk Jeremić visited South Africa and met International Relations and Cooperation Minister Maite Nkoana-Mashabane. During this visit, Serbia pledged its support for South Africa's candidature for a non-permanent seat on the United Nations Security Council for the 2011–2012 term.

== South Africa's stance on Kosovo ==
South Africa backs Serbia's position regarding Kosovo and its reaction to the 2008 Kosovo declaration of independence is one of non-recognition.

== Resident diplomatic missions ==
- Serbia has an embassy in Pretoria.
- South Africa has a non-resident embassy in Athens (Greece) which is also accredited to Serbia.

== See also ==
- Foreign relations of Serbia
- Foreign relations of South Africa
- Yugoslavia and the Non-Aligned Movement
- Yugoslavia and the Organisation of African Unity
- Serbs in South Africa
