= Serbs in Greece =

Σέρβοι στην Ελλάδα Срби у Грчкој Srbi u Grčkoj

Total population
- 2,456 (2021)

Regions with significant populations
- Athens, Thessaloniki

Languages
- Serbian and Greek

Religion
- Eastern Orthodoxy

Serbs in Greece are Greek citizens of ethnic Serb descent and/or Serbia-born persons living in Greece. According to data from the 2021 census, there were 2,456 Serbian citizens in Greece.

== Heritage ==
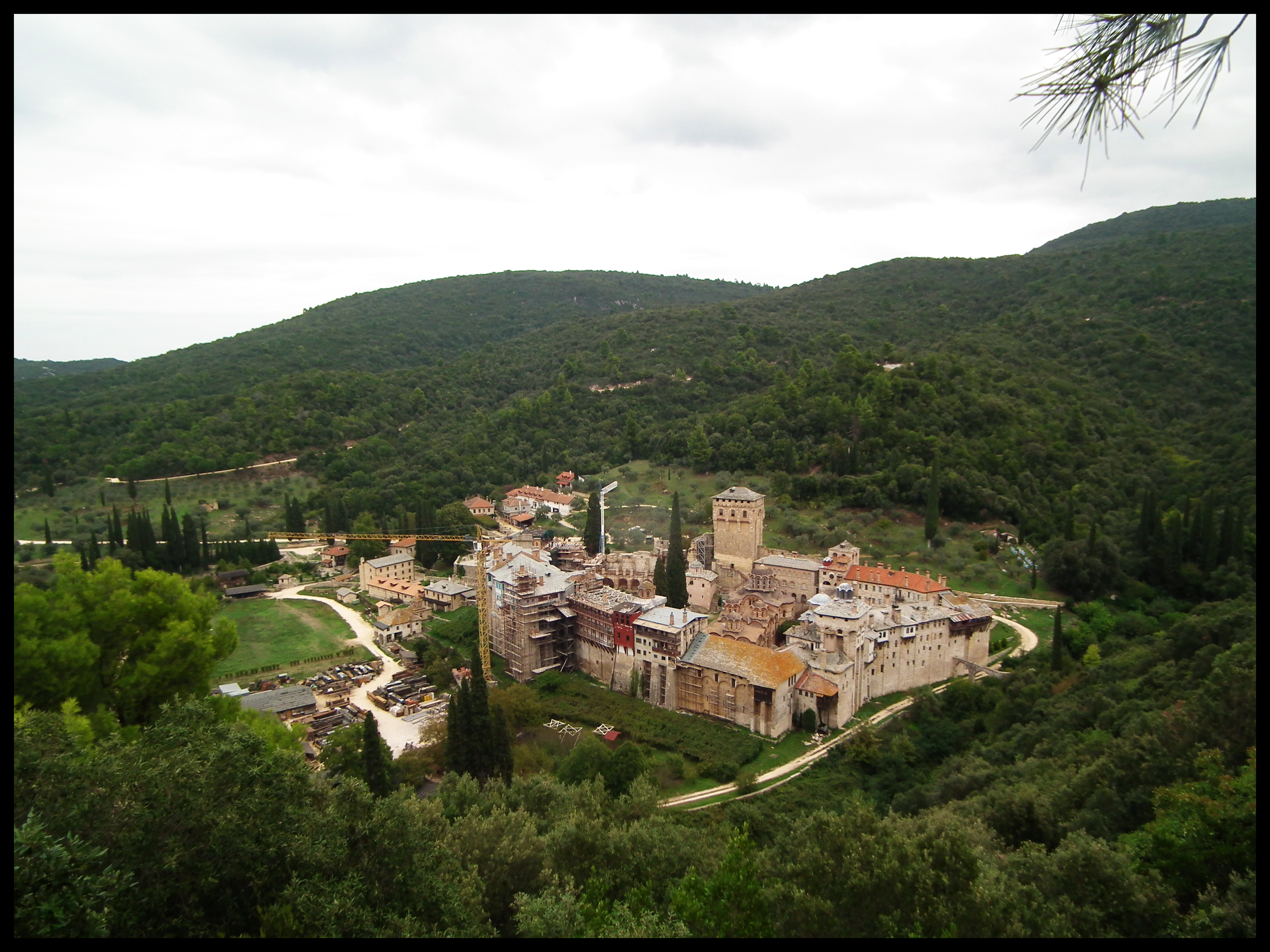
Serbian Orthodox Hilandar Monastery

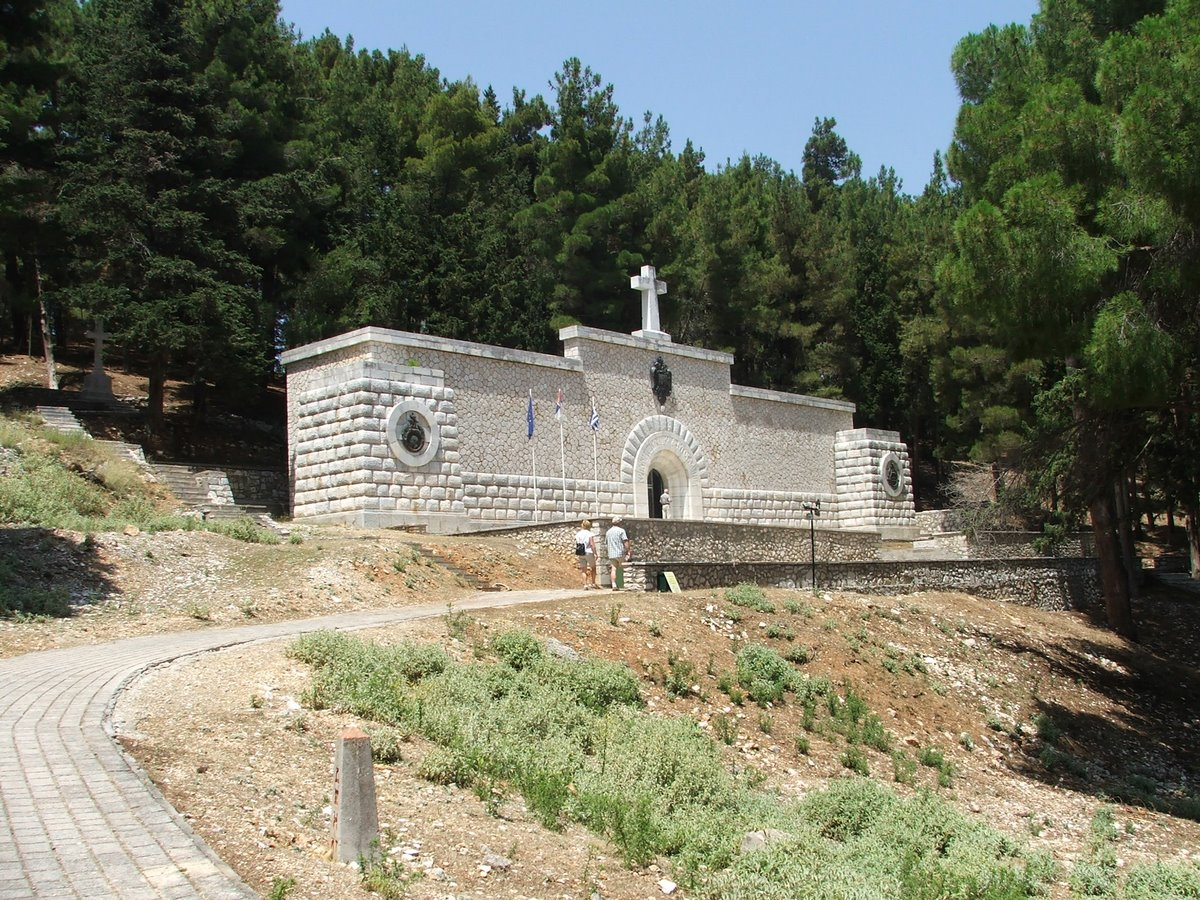
Vido Mausoleum

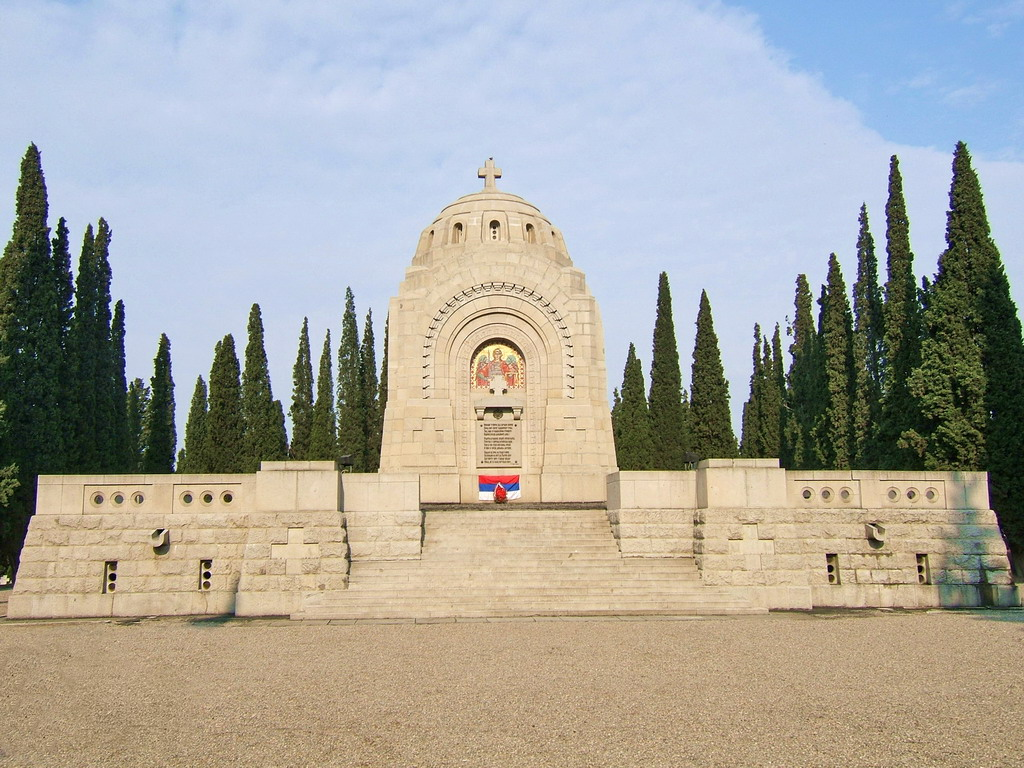
Zeitenlik military cemetery

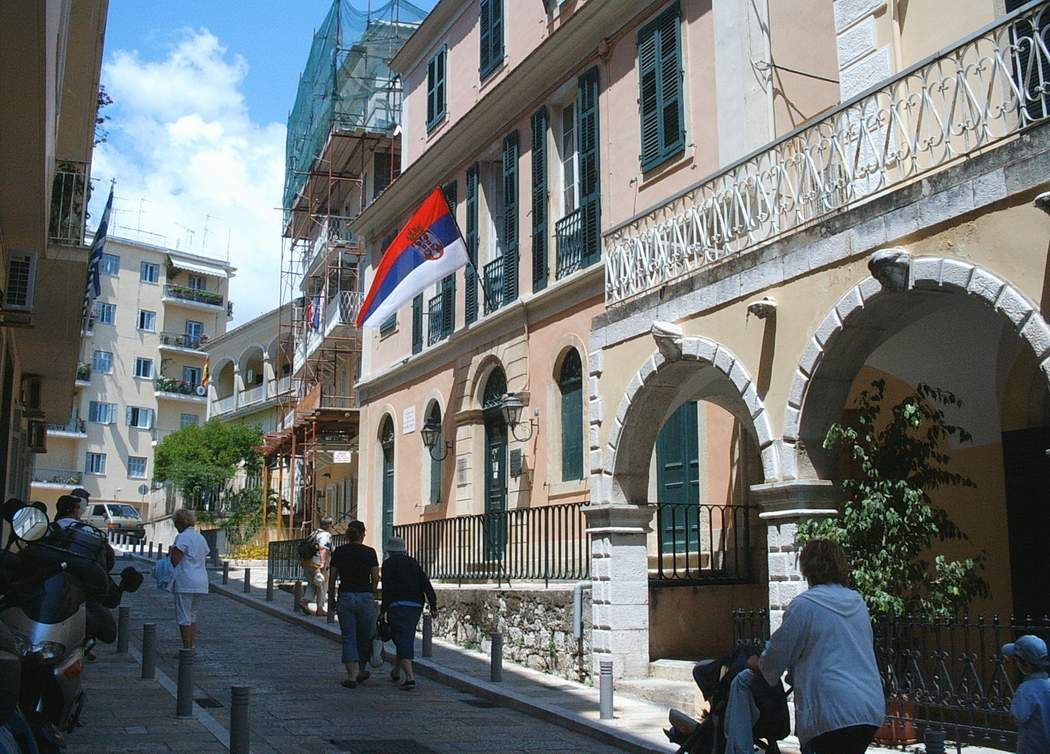
Serbian Museum in Corfu

== Notable people ==
- Vasos Mavrovouniotis – revolutionary
- Timoleon Vassos – army officer and general
- George Berovich – Ottoman prince
- Panos Markovic, football coach and player
- Đorđe Mihailović – recipient of the Order of the Serbian Flag
- Dušan Šakota – basketball player
- Vlado Janković – basketball player
- Dimitrios Popović – football player

== See also ==
- Immigration to Greece
- Serb diaspora
- Greece–Serbia relations

== Sources ==
- Blagojevic, Gordana (2006). "Колонија Срба у Солуну" (PDF). Glasnik Etnografskog Instituta (54): 39–45. doi:10.2298/GEI0654039B.
- Blagojevic, Gordana (2007). "Српске школе и настава српског језика у Грчкој у 20. веку" (PDF). Glasnik Etnografskog Instituta. 55: 233–244. doi:10.2298/GEI0701233B.
- Pavićević, Aleksandra (2004). "Ambiguity of Integration Processes: The Serbs in Greece. National Identity of the New Immigrants". Ethnologia Balkanica (8): 103–114.
