= Karaiskakis Stadium disaster =

1981 fatal incident in Piraeus, Greece

Coordinates: 37°56′47.21″N 23°39′51.54″E

- Date: 8 February 1981; 45 years ago
- Time: 16:58 EET (14:58 UTC)
- Location: Karaiskakis Stadium Faliro, Piraeus, Greece
- Deaths: 21
- Injuries: >=55

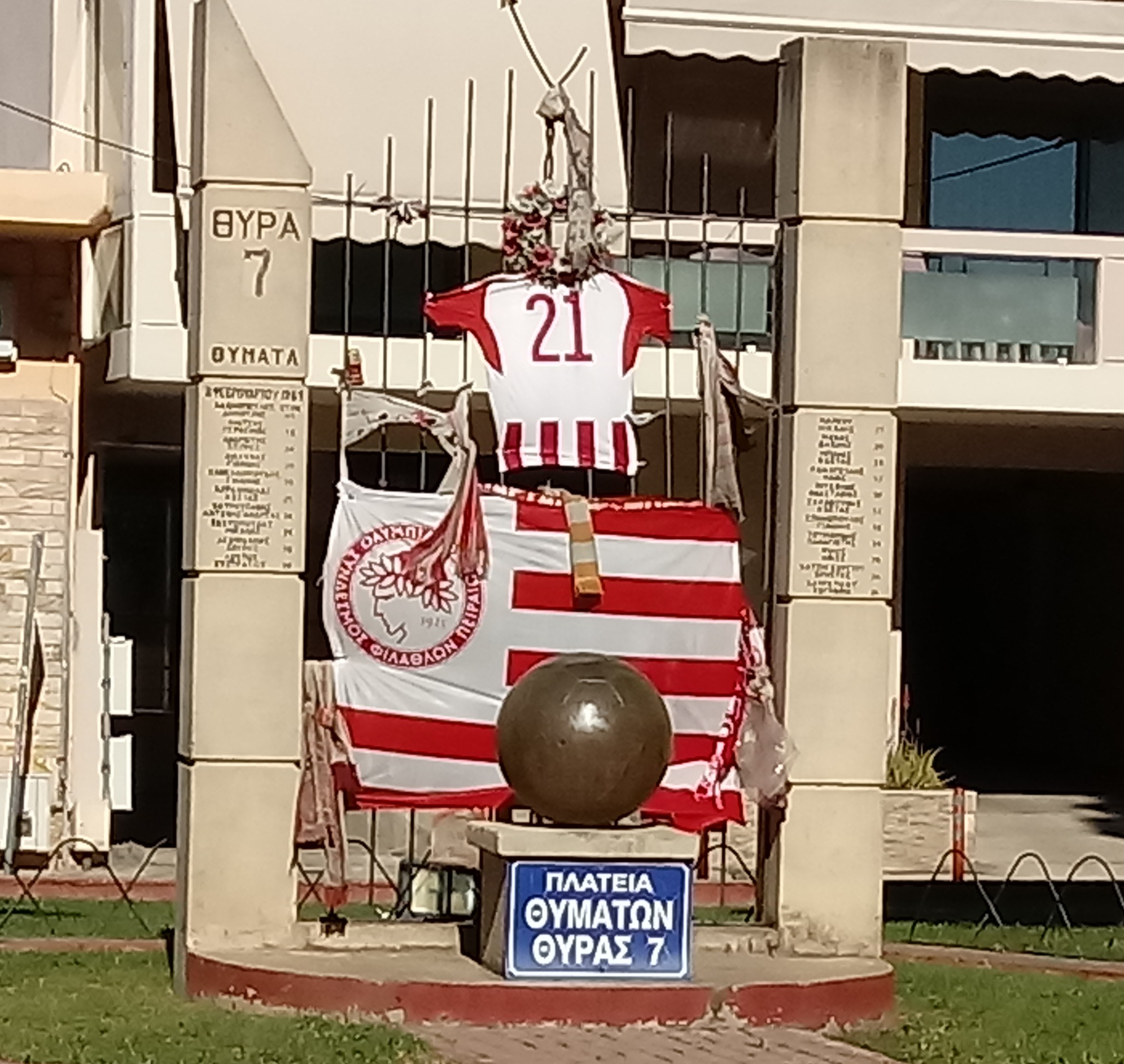
The new monument at "Square of Gate 7 Victims" with the names of the fallen

The Karaiskakis Stadium disaster, also called the Gate 7 Tragedy, was an incident that occurred on 8 February 1981 at the Karaiskakis Stadium in Neo Faliro, Piraeus, Greece, after the conclusion of a football match between Olympiacos and AEK Athens. It is the worst football tragedy in Greece's history.

== The incident ==
A total of 21 people, 20 supporters of Olympiacos and one supporter of AEK, died while rushing out of the stadium to celebrate the 6–0 victory of Olympiacos against AEK Athens. The accident occurred at the historic Gate 7 (Θύρα 7). The stadium has since been rebuilt as a modern football field (not a stadium).

The accident occurred at Gate 7 of the stadium, a gate where supporters of Olympiacos were concentrated, however, one of the victims was a supporter of AEK Athens, a friend of an Olympiacos supporter.

=== Causes ===
There are still debates regarding the causes that led to the disaster. The main cause of the accident, according to the official police report, seems to have been a partially closed door. While exiting, some fans lost their balance and fell on the last steps: dozens fell onto each other and were stepped over by a horde of unsuspecting fans who kept coming in. 19 supporters died at the stadium, while another two died of their injuries in hospital, with 55 being injured, many of them seriously. Most of the dead and wounded were teenagers and young adults.

== Legacy ==
=== Annual memorial service ===
In memory of this event, every year on February 8, there is a memorial service at the stadium in honor of the supporters that died in that incident. The service is attended by thousands of fans every year, who rhythmically shout the phrase "Αδέρφια, ζείτε, εσείς μας οδηγείτε." (Adhérfia, zíte, esís mas odhiyíte, "Brothers, you live, you are the ones who guide us."). At the tribune part of the stadium at Gate 7, some seats are colored black instead of red, shaping the number "7", whereas there is also a monument on the eastern side of the stadium, bearing the names of all 21 supporters killed on that day.

=== Other teams ===
Even though this incident affected almost solely the fanbase of Olympiacos, other teams occasionally pay their respects to the people killed as well, as they consider the incident to be a tragedy not only for one team but for the whole country. In the past, even foreign teams, such as Liverpool F.C. and Red Star Belgrade have honored the incident's victims.

=== Gate 7 fan group ===
"Gate 7" (Θύρα 7), οne of the biggest and most supportive fan clubs of Olympiacos, was named after the incident. Although "Gate 7" members are generally considered to be ultras, the people sitting in that gate before and during the incident were normal supporters, without season tickets (as in the old stadium only gate 1—which was a VIP gate—supported some season tickets).
