= Serb diaspora =

Ethnic Serbs and their descendants living outside Serbia and its neighbouring countries

The Serb diaspora (Serbian: Српска дијаспора, romanized: Srpska dijaspora) (Note: Traditionally termed Срби у расејању, Srbi u rasejanju (lit. 'Serbs in dispersion' or 'scattered Serbs').) consists of ethnic Serbs and their descendants living outside Serbia and its neighboring countries. Recent estimates indicate that about 1.6 million ethnic Serbs and their descendants live abroad, predominantly in Europe and, to a much lesser extent, overseas (primarily in North America and Oceania).

Serbs in the countries bordering Serbia, commonly termed "Serbs in the Region" (Срби у Региону, Srbi u Regionu), are not regarded as part of the Serb diaspora, since they constitute autochthonous communities that have the legal status of recognized ethnic minorities or, in case of Bosnia and Herzegovina, one of the constituent peoples.

== History ==
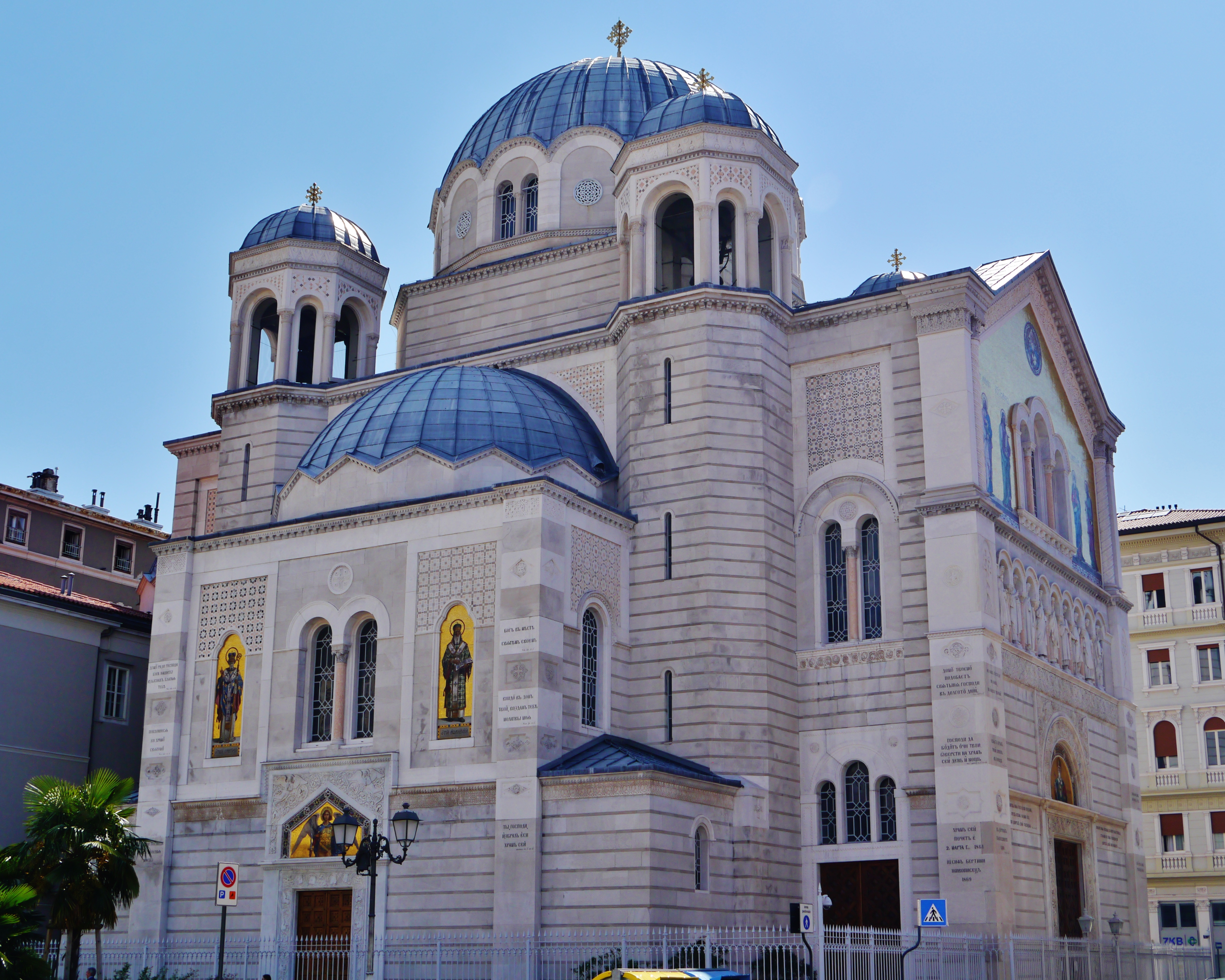
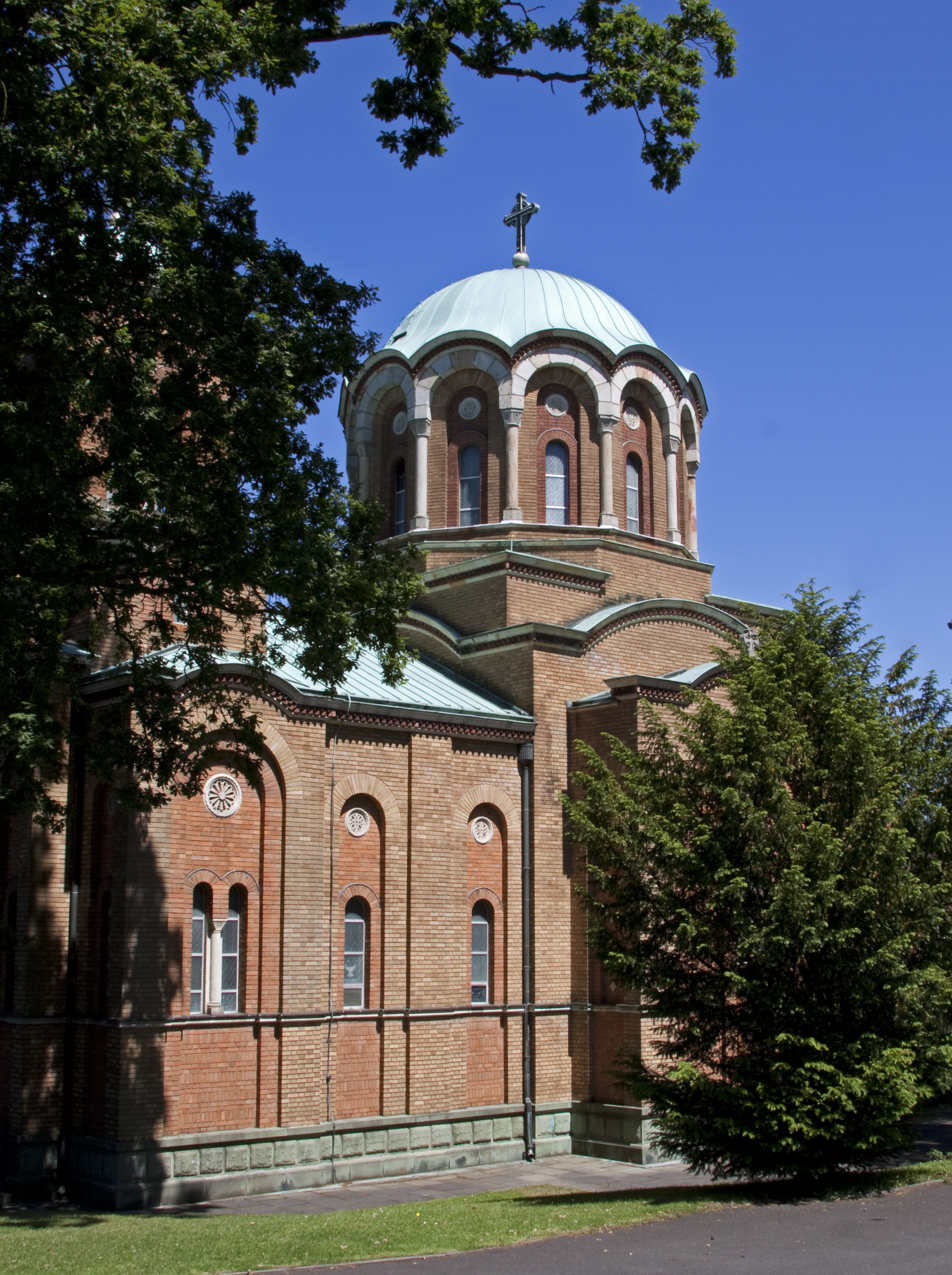
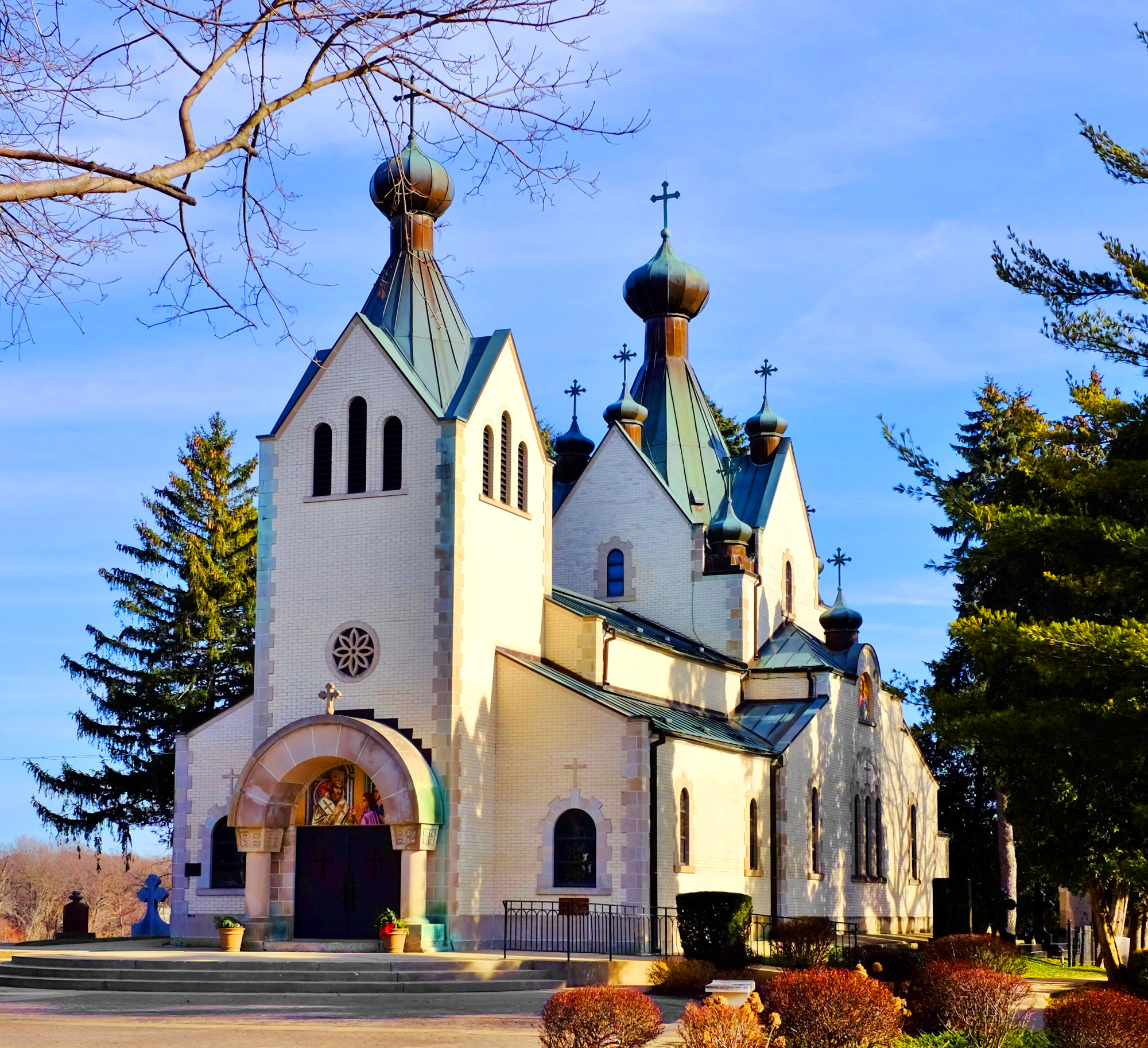
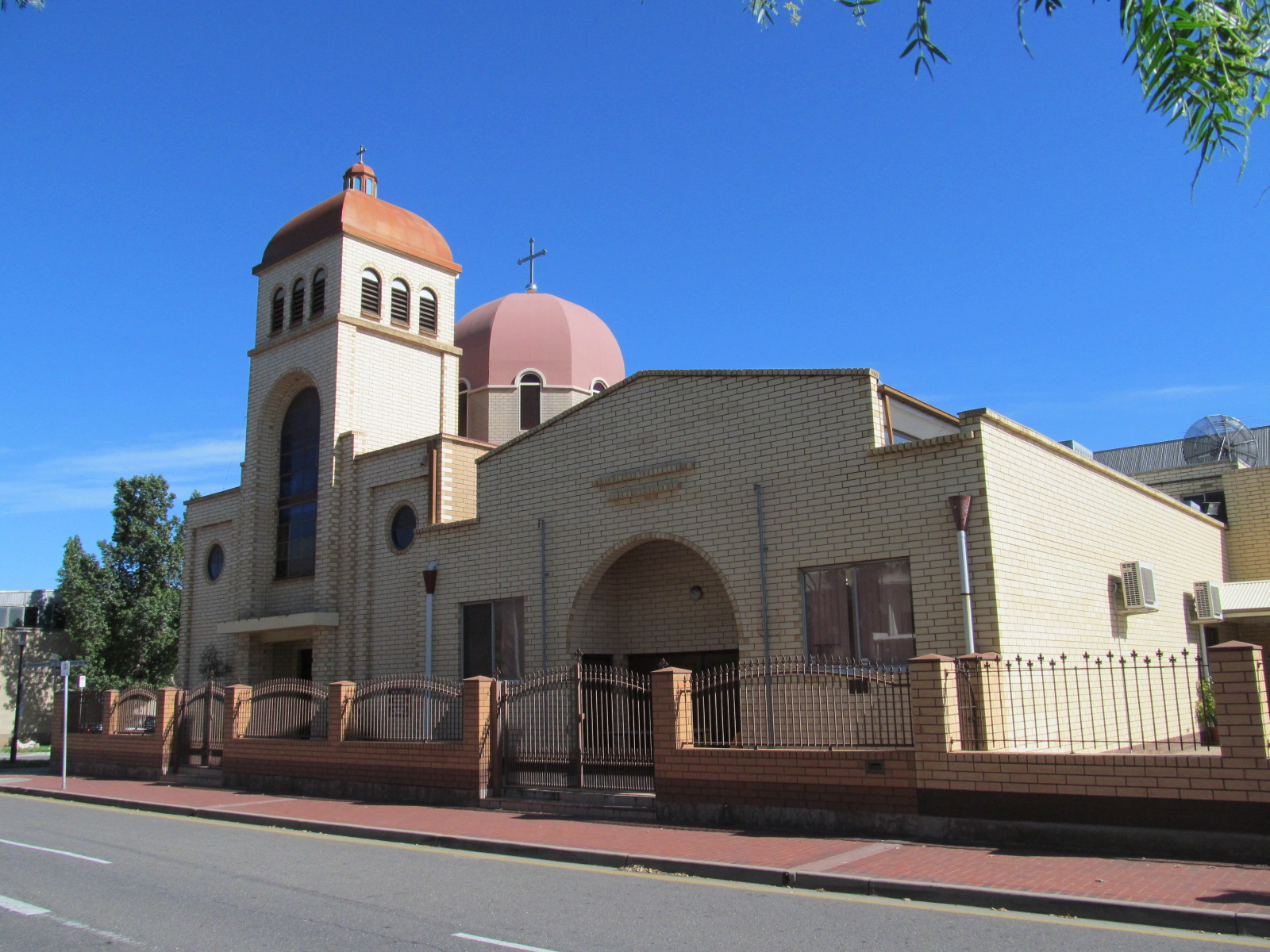
Serbian Orthodox churches in diaspora (clockwise from top left): Saint Spyridon in Trieste, Italy; Saint Prince Lazar in Birmingham, United Kingdom; Saint Sava in Libertyville, United States; Saint Sava in Adelaide, Australia.

The emigration of ethnic Serbs in the modern age could be categorized into several waves. The first wave included emigrants from regions towards the Adriatic Sea and the Habsburg monarchy, in the 19th century, and notable individuals were Nikola Tesla, Mihajlo Pupin and Milutin Milanković. The second wave came in the aftermath of World War II in Yugoslavia, when tens of thousands prisoners-of-war did not return to Socialist Yugoslavia; liberalisation efforts of the Communist regime in the 1950s allowed for children of war emigrants to leave the country, with examples such as Charles Simic and Steve Tesich.

In the 1960s came the third, larger wave, of "Gastarbeiters" (guest-workers). The Yugoslav state encouraged its citizens of rural and city peripheries to work abroad temporarily, in order to earn money for a better life back home. By the early 1970s, more than a million Yugoslavs lived abroad, the majority in Germany. In the 1980s, youngsters of the middle- and high class emigrated.

The Yugoslav Wars of the 1990s saw emigration of recruit-aged, and the expulsion of ethnic Serb communities in Croatia and Bosnia and Herzegovina. Serbia and Montenegro suffered hyperinflation, international sanctions, economic collapse, and finally the NATO bombing of 1999. During that single decade an estimated 300,000 people, disproportionately young and educated, left Serbia. This period saw the first massive "brain drain" - doctors, engineers, and university professors who have never returned.

The descendants of the early economic migrants, the post-World War II war political exiles, the gastarbeiters, the 1990s war refugees, and the 21st-century brain-drain generation now form communities across every continent.

== Demographics ==
Countries with significant Serb population + 1,000,000 + 100,000 + 10,000 + 1,000

Country	Population	Note
Germany	387,000 (2023 est.)	See also Serbs in Germany.
Austria	300,000 (2025 est.)	See also Serbs in Austria.
United States	176,643 (2024)	See also Serbian Americans.
France	120,000 (2008 est.)	See also Serbs in France.
Switzerland	120,000 (2008 est.)	See also Serbs in Switzerland.
Australia	94,997 (2021)	See also Serbian Australians.
Canada	93,360 (2021)	See also Serbian Canadians.
Sweden	80,000 (2008 est.)	See also Serbs in Sweden.
United Kingdom	70,000 (2001 est.)	See also Serbs in the United Kingdom.
Slovenia	38,964 (2002)	See also Serbs in Slovenia.
Italy	29,679 (2024) (Note: The figure represents Serbia-born people in Italy.)	See also Serbs in Italy.
Netherlands	20,297 (2024)	See also Serbs in the Netherlands.
South Africa	20,000 (2014 est.)	See also Serbs in South Africa.
Norway	8,964 (2025) (Note: The figure represents Serbia-born people in Norway.)	See also Serbs in Norway.
Malta	5,935 (2021) (Note: The figure represents Serbia-born people in Malta.)	See also Serbs in Malta.
Argentina	5,000 (2008 est.)	See also Serbian Argentines.
Belgium	4,151 (2021) (Note: The figure represents Serbia-born people in Belgium.)	
Czechia	4,101 (2021)	See also Serbs in the Czech Republic.
Denmark	3,949 (2024) (Note: The figure represents Serbian citizens in Denmark.)	See also Serbs in Denmark.
Spain	3,943 (2022)	See also Serbs in Spain.
Greece	2,456 (2021) (Note: The figure represents Serbian citizens in Greece.)	See also Serbs in Greece.
Russia	2,151 (2020)	See also Serbs in Russia.
Slovakia	1,876 (2021)	See also Serbs in Slovakia.
New Zealand	1,347 (2023)	See also Serbian New Zealanders.
Luxembourg	1,218 (2021)	See also Serbs in Luxembourg.
Poland	1,149 (2021)	See also Serbs in Poland.
Cyprus	1,009 (2011) (Note: The figure represents Serbian citizens in Cyprus.)	
Finland	702 (2023) (Note: The figure represents Serbian citizens in Finland.)	
Ukraine	623 (2001)	See also Serbs in Ukraine.
Iceland	606 (2024) (Note: The figure represents Serbian citizens in Iceland.)	
Bulgaria	569 (2011)	See also Serbs in Bulgaria.
Belarus	500 (2008 est.)	See also Serbs in Belarus.
Portugal	425 (2024)	See also Serbs in Portugal.
Ireland	343 (2016)	

== Notable people ==
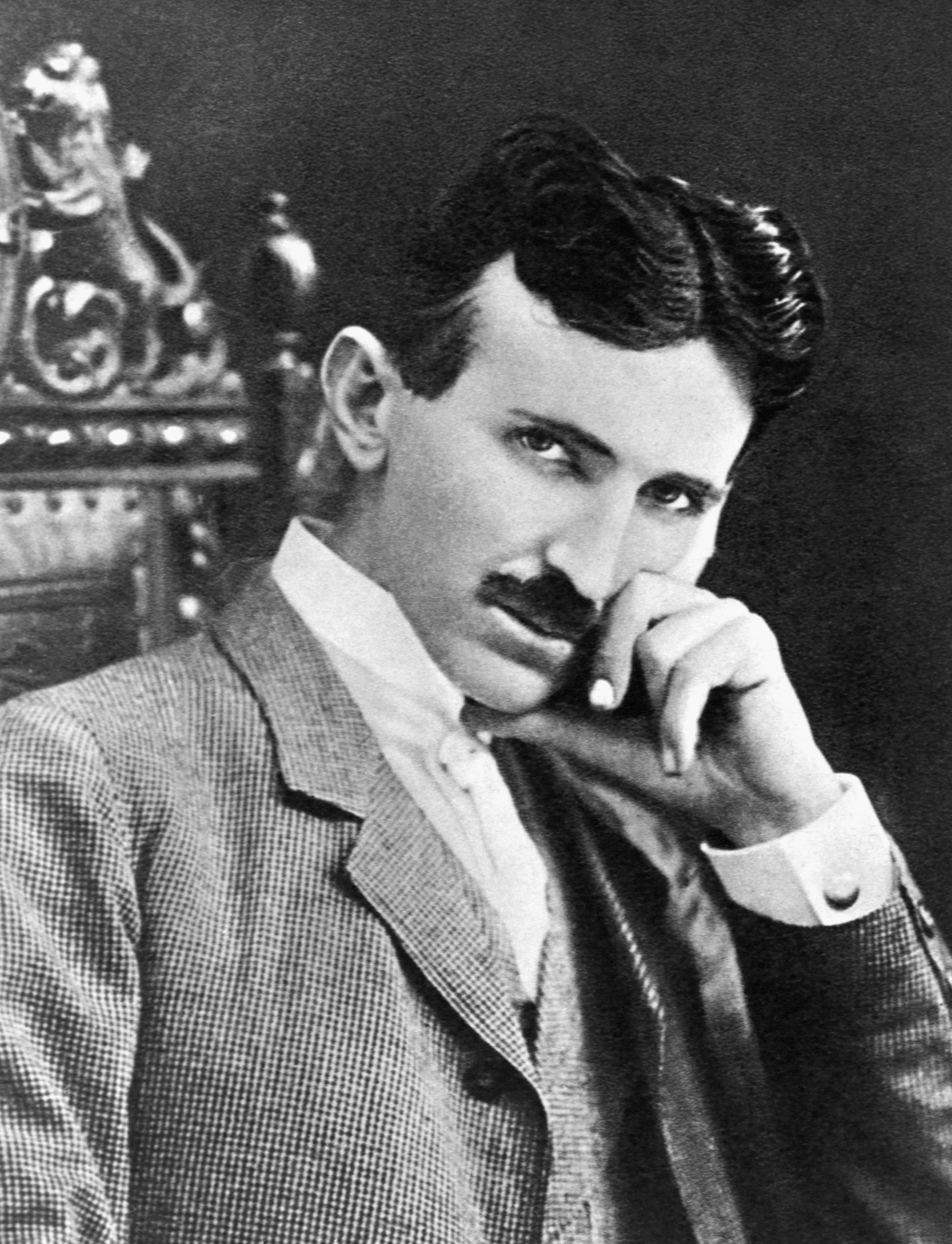
(United States) Nikola Tesla

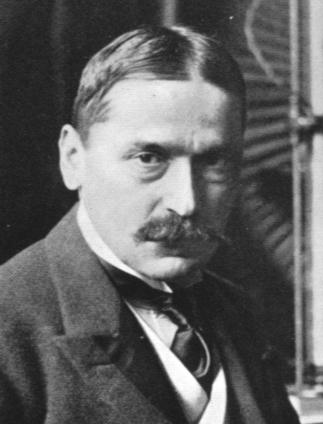
(United States) Mihajlo Pupin

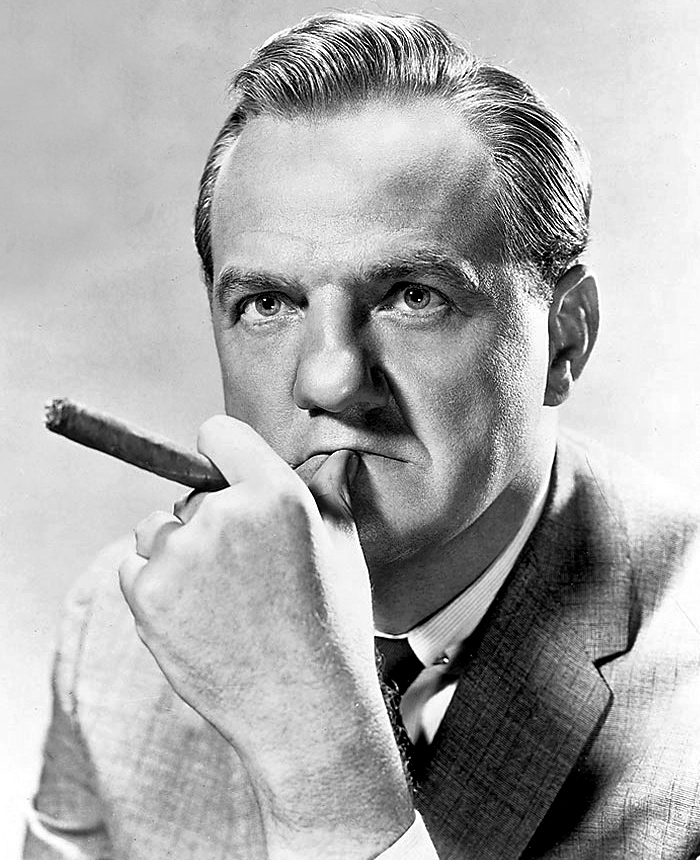
(United States) Karl Malden

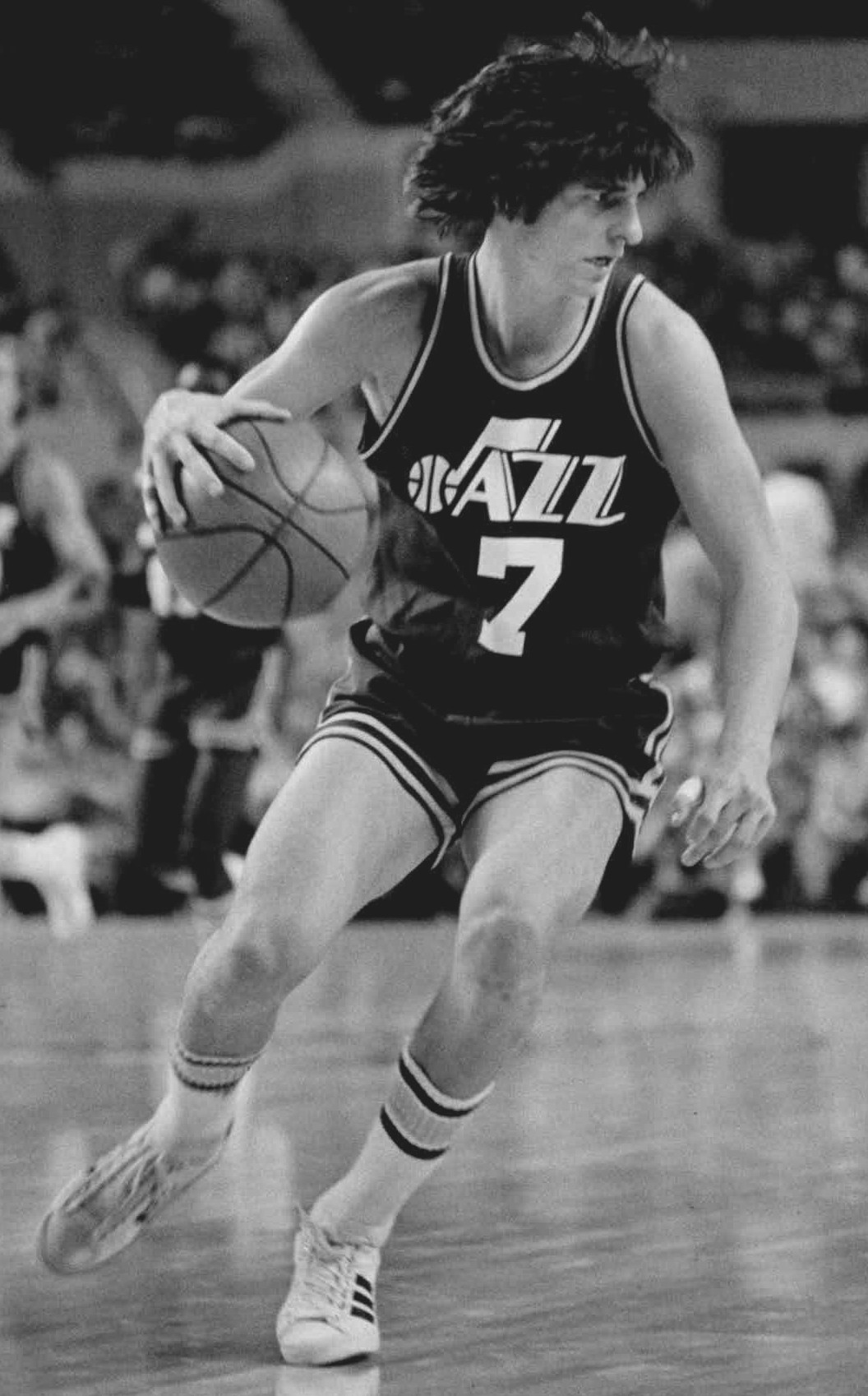
(United States) Pete Maravich

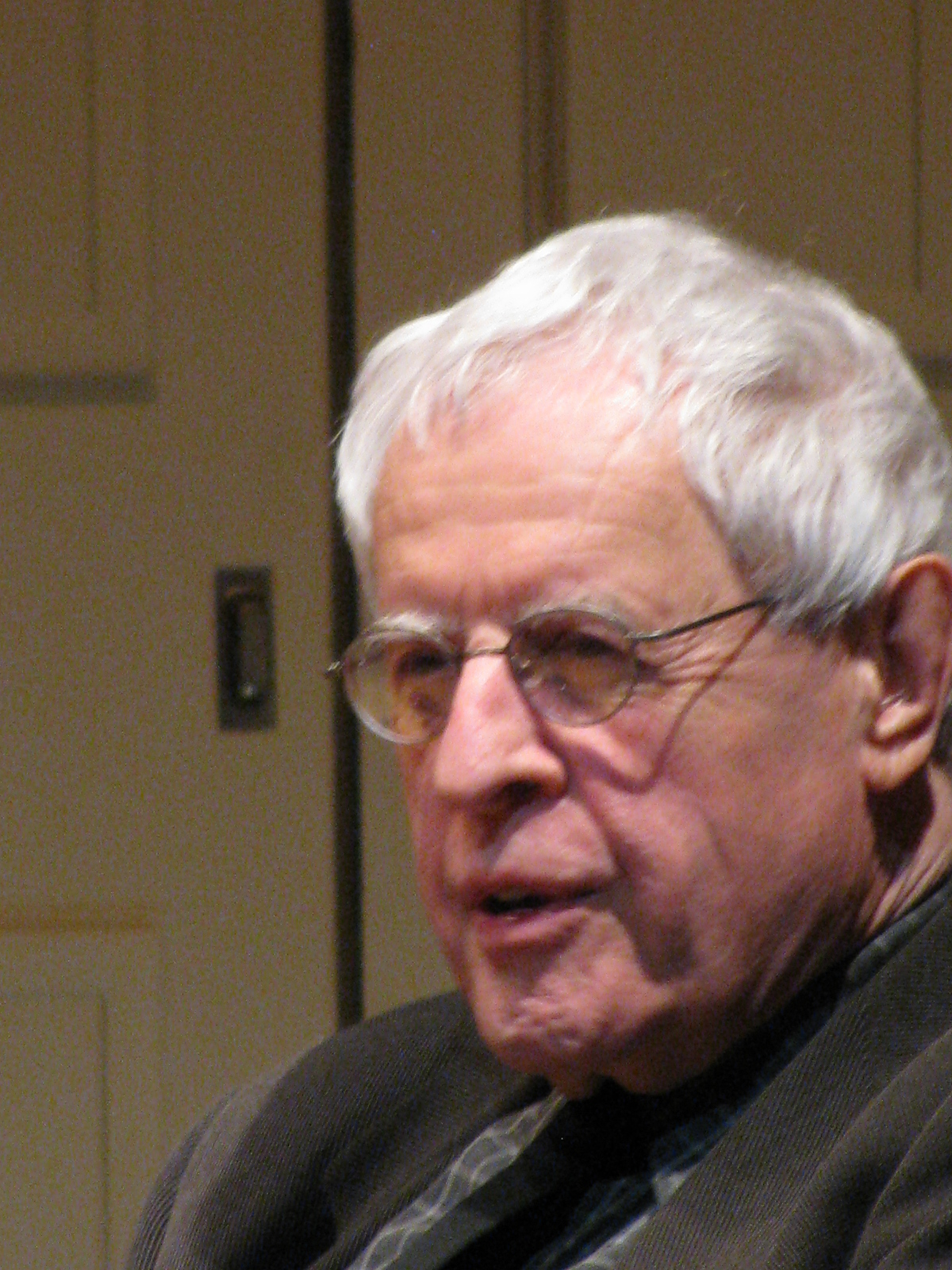
(United States) Charles Simic

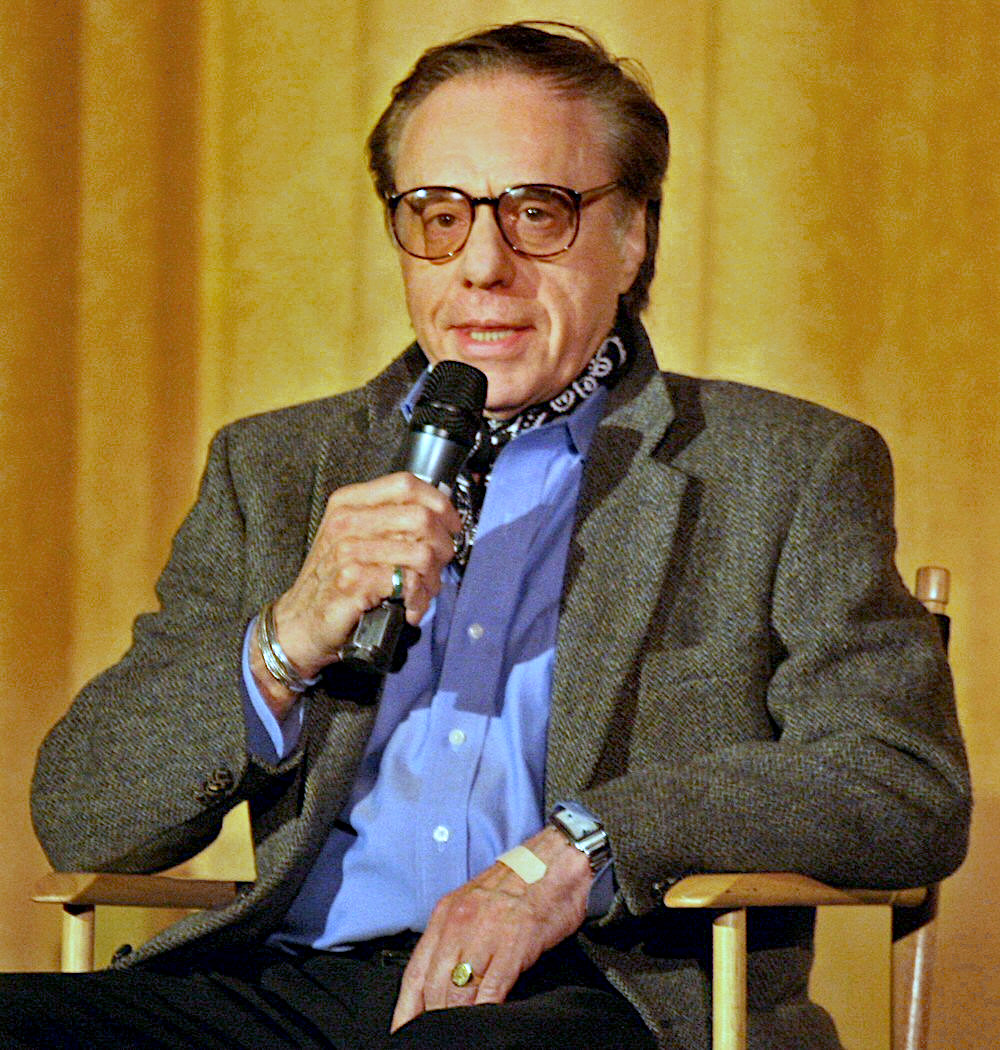
(United States) Peter Bogdanovich

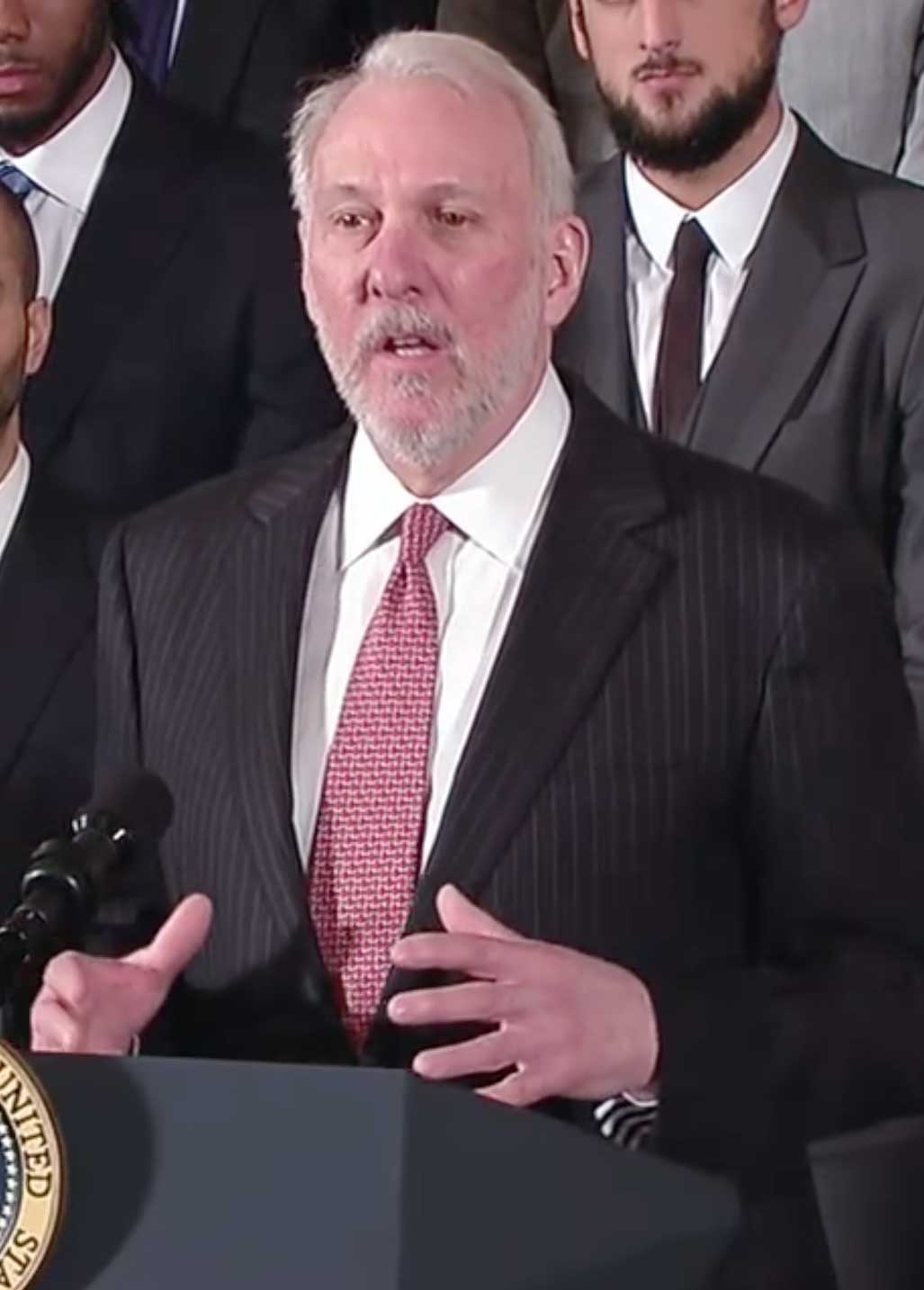
(United States) Gregg Popovich

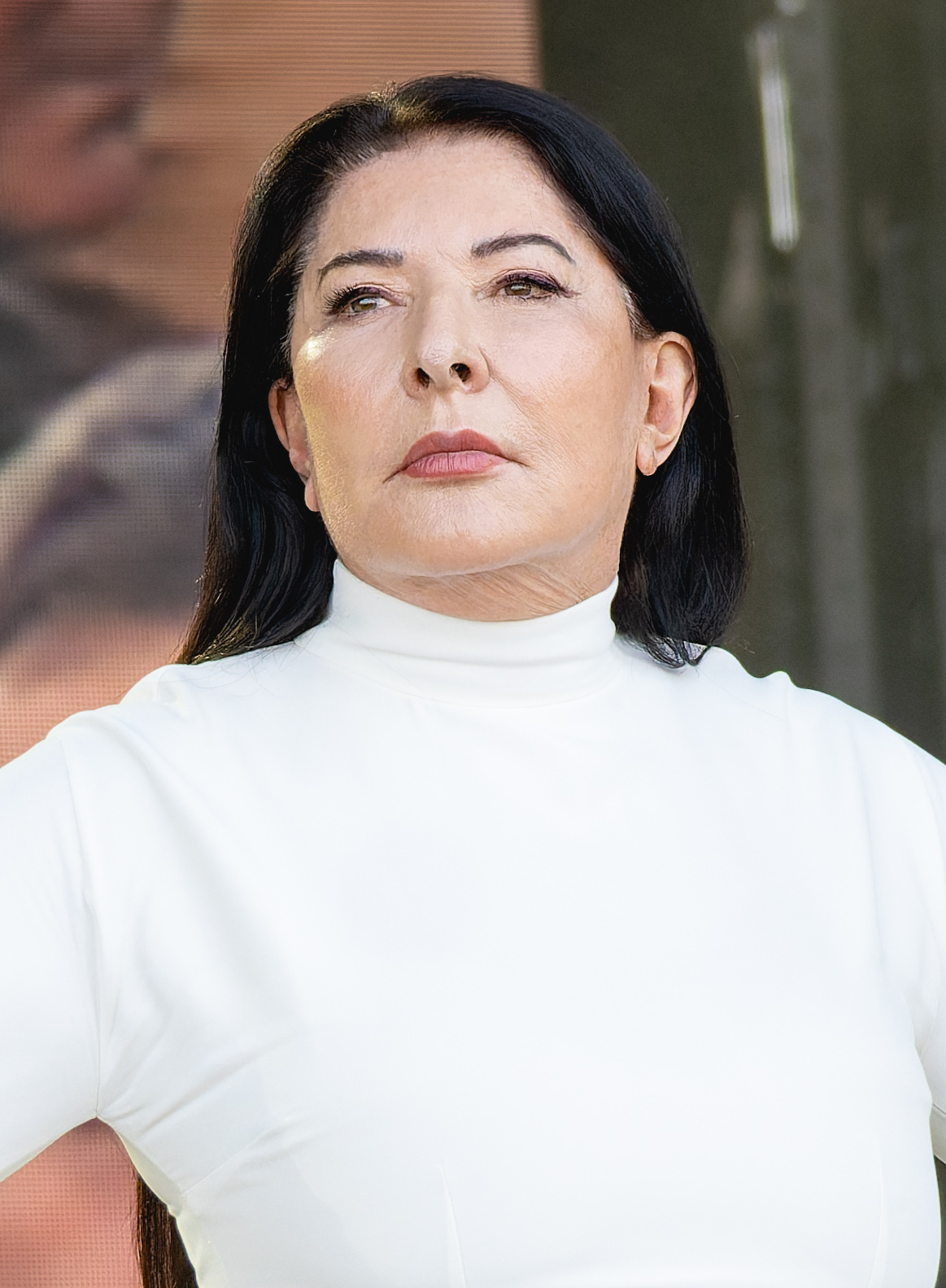
(United States) Marina Abramović

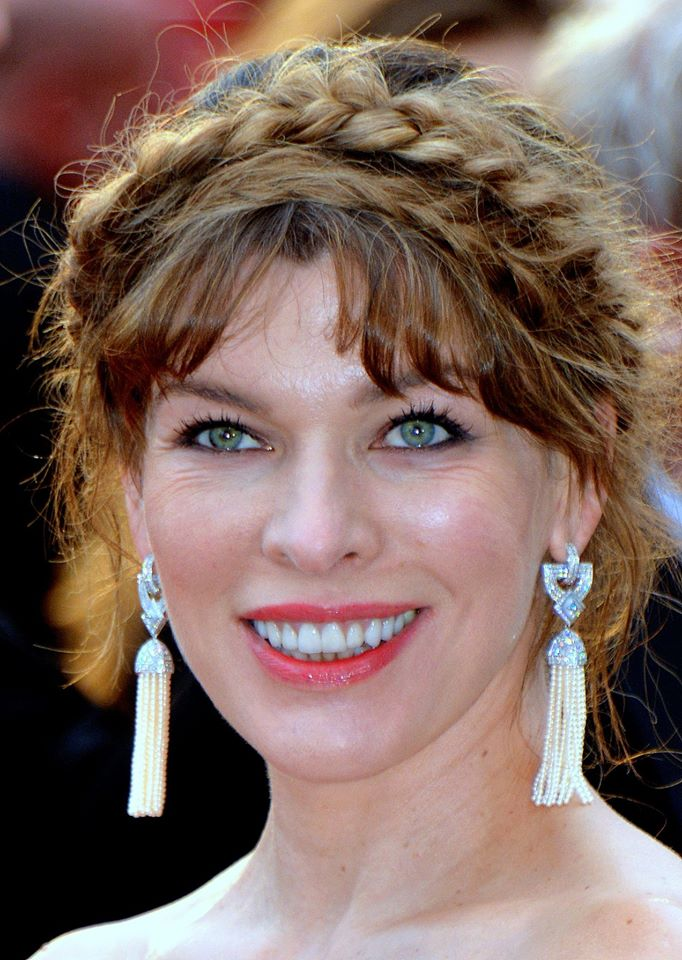
(United States) Milla Jovovich

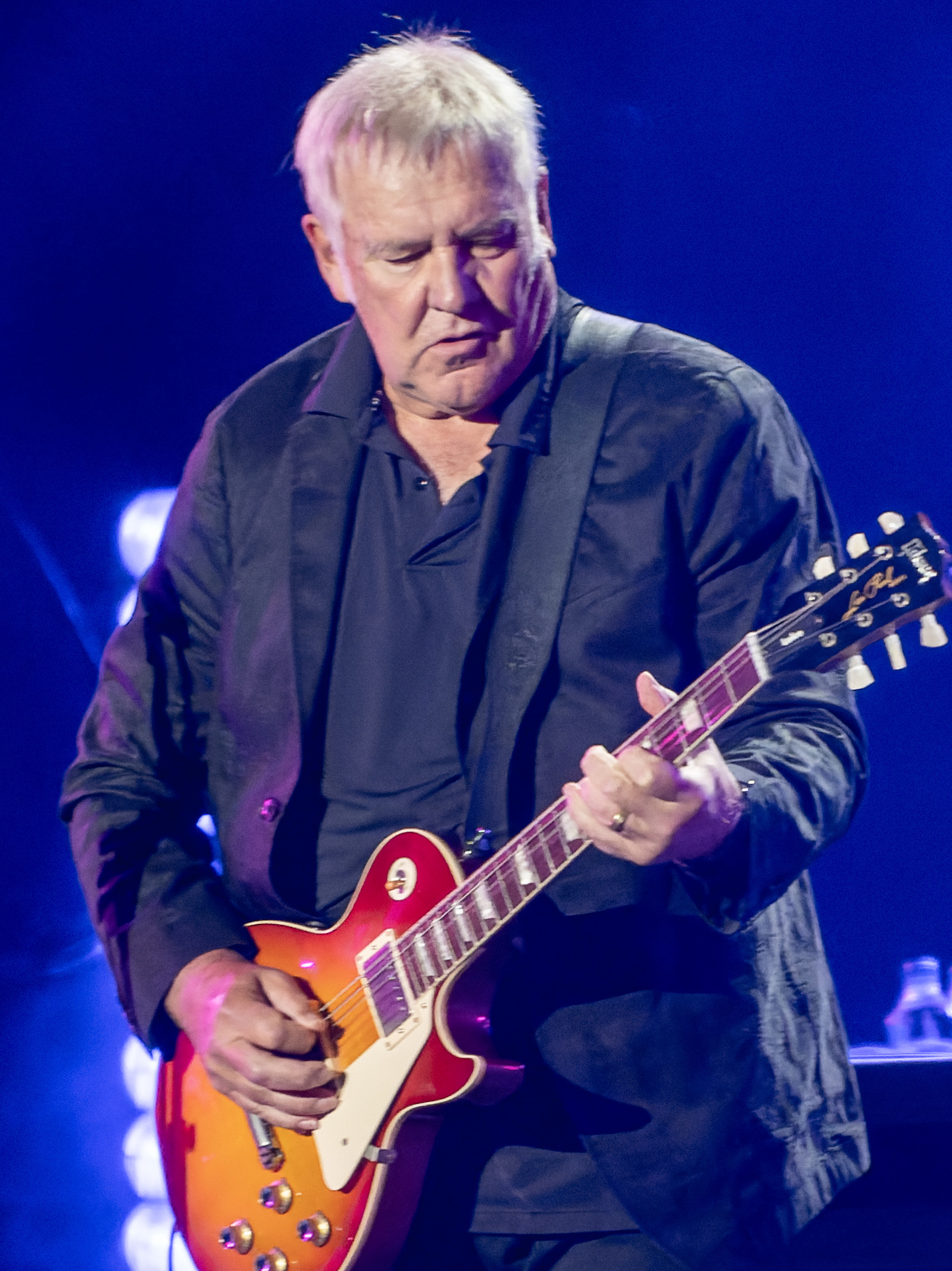
(Canada) Alex Lifeson

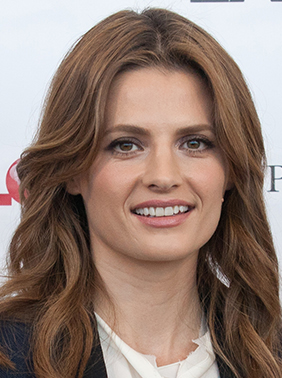
(Canada) Stana Katic

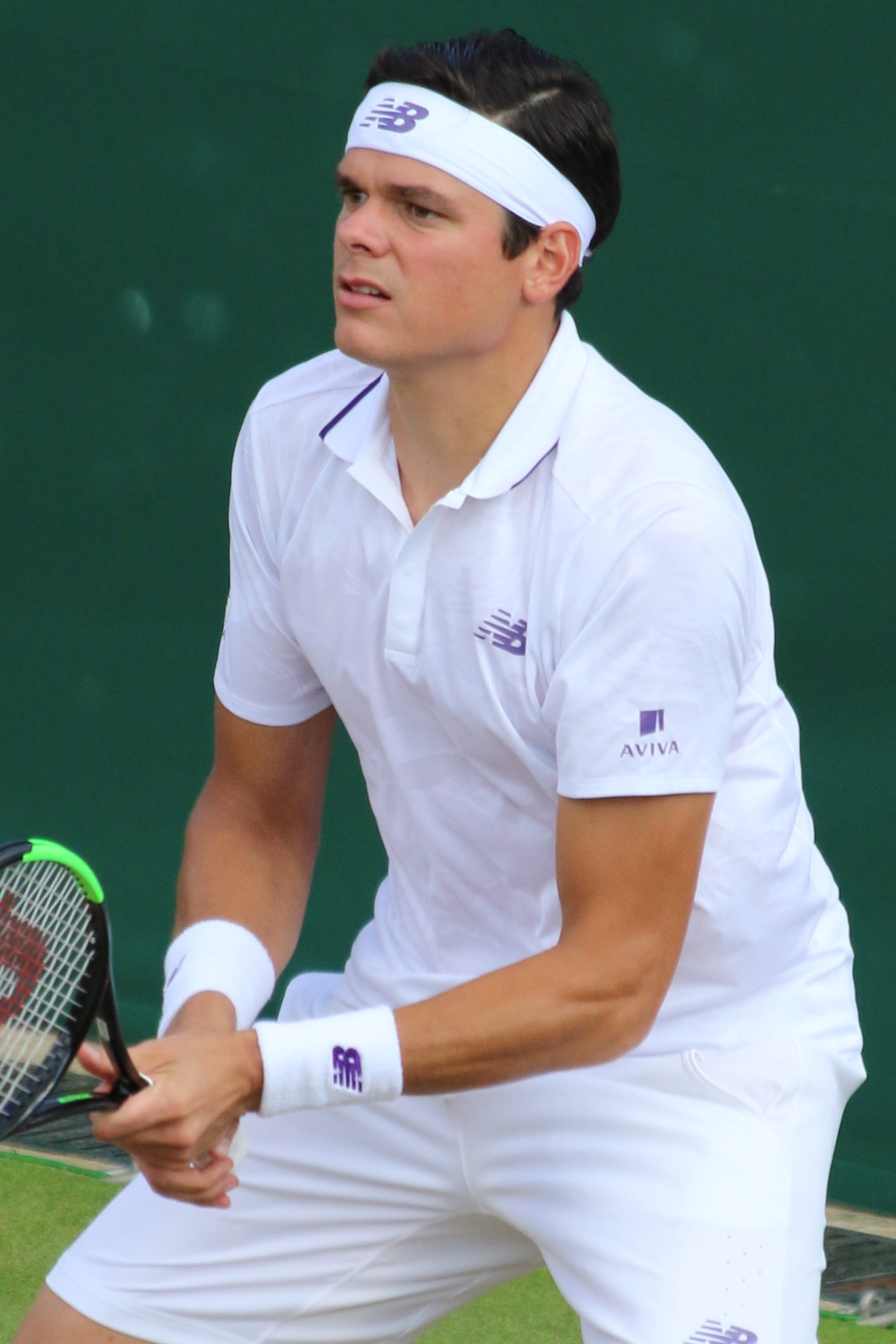
(Canada) Milos Raonic

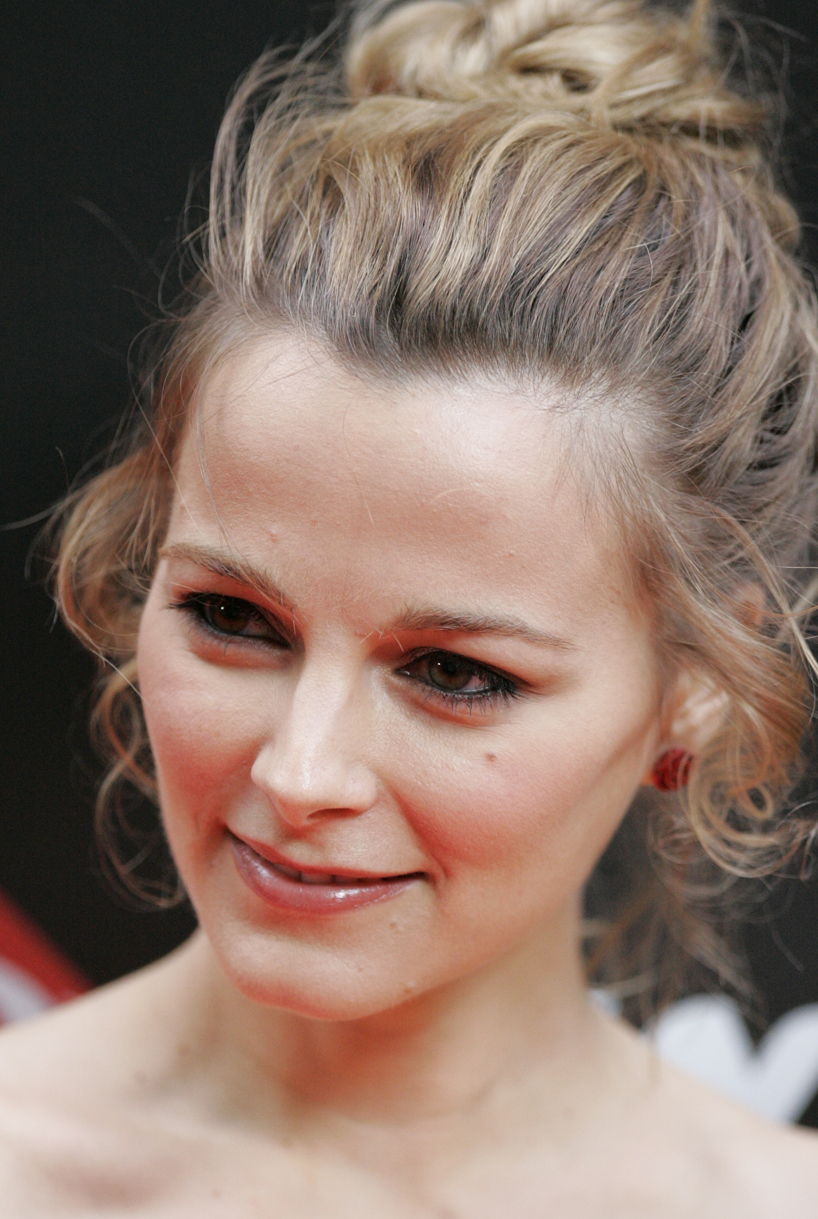
(Australia) Bojana Novakovic

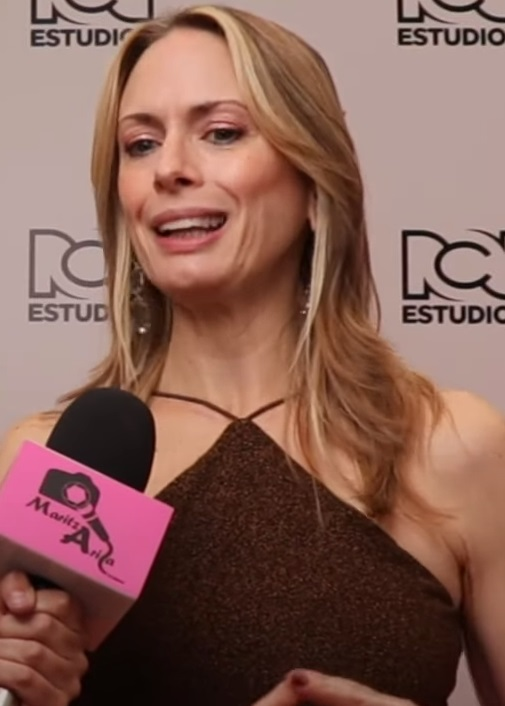
(Argentina) Geraldine Zivic

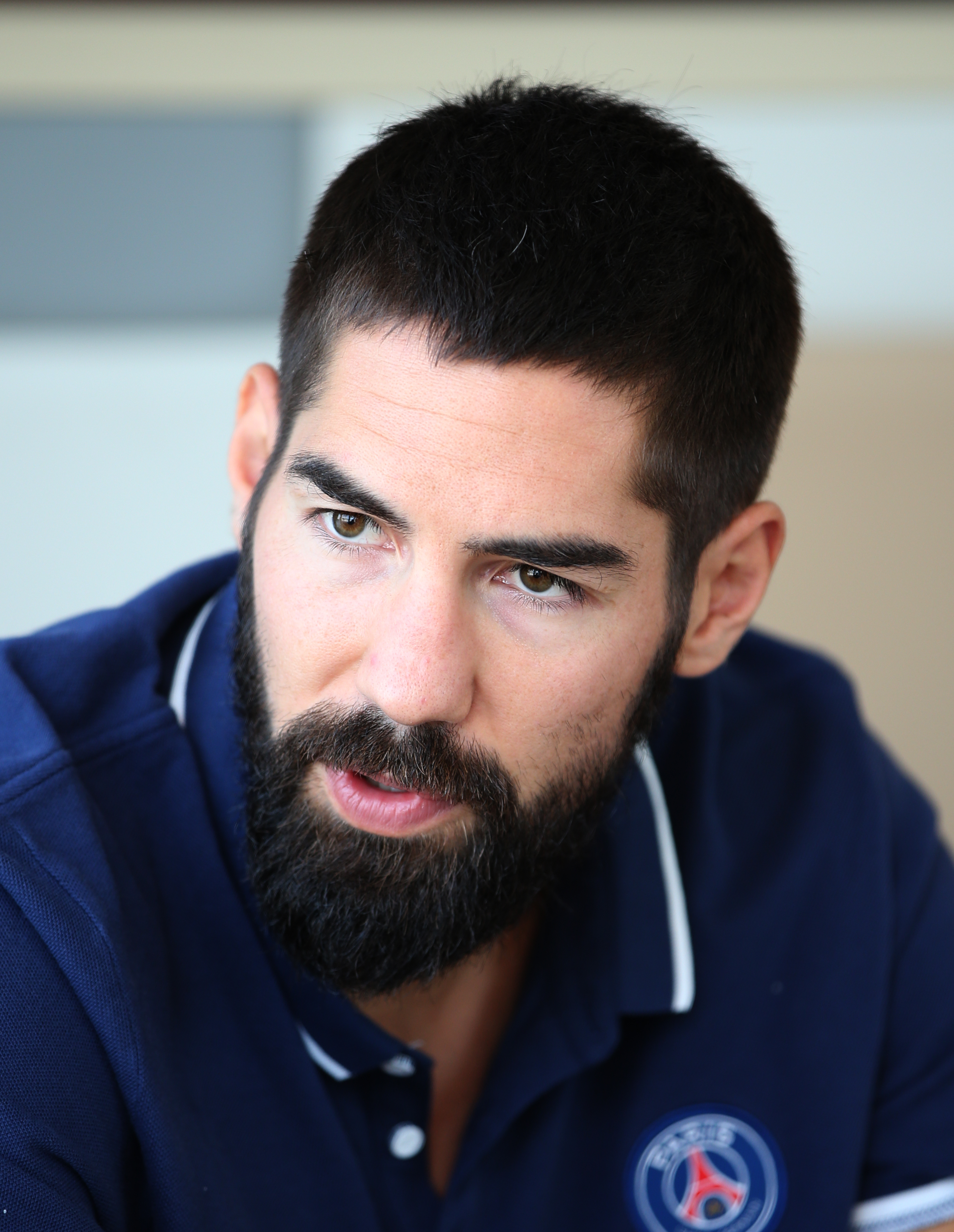
(France) Nikola Karabatić

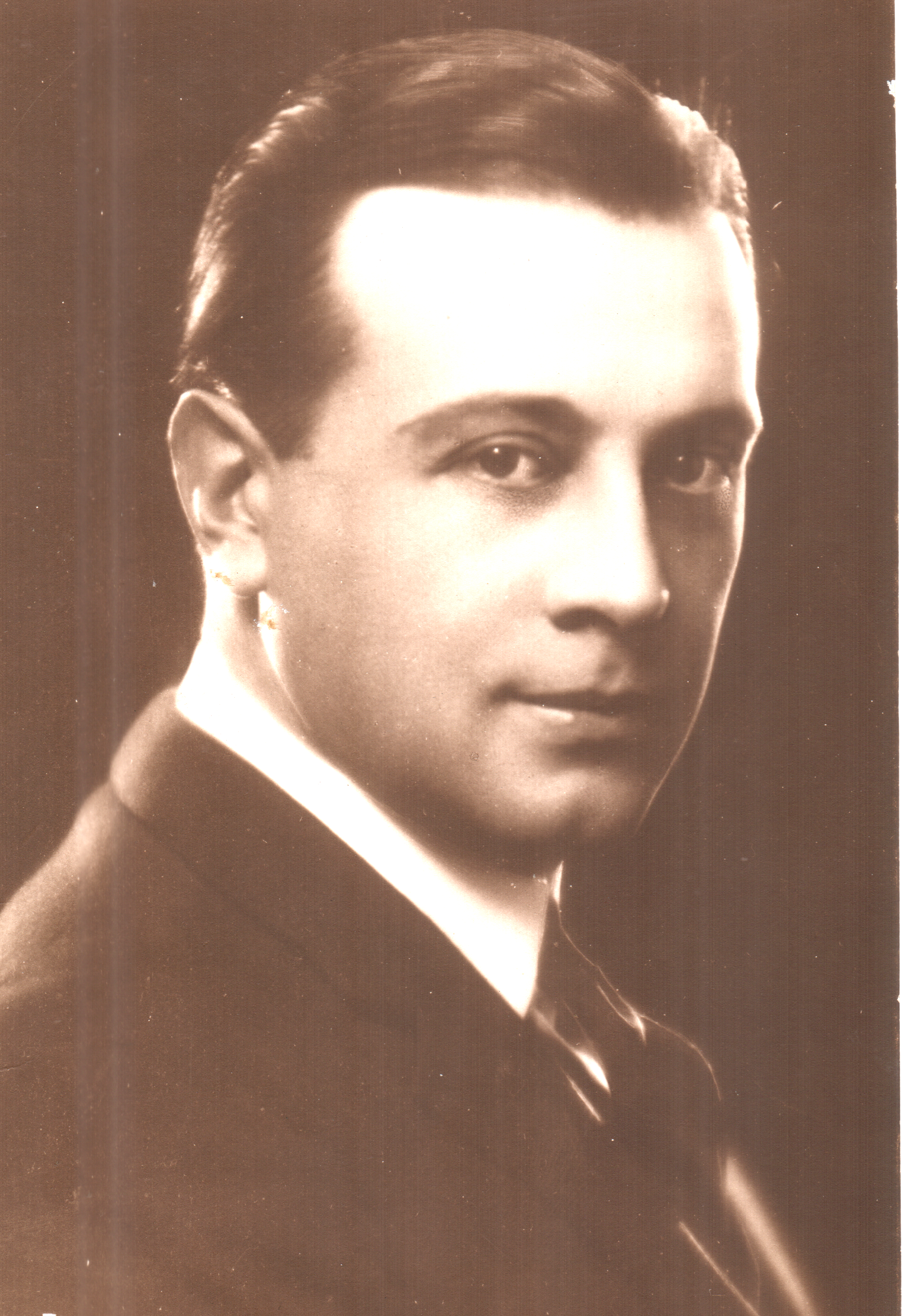
(Germany) Iván Petrovich

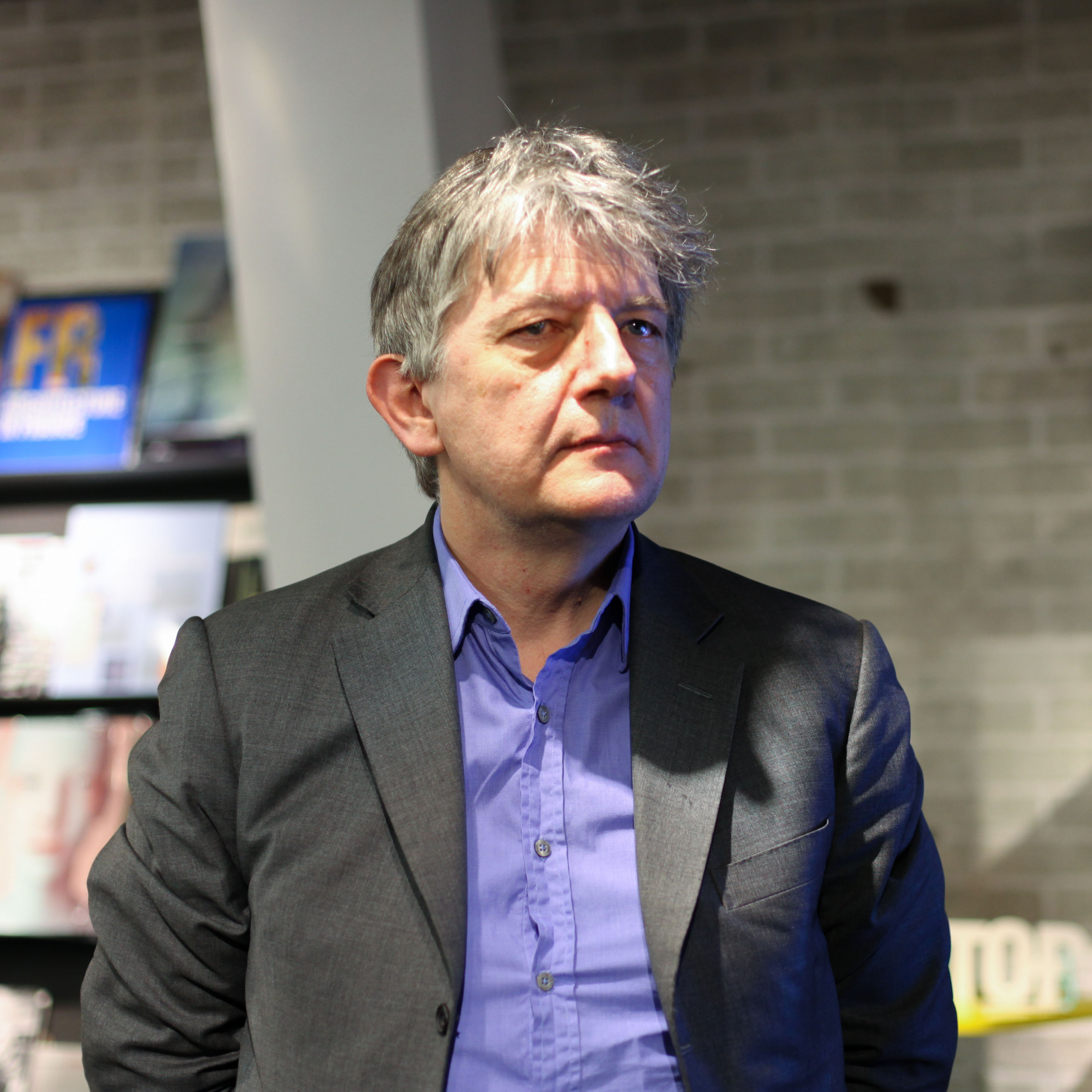
(United Kingdom) Deyan Sudjic

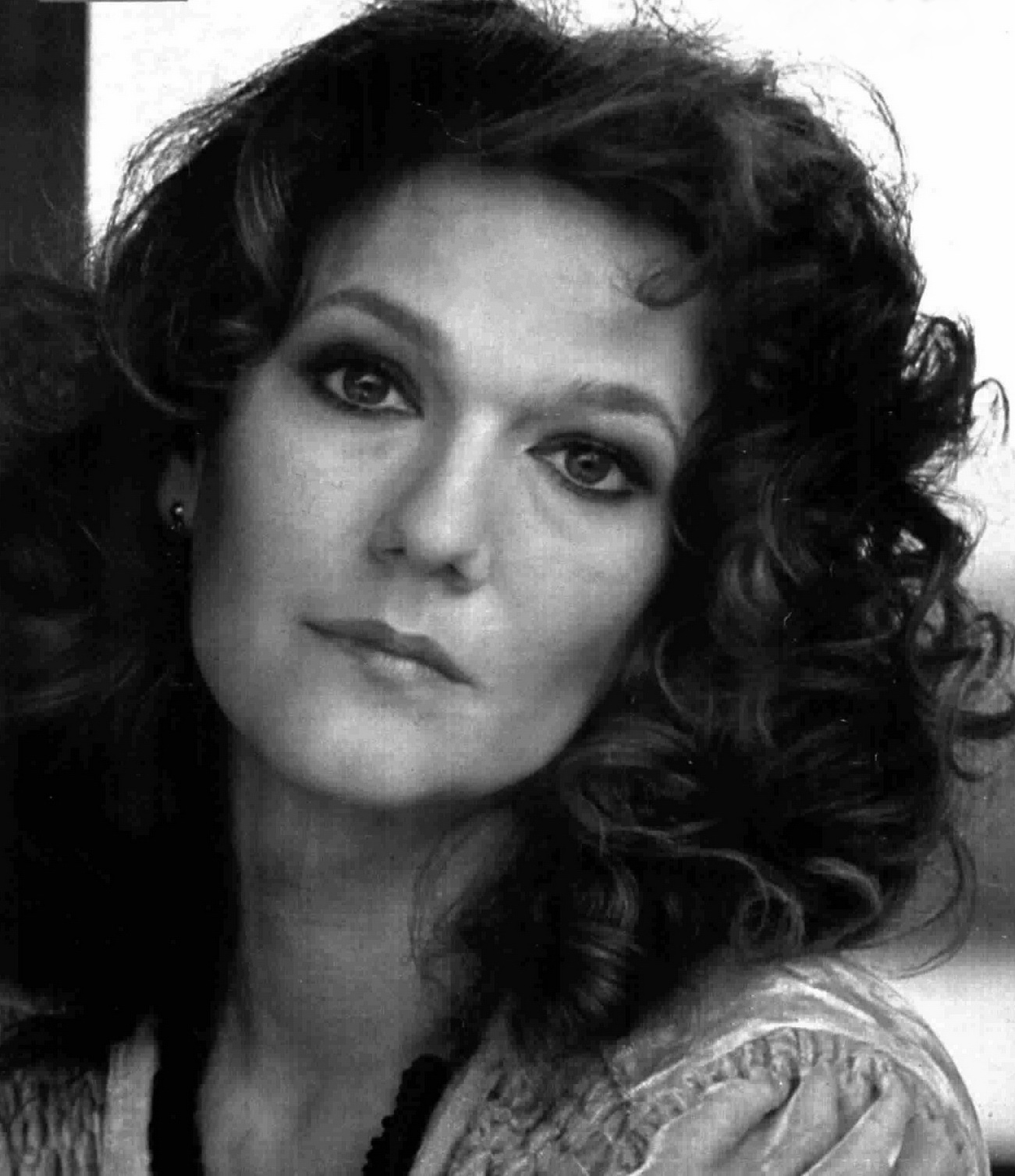
(Italy) Rada Rassimov

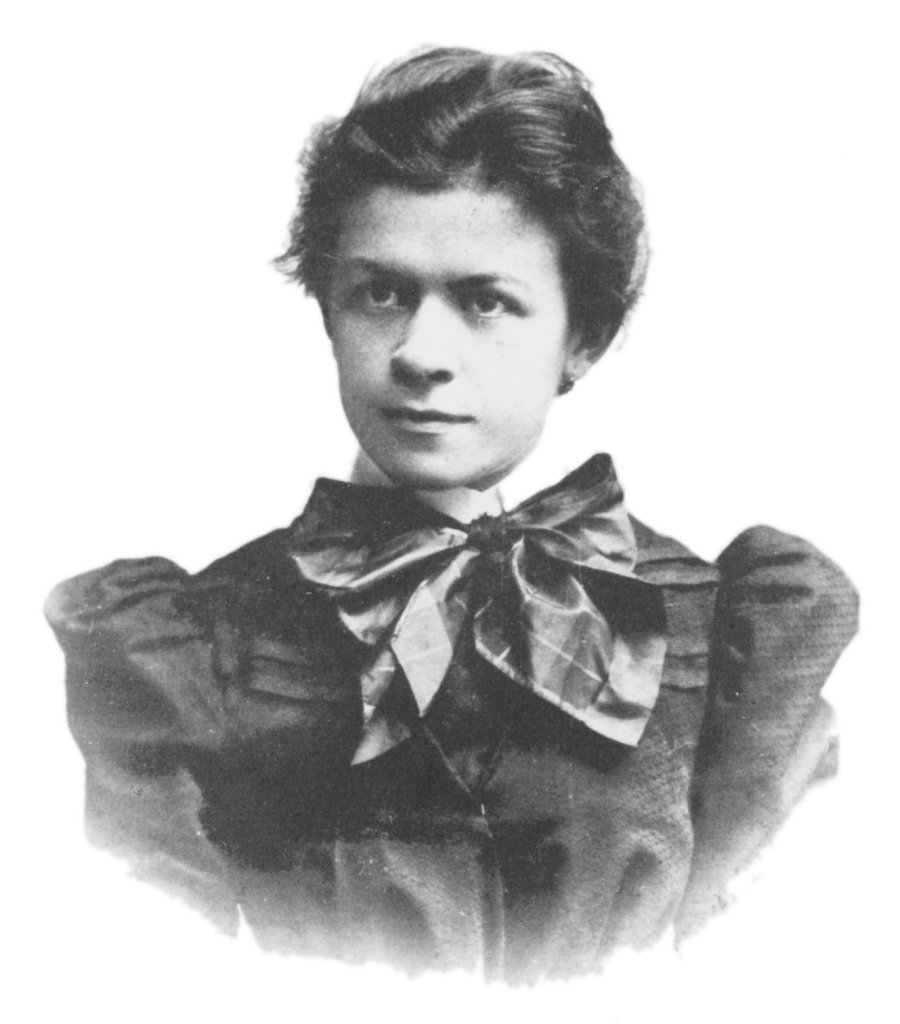
(Switzerland) Mileva Marić

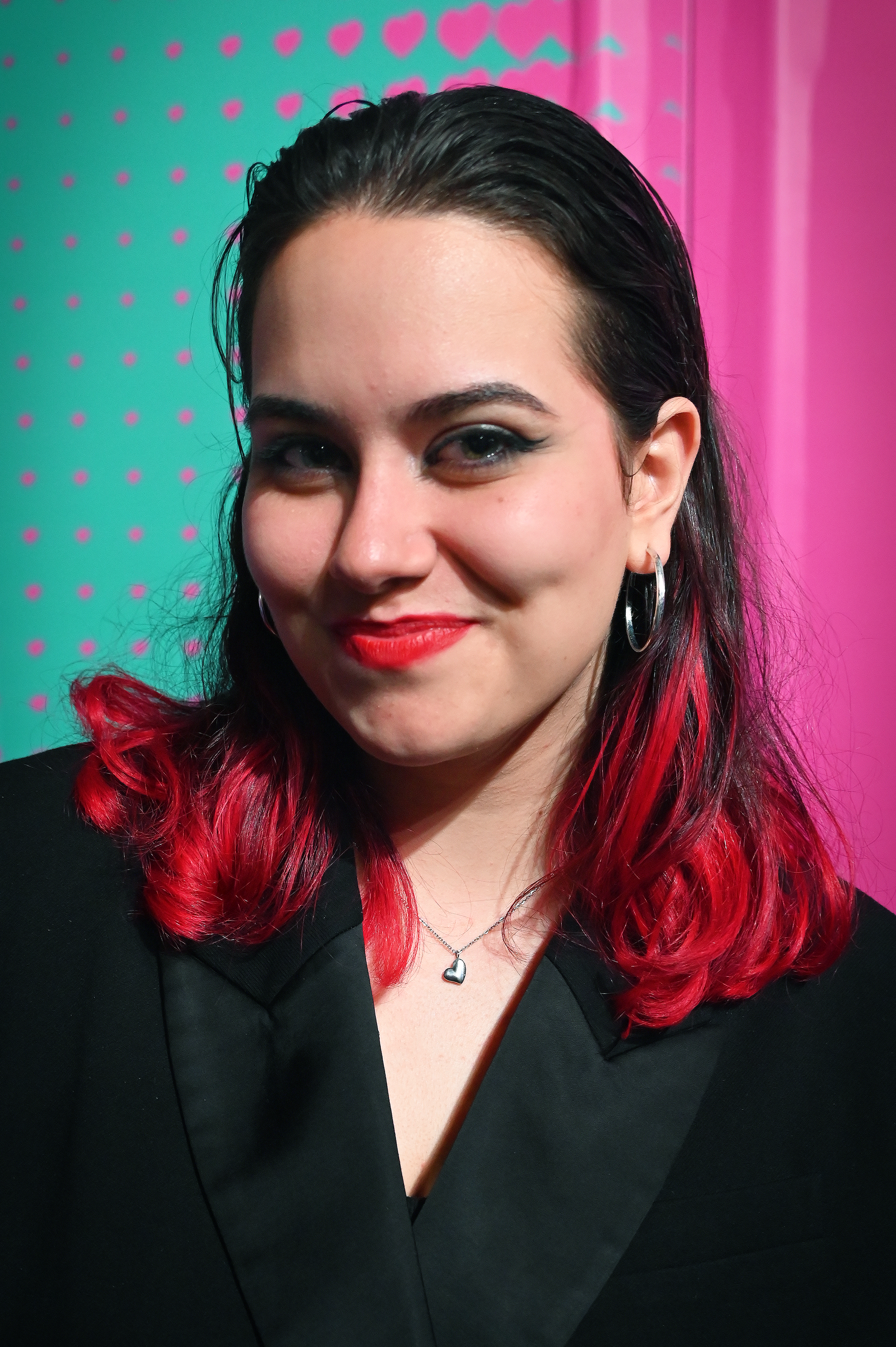
(Austria) Teya

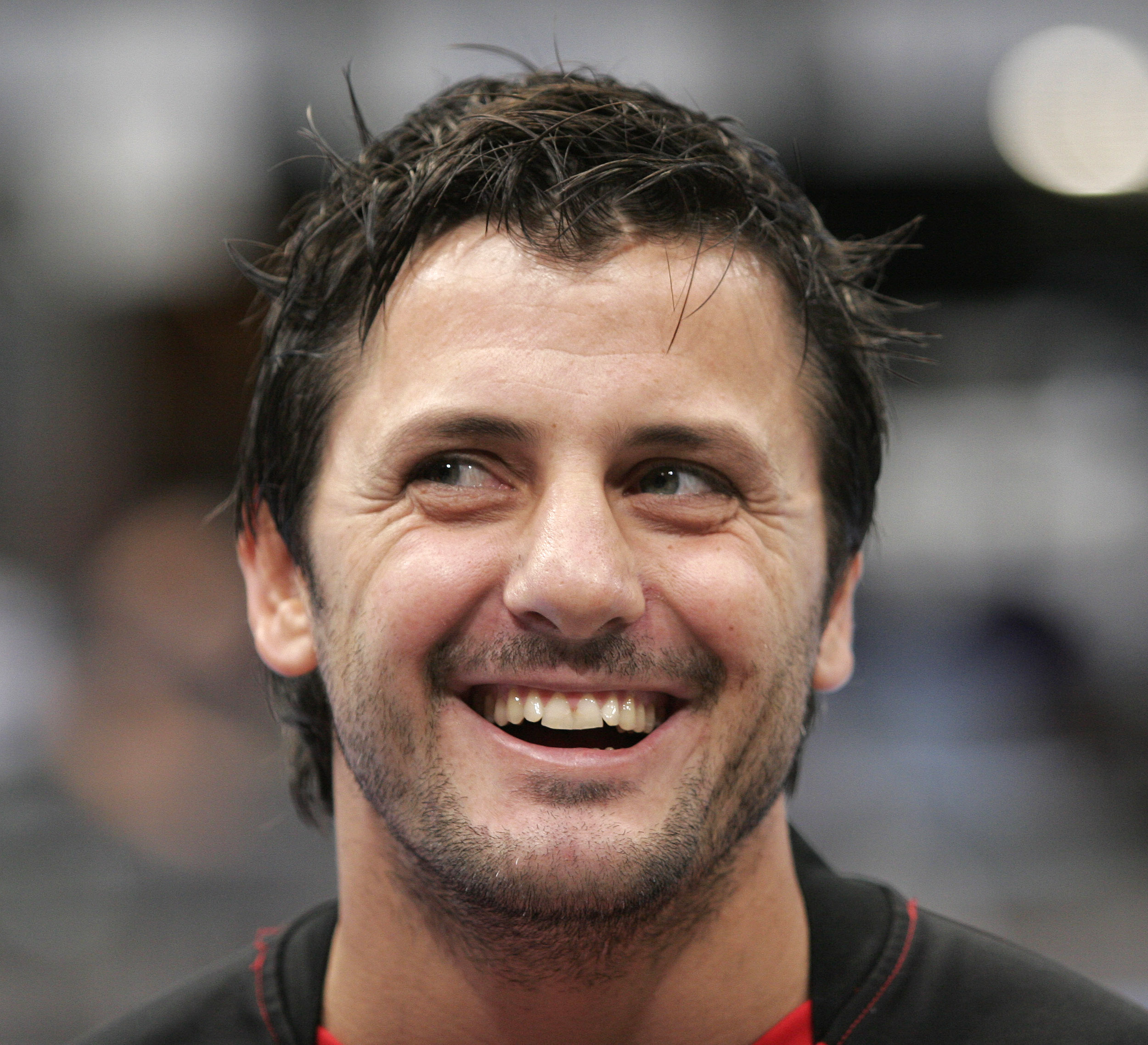
(Sweden) Ljubomir Vranjes

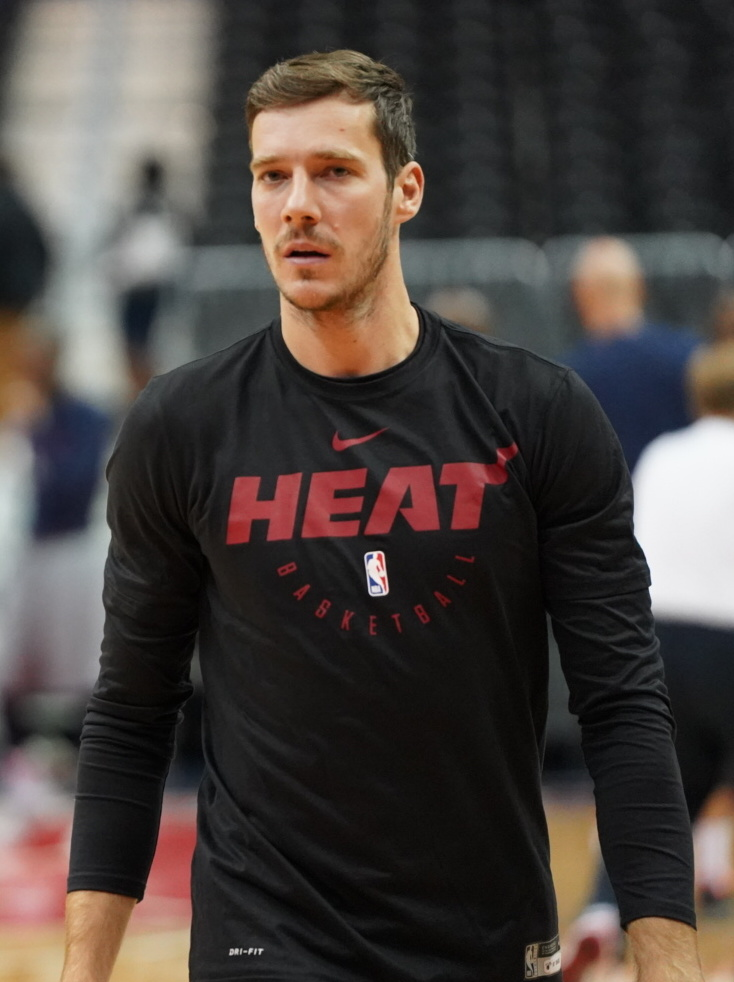
(Slovenia) Goran Dragić

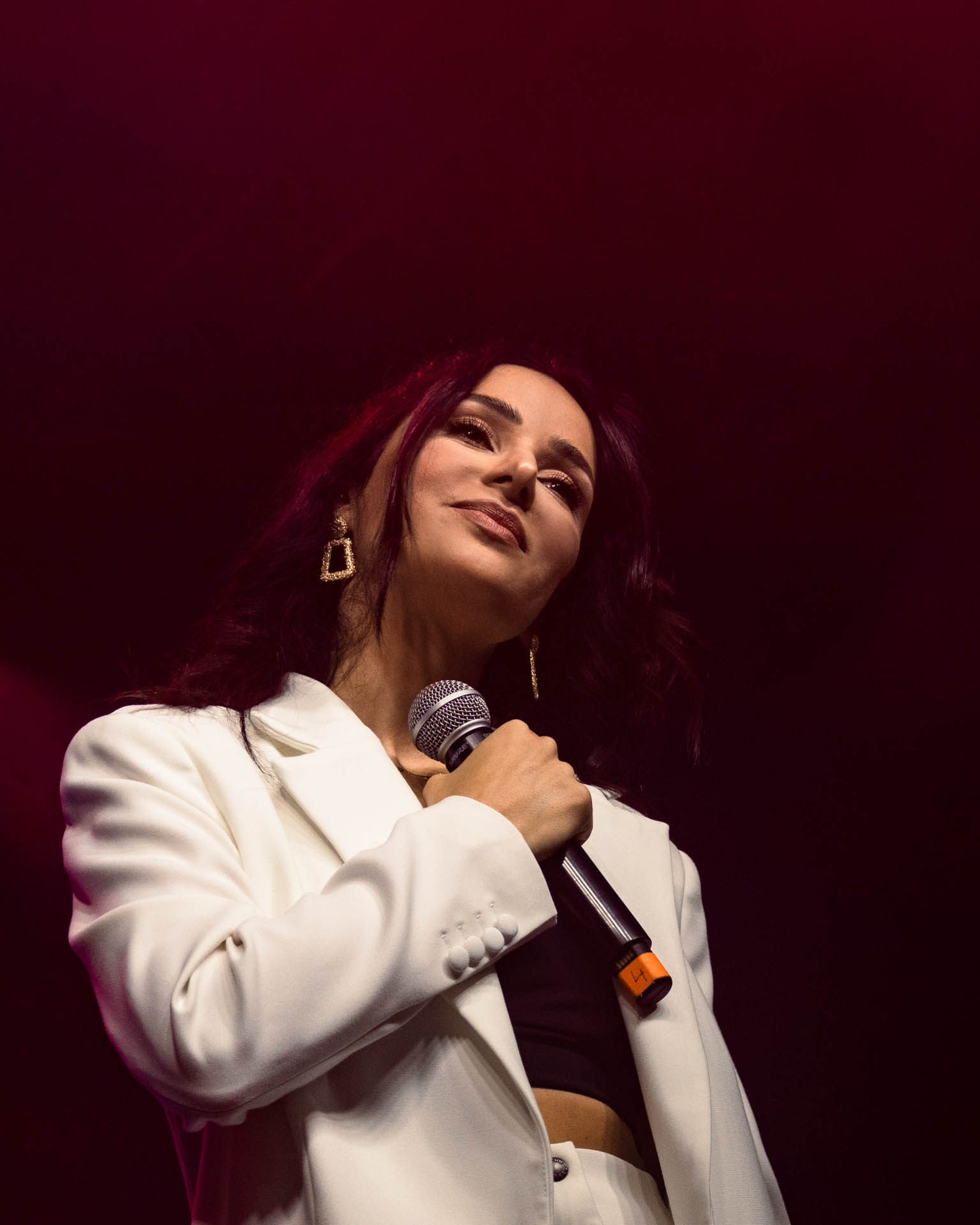
(Ukraine) Zlata Ognevich

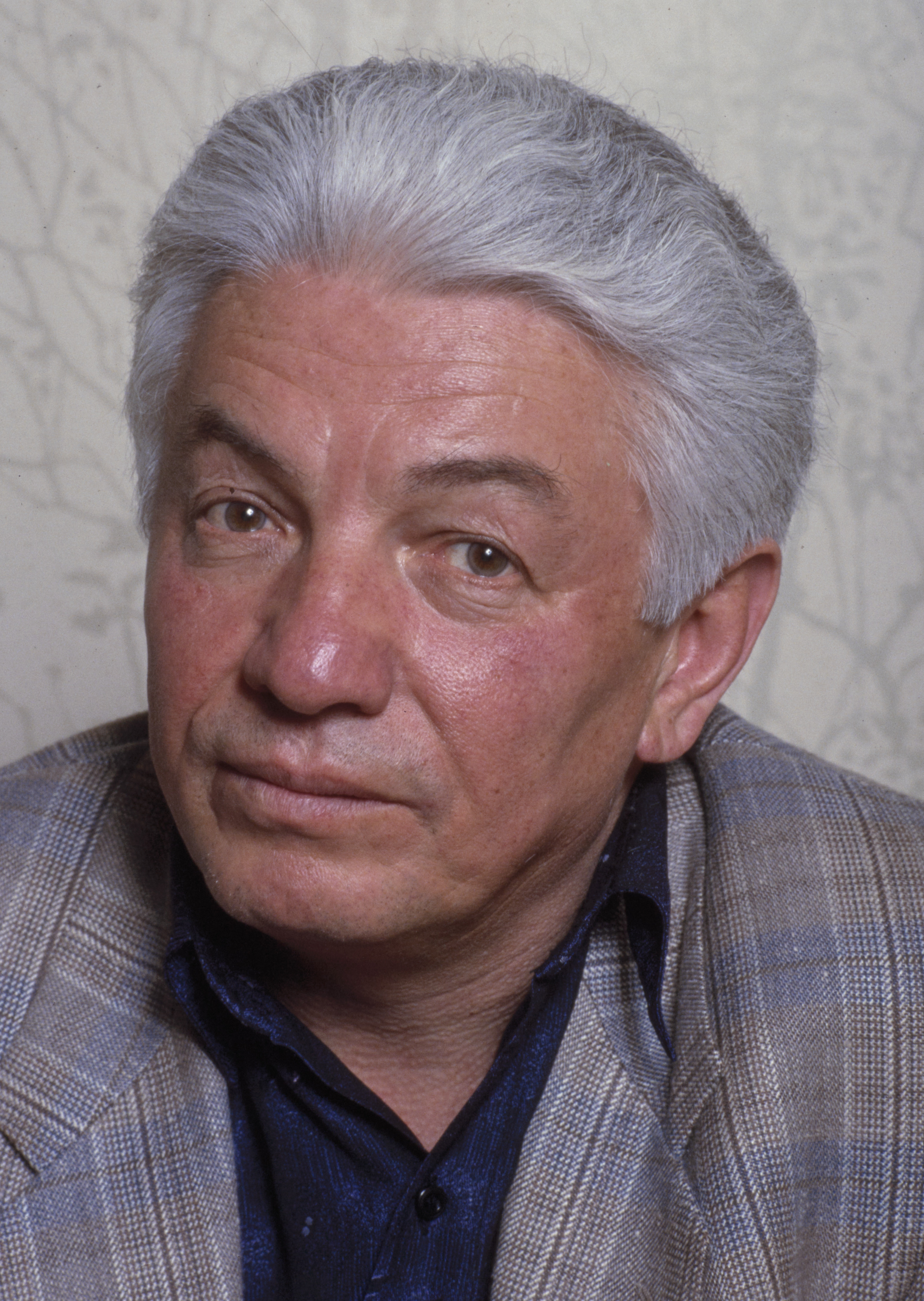
(Russia) Vladimir Voinovich

== See also ==
- Directorate for Cooperation with the Diaspora and Serbs in the Region

== Sources ==
- Marković, Predrag J. (2 October 2019). "Пламени круг српске културе". Politika Online. Politika.
- "4. Migrant Communities/Diasporas", Migration in Serbia: A Country Profile 2008 (PDF), International Organisation for Migration (IOM), October 2008, archived from the original (PDF) on 2020-08-14
- Peric, Dimso (1996), Srpska pravoslavna crkva i njena dijaspora [The Serbian Orthodox Church and Its Diaspora], Belgrade, Serbia
