= Serbs in South Africa =

Срби у Јужној Африци Srbi u Južnoj Africi

Total population
- ~20,000 (est.)

Regions with significant populations
- Johannesburg

Languages
- English, Afrikaans, and Serbian

Religion
- Eastern Orthodoxy (Serbian Orthodox Church)

Related ethnic groups
- White South African

Serbs in South Africa are South African citizens of ethnic Serb descent and/or Serbia-born persons living in South Africa.

== History ==
Mass immigration from the Balkans started at the end of the 19th century, when the diamond mines were opened in South Africa. The most common reason for leaving their homelands was to avoid military service in "foreign armies", as well as the desire to start a better life in this land of gold and diamonds. In the mid-1870s, when the first mine was opened in Kimberley, a certain number of Serbs from Dalmatia and the Bay of Kotor immigrated to South Africa. They settled mainly in the area around today's Johannesburg.

At the beginning of the 20th century, there were Serbs from Dalmatia, Lika, Herzegovina, and especially the Bay of Kotor, registered as citizens of Austria-Hungary.

After the Boer War in 1902, the second phase of immigration began. Thus, the 1904 South African census registered 2,288 citizens who had come from Austria-Hungary, Montenegro, and Serbia. Among the countries that offered labor to South Africa was the Kingdom of Serbia, while Austria-Hungary offered to the mining companies as many as 30,000 workers from Dalmatia, Herzegovina, and the Bay of Kotor. Besides work, another motive for people to immigrate to South Africa was to reunite families, as the first generation of immigrants consisted mainly of men.

The Kingdom of Yugoslavia did not give too much attention to the community of South Slavs in the Union of South Africa. The state did not send teachers, priests, or financial assistance to local associations, such was the case with communities in North America and South America. In 1941, the local community was in chaotic situation. In 1942, the Royal Yugoslav Army sent agents on a mission to Cape Town to recruit local male civilians of Yugoslav descent to help with the war effort.

When the World War II began, the Consulate-General of the Kingdom of Yugoslavia was opened in Johannesburg. In diplomatic dispatches to the government in Belgrade, it was emphasized that the majority of immigrants had no passports, no contact with Yugoslav state authorities, and no records. Therefore, when it came to the number of Yugoslav immigrants, it was assumed that there were 1,800 in Johannesburg, 50 in Pretoria, 40 in Cape Town, 30 in Scottburgh, 20 in Durban, and 300 of them were conscripts. These were the first official data on Yugoslav immigrants in the Union of South Africa in 1941. After the occupation of Yugoslavia, a group of members of the Yugoslav government-in-exile, as well as a group of refugees from Yugoslavia, arrived in Durban and Cape Town, 142 of them in total. At a reception organized for them by the Consulate-General, they were welcomed by some 300 Serb immigrants.

A new wave of immigration began after the World War II, when a group of officers, non-commissioned officers and prisoners of war of the Royal Yugoslav Army decided not to return to then-communist Yugoslavia.

In 1952 Serbian community that left Socialist Federative Republic of Yugoslavia after the World War II built Serbian Orthodox Church dedicated to Saint Sava and established Serbian language school, both located in Johannesburg.

In 1962, famous Serbian writer Miloš Crnjanski first published his work Lament over Belgrade in Johannesburg.

When the United Nations imposed sanctions on South Africa in 1963, Yugoslavia closed the Consulate-General, the Serb as well as other South Slavic communities were pushed into oblivion. However, immigration accelerated, and there were many Serbs among the economic immigrants from Yugoslavia. According to some estimate, the Yugoslav community grew from 1960s to late 1980s to 20,000, of whom 8,000 were Serbs.

In 1978, Serbian Orthodox Church dedicated to Thomas the Apostle was built in Johannesburg.

The last wave of Serbian immigration to South Africa occurred during the 1990s. The Yugoslav Wars and the economic crisis have driven as many as 4,000 immigrants to South Africa, the largest number of whom were Serbs from Bosnia and Herzegovina. During the 1999 NATO bombing of Yugoslavia, Serbs in South Africa staged demonstrations in Cape Town, Johannesburg, and Pretoria.

In 2013, the local Serbian Orthodox Church dedicated to the Presentation of Jesus in Johannesburg organized festivities for the Serbia's Statehood Day where 22 folklore groups took part in presentation of Serbian folklore.

Nowadays, Serbian language school in Johannesburg teach students Serbian language with support and under the program defined by Ministry of Education of Serbia. Following Serb community organizations and establishments are active in South Africa: Serb Club "Zavičaj", Church and School Municipality Saint Sava, Serb Cultural and Artistic Society "Africa", and Association "Serb Unity".

== Notable people ==
- Branko Brkic – editor and publisher
- Jovan Rebula – golfer, paternal Serb descent

== See also ==
- Immigration to South Africa
- White South Africans
- Serb diaspora
- Serbia–South Africa relations
