= Serbs in Poland =

Serbowie w Polsce Срби у Пољској Srbi u Poljskoj

Total population
- 1,149 (2021)

Regions with significant populations
- Warsaw

Languages
- Polish and Serbian

Religion
- Eastern Orthodoxy

Related ethnic groups
- Serbs in the Czech Republic, Serbs in Slovakia

Serbs in Poland are Polish citizens of ethnic Serb descent and/or Serbia-born persons living in Poland. According to data from 2021 census, there were 1,149 ethnic Serbs citizens in Poland.

== History ==
Serbs did not constitute a large community in Poland, however, their presence is attested in early modern times, when they lived in the then border town of Mohylów Podolski. According to the 1897 census, the largest Serbian populations in the Russian Partition of Poland lived in Warsaw (72), Nasielsk (46) and Będzin County (20), with very few in other locations.

According to the 1921 Polish census, main concentrations of Serbs included Lublin (29) and Warsaw (16).

== Notable people ==
- Draginja Nadaždin – human rights activist
- Miroslav Radović – football player
- Aleksandar Vuković – football coach
- Aleksandar Milićević – actor
- Andreja Prokić – football player
- Jovan Ninković – football player

== See also ==
- Immigration to Poland
- Serb diaspora
- Poland–Serbia relations
- Poles in Serbia
