= Nikolić =

Nikolić (Serbian Cyrillic: Hиколић), meaning "son of Nikola", is a common South Slavic surname and is found in Bosnia and Herzegovina, Croatia, Montenegro, Austria and Serbia. Nikolić is the third most frequent surname in Serbia, and is also common in Croatia, with 6,353 carriers (2011 census).

It may refer to the following people:

- Aleksandar Nikolić (1924–2000), Serbian basketball player and coach
- Aleksandra Nikolić (born 1990), Serbian fashion model
- Ana Nikolić (born 1978), Serbian singer
- Andrew Nikolic (born 1961), Australian politician, retired Australian Army brigadier
- Boris Nikolić (1974–2008), Serbian fashion designer
- Cleopatra Zvezdana Nikolic (stage name Cleo Sol, born 1990), British singer-songwriter
- Dragan Nikolić (1943–2016), Serbian actor
- Jelena Nikolić (born 1982), Serbian volleyball player
- Maja Nikolić (born 1975), Serbian singer
- Marijan Nikolić (born 1981), Croatian footballer
- Marko Nikolić (disambiguation), several people
- Maša Nikolić (born 2010), Serbian rhythmic gymnast
- Milan Nikolić (born 1979), Serbian accordionist
- Milan Nikolić (born 1987), Serbian footballer
- Milijana Nikolic (born 1975), Serbian opera soprano
- Milorad Nikolić (1920–2006), Serbian footballer
- Miloš Nikolić (disambiguation), several people
  - Millosh Gjergj Nikolla (born as Miloš Nikolić; 1911–1938), Albanian poet
- Momir Nikolić (born 1955), Bosnian Serbian former Assistant Chief of Security and Intelligence for the Bosnian Serb Army
- Nebojša Nikolić (born 1968), Bosnian chess master
- Nemanja Nikolić (disambiguation), several people
- Nenad Nikolić (disambiguation), several people
- Predrag Nikolić (born 1960), Bosnian chess grandmaster
- Siniša Nikolić (born 1967), Yugoslav footballer
- Sladjan Nikolic (born 1974), Serbian football manager and former midfielder
- Stefan Nikolić (disambiguation), several people
- Stevo Nikolić (born 1984), Bosnian Serb footballer
- Stojan "Niki" Nikolic (born 1949), former Yugoslav-American soccer defender
- Tomislav Nikolić (born 1952), former president of Serbia
- Uroš Nikolić (born 1987), Serbian basketball player
- Uroš Nikolić (born 1993), Serbian football midfielder
- Veljko Nikolić (born 1999), Serbian footballer
- Vera Nikolić (1948–2021), Serbian track and field athlete
- Vera Nikolić Podrinska (1886–1972), Croatian painter and baroness
- Vinko Nikolić (1912–1997), Croatian writer and journalist
- Vito Nikolić (1934–1994), Montenegrin poet
- Zoran M. Nikolić (born 1967), Serbian politician

Other

- House of Nikolić, Serbian noble house
