= Miloš Nikolić =

Miloš Nikolić may refer to:

- Miloš M. Nikolić, Professor at the University of Belgrade
- Miloš Nikolić (footballer, born 1987), Serbian association football defender
- Miloš Nikolić (footballer, born 1989), Serbian association football defender
- Miloš Nikolić (footballer, born 1994), Serbian association football defender
