= Serbs =

South Slavic ethnic group

Срби Srbi

Total population
- c. 9 million (Note: The figure represents the approximate sum of all the referenced populations.)

Regions with significant populations
- Serbia 5,360,239 (2022) (Note: The figure is considered an underestimation. In the 2022 census, 136,198 respondents chose not to declare their ethnicity (the question being voluntary), while an additional 322,013 individuals were recorded under the "Unknown" ethnic classification, covering residents whose data were taken from administrative registers rather than direct responses. The majority of both groups are estimated to be ethnic Serbs, as indicated by the ethnic breakdown of those who declared their ethnicity.); Bosnia-Herzegovina 1,086,733 (2013)
- Other regions
- Germany: 387,000 (2023 est.)
- Austria: 300,000 (2025 est.)
- Montenegro: 205,370 (2023)
- United States: 169,227 (2025)
- Croatia: 123,892 (2021)
- France: 120,000 (2008 est.)
- Switzerland: 120,000 (2008 est.)
- Kosovo: 95,000 (2023 est.)
- Australia: 94,997 (2021)
- Canada: 93,360 (2021)
- Sweden: 80,000 (2008 est.)
- United Kingdom: 70,000 (2001 est.)
- Slovenia: 38,964 (2002)
- Italy: 29,679 (2024)
- North Macedonia: 23,847 (2021)
- Netherlands: 20,297 (2024)
- South Africa: 20,000 (2014 est.)
- Romania: 12,026 (2021)
- Hungary: 11,622 (2022)
- Norway: 8,964 (2025)
- Malta: 5,935 (2021)
- Argentina: 5,000 (2008 est.)
- Belgium: 4,151 (2021)
- Czech Republic: 4,101 (2021)
- Denmark: 3,949 (2024)
- Spain: 3,943 (2022)
- Greece: 2,456 (2021)
- Russia: 2,151 (2020)
- Slovakia: 1,876 (2021)
- New Zealand: 1,347 (2023)
- Luxembourg: 1,218 (2021)
- Poland: 1,149 (2021)
- Cyprus: 1,009 (2011)

Languages
- Serbian

Religion
- Predominantly Eastern Orthodoxy (Serbian Orthodox Church)

Related ethnic groups
- Other South Slavs

Serbs (/sɜːb/; Serbian: Срби, Srbi, pronounced [sr̩̂bi]), are a South Slavic ethnic group and nation who share a common Serbian ancestry, culture, history, and language. They live primarily in their nation-state of Serbia, and in neighboring Bosnia and Herzegovina, Montenegro, Croatia, and Kosovo, with smaller communities in North Macedonia, Romania, and Hungary, while also constituting a significant diaspora with communities across Europe, the Americas, and Oceania.

Serbs are predominantly Eastern Orthodox Christians, traditionally affiliated with the Serbian Orthodox Church, and speak the Serbian language, which is official in Serbia, co-official in Bosnia-Herzegovina and Kosovo, and the most widely spoken language in Montenegro.

== Etymology ==
The origin of the ethnonym *Sŕbъ (plur. *Sŕby) is unclear. The most prominent theory holds that it is of Proto-Slavic origin, meaning "family kinship" or "alliance". Word *srъb- / *sьrb- roots in Slavic words meaning "to sip, munch", found in Polish s(i)erbać, Russian serbat', and also cognates in non-Slavic languages, such as Lithuanian suřbti, Middle German sürfen, which all derive from Indo-European onomatopoeic roots *serbh- / *sirbh- / *surbh- meaning "to sip, to breast-feed, to flow". Thus the basis of the ethnonym lies in "milk kinship" and "brotherhood in milk" which was widespread in early ethnic groups (between both relatives and non-relatives) and thus carried the secondary meanings of "those who belong to the same family, kinsman"; "member of the same kin, tribe"; and, finally, an ethnonym.

The earliest mention of the ethnonym Serb occurred in the 2nd century AD by Ptolemy describing an Illyrian tribe named Serboi (Σέρβοι) and mentions the town of Serbinum (Σέρβινον), who lived around present-day central Balkans, some authors considers it of Indo-Iranian Scytho-Sarmatian origin. The earliest mention of the Serbs in the Middle Ages are from 7th-century Chronicle of Fredegar, which describes Dervan as "the duke of the Serb people, who are of Slavic descent" (Latin: Dervanus dux gente Surbiorum, que ex genere Sclavinorum erant), and Einhard's Royal Frankish Annals, written in the 8th and 9th centuries, which mention "the Serbs, a people that is said to hold a large part of Dalmatia" (ad Sorabos, quae natio magnam Dalmatiae partem obtinere dicitur).

== Genetic origins ==
According to a three genetic systems – paternal, maternal, and autosomal – of available data from large-scale studies on Balto-Slavs and their proximal populations, the whole genome SNP data place Serbs in the middle between a Western South Slavic cluster (Croats, Bosniaks and Slovenes) and Eastern South Slavic cluster (Macedonians and Bulgarians). The western cluster has an inclination toward Hungarians, Czechs, and Slovaks, while the eastern cluster toward Romanians and, to some extent, Greeks.

Y chromosome results show that haplogroups I2a and R1a together account for the majority of the Serb makeup. Recent studies indicate that roughly half of Serbian I2a lineages trace their recent origin to Herzegovina/Old Herzegovina, reflecting strong historical gene flow from that region.

Mitochondrial DNA studies of Serbs show a predominantly Slavic maternal gene pool, with common U haplogroups shared with other Slavic populations. At the same time, a significant presence of Balkan-specific lineages and southern European lineages points to considerable genetic continuity with pre-Slavic Balkan populations. These findings support both the impact of early medieval Slavic migrations to the Balkans and a strong autochthonous substrate.

Based on the autosomal IBD survey, the speakers of Serbian share a very high number of common ancestors dated to the migration period approximately 1,500 years ago with Poland and Romania-Bulgaria cluster among others in Eastern Europe. It is concluded to be caused by the Hunnic and Slavic expansion, which was a "relatively small population that expanded over a large geographic area", particularly "the expansion of the Slavic populations into regions of low population density beginning in the sixth century," and that it is "highly coincident with the modern distribution of Slavic languages".

According to a 2023 archaeogenetic study using autosomal qpAdm modelling, the modern-day Serbs are 58.4% of Central-Eastern European early medieval Slavic ancestry, 39.2% local Balkan pre-Slavic, and 2.3% West Anatolian ancestry.

In recent decades, several anthropometric studies have confirmed that Serbia's people are among the tallest in the world, with an average male height of 1.82 metres (6 ft 0 in).

== History ==
=== Arrival of the Slavs ===
Early Slavs, especially Sclaveni and Antae, including the White Serbs, invaded and settled Southeastern Europe in the 6th and 7th century. Up until the late 560s, their activity consisted primarily of raiding across the Danube, although Slavic settlement remained limited and occurred mainly through Byzantine foederati colonies. The Danube and Sava frontier was overwhelmed by large-scale Slavic settlement in the late 6th and early 7th century. The area that is now central Serbia was an important geostrategic province through which the Via Militaris passed. The numerous Slavs mixed with and assimilated the descendants of the indigenous population Illyrians, Thracians, Dacians, as well as Romans and Celts. The White Serbs from White Serbia settled primarily in the region between the Dinaric Alps and the Adriatic coast, although during their migration some groups temporarily reached as far as the area near Thessaloniki (modern Servia). The region of Raška was the center of Serb settlement and Serb tribes also occupied most of modern-day Herzegovina and Montenegro.

=== Middle Ages ===
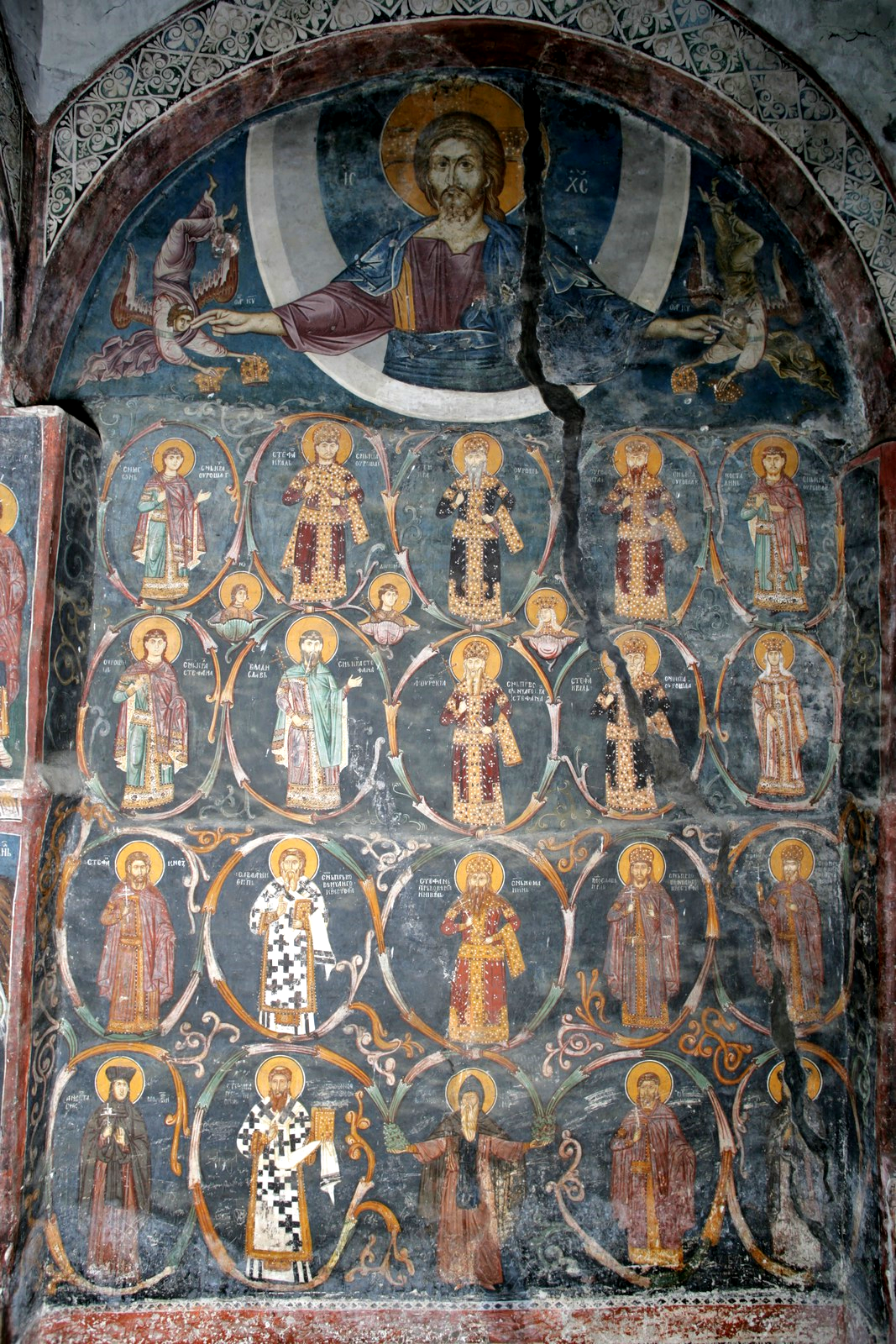
Medieval fresco from Serbian Orthodox Patriarchate of Peć monastery depicting the family tree of the Nemanjić dynasty, the leading dynasty of medieval Serbia

The first Serb states, Serbia (c. 780–960) and Duklja (10th century–1186/9), were formed chiefly under the Vlastimirović and Vojislavljević dynasties, respectively. The other Serb-inhabited lands, or principalities, that were mentioned included the "countries" of Zachlumia, Travunia, and Pagania. As the Serbian state of Duklja declined in the late 11th century, Raška gained independence and succeeded it as the most powerful Serbian state. Grand Prince Stefan Nemanja (r. 1166–96), founder of the Nemanjić dynasty which ruled Serbia until the 14th century, conquered the neighbouring regions of Kosovo, Duklja, and Zachlumia. Nemanja's older son, Stefan Nemanjić, became Serbia's first recognized king, while his younger son, Rastko, founded the Serbian Orthodox Church in the year 1219, and became known as Saint Sava.

Over the next 140 years, Serbia expanded its borders from numerous smaller principalities into a unified Serbian Empire. Its culture remained deeply Byzantine in character, despite political and military ambitions directed against Byzantine Empire itself. The medieval power and influence of Serbia culminated in the reign of Stefan Dušan (1331–1355), who proclaimed himself Emperor in 1346. At its height under his rule, the empire’s territory included Macedonia, northern Greece, Montenegro, and almost all of modern Albania.

Ottoman Turks began their conquest of the Balkans in the 1350s, sparking a major conflict with the Serbs. The first major battle was the Battle of Maritsa (1371), in which the Serbs were defeated. The deaths of two key Serbian commanders in the battle, followed by the death of Emperor Stefan Uroš V later that year, caused the Serbian Empire to fragment into several smaller domains. These states were ruled by regional lords: Zeta by the Balšić noble family; Raška, Kosovo, and northern Macedonia by the Branković noble family; and Prince Lazar Hrebeljanović, who controlled modern-day Central Serbia and parts of Kosovo. Because of his marriage to a member of the Nemanjić dynasty, Lazar was acknowledged as the titular leader of the Serbs. In 1389 the Serbs faced the Ottomans at the Battle of Kosovo on the plain of Kosovo Polje, near modern-day Pristina. Both Prince Lazar and Sultan Murad I were killed. The battle most likely ended in a stalemate, and Serbia thereafter enjoyed a period of relative prosperity under Despot Stefan Lazarević while resisting Ottoman conquest until 1459.

=== Early modern period ===
The Ottoman devshirme system was a form of slavery in which Christian boys from the Balkans, many of them Serbs, were taken from their families, forcibly converted to Islam, and trained for elite infantry units of the Ottoman army known as the Janissary corps. A number of Serbs who converted to Islam (either through the devshirme or later) rose to the highest ranks of the Ottoman Empire, including the Ottoman grand vizier Sokollu Mehmed Pasha and the field marshal and war minister Omar Pasha Latas.

The Serbs had taken an active part in the wars fought in the Balkans against the Ottoman Empire and had also organized numerous uprisings. Because of this, they suffered persecution and their territories were devastated, resulting in major migrations from Serbia into Habsburg territory. After allied Christian forces had captured Buda from the Ottoman Empire in 1686 during the Great Turkish War, Serbs from the Pannonian Plain (present-day Hungary, the Slavonia region in present-day Croatia, and the Bačka and Banat regions in present-day Serbia) joined the troops of the Habsburg monarchy as separate units known as the Serbian Militia. Serbs, as volunteers, massively joined the Austrian side.

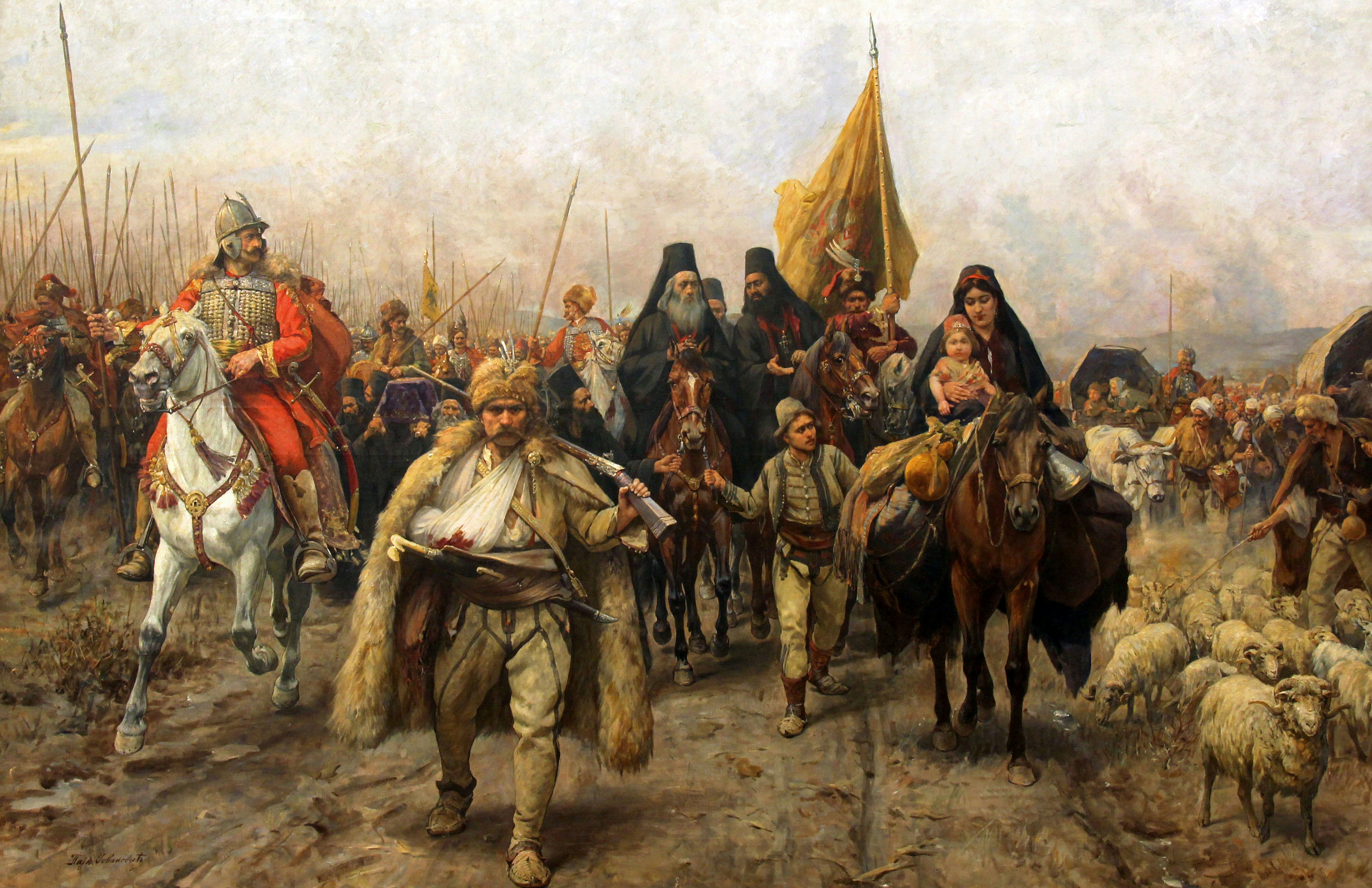
Great Migration of the Serbs were series of migration from Ottoman territories to the Habsburg monarchy at the end of the 17th century and the beginning of the 18th century

In 1688–1689 the Habsburg army, advancing deep into the Ottoman Balkans during the Great Turkish War, captured Belgrade and much of present-day Serbia, encouraging Serbs to rise against Ottoman rule. When the Habsburg offensive collapsed in 1690 and Ottoman forces began a brutal reconquest accompanied by reprisals against the rebel population, Serbian Patriarch Arsenije III Crnojević feared massacres and loss of church privileges. He therefore led in 1690 tens of thousands of Serb families (estimates range from 30,000 to 70,000 people) north across the Sava and Danube rivers into Habsburg territory in what became known as the Great Serb Migration. The large Serb community concentrated in the Banat, southern Hungary, and the Military Frontier consisted of merchants and craftsmen in the cities, but mainly of peasant refugees. Smaller groups of Serbs also migrated to the Russian Empire, and settled in the newly established frontier regions of Slavo-Serbia (1753–1764) and New Serbia (1752–1764), located in present-day eastern Ukraine, where they were granted land and military privileges to defend the empire’s southern borders.

=== Modern period ===
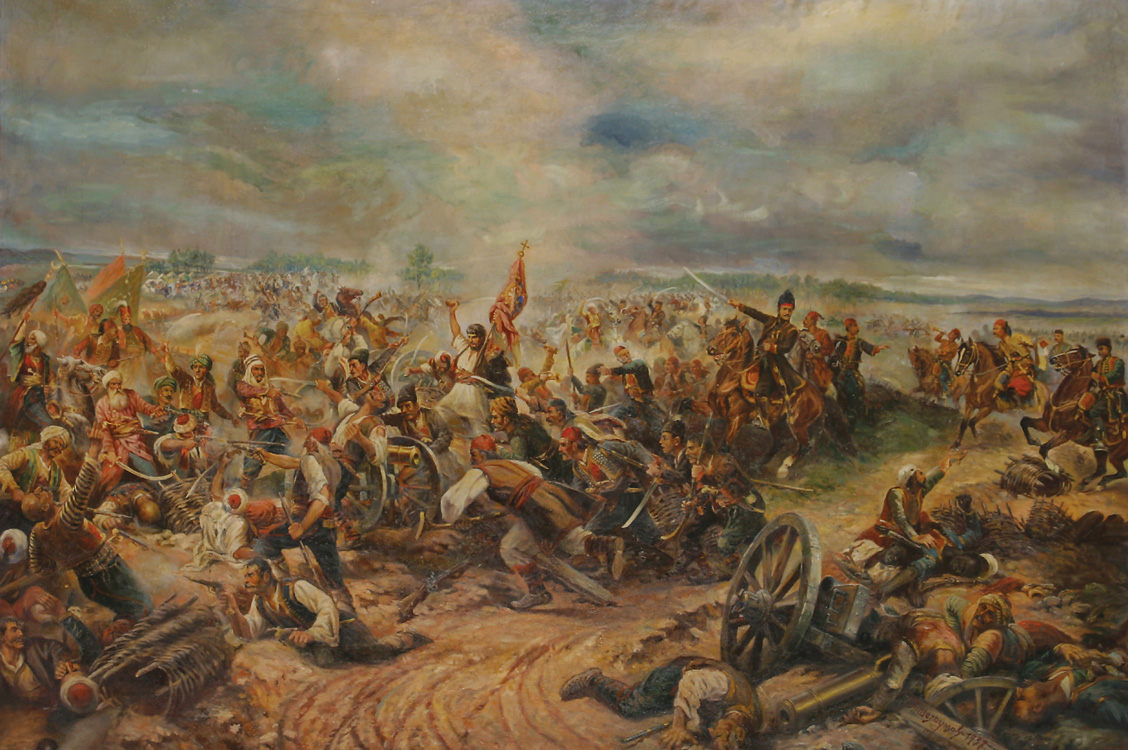
Battle of Mišar in 1806, major battle of the First Serbian Uprising

The Serbian Revolution (1804–1817) was the first successful national uprising against Ottoman rule in Europe and consisted of two phases: the First Serbian Uprising (1804–1813) led by Karađorđe Petrović, which created an independent Serbian state for almost a decade, and the shorter but decisive Second Serbian Uprising (1815–1817) led by Miloš Obrenović. During the First Uprising, the rebels established their own government, army, and institutions, effectively ending centuries of Ottoman feudal oppression. Although the Ottomans crushed the First Uprising in 1813, the Second Uprising forced the Sublime Porte to grant Serbia substantial autonomy in 1815–1816; in the early 1830s Serbia’s autonomy and borders were formally recognised with Miloš Obrenović acknowledged as hereditary prince, the last Ottoman troops withdrew in 1867, and full international recognition of independence finally came at the Congress of Berlin in 1878. The revolution not only laid the foundations of modern Serbia but also abolished feudalism early and inspired subsequent national movements across the Balkans. The revolution as a consequence also produced one of Europe’s earliest codified legal systems, the Serbian Civil Code of 1844, making Serbia the fourth modern-day European country, after France, Austria and the Netherlands, to have a codified legal system.

Serbia fought in the Balkan Wars of 1912–13, which forced the Ottomans out of the Balkans and doubled the territory and population of the Kingdom of Serbia. In 1914, a Bosnian Serb Gavrilo Princip assassinated Archduke Franz Ferdinand of Austria, provoking the outbreak of World War I. In the fighting that ensued, Serbia was invaded by Austria-Hungary. Despite being outnumbered, the Serbian Army defeated the Austro-Hungarian forces at the Battle of Cer, which marked the first Allied victory over the Central Powers in the war. Further victories at the battles of Kolubara and the Drina meant that Serbia remained unconquered as the war entered its second year. However, joint invasion by the forces of Germany, Austria-Hungary, and Bulgaria overwhelmed Serbia in the winter of 1915, and a subsequent withdrawal by the Serbian Army through Albania took the lives of more than 240,000 soldiers and civilians. Serbian Army spent the remaining years of the war fighting on the Macedonian front in Greece, before liberating Serbia from Austro-Hungarian occupation in 1918. Serbia suffered the biggest casualty rate in World War I.

Following the victory in World War I, the Serbs formed the Kingdom of Serbs, Croats, and Slovenes (later renamed Kingdom of Yugoslavia) together with other South Slavic peoples (except Bulgarians). The country was reigned over by the Serbian House of Karađorđević, most notably by King Alexander I from 1921 to 1934.

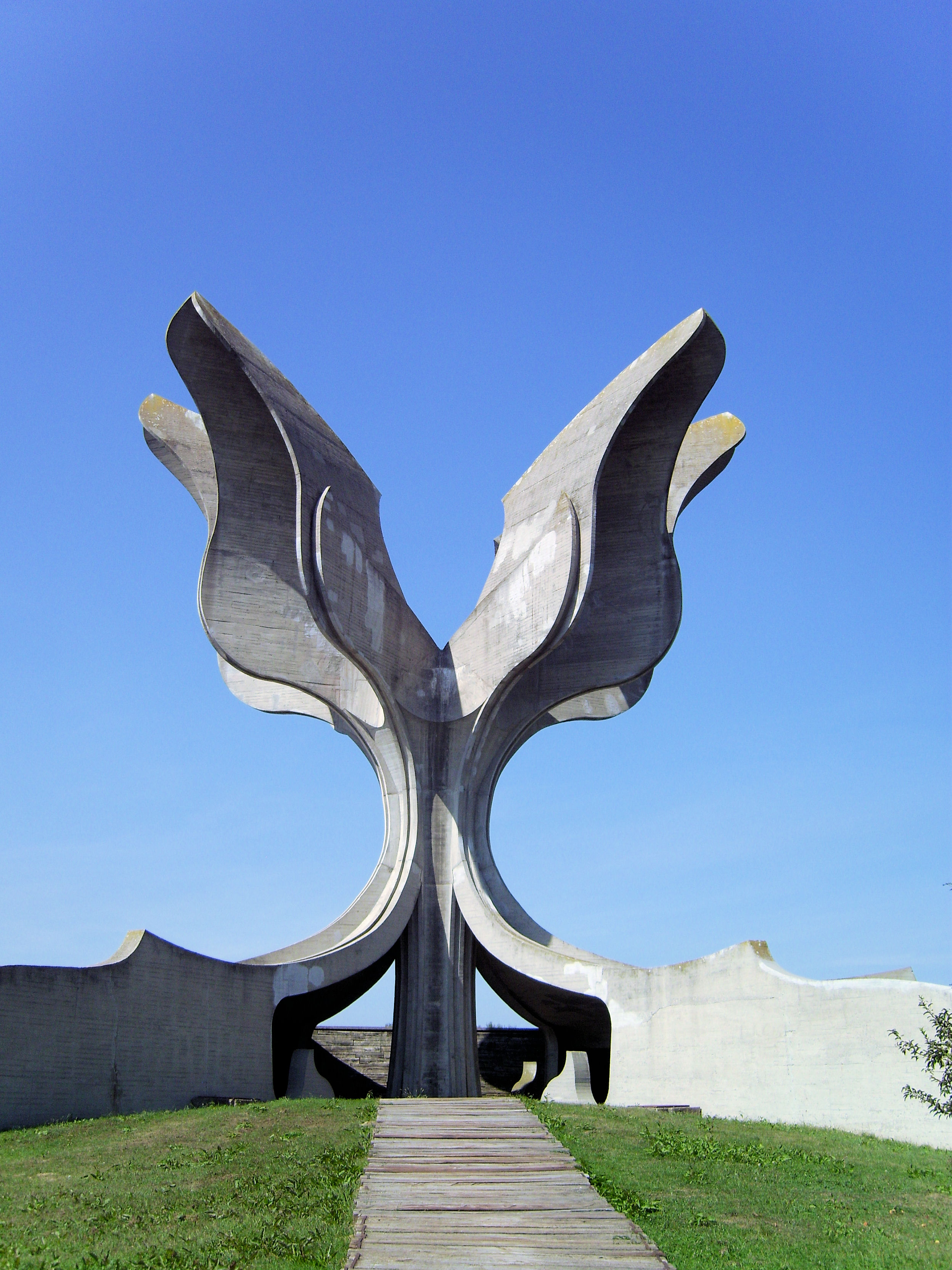
Stone Flower, a monument dedicated to the victims of Jasenovac concentration camp, a major site of the Genocide of Serbs during World War II

During World War II, Yugoslavia was invaded in 1941 by the Axis powers and subsequently divided, with Serbia placed under direct German occupation. Serbs in occupied Yugoslavia subsequently formed a resistance movement known as the Yugoslav Army in the Homeland, or the Chetniks. The Chetniks had the official support of the Allies until 1943, when Allied support shifted to the Communist Yugoslav Partisans, a multi-ethnic resistance movement, formed in 1941. Although Serbs constituted the majority of Yugoslav Partisan fighters in the first two years of the war, other ethnic groups joined in larger numbers after the Italian capitulation in 1943. Over the entire course of the war, the ethnic composition of the Yugoslav Partisans was approximately 53 percent Serb.

Serbs in the Independent State of Croatia were targeted for extermination as part of a genocide carried out by the Croatian fascist Ustaše regime and suffered among the highest casualty rates in Europe during World War II. The Ustaše view of ethnic and racial identity, as well as the theory of Serbs as an inferior race, was under the influence of Croatian nationalists and intellectuals from the end of the 19th and the beginning of the 20th century. Jasenovac concentration camp was notorious for the barbaric practices which occurred in it. Sisak and Jastrebarsko concentration camps were specially established for children. Humanitarian Diana Budisavljević carried out rescue operations and saved more than 15,000, mostly Serb, children, from Ustaše camps.

=== Contemporary period ===
At the end of the war, the Partisans, led by Josip Broz Tito, emerged victorious. They abolished the monarchy, and established the Federal People’s Republic of Yugoslavia (renamed Socialist Federal Republic of Yugoslavia in 1963) as a federation of six republics: Slovenia, Croatia, Bosnia and Herzegovina, Serbia, Montenegro, and Macedonia. Tito’s Yugoslavia pursued a unique path of "socialist self-management", broke with Stalin and the Soviet bloc in 1948, co-founded the Non-Aligned Movement, and maintained relative political independence and a higher standard of living than most communist countries, while suppressing nationalism and holding the multi-ethnic state together through the strength of the League of Communists of Yugoslavia and Tito's personal authority. After Tito's death in 1980, economic stagnation, rising debt, and resurgent ethnic nationalism weakened the federal system throughout the 1980s, setting the stage for the violent break-up of the country in the early 1990s.

Yugoslavia disintegrated in the early 1990s, triggering the Yugoslav Wars that ultimately produced five successor states. The most intense fighting took place in Croatia and Bosnia and Herzegovina, where parts of the Serb population, supported by Serbia, rebelled and proclaimed independent entities. The Croatian War of Independence ended in 1995 when Operation Storm, a Croatian military offensive, crushed the self-proclaimed Republic of Serbian Krajina, resulting in the exodus of 200,000 ethnic Serbs. The Bosnian War concluded the same year with the Dayton Agreement, which divided Bosnia and Herzegovina along ethnic lines into two entities (one of them being Serb entity, Republika Srpska). In 1998–1999, escalating conflict in Kosovo between Serbian security forces and the Kosovo Liberation Army seeking independence culminated in a 78-day NATO air campaign that forced the withdrawal of Serbian forces from the province, resulting in yet another exodus of ethnic Serbs. In 2008, Kosovo unilaterally declared independence, an act Serbia has never recognized.

== Demographics ==
Countries with significant Serb population + 1,000,000 + 100,000 + 10,000 + 1,000

Serbs are the titular people and largest ethnic group in Serbia, their nation-state, numbering 5.3 million and making up 80.6% of the population. The Serb population in countries and territories bordering Serbia is approximately 1.5 million, almost identical to the estimated 1.6 million Serbs living in the diaspora.

Serbs in the countries and territories bordering Serbia, commonly termed Срби у Региону / Srbi u Rеgionu (lit. "Serbs in the Region"), are not regarded as part of the Serb diaspora, since they constitute autochthonous communities that have the legal status of recognized ethnic minorities or, in Bosnia and Herzegovina, one of the constituent peoples. Serbs in Bosnia and Herzegovina and Serbs in Montenegro are the second-largest ethnic group in their respective countries and constitute about one-third of the population in each. Serbs in Croatia and Serbs in Kosovo are also the second-largest ethnic group, but their share of the population is relatively small (3% and 5%, respectively). Small ethnic Serb communities are to be found in North Macedonia, Romania, and Hungary.

Serb diaspora consist of ethnic Serbs and their descendants living predominantly in Europe and, to a much lesser extent, overseas. There is a particularly large Serb diaspora in German-speaking countries (Germany, Austria, and Switzerland), while significant overseas communities exist in the United States, Canada, and Australia. Serb emigration has occurred in several distinct and massive waves over the past century and a half. The first major wave began in the late 19th century and continued until the outbreak of the World War II. It was almost entirely economic in character and drew people from the poorest and most inaccessible regions: Herzegovina, Montenegro, Lika, Dalmatian Hinterland. The second wave was much smaller but politically sharp and took place immediately after the World War II, when the victory of Yugoslav Partisan forces forced tens of thousands of defeated soldiers (mainly members of the royalist Chetnik movement) to flee the new communist Yugoslavia to the United States, Canada, Australia, Argentina, and, to a lesser degree, the United Kingdom and France. By far the largest wave was the exodus that began in the mid-1960s and lasted until the late 1980s - this generation of diaspora is collectively known as gastarbajteri, after German gastarbeiter ("guest worker"), since most of the emigrants headed for German-speaking countries. The fourth wave, during the 1990s, was the most dramatic: the breakup of Yugoslavia and the subsequent Yugoslav Wars drove hundreds of thousands of Serbs from their homes in Croatia and Bosnia-Herzegovina. At the same time, the rump Yugoslavia (Serbia and Montenegro) suffered hyperinflation, international sanctions, economic collapse, and finally the NATO bombing of 1999. Many headed to Canada, Australia, and the traditional European destinations, but new countries such as Norway, Denmark, and even New Zealand, also appeared on the map of Serb emigration.

== Culture ==
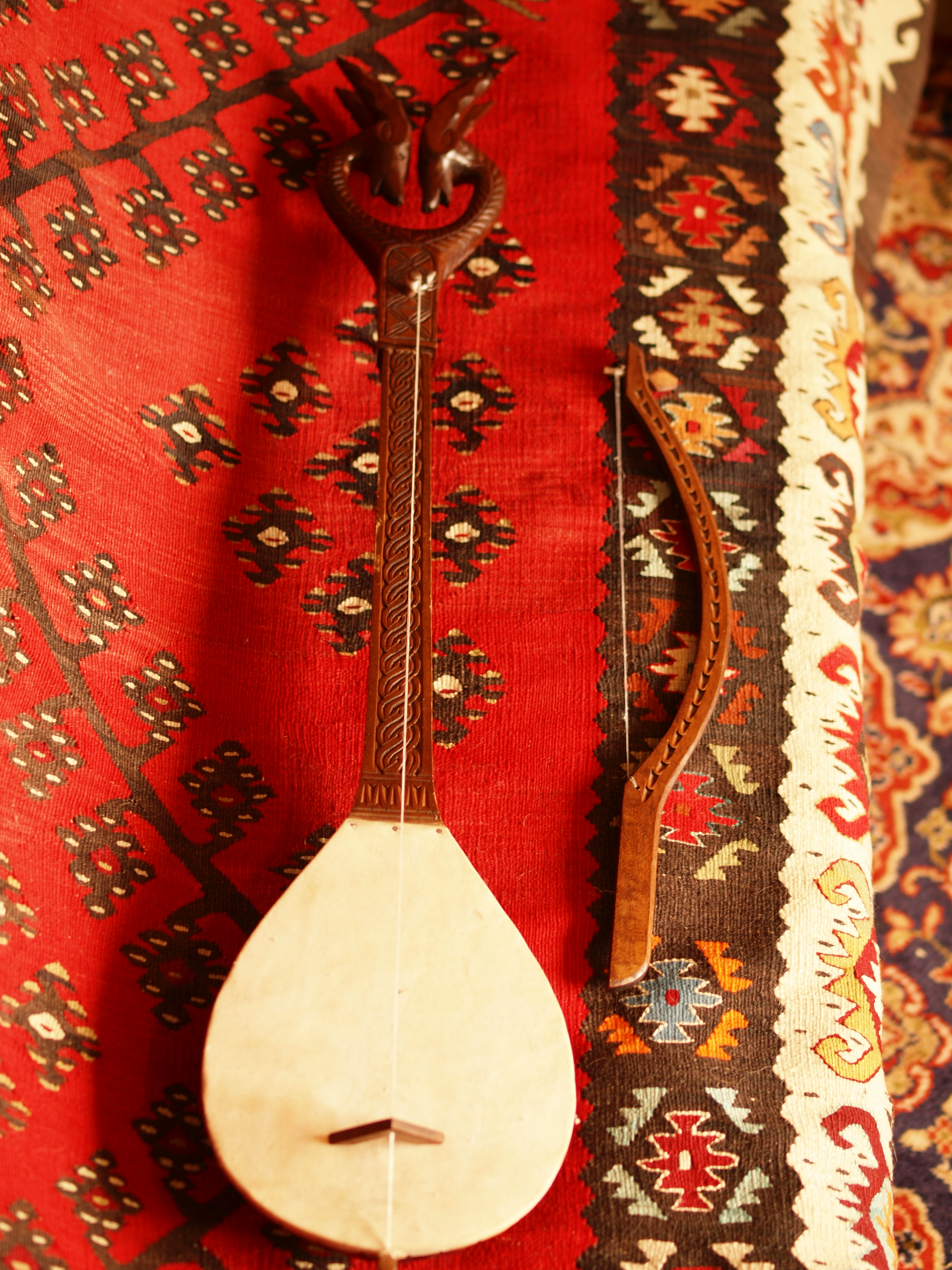
The gusle, Serbia’s national instrument, and the Pirot carpet, a traditional handicraft.

Serbs are renowned for their contributions to icon painting, literature, music, dance, and medieval architecture. Traditional Serbian visual arts (especially frescoes and icons) and ecclesiastical architecture are strongly influenced by Byzantine traditions, with additional Mediterranean and Western elements. Traditional folk music is rich and varied, with gusle as a national instrument. Gusle is a bowed single-stringed musical instrument (and musical style) always accompanied by singing. The gusle holds a central place in Serbian epic poetry, serving as the traditional accompanying instrument for a centuries-old oral tradition of patriotic songs. The vast majority of these epics centre on the Ottoman occupation and the Serbian struggle for liberation. Other instruments employed by traditional Serb folk music include flutes and trumpets.

The symbolical Kosovo Myth is a central Serbian national myth that has been a major theme in Serbian folklore and literary tradition, symbolizing martyrdom and the defense of Serbian homeland, and Christendom in general, against Ottoman Muslims.

A 2005 cross-cultural study published by the American Psychological Association, surveying nearly 17,000 individuals across 53 nations, found Serbia to have the highest level of national self-esteem of all countries surveyed, while also ranking among the ten most collectivist societies.

=== Religion ===
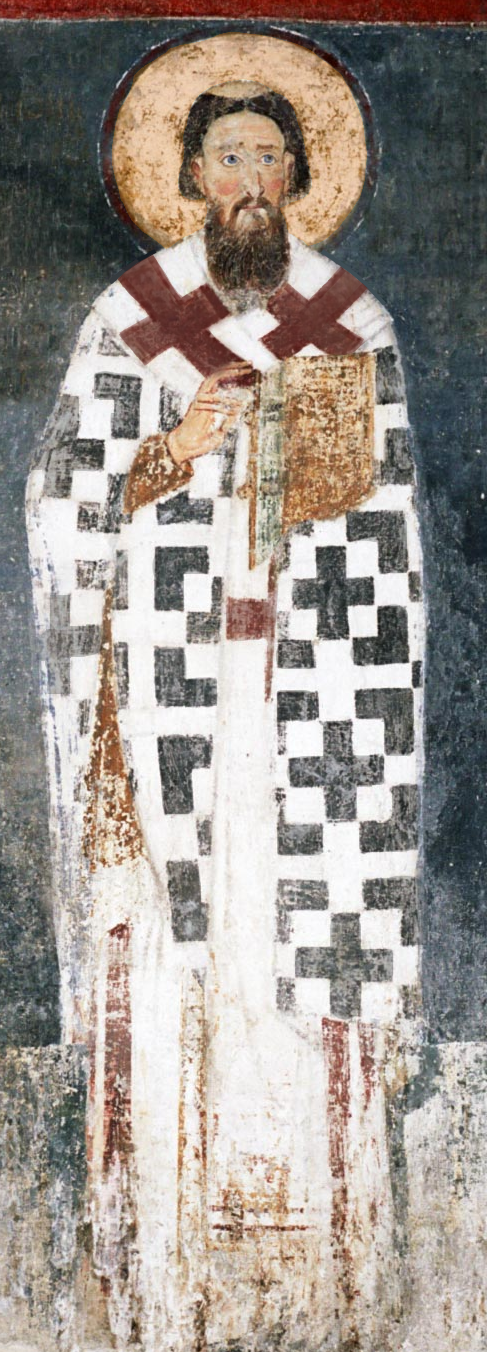
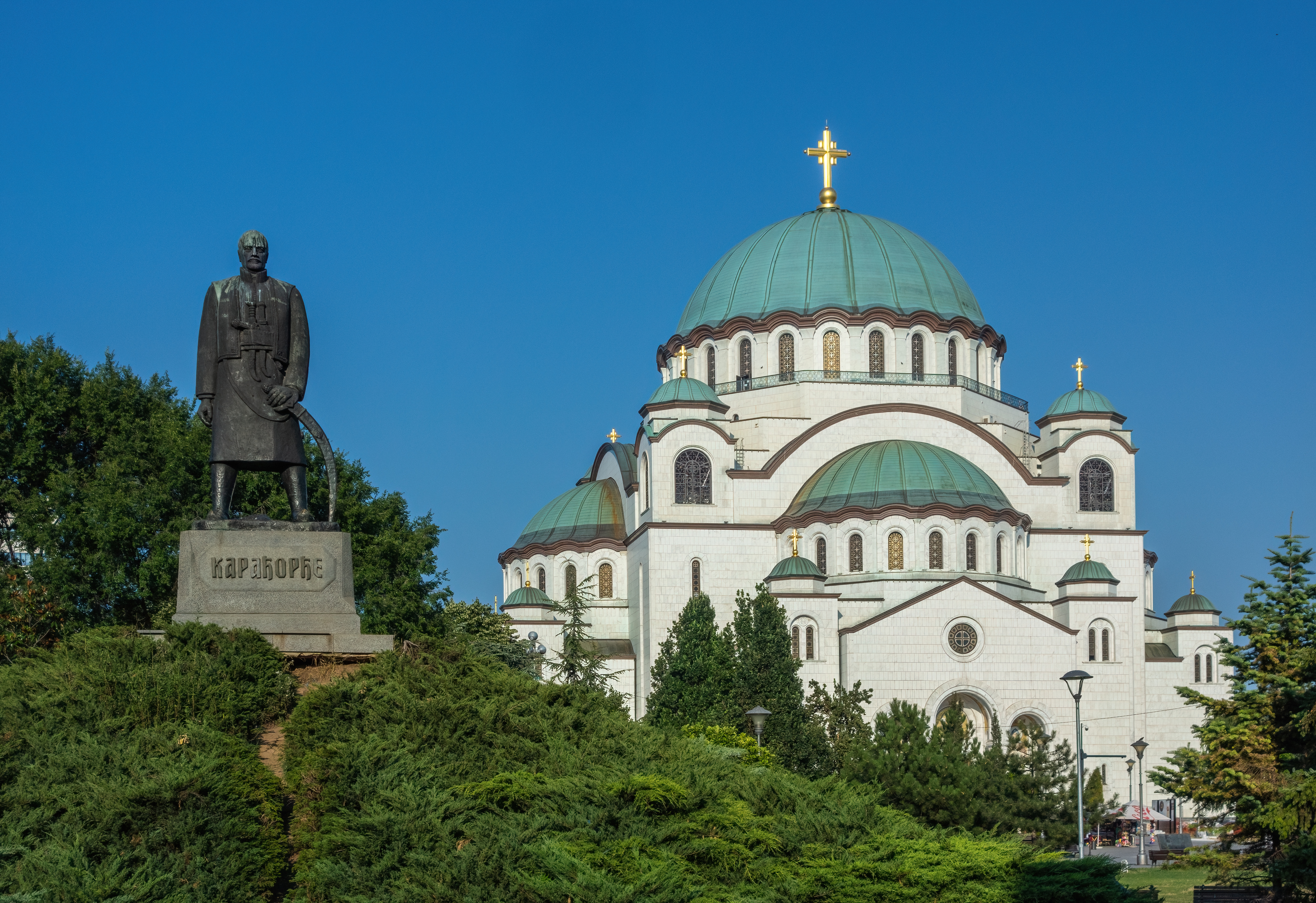
Left: Medieval fresco of Saint Sava, traditional patron saint of the Serbs.
Right: Church of Saint Sava, one of the largest Orthodox churches in the world, built on the site where the Ottomans burned Saint Sava's relics.

Serbs are predominantly Orthodox Christians and the westernmost majority-Orthodox ethnic group in the world. They are, at least nominally, members of the Serbian Orthodox Church, one of the ecclesiastically independent Eastern Orthodox churches. Led by the Serbian Patriarch church is organized into metropolitanates and eparchies, located in Serbia, Bosnia-Herzegovina, Montenegro, and Croatia; other congregations are located in the Serb diaspora. Around 8 million people worldwide adhere to the Serbian Orthodox Church. During the centuries of Ottoman rule, the Serbian Orthodox Church remained the only permitted Serb institution. Through its monasteries and clergy, it preserved the Serbian language, literacy, written history, and national consciousness when all other forms of statehood and education had been extinguished. When the Principality of Serbia gained independence from the Ottoman Empire, Orthodoxy became crucial in defining the national identity, instead of language which was shared by other South Slavs.

Prior to their Christianization in the 9th century, the Serbs followed Slavic paganism. After the East–West Schism of 1054 they aligned with Eastern Orthodoxy. Over subsequent centuries, however, smaller groups of Serbs converted to other religions. During Ottoman rule, a substantial number of Serbs converted to Islam, particularly in Bosnia and Herzegovina and Sandžak. Historically, some ethnic Serbs in coastal region of Dalmatia (particularly Bay of Kotor and Dubrovnik), belonged to the Catholic Church; this Serb Catholic identity was later associated with the Serb-Catholic movement in Dubrovnik. Thus, while Eastern Orthodoxy has been the dominant and defining faith of the Serbs for a millennium, minority communities of Catholic and Muslim Serbs have existed at various points in history.

=== Language ===
Letters of the Serbian Cyrillic alphabet. Serbian is the only European language with active digraphia, using both Cyrillic and Latin scripts.

Serbs speak Serbian, a member of the South Slavic group of languages. Standard Serbian is a normative variety of Serbo-Croatian, and therefore mutually intelligible with Bosnian, Croatian, and Montenegrin.

Serbian is an official language in Serbia, co-official in Bosnia-Herzegovina and disputed territory of Kosovo, and a recognized minority language in Montenegro (spoken by a plurality of population), Croatia, North Macedonia, Romania, Hungary, Czech Republic, and Slovakia. Older form of literary Serbian is Church Slavonic of the Serbian recension, which continues to be used in the liturgy of the Serbian Orthodox Church.

Serbian has active digraphia, using both Cyrillic and Latin scripts. Serbian Cyrillic, widely regarded as a key symbol of Serb cultural identity, was devised in 1814 by Serbian linguist Vuk Karadžić, who designed it according to strict phonemic principles (one letter per sound). It differs from other Slavic Cyrillic alphabets by omitting several letters. The Serbian Latin alphabet was created by Ljudevit Gaj and designed to correspond perfectly, letter-for-letter, to the Serbian Cyrillic alphabet that Vuk Karadžić had standardized a more than a decade earlier. In Serbia, Serbian Cyrillic has the constitutional status of "official script", while the Latin script is designated as "script in official use" for practical purposes. Serbian Cyrillic is also script in official use in both Montenegro and Bosnia-Herzegovina, alongside the Latin alphabet.

Loanwords in the Serbian language besides common internationalisms are mostly from Greek, German, and Italian, while words of Hungarian origin are present mostly in the north. The Ottoman conquest began a linguistical contact between Ottoman Turkish and South Slavic languages. Besides Turkish loanwords, also many Arabic (such as alat, "tool", sat, "hour, clock") and Persian (čarape, "socks", šećer, "sugar") words entered via Turkish, called "Orientalisms" (orijentalizmi). There is considerable usage of French words as well, especially in military related terms. One Serbian word that is used in many of the world's languages is "vampire" (vampir).

=== Names ===
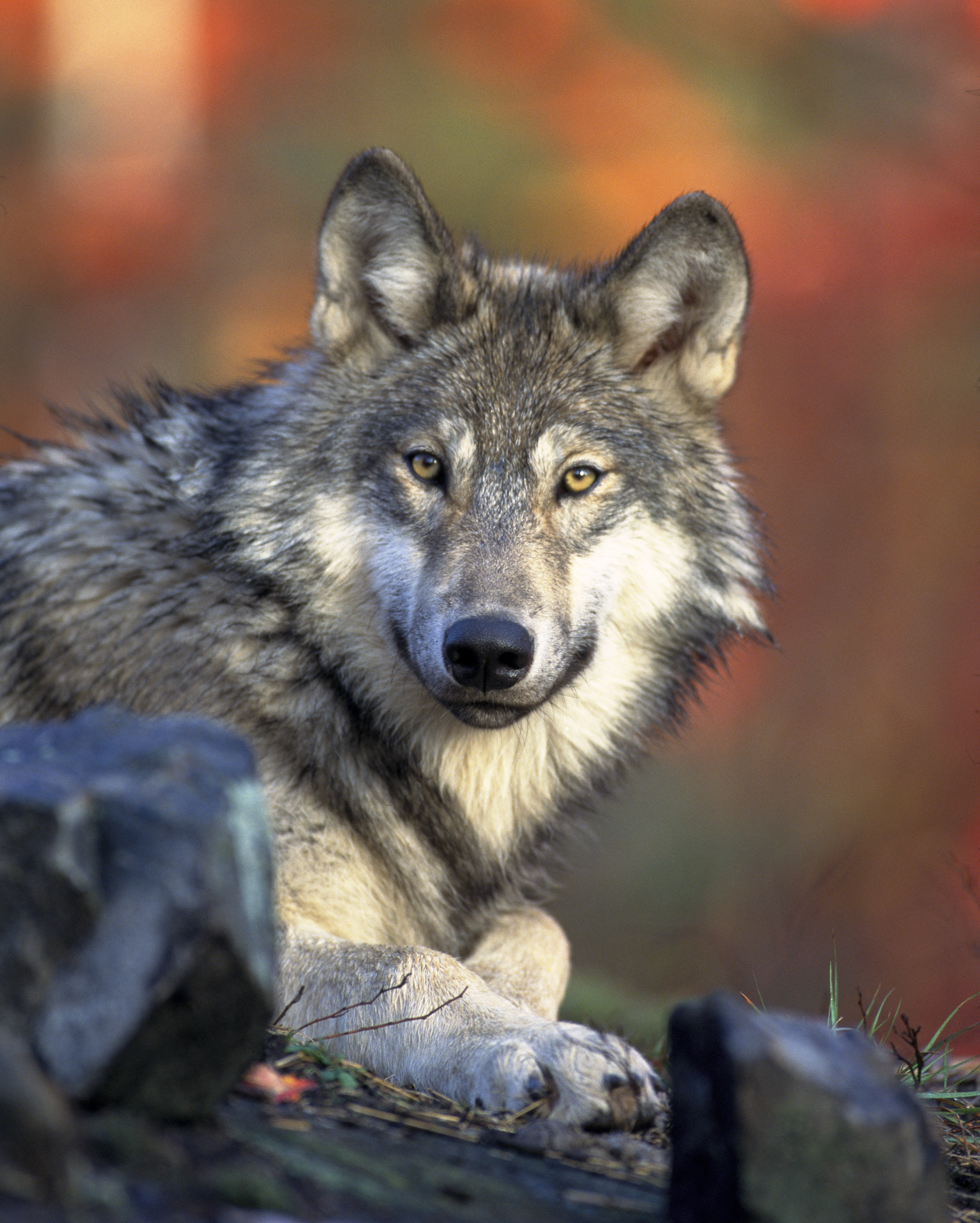
Many Serb names and surnames are derived from the word wolf, which is the national animal and an important part of the national mythology.

There are several different layers of Serbian names. Serbian given names largely originate from Slavic roots: e.g., Vuk, Bojan, Goran, Zoran, Dragan, Milan, Miroslav, Vladimir, Slobodan, Dušan, Milica, Nevena, Vesna, Radmila. Other names are of Christian origin, originating from the Bible (Hebrew, through Greek), such as Lazar, Mihailo, Ivan, Jovan, Ilija, Marija, Ana, Ivana. Along similar lines of non-Slavic Christian names are Greek ones such as: Stefan, Nikola, Aleksandar, Filip, Đorđe, Andrej, Jelena, Katarina, Vasilije, Todor, while those of Latin origin include: Marko, Antonije, Srđan, Marina, Petar, Pavle, Natalija, Igor (through Russian).

Many Serbian names and surnames are derived from the word for "wolf" (vuk) which is both the national animal and a prominent motif in Serbian mythology. Vuk ("Wolf") was the 3rd most popular name for boys in Serbia in 2021.

Most Serbian surnames are paternal, maternal, occupational or derived from personal traits. It is estimated that over two thirds of all Serbian surnames have the suffix -ić (-ић) ([itɕ]), a Slavic diminutive, originally functioning to create patronymics. Thus the surname Petrović means the "son of Petar" (from a male progenitor, the root is extended with possessive -ov or -ev). Due to limited use of international typewriters and unicode computer encoding, the suffix may be simplified to -ic, historically transcribed with a phonetic ending, -ich or -itch in foreign languages. Other common surname suffixes found among Serbian surnames are -ov, -ev, -in and -ski (without -ić) which is the Slavic possessive case suffix, thus Nikola's son becomes Nikolin, Petar's son Petrov, and Jovan's son Jovanov. Other, less common suffices are -alj/olj/elj, -ija, -ica, -ar/ac/an/a. The ten most common surnames in Serbia, in order, are Jovanović, Petrović, Nikolić, Marković, Đorđević, Stojanović, Ilić, Stanković, Pavlović, and Milošević.

=== Symbols ===
Serb tricolour

The most widely recognized symbols of ethnic Serbs are the pan-Serb tricolour flag, the Serbian cross, and the three-finger salute.

The Serb tricolour consists of three horizontal stripes: red, blue, and white (from top to bottom). It has been in continuous use since 1839 and is used more as an ethnic rather than state symbol. It serves as the civil flag of Serbia, the flag of Republika Srpska in Bosnia and Herzegovina, the official ethnic flag of Serb minorities in Croatia and North Macedonia, and is widely used by Serb diaspora communities worldwide.

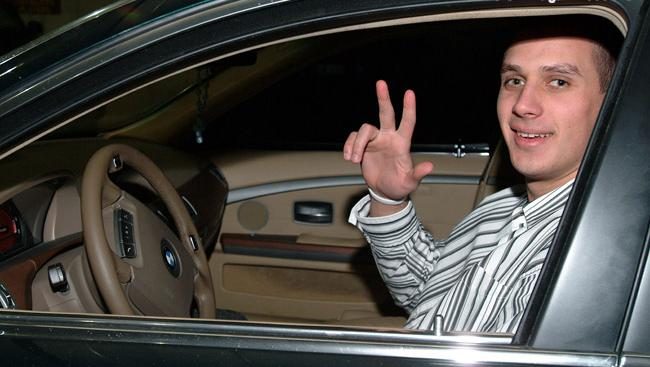
Three-finger salute

The Serbian cross is the main heraldic symbol and is widely used by Serbs as an ethnic identifier. The cross appears on the state flag and coat of arms of Serbia but is also a distinctly Serbian Orthodox Church symbol. It is composed of a cross symbol with four firesteels or, more commonly in heraldry, four stylised Cyrillic letters "С" (representing the motto Само слога Србина спасава / Samo sloga Srbina spasava – "Only Unity Saves the Serbs").

The three-finger salute (raising the thumb, index and middle finger while folding the ring and little fingers) is a distinctly Serb gesture, recognised as a sign of ethnic pride. The gesture is widely used in wide variety of events: from street demonstrations and celebrations, election campaign rallies, to sporting events and personal celebrations.

=== Traditions ===
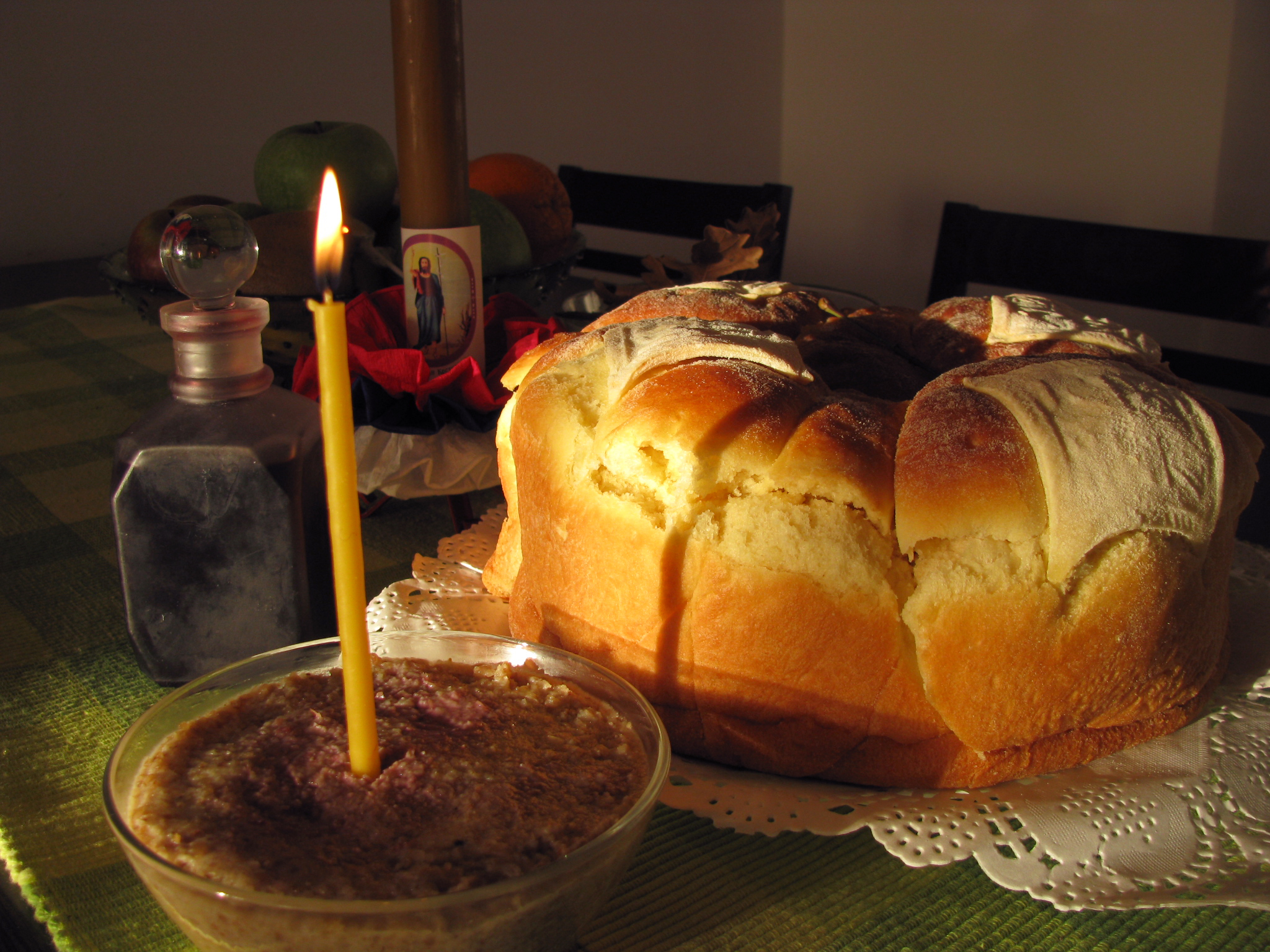
Ritual foods for Slava: Slavski kolač (yeast bread) and koljivo (boiled wheat sweetened and mixed with walnuts).

Slava is the Serbian Orthodox tradition of the veneration and observance of the family's patron saint. Every family has their own patron saint that is celebrated on the feast day. The most common feast days are St. Nicholas (Nikoljdan, December 19), St. George (Đurđevdan, May 6), St. John the Baptist (Jovandan, January 20), St. Demetrius (Mitrovdan, November 8), and St. Michael (Aranđelovdan, November 21). A key feature of Slava is its emphasis on hospitality: on that day, the family’s home is open to everyone who knows the date of their celebration: typically relatives, friends, neighbours, and acquaintances.

Serbs have their own Christmas traditions, which include the badnjak, a young oak log regarded as a sacral tree. At Easter, egg decorating and egg tapping are common traditions.

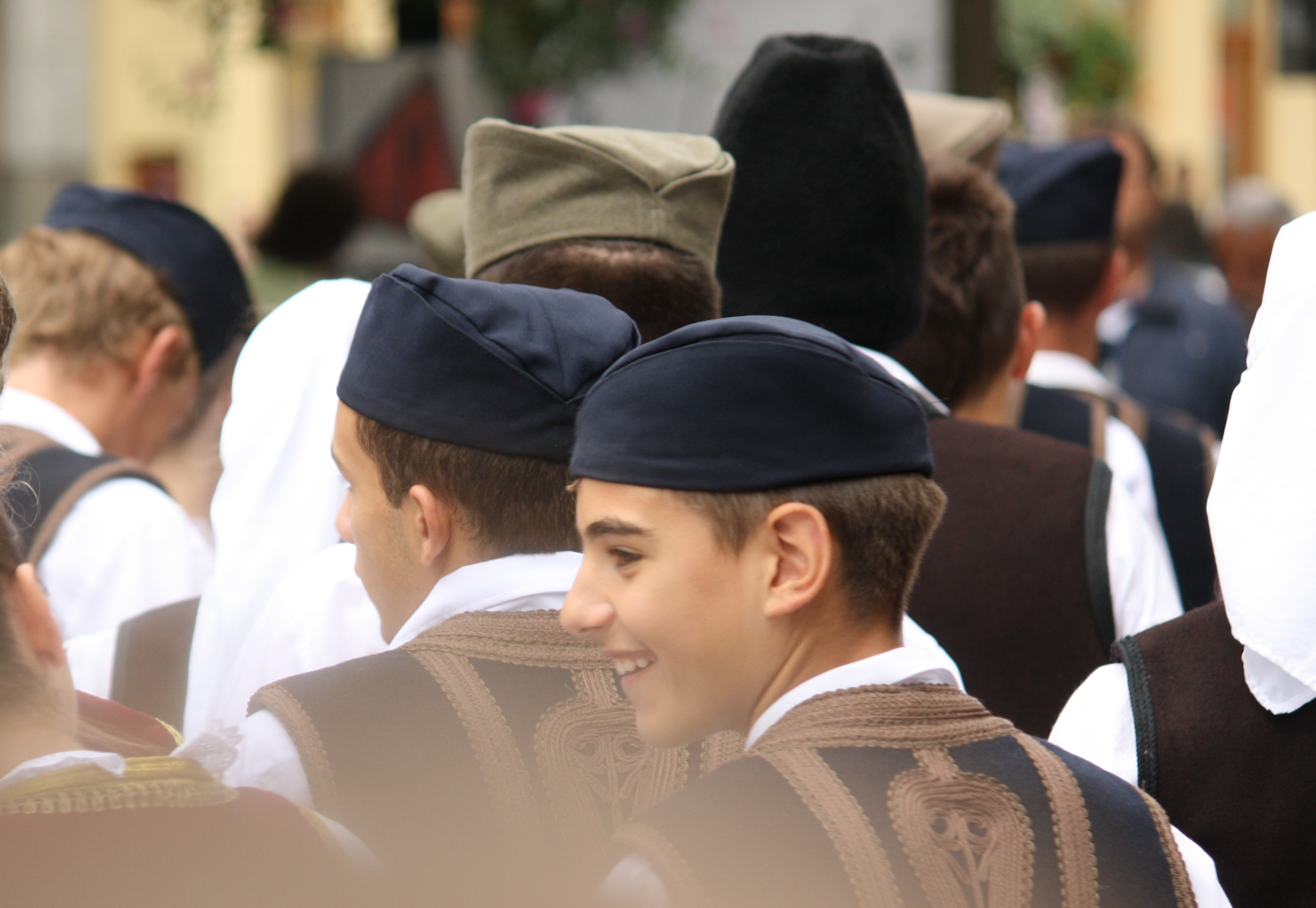
Boys wearing the šajkača, a traditional cap.

The Serbian traditional folk costume varies from region to region, while the most common is that of Šumadija, a region in central Serbia. It includes šajkača (hat with a V-shaped top, typically black or grey in colour, made of soft, homemade cloth) and opanci (footwear with low back, curved peak at front, with woven front upper, a low back and leather ties).

Kolo is a traditional folk dancing. It is the circle dance, usually performed amongst groups of at least three people and up to several dozen people, with dancers holding each other's hands and forming a circle, a single chain or multiple parallel lines. The most popular varieties include Užičko kolo and Moravac.

There are numerous traditional Serb handicrafts that vary from region to region, including the renowned Pirot carpet as well as the UNESCO-listed Zmijanje embroidery and Zlakusa pottery.

=== Cuisine ===
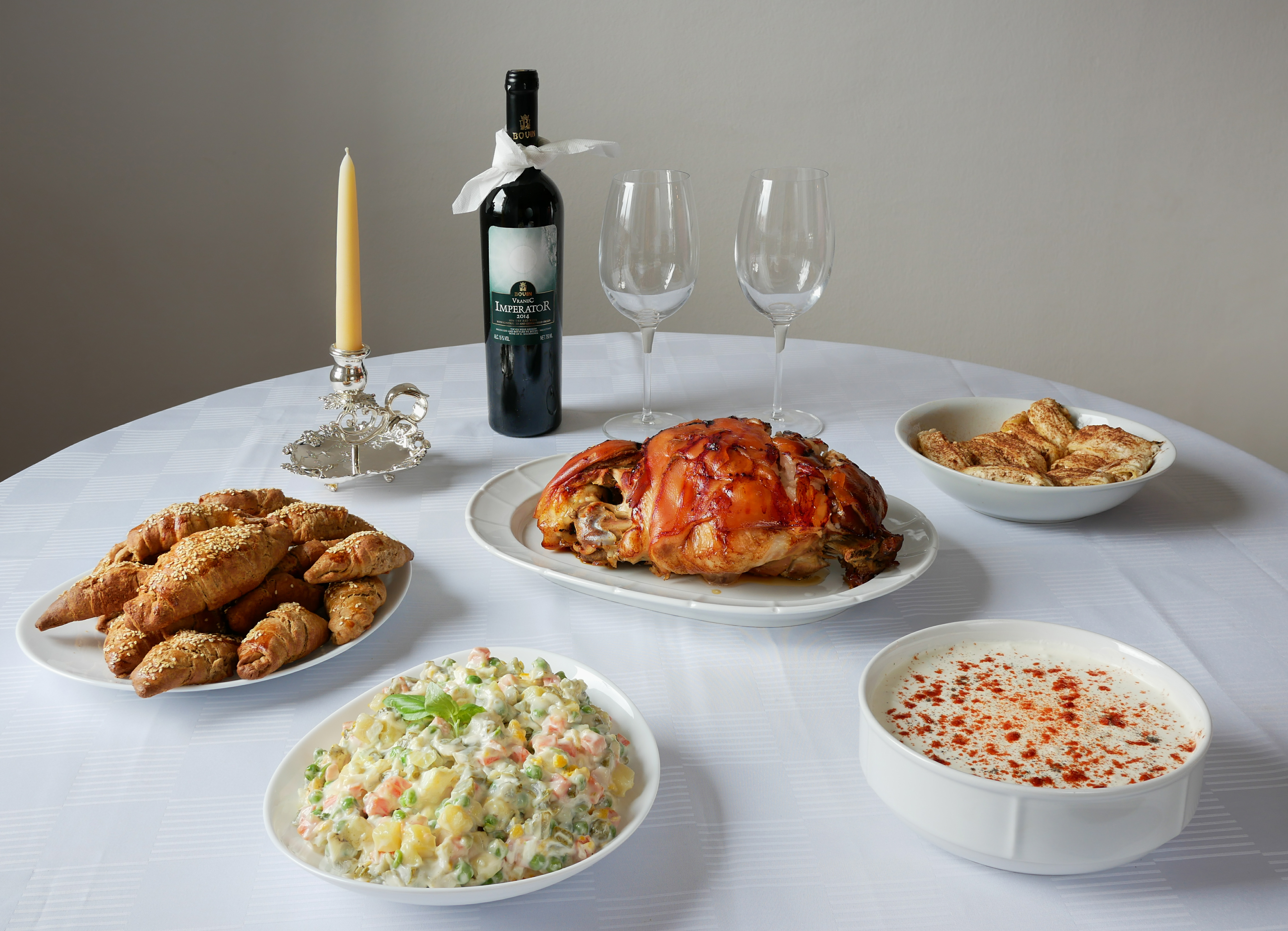
The traditional Christmas table often features roast pork, hearty soup, crescent rolls, and Olivier salad, accompanied by wine or rakija.

Serbian cuisine is largely heterogeneous, with heavy Oriental, Central European, and Mediterranean influences. Despite this, it has evolved and achieved its own culinary identity. Food is very important in Serbian social life, particularly during religious holidays such as Christmas, Easter, and Serbian Orthodox patron saint celebration (slava). Staples of the Serbian diet include bread, meat, fruits, vegetables, and dairy products. Traditionally, three meals are consumed per day. Breakfast generally consists of eggs, meat and bread. Lunch is considered the main meal, and is normally eaten in the afternoon. Bread is the basis of all Serbian meals, and it plays an important role in Serbian cuisine and can be found in religious rituals. A traditional Serbian welcome is to offer bread and salt to guests, and also slatko (fruit preserve). Meat is widely consumed, while fish is eaten to a much lesser extent. Serbian specialties include ćevapi (grilled dish of minced meat), pljeskavica (grilled dish consisting of a mixture of spiced minced pork, beef and lamb meat), Karađorđeva šnicla (breaded cutlet dish of veal or pork steak, stuffed with kajmak), gibanica (an egg and cheese pie made with filo dough), kajmak (dairy product similar to clotted cream), proja (cornbread), and kačamak (corn-flour porridge).

Šljivovica (its international name, "Slivovitz", originates from the Serbian language), or plum brandy, is Serbia’s national drink, distilled from plums, the country’s national fruit, and has been produced domestically for centuries. Serbia is the world’s largest exporter of Slivovitz and the second-largest plum producer. Šljivovica holds a central place in Serbian culture: it is the traditional rakija, served as an aperitif, offered at the start or end of meals, and present at every major life event (birth, baptism, wedding, funeral) as well as at the slava. Although šljivovica dominates, Serbia also has a long winemaking tradition, dating back to Roman times in the 3rd century, with Serbs actively involved since the 8th century. Traditionally, Turkish coffee is prepared after a meal, and is served in small cups.

== Arts ==
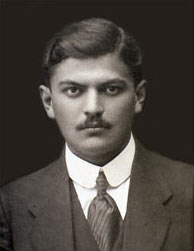
Prominent artists (clockwise from top left): Paja Jovanović, Nadežda Petrović, Sava Šumanović, Marina Abramović.

Serbian arts have produced many remarkable individual artists across centuries, from medieval fresco painters to today's renowned figures.

In the 12th–15th centuries, anonymous master painters created the luminous frescoes and icons preserved in UNESCO-listed monasteries such as Studenica, Sopoćani, Mileševa, Gračanica, and Visoki Dečani.

In the 18th century, baroque and rococo icon painting flourished among Serbs in the Habsburg Monarchy. Pioneering painters included Nikola Nešković, Teodor Kračun, Jakov Orfelin, Teodor Ilić Češljar, who blended Eastern Orthodox tradition with Central-European and Russian influences and introduced portraits and still lifes.

The early 19th century was dominated by neoclassicism and the influence of the Vienna Academy. Leading painters included Pavel Đurković, Konstantin Danil, Katarina Ivanović (the first professionally trained Serbian female painter), Nikola Aleksić and Dimitrije Avramović, known for precise, balanced portraits of the emerging civil society. In the 1830s–1850s the same core group turned to intimate biedermeier family portraits, genre scenes and still lifes.

Mid-19th-century romanticism and historicism produced passionate national-historical canvases by Đura Jakšić, Stevan Todorović and Novak Radonić, celebrating Serb uprisings against Ottomans and the medieval Nemanjić era. Late 19th-century academic realism and Orientalism reached international acclaim through Paja Jovanović (notably Migration of the Serbs and The Wounded Montenegrin) and the subtle genre scenes and portraits of Uroš Predić (Kosovo Maiden and Happy Brothers). Graphic arts and lithography were transformed by Anastas Jovanović, while Uroš Knežević and Đorđe Krstić further enriched the field.

Early 20th-century modernism brought impressionism and fauvism through Nadežda Petrović and cubism through Sava Šumanović. Stevan Aleksić represented Symbolism in the same period.

After World War II, powerful abstract and surrealist painting emerged with Petar Lubarda, Vladimir Veličković, and Ljubomir Popović.

Today, Marina Abramović, though primarily known for performance art, remains the most globally recognized figure to emerge from the Serbian art scene.

=== Music ===
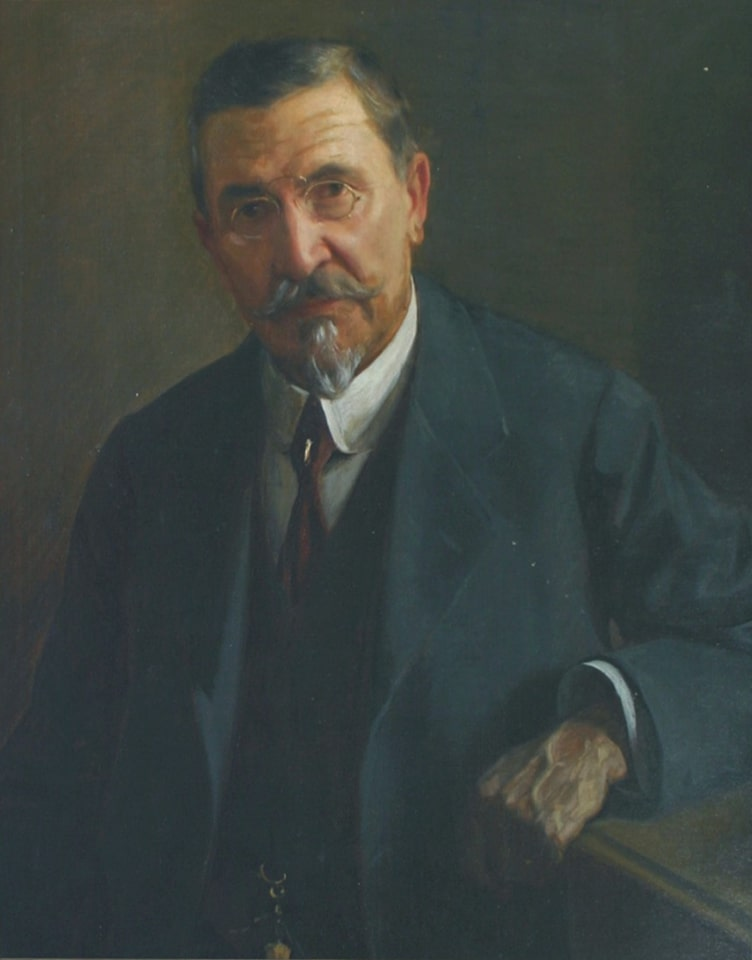
Stevan Mokranjac, considered the father of modern Serbian music.

The earliest known Serbian composers date back to the 14th and 15th centuries. Among them, Kir Stefan the Serb stands out as one of the most important figures of medieval Serbian church music, renowned for his sophisticated liturgical compositions and notated manuscripts.

Stevan Stojanović Mokranjac, a composer and musicologist, is widely regarded as the founder of modern Serbian music. Kornelije Stanković, the pioneer who in the mid-19th century first systematically harmonized and notated Serbian church melodies and folk songs in Western notation, laying essential foundations for all later national composers. Petar Konjović preserved a strong national character in his works while modernizing romantic traditions toward impressionism. Stevan Hristić similarly combined Serbian national expression with a refined evolution of romanticism into impressionist styles. Miloje Milojević, the third major figure of this first generation, also maintained national roots while directing his music toward Impressionism. Other prominent Serbian classical composers include: Isidor Bajić (known for his lyrical operas and choral works deeply rooted in Vojvodina folk traditions), Stanislav Binički (celebrated especially for composing the March on the Drina which became one of the most powerful musical symbols of Serbian national identity, often compared to what La Marseillaise is for France), Josif Marinković (master of Romantic choral music and one of the most important 19th-century Serbian song composers), and Isidora Žebeljan (one of the most internationally performed Serbian composers of the 21st century, acclaimed for her operas, orchestral works, and chamber music that combine Balkan folk elements with contemporary techniques).

In the 20th and 21st centuries, Serbia has produced world-class performers as well. Violinist Stefan Milenkovich, a former child prodigy who performed for presidents and popes by age ten, is today one of the most respected soloists of his generation. Nemanja Radulović, has become an international star, regularly performing with leading orchestras and reaching wide audiences.

=== Literature ===
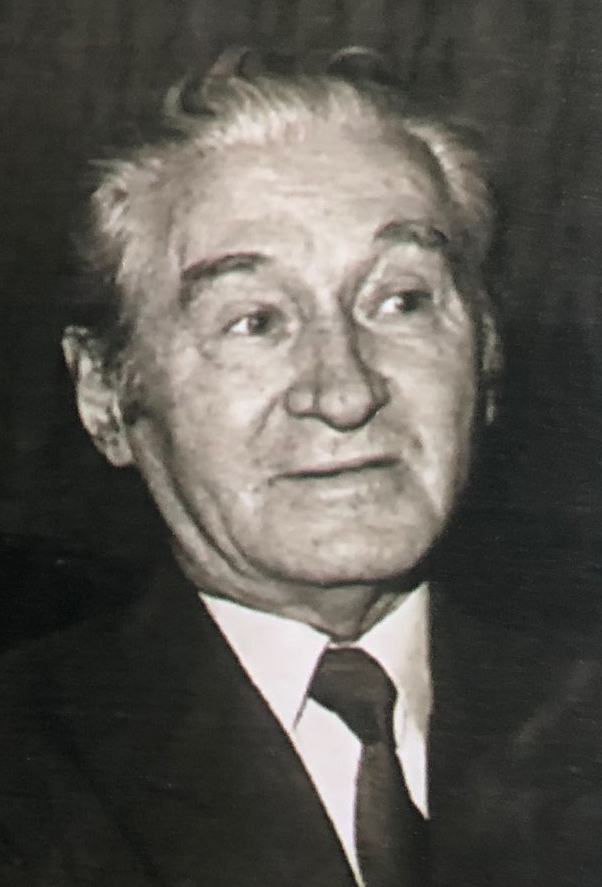
Noted authors (clockwise from top left): Petar II Petrović Njegoš, Miloš Crnjanski, Borislav Pekić, Charles Simic.

Most literature written by early Serbs was about religious themes, various gospels, psalters, menologies, hagiographies, along with essays and sermons. The earliest surviving works are medieval religious texts, with the magnificently illuminated late-12th century Miroslav Gospel and Vukan Gospel standing as masterpieces of the era. The Crnojević printing house was the first printing house in Southeastern Europe and is considered an important part of Serbian cultural history.

Notable Baroque-influenced authors were Andrija Zmajević, Gavril Stefanović Venclović, Jovan Rajić, and Zaharije Orfelin, while the classicism found its leading voice in Jovan Sterija Popović.

Modern Serbian literature truly began in the 19th century with Vuk Stefanović Karadžić, who reformed the language and collected folk songs, and with the poet-prince Petar II Petrović-Njegoš and his epic The Mountain Wreath. Romantic poetry reached its height with Branko Radičević, Jovan Jovanović Zmaj, Laza Kostić, and Đura Jakšić. Realism produced major prose writers including Borisav Stanković, Radoje Domanović, Stevan Sremac, and Petar Kočić.

In the early 20th century, the literary critic and historian Jovan Skerlić emerged as a leading figure, actively promoting modernism and significantly influencing the direction of Serbian literature. The modernist and symbolist movements that followed were dominated by the poets Jovan Dučić, Milan Rakić, Aleksa Šantić, and Vladislav Petković Dis. During the interwar period, the Serbian avant-garde produced highly original work through writers such as Miloš Crnjanski, Rastko Petrović, and Momčilo Nastasijević.

After World War II, the most prominent figures included Nobel laureate Ivo Andrić, Meša Selimović, Borislav Pekić, Dobrica Ćosić, Branko Ćopić, and poet Desanka Maksimović. Amongst contemporary Serbian writers, Milorad Pavić stands out as being the most critically acclaimed and internationaly recognized. Today, Serbian literature remains internationally visible through dramatists Dušan Kovačević and Biljana Srbljanović, novelists Svetislav Basara and Zoran Živković (best-known for his science fiction works which have been published in 23 countries) and the Serbian-American Charles Simic (United States Poet Laureate and a Pulitzer Prize winner).

=== Cinema ===
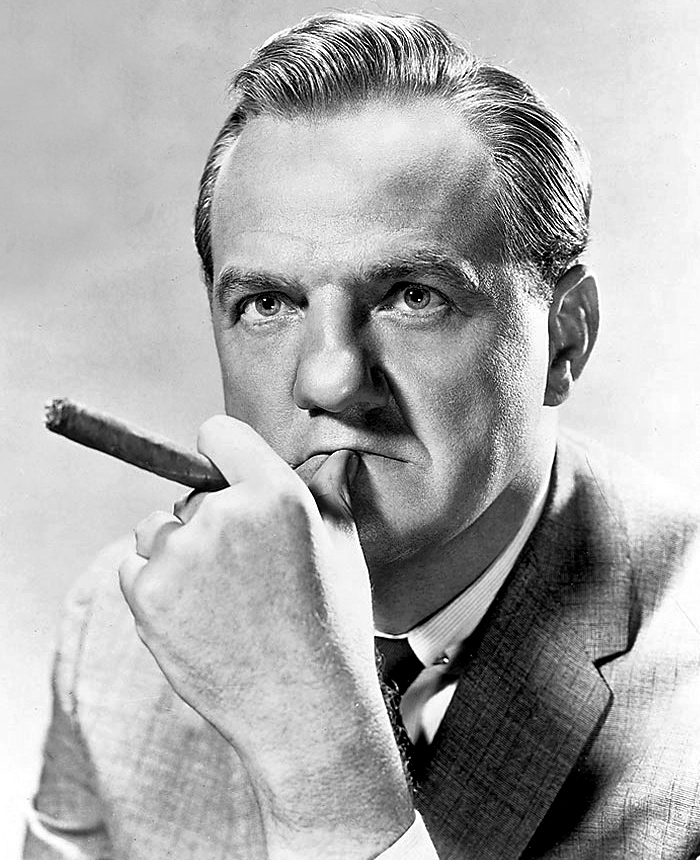
Prominent cinematic figures (clockwise from top left): Karl Malden, Milena Dravić, Miki Manojlović, Emir Kusturica.

Serbian cinema has been shaped by influential directors such as Dušan Makavejev, Emir Kusturica, Živojin Pavlović, Želimir Žilnik, Goran Paskaljević, Slobodan Šijan, Srđan Dragojević, and Stefan Arsenijević. Makavejev's avant-garde films and Kusturica's award-winning work (won the Palme d'Or twice for When Father Was Away on Business and Underground, as well as the Silver Bear at the Berlin Film Festival for Arizona Dream and Silver Lion at the Venice Film Festival for Black Cat, White Cat) brought international attention to Yugoslav and Serbian filmmaking. Pavlović, Žilnik (winner of the Golden Bear at the Berlin Film Festival for Early Works) were central figures of the Yugoslav Black Wave, pushing political and artistic boundaries. Šijan and Dragojević became icons of popular cinema with cult comedies and socially engaged dramas. Stefan Arsenijević won the Short Film Golden Bear at the Berlin Film Festival for Atorsion short film, while Mila Turajlić won the main award at IDFA for The Other Side of Everything documentary film.

Among notable actors, Serbia boasts talents like Danilo Bata Stojković, Pavle Vuisić, Zoran Radmilović, Ljuba Tadić, Miki Manojlović, Rade Šerbedžija, Dragan Nikolić, and Nebojša Glogovac. These actors shaped both classic Yugoslav films and contemporary Serbian productions with their versatility and strong screen presence. Prominent actresses include Milena Dravić, Mira Banjac, Mirjana Karanović, Svetlana Bojković, and Jasna Đuričić.

Several Americans of Serb origin have been featured prominently in Hollywood. The most notable of these were Academy Award winners Karl Malden, Steve Tesich, and Peter Bogdanovich; Tony-winning theatre director Darko Tresnjak; Emmy-winning director Marina Zenovich, and actors Brad Dexter, Milla Jovovich, Lolita Davidovich, and Stana Katic.

== Philosophy ==
Dositej Obradović, an Enlightenment thinker, writer, educator, and the first Minister of Education of Serbia, is regarded as the first modern Serbian philosopher and a key figure in promoting rationalism.

In the 19th century, the rationalist thinking was continued by the positivist Svetozar Marković, the leading Serbian socialist thinker who criticized utopian socialism and advocated a realist, materially grounded social analysis, though his thought aligned more with Russian populist revolutionary-democracy than with strict Marxist scientific socialism.

The most influential Serbian philosopher of the first half of the 20th century was Branislav Petronijević, a metaphysician and logician who developed an original "monadological" system and pluralistic philosophy that attracted attention from Bertrand Russell and Henri Bergson. In the interwar and post-war period, several important thinkers emerged within Marxist philosophy, including Mihailo Marković and Gajo Petrović (member of the Praxis School), who developed a humanist, anti-Stalinist interpretation of Marxism.

Among contemporary Serbian philosophers, the most internationally recognized names are classicist Mihailo Đurić and the religious philosophers, bishop Nikolaj Velimirović and Justin Popović, whose Orthodox theology continues to have a wide influence.

== Science ==
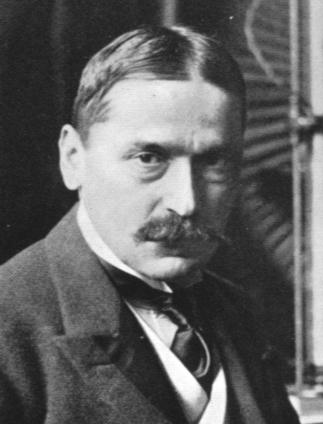
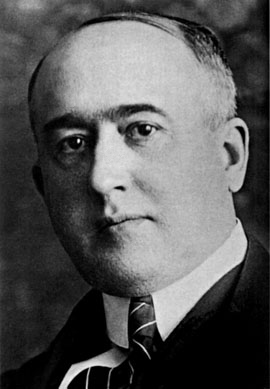
Noted inventors and scientists (clockwise from top left): Nikola Tesla, Mihajlo Pupin, Jovan Cvijić, Milutin Milanković.

Serbian American mechanical and electrical engineer Nikola Tesla is widely regarded as one of the greatest inventors in history, celebrated especially for his revolutionary work on alternating current (AC) electricity and magnetism. Physicist and electrical engineer Mihajlo Pupin developed the landmark theory of modern electrical filters and held numerous patents. Astronomer Milutin Milanković formulated the theory of long-term climate change driven by variations in Earth’s orbit and axis, now known as Milankovitch cycles. Roger Joseph Boscovich, a Ragusan physicist, astronomer, mathematician and polymath of paternal Serbian origin, produced a precursor of atomic theory, made many contributions to astronomy and discovered the absence of atmosphere on the Moon. Nuclear physicist Pavle Savić helped lay the groundwork for the discovery of nuclear fission and later led nuclear research efforts in Yugoslavia. Theoretical physicist Mileva Marić, Albert Einstein's first wife, contributed significantly to the early development of the theory of special relativity and other foundational works in modern physics. Physicist and environmental scientist Tihomir Novakov made groundbreaking discoveries about the role of black carbon (soot) in atmospheric aerosols, significantly advancing the understanding of air pollution and its impact on climate change. Chemist Sima Lozanić was among the first promoters of the periodic table of elements, while archaeologist Miloje Vasić became widely recognized after the discovery of the Neolithic site of Vinča culture in 1905 and subsequent excavation, which began in 1908. Jovan Žujović made a decisive contribution to the geological research of the Balkan Peninsula.

Among notable Serbian mathematicians are Mihailo Petrović Alas (who made major contributions to differential equations and phenomenology and built one of the first prototypes of an analog computer), Jovan Karamata (leading figure in mathematical analysis), and Đuro Kurepa (known for his work in set theory and combinatorics).

Geographer Jovan Cvijić founded modern geography in Serbia, conducted pioneering studies of the Balkan Peninsula and advanced karst research. Botanist Josif Pančić discovered numerous plant species, including the endemic Serbian spruce. Biologist and physiologist Ivan Đaja performed research in the role of the adrenal glands in thermoregulation, as well as pioneering work in hypothermia. Teodor Janković Mirijevski was one of the finest education reformers of 18th century Europe.

Biomedical engineer Gordana Vunjak-Novakovic has advanced tissue engineering for regenerative medicine, stem-cell research, and disease modeling. Neuroscientist and sleep researcher Miodrag Radulovački pioneered studies on the neurochemical mechanisms of sleep and wakefulness, particularly the role of adenosine. Economist Branko Milanović is an international expert on income distribution and inequality. Miroslav Krstić is a distinguished scholar in control theory.

Seven Serbian American engineers and scientists known as "Serbo 7" took part in construction of the Apollo spaceship. The most famous Serbian legal scholars are Slobodan Jovanović and Valtazar Bogišić while a great contribution to the development of critical historiography was made by Ilarion Ruvarac, Stojan Novaković and Vladimir Ćorović.

== Sport ==
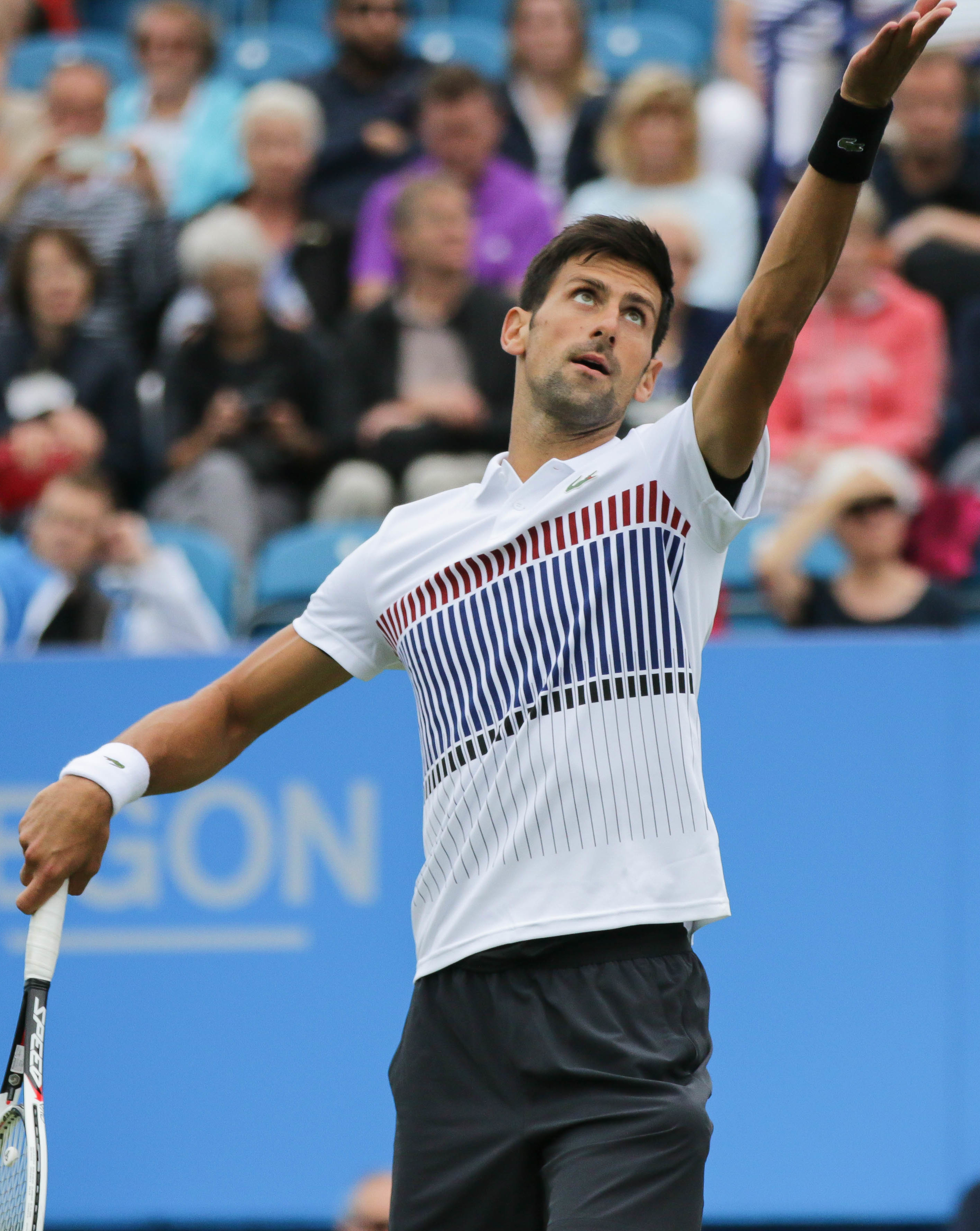
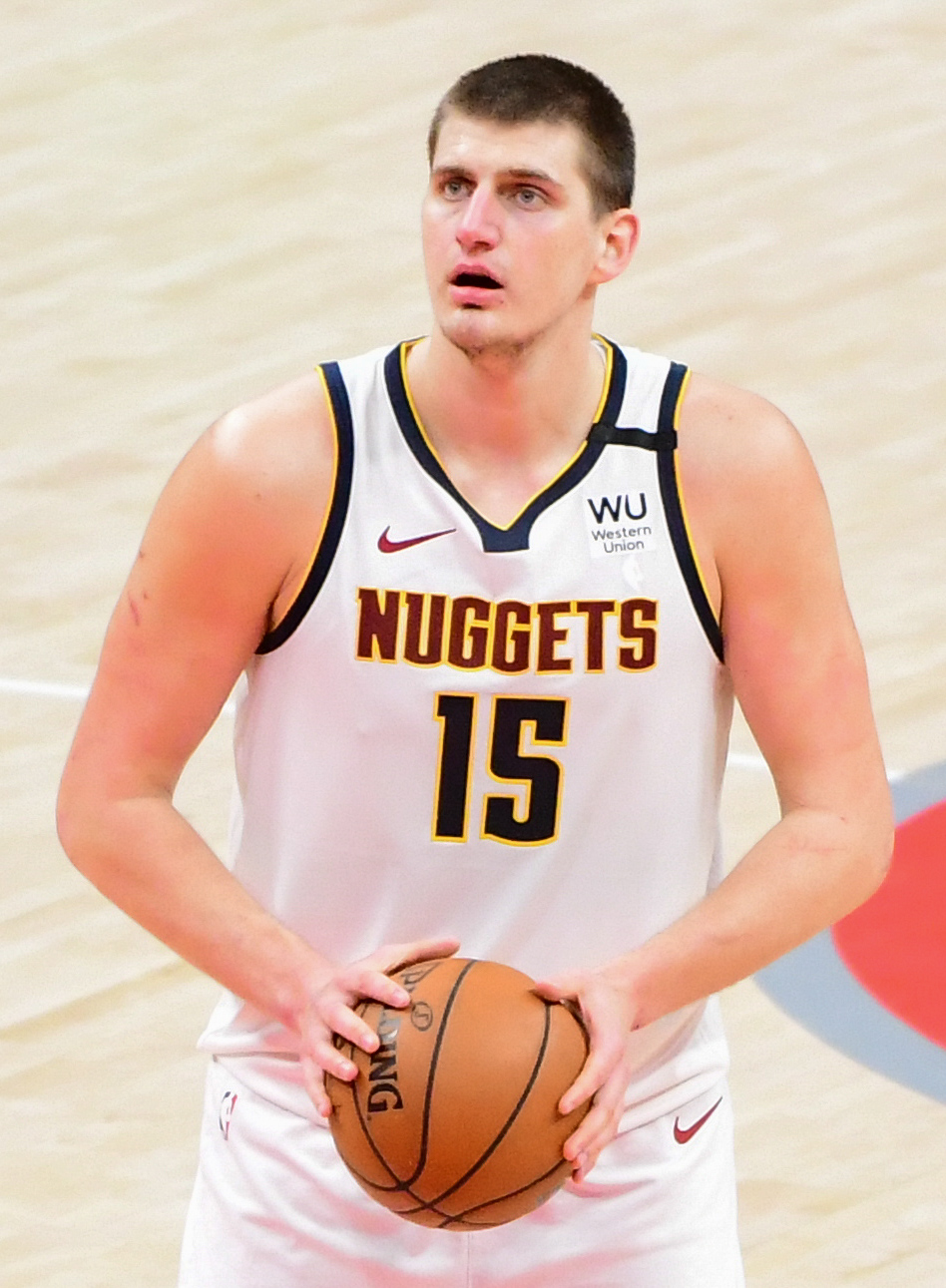
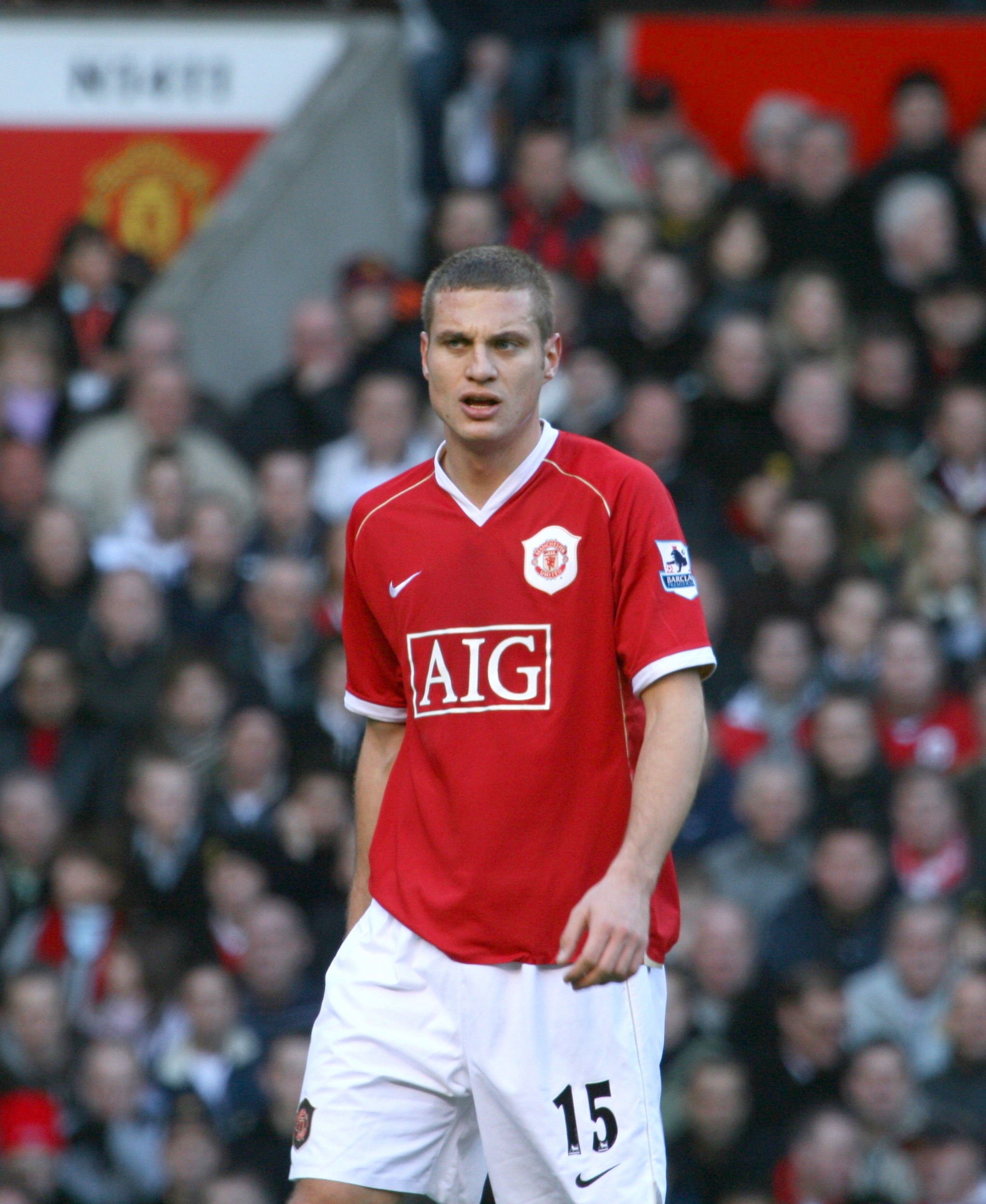
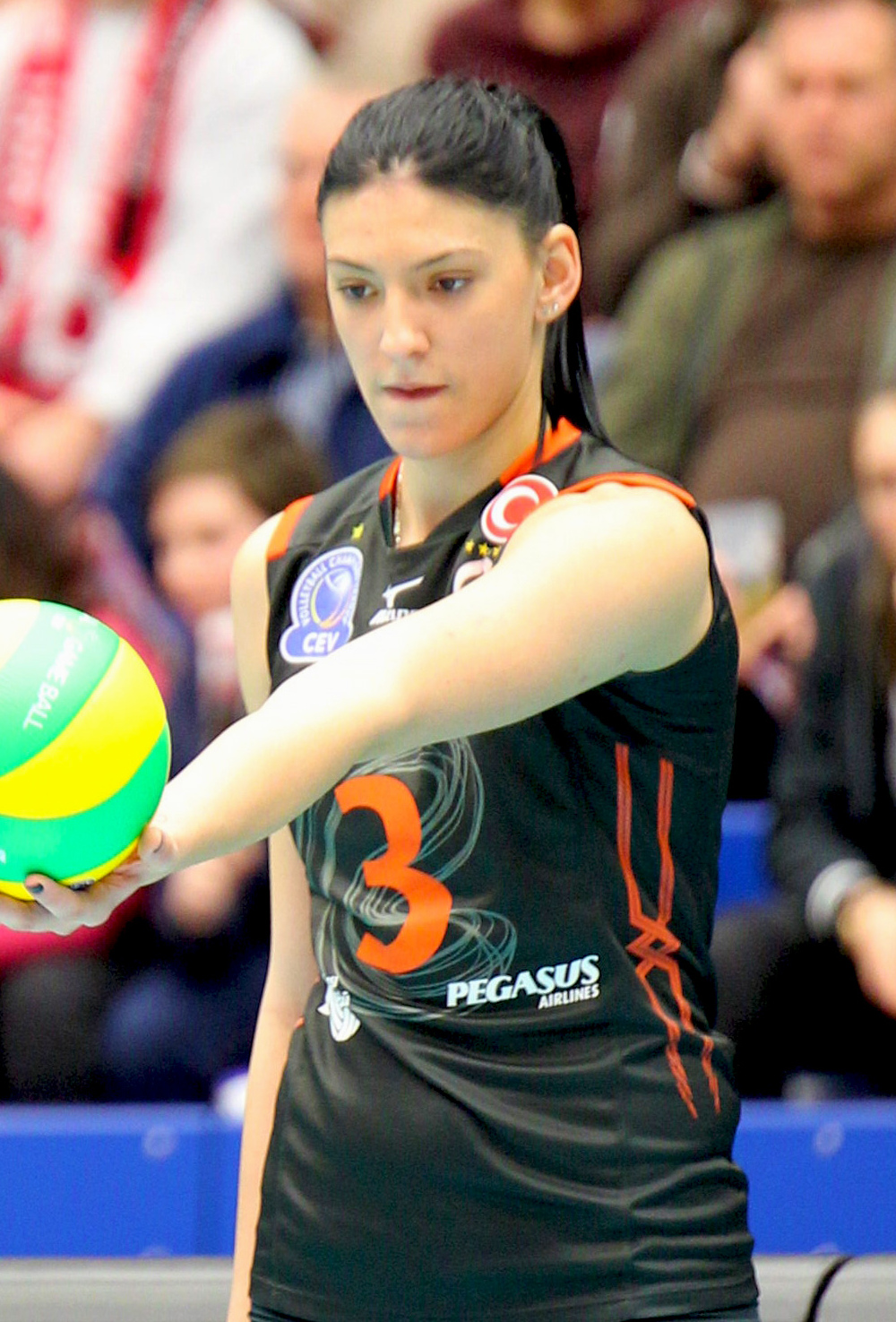
Prominent athletes (clockwise from top left): Novak Djokovic, Nikola Jokić, Nemanja Vidić, Tijana Bošković.

Serbs are renowned for their sporting achievements and have produced a remarkable number of world-class athletes.

In football, Serbia is known internationally for many standout players like Dragan Džajić (generally recognized as the greatest Serbian footballer of all time and ranked third in the 1968 Ballon d’Or), Nemanja Vidić (two-time Premier League Player of the Season and two-time selection for the FIFPRO World 11), Branislav Ivanović (two-time selection for the PFA Team of the Year), Nemanja Matić (selection for the 2014–15 PFA Team of the Year), Dragan Stojković, Siniša Mihajlović, Dejan Stanković, and Dragoslav Šekularac. Radomir Antić is the most famous Serbian football manager, the only person to have managed Spain’s three most decorated clubs: Real Madrid, Barcelona, and Atlético Madrid.

Serbian basketball enjoys global prestige with Serbia ranking fourth among all countries for the most foreign NBA players, having produced 34 to date. Nikola Jokić is widely regarded as one of the greatest basketball players of all time: three-time NBA Most Valuable Player, 2023 NBA Finals Most Valuable Player, six-time selection for All-NBA First Team, and eight-time NBA All-Star. Other standout players include Vlade Divac (member of the Hall of Fame) and Peja Stojaković (three-time NBA All-Star). Serbs left an equally enduring mark on European basketball: three FIBA Hall of Famers from the 1960s and 1970s (Radivoj Korać, Dragan Kićanović, and Zoran Slavnić) were followed by more recent standouts such as Aleksandar Đorđević (two-time Mr. Europa), Predrag Danilović (1998 Mr. Europa), Dejan Bodiroga (2002 European Player of the Year), Miloš Teodosić (2009–10 EuroLeague MVP), Nemanja Bjelica (2014–15 EuroLeague MVP), and Vasilije Micić (2020–21 EuroLeague MVP). The renowned "Serbian coaching school" has produced Europe's most successful coaches, including Željko Obradović (record nine EuroLeague titles), Božidar Maljković (four), Aleksandar Nikolić (three), Dušan Ivković (two), and Svetislav Pešić (one).

Tennis has brought Serbs global fame through Novak Djokovic, considered the greatest tennis player of all time. Djokovic has won 101 titles, including a record 24 majors, a record 40 Masters, a record seven year-end championships, and an Olympic gold medal; he has been ranked as the world No. 1 for a record 428 weeks, and finished as the year-end No. 1 a record eight times. Other notable tennis players include Ana Ivanovic and Jelena Janković, both ranked as the world No. 1, while Nenad Zimonjić and Slobodan Živojinović were ranked No. 1 in doubles.

Other prominent Serb athletes, including Olympic champions and medalists, feature: volleyball players Tijana Bošković (three-time CEV Female Player of the Year) and Nikola Grbić (1997 CEV Player of the Year); water polo players Filip Filipović (four-time World Aquatics Player of the Year), Dušan Mandić (two-time World Aquatics Player of the Year), and Vladimir Vujasinović (2001 World Aquatics Player of the Year); handball players Dragan Škrbić (2000 IHF World Player of the Year) and Svetlana Kitić; shooter Jasna Šekarić, swimmer Milorad Čavić, track and field athlete Ivana Španović, and taekwondoist Milica Mandić (two-time Olympic gold medalist).

A number of athletes of ethnic Serb origin have represented countries other than Serbia: basketball players Pete Maravich (member of the Hall of Fame, named to the NBA's 50th Anniversary team and 75th Anniversary team), Nikola Vučević (two-time NBA All-Star), and Goran Dragić (2018 NBA All-Star); football players Milos Kerkez and Miodrag Belodedici; handball player Nikola Karabatić (regarded as one of the greatest handball players of all time); tennis players Milos Raonic and Jelena Dokic; ice-hockey players Milan Lucic and Peter Zezel; gymnast Lavinia Miloșovici; wrestler Jim Trifunov; racing driver Bill Vukovich. Momčilo Tapavica was the first Slav and Serb to win an Olympic medal, representing Hungary at the 1896 Summer Olympics.

== See also ==
- List of Serbs

== Sources ==
=== Primary sources ===
- Кунчер, Драгана (2009). Gesta Regum Sclavorum. Vol. 1. Београд-Никшић: Историјски институт, Манастир Острог. Archived from the original on 10 August 2020.
- Moravcsik, Gyula, ed. (1967) [1949]. Constantine Porphyrogenitus: De Administrando Imperio (2nd revised ed.). Washington D.C.: Dumbarton Oaks Center for Byzantine Studies. ISBN 978-0-88402-021-9. Archived from the original on 20 January 2023.
- Pertz, Georg Heinrich, ed. (1845). Einhardi Annales. Hanover. Archived from the original on 27 September 2023.
- Constantine VII Porphyrogenitus (1840). De Ceremoniis (Reiske, J. J. ed.). Impensis E. Weberi.
- Scholz, Bernhard Walter, ed. (1970). Carolingian Chronicles: Royal Frankish Annals and Nithard's Histories. University of Michigan Press. ISBN 0-472-06186-0. Archived from the original on 27 September 2023.
- Шишић, Фердо, ed. (1928). Летопис Попа Дукљанина (Chronicle of the Priest of Duklja). Београд-Загреб: Српска краљевска академија.
- Thurn, Hans, ed. (1973). Ioannis Scylitzae Synopsis historiarum. Berlin-New York: De Gruyter. ISBN 978-3-11-002285-8. Archived from the original on 27 September 2023.
- Живковић, Тибор (2009). Gesta Regum Sclavorum. Vol. 2. Београд-Никшић: Историјски институт, Манастир Острог. Archived from the original on 1 May 2019.

=== Secondary sources ===
- Albala, Ken (2011). Food Cultures of the World Encyclopedia. Santa Barbara, California: ABC-CLIO. ISBN 978-0-313-37626-9. Archived from the original on 27 September 2023.
- Bataković, Dušan T. (1996). The Serbs of Bosnia & Herzegovina: History and Politics. Paris: Dialogue. ISBN 978-2-911527-10-4. Archived from the original on 15 January 2023.
- Bataković, Dušan T., ed. (2005). Histoire du peuple serbe [History of the Serbian People] (in French). Lausanne: L'Age d'Homme. ISBN 978-2-8251-1958-7. Archived from the original on 23 January 2023.
- Bédé, Jean Albert; Edgerton, William Benbow (1980). The Columbia Dictionary of Modern European Literature. New York, NY: Columbia University Press. ISBN 978-0-231-03717-4. Archived from the original on 27 September 2023.
- Ćirković, Sima (2004). The Serbs. Malden: Blackwell Publishing. ISBN 978-1-4051-4291-5. Archived from the original on 11 March 2025.
- Calic, Marie–Janine (2019). The Great Cauldron: A History of Southeastern Europe. Cambridge, Massachusetts: Harvard University Press. ISBN 978-0-67498-392-2. Archived from the original on 27 September 2023.
- Ćorović, Vladimir (2001) [1997]. "Српски покрет 1848. године". Историја српског народа (in Serbian). Belgrade: Јанус. Archived from the original on 6 June 2019.
- Cox, John K. (2002). The History of Serbia. Westport, Connecticut: Greenwood Press. ISBN 978-0-313-31290-8.
- Curta, Florin (2001). The Making of the Slavs: History and Archaeology of the Lower Danube Region, c. 500–700. Cambridge: Cambridge University Press. ISBN 978-1-139-42888-0. Archived from the original on 27 September 2023.
- Curta, Florin (2006). Southeastern Europe in the Middle Ages, 500–1250. Cambridge: Cambridge University Press.
- Cvetković, Vladimir (2012). Casiday, Augustine (ed.). The Orthodox Christian World. London: Routledge. ISBN 978-1-136-31484-1. Archived from the original on 27 September 2023.
- Djordjević, Ljubica; Zaimi, Zenajda (2019). "Commentary: The Law on Protection of National Minorities in the Republic of Albania" (PDF). Journal on Ethnopolitics and Minority Issues in Europe. 18 (1): 53–69. Archived (PDF) from the original on 14 July 2020.
- Fine, John Van Antwerp Jr. (1991) [1983]. The Early Medieval Balkans: A Critical Survey from the Sixth to the Late Twelfth Century. Ann Arbor, Michigan: University of Michigan Press. ISBN 0-472-08149-7. Archived from the original on 15 January 2023.
- Fine, John Van Antwerp Jr. (1994) [1987]. The Late Medieval Balkans: A Critical Survey from the Late Twelfth Century to the Ottoman Conquest. Ann Arbor, Michigan: University of Michigan Press. ISBN 0-472-08260-4. Archived from the original on 15 January 2023.
- Fotić, Aleksandar (2008a). "Serbia". Encyclopedia of the Ottoman Empire. New York: Infobase Publishing. pp. 517–519. ISBN 978-1-4381-1025-7. Archived from the original on 14 January 2023.
- Fotić, Aleksandar (2008b). "Serbian Orthodox Church". Encyclopedia of the Ottoman Empire. New York: Infobase Publishing. pp. 519–520. ISBN 978-1-4381-1025-7. Archived from the original on 14 January 2023.
- Hoare, Marko Attila (2011). "The Partisans and the Serbs". In Ramet, Sabrina P.; Listhaug, Ola (eds.). Serbia and the Serbs in World War Two. London, England: Palgrave Macmillan. pp. 201–224. ISBN 978-0-23034-781-6.
- Halpern, Joel Martin (1956). Social and Cultural Change in a Serbian Village. Columbia University.
- Ivić, Pavle, ed. (1995). The History of Serbian Culture. Edgware: Porthill Publishers. ISBN 978-1-870732-31-4. Archived from the original on 27 September 2023.
- Jelavich, Barbara (1983a). History of the Balkans: Eighteenth and Nineteenth Centuries. Vol. 1. Cambridge University Press. ISBN 978-0-521-25249-2. Archived from the original on 23 January 2023.
- Jelavich, Barbara (1983b). History of the Balkans: Twentieth Century. Vol. 2. Cambridge University Press. ISBN 978-0-521-27459-3.
- Judah, Tim (2000). The Serbs: History, Myth and the Destruction of Yugoslavia. New Haven: Yale University Press. ISBN 978-0-300-08507-5. Archived from the original on 27 September 2023.
- Judah, Tim (2002). Kosovo: War and Revenge. New Haven: Yale University Press. ISBN 978-0-300-09725-2. Archived from the original on 11 January 2023.
- Katić, Tatjana (2012). Tursko osvajanje Srbije 1690. godine. Beograd: Srpski genealoški centar, Centar za osmanističke studije. Archived from the original on 5 April 2023.
- Komatina, Predrag (2014). "Settlement of the Slavs in Asia Minor During the Rule of Justinian II and the Bishopric των Γορδοσερβων" (PDF). Београдски историјски гласник: Belgrade Historical Review. 5: 33–42. Archived (PDF) from the original on 4 February 2022.
- Miller, Nicholas J. (1997). Between Nation and State: Serbian Politics in Croatia Before the First World War. Pittsburgh: University of Pittsburgh Press. ISBN 978-0-8229-3989-4.
- Miller, Nicholas J. (2005). "Serbia and Montenegro". Eastern Europe: An Introduction to the People, Lands, and Culture. Vol. 3. Santa Barbara, California: ABC-CLIO. pp. 529–581. ISBN 978-1-57607-800-6. Archived from the original on 21 January 2023.
- Nomachi, Motoki (2015). ""East" and "West" as Seen in the Structure of Serbian: Language Contact and Its Consequences" (PDF). Slavic Eurasian Studies. 28. Archived (PDF) from the original on 5 October 2023.
- Pavlowitch, Stevan K. (2002). Serbia: The History behind the Name. London: Hurst & Company. ISBN 978-1-85065-477-3. Archived from the original on 23 January 2023.
- Pavlowitch, Stevan K. (2008). Hitler's new disorder: The Second World War in Yugoslavia. New York: Columbia University Press. ISBN 978-0-231-70050-4. Archived from the original on 20 July 2023.
- Sollars, Michael David; Jennings, Arbolina Llamas (2008). The Facts on File Companion to the World Novel: 1900 to the Present. New York, NY: Infobase Publishing. ISBN 978-1-4381-0836-0. Archived from the original on 27 September 2023.
- Živković, Tibor; Bojanin, Stanoje; Petrović, Vladeta, eds. (2000). Selected Charters of Serbian Rulers (XII-XV Century): Relating to the Territory of Kosovo and Metohia. Athens: Center for Studies of Byzantine Civilisation.
- Живковић, Тибор (2000). Словени и Ромеји: Славизација на простору Србије од VII до XI века (The Slavs and the Romans). Београд: Историјски институт САНУ, Службени гласник. ISBN 978-86-7743-022-1. Archived from the original on 27 September 2023.
- Živković, Tibor (2002). Јужни Словени под византијском влашћу 600–1025 (South Slavs under the Byzantine Rule 600–1025). Београд: Историјски институт САНУ, Службени гласник. ISBN 978-86-7743-027-6. Archived from the original on 27 September 2023.
- Живковић, Тибор (2004). Црквена организација у српским земљама: Рани средњи век (Organization of the Church in Serbian Lands: Early Middle Ages). Београд: Историјски институт САНУ, Службени гласник. ISBN 978-86-7743-044-3. Archived from the original on 27 September 2023.
- Живковић, Тибор (2006). Портрети српских владара: IX-XII век (Portraits of Serbian Rulers: IX-XII Century). Београд: Завод за уџбенике и наставна средства. ISBN 978-86-17-13754-8.
- Živković, Tibor (2007). "The Golden Seal of Stroimir" (PDF). Historical Review. 55. Belgrade: The Institute for History: 23–29. Archived from the original (PDF) on 24 March 2018.
- Živković, Tibor (2008). Forging unity: The South Slavs between East and West 550–1150. Belgrade: The Institute of History, Čigoja štampa. ISBN 978-86-7558-573-2. Archived from the original on 27 September 2023.
- Živković, Tibor (2012). De conversione Croatorum et Serborum: A Lost Source. Belgrade: The Institute of History. Archived from the original on 13 February 2021.
- A ́goston, Ga ́bor; Masters, Bruce Alan (2010). Encyclopedia of the Ottoman Empire. Infobase Publishing. ISBN 978-1-4381-1025-7.
- Riley-Smith, Jonathan (2001). The Oxford Illustrated History of the Crusades. Oxford University Press. ISBN 978-0-19-285428-5.
- Rodriguez, Junius P. (1997). The Oxford Illustrated History of the Crusades. ABC-CLIO. ISBN 978-0-87436-885-7.
- Kia, Mehrdad (2011). Daily Life in the Ottoman Empire. ABC-CLIO. ISBN 978-0-313-33692-8.
- Yeomans, Rory (2015). The Utopia of Terror: Life and Death in Wartime Croatia. Boydell & Brewer. ISBN 978-1-58046-545-8. Archived from the original on 27 September 2023.
- Kallis, Aristotle (2008). Genocide and Fascism: The Eliminationist Drive in Fascist Europe. Routledge. ISBN 978-1-134-30034-1.
- Bartulin, Nevenko (2013). The Racial Idea in the Independent State of Croatia: Origins and Theory. BRILL. ISBN 978-90-04-26282-9.
- Charny, Israel (1999). Encyclopedia of Genocide: A-H. ABC-CLIO. ISBN 978-0-87436-928-1.
- Blagojević, Miloš (1989). Srbija U Doba Nemanjica: Od Knezevine Do Carstva: 1168-1371: Ilustrovana Hronika. TRZ "Vajat," IRO "Beograd," 1989. Archived from the original on 27 September 2023.
- Levy, Michele Frucht (2009). ""The Last Bullet for the Last Serb": The Ustaša Genocide against Serbs: 1941–1945". Nationalities Papers. 37 (6): 807–837. doi:10.1080/00905990903239174. S2CID 162231741.
- Dulić, Tomislav (2006). "Mass killing in the Independent State of Croatia, 1941–1945: a case for comparative research". Journal of Genocide Research. 8: 255–281. doi:10.1111/nana.12433. S2CID 242057219.
- Payne, Stanley G. (2006). "The NDH State in Comparative Perspective". Totalitarian Movements and Political Religions. 7 (4): 409–415. doi:10.1080/14690760600963198. S2CID 144782263.
