= Draginja Nadaždin =

Polish human rights activist of Serbian descent

- Born: July 23, 1975 (age 51); Mostar, Bosnia and Herzegovina
- Citizenship: Polish
- Education: University of Warsaw
- Occupation: activist for human rights
- Spouse: Maciej Niedźwiecki
- Children: 1
- Website: https://x.com/DNadazdin

Draginja Nadażdin (born Nadaždin, July 23, 1975) is a Serbian-Polish activist for human rights, and was the director of Amnesty International Poland (2007–2021).

== Early life ==
Draginja Nadażdin was born into a Serbian family in Mostar in today's Bosnia and Herzegovina. Due to the outbreak of the Bosnian war in 1992, she had to leave Mostar at the age of 17. She lived in Belgrade for two years. In 1994, she received a scholarship to study in Poland. She graduated from the Institute of Ethnology and Cultural Anthropology at the University of Warsaw. She also studied at the Human Rights School of the Helsinki Foundation for Human Rights, as well as the Leadership Academy for Poland. She wrote a doctorate on the citizenship laws of former Yugoslav states at the School of Social Sciences of the Polish Academy of Sciences.

Among other things, she worked in the Polish humanitarian action. In 2007, she became the director of Amnesty International Poland; In 2015, she became part of the Regional Group overseeing artificial intelligence (AI) activities in Europe. She left the position of director of AI Poland in September 2021. From 2013 to 2016, she was a member of the Program Council of the Zachęta National Gallery. She was also a member of the Social Council at the Ombudsman and the Board of the National Federation of Non-Governmental Organizations in 2019.

She has a daughter with her husband Maciej Niedźwiecki.

== Medals ==
On September 8, 2014, she was awarded the Golden Cross of Merit "for merits in activities for the development of civil society in Poland, for achievements in professional and social work undertaken for the benefit of the country".

On July 15, 2021, she was awarded the honorary badge ‘For Merits in the Protection of Human Rights’ by Ombudsman Adam Bodnar.
