= Stefan Nikolić =

Stefan Nikolić may refer to:

- Stefan Nikolić (basketball, born 1987), Serbian basketball player (Bulgaria, Greece, Germany, France, Romania, Slovenia)
- Stefan Nikolić (footballer, born 1990), Montenegrin footballer
- Stefan Nikolić (footballer, born 1994), Serbian footballer
- Stefan Nikolić (basketball, born 1997), Serbian basketball player (Virtus Bologna)
- Stefan Nikolić (rugby league), member of the Serbia national rugby league team
