= Miloš M. Nikolić =

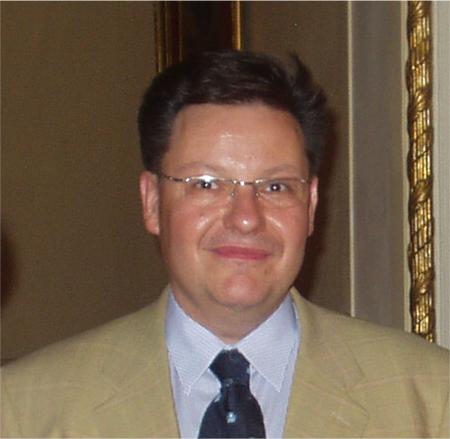

Miloš M. Nikolić (born 1961, Belgrade) is the Professor and Chairman, Department of Dermatology and Venereology, University of Belgrade School of Medicine. M. Nikolić was the Head of the Clinic of Dermatology and Venereology, University Clinical Center of Serbia, Belgrade and Head of the Division of Pediatric and Adolescent Dermatology. He was the Secretary (1990–1994) and the President (2001–2005) of the Dermatovenereology Section of the Serbian Medical Society. He was the President of the Serbian Association of Dermatovenereologists from 2011 to 2015. He was a member of the Board of Directors of the European Academy of Dermatology and Venereology (EADV) 2014-2019. Chairman of the Honours and Awards Committee of the EADV 2019-2023. Chairman of the Statutes and Development Committee of the EADV since 2023. Member of the Board of the European Society for Pediatric Dermatology (ESPD) 2004-2022. Associate Editor of the journal Dermatologic Therapy since 2022.

The main fields of interest and work of M. Nikolić are vasculitides, connective tissue diseases (especially lupus erythematosus), autoimmune bullous diseases and alopecia areata. He has authored or co-authored over 360 scientific papers, of which more than 80 in journals indexed in Science Citation Index (SCI), as well as many book chapters and several books. Published papers have been cited more than 2000 times. H-index 25, i10-index 48. He is the main researcher in scientific projects financed by the Serbian Ministry of Science and a collaborator in several international scientific projects. M. Nikolić was a speaker and the chair in numerous sessions in many international (European, Euro-Asian, World) and national congresses and symposia.
