= Miloš Nikolić (footballer, born 1987) =

Serbian footballer

Personal information
- Full name: Miloš Nikolić
- Date of birth: 26 January 1987 (age 39)
- Place of birth: Pirot, FR Yugoslavia
- Height: 1.88 m (6 ft 2 in)
- Position: Centre-back

Youth career
- Radnički Pirot

Senior career*
Years	Team	Apps	(Gls)
2003–2009	Radnički Pirot	40	(1)
2006	→ Car Konstantin (loan)		
2010–2011	Sinđelić Niš	3	(0)
2011	→ Radnički Pirot (loan)		
2011–2018	Radnički Pirot	175	(11)
- * Club domestic league appearances and goals as of 31 May 2019

Miloš Nikolić (Serbian Cyrillic: Милош Николић; born 26 January 1987) is a Serbian retired football defender.
