= Serbian Orthodox Eparchy of Britain and Scandinavia =

Former diocese of the Serbian Orthodox Church

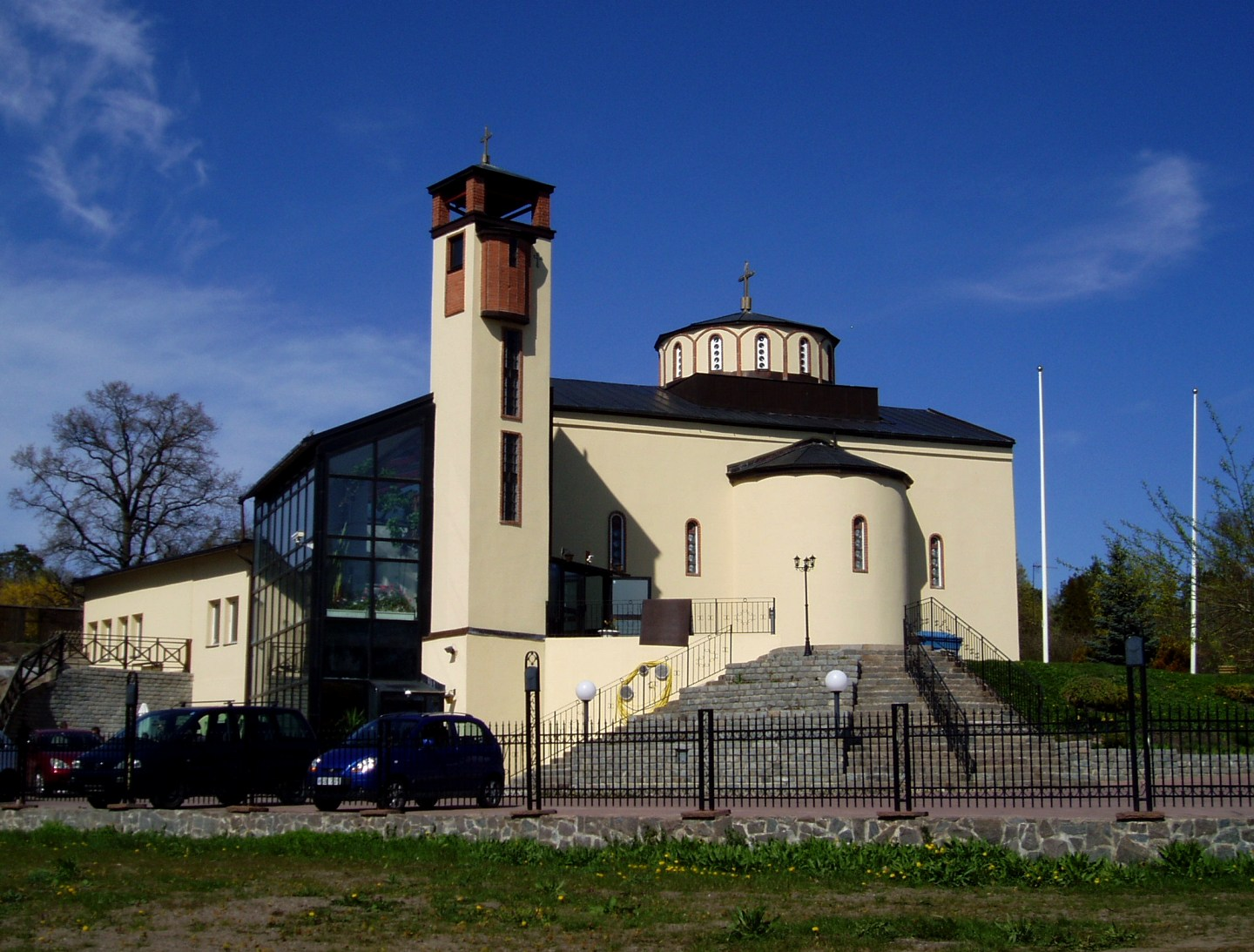
- Saint Sava Cathedral, Stockholm, seat of the Diocese

Location
- Territory: United Kingdom, Denmark, Norway, Sweden, Finland, Iceland, Ireland
- Headquarters: Stockholm, Sweden

Information
- Denomination: Eastern Orthodox
- Sui iuris church: Serbian Orthodox Church
- Established: 1990
- Dissolved: 2024
- Cathedral: Saint Sava Cathedral, Stockholm
- Language: Church Slavonic, Serbian

Leadership
- Bishop: Dositej Motika

The Serbian Orthodox Eparchy of Britain and Scandinavia or Serbian Orthodox Diocese of Britain and Scandinavia (Serbian: Српска православна епархија британско-скандинавска) was a Serbian Orthodox Church diocese in Western Europe. It was headquartered at Enskede gård, Stockholm, Sweden. It operated churches in Denmark, Finland, Iceland, Norway, Sweden, and the United Kingdom. Missionary parishes in Ireland and Malta were operated by priests from England. This diocese ceased to exist in May 2024 when the Holy Council of the Serbian Orthodox Church decided to split it in two: the Eparchy of Britain and Ireland and the Eparchy of Scandinavia.

== See also ==
- Eastern Orthodoxy in Norway
- Eastern Orthodoxy in Sweden
- Eastern Orthodoxy in the Republic of Ireland
- Assembly of Canonical Orthodox Bishops of Scandinavia
- Assembly of Canonical Orthodox Bishops of Great Britain and Ireland
- Serbs in the United Kingdom
- Serbs in Sweden
- Serbs in Norway
- Serbs in Denmark

== Gallery ==
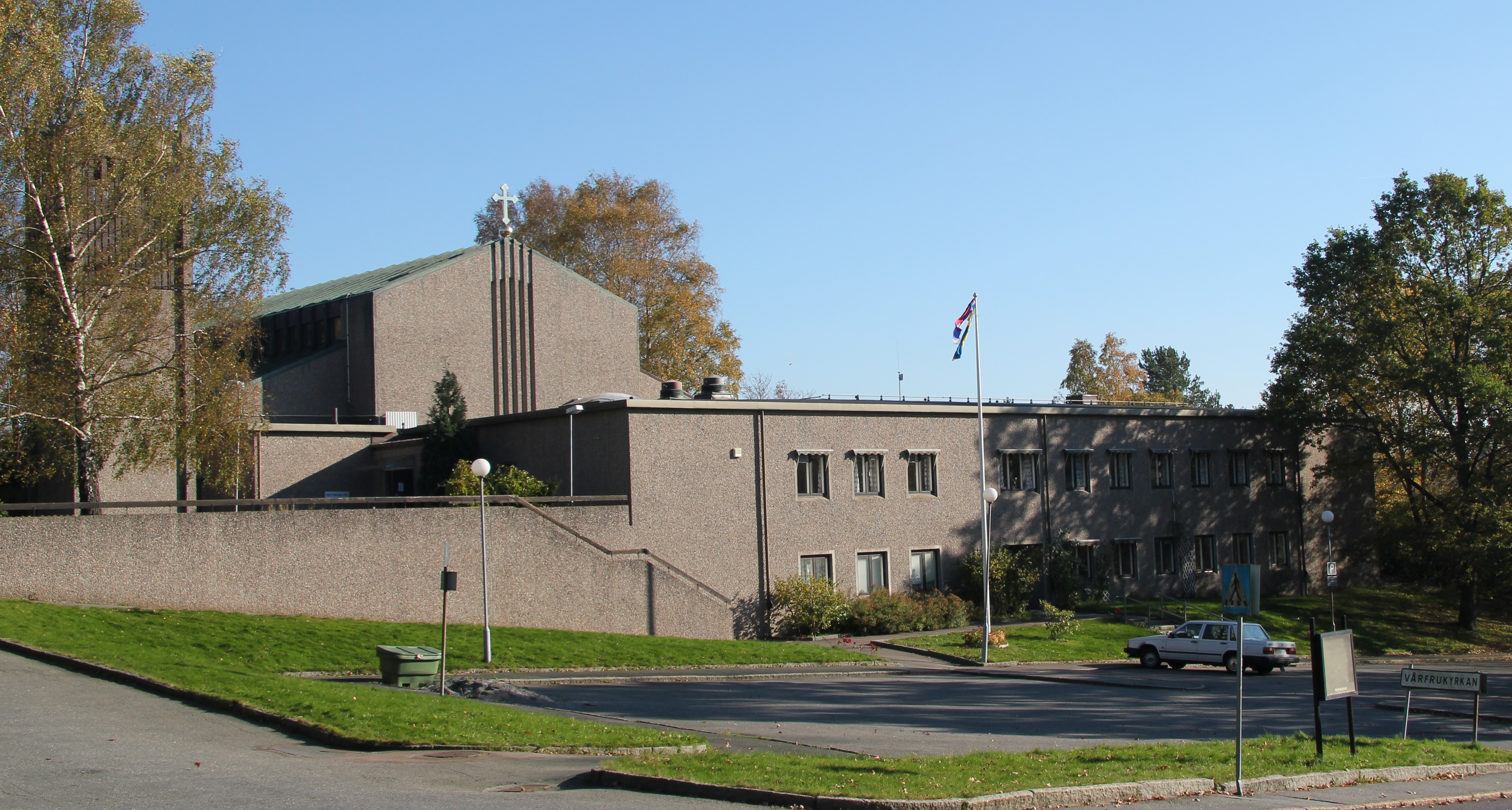
Church of Our Lady, Gothenburg

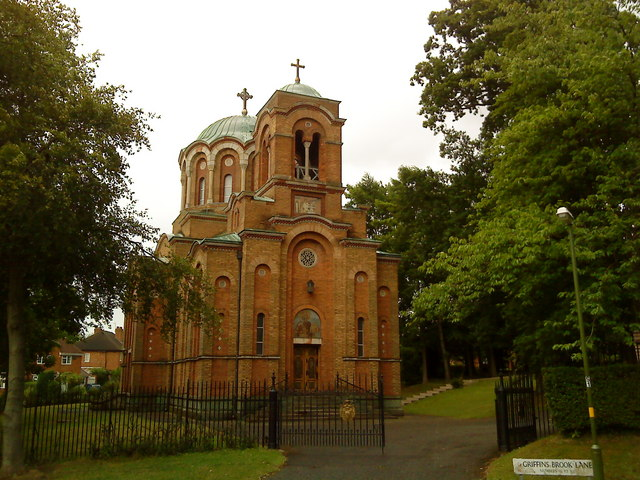
Church of St Lazar, Bournville, Birmingham

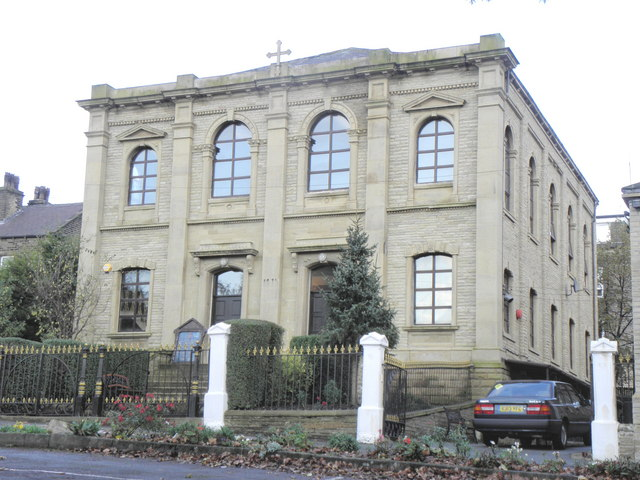
Serbian Church, Boothtown

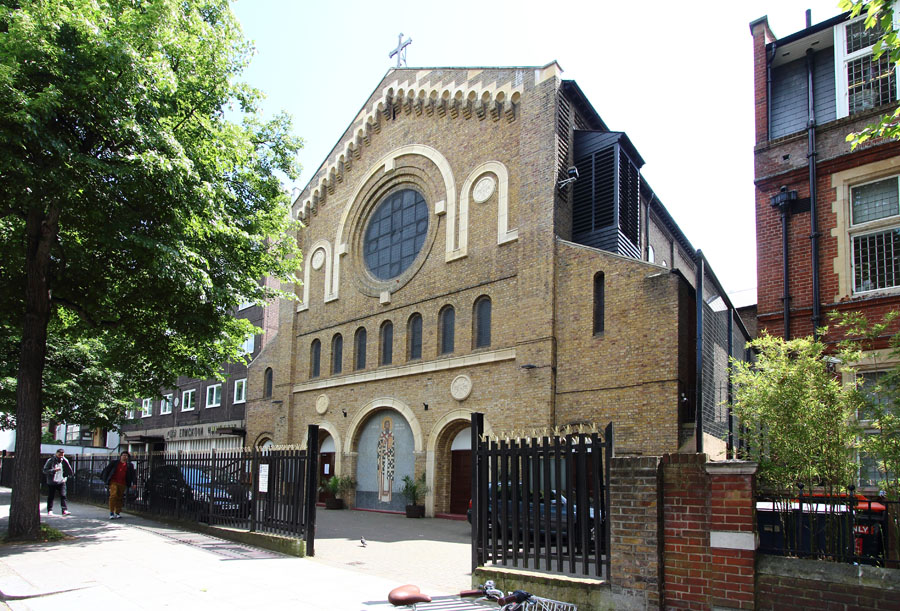
Church of St Sava, off Ladbroke Grove, London
