= List of cathedrals in Sweden =

The following is a list of cathedrals in Sweden.

A cathedral church is a Christian place of worship which is the chief, or 'mother' church of a diocese and is distinguished as such by being the location for the cathedra or bishop's seat. In the strictest sense, only those Christian denominations with an episcopal hierarchy possess cathedrals. However the label 'cathedral' remains in common parlance for notable churches which were formerly part of an episcopal denomination.

== Church of Sweden ==
=== Province of Uppsala ===
Image	Name & Dedication	Diocese	Established/Website/Location
	Gothenburg Cathedral; Göteborgs domkyrka / Gustavi domkyrka	Diocese of Gothenburg	1815 (1633)
			57.7045°N 11.965°E
	Härnösand Cathedral; Härnösands domkyrka	Diocese of Härnösand	1846
			62°37′52″N 17°56′30″E
	Karlstad Cathedral; Karlstads domkyrka	Diocese of Karlstad	1730
			59°22′53.3″N 13°30′25.6″E
	Linköping Cathedral; Linköpings domkyrka	Diocese of Linköping	c. 1120
			58°24′41″N 15°37′02″E
	Luleå Cathedral; Luleå domkyrka / Oscar Fredriks kyrka	Diocese of Luleå	1893
	former parish church		65°34′57.8″N 22°08′56.5″E
	Lund Cathedral; Lunds domkyrka	Diocese of Lund	c. 1100
			55°42′15″N 13°11′35″E
	Skara Cathedral; Skara domkyrka	Diocese of Skara	c.1000
			58.3865°N 13.4393°E
	Storkyrkan; Storkyrkan / Sankt Nikolai kyrka	Diocese of Stockholm	1279
			59°19′33″N 18°04′14″E
	Strängnäs Cathedral; Strängnäs domkyrka	Diocese of Strängnäs	1296
			59°22′35″N 17°02′07″E
	Uppsala Cathedral; Uppsala domkyrka	Diocese of Uppsala	c.1300
	Seat of the Archbishop of the Church of Sweden.		59°51′29.27″N 17°38′0.88″E
	Visby Cathedral; Visby domkyrka / Sankta Maria kyrka	Diocese of Visby	1225
			57°38′30″N 18°17′51″E
	Västerås Cathedral; Västerås domkyrka	Diocese of Västerås	c. 1150
			59°36′45″N 16°32′30″E
	Växjö Cathedral; Växjö domkyrka	Diocese of Växjö	c. 1300
			56.8774°N 14.8121°E

== Catholic Church ==
=== Province of Stockholm ===
Image	Name & Dedication	Diocese	Established/Website/Location
	Saint Eric's Cathedral, Stockholm; Stockholms katolska domkyrka / Sankt Eriks katolska domkyrka	Diocese of Stockholm	1892
	Cathedral expanded in 1983.		59.31377°N 18.07234°E

== Greek Orthodox Church ==
=== Metropolis of Sweden and all Scandinavia ===
Image	Name & Dedication	Diocese	Established/Website/Location
	Greek Orthodox Church of St George, Stockholm; Sankt Georgios kyrka, Stockholm	Greek Orthodox Metropolis of Sweden and all Scandinavia.	1969

== Serbian Orthodox Church ==
=== Serbian Orthodox Eparchy of Scandinavia ===
Image	Name & Dedication	Diocese	Established/Website/Location
	Saint Sava Serbian Orthodox Cathedral, Stockholm; Sankt Sava serbisk-ortodoxa kyrka	Serbian Orthodox Eparchy of Scandinavia, Enskede gård.	1991

== Syriac Orthodox Church ==
In Sweden there are two separate Syriac Orthodox Dioceses, each with its own bishop, both based in Södertälje.

=== Syriac Orthodox Archdiocese of Sweden and Scandinavia ===
Image	Name & Dedication	Diocese	Established/Website/Location
	Saint Jacob of Nsibin Syriac Orthodox Cathedral; Sankt Jacob av Nsibin syrisk-ortodoxa katedral	Syriac Orthodox Archdiocese of Sweden and Scandinavia, Södertälje	2009

=== Syriac Orthodox Patriarchate's Representation in Sweden ===
Image	Name & Dedication	Diocese	Established/Website/Location
	Saint Afram Syriac Orthodox Cathedral; Sankt Aframs kyrka	Syriac Orthodox Patriarchate's Representation in Sweden, Södertälje	1983

== See also ==
- List of cathedrals
- List of abbeys and priories in Sweden
- List of tallest church towers
- Religion in Sweden
