= Norway–Yugoslavia relations =

Norway-Yugoslavia relations
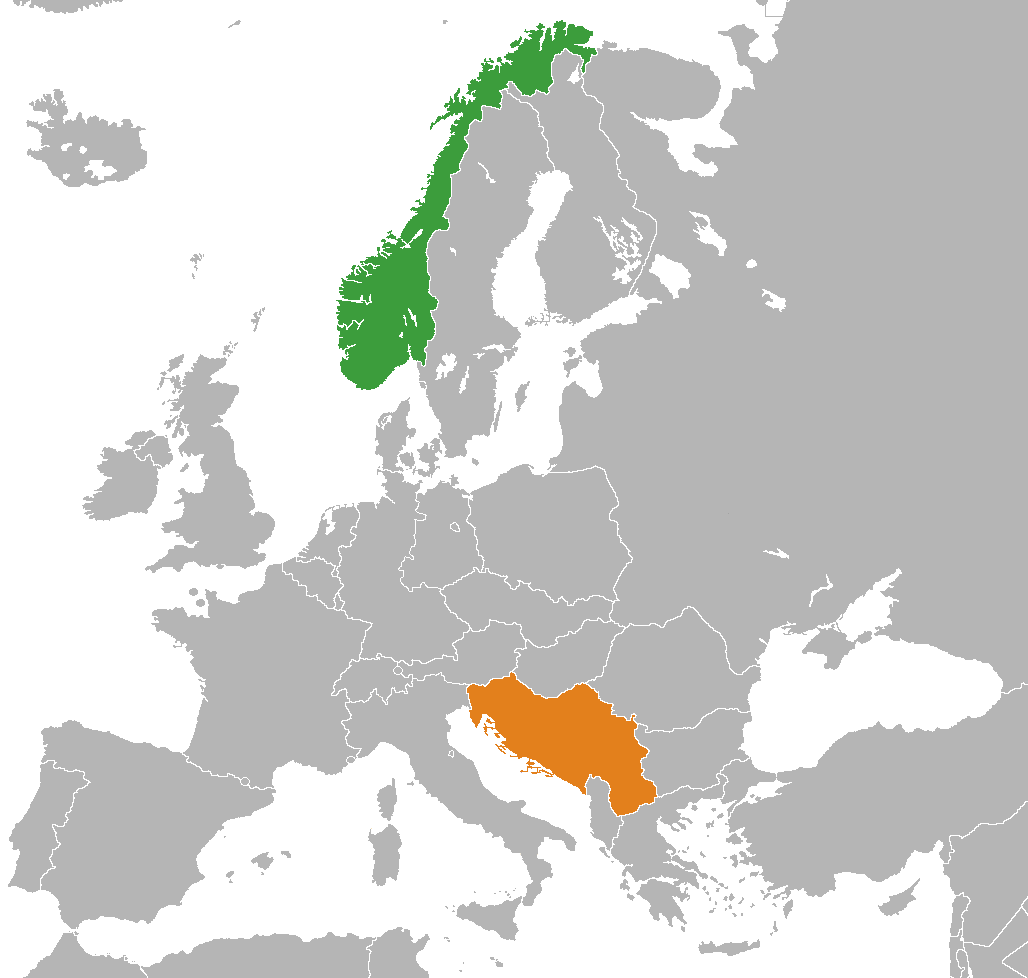

- Norway: Yugoslavia

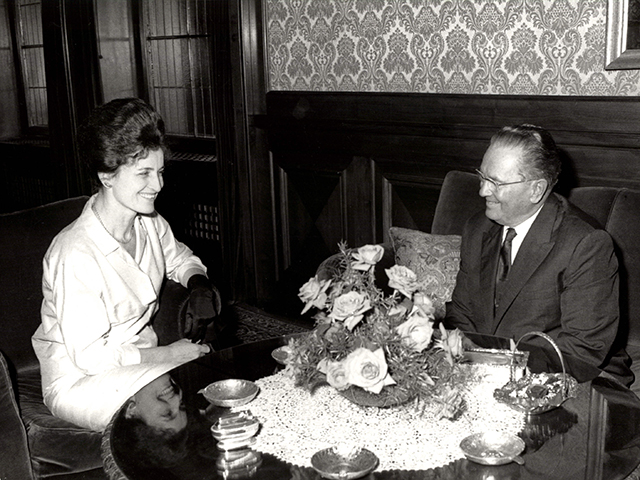
Yugoslav ambasador to Norway Stana Tomašević with President of Yugoslavia Josip Broz Tito in Belgrade in 1963

Norway–Yugoslavia relations (Norwegian: Forholdet mellom Norge og Jugoslavia; Serbo-Croatian: Norveško-jugoslavenski odnosi, Норвешко-југословенски односи; Slovene: Odnosi med Norveško in Jugoslavijo; Macedonian: Односите Норвешка-Југославија) were historical foreign relations between Norway and now split-up Yugoslavia (both Kingdom of Yugoslavia or Socialist Federal Republic of Yugoslavia).

Following the 1948 Tito-Stalin split, the two countries intensified their cooperation including in the intelligence field. The Yugoslav envoy in Oslo approached the Norwegian intelligence community and asked if the Norwegian side was interested in an exchange of intelligence. This proposal was accepted by Norwegian Defense Minister Nils Langhelle.

In 1972 two countries signed the Convention on Social Insurance and in 1983 Convention against double taxation.

Following the dissolution of Yugoslavia and the Yugoslav Wars Professor of Political Science at the Norwegian University of Science and Technology, Sabrina P. Ramet, wrote the influential book Thinking about Yugoslavia in which she provided a survey of the major academic debates and interpretations of the region and the conflict. Norwegian judge Ole Bjørn Støle served as an ad litem judge at the International Criminal Tribunal for the former Yugoslavia.

== History ==
=== Interwar period ===
On 26 January 1919 Minister of Foreign Affairs of Norway Nils Claus Ihlen answered the letter sent by the Minister of Foreign Affairs of Yugoslavia Ante Trumbić of 18 January 1919 in which Ihlen confirmed Norwegian willingness to establish formal relations with the newly established Kingdom of Serbs, Croats and Slovenes. Norway was the first country which recognized the new Kingdom of Serbs, Croats and Slovenes. While the pre-World War I Kingdom of Serbia operated its delegation in Norway, the new country was forced to close its embassy due to the savings efforts and the need to focus on the country's reconstruction.

=== World War II ===
Beginning in March 1942, during World War II in Yugoslavia, German authorities deported a total of 4268 prisoners from Yugoslavia to Norway where they were supposed to work as slave labor. Out of 4268 prisoners, 2287 or 53.58% were from German-occupied areas of Serbia. Almost all detainees from Serbia were Serbs, while among the remaining 1981 prisoners there were 1620 (81.78%) Serbs, 179 (9.03%) Muslims, 165 (8.32%) Croats, and 17 (0.85%) other. Approximately 60% of Yugoslav prisoners of war died in concentration camps, a proportion which was significantly higher than for example 10% of Soviets and 0.6% of Polish prisoners in Norway. In 1947 the Norwegian justice court reaffirmed that Yugoslav prisoners were put in pure concentration camps, created with the aim of the systematic extermination. Some Norwegians were imprisoned in a subcamp of the Mauthausen concentration camp at the Ljubelj Pass in German-occupied Yugoslavia.

=== Cold War period ===
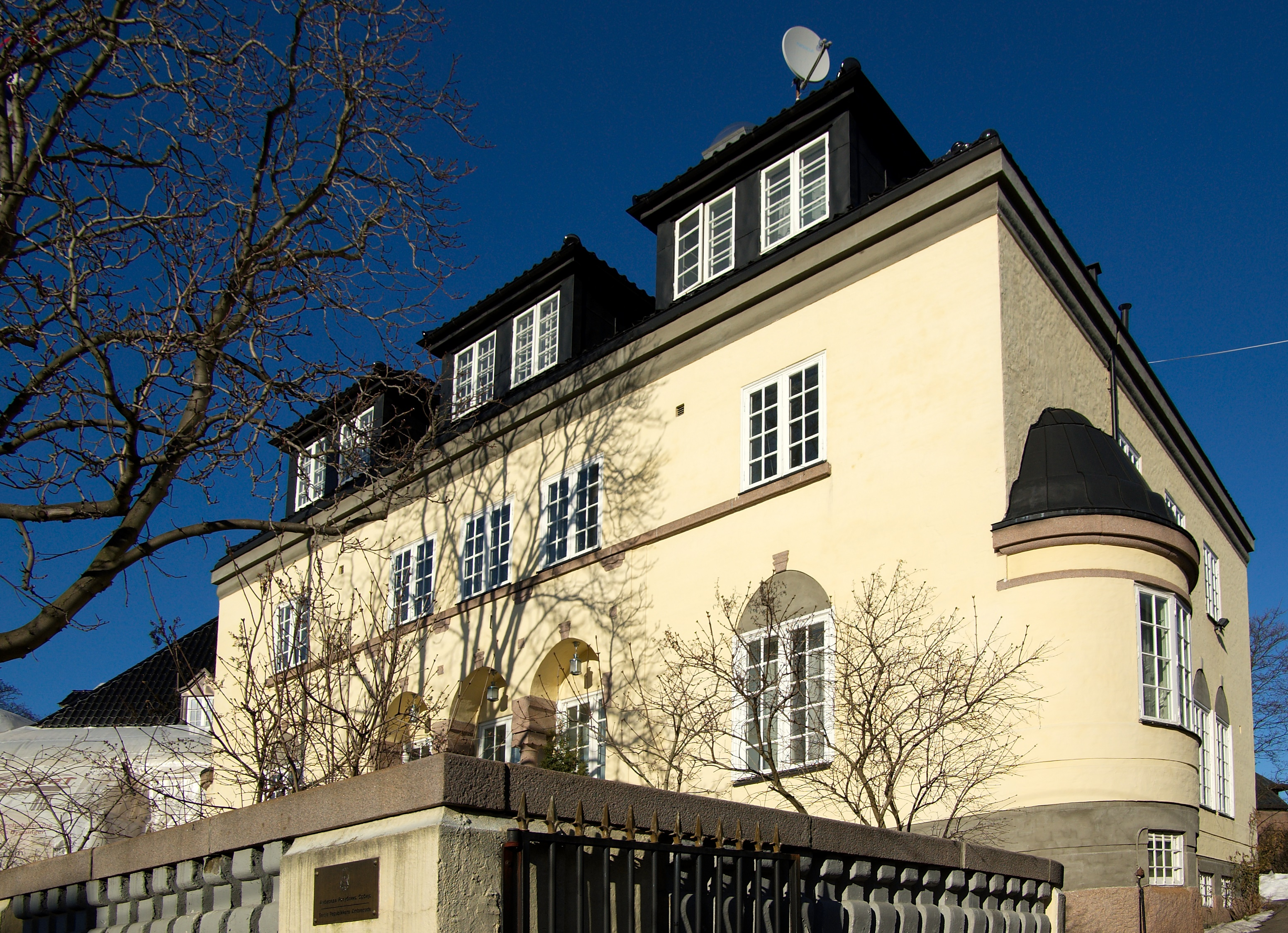
Former Embassy of Yugoslavia in Oslo. Following the breakup of Yugoslavia initially the Embassy of Serbia and Montenegro and Serbia, following the agreement on Yugoslav property turned into the Embassy of Bosnia and Herzegovina in 2013.

Following the 1948 Tito-Stalin split, Yugoslavia developed its relations with a number of Western and third world countries. Despite improved and intensified cooperation between the two countries, Belgrade put its focus on the development of its Scandinavian relations with neutral Finland and partially with Sweden. The experience of Finlandization directly affected the Yugoslav decision to develop its relations with Non-Aligned Countries as it perceived that there was a narrowing space for non-Bloc countries in European politics.

== Cultural cooperation ==
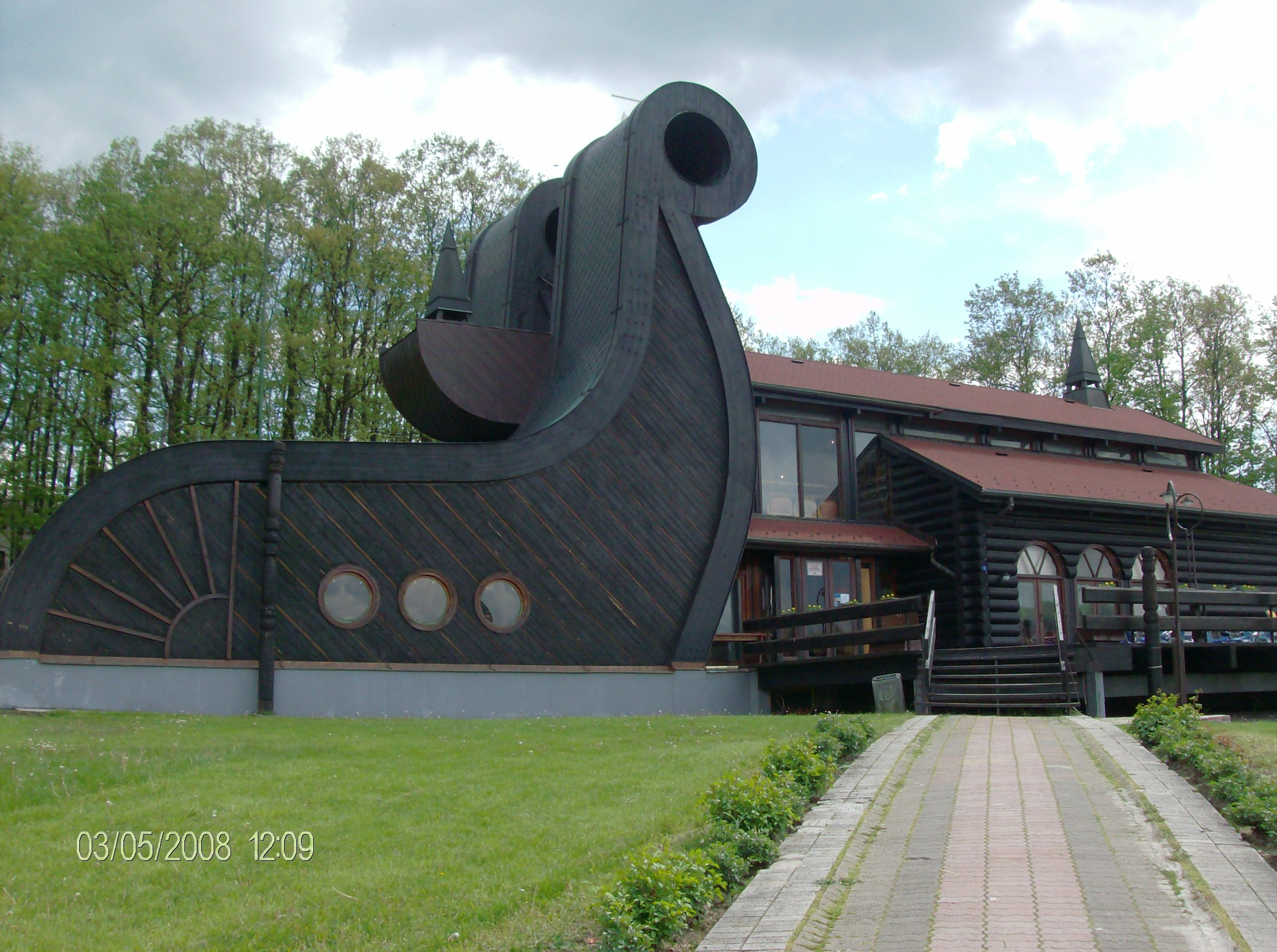
Norwegian house in Gornji Milanovac, Serbia.

The University of Belgrade established Norwegian lectureship in 1977 while the Department of Scandinavian Language and Literature at the same university was established in 1988. The Norwegian House in Gornji Milanovac in the Socialist Republic of Serbia was opened in 1987.

== See also ==
- Yugoslavia–European Communities relations
- Croatia–Norway relations
- Norway–Serbia relations
- Czechoslovakia–Norway relations
- Yugoslav government-in-exile
- Nygaardsvold's Cabinet
- Dissolution of the union between Norway and Sweden
- Breakup of Yugoslavia
- Serbs in Norway
- Death and state funeral of Josip Broz Tito
- Yugoslavia at the 1952 Winter Olympics
- Norway at the 1984 Winter Olympics
- Yugoslavia in the Eurovision Song Contest 1986
- Norway in the Eurovision Song Contest 1990
