= Saint George Monastery, Olofström =

Serbian Orthodox monastery in Olofström, Sweden

Saint George Monastery
- Манастир светог великомученика Георгија у Олофстрему
- Monastery of Saint George in Olofström

- Location within Sweden

Monastery information
- Full name: Monastery and Parish of Saint George the Great Martyr in Olofström
- Other names: Serbian Orthodox Monastery of Saint George, Olofström
- Order: Serbian Orthodox
- Denomination: Eastern Orthodox
- Established: 2009
- Dedication: Saint George the Great Martyr
- Diocese: Serbian Orthodox Eparchy of Britain and Scandinavia

People
- Founder: Bishop Dositej
- Abbot: Nektarije (Samardžić)

Site
- Location: Olofström
- Country: Sweden
- Coordinates: 56.2779°N 14.5347°E
- Website: https://manastirulofstrom.se/

Saint George Monastery (Serbian: Манастир светог великомученика Георгија у Олофстрему, romanized: Manastir svetog velikomučenika Georgija u Olofströmu), officially the Monastery of Saint George the Great Martyr, is a Serbian Orthodox monastery under the Eparchy of Britain and Scandinavia, located in Olofström, Sweden.

It is the first male monastery of the Serbian Orthodox Church in Sweden. It was founded on 3 May 2009 with the blessing of Bishop Dositej of Britain and Scandinavia.

On 10 September 2011, Protosinghel Nektarije was appointed abbot of the monastery.
