= Serbian Orthodox Eparchy of Scandinavia =

Diocese of the Serbian Orthodox Church

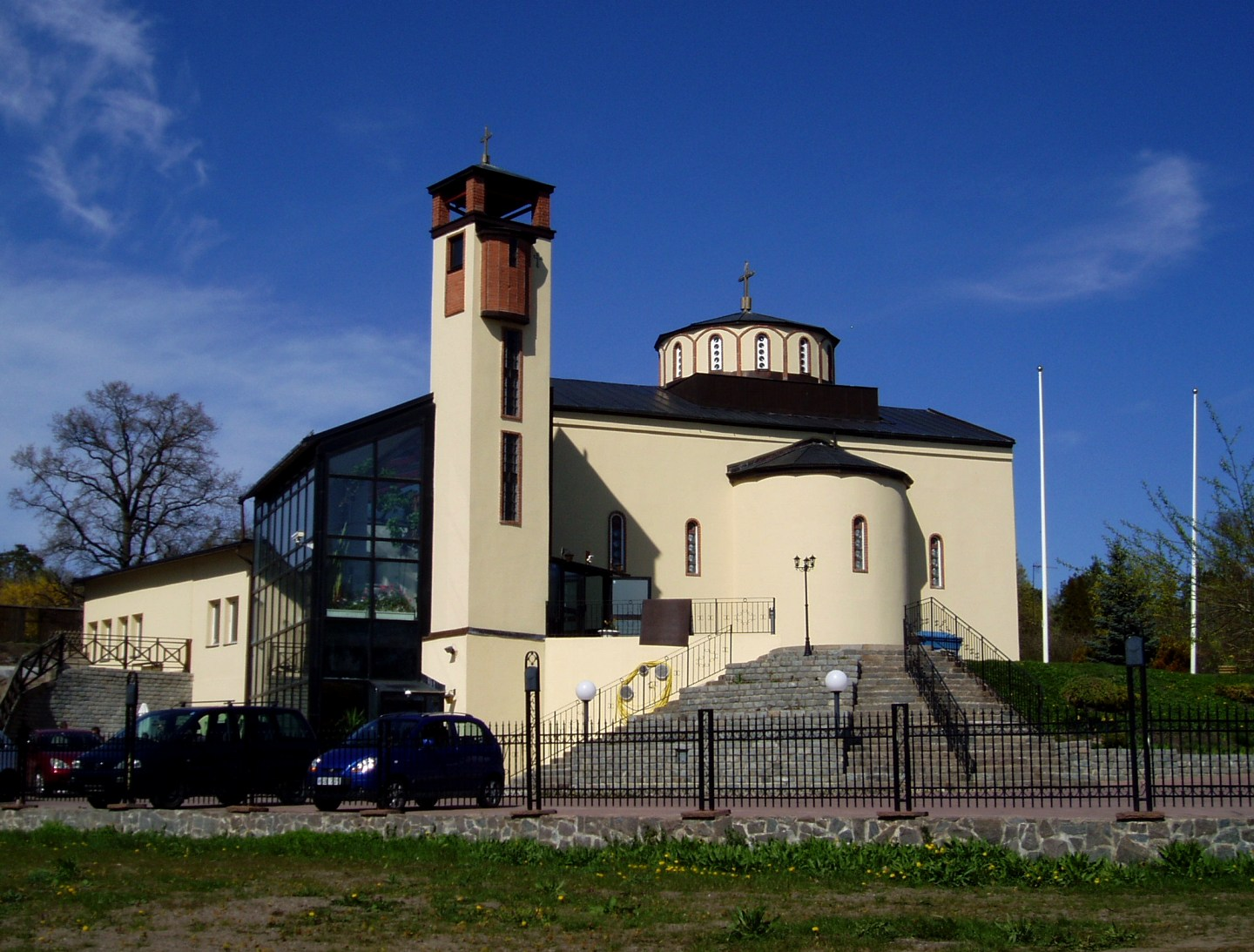
- Saint Sava Cathedral, Stockholm

Location
- Territory: Denmark, Finland, Iceland, Norway, and Sweden
- Headquarters: Enskede gård, Stockholm, Sweden

Information
- Denomination: Eastern Orthodox
- Sui iuris church: Serbian Orthodox Church
- Established: 1990 (as Britain and Scandinavia); 2024 (as Scandinavia)
- Cathedral: Saint Sava Cathedral, Stockholm, Sweden
- Language: Church Slavonic, Serbian

Current leadership
- Bishop: Dositej Motika

Map

The Serbian Orthodox Eparchy of Scandinavia (Serbian: Српска православна епархија скандинавска, romanized: Srpska pravoslavna eparhija skandinavska) is a diocese (eparchy) of the Serbian Orthodox Church, covering Denmark, Finland, Iceland, Norway, and Sweden.

== History ==
The Eparchy of Scandinavia was established in 2024 after splitting the existing Eparchy of Britain and Scandinavia in two - creating separate Eparchy of Scandinavia and Eparchy of Britain and Ireland. Dositej Motika was appointed the first bishop of the diocese, enthroned in 2024.

== Structure ==
The Serbian Orthodox Eparchy of Scandinavia comprises 13 parishes, of which 10 in Sweden, one each in Norway and Denmark, and one missionary parish each in Finland and Iceland. The episcopal see is located at the Saint Sava Cathedral in Stockholm.

It also has three parishes of Orthodox Swedes, one monastery and two monastery estates.

== Gallery ==
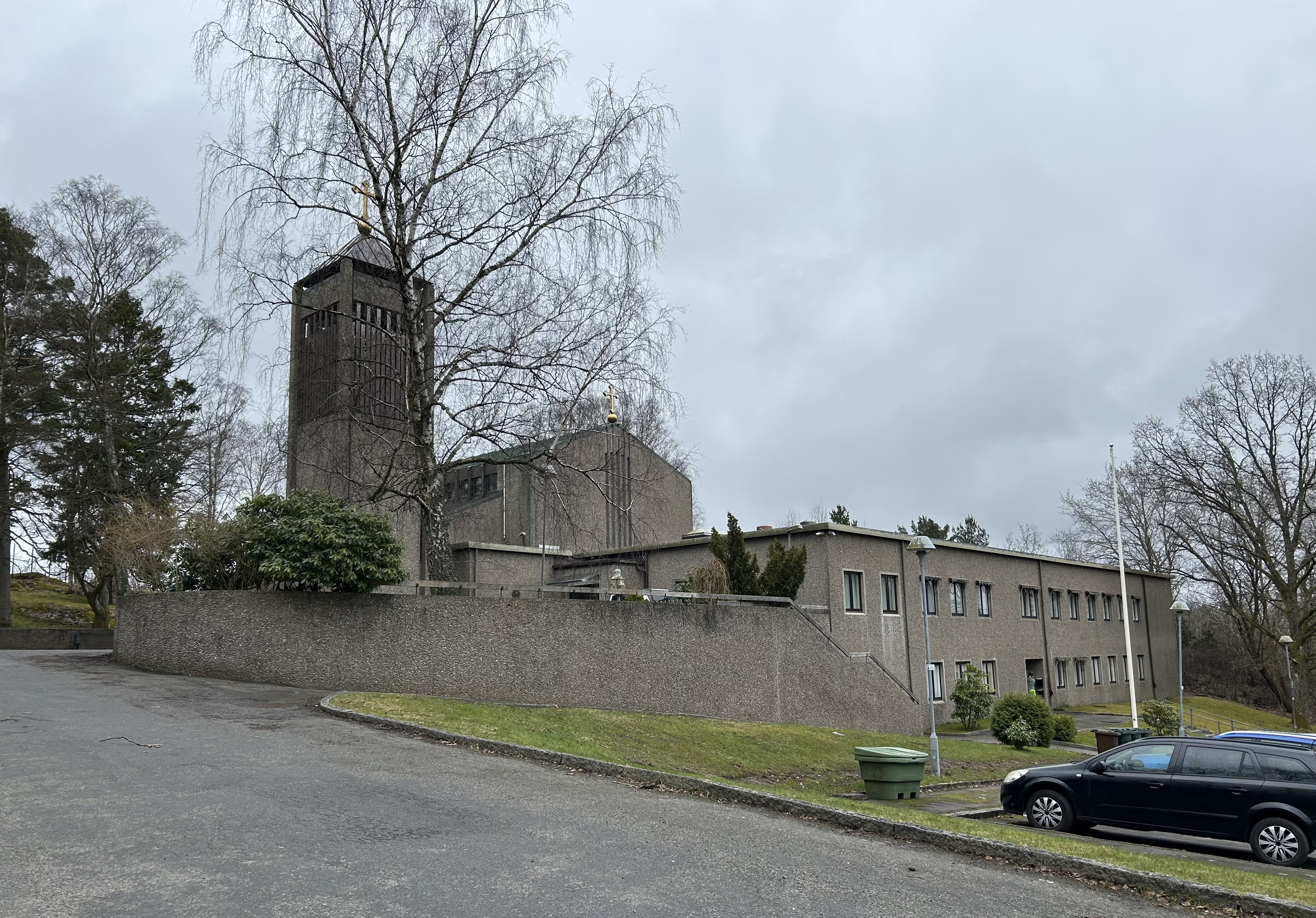
Saint Stefan Dečanski Church (Gothenburg, Sweden)

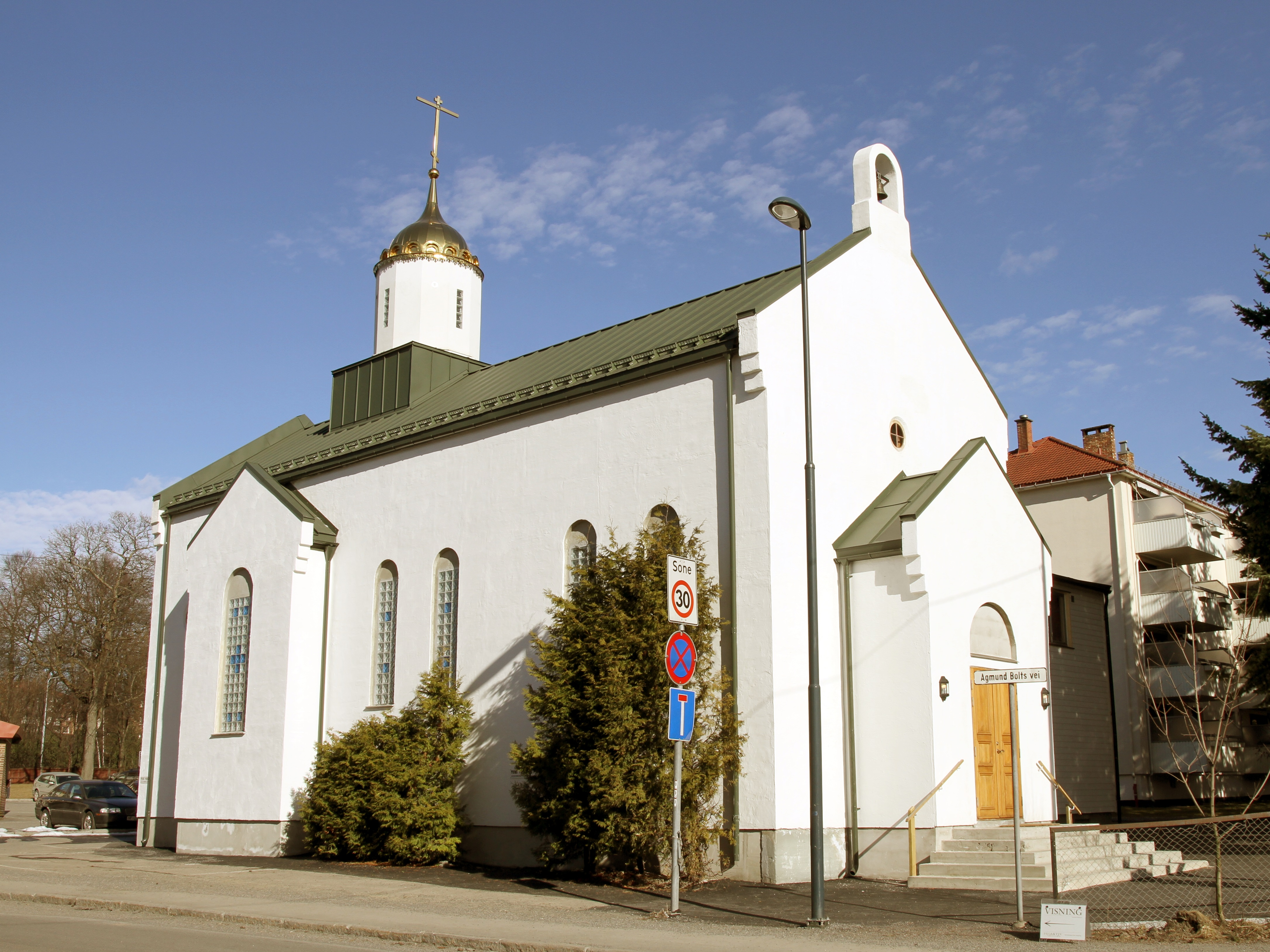
Saint Nicholas Church (Oslo, Norway)

== See also ==
- Assembly of Canonical Orthodox Bishops of Scandinavia
- Eparchies and metropolitanates of the Serbian Orthodox Church
- Serbs in Sweden
- Serbs in Norway
- Serbs in Denmark
