= Serbs in Sweden =

Svenskserber Срби у Шведској Srbi u Švedskoj
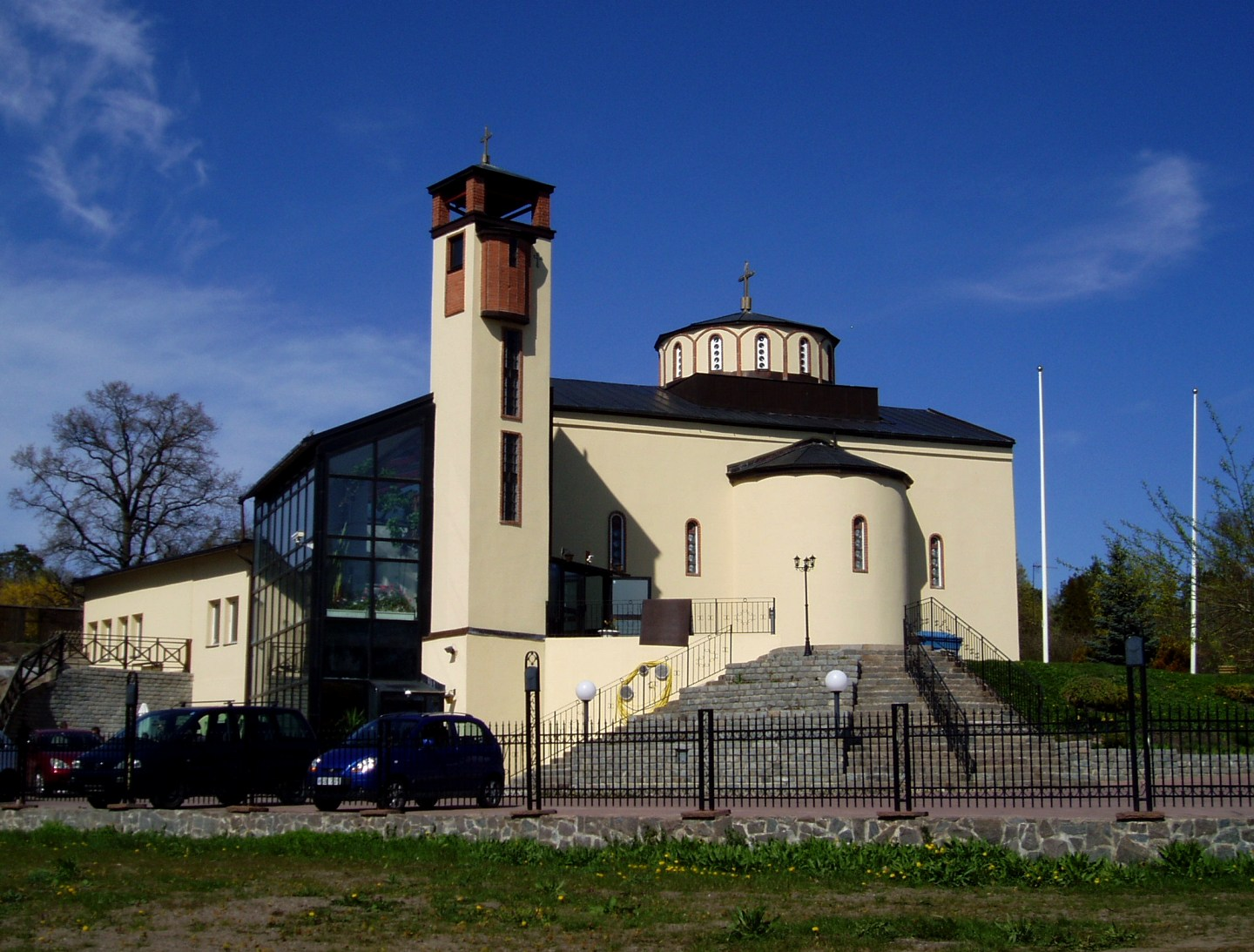
- Saint Sava Serbian Orthodox Cathedral in Stockholm

Total population
- 17,909 Serbia-born residents (2024) ~80,000 of Serb ancestry (est.)

Regions with significant populations
- Stockholm, Gothenburg, Malmö

Languages
- Swedish and Serbian

Religion
- Eastern Orthodoxy (Serbian Orthodox Church)

Related ethnic groups
- Serbs in Norway, Serbs in Denmark

Serbs in Sweden are Swedish citizens of ethnic Serb descent and/or Serbia-born persons living in Sweden. According to data from 2024, there were 17,909 Serbia-born people living in Sweden, while estimated number of people of Serb ethnic descent (including both full or partial descent) stands at around 80,000.

== History ==
The first major wave of Serb immigration to Sweden took place in the 1960s. This was a period when Sweden was in need of labour and in 1964 the visa requirement for Yugoslavia citizens was removed. As a result, Serbs and other ethnic groups from Yugoslavia (Croats, Macedonians, and others) immigrated to Sweden. Serbian (and Yugoslav) labour immigration declined during the late 1970s when recession hit the Swedish economy and the need for labour decreased.

Bosnian Serbs and Croatian Serbs migrated in another wave during and after the Yugoslav Wars. A third wave, that of Kosovo Serbs, came in the aftermath the Kosovo War in 1999.

== Culture ==
The Serbs in Sweden are bilingual and the Serbian language is a rich contributor to the so-called Rinkeby Swedish, a sociolect of the Swedish language.

They predominantly belong to the Eastern Orthodoxy with the Serbian Orthodox Church as the traditional church and its diocese, Serbian Orthodox Eparchy of Scandinavia. In 1972, the first Serbian Orthodox parishes (of Saint Nicholas) was formed in Västerås, prior to the forming that same year a parish in Malmö (of Saints Cyrils and Methodius) and in 1973 one in Stockholm (of Saint Sava). Later, parishes have been formed in Göteborg (of Stefan Dečanski), Jönköping (of Theotokos), Helsingborg (of Saint Basil the Great), and one more in Stockholm. In 1982, the Church of Saints Cyril and Methodius was opened in Malmo, the first Serbian Orthodox church in Sweden. The parish of Saint Sava opened its church, which became cathedral of the diocese, in Enskede in 1983; the parish in Göteborg also has a church.

== Notable people ==
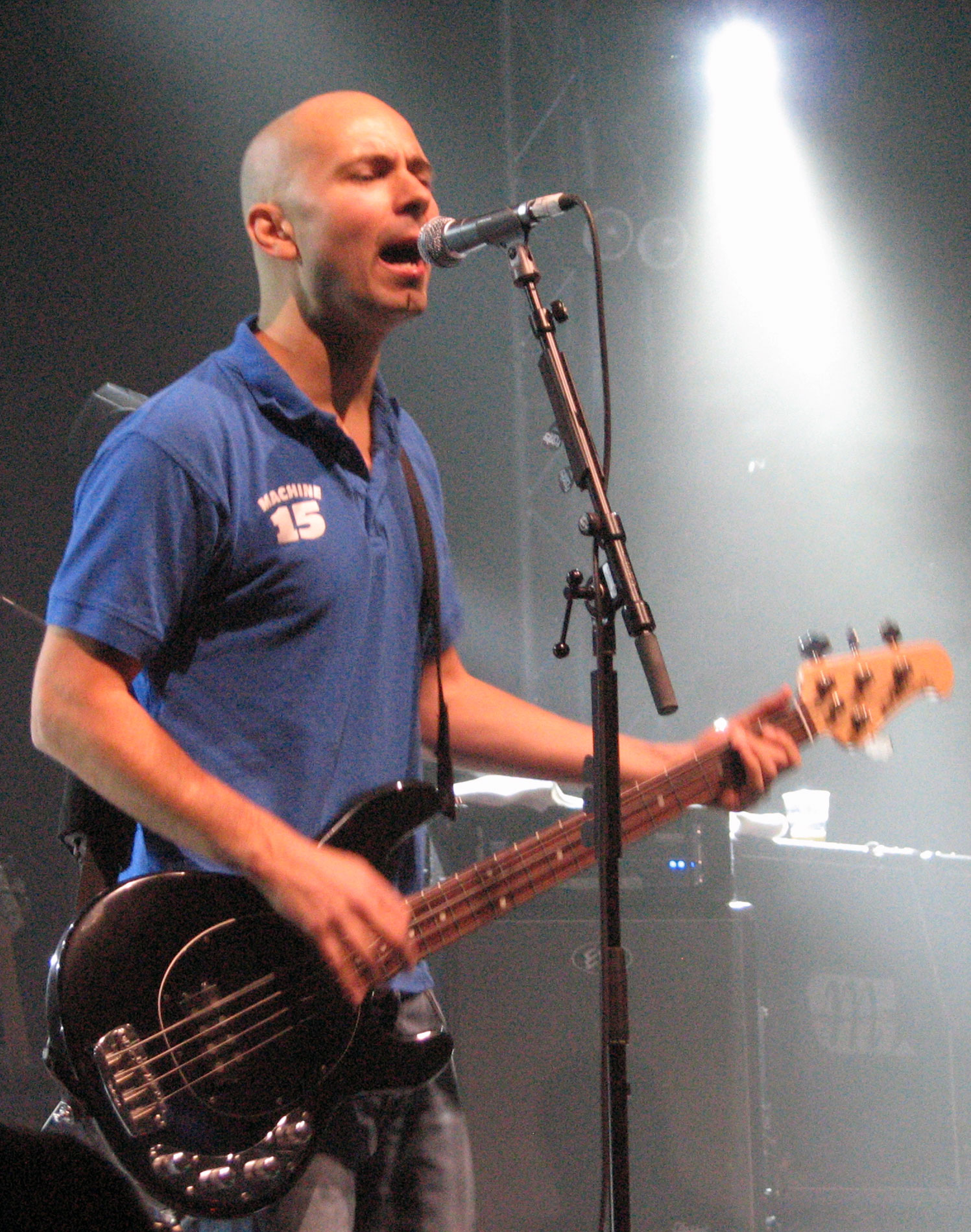
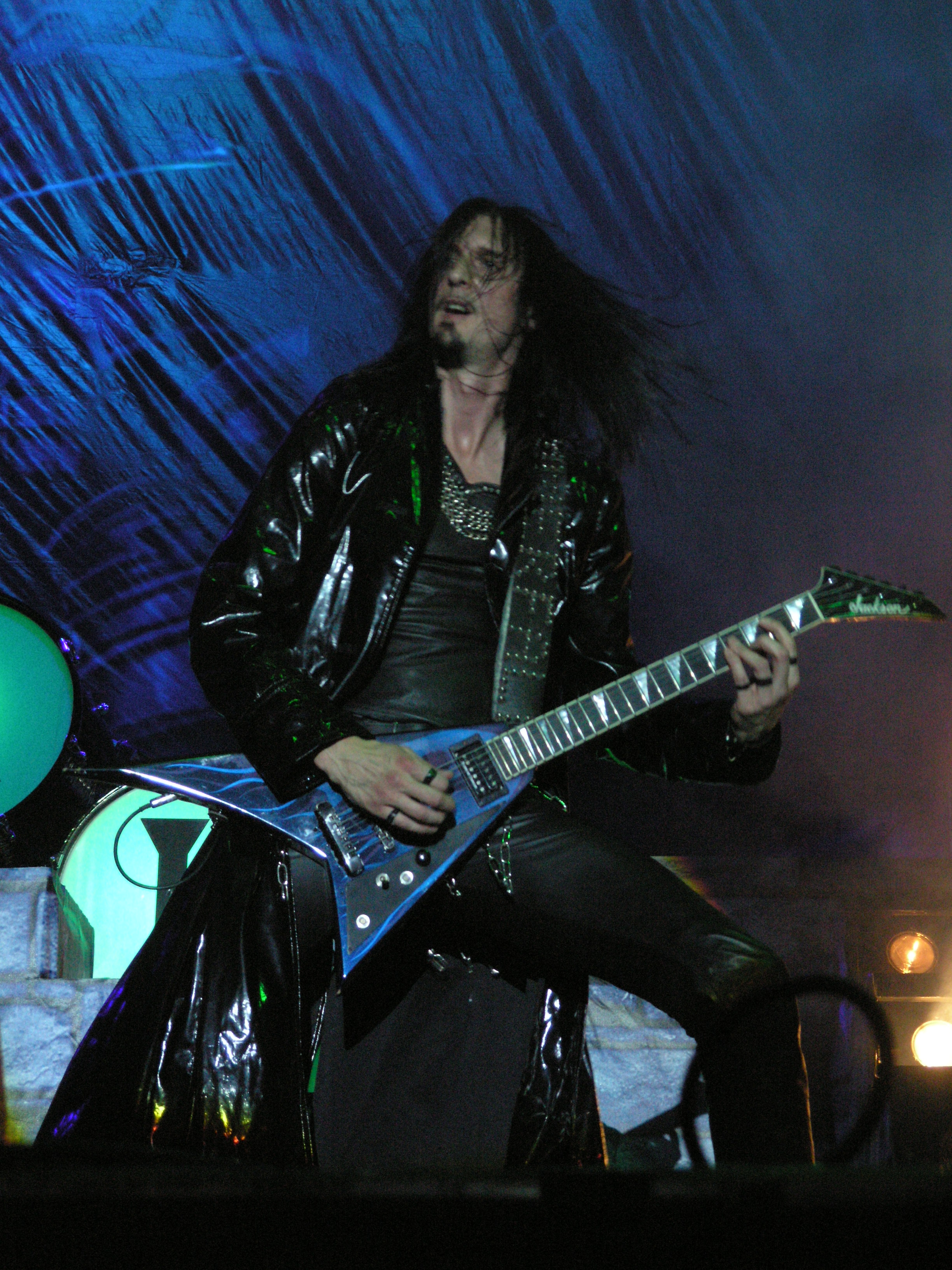
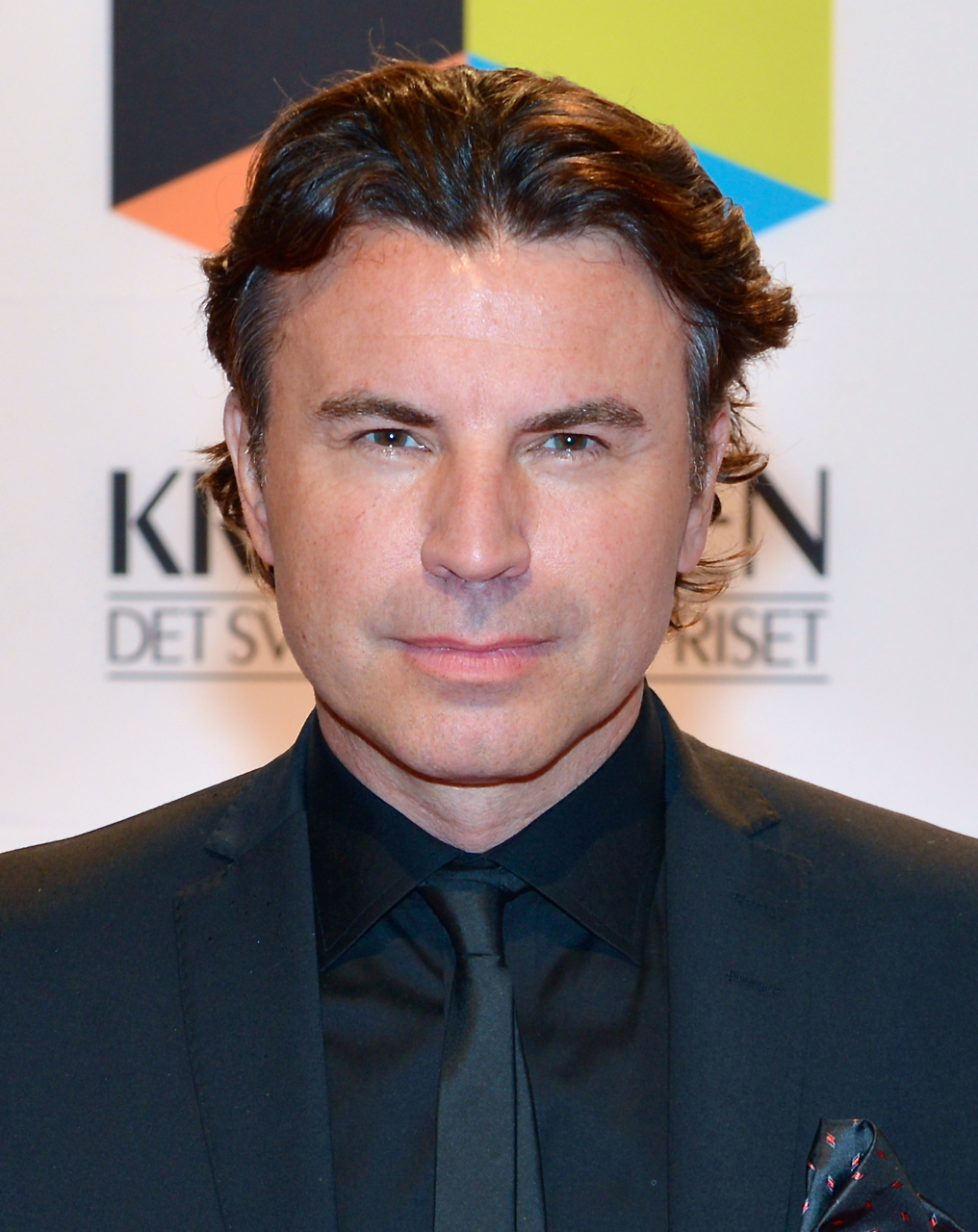
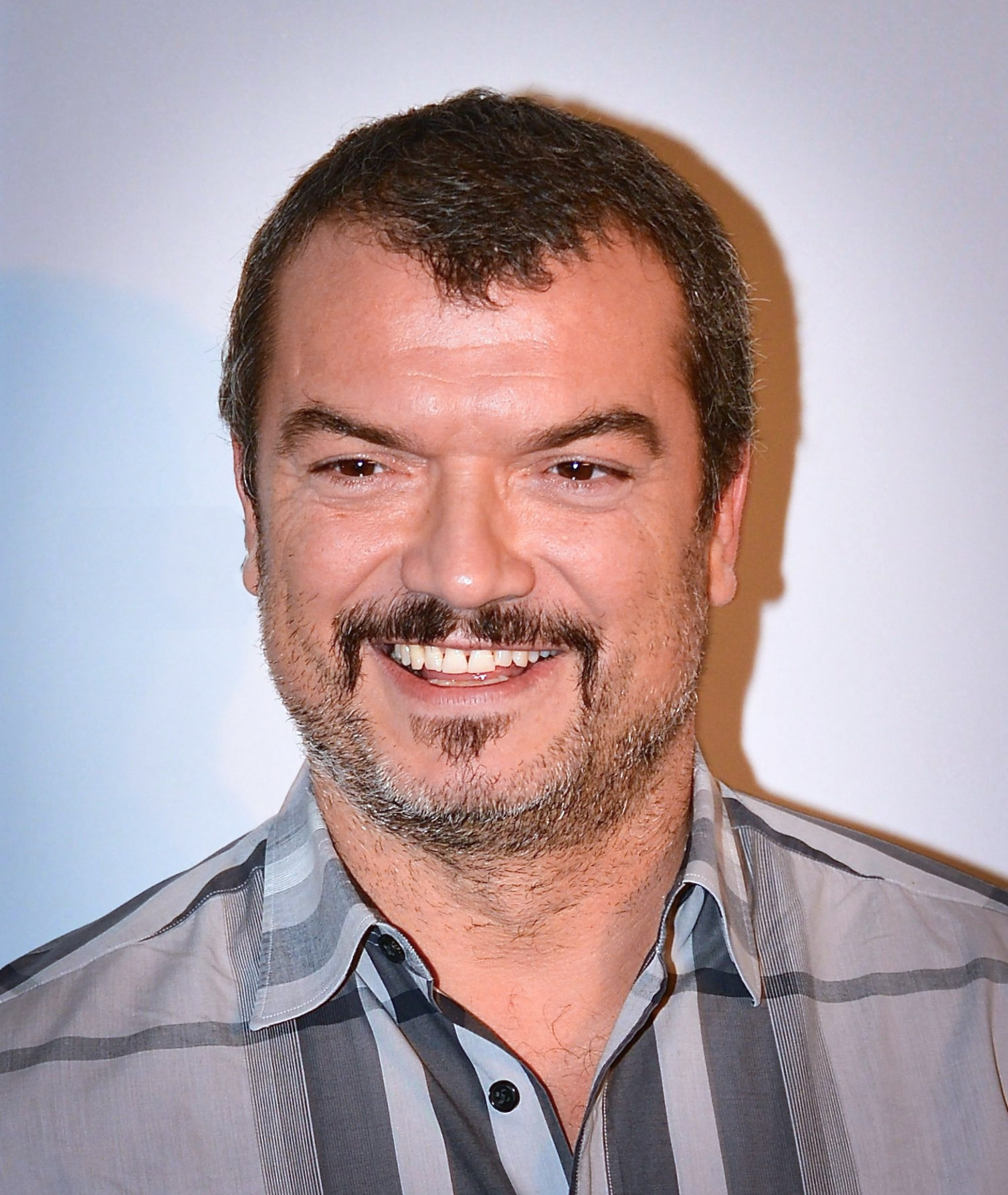
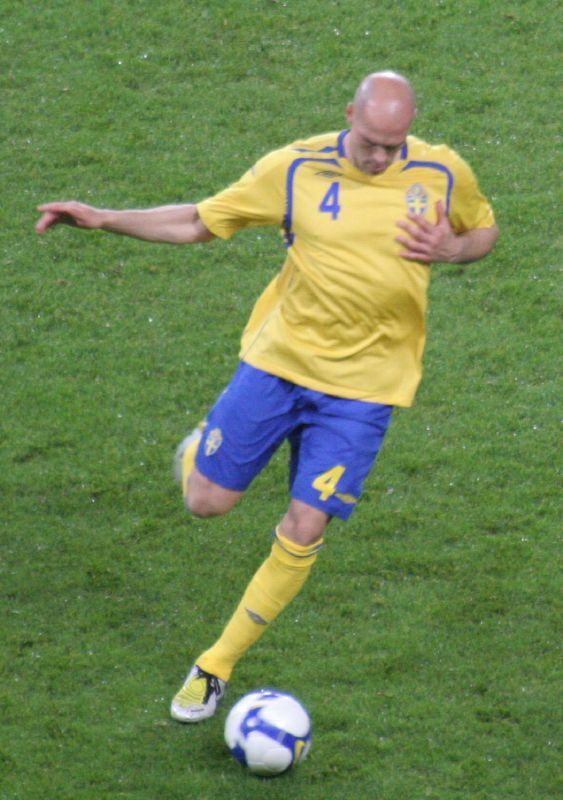
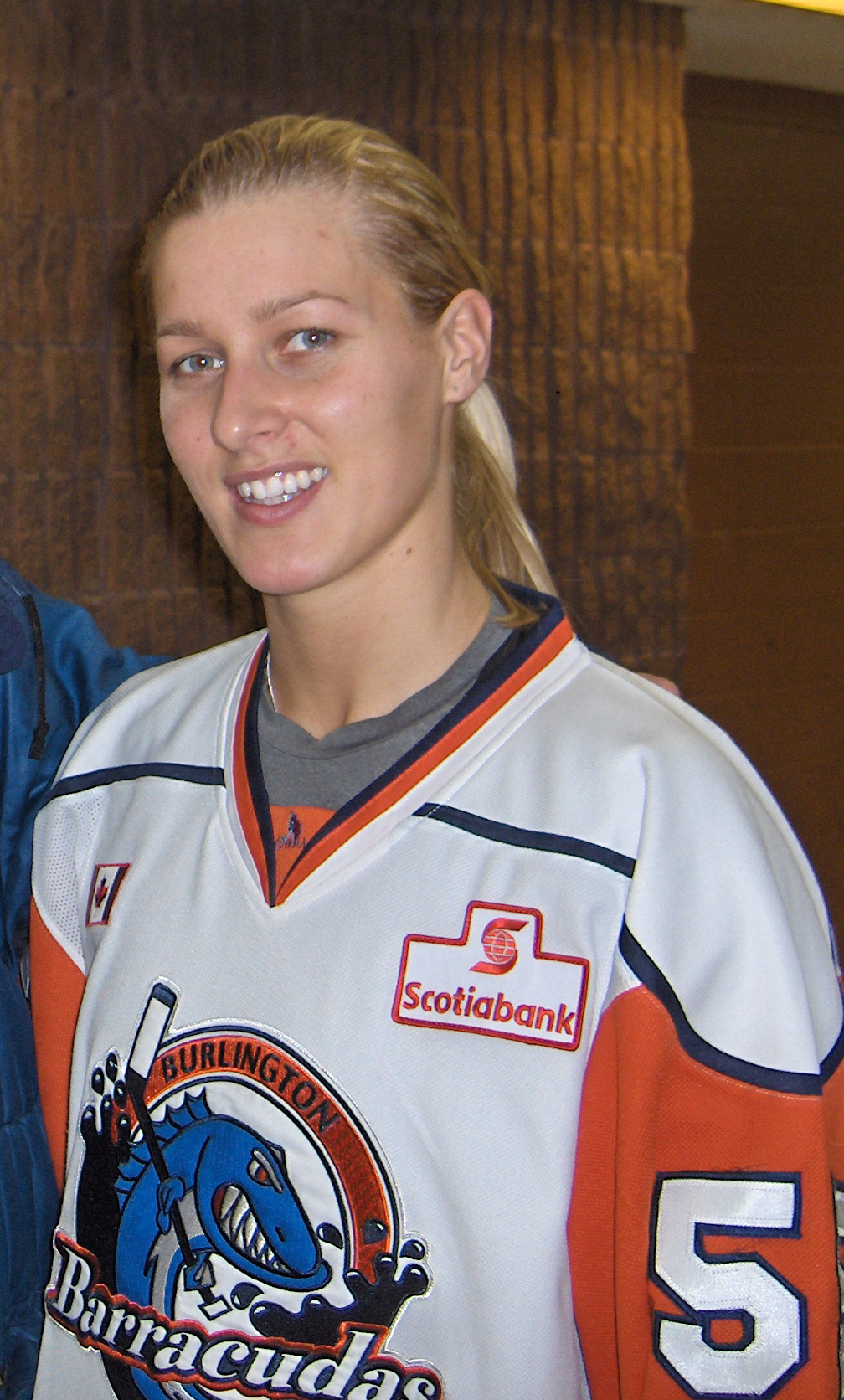
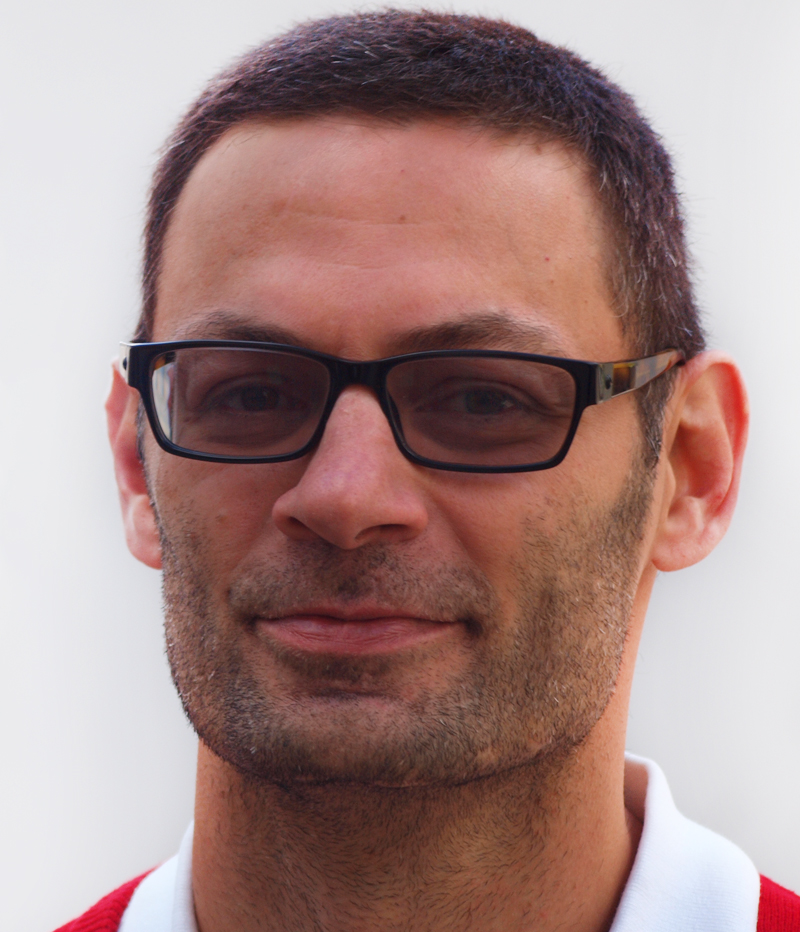
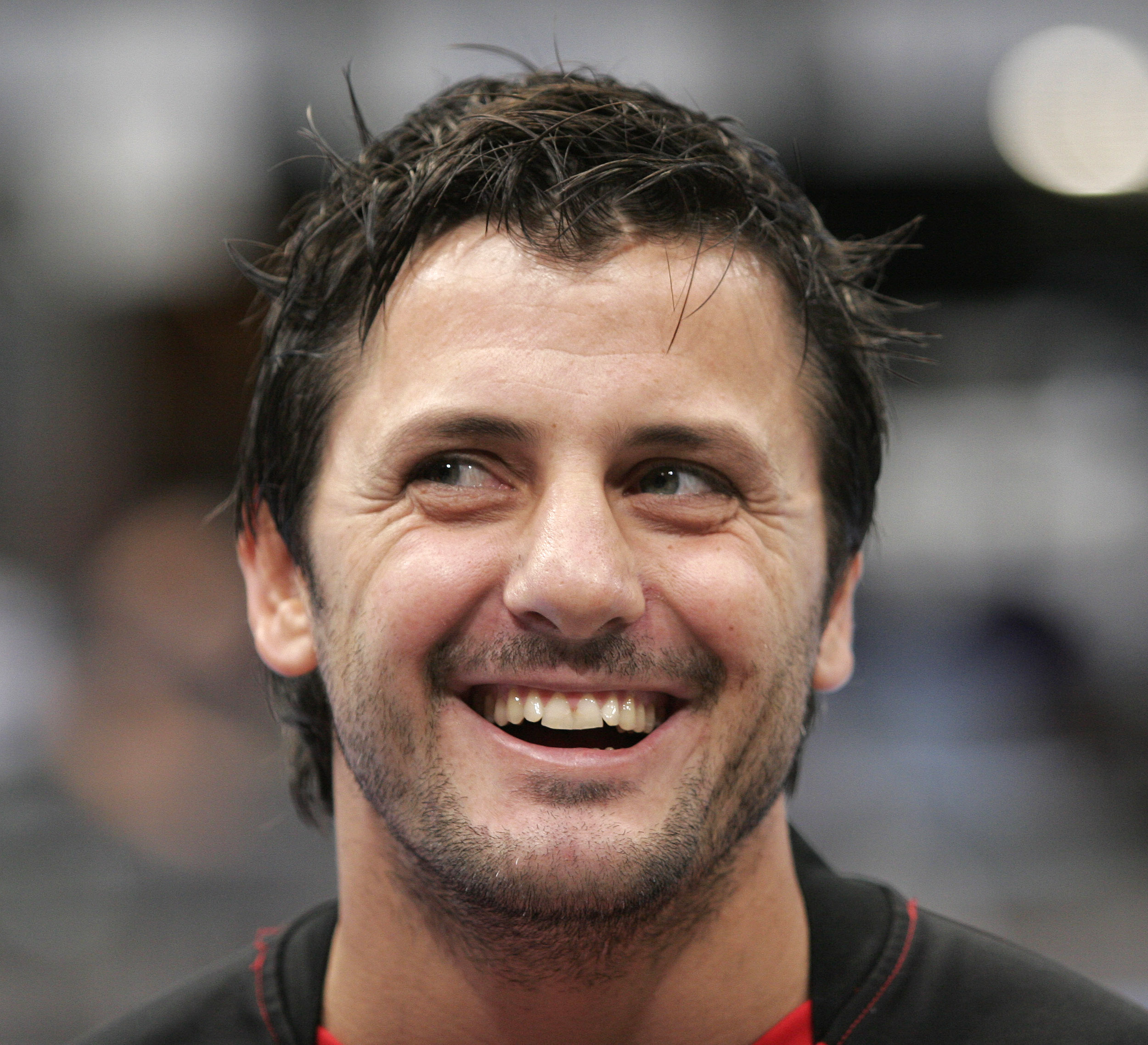
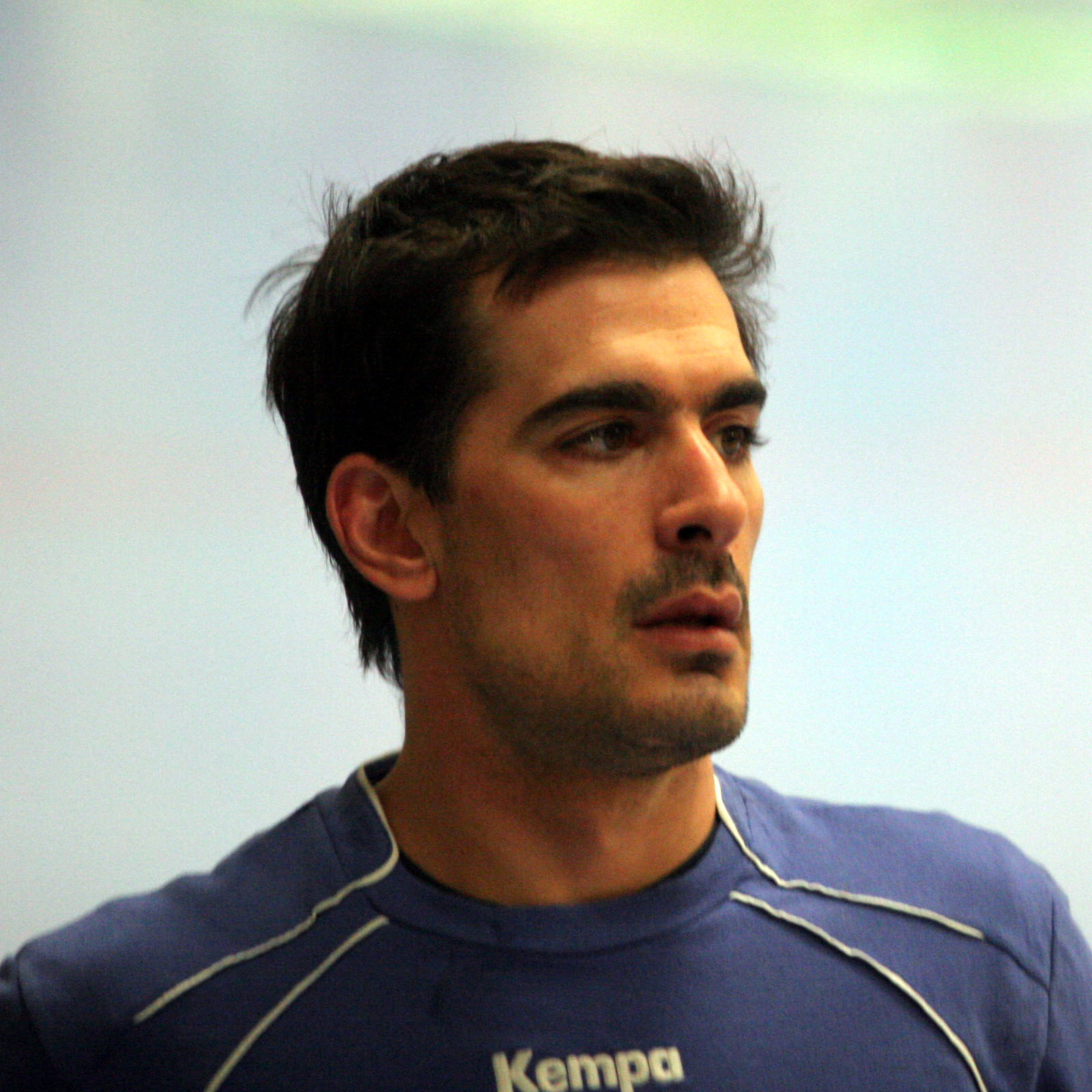
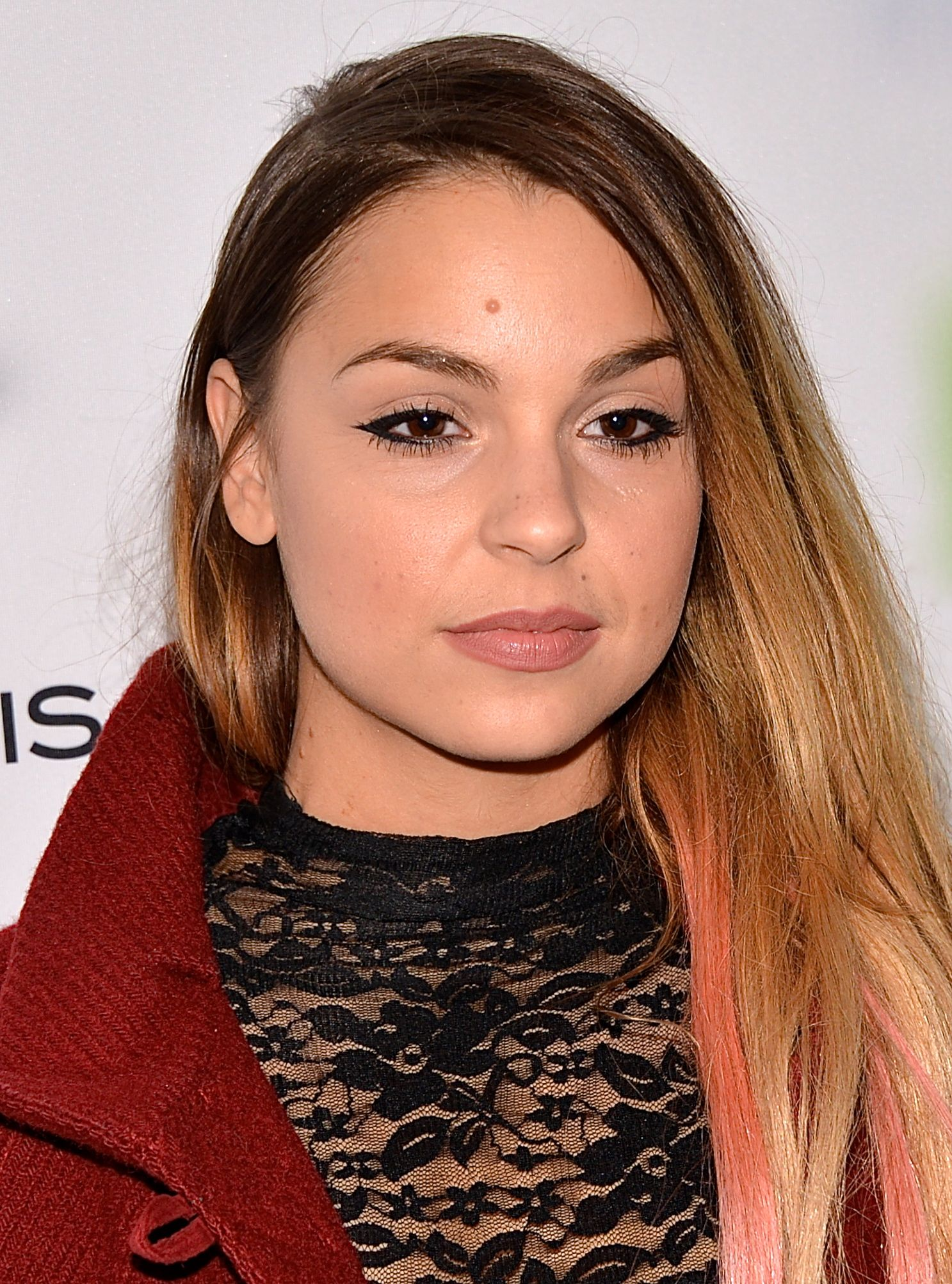
Nikola Šarčević	Oscar Dronjak	Jovan Radomir	Dragomir Mrsic	Daniel Majstorović
Danijela Rundqvist	Peter Popovic	Ljubomir Vranjes	Dalibor Doder	Alina Devecerski

- Alina Devecerski – singer, paternal Serb descent
- Bojan Djordjic – football player
- Dalibor Doder – handball player
- Oscar Dronjak – musician
- Alexander Kačaniklić – football player, paternal Serb descent
- Alexander Milošević – football player, paternal Serb descent
- Dusan Djuric – football player
- Katerina Kazelis – singer, maternal Serb descent
- Robert Kronberg – athlete, maternal Serb descent
- Zoran Lukić – football manager
- Daniel Majstorović – football player
- Dragomir Mrsic – actor
- Nikola Pasic – ice hockey player
- Peter Popovic – ice hockey player
- Rade Prica – football player
- Jovan Radomir – media personality
- Danijela Rundqvist – ice hockey player, maternal Serb descent
- Nikola Šarčević – musician
- Michaela Savić – beauty pageant titleholder and model
- Stefan Selaković – football player
- Sven Stojanović – television director
- Dragan Umicevic – ice hockey player
- Ljubomir Vranjes – handball player

== See also ==
- Immigration to Sweden
- Serb diaspora
- Serbia–Sweden relations
- Serbian Orthodox Eparchy of Scandinavia
