= Serbs in Norway =

Serbere i Norge Срби у Норвешкој Srbi u Norveškoj

Total population
- 8,964 (2025)

Regions with significant populations
- Oslo, Vestland

Languages
- Norwegian and Serbian

Religion
- Eastern Orthodoxy (Serbian Orthodox Church)

Related ethnic groups
- Serbs in Sweden, Serbs in Denmark

Serbs in Norway are Norwegian citizens of ethnic Serb descent and/or Serbia-born persons living in Norway. According to data from 2025, there were 8,964 Serbia-born people living in Norway.

== History ==
The significant number of Serb soldiers of the Royal Yugoslav Army was interned in Norway during World War II; of the total of 4,268 Yugoslav internees, 3,841 were Serbs. They were placed in about thirty Norwegian camps, most of which were located in northern Norway and some third of them found their death there and never returned to their homeland. In the Norwegian cemetery of Sur were buried 27 Serbs who were killed in 1942. A film titled "Karašjok Death Camp" was made about the suffering of Serbs in Norway during World War II.

Serbs have migrated to Norway as guest and migrant workers during Socialist Yugoslavia but it was halted in 1972 when Norway was faced with first serious levels of unemployment. Since then, work permits and residence permits have been issued to foreigners less frequently, mostly when it comes to political asylum.

Serbs have migrated to Norway as refugees of the Yugoslav Wars in the 1990s.

== Notable people ==
- Viktor Durasovic – tennis player
- Christina Vukicevic – athlete
- Vladimir Vukicevic – athlete

== See also ==
- Immigration to Norway
- Serb diaspora
- Norway–Serbia relations
- Serbian Orthodox Eparchy of Scandinavia
