= Serbs in Denmark =

Serbere i Danmark Срби у Данској Srbi u Danskoj

Total population
- 3,949 (2024)

Regions with significant populations
- Copenhagen, Aarhus

Languages
- Danish and Serbian

Religion
- Eastern Orthodoxy (Serbian Orthodox Church)

Related ethnic groups
- Serbs in Sweden, Serbs in Norway

Serbs in Denmark are Danish citizens of ethnic Serb descent and/or Serbia-born persons living in Denmark. According to data from 2024, there were 3,949 Serbian citizens in Denmark. This figure includes 2,613 immigrants and 1,336 descendants. Note that naturalized Danish citizens of Serb origin are not included if they or a parent were born in Denmark and acquired citizenship, so the figure undercounts fully integrated individuals of Serb origin.

== Notable people ==
- Danica Curcic – actress
- Birgithe Kosovic – journalist
- Slavko Labović – actor

== See also ==
- Immigration to Denmark
- Serb diaspora
- Denmark–Serbia relations
- Serbian Orthodox Eparchy of Scandinavia
