= Norway–Serbia relations =

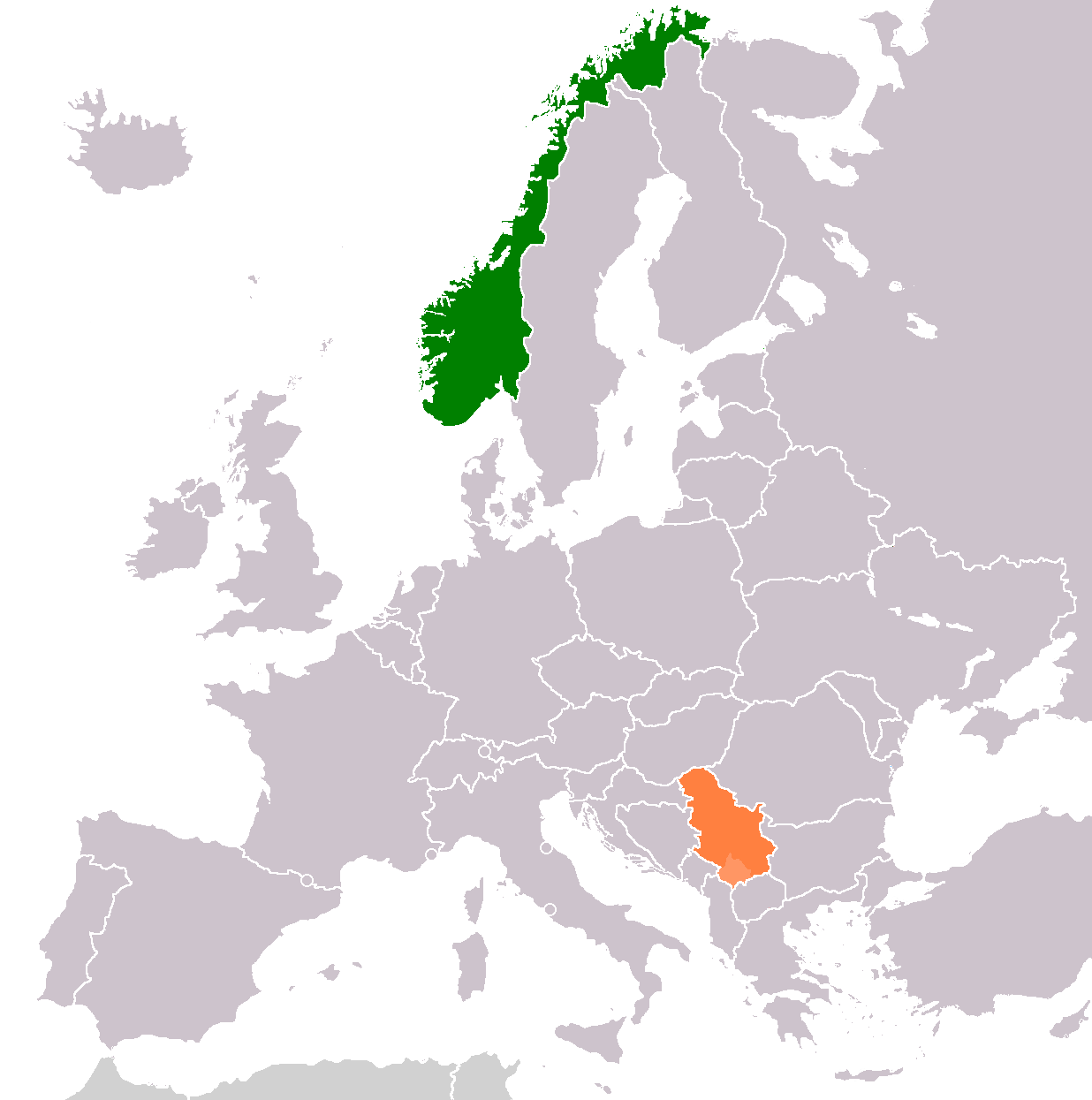
- Norway: Serbia

Norway and Serbia maintain diplomatic relations established in 1882. From 1918 to 2006, Norway maintained relations with the Kingdom of Yugoslavia, the Socialist Federal Republic of Yugoslavia (SFRY), and the Federal Republic of Yugoslavia (FRY) (later Serbia and Montenegro), of which Serbia is considered shared (SFRY) or sole (FRY) legal successor.

== History ==
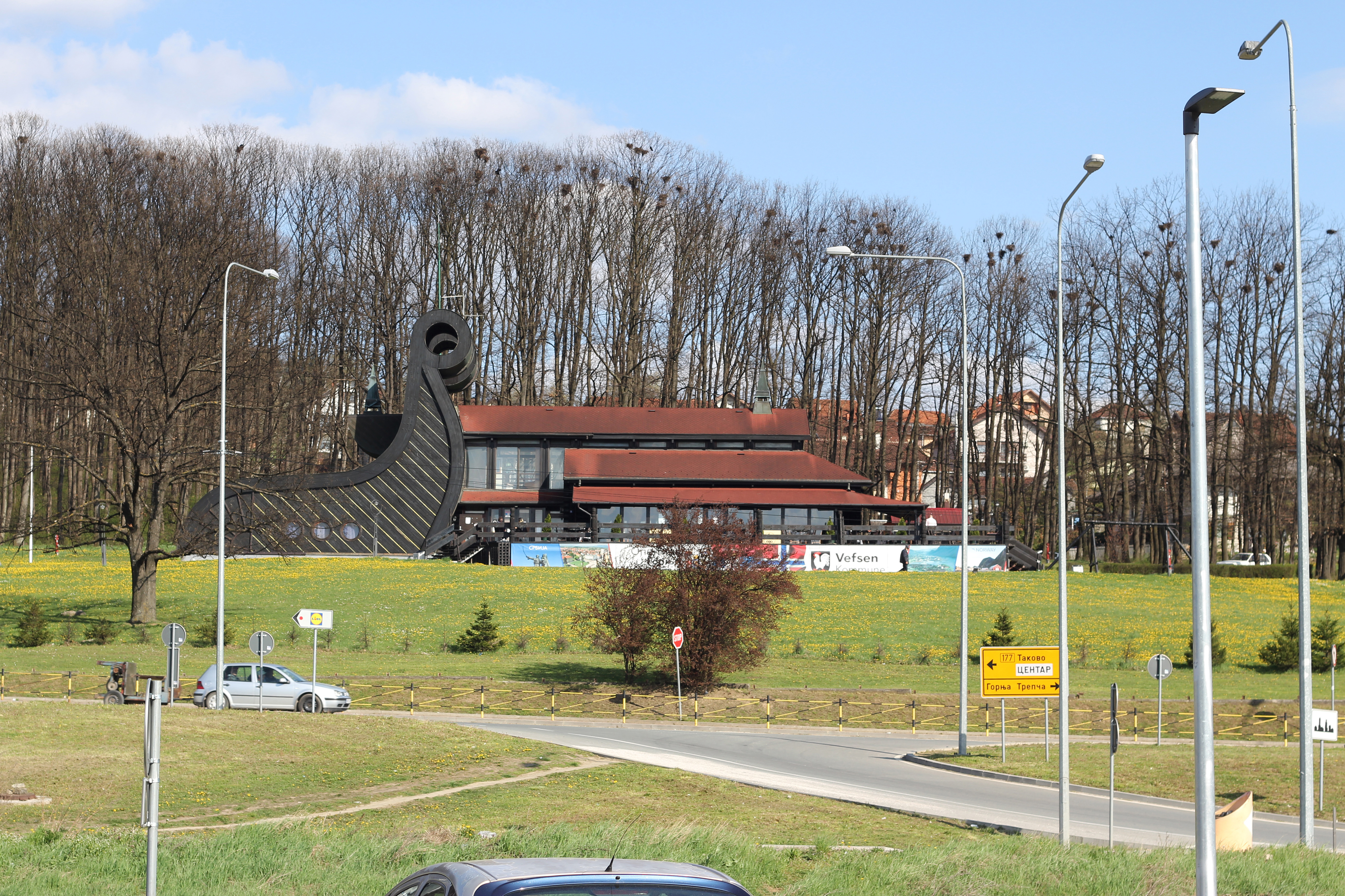
House of the Norwegian-Serbian Friendship in Gornji Milanovac

Former Norwegian Minister of Foreign Affairs Thorvald Stoltenberg served as Special Representative of the UN Secretary-General for Yugoslavia from 1993 to 1995, remaining one of the main liaisons between the two countries.

Norway supported the 1999 NATO bombing of the Federal Republic of Yugoslavia and later participated in the Kosovo Force.

The two countries signed a military cooperation agreement in 2015.

== Economic relations ==
Trade between the two countries amounted to $2.2 billion in 2023; Norway's merchandise exports to Serbia were roughly worth $439 million; Serbia's export to Norway were about $28 million.

== Immigration from Serbia ==
According to data from 2025, there were 8,964 people born in Serbia in the Norway.

== Resident diplomatic missions ==
- Norway has an embassy in Belgrade.
- Serbia has an embassy in Oslo.
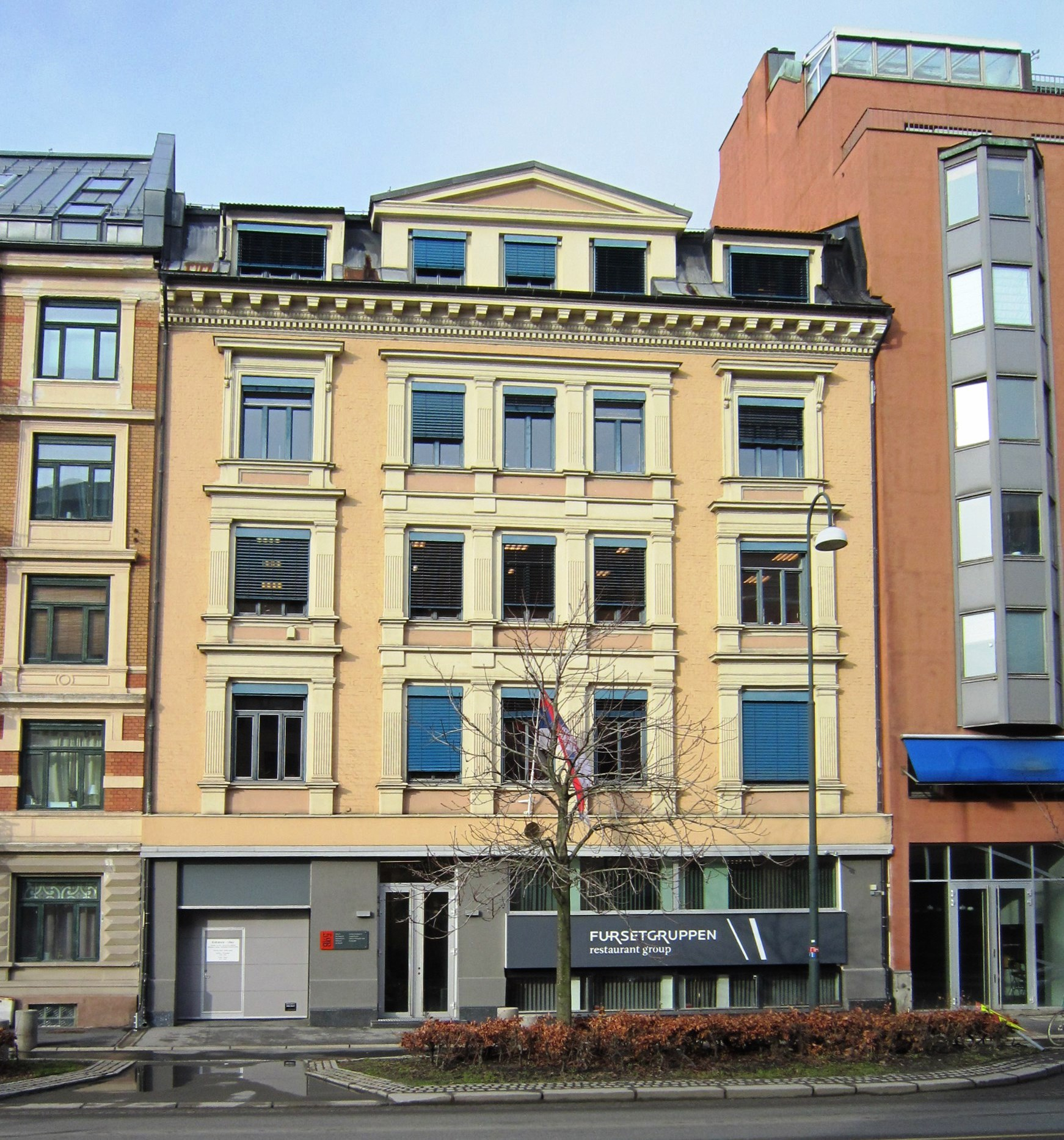
Embassy of Serbia in Oslo

== See also ==
- Foreign relations of Norway
- Foreign relations of Serbia
- Norway–Yugoslavia relations
