= Saint Stefan Dečanski Serbian Orthodox Church (Gothenburg) =

Serbian Orthodox church in Gothenburg, Sweden

Coordinates: 57.7483°N 12.0283°E

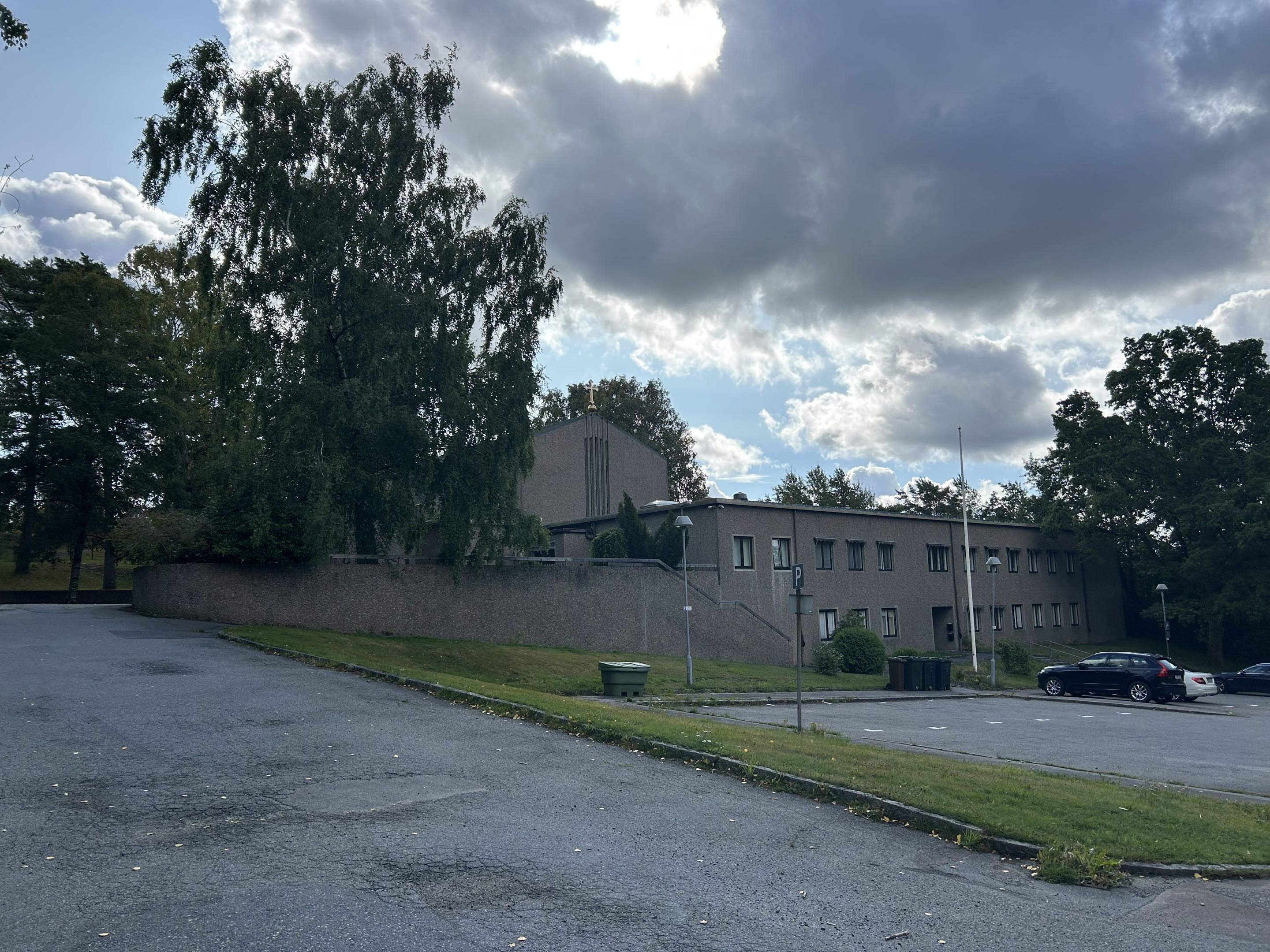
- Saint Stefan Dečanski Serbian Orthodox Church, pictured in 2026
- Saint Stefan Dečanski Serbian Orthodox Church
- Location: Gothenburg, Sweden
- Denomination: Serbian Orthodox Church

History
- Consecrated: 1972 (Church of Sweden); 2008 (Serbian Orthodox Church)

Administration
- Diocese: Serbian Orthodox Eparchy of Scandinavia

Saint Stefan Dečanski Serbian Orthodox Church (Serbian: Српска православна црква Светог Стефана Дечанског, romanized: Srpska pravoslavna crkva Svetog Stefana Dečanskog) is an Eastern Orthodox church located in Gothenburg, Sweden.

It is under jurisdiction of the Serbian Orthodox Eparchy of Scandinavia of the Serbian Orthodox Church and is dedicated to Saint Stefan Dečanski.

Named the Church of Our Lady (Swedish: Vårfrukyrkan) it belonged to the Kortdeala parish of the Church of Sweden and was inaugurated on 19 March 1972. In 2007, the Church of Sweden stopped using it and in 2008 it was sold to the Serbian Orthodox Church.

== Gallery ==
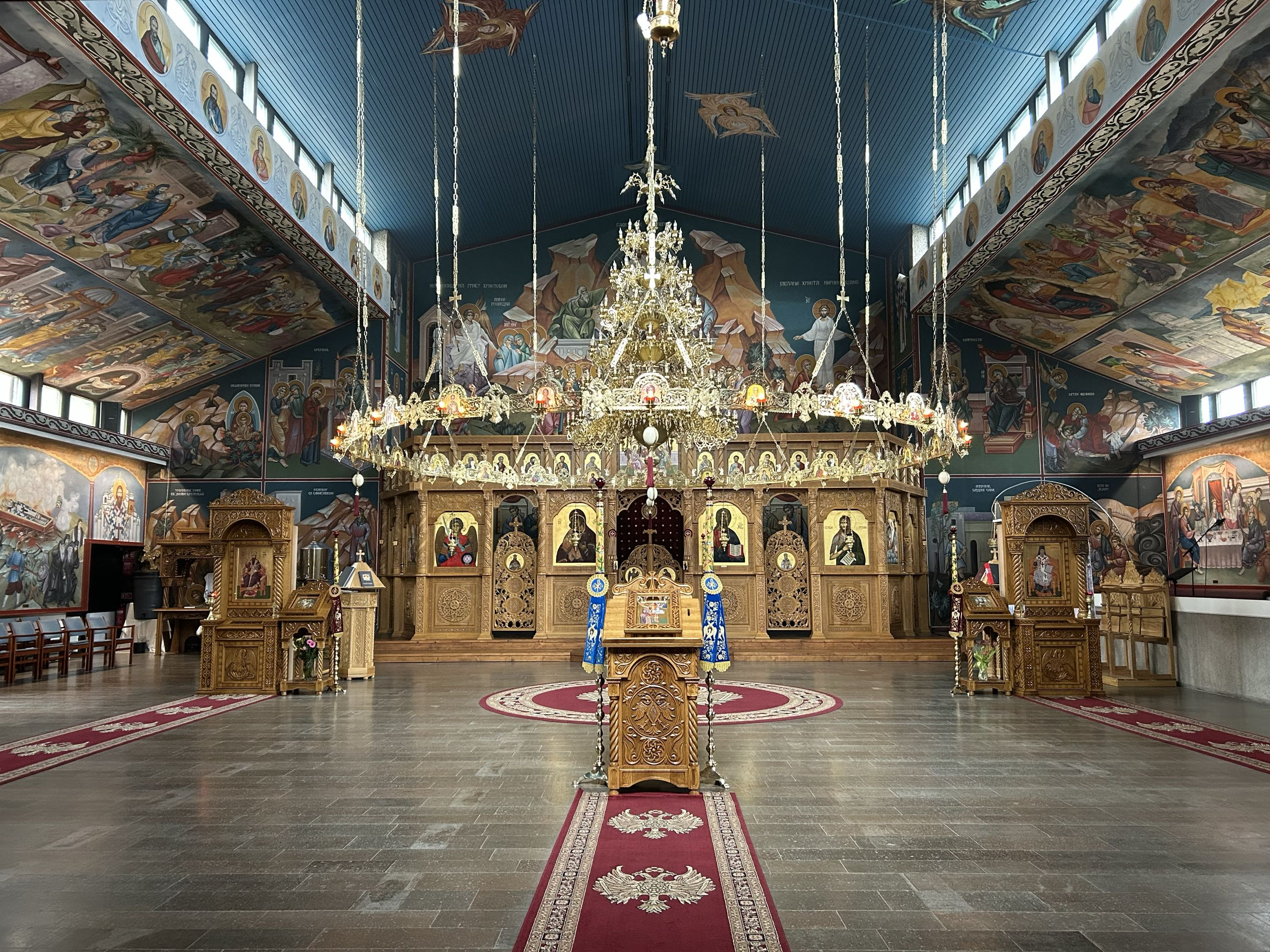
Interior
