= Saint Sava Serbian Orthodox Cathedral (Stockholm) =

Serbian Orthodox cathedral in Stockholm, Sweden

Coordinates: 59.2894°N 18.0617°E

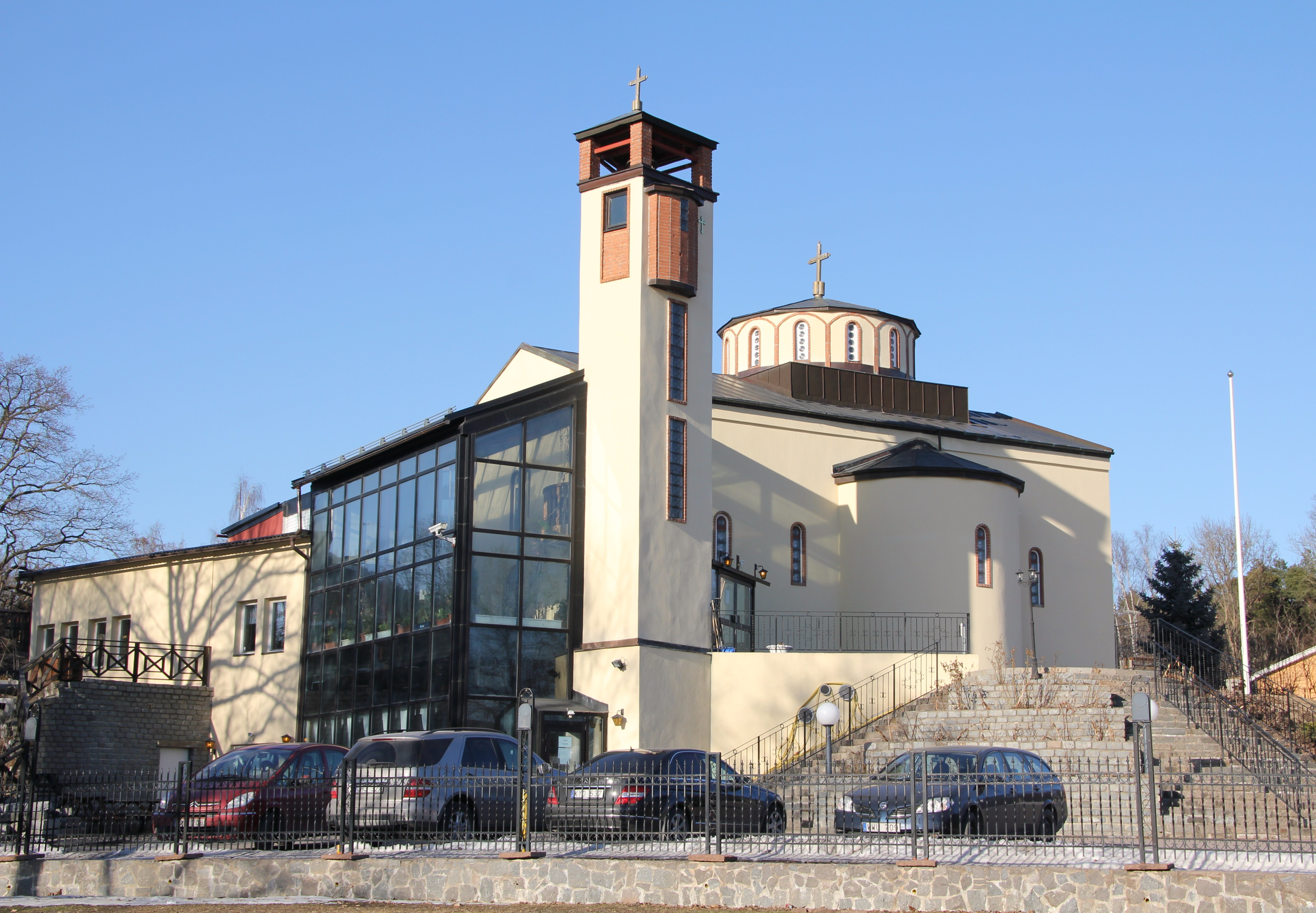
- Saint Sava Serbian Orthodox Cathedral, pictured in 2013
- Saint Sava Serbian Orthodox Cathedral
- Location: Enskede gård, Stockholm
- Country: Sweden
- Denomination: Serbian Orthodox Church

History
- Consecrated: 1991

Administration
- Diocese: Serbian Orthodox Eparchy of Scandinavia

The Saint Sava Serbian Orthodox Cathedral (Serbian: Саборна црква светог Саве, romanized: Saborna crkva svetog Save; Swedish: Sankt Sava serbisk-ortodoxa katedral) is an Eastern Orthodox church located in Enskede gård, Stockholm, Sweden. It is under jurisdiction of the Serbian Orthodox Eparchy of Scandinavia of the Serbian Orthodox Church and serves as its cathedral church. It is dedicated to Saint Sava, the first Archbishop of the Serbian Orthodox Church.

It was taken into use in 1991 but not officially inaugurated until 2014.

== See also ==
- Serbian Orthodox Eparchy of Scandinavia
- Serbs in Sweden
