= Enskede gård =

Commune in Söderort, Stockholm, Sweden

Coordinates: 59°17′19.24″N 18°3′59.72″E

- Commune
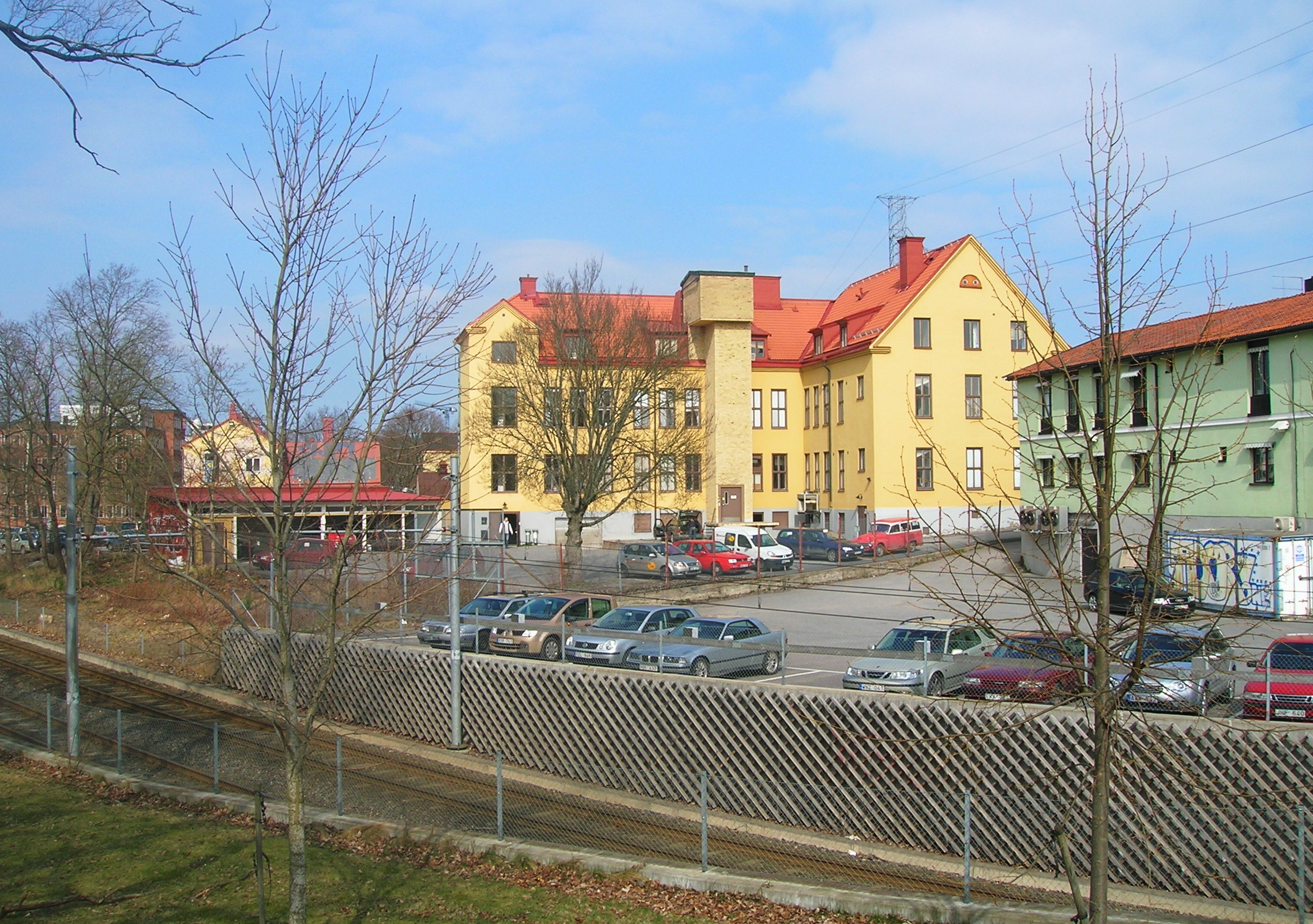
- Skyline of Enskede gård
- Interactive map of Enskede gård

Area
  - Total: 0.86 km^{2} (0.33 sq mi)

Population
  - Total: 4,246
- Website: http://www.stockholm.se/

Enskede gård is a commune in Söderort, Stockholm, Sweden. It is the site of the Enskede gård metro station.

The headquarters of the Serbian Orthodox Eparchy of Britain and Scandinavia are located in Enskede gård.

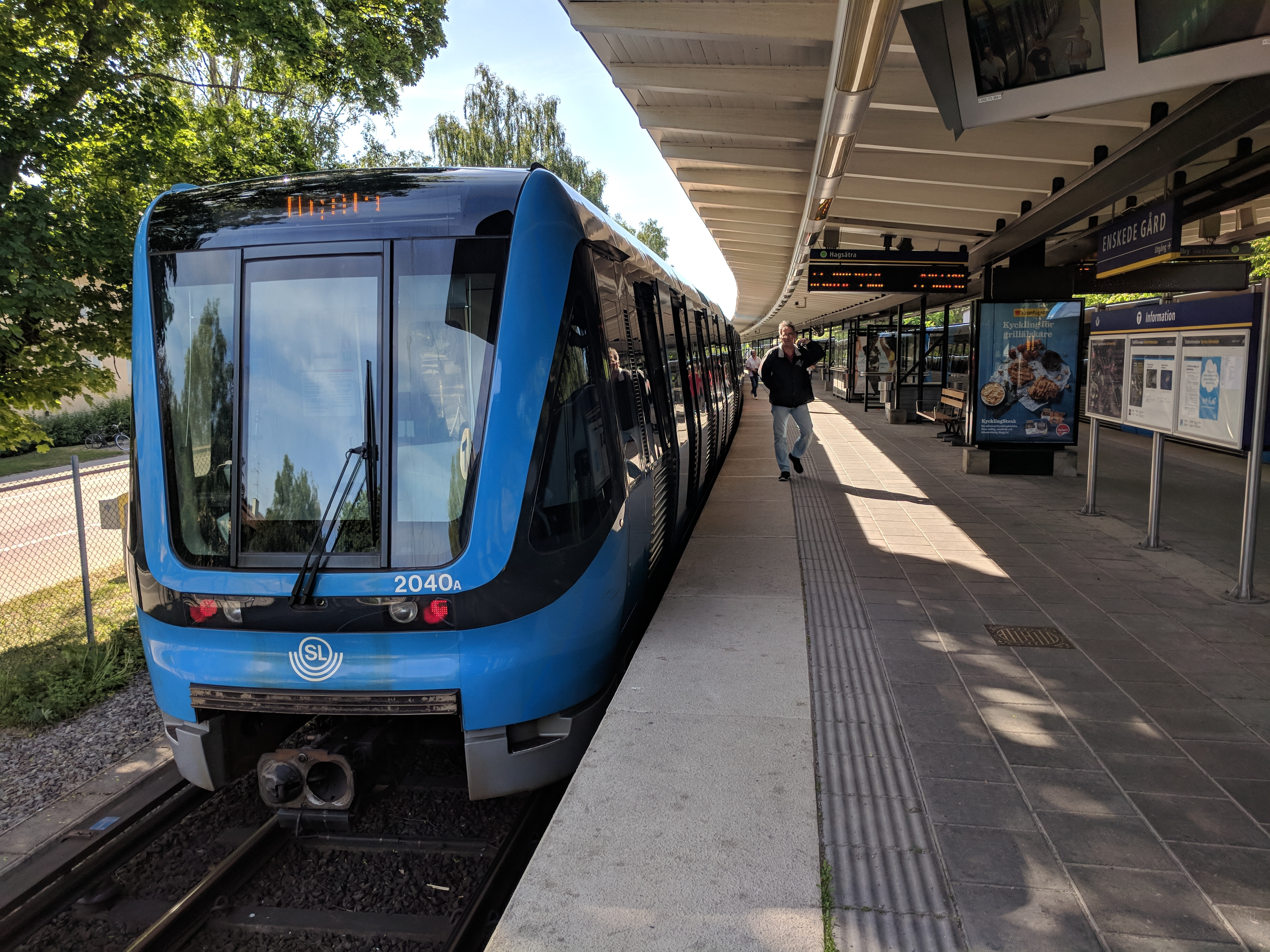
Railway station in Enskede Gård
