= List of members of the National Assembly of Serbia, 2016–2020 =

This is a list of the 250 members of the 11th convocation of the National Assembly of Serbia, as well as a list of former members of this convocation.

The 11th convocation of the National Assembly was elected in the 2016 parliamentary election, and it first met on 3 June 2016.

Name	Abbr.	Leader	Ideology	Political position	MPs	Gov′t
Serbian Progressive Party; Српска напредна странка Srpska napredna stranka	SNS	Aleksandar Vučić	Populism; Neoliberalism	Centre-right to right-wing	93 / 250	Government
Serbian Radical Party; Српска радикална странка Srpska radikalna stranka	SRS	Vojislav Šešelj	Ultranationalism; Euroscepticism	Far-right	22 / 250	Opposition
Socialist Party of Serbia; Социјалистичка партија Србије; Socjalistička partija Srbje	SPS	Ivica Dačić	Left-wing nationalism Left-wing populism	Centre-left	21 / 250	Government
Enough is Enough – Restart; Доста је било – Рестарт; Dosta je bilo – Restart	DJB	Saša Radulović	Liberalism; Progressivism	Centre to centre-right	16 / 250	Opposition
Democratic Party; Демократска странка Demokratska stranka	DS	Dragan Šutanovac	Social democracy Social liberalism	Centre to centre-left	12 / 250	Opposition
Social Democratic Party of Serbia; Социјалдемократска партија Србије; Socijaldemokratska partija Srbije	SDPS	Rasim Ljajić	Social democracy Pro-Europeanism	Centre-left	10 / 250	Government
Party of United Pensioners of Serbia; Партија уједињених пензионера Србије; Partija ujedinjenih penzionera Srbije	PUPS	Jovan Krkobabić	Pensioners' interests Pro-Europeanism	Single-issue	9 / 250	Government
Serbian Movement Dveri; Српски покрет Двер; Srpski pokret Dveri	Dveri	Boško Obradović	Serbian nationalism Euroscepticism	Right-wing	7 / 250	Opposition
Democratic Party of Serbia; Демократска странка Србије; Demokratska stranka Srbije	DSS	Sanda Rašković Ivić	National conservatism Christian democracy	Right-wing	6 / 250	Opposition
United Serbia; Јединствена Србија; Jedinstvena Srbija	JS	Dragan Marković	Serbian nationalism National conservatism	Right-wing	6 / 250	Government support
New Serbia; Нова Србија; Nova Srbija	NS	Velimir Ilić	Right-wing populism Monarchism	Right-wing	5 / 250	Government support
Social Democratic Party; Социјалдемократска странка Socijaldemokratska stranka	SDS	Boris Tadić	Social democracy Atlanticism	Centre-left	5 / 250	Opposition
League of Social Democrats of Vojvodina; Лига социјалдемократа Војводине; Liga socijaldemokrata Vojvodine	LSV	Nenad Čanak	Social democracy Regionalism	Centre-left	4 / 250	Opposition
Liberal Democratic Party; Либерално демократска партија Liberalno demokratska partija	LDP	Čedomir Jovanović	Liberalism; Atlanticism	Centre	4 / 250	Opposition
Alliance of Vojvodina Hungarians; Савез војвођанских Мађара; Savez vojvođanskih Mađara	SVM	István Pásztor	Hungarian minority politics Conservatism	Centre-right	4 / 250	Government support
Serbian Renewal Movement; Српски покрет обнове Srpski pokret obnove	SPO	Vuk Drašković	Monarchism; Atlanticism	Centre-right	3 / 250	Government support
Movement of Socialists; Покрет социјалиста Pokret socijalista	PS	Aleksandar Vulin	Left-wing nationalism Euroscepticism	Left-wing	3 / 250	Government
Serbian People's Party; Српска народна партија Srpska narodna partija	SNP	Nenad Popović	National conservatism Euroscepticism	Right-wing	3 / 250	Government
Greens of Serbia; Зелени Србије; Zeleni Srbije	ZS	Ivan Karić	Green politics Pro-Europeanism	Centre-left	2 / 250	Government support
Strength of Serbia Movement; Покрет снага Србије; Pokret snaga Srbije	PSS	Bogoljub Karić	Conservatism; Pro-Europeanism	Centre-right	2 / 250	Government support
Bosniak Democratic Union of Sandžak; Бошњачка демократска заједница Санџака; Bošnjačka demokratska zajednica Sandžaka	BDZS	Jahja Fehratović	Bosniak minority politics Conservatism	Right-wing	2 / 250	Opposition
Party of Democratic Action of Sandžak; Странка демократске акције Санџака; Stranka demokratske akcije Sandžaka	SDA S	Sulejman Ugljanin	Bosniak minority politics Autonomism	Centre-right to right-wing	2 / 250	Opposition
Together for Serbia; Заједно за Србију; Zajedno za Srbiju	ZZS	Dušan Petrović	Social democracy Progressivism	Centre-left	1 / 250	Opposition
New Party; Нова странка Nova stranka	NOVA	Zoran Živković	Liberalism; Pro-Europeanism	Centre	1 / 250	Opposition
Party for Democratic Action; Партија за демократско деловање Partija za demokratsko delovanje	PDD	Riza Halimi	Albanian minority politics Regionalism	Right-wing	1 / 250	Opposition
Green Party; Зелена Странка; Zelena Stranka	ZES	Goran Čabradi	Slovak minority politics Green politics	Minority politics	1 / 250	Opposition
People's Peasant Party; Народна сељачка Странка; Narodna seljačka Stranka	NSS	Marijan Rističević	National conservatism Agrarianism	Right-wing	1 / 250	Government support
United Peasant Party; Уједињена сељачка странка Ujedinjena seljačka stranka	USS	Milija Miletić	Agrarianism; Populism	Centre-left	1 / 250	Government support

== Total membership by political party or movement at the dissolution of the assembly ==
Name	MPs	Gov′t
Serbian Progressive Party	92 + 5 aligned independents	G
Serbian Radical Party	22	O
Socialist Party of Serbia	20	G
Democratic Party	12	O
Social Democratic Party of Serbia	10	G
Party of United Pensioners of Serbia	9	G
Party of Modern Serbia (not a recognized party in the assembly)	6	O
United Serbia	6	S
Alliance of Vojvodina Hungarians	4	S
Dveri	4	O
Liberal Democratic Party	4	O
Dosta je bilo (not a recognized party in the assembly)	3	O
League of Social Democrats of Vojvodina	3	O
Movement of Socialists	3	G
People's Party	3	O
Serbian People's Party	3	G
Civic Platform (not a recognized party in the assembly)	2	O
Democratic Party of Serbia	2	O
Justice and Reconciliation Party	2	S
Party of Freedom and Justice (not a recognized party in the assembly)	2	O
Serbia 21 (not a recognized party in the assembly)	2	O
Serbian Renewal Movement	2	S
Social Democratic Party	2	O
Strength of Serbia Movement	2	S
Better Serbia	1	O
Communist Party	1	S
Democratic Alliance of Croats in Vojvodina	1	O
Fatherland (not a recognized party in the assembly)	1	O
Greens of Serbia	1	S
Green Party	1	O
Movement for the Restoration of the Kingdom of Serbia	1	S
New Party	1	O
New Serbia	1	O
Party for Democratic Action	1	O
Party of Democratic Action of Sandžak	1	O
People's Peasant Party	1	S
Together for Serbia	1	O
Together for Šumadija	1	O
United Peasant Party	1	S
Independents not aligned with other parties	10	

== List of members of the 11th National Assembly at its dissolution ==
Name	Parliamentary group	Political Party or Movement	Residence	Year of birth	Notes
Andrijana Avramov	Progressive	Serbian Progressive Party	Belgrade	1979	Awarded mandate on 22 January 2019 as a replacement for Ratko Jankov.
Miroslav Aleksić	-	People's Party	Trstenik	1978	Member of the People's Movement of Serbia until October 2017.
Veroljub Arsić; Vice-President of the National Assembly	Progressive	Serbian Progressive Party	Požarevac	1969	
Marko Atlagić	Progressive	Serbian Progressive Party	Belgrade	1949	
Vlado Babić	VMSZ	Serbian Progressive Party	Sombor	1960	
Dušan Bajatović	Socialist	Socialist Party of Serbia	Novi Sad	1967	
Grozdana Banac	PUPS	Party of United Pensioners of Serbia	Belgrade	1951	Awarded mandate on 28 August 2017 as a replacement for Miroljub Stanković.
Dragana Barišić	Progressive	Serbian Progressive Party	Kruševac	1975	
Ivan Bauer	SDPS	Social Democratic Party of Serbia	Belgrade, Stari Grad	1967	Awarded mandate on 10 August 2016 as a replacement for Rasim Ljajić.
Muamer Bačevac	SDPS	Social Democratic Party of Serbia	Novi Pazar	1977	
Aleksandra Belačić	Radical	Serbian Radical Party	Belgrade, New Belgrade	1986	
Igor Bečić	Progressive	Serbian Progressive Party	Vrbas	1971	
Vojin Biljić	-	Dosta je bilo	Belgrade	1977	Awarded mandate on 22 January 2019 as a replacement for Jasmina Nikolić.
Boban Birmančević	Progressive	Serbian Progressive Party	Šabac	1969	Awarded mandate on 12 October 2017 as a replacement for Marko Gavrilović.
Milena Bićanin	SDPS	Social Democratic Party of Serbia	Belgrade, Dobanovci	1964	
Žarko Bogatinović	Progressive	Serbian Progressive Party	Leskovac	1964	
Goran Bogdanović	DS	Social Democratic Party	Leposavić	1963	
Snežana Bogosavljević Bošković	Socialist	Socialist Party of Serbia	Čačak	1964	
Nenad Božić	Party of Modern Serbia	Party of Modern Serbia	Kragujevac	1971	Member of Dosta je bilo until March 2018.
Sandra Božić	Progressive	Serbian Progressive Party	Pančevo, Omoljica	1979	Awarded mandate on 6 March 2018 as a replacement for Vesna Rakonjac.
Balša Božović	DS	Democratic Party	Belgrade	1983	
Zoran Bojanić	Progressive	Serbian Progressive Party	Kraljevo	1959	
Dubravko Bojić	Radical	Serbian Radical Party	Belgrade	1953	
Dušan Borković	Progressive	-	Pančevo	1984	
Josip Broz	Socialist	Communist Party	Belgrade	1947	
Danica Bukvić	Socialist	Socialist Party of Serbia	Belgrade, Lazarevac	1951	
Slaviša Bulatović	Progressive	Serbian Progressive Party	Vranje, Vranjska Banja	1975	
Dragan Veljković	Progressive	Serbian Progressive Party	Štrpce	1964	
Slobodan Veličković	PUPS	Party of United Pensioners of Serbia	Belgrade	1947	Awarded mandate on 3 March 2020 as a replacement for Vera Paunović.
Jelisaveta Veljković	PUPS	Party of United Pensioners of Serbia	Sremski Karlovci	1951	Awarded mandate on 21 April 2017 as a replacement for Konstantin Arsenović.
Dragan Vesović	-	Dveri	Kraljevo	1966	Awarded mandate on 10 August 2016 as a replacement for Biljana Rubaković.
Maja Videnović	DS	Democratic Party	Belgrade	1979	
Sonja Vlahović	Progressive	Serbian Progressive Party	Belgrade, New Belgrade	1969	
Milimir Vujadinović	Progressive	Serbian Progressive Party	Subotica	1979	
Vojislav Vujić	United Serbia	United Serbia	Vrnjačka Banja	1975	
Jelena Vujić Obradović	United Serbia	United Serbia	Aleksandrovac	1979	Awarded mandate on 5 October 2016 as a replacement for Srđan Kružević.
Đorđe Vukadinović	NS–Movement for Serbia's Salvation	-	Novi Sad	1962	
Dijana Vukomanović	NS–Movement for Serbia's Salvation	People's Party	Belgrade	1967	Member of the Socialist Party of Serbia until October 2016. Subsequently an independent until October 2017 (or shortly thereafter).
Nataša Vučković	DS	Democratic Party	Belgrade	1967	
Gorica Gajić	-	Democratic Party of Serbia	Svilajnac	1958	
Bajro Gegić	LDP–SDA	-	Tutin	1954	Awarded mandate on 10 August 2016 as a replacement for Sulejman Ugljanin. Member of the SDA until February 2020.
Žika Gojković	Progressive	Movement for the Restoration of the Kingdom of Serbia	Sombor	1972	Member of the Serbian Renewal Movement until May 2017. Subsequently an independent until July 2017.
Maja Gojković; President of the National Assembly	Progressive	Serbian Progressive Party	Novi Sad	1963	
Borka Grubor	Progressive	Serbian Progressive Party	Loznica	1960	
Mladen Grujić	-	-	Belgrade	1966	Member of New Serbia until January 2017.
Tijana Davidovac	Progressive	Serbian Progressive Party	Belgrade, Lazarevac	1986	
Miljan Damjanović	Radical	Serbian Radical Party	Belgrade	1984	
Božidar Delić	Radical	Serbian Radical Party	Belgrade	1956	
Zoran Despotović	Radical	Serbian Radical Party	Prijepolje	1965	Awarded mandate on 17 April 2018 as a replacement for Zoran Krasić.
Ivana Dinić	Socialist	Socialist Party of Serbia	Niš, Medijana	1985	Awarded mandate on 28 December 2016 as a replacement for Ivica Tončev.
Mirjana Dragaš	Socialist	Socialist Party of Serbia	Belgrade, Zemun	1950	Awarded mandate on 12 October 2017 as a replacement for Ivan Karić.
Zoran Dragišić	Progressive	-	Belgrade	1967	
Milovan Drecun	Progressive	Serbian Progressive Party	Belgrade	1957	
Zvonimir Đokić	Progressive	Serbian Progressive Party	Belgrade	1960	
Vladimir Đukanović	Progressive	Serbian Progressive Party	Belgrade	1979	
Vladimir Đurić	Party of Modern Serbia	Party of Modern Serbia	Novi Sad	1970	Member of Dosta je bilo until March 2018.
Živan Đurišić	Progressive	Serbian Progressive Party	Velika Plana	1947	Awarded mandate on 7 June 2018 as a replacement for Željko Sušec.
Marko Đurišić	Vojvodina Front–Serbia 21	Serbia 21	Belgrade, Vračar	1968	
Jelena Žarić Kovačević	Progressive	Serbian Progressive Party	Niš	1981	
Zoran Živković	-	New Party	Belgrade, Vračar	1960	
Slavica Živković	SDPS	Social Democratic Party of Serbia	Belgrade, Zemun	1970	Awarded mandate on 19 July 2018 as a replacement for Meho Omerović.
Tomislav Žigmanov	Vojvodina Front–Serbia 21	Democratic Alliance of Croats in Vojvodina	Subotica	1967	
Vladan Zagrađanin	Socialist	Socialist Party of Serbia	Belgrade, New Belgrade	1968	
Marko Zeljug	Progressive	Serbian Progressive Party	Belgrade, Surčin	1983	
Muamer Zukorlić	-	Justice and Reconciliation Party	Novi Pazar	1970	
Vesna Ivković	Socialist	Socialist Party of Serbia	Smederevo	1960	Awarded mandate on 5 October 2016 as a replacement for Ivica Dačić.
Enis Imamović	LDP–SDA	Party of Democratic Action of Sandžak	Novi Pazar	1984	
Stanislava Janošević	Progressive	Serbian Progressive Party	Zrenjanin	1986	Awarded mandate on 10 August 2016 as a replacement for Aleksandar Vučić.
Radovan Jančić	Progressive	Serbian Progressive Party	Novi Kneževac	1958	
Krsto Janjušević	Progressive	Serbian Progressive Party	Priboj	1981	
Marija Janjušević	-	Dveri	Inđija	1971	
Marija Jevđić	United Serbia	United Serbia	Kraljevo	1981	
Aleksandra Jevtić	Progressive	Serbian Progressive Party	Vrnjačka Banja	1976	Awarded mandate on 26 September 2018 as a replacement for Ivan Manojlović.
Jovica Jevtić	Progressive	Serbian Progressive Party	Raška	1975	
Milanka Jevtović Vukojičić	Progressive	Serbian Progressive Party	Priboj	1960	
Predrag Jelenković	SDPS	Social Democratic Party of Serbia	Niš	1965	Awarded mandate on 5 October 2016 as a replacement for Gordana Predić.
Aleksandra Jerkov	DS	Democratic Party	Novi Sad	1982	
Goran Ješić	DS	Democratic Party	Inđija	1974	
Branimir Jovanović	SDPS	Social Democratic Party of Serbia	Kraljevo	1979	
Vera Jovanović	Progressive	Serbian Progressive Party	Belgrade, Rakovica	1947	Awarded mandate on 21 April 2017 as a replacement for Marko Blagojević.
Dragan Jovanović	-	Better Serbia	Topola	1972	Member of New Serbia until January 2017. Subsequently an independent until September 2017.
Jadranka Jovanović	Progressive	-	Belgrade	1958	
Jovan Jovanović	Independent MPs Club	Civic Platform	Belgrade	1970	Awarded mandate on 10 August 2016 as a replacement for Svetlana Kozić. Member of Dosta je bilo until February 2017. Subsequently an independent until April 2017.
Nataša Jovanović	Radical	Serbian Radical Party	Kragujevac	1966	
Nataša Jovanović	Progressive	Serbian Progressive Party	Belgrade, Mladenovac	1967	
Neđo Jovanović	Socialist	Socialist Party of Serbia	Užice	1962	Awarded mandate on 5 October 2016 as a replacement for Slavica Đukić Dejanović.
Čedomir Jovanović	LDP–SDA	Liberal Democratic Party	Belgrade	1971	
Radoslav Jović	Progressive	Serbian Progressive Party	Kraljevo	1957	Awarded mandate on 5 October 2016 as a replacement for Andreja Mladenović.
Petar Jojić	Radical	Serbian Radical Party	Pančevo	1938	
Mihailo Jokić	Progressive	Serbian Progressive Party	Valjevo	1948	
Nikola Jolović	Progressive	Serbian Progressive Party	Novi Pazar	1977	
Aleksandar Jugović	Progressive	Serbian Renewal Movement	Čačak	1975	
Jasmina Karanac	SDPS	Social Democratic Party of Serbia	Belgrade, New Belgrade	1967	
Ana Karadžić	PS–NSS–USS	Movement of Socialists	Belgrade, Voždovac	1988	
Dragomir Karić	Progressive	Strength of Serbia Movement	Belgrade	1949	
Milanka Karić	Progressive	Strength of Serbia Movement	Belgrade	1957	
Blaža Knežević	Progressive	Serbian Progressive Party	Šabac	1968	
Milan Knežević	Progressive	Serbian Progressive Party	Kragujevac	1952	
Elvira Kovács	VMSZ	Alliance of Vojvodina Hungarians	Zrenjanin	1982	
Borisav Kovačević	PUPS	Party of United Pensioners of Serbia	Belgrade, Zemun	1943	
Goran Kovačević	Progressive	Serbian Progressive Party	Kragujevac	1970	
Studenka Kovačević	Progressive	Serbian Progressive Party	Bor	1982	Awarded mandate on 5 October 2016 as a replacement for Goran Knežević.
Đorđe Komlenski	PS–NSS–USS	Movement of Socialists	Obrenovac, Voždovac	1965	
Stanija Kompirović	Progressive	Serbian Progressive Party	Kosovska Mitrovica	1968	
Nenad Konstantinović	Vojvodina Front–Serbia 21	Serbia 21	Belgrade	1973	
Žarko Korać	LDP–SDA	Liberal Democratic Party	Belgrade	1947	
Đorđe Kosanić	United Serbia	United Serbia	Kragujevac	1967	
Nevenka Kostadinova	Progressive	Serbian Progressive Party	Bosilegrad	1972	Awarded mandate on 7 October 2019 as a replacement for Miroslav Lazanski.
Dragana Kostić	Progressive	Serbian Progressive Party	Sokobanja	1971	
Ivan Kostić	-	Dveri	Vrbas	1975	
Nada Kostić	-	Democratic Party	Belgrade	1956	Awarded mandate on 17 April 2018 as a replacement for Miloš Bošković. Briefly a member of the Movement for the Restoration of the Kingdom of Serbia in May 2018. Kostić is a member of the Democratic Party but not of its assembly group.
Radmilo Kostić	Progressive	Serbian Progressive Party	Pirot	1971	
Milovan Krivokapić	Progressive	Serbian Progressive Party	Kosovska Mitrovica	1949	
Mirko Krlić	Progressive	Serbian Progressive Party	Zrenjanin	1955	
Nada Lazić	Vojvodina Front–Serbia 21	League of Social Democrats of Vojvodina	Novi Sad	1950	
Darko Laketić	Progressive	Serbian Progressive Party	Prokuplje	1975	
Milan Lapčević	-	-	Niš	1969	Member of the Democratic Party of Serbia until April 2018.
Miodrag Linta	Progressive	-	Belgrade, New Belgrade	1969	
Mladen Lukić	Progressive	Serbian Progressive Party	Bajina Bašta	1977	Awarded mandate on 5 October 2016 as a replacement for Živko Vrcelj.
Violeta Lutovac Đurđević	Progressive	Serbian Progressive Party	Varvarin	1986	Awarded mandate on 13 February 2019 as a replacement for Ivana Stojiljković.
Tomislav Ljubenović	Radical	Serbian Radical Party	Leskovac	1951	
Milan Ljubić	Progressive	Serbian Progressive Party	Niš	1978	Awarded mandate on 13 February 2019 as a replacement for Ljibuška Lakatoš.
Aleksandra Majkić	Progressive	Serbian Progressive Party	Kikinda	1979	
Aleksandra Maletić	Progressive	Serbian Progressive Party	Novi Sad	1982	
Ljiljana Malušić	Progressive	Serbian Progressive Party	Belgrade, Voždovac	1958	
Momčilo Mandić	Radical	Serbian Radical Party	Belgrade	1954	
Marjana Maraš	Socialist	Socialist Party of Serbia	Vrbas	1970	
Vladimir Marinković; Vice-President of the National Assembly	SDPS	Social Democratic Party of Serbia	Belgrade, Voždovac	1976	
Vesna Marjanović	DS	Democratic Party	Belgrade, Palilula	1969	
Miroslav Markićević	NS–Movement for Serbia's Salvation	New Serbia	Čačak	1958	
Aleksandar Marković	Progressive	Serbian Progressive Party	Belgrade	1981	
Vesna Marković	Progressive	Serbian Progressive Party	Belgrade, Zemun	1974	
Dragan Marković Palma	United Serbia	United Serbia	Jagodina	1960	
Aleksandar Martinović	Progressive	Serbian Progressive Party	Ruma	1976	
Veroljub Matić	Progressive	Serbian Progressive Party	Koceljeva	1953	
Tatjana Macura	Party of Modern Serbia	Party of Modern Serbia	Belgrade	1981	Member of Dosta je bilo until April 2018.
Maja Mačužić Puzić	Progressive	Serbian Progressive Party	Kraljevo	1977	
Ostoja Mijailović	Progressive	Serbian Progressive Party	Čačak	1979	
Jelena Mijatović	Progressive	Serbian Progressive Party	Belgrade	1977	
Milorad Mijatović	SDPS	Social Democratic Party of Serbia	Novi Sad	1947	
Stefana Miladinović	Socialist	Socialist Party of Serbia	Belgrade, Rakovica	1981	
Zoran Milekić	Progressive	Serbian Progressive Party	Kučevo	1955	
Milija Miletić	PS–NSS–USS	United Peasant Party	Svrljig	1968	
Dušan Milisavljević	DS	Democratic Party	Niš	1968	Awarded mandate on 21 April 2017 as a replacement for Bojan Pajtić.
Nenad Milić	LDP–SDA	Liberal Democratic Party	Belgrade	1962	
Đorđe Milićević; Vice-President of the National Assembly	Socialist	Socialist Party of Serbia	Valjevo	1978	
Milosav Milojević	Progressive	Serbian Progressive Party	Aranđelovac	1954	
Radoslav Milojičić	DS	Democratic Party	Smederevska Palanka	1984	
Milorad Mirčić	Radical	Serbian Radical Party	Novi Sad	1956	
Nenad Mitrović	Progressive	Serbian Progressive Party	Bujanovac	1973	Awarded mandate on 10 August 2016 as a replacement for Ljiljana Habjanović Đurović.
Žarko Mićin	Progressive	Serbian Progressive Party	Novi Sad	1982	
Nataša Mićić	LDP–SDA	Liberal Democratic Party	Užice	1965	
Dragoljub Mićunović	DS	Democratic Party	Belgrade	1930	
Nataša Mihailović Vacić	SDPS	Social Democratic Party of Serbia	Belgrade, Vračar	1972	
Branislav Mihajlović	Independent MPs Club	-	Bor	1953	Member of Dosta je bilo until November 2018.
Ljiljana Mihajlović	Radical	Serbian Radical Party	Novi Sad	1965	
Miletić Mihajlović	Socialist	Socialist Party of Serbia	Petrovac	1951	
Ljupka Mihajlovska	Party of Modern Serbia	Party of Modern Serbia	Belgrade	1981	Member of Dosta je bilo until March 2018.
Ljubica Mrdaković Todorović	Progressive	Serbian Progressive Party	Niš	1962	
Milutin Mrkonjić	Socialist	Socialist Party of Serbia	Belgrade	1942	
Goran Nikolić	Progressive	Serbian Progressive Party	Odžaci	1967	
Dejan Nikolić	DS	Democratic Party	Sokobanja	1979	
Ivana Nikolić	Progressive	Serbian Progressive Party	Ub	1989	
Ružica Nikolić	Radical	Serbian Radical Party	Belgrade	1976	Awarded mandate on 19 July 2017 as a replacement for Jovo Ostojić.
Vesna Nikolić Vukajlović	Radical	Serbian Radical Party	Kraljevo	1962	
Svetlana Nikolić Pavlović	Progressive	Serbian Progressive Party	Ćuprija	1955	
Srđan Nogo	-	-	Belgrade	1981	Member of Dveri until 19 February 2019.
Bogdan Obradović	Progressive	-	Belgrade	1966	
Boško Obradović	-	Dveri	Čačak	1976	
Žarko Obradović	Socialist	Socialist Party of Serbia	Belgrade, Vračar	1960	
Jasmina Obradović	Progressive	Serbian Progressive Party	Novi Sad	1961	
Marija Obradović	Progressive	Serbian Progressive Party	Belgrade	1974	
Olivera Ognjanović	Progressive	Serbian Progressive Party	Belgrade, Grocka	1969	
Vladimir Orlić	Progressive	Serbian Progressive Party	Belgrade	1983	
Sonja Pavlović	Independent MPs Club	Civic Platform	Belgrade	1957	Member of Dosta je bilo until February 2017. Subsequently an independent until April 2017.
Jovan Palalić	Progressive	Serbian People's Party	Bačka Palanka	1971	
Biljana Pantić Pilja	Progressive	Serbian Progressive Party	Novi Sad	1983	
Ognjen Pantović	Progressive	Serbian People's Party	Belgrade, Palilula	1989	
Olena Papuga	Vojvodina Front–Serbia 21	League of Social Democrats of Vojvodina	Kula	1964	
Marko Parezanović	Progressive	Serbian Progressive Party	Čačak	1986	
Balint Pastor	VMSZ	Alliance of Vojvodina Hungarians	Subotica	1979	
Snežana Paunović	Socialist	Socialist Party of Serbia	Peć	1975	
Zoltan Pek	VMSZ	Alliance of Vojvodina Hungarians	Senta	1962	
Goran Pekarski	Progressive	Serbian Progressive Party	Belgrade, Grocka	1965	Awarded mandate on 9 December 2016 as a replacement for Velimir Stanojević. A member of New Serbia until October 2017.
Sreto Perić	Radical	Serbian Radical Party	Ljubovija	1959	
Vladimir Petković	Progressive	Serbian Progressive Party	Belgrade, Barajevo	1979	
Dušan Petrović	DS	Together for Serbia	Šabac	1966	
Mira Petrović	PUPS	Party of United Pensioners of Serbia	Belgrade, New Belgrade	1956	
Petar Petrović	United Serbia	United Serbia	Jagodina	1951	
Snežana Petrović	PUPS	Party of United Pensioners of Serbia	Belgrade, New Belgrade	1972	
Snežana Petrović	Progressive	Serbian People's Party	Užice	1965	
Milisav Petronijević	Socialist	Socialist Party of Serbia	Belgrade	1949	Awarded mandate on 5 October 2016 as a replacement for Aleksandar Antić.
Olivera Pešić	Progressive	Serbian Progressive Party	Leskovac	1979	
Branko Popović	Progressive	Serbian Progressive Party	Nova Varoš	1975	Awarded mandate on 12 October 2017 as a replacement for Branislav Blažić.
Dejan Radenković	Socialist	Socialist Party of Serbia	Priština	1971	Awarded mandate on 19 July 2017 as a replacement for Branko Ružić.
Vjerica Radeta; Vice-President of the National Assembly	Radical	Serbian Radical Party	Belgrade, Zemun	1955	
Dalibor Radičević	Progressive	Serbian Progressive Party	Aleksinac	1976	
Nemanja Radojević	Party of Modern Serbia	Party of Modern Serbia	Kragujevac	1989	Awarded mandate on 22 January 2019 as a replacement for Dušan Pavlović.
Zoran Radojičić	-	-	Belgrade, Obrenovac	1975	Member of Dveri until April 2019.
Saša Radulović	-	Dosta je bilo	Belgrade	1965	
Katarina Rakić	Progressive	Serbian Progressive Party	Belgrade, Grocka	1979	
Ljubinko Rakonjac	Socialist	Greens of Serbia	Belgrade	1963	
Branimir Rančić	Progressive	Serbian Progressive Party	Niš	1953	
Sanda Rašković Ivić	NS–Movement for Serbia's Salvation	People's Party	Belgrade, Palilula	1956	Member of the Democratic Party of Serbia until October 2016. Subsequently an independent until October 2017.
Desanka Repac	Progressive	Serbian Progressive Party	Subotica	1949	
Marina Ristić	Radical	Serbian Radical Party	Belgrade	1974	
Slaviša Ristić	NS–Movement for Serbia's Salvation	Fatherland	Zubin Potok	1961	Member of the Democratic Party of Serbia until October 2016. Subsequently an independent until January 2017.
Marijan Rističević	PS–NSS–USS	People's Peasant Party	Inđija	1958	
Nikola Savić	Radical	Serbian Radical Party	Niš	1959	
Dragan Savkić	Progressive	Serbian Progressive Party	Belgrade, Sopot	1947	
Branka Stamenković	-	Dosta je bilo	Belgrade	1968	
Zdravko Stanković	DS	Social Democratic Party	Belgrade	1980	
Miroslava Stanković Đuričić	Radical	Serbian Radical Party	Smederevska Palanka	1976	
Aleksandar Stevanović	Party of Modern Serbia	Party of Modern Serbia	Belgrade	1981	Member of Dosta je bilo until March 2018.
Ana Stevanović	Independent MPs Club	Party of Freedom and Justice	Belgrade	1984	Member of Dosta je bilo until November 2018. Subsequently an independent until April 2019.
Veroljub Stevanović	DS	Together for Šumadija	Kragujevac	1946	
Zvonimir Stević	Socialist	Socialist Party of Serbia	Priština	1957	
Danijela Stojadinović	Socialist	Socialist Party of Serbia	Svilajnac	1969	
Filip Stojanović	Radical	Serbian Radical Party	Belgrade	1944	Awarded mandate on 21 April 2017 as a replacement for Marko Milenković.
Dušica Stojković	Progressive	Serbian Progressive Party	Belgrade	1979	
Ljubiša Stojmirović	Progressive	Serbian Progressive Party	Belgrade	1950	
Hadži Milorad Stošić	PUPS	Party of United Pensioners of Serbia	Niš	1954	
Duško Tarbuk	Progressive	Serbian Progressive Party	Belgrade, Zemun	1972	
Marinika Tepić	Independent MPs Club	Party of Freedom and Justice	Pančevo	1974	Member of the League of Social Democrats of Vojvodina until January 2017. Subsequently an independent until April 2017, when she joined the New Party. Subsequently an independent member again from 2018 to April 2019.
Tanja Tomašević Damnjanović	Progressive	Serbian Progressive Party	Vršac	1982	
Aleksandra Tomić	Progressive	Serbian Progressive Party	Belgrade	1969	
Novica Tončev	Socialist	Socialist Party of Serbia	Surdulica	1962	
Bojan Torbica	PS–NSS–USS	Movement of Socialists	Bački Jarak	1974	
Milena Turk	Progressive	Serbian Progressive Party	Trstenik	1986	
Goran Ćirić	DS	Democratic Party	Niš	1960	
Milena Ćorilić	PUPS	Party of United Pensioners of Serbia	Šabac	1944	
Jahja Fehratović	-	Justice and Reconciliation Party	Novi Pazar	1982	
Srbislav Filipović	Progressive	Serbian Progressive Party	Belgrade	1984	
Dubravka Filipovski	Progressive	Serbian Progressive Party	Belgrade	1967	Member of New Serbia until January 2017. Subsequently an independent until November 2017.
Arpad Fremond	VMSZ	Alliance of Vojvodina Hungarians	Pačir	1981	
Fatmir Hasani	LDP–SDA	Party for Democratic Action	Bujanovac	1957	
Radoslav Cokić	Progressive	Serbian Progressive Party	Smederevska Palanka	1958	
Goran Čabradi	-	Green Party	Novi Sad	1968	
Aleksandra Čabraja	-	-	Belgrade	1965	Member of Dosta je bilo until February 2017. Subsequently an independent until April 2017, when she joined the Civic Platform. Subsequently an independent again from March to April 2019, when she joined the Green Party. Appears to have left the Green Party in 2019 or 2020.
Nenad Čanak	Vojvodina Front–Serbia 21	League of Social Democrats of Vojvodina	Novi Sad	1959	
Ana Čarapić	Progressive	Serbian Progressive Party	Kuršumlija	1985	Awarded mandate on 21 September 2017 as a replacement for Aleksandra Đurović.
Momo Čolaković	PUPS	Party of United Pensioners of Serbia	Novi Sad	1940	
Gordana Čomić; Vice-President of the National Assembly	DS	-	Novi Sad	1958	Member of the Democratic Party until May 2020.
Aleksandar Čotrić	Progressive	Serbian Renewal Movement	Belgrade	1966	
Nemanja Šarović	Radical	Serbian Radical Party	Belgrade	1974	
Miladin Ševarlić	-	-	Belgrade, Zemun	1949	
Aleksandar Šešelj	Radical	Serbian Radical Party	Belgrade, Zemun	1993	Awarded mandate on 21 September 2017 as a replacement for Milovan Bojić.
Vojislav Šešelj	Radical	Serbian Radical Party	Belgrade, Zemun	1954	
Dragan Šormaz	Progressive	Serbian Progressive Party	Smederevo	1967	
Dejan Šulkić	-	Democratic Party of Serbia	Velika Plana	1972	

== List of members of the 11th National Assembly who left prior to its dissolution ==
Name	Political Party or Movement	Term of Office	Year of birth	Cause of departure
Aleksandar Antić	Socialist Party of Serbia	3 June 2016 – 11 August 2016	1969	Resignation
Konstantin Arsenović	Party of United Pensioners of Serbia	3 June 2016 – 30 January 2017	1940	Death
Marko Blagojević	Independent (aligned with Serbian Progressive Party)	3 June 2016 – 19 April 2017	1976	Resignation
Branislav Blažić	Serbian Progressive Party	3 June 2016 – 10 October 2017	1957	Resignation
Milovan Bojić	Serbian Radical Party	3 June 2016 – 30 August 2017	1957	Resignation
Miloš Bošković	Dosta je bilo	3 June 2016 – 16 March 2018	1985	Resignation
Živko Vrcelj	Serbian Progressive Party	3 June 2016 – 12 August 2016	1959	Resignation
Aleksandar Vučić	Serbian Progressive Party	3 June 2016 – 3 June 2016	1970	Resignation
Marko Gavrilović	Serbian Progressive Party	3 June 2016 – 11 October 2017	1978	Resignation
Ivica Dačić	Socialist Party of Serbia	3 June 2016 – 11 August 2016	1966	Resignation
Slavica Đukić Dejanović	Socialist Party of Serbia	3 June 2016 – 11 August 2016	1951	Resignation
Aleksandra Đurović	Serbian Progressive Party	3 June 2016 – 8 September 2017	1976	Resignation
Ljiljana Habjanović Đurović	Independent (aligned with Serbian Progressive Party)	3 June 2016 – 3 June 2016	1970	Resignation
Ratko Jankov	Independent (previously Dosta je bilo)	3 June 2016 – 13 November 2018	1945	Resignation
Ivan Karić	Greens of Serbia	3 June 2016 – 9 October 2017	1975	Resignation
Goran Knežević	Serbian Progressive Party	3 June 2016 – 11 August 2016	1957	Resignation
Svetlana Kozić	Dosta je bilo	3 June 2016 – 6 June 2016	1978	Resignation
Zoran Krasić	Serbian Radical Party	3 June 2016 – 12 April 2018	1956	Death
Milan Krkobabić	Party of United Pensioners of Serbia	3 June 2016 – 11 August 2016	1952	Resignation
Srđan Kružević	United Serbia	3 June 2016 – 1 August 2016	1977	Resignation
Ljibuška Lakatoš	Serbian Progressive Party	3 June 2016 – 25 December 2018	1972	Resignation
Miroslav Lazanski	Independent (aligned with Serbian Progressive Party)	3 June 2016 – 25 September 2019	1950	Resignation
Rasim Ljajić	Social Democratic Party of Serbia	3 June 2016 – 6 June 2016	1964	Resignation
Ivan Manojlović	Serbian Progressive Party	3 June 2016 – 21 September 2018	1975	Resignation
Marko Milenković	Serbian Radical Party	3 June 2016 – 12 April 2017	1974	Resignation
Andreja Mladenović	Independent Democratic Party of Serbia	3 June 2016 – 3 October 2016	1975	Resignation
Jasmina Nikolić	Independent (previously Dosta je bilo)	3 June 2016 – 13 November 2018	1971	Resignation
Meho Omerović	Social Democratic Party of Serbia	3 June 2016 – 17 July 2018	1959	Resignation
Jovo Ostojić	Serbian Radical Party	3 June 2016 – 29 June 2017	1952	Death
Bojan Pajtić	Democratic Party	3 June 2016 – 11 April 2017	1970	Resignation
Vera Paunović	Party of United Pensioners of Serbia	5 October 2016 – 21 February 2020	1947	Death
Dušan Pavlović	Independent (previously Dosta je bilo)	3 June 2016 – 13 November 2018	1969	Resignation
Gordana Predić	Social Democratic Party of Serbia	3 June 2016 – 23 August 2016	1965	Resignation
Vesna Rakonjac	Serbian Progressive Party	3 June 2016 – 21 December 2017	1967	Resignation
Biljana Rubaković	Dveri	3 June 2016 – 22 June 2016	1960	Resignation
Branko Ružić	Socialist Party of Serbia	3 June 2016 – 29 June 2017	1975	Resignation
Ivana Stojiljković	Serbian Progressive Party	3 June 2016 – 24 December 2018	1981	Resignation
Miroljub Stanković	Party of United Pensioners of Serbia	3 June 2016 – 22 July 2017	1946	Death
Velimir Stanojević	New Serbia	3 June 2016 – 1 December 2016	1964	Resignation
Željko Sušec	Serbian Progressive Party	3 June 2016 – 4 June 2018	1977	Resignation
Ivica Tončev	Socialist Party of Serbia	3 June 2016 – 16 December 2016	1968	Resignation
Sulejman Ugljanin	Party of Democratic Action of Sandžak	3 June 2016 – 28 June 2016	1953	Resignation
