= Grozdana =

Grozdana is a feminine given name. Notable people with the name include:

- Grozdana Banac (born 1951), Serbian politician
- Grozdana Olujić (1934–2019), Serbian writer, translator, editor, and critic
