= 11th National Assembly =

11th National Assembly may refer to:

- 11th National Assembly of France
- 11th National Assembly of Pakistan
- 11th National Assembly of Serbia
- 11th National Assembly of South Korea
