= Dušan Pavlović =

Dušan Pavlović may refer to:

- Dušan Pavlović (economist) (born 1969), Serbian political economist and politician
- Dušan Pavlović (footballer) (born 1977), Serbian-Swiss football player
