= Marko Blagojević =

Marko Blagojević may refer to:

- Marko Blagojević (born 1974), Serbian politician and minister in the government of Serbia
- Marko Blagojević (born 1976), Serbian politician and diplomat
