= Jelisaveta Veljković =

Serbian politician

Jelisaveta Veljković (Serbian Cyrillic: Јелисавета Вељковић; 1951 – 12 January 2023) was a politician from Serbia. She served in the National Assembly of Serbia on an almost continuous basis since 2014 as a member of the Party of United Pensioners of Serbia (PUPS), until her death.

== Private career ==
Veljković was a retired teacher living in Sremski Karlovci, Vojvodina.

== Political career ==
The PUPS contested the 2014 Serbian parliamentary election on an electoral list led by the Socialist Party of Serbia. Veljković received the thirty-ninth position on the list and was elected when the list won forty-four mandates. The PUPS did not participate in Serbia's government during the parliament that followed but provided external support to the government in the assembly.

For the 2016 parliamentary election, the PUPS formed a new alliance with the Serbian Progressive Party, and Veljković received the 231st position (out of 250) on the Progressive-led Aleksandar Vučić – Serbia Is Winning list. This was too low a position for direct election to be a realistic prospect, and she was not initially elected even as the list won a majority victory with 131 mandates. She did, however, receive a new mandate on 21 April 2017 as a replacement for Konstantin Arsenović, who had died in January of that year. The PUPS was by this time part of Serbia's coalition government, and Veljković again served as a government supporter in the assembly.

She received the 129th position on the Progressive Party's Aleksandar Vučić — For Our Children coalition list in the 2020 Serbian parliamentary election and was elected to a third term when the list won a landslide majority with 188 mandates. She was a member of the committee on the rights of the child and the agriculture, forestry, and water management committee; a deputy member of the committee on human and minority rights and gender equality and the European Union–Serbia stabilization and association committee; and a member of the parliamentary friendship groups with Fiji, Finland, Italy, Japan, Russia, and Switzerland.
