= Vojin Biljić =

Serbian politician

- Војин Биљић

Member of the National Assembly of the Republic of Serbia
- In office 13 February 2019 – 3 August 2020

Personal details
- Born: 1977 (age 48–49) Titovo Užice, SR Serbia, SFR Yugoslavia
- Party: DJB (2014–present)

Vojin Biljić (Serbian Cyrillic: Војин Биљић; born 1977) is a Serbian politician. He served in the Serbian national assembly from 2019 to 2020 as a member of Enough Is Enough (DJB).

== Early life and private career ==
Biljić was born in Titovo Užice, in what was then the Socialist Republic of Serbia in the Socialist Federal Republic of Yugoslavia. He graduated from the University of Belgrade Faculty of Law in 2002, completed advanced specialist studies in European Union law at Nancy 2 University in France in 2003, and subsequently enrolled in post-graduate studies in Belgrade. Biljić passed the bar exam in 2005 and began a private law practice in the same year, specializing in European law.

He received the rank of reserve second lieutenant in the Armed Forces of Serbia and Montenegro in 2005.

== Politician ==
Biljić joined DJB on its formation in 2014, when the movement was considered liberal and reformist. He was given the twenty-first position on its electoral list in the 2016 Serbian parliamentary election; the list won sixteen mandates, and he was not immediately elected. He also received the fifth position on the movement's list for the Belgrade municipality of Vračar in the concurrent 2016 Serbian local elections and was elected when the list won seven mandates. He served in the municipal assembly for the four-year term that followed.

For the 2018 Belgrade city assembly election, DJB somewhat unexpectedly formed an alliance with the hard-right Dveri party, and Biljić appeared in the lead position on their combined list. During the campaign, he acknowledged that DJB and Dveri had profoundly different ideologies but defended the coalition as necessary to fight corruption in the country. He also argued for reducing the price of public transportation and providing free textbooks and kindergarten courses. The DJB–Dveri list did not cross the electoral threshold to win representation in the city assembly.

DJB itself shifted to the radical right following the 2018 election, prompting a number of resignations. Biljić remained a member of the movement.

=== Parliamentarian ===
Biljić was awarded a national assembly mandate in January 2019 as a replacement for Jasmina Nikolić, who had resigned. He took his seat on 13 February and served in opposition to Serbia's government dominated by the Serbian Progressive Party (SNS) for the remainder of the 2016–20 term.

The DJB movement contested the 2020 Serbian parliamentary election as the dominant party in the Sovereignists coalition. Biljić appeared in the third position on its list, which did not cross the electoral threshold. The coalition did not field a list in Vračar in the concurrent 2020 Serbian local elections, and his term in the municipal assembly came to an end.

=== 2022 and 2023 elections ===
Biljić was the mayoral candidate of the Sovereignists alliance in the 2022 Belgrade city assembly election and held the lead position on its electoral list. (Note: Serbian mayors are not directly elected; Biljić was technically DJB's presumptive nominee for mayor in the event that the party won the election.) He again ran on an anti-corruption platform and charged that Serbia's sovereignty was being ceded to supranational organizations such as the European Union, the North Atlantic Treaty Organization, and, with reference to COVID-19 social restrictions, the World Health Organization. The list did not cross the electoral threshold. Biljić also appeared in the fourth position on the Sovereignists list in the concurrent 2022 parliamentary election. This list also failed to cross the threshold.

DJB contested the 2023 Serbian parliamentary election in an alliance with the Social Democratic Party (SDS), and Biljić appeared in the fifth position on their combined list. He also appeared in the sixth position on the alliance's list in the concurrent Belgrade city assembly election. The alliance did not cross the threshold at either level.
