= Aleksandra Jevtić =

Serbian politician

Aleksandra Jevtić (Serbian Cyrillic: Александра Јевтић; born 14 February 1976), formerly known as Aleksandra Jevtić Vukmirović is a politician in Serbia. She served in the National Assembly of Serbia from 2018 to 2020 as a member of the Serbian Progressive Party.

== Private career ==
Jevtić has a Ph.D. in Biotechnical Sciences. She lives in Vrnjačka Banja.

== Politician ==
=== Municipal politics ===
Jevtić was awarded the ninth position on the Progressive Party's electoral list for the Vrnjačka Banja municipal assembly in the 2012 Serbian local elections and was elected when the list won exactly nine mandates. She did not seek re-election at the local level in 2016.

=== Parliamentarian ===
Jevtić received the 146th position on the Progressive Party's Aleksandar Vučić – Serbia Is Winning electoral list in the 2016 Serbian parliamentary election. The list won a majority victory with 131 out of 250 mandates; Jevtić was not directly elected but was awarded a mandate on 26 September 2018 as a replacement for Ivan Manojlović, who had resigned. She was a member of the environmental protection committee and the agriculture, forestry, and water management committee, as well as Serbia's parliamentary friendship groups with Bolivia, China, Cyprus, Greece, Russia, and Turkey.

She was given the 248th position on the Progressive Party's Aleksandar Vučić — For Our Children coalition list in the 2020 Serbian parliamentary election Direct election from this position was mathematically impossible, and indeed she was not elected even as the list won a landslide majority with 188 mandates. It is possible, though unlikely, that Jevtić may return to parliament in the current term of the assembly as the replacement for another Progressive Party member.
