= Andrijana Avramov =

Serbian politician (born 1979)

Andrijana Avramov (Serbian Cyrillic: Андријана Аврамов; born 1979) is a Serbian politician. She has served in the National Assembly of Serbia since 22 January 2019 as a member of the Serbian Progressive Party.

== Education ==
Avramov has a bachelor's degree in economics and lives in Belgrade.

== Politics ==
=== Municipal politics ===
Avramov began her political career as a member of the Liberal Democratic Party (LDP). In 2012, the LDP formed an electoral alliance with the Serbian Renewal Movement and other parties called Preokret (generally known in English as "U-Turn"). Avramov received the third position on the Preokret electoral list for the Savski Venac municipal assembly in Belgrade in the 2012 Serbian local elections and was elected when the list won four mandates. She subsequently left the LDP to join the Dosta je bilo (DJB) group, known in English as "Enough Is Enough," and appeared on the fourth position on its list for Savski Venac in the 2016 local elections. She was re-elected when the list won seven mandates. She did not seek re-election at the local level in 2020.

=== Parliamentarian ===
Avramov received the twenty-second position on DJB's electoral list in the 2016 Serbian parliamentary election. The list won sixteen seats, and she was not initially elected. She was, however, awarded a mandate in January 2019 as a replacement for Ratko Jankov, who had resigned. The DJB had experienced several splits by this time, and Avramov indicated that she would neither join the DJB assembly group nor align herself the Party of Modern Serbia, a separate grouping of former DJB members. When she formally accepted her mandate on 13 February 2019, she chose to sit with the parliamentary group of the governing Serbian Progressive Party. She later became a member of the party. During her first term in parliament, she was a deputy member of the committee on education, science, technological development, and the information society, and a member of the parliamentary friendship groups with Austria, Belgium, China, Croatia, Cyprus, France, Germany, Greece, Indonesia, Italy, Malta, Montenegro, Qatar, Spain, Switzerland, Uganda, the United Arab Emirates, and the United Kingdom.

Avramov received the ninety-third position on the Progressive Party's Aleksandar Vučić — For Our Children electoral list in the 2020 election and was elected to a second term when the list won a landslide majority with 188 of out 250 mandates. She is now a member of the committee on human and minority rights and gender equality; a deputy member of the European integration committee, the security services control committee, and the committee on administrative, budgetary, mandate, and immunity issues; a deputy member of Serbia's delegation to the NATO Parliamentary Assembly (where Serbia has observer status); and a member of the parliamentary friendship groups with Bosnia and Herzegovina, China, Croatia, France, Germany, Greece, Italy, Montenegro, Morocco, the Netherlands, Norway, Russia, Slovenia, Spain, the United Arab Emirates, and the United States of America.
