= Sandra Božić =

Serbian politician

- Сандра Божић
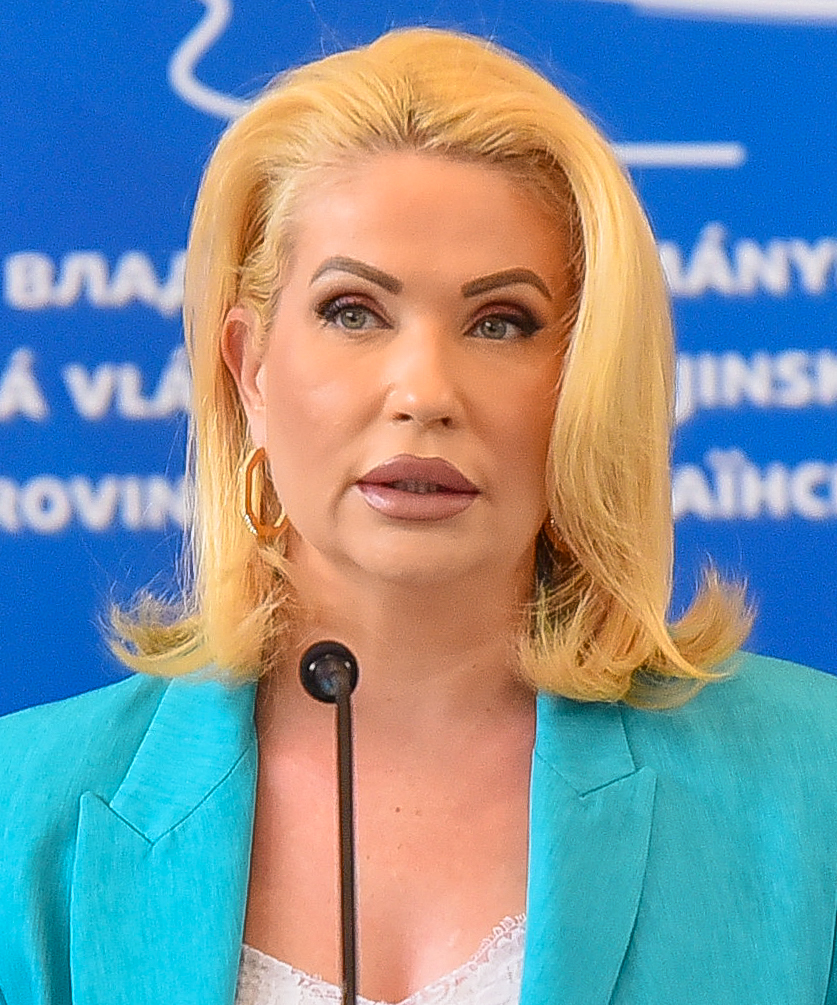
- Božić in 2024

Deputy prime minister of the Provincial Government of Vojvodina
- Incumbent
- Assumed office 8 May 2024
- President: Maja Gojković

Vice-president of the National Assembly of Serbia
- In office 2 August 2022 – 7 May 2024
- President: Vladimir Orlić; Ana Brnabić

Member of the National Assembly of Serbia
- In office 6 March 2018 – 7 May 2024

Personal details
- Born: 15 October 1979 (age 47) Pančevo, SR Serbia, SFR Yugoslavia
- Party: SNS

Sandra Božić (Serbian Cyrillic: Сандра Божић; born 15 October 1979) is a Serbian politician who has served as deputy prime minister of the Government of Vojvodina since 2024. She served a vice-president of the National Assembly of Serbia from 2022 to 2024, she also served as a member of the National Assembly from 2018 to 2024 and as the deputy leader of the For Our Children parliamentary group from 2020 to 2022.

== Early life and private career ==
Božić was born in Pančevo, Vojvodina, in what was then the Socialist Republic of Serbia in the Socialist Federal Republic of Yugoslavia on 15 October 1979. She holds a degree in political science and was the head of the public utility Grejanje from 2015 to 2018.

== Political career ==
Božić received the 186th position on the Progressive Party's Aleksandar Vučić — Future We Believe In electoral list in the 2014 parliamentary election. The list won a majority with 158 out of 250 seats; Božić was not elected and did not serve in assembly that followed. She received the 144th position on the successor Aleksandar Vučić — Future We Believe In electoral list in the 2016 election. The list won 131 mandates, and she was once again not immediately elected; she was, however, awarded a mandate on 6 March 2018, as a replacement for Vesna Rakonjac.

During the 2016–20 parliament, Božić was a member of the assembly committee on the rights of the child and the committee on labour, social issues, social inclusion, and poverty reduction; a deputy member of the defence and internal affairs committee, the health and family committee, and the committee on administrative, budgetary, mandate, and immunity issues; a substitute member of Serbia's delegation to the Parliamentary Dimension of the Central European Initiative; and a member of the parliamentary friendship groups with Austria, Azerbaijan, China, Germany, Ghana, Greece, Portugal, Russia, Sweden, and the United States of America.

Božić and fellow Progressive Party parliamentarian Aleksandar Martinović went on a two-day hunger strike in May 2020, to protest the inaction of Serbia's prosecution and judiciary against what they described as the violent behaviour of Dveri leader Boško Obradović. The strike ended after President Vučić urged the parliamentarians to call it off.

She was promoted to the seventeenth position on the Progressive Party's Aleksandar Vučić — For Our Children list for the 2020 Serbian parliamentary election and was elected to a second term when the list won a landslide victory with 188 mandates. After the election, she was chosen as deputy leader of the Aleksandar Vučić — For Our Children parliamentary group. She is also the chair of the culture and information committee; a full member of the committee on administrative, budgetary, mandate, and immunity issues; a deputy member of the security services control committee; a member of the European Union–Serbia stabilization and association committee; the leader of Serbia's parliamentary friendship group with the United Kingdom; and a member of the parliamentary friendship groups with China, France, Germany, Ireland, Italy, Japan, Morocco, Russia, Spain, Sweden, Turkey, the United Arab Emirates, and the United States of America.

On May 8, 2024, Sandra Božić was elected as Deputy Prime Minister of the Provincial Government of Vojvodina.
