= Violeta Lutovac Đurđević =

Serbian politician

Violeta Lutovac Đurđević (Serbian Cyrillic: Виолета Лутовац Ђурђевић; born 31 August 1986), formerly known as Violeta Lutovac, is a politician in Serbia. She served in the National Assembly of Serbia from 2014 to 2016 and returned to the assembly to begin a second mandate on 13 February 2019. Lutovac Đurđević is a member of the Serbian Progressive Party.

== Private career ==
Lutovac Đurđević is a medical doctor based in Varvarin.

== Political career ==
Lutovac Đurđević entered politics at the municipal level in Varvarin. She was given the ninth position on the Progressive-led Let's Get Varvarin Moving electoral list in the 2012 Serbian local elections and, as the list won only five mandates, was not initially elected. She was awarded a mandate on 22 February 2013 as the replacement for another member. She was promoted to the second position on the party's list in the 2016 local elections and was re-elected when the list won seventeen mandates. Lutovac Đurđević was chosen as deputy mayor of Varvarin on 9 June 2016 and served for a time in this position. She remains a member of the municipal assembly as of 2019.

Lutovac Đurđević received the 153rd position on the Progressive Party's Aleksandar Vučić — Future We Believe In electoral list for the 2014 Serbian parliamentary election and was elected when the list won a landslide victory with 158 out of 250 mandates. For the next two years, she served in parliament as a supporter of Vučić's government. She was promoted to the 147th position on the successor Aleksandar Vučić — Serbia is Winning list in the 2016 Serbian parliamentary election and was not immediately re-elected when the list won a second, narrower majority victory with 131 mandates. She returned to the assembly on 23 February 2019 as a replacement for Ivana Stojiljković, who had resigned.
