= Vera Jovanović =

Serbian politician (born 1947)

Vera Jovanović (Serbian Cyrillic: Вера Јовановић; born 1947) is a politician in Serbia. She served in the National Assembly of Serbia from 2017 to 2020 as a member of the Serbian Progressive Party.

== Early life and career ==
Jovanović was born in Belgrade, in what was then the People's Republic of Serbia in the Federal People's Republic of Yugoslavia. She is an economist.

== Politician ==
=== Municipal politics ===
Jovanović received the eighteenth position on the Progressive Party's Let's Get Rakovica Moving electoral list for the 2012 local elections in the Belgrade municipality of Rakovica. She narrowly missed direct election when the list won seventeen seats but was awarded a mandate on 5 July 2012 as the replacement for another party member. She served on the municipality's employment council in the term that followed. She was not a candidate for re-election at the local level in 2016.

=== Parliamentarian ===
Jovanović received the 192nd position on the Progressive Party's Aleksandar Vučić — Future We Believe In list for the 2014 Serbian parliamentary election. This was too low a position for election to be a reasonable prospect, and she was not elected despite the list winning a majority victory with 158 out of 250 seats.

She was promoted to the 138th position on the successor Aleksandar Vučić – Serbia Is Winning for the 2016 election. The list won 131 mandates, and she was again not initially elected. She received a mandate on 21 April 2017 as a replacement for Marko Blagojević, who had resigned to take an ambassadorial position. During the 2016–20 parliament, Jovanović was a member of the European integration committee; a deputy member of the foreign affairs committee and the committee on administrative, budgetary, mandate, and immunity issues; and a member of the parliamentary friendship groups with Belarus, China, Greece, India, Italy, Japan, Kazakhstan, Montenegro, Myanmar, Russia, Tunisia, Turkey, and Spain.

Jovanović was given the 219th position on the Progressive Party's Aleksandar Vučić — For Our Children list and was not re-elected even as the list won a landslide majority with 188 out of 250 mandates. It is possible, though unlikely, that she could re-enter parliament as the replacement for another Progressive Party member in the current term of the assembly.
