= Gordana Predić =

Serbian politician

Gordana Predić (Serbian Cyrillic: Гордана Предић; born 1965) is a politician, administrator, and journalist in Serbia. She briefly served in the National Assembly of Serbia in 2016 as a member of the Social Democratic Party of Serbia (SDPS).

== Early life and media career ==
Predić was born in Kragujevac, in what was then the Socialist Republic of Serbia in the Socialist Federal Republic of Yugoslavia. She graduated from the Department of History at the University of Belgrade Faculty of Philosophy and now lives in the Belgrade municipality of Čukarica. She was for many years the host of the television program VIP, in which she interviewed several of Serbia's most prominent political and cultural figures. She received a plaque from the city of Belgrade for the documentaries Tajne Beograda (1997) and Zlatni melos (1998). Predić has also written for media outlets such as Politika.

== Political career ==
Predić is a long-standing member of the SDPS and has been a spokesperson for the party. The party took part in the 2012 Serbian parliamentary election on the Democratic Party's Choice for a Better Life electoral list, on which Predić received the 170th position. The list won sixty-seven mandates, and she was not elected. The SDPS subsequently formed a new alliance with the Serbian Progressive Party and participated in a new coalition government after the election.

In 2012, Predić was appointed as state secretary in Serbia's ministry of culture and information. She announced new legislation on media concentration and transparency of ownership in January 2013. Later in the year, she said that the state had a "strategic commitment" to divest from ownership of the media.

The SDPS contested the 2016 Serbian parliamentary election on the Progressive Party's Aleksandar Vučić — Serbia Is Winning list. Predić received the ninety-ninth position on the list and was elected when it won a majority victory with 131 out of 250 mandates.

Her term in the legislature was brief. She resigned on 23 August 2016 after being appointed as state secretary in the ministry of education, science, and technological development. She did not receive the position as an SDPS representative but rather at the request of the minister, Mladen Šarčević, with whom she had previously collaborated in his private education system. She served until April 2017, when she was replaced by Marko Milenković, and returned to her career in media. Šarčević told Danas that he was dissatisfied with Predić's performance in office.

After leaving office, Predić said in an interview that Serbia did not have a coherent cultural policy.
