= Milan Ljubić =

Serbian politician

Milan Ljubić (Serbian Cyrillic: Милан Љубић; born 1978) is a politician in Serbia. He has served in the National Assembly of Serbia since 13 February 2019 as a member of the Serbian Progressive Party.

== Private career ==
Ljubić is a medical doctor based in Niš.

== Political career ==
Ljubić received the 148th position on the Progressive Party's Aleksandar Vučić — Serbia is Winning electoral list in the 2016 Serbian parliamentary election and was not initially elected when the list won a majority victory with 131 out of 250 seats. He was awarded a mandate on 13 February 2019 as a replacement for Ljibuška Lakatoš, who had resigned.
