= Nemanja Radojević =

Serbian politician

Member of the National Assembly
- In office 22 January 2019 – 3 August 2020
- Preceded by: Dušan Pavlović

Personal details
- Born: 1989 (age 36–37)
- Party: DJB (2014–2019); SMS (2019–present)

Nemanja Radojević (Serbian Cyrillic: Немања Радојевић; born 1989) is a politician in Serbia. He served in the National Assembly of Serbia from 2019 to 2020 as a member of the Party of Modern Serbia.

== Private career ==
Radojević has a bachelor's degree in Political Science, specializing in international relations. He lives in Kragujevac.

== Politician ==
Radojević first sought election to the National Assembly in the 2014 Serbian parliamentary election, in which he received the sixtieth position on DJB's electoral list. The list did not cross the electoral threshold to win representation in the assembly.

He received the sixteenth position on DJB's list in Kragujevac for the 2016 Serbian local elections; this list also did not cross the electoral threshold. For the concurrent 2016 Serbian parliamentary election, he was awarded the nineteenth position on the association's list. DJB won sixteen mandates, and Radojević did not initially serve in its assembly delegation. He was, however, awarded a mandate in January 2019 as a replacement for Dušan Pavlović, who had resigned.

After receiving his mandate, Radojević announced that he would not align himself with DJB in the assembly but instead join the Party of Modern Serbia and sit in a parliamentary group called the Free MPs club, consisting of former DJB members. He was a member of the parliamentary opposition.
