= Jelena Vujić Obradović =

Serbian politician

Jelena Vujić Obradović (Serbian Cyrillic: Јелена Вујић Обрадовић; born 1979), formerly known as Jelena Vujić, is a politician in Serbia. She has served in the National Assembly of Serbia since 2016 as a member of United Serbia (Jedinstvena Srbija, JS).

== Private career ==
Vujić Obradović is a graduate lawyer. She lives in Aleksandrovac.

== Political career ==
United Serbia has been aligned with the Socialist Party of Serbia in every parliamentary election since 2008. Vujić Obradović received the 109th position on the Socialist-led electoral list in the 2014 Serbian parliamentary election; the list won forty-four mandates, and she was not elected. She was promoted to the thirty-second position in the 2016 parliamentary election, in which the Socialist alliance won twenty-nine mandates. She was not initially elected but was awarded a mandate on 5 October 2016 as a replacement for Srđan Kružević, who had resigned.

Vujić Obradović is a deputy member of the assembly's foreign affairs committee; a deputy member of the committee on the judiciary, public administration, and local self-government; a deputy member of the committee on labour, social issues, social inclusion, and poverty reduction; and a member of the parliamentary friendship groups with Austria, Bulgaria, China, Cuba, Germany, Greece, India, Iraq, Italy, Luxembourg, Malta, Mexico, Russia, Spain, Switzerland, Tunisia, Turkey, and the United States of America. United Serbia provides outside support to the government of Serbia, and Vujić Obradović serves in the assembly as a supporter of the ministry.
