= Stanija Kompirović =

Serbian politician

Stanija Kompirović (Serbian Cyrillic: Станија Компировић; born 1968) is a politician in Serbia. She has served in the National Assembly of Serbia since 2016 as a member of the Serbian Progressive Party.

== Private life ==
Kompirović has a Bachelor of Laws degree and is based in Kosovska Mitrovica (North Mitrovica) in the disputed territory recognized in Serbia as Kosovo and Metohija.

== Parliamentarian ==
Kompirović received the seventy-second position on the Progressive Party's Aleksandar Vučić – Serbia Is Winning electoral list for the 2016 election and was elected when the list won a majority victory with 131 out of 250 mandates. She is currently a member of the parliamentary culture and information committee; a deputy member of the committee on the judiciary, public administration, and local self-government; and a member of the parliamentary friendship groups with Belarus, China, Greece, Kazakhstan, and Russia.
