= Aleksandra Majkić =

Serbian politician

Aleksandra Majkić (Serbian Cyrillic: Александра Мајкић; born 1979) is a politician in Serbia. She has served in the National Assembly of Serbia since 2016 as a member of the Serbian Progressive Party.

== Private career ==
Majkić is a graduate of the University of Novi Sad's Faculty of Law. She lives in Kikinda, Vojvodina.

== Political career ==
=== Municipal and provincial ===
Majkić received the fifteenth position on the Serbian Radical Party's electoral list in the 2008 Vojvodina provincial election, in which half the members were elected by proportional representation. The party won twenty seats by the proportional system, though Majkić does not appear to have served in the parliament that followed. She was, however, elected to the municipal assembly of Kikinda in the concurrent 2008 local elections.

The Radical Party experienced a significant split later in 2008, with several members joining the breakaway Serbian Progressive Party under the leadership of Tomislav Nikolić and Aleksandar Vučić. Majkić was among those who sided with the Progressives. She was re-elected to the municipal assembly under the new party's banner in the 2012 local elections and became president of the assembly on September 13, 2013. She was elected to a third term in the 2016 local elections, though she stood down as municipal assembly president on May 20, 2016, after being elected to the National Assembly.

=== Member of the National Assembly ===
Majkić received the 234th position out of 250 on the Progressive Party's Let's Get Serbia Moving list in the 2012 parliamentary election. This was too low a position for election to be a realistic prospect, and she was indeed not elected.

For the 2016 parliamentary election, she was given the 131st position on the Progressive Party's Aleksandar Vučić – Serbia Is Winning list; the list won a majority victory with 131 seats, and Majkić was elected. She is currently a member of the parliamentary committee on constitutional and legislature issues; a deputy member of two other committees; and a member of the parliamentary friendship groups with Australia, Belarus, Belgium, France, Georgia, Germany, Greece, Italy, Kazakhstan, Morocco, Spain, Switzerland, and the United Arab Emirates.
