= Marko Gavrilović =

Serbian politician

Marko Gavrilović (Serbian Cyrillic: Марко Гавриловић; born 1978) is a politician in Serbia. He served in the National Assembly of Serbia from 2016 to 2017 as a member of the Serbian Progressive Party.

== Private career ==
Gavrilović is an economist based in the Belgrade municipality of Obrenovac.

== Parliamentarian ==
Gavrilović received the 112th position on the Progressive Party's Aleksandar Vučić – Serbia Is Winning list in the 2016 Serbian parliamentary election and was elected when the list won a landslide victory with 131 out of 250 mandates. During his time in the assembly, he was a member of the committee on agriculture, forestry, and water management; a deputy member of two other committees; and a member of the parliamentary friendship groups for Australia, Austria, Belarus, Brazil, Finland, Germany, Japan, Kazakhstan, Russia, and Syria. He resigned from the assembly on October 11, 2017.
