= Vesna Ivković =

Serbian politician and doctor (born 1960)

Vesna Ivković (Serbian Cyrillic: Весна Ивковић; born 1960) is a medical doctor and a politician in Serbia. She has served in the National Assembly of Serbia since 2016 as a member of the Socialist Party of Serbia.

== Private career ==
Ivković is a medical doctor and labour medicine specialist in Smederevo. A 2013 article in Politika described her as the director of the city's health centre.

== Political career ==
Ivković received the 233rd position on the electoral list led by the Socialist Party for the 2012 Serbian parliamentary election. This was too low a position for election to be a reasonable prospect, and indeed she was not elected.

She received the thirtieth position on the Socialist-led list in the 2016 election and narrowly missed direct election when the list won twenty-nine mandates. Following the resignation of party leader Ivica Dačić to accept a cabinet position, however, she was awarded the vacant mandate and was able to take her seat on October 6, 2016. The Socialist Party is part of Serbia's coalition government, and Ivković serves with its parliamentary majority.

Ivković is a member of the parliamentary committee on human and minority rights and gender equality; a deputy member of the health and family committee; and a member of the parliamentary friendship groups for Belarus, Greece, Italy, Kazakhstan, Montenegro, Spain, and Switzerland.
