= Vesna Nikolić Vukajlović =

Serbian politician

- Весна Николић Вукајловић

Member of the National Assembly of the Republic of Serbia
- In office 3 June 2016 – 3 August 2020
- In office 14 February 2007 – 11 June 2008

Mayor of Kraljevo (acting)
- In office 27 February 2009 – 19 March 2009
- Preceded by: Miloš Babić
- Succeeded by: Ljubiša Simović

Personal details
- Born: 3 September 1962 (age 63) Aleksandrovac, PR Serbia, FPR Yugoslavia
- Party: SRS

Vesna Nikolić Vukajlović (Serbian Cyrillic: Весна Николић Вукајловић; born 3 September 1962) is a Serbian politician. She has served two terms in the Serbian parliament, was the deputy mayor of Kraljevo from 2008 to 2009, and briefly served as the city's acting mayor. Nikolić Vukajlović is a member of the far-right Serbian Radical Party (SRS).

== Early life and career ==
Nikolić Vukajlović was born in Aleksandrovac, in what was then the People's Republic of Serbia in the Federal People's Republic of Yugoslavia. She has a Bachelor of Laws degree and became the owner of the private family company Bim promet in 1999.

== Politician ==
The Radical Party's local Kraljevo board became divided in late 2006, due to a conflict between city board president Miljko Četrović and Raška District chair Vjerica Radeta. Četrović accused Radeta of improper interference in the city board's affairs. After the central party organization sided with Radeta, he resigned as his position and started a new group in the local assembly called the "Free Radicals." Radeta then appointed Nikolić Vukajlović as the city board's acting president, notwithstanding that some in the party protested the appointment as illegal.

=== First parliamentary term ===
Nikolić Vukajlović appeared in the 224th position (out of 250) on the Radical Party's electoral list in the 2007 Serbian parliamentary election. The list won eighty-one seats, and she was included afterward in the SRS assembly delegation. (From 2000 to 2011, Serbian parliamentary mandates were awarded to sponsoring parties or coalitions rather than to individual candidates, and it was common practice for the mandates to be assigned out of numerical order. Nikolić Vukajlović's low position on the list did not prevent her election.) Although the Radicals won more seats than any other party in this election, they fell short of a majority and ultimately served in opposition. In her first parliamentary term, Nikolić Vukajlović was a member of the administrative committee and the committee for trade and tourism.

=== Deputy mayor ===
Nikolić Vukajlović appeared in the sixtieth position on the Radical Party's list in the 2008 parliamentary election. The list won seventy-eight seats, and she was not on this occasion chosen for a mandate. The overall result of the election was inconclusive, and the Radicals initially held talks with the Socialist Party of Serbia (SPS) and the Democratic Party of Serbia (DSS) on the formation of a new government. These talks were unsuccessful, and the Socialists instead joined a coalition with the For a European Serbia (ZES) alliance led by the Democratic Party (DS).

The Radicals also won eighteen seats out of seventy in Kraljevo in the concurrent 2008 Serbian local elections, finishing second against the ZES alliance, and Nikolić Vukajlović took a seat in the city assembly. As with the parliamentary election, the local vote in Kraljevo did not produce a clear winner; notwithstanding events at the republic level, the SRS, DSS, and SPS were able to form a local administration in Kraljevo. Incumbent mayor Miloš Babić of New Serbia (NS), a smaller party aligned with the DSS, was confirmed for a new term in office on 16 June 2008, and Nikolić Vukajlović was chosen as deputy mayor. Immediately after her appointment, she ordered a costly renovation of the deputy mayor's office, reportedly disregarding the city's legal framework for small purchases.

The SRS experienced a serious split at the republic level in late 2008, with several leading members joining the more moderate Serbian Progressive Party (SNS) under the leadership of Tomislav Nikolić and Aleksandar Vučić. Nikolić Vukajlović remained with the Radicals.

Her term as deputy mayor was brief. The SPS withdrew from the governing coalition before the end of 2008, leading to a situation where the administration could not depend on a majority of votes in the assembly. On 27 February 2009, Miloš Babić died. Nikolić Vukajlović served as acting mayor until 19 March 2009, when a coalition of ZES, the SPS, and the local Movement for Kraljevo came to power with Ljubiša Simović of the Democratic Party as the city's new mayor. The morning after the change in government, Nikolić Vukajlović broke into the city assembly building and "started throwing papers and things around," yelling, "No one will kick me out of here [...] you will see what will happen, no one can drive me away from here." She was ultimately removed from the building by the police. (Nikolić Vukajlović alleged that Movement for Kraljevo leader Ljubiša Jovanović physically assaulted her during these events. He responded that she had yelled at him and started toward him, that she lost her balance after taking a step back, and that his only physical interaction with her was to grab her arm and help her back to her feet.)

Nikolić Vukajlović had been required to resign her seat in the city assembly on the occasion of her election as deputy mayor. She reclaimed her assembly mandate on 19 June 2009.

=== Rival administrations in Kraljevo ===
The new administration in Kraljevo proved as unstable as its predecessor, and the Movement for Kraljevo soon ended its alliance with ZES and the SPS. In April 2010, the Radicals, DSS, and Movement for Kraljevo temporarily attained a majority of seats in the city assembly under extremely contentious circumstances and elected Ljubiša Jovašević as mayor. (Notwithstanding their previous interaction, Nikolić Vukajlović was by this time a supporter of Jovašević's candidacy.) The ZES–SPS alliance did not accept the legitimacy of Jovašević's election, resulting in a chaotic situation in which two rival administrations, backed by two rival assemblies, claimed to be the legitimate government of the city. On 24 April 2010, the SRS–DSS–Movement for Kraljevo assembly appointed Nikolić Vukajlović as director of the public company Toplana; by virtue of holding this position, she was once again required to resign her seat in the assembly.

The confusion and instability of the situation was soon compounded by another split in local ranks of the Radical Party. In June 2010, the local SRS board voted to expel Nikolić Vukajlović (despite the fact that she was still a prominent member of the central party organization) on the charge that she had "loaned" two Radical delegates to the ZES–SPS assembly for the purposes of quorum. The SRS–DSS–Movement for Kraljevo assembly also removed Nikolić Vukajlović as director of Toplana on 22 June 2010.

The ZES–SPS alliance ultimately regained control of the local government on 7 July 2010, and Simonović was restored as the city's legitimate mayor. On 16 July 2010, the city assembly annulled both Nikolić Vukajlović's appointment as director of Toplana and her subsequent dismissal.

Nikolić Vukajlović was not a candidate in the 2012 Serbian parliamentary election or the 2012 Serbian local elections.

=== Return to parliament ===
Serbia's electoral system was reformed in 2011, such that all parliamentary mandates were awarded to candidates on successful lists in numerical order. Nikolić Vukajlović received the fifteenth position on the Radical Party's list in the 2016 parliamentary election and was elected to a second parliamentary term when the list won twenty-two mandates. The Serbian Progressive Party and its allies won a majority victory, and the Radicals served afterward in opposition. In the 2016–20 parliament, Nikolić Vukajlović was a member of committee on constitutional and legislative issues and the labour committee, (Note: Formally known as the Committee on Labour, Social Affairs, Social Inclusion, and Poverty Reduction.) as well as the parliamentary friendship groups with Belarus, Greece, Kazakhstan, Spain, and Venezuela.

By this time, Nikolić Vukajlović was once again the leader of the Radical Party's city board in Kraljevo. She led the party's electoral list in the 2016 Serbian local elections, which were held concurrently with the parliamentary vote, and was re-elected to the city assembly when the list won five seats. The Progressives and their allies fell one seat short of a majority with thirty-four out of seventy seats; on 29 June 2016, Predrag Terzić of the SNS was chosen as mayor with support from the Progressives, the Socialists, and the Radicals.

In the aftermath of the 2017 Serbian presidential election, in which Radical Party leader Vojislav Šešelj fared poorly, Nikolić Vukajlović was said to have been critical of the party's central campaign overseen by Vjerica Radeta.

=== Since 2020 ===
Nikolić Vukajlović was promoted to the tenth position on the SRS list in the 2020 Serbian parliamentary election. The list fell below the electoral threshold, and she lost her parliamentary seat. She also led the SRS list for Kraljevo in the concurrent 2020 Serbian local elections; the party fell below the threshold at this level as well.

She appeared in the eighth position on the Radical Party's list in the 2022 parliamentary election and the twelfth position in the 2023 parliamentary election. The party once again fell below the electoral threshold on both occasions. She was described as living in Belgrade on the 2022 list and appeared under the name "Vesna Nikolić" in 2023.

Nikolić Vukajlović was the vice-president of the SRS executive board during the 2022 parliamentary election. During the campaign, she reiterated the Radical Party's position that Serbia should turn toward Russia rather than the European Union and also highlighted the party's opposition to same-sex marriage.
