= Svetlana Nikolić Pavlović =

Serbian doctor and politician

Svetlana Nikolić Pavlović (Serbian Cyrillic: Светлана Николић Павловић; born 1955) is a medical doctor and politician in Serbia. She has served in the National Assembly of Serbia since 2016 as a member of the Serbian Progressive Party.

== Private career ==
Nikolić Pavlović is a cardiologist based in Ćuprija. She has an administrative position at the municipality's general hospital.

== Political career ==
Nikolić Pavlović received the 177th position on the Progressive Party's Aleksandar Vučić — Future We Believe In electoral list in the 2014 Serbian parliamentary election. The list won a landslide victory with 158 out of 250 mandates; Nikolić Pavlović was not elected and was unable to enter the assembly as a replacement member before new elections were called.

She was promoted to the seventy-eighth position the successor Aleksandar Vučić – Serbia Is Winning list in the 2016 election and was elected when the list won a second consecutive majority with 131 seats. She is a member of the assembly's health and family committee; a deputy member of the environmental protection committee and the committee on labour, social issues, social inclusion, and poverty reduction; and a member of the parliamentary friendship groups with Azerbaijan, Denmark, Finland, Norway, Russia, Slovenia, Sweden, and Switzerland.
