= Aleksandra Belačić =

Serbian politician

Aleksandra Belačić (Serbian Cyrillic: Александра Белачић; born 1986) is a politician in Serbia. She has served in the National Assembly of Serbia since 2016 as a member of the far-right Serbian Radical Party.

== Early life and career ==
Belačić is from the New Belgrade area of the city of Belgrade. She studied economics at university and was a scriptwriter for a telenovela program in Mexico.

== Political career ==
Belačić was elected to the National Assembly in the 2016 Serbian parliamentary election; she received the eighteenth position on the Radical Party list and was declared elected when the list won twenty-two mandates. She is currently a member of the parliamentary opposition. In August 2016, she announced that the Radical Party would support Donald Trump's bid to become president of the United States of America, citing Trump's stated desire for better relations with Russia and his offer of an apology for the bombing of Belgrade during the 1999 NATO bombing of Yugoslavia.

She is currently a member of the assembly's culture and information committee, a member of Serbia's delegation to parliamentary assembly of the Organization of the Black Sea Economic Cooperation, and a member of the parliamentary friendship groups for Kazakhstan and Romania.
