= Grozdana Banac =

Serbian politician

Grozdana Banac (Serbian Cyrillic: Гроздана Банац; born 9 July 1951) is a Serbian politician and former lawyer. She has served two terms in the National Assembly of Serbia as a member of the Party of United Pensioners of Serbia (PUPS).

== Career ==
=== Municipal politics ===
Banac has led the PUPS board in the Belgrade municipality of Voždovac.

The PUPS joined the Socialist Party of Serbia's electoral alliance prior to the 2008 Serbian local elections. Banac was included on the Socialist-led electoral list for the Voždovac municipal assembly in both that election and the special 2009 election in Voždovac, although she was not selected for a mandate on either occasion when the assembly convened.

From 2000 to 2011, mandates in Serbian elections were awarded to successful parties or coalitions rather than individual candidates, and it was common practice for the mandates to be awarded out of numerical order. The Socialist list won three mandates in 2008 and six in 2009.

Serbia's electoral system was reformed in 2011, such that mandates were awarded to candidates on successful lists in numerical order. Banac was given the second position on the Socialist list for Voždovac in the 2013 municipal election and was this time elected when the list won five mandates. She also appeared in the forty-second position on the Socialist list for the 2014 Belgrade City Assembly election and was not elected when the list won sixteen mandates.

The PUPS subsequently shifted its alliance from the Socialists to the Serbian Progressive Party, and Banac appeared in the twenty-seventh position on the Progressive list for Voždovac in the 2016 local elections. She was not directly re-elected when the list won twenty-six mandates.

=== Parliamentarian ===
Banac received the seventy-eighth position on the Socialist list in the 2012 Serbian parliamentary election. The list received forty-four mandates, and she was not elected. She was promoted to the forty-sixth position for the 2014 election and was not initially elected when the list, once again, won forty-four seats. She received a mandate on 10 May 2014 as a replacement for party leader Jovan Krkobabić, who had died on 22 April. The PUPS provided outside support to Aleksandar Vučić's administration in the parliament that followed, and Banac served as part of the administration's parliamentary majority.

The PUPS contested the 2016 parliamentary election on the Progressive Party's Aleksandar Vučić – Serbia Is Winning list, and Banac received the 234th position out of 250. This was too low a position for direct election to be a realistic possibility, and indeed she was not re-elected when the list won a majority victory with 131 mandates. She was able to re-enter the assembly on 28 August 2017 as a replacement for Miroljub Stanković, who had died on 25 August. Banac again served with the administration's parliamentary majority.

She again received the 234th position on the Progressive Party's Aleksandar Vučić — For Our Children list in the 2020 parliamentary election. The list won a landslide majority with 188 mandates. Not initially re-elected, Banac may be able to re-enter parliament in its current term as the replacement for another PUPS member.

== Personal life ==
She currently resides in Belgrade.
