= Desanka Repac =

Serbian politician

Desanka Repac (Serbian Cyrillic: Десанка Репац; born 1949) is a politician in Serbia. She served in the National Assembly of Serbia from 2016 to 2020 as a member of the Serbian Progressive Party.

== Private career ==
Repac is a dentist. She lives in Subotica in the province of Vojvodina.

== Politician ==
=== Municipal politics ===
Repac received the third position on the Progressive Party's electoral list for the 2012 local elections in Subotica and was elected when the list won eight mandates. She served in the city assembly for the term that followed and did not seek re-election at the local level in 2016.

=== Parliamentarian ===
Repac was given the 222nd position (out of 250) on the Progressive Party's Let's Get Serbia Moving list in the 2012 Serbian parliamentary election, which was held concurrently with the local elections. This was too low a position for election to be a realistic prospect, and indeed she was not elected when the list won seventy-three mandates.

She was promoted to the 126th position on the successorAleksandar Vučić – Serbia Is Winning list in the 2016 Serbian parliamentary election and was on this occasion elected when the list won a majority victory with 131 mandates. In the assembly term that followed, she was a member of the health and family committee; a deputy member of the environmental protection committee and the committee on labour, social issues, social inclusion, and poverty reduction; and a member of the parliamentary friendship groups with Albania, Belarus, Georgia, Japan, Kazakhstan, Russia, and the United States of America.

Repac was included in the 227th position on the Progressive Party's Aleksandar Vučić — For Our Children list in the 2020 parliamentary election. This was once again too low for election to be feasible, and she was not re-elected even as the list won a landslide majority with 188 out of 250 mandates. It is possible, though unlikely, that she could re-enter parliament as the replacement for another Progressive Party member in the term of the current assembly.
