= Nevenka Kostadinova =

Serbian politician

Nevenka Kostadinova (Serbian Cyrillic: Невенка Костадинова; born 1972) is a politician in Serbia from the country's Bulgarian community. She has served in the National Assembly of Serbia since October 2019 as a member of the Serbian Progressive Party.

== Private career ==
Kostadinova has a bachelor's degree in chemistry. She lives in Bosilegrad, a predominantly Bulgarian community in Serbia's southeastern corner.

== Politician ==
=== Municipal politics and the Bulgarian National Council ===
Kostadinova was elected to the Bosilegrad municipal assembly in the 2012 Serbian local elections at the head of a combined electoral list of the United Regions of Serbia (URS) and Party of United Pensioners of Serbia (PUPS). This list won four mandates, and she subsequently led the alliance's group in the local assembly. She also received the 116th position on the URS list in the 2012 Serbian parliamentary election; the list won sixteen mandates, and she was not elected.

The URS ceased to exist after the 2014 Serbian parliamentary election, and Kostadinova joined the Progressive Party. She was re-elected to the Bosilegrad assembly at the head of the party's list in the 2016 Serbian local elections. The Progressives won ten mandates, emerging as the only opposition in the assembly to an independent group led by mayor Vladimir Zahariev.

Kostadinova was also elected to Serbia's Bulgarian National Council in 2014 on an electoral list headed by Zahariev. This notwithstanding, she emerged as a prominent local opponent of Zahariev after the 2016 municipal election, charging him with responsibility for the withdrawal of proposed investment in the municipality by the Bulgarian company Kalinel. She received the third position on a rival list led by Stefan Kostov in the 2018 national council election and narrowly missed re-election when the list won only two mandates.

Zahariev subsequently aligned himself with the Progressive Party. Kostadinova was not a candidate for re-election at the local level in 2020.

=== Parliamentarian ===
Kostadinova was awarded the 150th position on the Progressive Party's Aleksandar Vučić – Serbia Is Winning list in the 2016 parliamentary election and was not initially elected when the list won a majority victory with 131 seats. Following the departure of other elected members further up the list, she was awarded a mandate on 7 October 2019.

She received the 131st position on the Progressive Party's Aleksandar Vučić — For Our Children list in the 2020 Serbian parliamentary election and was elected to a second term when the list won a landslide majority with 188 mandates. She is now a member of the environmental protection committee; a deputy member of the committee on the economy, regional development, trade, tourism, and energy; a deputy member of the committee on spatial planning, transport, infrastructure, and telecommunications; a member of Serbia's delegation to the South-East European Cooperation Process parliamentary assembly; and a member of the parliamentary friendship groups with Bosnia and Herzegovina, Bulgaria, China, Israel, Japan, Jordan, North Macedonia, Russia, Turkey, and Ukraine.
