= Radoslav Cokić =

Serbian politician (born 1958)

Radoslav Cokić (Serbian Cyrillic: Радослав Цокић; born 1958) is a politician in Serbia. He has been a member of the National Assembly of Serbia since 2016, serving as a member of the Serbian Progressive Party. Previously, he was the mayor of Smederevska Palanka from 2004 to 2008 and governor of the Podunavlje District from 2014 to 2016.

== Early life and career ==
Cokić is a wood processing engineer in private life. He has also pursued a side project as a singer.

== Political career ==
=== Mayor ===
Cokić was elected as mayor of Smederevska Palanka in 2004 as a member of the Serbian Renewal Movement. In 2007, he fended off an attempt by the Democratic Party of Serbia, the Serbian Radical Party, and the Democratic Party to force his recall. He fielded his own electoral list in 2008, but it did not cross the electoral threshold to win representation in the assembly. This notwithstanding, he was described in 2011 as leading an opposition group called "Together."

Cokić introduced a monthly series of spiritual public forums in 2005, with the intent of enhancing the social role of Orthodox religious culture.

=== Governor ===
Cokić was appointed as governor of the Podunavlje District on February 14, 2014. This area was badly affected by the 2014 Southeast Europe floods, and Cokić made an urgent appeal during this time for drinking water to be imported to the area. He resigned in July 2016, following his election to the Serbian assembly.

=== Legislator ===
Cokić received the seventy-seventh position on the Progressive Party's Aleksandar Vučić – Serbia Is Winning electoral list in the 2016 Serbian parliamentary election and was elected when the list won a majority with 131 out of 250 mandates. He is a member of the parliamentary environmental protection committee; a deputy member of two other committees; and a member of the parliamentary friendship groups for Austria, Belarus, Germany, Italy, Kazakhstan, Norway, and Slovenia.
