= Živko Vrcelj =

Serbian doctor and politician

Živko Vrcelj (Serbian Cyrillic: Живко Врцељ; born 19 July 1959) is a medical doctor and politician in Serbia. He was a member of the Assembly of Vojvodina from 2012 to 2016 and briefly served in the National Assembly of Serbia in 2016 as a member of the Serbian Progressive Party. Vrcelj is currently the director of the Sremska Mitrovica General Hospital.

== Early life and career ==
Vrcelj was raised in Ogulin in what was then the Socialist Republic of Croatia in the Socialist Federal Republic of Yugoslavia. He graduated from the University of Zagreb School of Medicine in 1983 and subsequently worked as a surgeon in Zagreb and Ogulin until the outbreak of the Yugoslav Wars. From 1991 to 1995, he was a war surgeon in the Republika Srpska Krajina. He has worked in Sremska Mitrovica since 1996 and became head of the surgical department of medicine at the Sremska Mitrovica General Hospital in 2013.

== Political career ==
Vrcelj was elected to the Assembly of Vojvodina for Sremska Mitrovica's constituency seat in the 2012 provincial election as a candidate of the Progressive Party's Let's Get Vojvodina Moving coalition. The election was won by the Democratic Party and its allies, and Vrcelj served in opposition for the next four years. He was subsequently awarded the ninety-fourth position on the Progressive Party's Aleksandar Vučić — Future We Believe In electoral list in the 2016 Serbian parliamentary election and was elected when the list won a majority victory with 131 out of 250 mandates.

His term in the National Assembly was brief. He resigned on 12 August 2016, after being appointed to a six-month term as acting director of the Sremska Mitrovica General Hospital by the government of Vojvodina. In January 2017, he was confirmed in the role for a four-year term.

Vrcelj was also elected to the Sremska Mitrovica municipal assembly in the 2016 local elections but resigned in September 2016 following his appointment as hospital director.

== Electoral record ==
=== Provincial ===
2012 Vojvodina assembly election Sremska Mitrovica (constituency seat) - First and Second Rounds
Živko Vrcelj	Let's Get Vojvodina Moving (Affiliation: Serbian Progressive Party)	11,456	26.28	21,110	58.98
Goran Ivić (incumbent)	Choice for a Better Vojvodina	8,376	19.22	15,299	42.02
Branislav Andrijević	Citizens' Group – For Better Life in Sremska Mitrovica	7,243	16.62		
Ilija Milinović	Socialist Party of Serbia–Party of United Pensioners of Serbia–United Serbia–Social Democratic Party of Serbia	4,296	9.86		
Mitar Pavlović	Democratic Party of Serbia	4,039	9.27		
Miroslav Pevac	League of Social Democrats of Vojvodina	2,776	6.37		
Dragan Banovački	Serbian Radical Party	2,197	5.04		
Milenko Perić	Preokret	1,642	3.77		
Momir Đuričić	Dr. Boško Laćarac–United Regions of Serbia–Laćaračka inicijativa–Za jaku Mitrovicu	1,564	3.59		
Total valid votes		43,589	100	36,409	100
