= Ana Karadžić =

Serbian politician (born 1988)

Ana Karadžić (Serbian Cyrillic: Ана Караџић; born 15 September 1988), formerly known as Ana Ćirić (Serbian Cyrillic: Ана Ћирић), is a politician in Serbia. She has served in the National Assembly of Serbia since 2016 as a member of the Movement of Socialists.

== Early life and career ==
Karadžić lives in Belgrade and has a Bachelor of Engineering degree in organizational sciences.

== Politician ==
=== Municipal politics ===
Karadžic was appointed to the municipal council of Voždovac on 31 January 2014, with responsibility for ecology. She served in this role until her election to the national assembly in 2016.

=== Member of the National Assembly ===
The Movement of Socialists contested the 2016 Serbian parliamentary election as part of the Serbian Progressive Party's Aleksandar Vučić – Serbia Is Winning electoral list. Karadžić received the ninety-second position on the list and was elected when the coalition won a majority with 131 out of 250 mandates. Along with other Movement of Socialists parliamentarians, she served in a parliamentary group with the People's Peasant Party and the United Peasant Party. During the 2016–20 parliament, Karadžić was a member of the committee for the rights of the child; a deputy member of the culture and information committee, the European integration committee, and the agriculture, forestry, and water management committee; the head of the parliamentary friendship group with Mexico; and a member of the parliamentary friendship groups with Cuba, Finland, Greece, Indonesia, Russia, South Korea, Spain, and Venezuela. The Movement of Socialists is part of Serbia's current coalition government led by the Progressive Party and Karadžić serves as part of its parliamentary majority.

In October 2016, Karadžić attended a conference of the governing Syriza party in Greece at the invitation of Greek prime minister Alexis Tsipras.

She once again received the ninety-second position on the Progressive Party's list, known on this occasion by the name Aleksandar Vučić — For Our Children, in the 2020 election. She was elected to a second term when the list won a landslide majority with 188 mandates. She is now a member of the foreign affairs committee; a deputy member of the committee on constitutional and legislative issues and the committee on the economy, regional development, trade, tourism, and energy; and a deputy member of Serbia's delegation to the Parliamentary Assembly of the Organization for Security and Co-operation in Europe (OSCE PA). She continues to lead the parliamentary friendship group with Mexico and is a member of the friendship groups with Algeria, Angola, Argentina, Armenia, Australia, Azerbaijan, Belarus, Bhutan, Brazil, Burundi, Cambodia, Canada, Chile, China, Cuba, the Czech Republic, the Democratic Republic of the Congo, Djibouti, Egypt, Ethiopia, Fiji, France, Georgia, Germany, Ghana, Greece, the Holy See, India, Indonesia, Israel, Iraq, Iran, Italy, Japan, Jordan, Kazakhstan, Kenya, Kuwait, Lesotho, Malawi, Moldova, Montenegro, Morocco, Myanmar, Namibia, Nepal, North Korea, North Macedonia, Norway, Oman, the Philippines, Portugal, Qatar, Russia, Rwanda, Saudi Arabia, Sierra Leone, South Africa, the Sovereign Order of Malta, Spain, the countries of Sub-Saharan Africa, Sweden, Switzerland, Syria, Tajikistan, Tunisia, Turkey, Turkmenistan, Uganda, Ukraine, the United Arab Emirates, the United Kingdom, the United States of America, Venezuela, Vietnam, Zambia, and Zimbabwe.
