= Blaža Knežević =

Serbian politician

Blaža Knežević (Serbian Cyrillic: Блажа Кнежевић; born 1968) is a politician in Serbia. He has served in the National Assembly of Serbia since 2016 as a member of the Serbian Progressive Party.

== Early life and career ==
Knežević was born in Šabac, then part of the Socialist Republic of Serbia in the Socialist Federal Republic of Yugoslavia. He is an economist by training.

== Political career ==
Knežević began his political career at the municipal level, serving at one time as leader of the Progressive group on the Šabac municipal council. In 2015, he urged that the council meet with a village representative from Mrđenovac who was conducting a hunger strike in protest against a decision to call new local elections.

Knežević received the ninety-first position on the Progressive Party's Aleksandar Vučić – Serbia Is Winning electoral list in the 2016 parliamentary election and was elected when the list won 131 mandates. He is currently a member of the parliamentary committee on the diaspora and Serbs in the region and a member of the parliamentary friendship groups for Azerbaijan, Belarus, China, the Czech Republic, Denmark, Germany, Greece, Japan, Kazakhstan, Montenegro, North Macedonia, Norway, Russia, and Slovenia.
