= Marko Zeljug =

Serbian politician

Marko Zeljug (Serbian Cyrillic: Марко Зељуг; born 1983) is a politician in Serbia. He has served in the National Assembly of Serbia since 2016 as a member of the Serbian Progressive Party.

== Private career ==
Zeljug is a veterinarian. He lives in Jakovo, in the Belgrade municipality of Surčin.

== Politician ==
=== City of Belgrade ===
Zeljug entered political life as a member of the far-right Serbian Radical Party; he received the fortieth position on the party's electoral list for the Assembly of the City of Belgrade in the 2008 Serbian local elections and was awarded a mandate when the list won forty seats. (Between 2000 and 2011, mandates in Serbian elections were awarded at the discretion of successful parties or coalitions, and it was common practice for the mandates to be awarded out of numerical order. Zeljug's list position had no direct bearing on his election.) The overall results of this election were initially inconclusive, but the Radicals ultimately served in opposition. The party experienced a major split later in the year, with several members joining the more moderate Progressive Party under the leadership of Tomislav Nikolić and Aleksandar Vučić. Zeljug was among those who sided with the Progressives.

Serbia's electoral laws were reformed in 2011, such that mandates were awarded in numerical order to candidates on successful lists. Zeljug received the thirty-eighth position on the Progressive Party's list in the 2012 Belgrade election. and narrowly missed direct re-election when the list won thirty-seven seats. He received a mandate on 13 June 2012 as the replacement for another member. The election was won by the Democratic Party and its allies, and Zeljug continued to serve in opposition.

The Democrats lost their majority in the Belgrade city assembly in late 2013, and a new city election was held in early 2014. The Progressives and their allies won a majority victory with sixty-three out of 110 mandates. Zeljug was not a candidate, but he was afterwards appointed as a member of the city council (i.e., the executive branch of the municipal government). He resigned from this position following his election to the national assembly in 2016.

=== Parliamentarian ===
Zeljug received the eighty-eighth position on the Progressive Party's Aleksandar Vučić — Future We Believe In list in the 2016 Serbian parliamentary election and was elected when the list won a majority victory with 131 out of 250 mandates. During the 2016–20 parliament, he served as a member of the assembly committee on administrative, budgetary, mandate, and immunity issues; a deputy member of the health and family committee and the agriculture, forestry, and water management committee; and a member of the parliamentary friendship groups with Austria, Belarus, Canada, China, Denmark, Germany, Japan, Russia, Slovenia, Switzerland, and the United Kingdom.

He was given the 141st position on the party's Aleksandar Vučić — For Our Children list in the 2020 Serbian parliamentary election and was elected to a second term in the assembly when the list won a landslide majority with 188 mandates. He is now a member of the agriculture committee, a deputy member of the environmental protection committee, the head of Serbia's parliamentary friendship group with Poland, and a member of the parliamentary friendship groups with China, Germany, Japan, Russia, the United Arab Emirates, the United Kingdom, and the United States of America.
