= Marko Parezanović =

Serbian politician

Marko Parezanović (Serbian Cyrillic: Марко Парезановић; born 23 June 1986) is a politician in Serbia. He has served in the National Assembly of Serbia since 2016 as a member of the Serbian Progressive Party.

== Private career ==
Parezanović is a graduate of the University of Kragujevac Faculty of Technical Sciences. He lives in Čačak and is a professor of technology and computer science.

== Politician ==
Parezanović was a founding member of the Progressive Party in 2008 and has been a prominent party official in Čačak. He received the sixty-eighth position on the party's Aleksandar Vučić – Serbia Is Winning electoral list in the 2016 parliamentary election and was elected when the list won a majority victory with 131 out of 250 mandates. During the 2016–20 parliament, he was a member of the committee on education, science, technological development, and the information society; a member of the committee on the judiciary, public administration, and local self-government; a deputy member of Serbia's delegation to the South-East European Cooperation Process Parliamentary Assembly; the head of Serbia's parliamentary friendship group with Belgium; and a member of the parliamentary friendship groups with Argentina, Azerbaijan, Belarus, Brazil, China, the Czech Republic, France, Germany, Ghana, Greece, Indonesia, Ireland, Italy, Kazakhstan, North Macedonia, Spain, Switzerland, the United Kingdom, and the United States of America.

In July 2019, a court in Čačak ordered Parezanović to pay one hundred thousand dinars to Dveri leader Boško Obradović for injuring his reputation. Parezanović had accused Obradović of money laundering in the 2017 Serbian presidential election; the court rejected this accusation as "unfounded."

He received the 102nd position on the Progressive Party's Aleksandar Vučić — For Our Children list in the 2020 election and was elected to a second term when the list won a landslide majority with 188 mandates. He is now a member of the environmental protection committee and the subcommittee on youth and sports, and a deputy member of the defence and internal affairs committee, the European Union–Serbia stabilization and association committee, and the committee on education, science, technological development, and the information society. He continues to chair Serbia's parliamentary friendship group with Belgium and is a member of the friendship groups with Azerbaijan, China, Cyprus, Germany, Greece, Israel, Japan, the Netherlands, Norway, Slovenia, Spain, Switzerland, Turkey, and the United States of America.

In November 2020, the Basic Court in Čačak ruled that Parezanović was required to pay one hundred thousand dinars to Dragan Đilas for damages to the latter's reputation. This pertained to comments Parezanović made in 2018, that Đilas had attempted to pay two members of the Čačak city assembly not to attend its sessions.
