= Srbislav Filipović =

Serbian politician

Srbislav Filipović (Serbian Cyrillic: Србислав Филиповић; born 1984) is a politician in Serbia. He has served in the National Assembly of Serbia since 2016 as a member of the Serbian Progressive Party.

== Early life and career ==
Filipović is a graduate economist and was a student union leader in 2009. He lives in Belgrade.

== Political career ==
=== City of Belgrade ===
Filipović sought election to the municipal assembly of Stari Grad, Belgrade in the 2004 Serbian local elections, receiving in the twenty-second position on the electoral list of G17 Plus. The list won five seats, and he was not selected for a mandate.

Filipović received the one hundredth position (out of 110) on the Progressive Party's list for the Assembly of the City of Belgrade in the 2012 local elections. The list won thirty-seven mandates, and he was not elected. He was promoted to the seventieth position on the party's list for the 2014 city election. On this occasion, the list won a majority victory with sixty-three seats. Filipović was not initially included in his party's delegation but received a mandate on 24 April 2014 following the resignation of other members further up the list. He did not seek re-election in 2018.

=== Parliamentarian ===
Filipović received the ninety-fifth position on the Progressive Party's Aleksandar Vučić – Serbia Is Winning electoral list in the 2016 Serbian parliamentary election and was elected when the list won 131 out of 250 mandates. The Progressive Party retained its status as the largest party in Serbia's coalition government after the election, and Filipović serves as part of its parliamentary majority. During the 2016–20 parliament, he was a member of the committee on constitutional and legislative issues and the committee on finance, state budget, and control of public spending; a deputy member of the culture and information committee and the committee on the judiciary, public administration, and local self-government; the head of the parliamentary friendship group with Croatia; and a member of the parliamentary friendship groups with Albania, Algeria, Belarus, China, Germany, Ghana, Kazakhstan, Montenegro, Myanmar, Namibia, Russia, Spain, the United Kingdom, and the United States of America.

He received the 114th position on the Progressive Party's Aleksandar Vučić — For Our Children coalition list in the 2020 Serbian parliamentary election and was elected to a second term when the list won a landslide majority with 188 mandates. He is now a member of the defence and internal affairs committee and the committee on Kosovo-Metohija, a deputy member of the committee on constitutional and legislative issues, a member of Serbia's delegation to the South-East European Cooperation Process Parliamentary Assembly, the head of Serbia's parliamentary friendship group with Albania, and a member of the friendship groups with the Bahamas, Bosnia and Herzegovina, Botswana, Cameroon, the Central African Republic, Comoros, Croatia, the Dominican Republic, Ecuador, Equatorial Guinea, Eritrea, Grenada, Guinea-Bissau, Jamaica, Kyrgyzstan, Laos, Liberia, Madagascar, Mali, Mauritius, Montenegro, Mozambique, Nauru, Nicaragua, Nigeria, Palau, Papua New Guinea, Paraguay, the Republic of Congo, Saint Vincent and the Grenadines, Sao Tome and Principe, the Solomon Islands, South Sudan, Sri Lanka, Sudan, Suriname, Togo, Trinidad and Tobago, Uruguay, and Uzbekistan.

During a parliamentary speech in December 2020, Filipović accused Dragan Đilas of wanting to bring about the assassination of Aleksandar Vučić.
