= Studenka Kovačević =

Serbian politician

Studenka Kovačević (Serbian Cyrillic: Студенка Ковачевић; born 1982) is a politician in Serbia. She has served in the National Assembly of Serbia since 2016 as a member of the Serbian Progressive Party.

== Early life and career ==
Kovačević is a graduate engineer in management residing in Bor. She is the director of the Bor Tourist Center.

== Parliamentarian ==
Kovačević received the 135th position on the Progressive Party's Aleksandar Vučić – Serbia Is Winning electoral list in the 2016 Serbian parliamentary election and narrowly missed direct election when the list won 131 out of 250 mandates. She was awarded a mandate on October 5, 2016, following the resignation of other candidates further up the list. She is a member of the parliamentary committee on the economy, regional development, trade, tourism, and energy and a member of the parliamentary friendship groups with Azerbaijan, Belarus, Belgium, China, Finland, France, Germany, Italy, Japan, Kazakhstan, the Netherlands, Russia, Spain, Switzerland, Turkey, the United Arab Emirates, and the United States of America.
