= Ljiljana Habjanović Đurović =

Serbian writer (born 1953)

- Љиљана Хабјановић Ђуровић
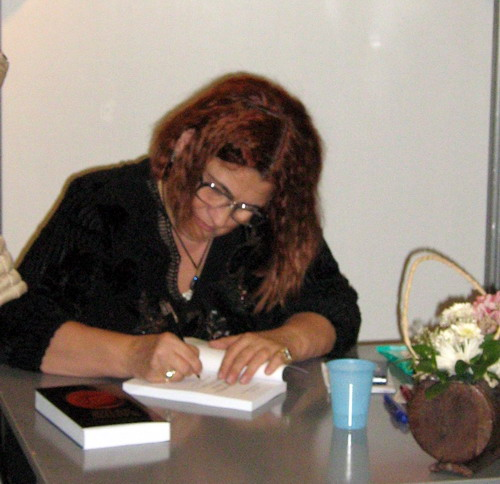
- Ljiljana Habjanović-Đurović at the book fair in Belgrade on 22 October 2007

Member of the National Assembly of the Republic of Serbia
- In office 3 June 2016 – 3 June 2016

Personal details
- Born: 6 September 1953 (age 73) Kruševac, PR Serbia, FPR Yugoslavia
- Education: University of Belgrade

Ljiljana Habjanović Đurović (Serbian Cyrillic: Љиљана Хабјановић Ђуровић; born 6 September 1953) is a Serbian author.

== Early life and literary career ==
Habjanović Đurović was born in Kruševac, in what was then the People's Republic of Serbia in the Federal People's Republic of Yugoslavia. She was raised in the community and later graduated from the University of Belgrade Faculty of Economics. She worked as a bank clerk, a promoter in the field of foreign tourism, and a journalist for Duga before devoting herself to a full-time literary career in 1996. Habjanović Đurović is the owner of the publishing house Globosino Aleksandrija, which she founded in 2003.

She has written fifteen published novels, many of which have been best-sellers in Serbia. Her honours and recognitions include the prestigious Zlatni beočug award (2008) and the Vukova nagrada award (2009), the latter of which she received for her contributions to Serbian culture. She has been recognized by the Serbian Orthodox Church for the role of spirituality in her works.

Habjanović Đurović's works have also gained a following in other countries. She received the Zlatni Vitez (Golden Knight) literary award in Russia in 2011 and has won a significant following in Italy.

In 2008, Habjanović Đurović defended the response of Muslim organizations in Serbia to Sherry Jones's novel The Jewel of Medina. Jones's book was widely criticized by Muslim groups internationally for its depiction of Muhammad's wife Aisha; in Serbia, Muslim community leaders requested and received an apology from the book's publisher. The Muslim leaders emphasized that they had no interest in banning literature but wanted to draw attention to the desecration of their faith that they identified in the book. Some Serbian writers, including Aleksandar Čotrić, described the publishers' apology as "excessive." Habjanović Đurović disagreed, saying, "An author that writes about true actions and events has a responsibility to travel and investigate these events' historical background. This is especially important when one writes about the heritage of a nation that one does not belong to. [...] When I was writing An Observation of the Soul, in the segment where I wrote about Skanderbeg, I had to study Albanian history of the fifteenth century."

== Involvement with politics ==
Habjanović Đurović was a close friend of Mirjana Marković, the wife of Slobodan Milošević. In 1994, she wrote an article describing the initial meeting of Milošević and Marković at high school in Požarevac, while Marković was reading Sophocles's Antigone. In Habjanović Đurović's account, Marković's sorrow from the early death of her mother attracted Milošević to her, as he "felt the need to relieve her pain, to protect and cherish her." A May 1999 New York Times article described Habjanović Đurović as Marković's "hagiographer" and quoted her as saying that Marković "always openly and boldly claimed that [Milošević] would have been quite different without her, worse in every respect."

In February 2008, after the Kosovo government's unilateral declaration of independence, she wrote an article for Novosti with the title, "Kosovo's non-oblivion: Occupation will pass." This piece included the statement, "[N]o official of the state of Serbia must ever accept the secession of part of our country. Or succumb to delusions based on promises. Or get scared by threats. Each and every one of us must keep awareness inside us and pass it onto our descendants - that Kosovo-Metohija is a Serb land and that this which has happened is occupation that will end, just like any other occupation."

Habjanović Đurović appeared in the ninth position on the Serbian Progressive Party (SNS)'s Future We Believe In electoral list as a non-partisan candidate in the 2016 parliamentary election. This was tantamount to election, and she was indeed elected when the list won a majority victory with 131 out of 250 seats. She declined her mandate, saying that she was grateful to have contributed to the SNS's victory but wanted to devote her full attention to writing. The Serbian national assembly considers her to have briefly served as a deputy on 3 June 2016, before her resignation took effect.

== Published works ==
Her novels include:

- Јавна птица (Public Bird) (1988)
- Ана Марија ме није волела (Ana Maria Did Not Love Me) (1991)
- Ива (Iva) (1994)
- Женски родослов (Feminine Genealogy) (1996)
- Пауново перо (The Peacock Feather) (1999)
- Петкана (Petkana) (2001)
- Игра анђела (The Dance of Angels) (2003)
- Свих жалосних радост (The Joy of All the Sorrowful) (2005)
- Запис душе (An Observation of the Soul) (2007)
- Вода из камена (Water From Stone) (2009)
- Сјај у оку звезде (Radiant Gleam in the Eye of the Star) (2012)
- Наш отац (Our Father) (2014)
- Гора Преображења (Mount of Transfiguration) (2015)
- Онда је дошла Добра Вила (Then Came the Good Fairy) (2016)
- Со земљи (Salt of the Earth) (2018)
- To je ljubav, slepa sila (It Is Love, a Blind Force) (2020)
- Kćeri Svetog Vasilija (Daughters of St. Basil) (2022)
- Tamo gde je ona (There Where She Is) (2024)

Habjanović Đurović has also written a book on publishing called Србија пред огледалом (Serbia in Front of a Mirror) (1994), written five stories for children, and published anthologies of devotional poetry.
