= Duško Tarbuk =

Serbian politician

Duško Tarbuk (Serbian Cyrillic: Душко Тарбук; born 21 August 1972) is a politician in Serbia. He has served in the National Assembly of Serbia since 2016 as a member of the Serbian Progressive Party.

== Early life and career ==
Tarbuk was born in the Belgrade municipality of Zemun, in what was then the Socialist Republic of Serbia in the Socialist Federal Republic of Yugoslavia. He was raised in the city, studied marketing and industry at Union University, and was employed by various marketing firms from 1995 to 2008. He became assistant director of the public company "Rasveta" in 2015.

== Politician ==
=== Municipal politics ===
Tarbuk was a member of the Democratic Party of Serbia (Demokratska stranka Srbije, DSS) for many years. He appeared on the DSS's electoral list for the Zemun municipal assembly in the 2004 Serbian local elections, though he was not subsequently chosen for the party's assembly delegation. (From 2000 to 2011, mandates in Serbian elections were awarded to sponsoring parties and coalitions rather than individual candidates, and it was common practice for the mandates to be awarded out of numerical order. Tarbuk's specific list position had no bearing on whether or not he received a mandate.)

The DSS contested the 2008 local elections in an alliance with New Serbia. Tarbuk was included on the coalition's list in Zemun and was chosen as the city's deputy mayor when the DSS formed a coalition government with the far-right Serbian Radical Party after the election. When this government was dismissed in March 2009, he was appointed as the DSS representative on a new provisional administration pending new local elections – although his party, which opposed the transition, initially said it would boycott the proceedings. He continued to work as assistant to the municipal government until 2015.

Tarbuk again appeared on the DSS–New Serbia list in the 2009 Zemun local election. The list elected four members, and he was not chosen for a mandate.

Following a 2011 reform, mandates in Serbian elections were awarded to candidates on successful lists in numerical order. The DSS contested the 2013 Zemun local election in an alliance with Dveri. Tarbuk received the fourth position on the list and was elected when the list won exactly four mandates. His term in the local assembly was brief; he resigned his mandate on 2 June 2013.

In March 2014, it was reported that Tarbuk and fellow DSS organizer Petar Bojović became involved in a serious altercation with one another at a party function. He subsequently left the DSS and joined the Progressive Party.

=== Parliamentarian ===
Tarbuk received the fifty-fifth position on the party's Aleksandar Vučić — Serbia is winning electoral list for the 2016 Serbian parliamentary election and elected when the list won a landslide victory with 131 out of 250 mandates. During the 2016–20 parliament, he was a member of the assembly's environmental protection committee; a deputy member of the defence and internal affairs committee, the committee on Kosovo-Metohija, and the committee on finance, state budget, and control of public spending; and a member of the parliamentary friendship groups with Belarus, Kazakhstan, Tunisia, and the United Arab Emirates.

He received the sixty-seventh position on the Progressive Party's Aleksandar Vučić — For Our Children list in the 2020 Serbian parliamentary election and was elected to a second term when the list won a landslide majority with 188 mandates. He is now a full member of the finance committee, a member of the defence and internal affairs committee, a deputy member of the security services control committee, and a member of the parliamentary friendship groups with Austria, Belarus, Cuba, France, Greece, Russia, and Turkey.
