= Biljana Rubaković =

Serbian politician

- Биљана Рубаковић

Member of the National Assembly of the Republic of Serbia
- In office 3 June 2016 – 22 June 2016

Personal details
- Born: 1960 (age 65–66)
- Party: Dveri

Biljana Rubaković (Serbian Cyrillic: Биљана Рубаковић; born 1960) is a Serbian politician. She briefly served in the National Assembly of Serbia in 2016 as a member of the right-wing Dveri party.

== Private career ==
Rubaković is a professor from Čačak.

== Politician ==
=== Parliamentarian ===
Rubaković received the thirty-sixth position on Dveri's electoral list in the 2014 Serbian parliamentary election. During the campaign, she and other female Dveri candidates offered a view of women's rights based around traditional gender roles. The list did not cross the electoral threshold to win representation in the assembly.

She received the fifth position on a combined Dveri–Democratic Party of Serbia (DSS) list in the 2016 parliamentary election and was elected when the list won thirteen mandates. The Serbian Progressive Party (SNS) and its allies won a majority victory, and Dveri served in opposition.

Rubaković's departure from the national assembly was abrupt. On 21 June 2016, Dveri announced that Rubaković would serve as a member of the assembly's health and family committee and the committee for spatial planning, transport, infrastructure, and telecommunications. The following day, however, she resigned her mandate.

=== City politics in Čačak ===
Rubaković appeared in the sixth position on Dveri's list for the Čačak city assembly in the 2012 Serbian local elections and was elected when the list won thirteen out of seventy-five mandates. She was promoted to the third position for the 2016 local elections and was re-elected when the list won twenty-one seats, finishing second against the Progressive Party. In 2017, she and other Dveri representatives were cited for disorderly behaviour in the assembly.

Dveri boycotted the 2020 elections at both the republic and local levels, and she was not a candidate in the 2020 local elections.

=== After 2020 ===
Dveri contested the 2022 Serbian parliamentary election in an alliance with Žika Gojković's branch of the Movement for the Restoration of the Kingdom of Serbia (POKS). Rubaković received the thirty-fifth position on their combined list and was not re-elected when the list won ten mandates.

She is currently seeking re-election to the Čačak city assembly as the fourth candidate on Dveri's list in the 2024 Serbian local elections.
