= Marija Janjušević =

Serbian politician

Marija Janjušević (Serbian Cyrillic: Марија Јањушевић; born 19 November 1971) is a politician in Serbia. She served in the National Assembly of Serbia from 2016 to 2020 as a member of Dveri.

== Early life and career ==
Janjušević was born in Jesenice, in what was then the Socialist Republic of Slovenia in the Socialist Federal Republic of Yugoslavia. She received elementary and high school education in Aleksandrovac, Serbia, and graduated from the faculty of agriculture at the University of Novi Sad. She later became the director of a company dealing in agricultural products and the director of a media monitoring service. She lives in Inđija.

== Politician ==
Janjušević joined the Democratic Party of Serbia (Demokratska stranka Srbije; DSS) in 2000 and received the 144th position on a combined electoral list of the DSS and New Serbia in the 2007 Serbian parliamentary election. The list won forty-seven mandates, and she was not included in her party's assembly delegation. (From 2000 to 2011, Serbian parliamentary mandates were awarded to sponsoring parties or coalitions rather than to individual candidates, and it was common practice for mandates to be assigned out of numerical order. Janjušević could have been awarded a mandate despite her low position on the list, though in fact she was not.) She left the DSS in 2010 and joined Dveri the following year.

Serbia's electoral system was reformed in 2011, such that parliamentary mandates were assigned in numerical order to candidates on successful lists. Janjušević received the eleventh position on a combined list of Dveri and the DSS in the 2016 parliamentary election and was elected when the list won thirteen mandates. Serbian Progressive Party and its allies won the election, and Dveri served in opposition. During her term in parliament, she was member of the committee on human and gender rights and gender equality; a deputy member of the committee on labour, social issues, social inclusion, and poverty reduction; a member of the working group for the political empowerment of persons with disabilities; a deputy member of Serbia's delegation to the Parliamentary Assembly of the Mediterranean; and a member of the parliamentary friendship groups with Armenia, Cuba, Cyprus, France, Greece, Italy, Kazakhstan, Montenegro, Morocco, Slovakia, Slovenia, and Venezuela.

Dveri joined an opposition boycott of the assembly in 2019 and did not participate in the 2020 parliamentary elections. Janjušević's assembly mandate ended on 3 August 2020. In an interview from this period, she said that she was engaged on a short-term project dealing with media freedom and that she planned to concentrate afterward on work with the Trezor association.

Janjušević has also sought election to the Assembly of Vojvodina on two occasions, receiving the twelfth position on Dveri's electoral list for the 2012 Vojvodina provincial election and the third position on a combined DSS–Dveri list for the 2016 provincial election. In addition, she appeared in the second position on a combined DSS–Dveri list for the Inđija municipal assembly in the 2016 Serbian local elections. In each instance, the list failed to cross the electoral threshold to win representation in the relevant assembly.
