= Svetlana Kozić =

Serbian politician (born 1978)

Svetlana Kozić (Serbian Cyrillic: Светлана Козић; born 1978) is a politician in Serbia. She has served in the Assembly of Vojvodina since 2016, originally as a member of the It's Enough – Restart association (Dosta je bilo, DJB), better known in English as "Enough Is Enough." Since March 2018, she has served as an independent.

== Early life and career ==
Kozić was born in Kikinda, Vojvodina, then part of the Socialist Republic of Serbia in the Socialist Federal Republic of Yugoslavia. She holds a Bachelor of Science degree in Economics from the University of Novi Sad.

She oversees a private agency focused on marketing, consulting, management, and entrepreneurship training. She served as vice-president of the General Association of Entrepreneurs Kikinda for three years and continues to lead the organization's women's section. She is also a founder of Artese, a non-governmental organization (NGO) bringing together female entrepreneurs in Kikinda.

== Political career ==
The 2016 Vojvodina provincial election was the first in the province's recent history to be held entirely under a system of proportional representation. Kozić received the first position on DJB's list and was elected when it won seven mandates. The election was won by the Serbian Progressive Party and its allies, and DJB served in opposition; Kozić led its group in the assembly.

She was also elected to the National Assembly of Serbia in the 2016 Serbian parliamentary election, which was held concurrently with the Vojvodina election. She received the fifth position on DJB's list and was elected when the list won sixteen seats. As she could not hold a dual mandate in the republican and provincial assemblies, she resigned her seat at the republic level. The National Assembly website lists her as having served from 3 to 6 June 2016, before her resignation took effect.

In November 2017, Kozić accused the government of Vojvodina of funding newly-established media outlets that existed only to support the administration.

Kozić was expelled from DJB on 29 March 2018, along with other members of the movement. The DJB's main board said that the expelled members had ignored binding decisions, created factions, and sought to bring about the destruction of the organization. Kozić responded that the expulsions were due to some DJB members talking openly about leadership and organizational issues in the movement. She added that the excluded members, and their supporters still within the DJB, could create a new party.
