= Miloš Bošković =

Serbian politician

Miloš Bošković (Serbian Cyrillic: Милош Бошковић; born 1985) is a politician in Serbia. He served in the National Assembly of Serbia from 2016 to 2018 as a member of the anti-establishment and reformist It's Enough – Restart association, better known in English by the name "Enough Is Enough."

Bošković is from Niš and works as a programmer. He received the fifteenth position on the "Enough Is Enough" list for the 2016 Serbian parliamentary election and was elected when the list won sixteen mandates. He served in the assembly as an opposition deputy and was a member of the environmental protection committee and a deputy member of the committee on Kosovo-Metohija and the committee on spatial planning, transport, infrastructure, and telecommunications. He also served on the parliamentary friendship groups with Austria, Croatia, and the United Kingdom.

Bošković resigned from the assembly on March 16, 2018, saying that he was unhappy with the direction of the It's Enough – Restart organization.
