= Olivera Ognjanović =

Serbian politician

Olivera Ognjanović (Serbian Cyrillic: Оливера Огњановић; born 25 December 1969) is a politician in Serbia. She has served in the National Assembly of Serbia on an almost continuous basis since 2016 as a member of the Serbian Progressive Party.

== Private career ==
Ognjanović has a master's degree in management and lives in the Belgrade municipality of Grocka. She was the director of the Grocka public utility company prior to her election to the national assembly.

== Politician ==
=== Municipal politics ===
Ognjanović appeared on the eighth position on the electoral list of the far-right Serbian Radical Party for the Grocka municipal assembly in the 2004 Serbian local elections. The list won eight mandates and she was not, at least initially, included in its assembly delegation. (From 2000 to 2011, mandates in Serbian elections were awarded at the discretion of successful parties and alliances, and it was common practice for the mandates to be assigned out of numerical order. Ognjanović did not automatically receive a mandate by virtue of her list position.) She received the tenth position on the party's list in the 2008 Serbian local elections and on this occasion received a mandate when the list won thirteen seats.

The Radical Party experienced a serious split later in 2008, with several members joining the more moderate Progressive Party under the leadership of Tomislav Nikolić and Aleksandar Vučić. Ognjanović sided with the Progressives.

Serbia's electoral system was reformed in 2011, such that mandates were awarded in numerical order to candidates on successful lists. Ognjanović was given the twenty-third position on the Progressive Party's list for the 2012 local elections in Grocka and was not re-elected when the list won eleven mandates.

=== Parliamentarian ===
Ognjanović received the 123rd position on the Progressive Party's Aleksandar Vučić – Serbia Is Winning list in the 2016 Serbian parliamentary election and was elected when the list won a majority victory with 131 out of 250 mandates. During the 2016–20 parliament, she was a member of the assembly's committee on human and minority rights and gender equality; a deputy member of the health and family committee and the committee on the diaspora and Serbs in the region; a member of the assembly working group for national minority rights; a deputy member of Serbia's delegation to the Parliamentary Assembly of the Mediterranean; and a member of Serbia's parliamentary friendship groups with Algeria, Argentina, Australia, Belarus, China, Cuba, Georgia, Indonesia, Iran, Italy, Luxembourg, Mexico, the countries of Sub-Saharan Africa, Tunisia, and Uganda.

She was given the 196th position on the successor Aleksandar Vučić — For Our Children list in the 2020 parliamentary election and narrowly missed direct re-election when the list won a landslide victory with 188 mandates. She was able to return to the assembly on 10 November 2020 as the replacement for Marko Đurić, who had resigned on being appointed as ambassador of Serbia to the United States of America. Ognjanović is a member of the parliamentary friendship groups with Australia, China, Cuba, Egypt, Russia, Spain, and the United Kingdom.
