= Miroslava Stanković Đuričić =

Serbian politician

Miroslava Stanković-Đuričić (Serbian Cyrillic: Мирослава Станковић-Ђуричић; born June 3, 1976) is a politician in Serbia. She has served in the National Assembly of Serbia since 2016 as a member of the far-right Serbian Radical Party.

== Private career ==
Stanković-Đuričić is a graduate geographer and is president of the Danube District Committee in Smederevo. She lives in Smederevska Palanka.

== Political career ==
Stanković-Đuričić has served as a Radical Party member of the Smederevska Palanka municipal assembly. She received the twenty-first position on the party's electoral list in the 2016 Serbian parliamentary election and was elected when the party won twenty-two seats. She is a member of the assembly's environmental protection committee; a deputy member of the committee on the economy, regional development, trade, tourism, and energy; and a member of the parliamentary friendship groups with Cuba and Russia.
