= Ljibuška Lakatoš =

Serbian politician

Ljibuška Lakatoš (Slovak: Libuška Lakatošová, Serbian Cyrillic: Љибушка Лакатош; born 1972) is a politician in Serbia. She served in the National Assembly of Serbia from 2014 to 2018 as a member of the Serbian Progressive Party. Since December 2018, she has served as the leader of Serbia's Slovak National Council.

== Private career ==
Lakatoš is a professor of physical education and is the head of the municipality of Stara Pazova's department for sports, youth, and culture.

== Political career ==
=== Municipal politics ===
Lakatoš contested the 2012 Stara Pazova municipal election as a candidate of the United Regions of Serbia party.

=== Parliamentarian ===
Lakatoš received the 126th position on the Progressive Party's Aleksandar Vučić — Future We Believe In electoral list in the 2014 Serbian parliamentary election and was elected when the list won a landslide victory with 158 out of 250 mandates. She was promoted to the 105th position on the Progressive Party's successor Aleksandar Vučić – Serbia Is Winning list in 2016 and was re-elected when the list won 131 mandates.

During her second term, Lakatoš was a member of the parliamentary committee on human and minority rights and gender equality; a deputy member of the committee on education, science, technological development, and the information society; the leader of Serbia's parliamentary friendship group with Slovakia; and a member of the parliamentary friendship groups with Croatia, Cyprus, Greece, Hungary, Indonesia, Italy, Russia, and Tunisia.

=== Slovak National Council ===
Lakatoś received the second position on the Slovaks Forward electoral list in the 2014 elections for Serbia's Slovak National Council and was elected when the list won nine out of twenty-nine mandates. She subsequently left Slovaks Forward and headed a list called Matica Slovakia in Serbia in the 2018 council elections. She was re-elected when the list won fourteen seats. Lakatoš was chosen as leader of the council on 4 December 2018 and resigned from the National Assembly on 25 December.
