= Ivan Manojlović =

Serbian politician

Ivan Manojlović (Serbian Cyrillic: Иван Манојловић; born 1975) is a politician in Serbia. He served in the National Assembly of Serbia from 2016 to 2018 as a member of the Serbian Progressive Party.

== Early life and private career ==
Manojlović has a master's degree in economics. He a member of the Progressive Party's information committee in Kruševac, where he resides.

In December 2015, when Progressive Party cabinet minister Bratislav Gašić made inappropriate sexual remarks to B92 journalist Zlatija Labović, Manojlović accused Labović of having provoked Gašić and suggested that she was acting on orders from her superiors. The Progressive Party dissociated itself from this statement and said that Manojlović was stating his own opinion. Gašić, for his part, issued a public apology for his remarks.

== Member of the National Assembly ==
Manojlović received the sixty-fourth position on the Progressive Party's Aleksandar Vučić – Serbia Is Winning list for the 2016 parliamentary election and was elected when the list won a majority victory with 131 mandates. He was a member of the parliamentary committee on the economy, regional development, trade, tourism, and energy; a deputy member of two other committees; and a member of the parliamentary friendship groups for Azerbaijan, Belarus, Canada, China, the Czech Republic, France, Germany, Greece, India, Iran, Italy, Montenegro, Russia, Spain, Switzerland, Tunisia, and the United States of America.

Manojlović resigned from the assembly on 21 September 2018.
