= Ivana Stojiljković =

Serbian politician

Ivana Stojiljković (Serbian Cyrillic: Ивана Стојиљковић; born 1981) is a Serbian politician. She served in the National Assembly of Serbia from 2014 to 2018 as a representative of the Serbian Progressive Party.

== Early life and career ==
Stojiljković was born in Pula, in what was then the Socialist Republic of Croatia in the Socialist Federal Republic of Yugoslavia. She moved to Užice, Serbia, as a child and was raised in that community. She earned a bachelor's degree in civil engineering from the University of Belgrade and has subsequently been a leading engineer and urbanist with Užice's construction directorate. In 2010, she became president of the Environmental Protection Council and the Zlatibor District Urban Planning Council.

Stojiljković has also worked as a journalist in local media and is a member of the Serbian branch of Mensa International.

== Political career ==
Stojiljković joined the Progressive Party in 2010. In 2013, she was appointed to leadership positions in the party in Užice and the Zlatibor District.

She was given the thirty-ninth position on the Progressive Party's Aleksandar Vučić — Future We Believe In electoral list for the 2014 Serbian parliamentary election and was elected when the list won 158 out of 250 mandates. She was promoted to twenty-first on the successor Aleksandar Vučić — Serbia is Winning list for the 2016 parliamentary election and was re-elected when the list won 131 mandates.

During her second term, Stojiljković was chair of the assembly's environmental protection committee; a member of the committee on spatial planning, transport, infrastructure, and telecommunications; a deputy member of the defence and internal affairs committee; and the deputy chair of a commission set up to "Investigate the Consequences of the North Atlantic Treaty Organization (NATO) 1999 Bombing on the Health of the Citizens of Serbia, as well as the Environment, with a Special Focus on the Impact of the Depleted Uranium Projectiles." She was also the head of Serbia's parliamentary friendship group with India and a member of parliamentary friendship groups with Belarus, Bosnia and Herzegovina, Bulgaria, China, Cuba, Germany, Greece, Indonesia, Italy, Kazakhstan, Russia, Spain, and the United States of America.

In March 2018, Stojiljković thanked India's ambassador to Serbia for what she described as "India's principled stand on the territorial integrity and sovereignty of Serbia."

She resigned from the National Assembly on 24 December 2018 and is now Serbia's consul-general in Trieste, Italy.
