= Konstantin Arsenović =

Serbian politician

Konstantin Arsenović (Serbian Cyrillic: Константин Арсеновић; 1940–January 31, 2017) was a politician and military official in Serbia. He served in the National Assembly of Serbia from 2008 until his death in 2017. Arsenović was a member of the Party of United Pensioners of Serbia (PUPS) and a deputy speaker of the assembly.

== Early life and military career ==
Arsenović was born in 1940 in the village of Gornje Košlje in the Ljubovija municipality, at the time part of the Drina Banovina in the Kingdom of Yugoslavia but formerly and subsequently a part of Serbia. His parliamentary biography indicates that, after attending technical high school, he attended Yugoslavia's Military Technical Academy, High Military Technical Academy, Command and Staff School, and National Defence School. He served in the Yugoslav People's Army and then the Army of the Federal Republic of Yugoslavia from 1961 to 2000, overseeing a variety of responsibilities.

On September 5, 1996, Arsenović was appointed by the President of the Federal Republic of Yugoslavia Zoran Lilić as the assistant head of the Army General Staff responsible for reinforcements. On December 25, 1998, he was appointed as an advisor to minister of defense Pavle Bulatović. He retired in 2000 with the rank of lieutenant colonel general.

== Political career ==
Arsenović was a founding member of the Party of United Pensioners of Serbia in 2005. This party contested the 2007 Serbian parliamentary election in an alliance with the Social Democratic Party, and Arsenović received the seventh position on their combined electoral list. The list did not cross the electoral threshold to win representation in the assembly.

The United Pensioners later joined an electoral alliance led by the Socialist Party of Serbia for the 2008 parliamentary election. Arsenović was given the seventh position on the alliance's list and entered the assembly as part of the PUPS delegation after the alliance won twenty mandates. (From 2000 to 2011, Serbian parliamentary mandates were awarded to sponsoring parties or coalitions rather than to individual candidates, and it was common practice for mandates to be awarded out of numerical order. Arsenović did not automatically receive a parliamentary mandate by virtue of his position on the list, though he was in fact awarded a mandate and served as part of a five-member United Pensioners delegation for the next four years.) The United Pensioners were included in Mirko Cvetković's administration, and Arsenović served as a parliamentary supporter of the government.

Serbia's electoral system was reformed in 2011, such that parliamentary mandates were awarded in numerical order to candidates on successful lists. The United Pensioners' alliance with the Socialist Party continued into the 2012 and 2014 elections; Arsenović was returned to parliament on both occasions, in each case after receiving the sixth position on the alliance's electoral list. PUPS remained part of the government from 2012 to 2014 and provided external support to Aleksandar Vučić's administration from 2014 to 2016. Arsenović was named as a deputy speaker of the assembly following the 2012 election, a position that he retained for all sittings of the assembly until his death.

In 2011, Arsenović offered support to an idea proposed by the Serbian Progressive Party that Serbia reinstate a conscript army. He argued that Serbia did not have an army capable of carrying out the fundamental tasks required of it and offered his view that conscription should never have been abolished. He further argued that most people in Serbia held the same belief and would willingly send their children to military service.

For the 2016 Serbian parliamentary election, the United Pensioners joined the Aleksandar Vučić – Serbia Is Winning electoral alliance led by the Progressive Party. Arsenović received the sixty-first position on their list and was declared re-elected when the list a won a landslide victory with 131 out of 250 mandates. PUPS returned to direct participation in government after the election. In this sitting of the assembly, Arsenović was a member of the committee of the rights of the child and a member of the friendship groups for Belarus, Montenegro, and Spain.

== Death ==
Arsenović died on January 31, 2017, aged seventy-six.
