= Srđan Kružević =

Serbian politician (born 1977)

Srđan Kružević (Serbian Cyrillic: Срђан Кружевић; born 17 October 1977) is a politician in Serbia. He served in the National Assembly of Serbia from 2014 to 2016 as a member of United Serbia (Jedinstvena Srbija, JS). Kružević has been the deputy mayor of Novi Sad since July 2016 and a member of the Serbian Progressive Party since December of the same year.

== Early life and career ==
Kružević has a degree from the University of Novi Sad Faculty of Economics. He has been a private entrepreneur and worked in the Novi Sad division of Srbijagas as an advisor to the general director for investments. From 2012 to 2014, he was the general manager of Elektrovojvodina.

== Political career ==
Formally a member of the Socialist Party of Serbia and Maja Gojković's People's Party, Kružević subsequently joined United Serbia and became a party vice-president and the chair of its Vojvodina provincial organization in 2009.

United Serbia has maintained an electoral alliance with the Socialist Party since 2008. Kružević received the seventy-seventh position on the Socialist-led electoral list in the 2012 Serbian parliamentary election and the twenty-first position on the party's list in the concurrent 2012 Vojvodina provincial election. The lists won forty-four and thirteen seats, respectively, and Kružević was not elected to either body.

He was promoted to the twenty-fourth position on the Socialist-led list for the 2014 Serbian parliamentary election and was elected when the list once again won forty-four mandates. The Socialists participated in a coalition government led by the Progressive Party after the election; United Serbia did not have direct representation in government but provided outside support in the assembly. In this sitting of parliament, Kružević served as part of Serbia's delegation to the South-East European Cooperation Process Parliamentary Assembly.

Kružević was elected to republican, provincial, and municipal offices in 2016. He received the twelfth position on the Socialist-led list in the 2016 Serbian parliamentary election and was elected to a second term in the assembly of the republic when the list won twenty-nine seats. The Socialists remained in a governing alliance with the Progressives after the election, and Kružević continued to serve as a government supporter. He also received the second position on the Socialist list in the 2016 Vojvodina provincial election and was elected when the list won twelve mandates. He was not permitted to hold a dual mandate in the republic and provincial assemblies, and, after attending the first three meetings of the Vojvodina assembly, he resigned his provincial mandate effective 18 July 2016.

He was also elected to the Novi Sad municipal assembly in the 2016 Serbian local elections after receiving the second position on the Socialist-led list in the city, which won seven mandates. The Progressive Party won the municipal election and subsequently formed a new local coalition government that included the Socialist alliance. Kružević was selected as the city's deputy mayor on 1 July 2016, serving under Miloš Vučević. By virtue of holding this position, he resigned from the republican assembly on 1 August 2016.

Kružević left United Serbia and joined the Progressive Party in December 2016.
