= Miroljub Stanković =

Serbian politician

Miroljub Stanković (Serbian Cyrillic: Мирољуб Станковић; 19 July 1946 – 22 July 2017) was a politician in Serbia. He served in the National Assembly of Serbia as a member of the Party of United Pensioners of Serbia (PUPS) from 2014 until his death.

== Private career ==
Stanković worked in the Serbian police force and at the Educational Correctional Centre at Kruševac.

== Political career ==
Stanković joined the PUPS on its formation in 2005 and served on its main board from then until his death. He also became president of the party's municipal organization in Niš in 2010 and was later a party vice-president.

The PUPS was aligned with the Socialist Party of Serbia from 2008 to 2016 and fielded candidates on its electoral lists during this period. Stanković was awarded the thirty-fourth position on the Socialist-led list in the 2014 Serbian parliamentary election and was elected when the list won forty-four mandates. The Socialists participated in the coalition government that was formed after the election, and the PUPS provided support for the administration in the assembly. For the 2016 Serbian parliamentary election, the PUPS formed a new electoral alliance with the Serbian Progressive Party. Stanković received the 100th position and was re-elected when the list won a majority victory with 131 out of 250 mandates.

Stanković served on the assembly committee on Kosovo and Metohija. He had one of the best attendance records in the assembly but only spoke once, in October 2014, when he complained about the lack of heat in the assembly room.
