= Jasmina Nikolić =

Serbian politician

- Јасмина Николић
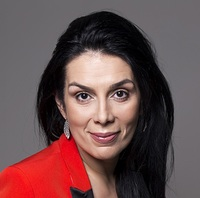
- Nikolić in 2017

Jasmina Nikolić (Serbian Cyrillic: Јасмина Николић; born 1971) is an educator, academic, and politician in Serbia. She served in the National Assembly of Serbia from 2016 to 2018 as a member of the reformist It's Enough – Restart (Dosta je bilo, DJB) association, better known in English by the name "Enough Is Enough."

== Early life and private career ==
Nikolić is a graduate of the University of Belgrade Faculty of Philology. She has worked at the department since 1997, specializing in the Spanish language and Spanish literature, and has been a senior lecturer since 2014. During the Yugoslav Wars of the 1990s, she worked as an interpreter and correspondent for the Spanish paper El País and the Brazilian paper O Globo. She became a member of Serbia's expert team for reform of higher education in 2010 and was its vice-president from 2013 to 2017. Nikolić is based in Belgrade.

== Political career ==
Nikolić received the fifth position on the It's Enough – Restart association's electoral list in the 2014 election. The list did not cross the electoral threshold to win representation in the assembly.

She was promoted to the third position on the association's list in the 2016 election and was elected when the list won sixteen mandates. An opposition deputy, she was a member of the assembly's defence and internal affairs committee, foreign affairs committee, and committee on Kosovo-Metohija; a deputy member of the assembly's judiciary, public administration, and local self-government committee; a member of the European Union–Serbia stabilization and association parliamentary committee; a member of Serbia's delegation to the NATO Parliamentary Assembly; and a member of Serbia's parliamentary friendship groups with Croatia, Macedonia, Spain, the United Kingdom, and the United States of America.

Nikolić left DJB in early November 2018. She initially planned to join a new parliamentary group with other former DJB members, but she ultimately resigned from the assembly on 13 November 2018.
