= Vesna Rakonjac =

Serbian politician

Vesna Rakonjac (Serbian Cyrillic: Весна Ракоњац; born 10 May 1967) is a politician, administrator, and medical doctor in Serbia. She served in the National Assembly of Serbia from 2012 to 2017 as a member of the Serbian Progressive Party and is now director of the biomedicine directorate in Serbia's ministry of health.

== Early life and career ==
Rakonjac was born in Kruševac, at the time part of the Socialist Republic of Serbia in the Socialist Federal Republic of Yugoslavia. She works at the Kruševac Public Health Institute as a doctor in the development of hygiene and human ecology. She is a specialist in hygiene, with a secondary focus on nutrition. In 2006, she criticized the absence of effective sex education teaching in Serbian schools relative to previous years.

== Political career ==
Rakonjac received the ninetieth position on the Progressive Party's Let's Get Serbia Moving electoral list in the 2012 Serbian parliamentary election. The list won seventy-three mandates, and she was not initially elected. The Progressive Party subsequently formed a coalition government with the Socialist Party of Serbia and other parties, and several elected members of the assembly resigned to take government and ministerial positions. Rakonjac was awarded a mandate on 10 December 2012 as a replacement for Gojko Radić and served as part of the government's parliamentary majority.

She was promoted to the fifty-fourth position on the Progressive Party's Aleksandar Vučić — Future We Believe In list in the 2014 parliamentary election and was re-elected when the list won a majority victory with 158 of 250 seats. She was again included on the successor Aleksandar Vučić — Serbia Is Winning list in the 2016 election and was elected to a third term when it won a second majority victory with 131 mandates. Rakonjac served as chair of the assembly committee on labour, social issues, social inclusion, and poverty reduction in her second and third terms in office.

She resigned from the legislature on 21 December 2017 on being appointed as the director of the biomedicine directorate in Serbia's health ministry. In February 2018, she signed a protocol with her counterpart in Italy for co-operation on organ donation and transportation. In July of the same year, she gave an interview with the journal Politika in support of Serbia's new law on organ donation.
