= Marko Milenković =

Serbian politician

Marko Milenković (Serbian Cyrillic: Марко Миленковић; born 20 December 1974) is a Serbian politician. He served three terms in the National Assembly of Serbia between 2007 and 2017, as a member of the far-right Serbian Radical Party. Milenković subsequently left the party and is now state secretary in Serbia's ministry of education, science, and technological development.

== Early life and private career ==
Milenković was born in Žitorađa, then part of the Socialist Republic of Serbia in the Socialist Federal Republic of Yugoslavia. He has lectured at the University of Niš Faculty of Arts since 2004.

== Political career ==
Milenković received the 246th position (out of 250) on the Radical Party's list in the 2000 Serbian parliamentary election. The party won twenty-three seats, and he was not included in its assembly delegation. (From 2000 to 2011, Serbian parliamentary mandates were awarded to sponsoring parties or coalitions rather than to individual candidates, and it was common practice for the mandates to be awarded out of numerical order. Milenković could have been awarded a mandate despite his low position on the list, although in the event he was not.)

He received the eighty-first position on the Radical Party's list for the 2007 parliamentary election. The party won eighty-one seats, and he was, on this occasion, chosen for its delegation. Although the Radicals won more seats than any other party in this election, they fell well short of a majority and served in opposition. Milenković was again included on the party's list for the 2008 election, in which the party won seventy-eight seats, and was again included in its delegation for the parliament that followed. The results of the election were initially inclusive, although the Radicals ultimately remained in opposition.

The Radical Party experienced a significant split later in 2008, with several members joining the more moderate Serbian Progressive Party under the leadership of Tomislav Nikolić and Aleksandar Vučić. Milenković remained with the Radicals.

Serbia's electoral system was reformed in 2011, such that parliamentary mandates were awarded in numerical order to candidates on successful lists. Milenković received the eleventh position on the Radical Party's list for the 2012 Serbian parliamentary election, in which the party fell below the electoral threshold to win representation in the assembly. He was promoted to the eighth position in the 2014 election, in which the party again failed to cross the threshold.

The Radicals returned to the National Assembly in the 2016 parliamentary election, winning twenty-two mandates; Milenković, who received the twenty-second position on their list, was duly re-elected. The Progressive Party and its allies won a majority victory, and the Radicals again served in opposition. During this sitting of the assembly, Milenković was a member of the parliamentary friendship groups with China, Indonesia, and Russia.

Milenković's association with the Radical Party ended abruptly in April 2017, after party leader Vojislav Šešelj described him as a "traitor" for having allegedly campaigned for Progressive Party leader Aleksandar Vučić in the 2017 Serbian presidential election. Milenković responded that he no longer wished "to be a member of the [Radical Party], nor a member of their club, nor to sit in the Assembly with them, because they do not value work and results." He also cited Vjerica Radeta's influence in the party as a reason for his departure. He resigned his seat in the assembly on 12 April 2017.

Shortly after leaving the Radical Party and the assembly, Milenković was appointed as a state secretary in Serbia's ministry of education, science, and technological development, overseen by the non-partisan minister Mladen Šarčević.
