= Ratko Jankov =

Serbian politician and academic (born 1945)

Ranko Jankov (Serbian Cyrillic: Ратко Јанков; born 1945, died 2026.) is an academic and politician in Serbia. He was a member of the National Assembly of Serbia from 2016 to 2018 as a member of the reformist It's Enough – Restart (Dosta je bilo, DJB) association, better known in English by the name "Enough Is Enough."

== Early life and academic career ==
Jankov was born in Novi Sad, Vojvodina, at about the time the province became part of the People's Republic of Serbia in the newly formed Federal People's Republic of Yugoslavia. He received an undergraduate degree (1967), a master's degree (1970), and a Ph.D. (1972) in Chemistry from the University of Belgrade, became an assistant at the same university following his graduation, and eventually rose through the ranks to become a full professor and head of the department of biochemistry. His main areas of interest are natural product chemistry, immunochemistry, and chemistry in education. Jankov was a member of the National Education Council of the Republic of Serbia from 2004 to 2008 and the assistant minister for fundamental research in the Serbian ministry of science from 2007 to 2008.

== Political career ==
Jankov received the eighth position on DJB's electoral list for the 2016 Serbian parliamentary election and was elected when the list won sixteen mandates. He was a member of the parliamentary committee on education, science, technological development, and the information society; a deputy member of the committee on the diaspora and Serbs in the region; and a member of the parliamentary friendship group with Brazil.

Jankov opposed the selection of Muamer Zukorlić as chair of the education committee in 2016, noting Zukorlić's prior status as a mufti. He said that he opposed bringing science under the authority of religion, irrespective of the religious community in question.

He left DJB in early November 2018. Although Jankov initially planned to join a new parliamentary group with other former DJB members, he instead resigned from the assembly on 13 November 2018.
