= Dušan Pavlović (economist) =

Serbian political economist

- Душан Павловић
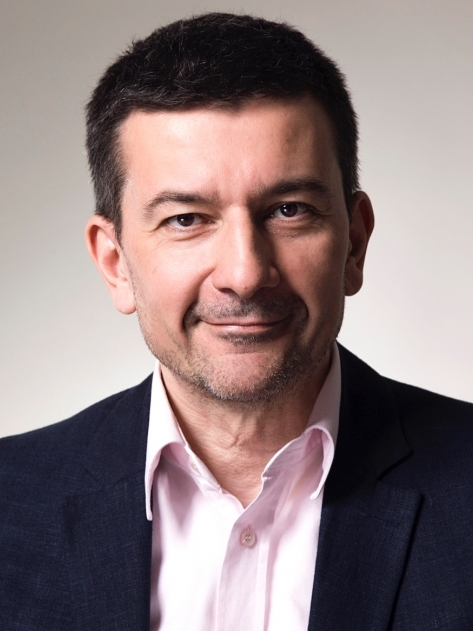
- Pavlović in 2017

Member of the National Assembly
- In office 2 June 2016 – 13 November 2018

Personal details
- Born: 10 April 1969 (age 57) Zagreb, SR Croatia, SFR Yugoslavia
- Party: DJB (2014–2018)
- Education: University of Belgrade
- Occupation: Political scientist; professor
- Other offices: 5–13 November 2018: President of the PMBD parliamentary group

Dušan Pavlović (Serbian Cyrillic: Душан Павловић; born 10 April 1969) is a Serbian political economist, political analyst, author, former politician and active musician. He is a professor at the Faculty of Political Sciences of the University of Belgrade.

Pavlović previously worked at the G17 Institute. He was an advisor to Saša Radulović during his tenure as minister of economy, from 2013 to 2014. He later co-founded Enough is Enough, a neoliberal populist organisation. He was elected member of the National Assembly of Serbia in 2016 and served until his resignation in 2018.

During the late 1980s and early 1990s, Pavlović was the guitarist for the popular rock band Vampiri.

== Early life and education ==
Pavlović was born on 10 April 1969 in Zagreb, Socialist Republic of Croatia, Socialist Federal Republic of Yugoslavia. He moved with his mother to Belgrade in 1981. Between 1989 and 1994, while a student in Belgrade, Pavlović was a founder member of doo-wop band Vampiri. He played a rhythm guitar.

He received his bachelor's degree from the Faculty of Political Sciences at the University of Belgrade in 1994, and master and PhD degrees from the Central European University in Budapest in 1997 and 2003, respectively. Since 2005, he has taught political economy with public choice at the Faculty of Political Science in Belgrade, where he currently holds the title of a professor. His areas of interest are political economy of democratic institutions, and rational and public choice theory.

== Career ==
=== Musical career ===
During the late 1980s and early 1990s, Pavlović was the guitarist for the Serbian and Yugoslav band Vampiri, which enjoyed large popularity with their 1950s-influenced doo wop and rockabilly sound. Pavlović recorded three albums with the group, Rama lama ding dong (1991), Tačno u ponoć (High Midnight, 1991) and Be-be (Ba-bies, 1993), before leaving the band and retiring from the music scene.

=== Research ===
Between 1996 and 2005, he worked at the Institute for European Studies (1996–2001), the G17 Institute (2001–2003), and the Jefferson Institute in Belgrade (2004–2005). His academic works include Consolidation of Democratic Institutions in Serbia after 2000 (2007), Writings in Political Economy (2010), and Game Theory: Basic Games and Applications (2014). He authored a number of articles in Politika, Danas, Vreme and other newspapers from 2001 to 2013. He had a blog on public policy and theoretical issues, named Political Blogonomy.

=== Politics ===
Between September 2013 and January 2014, Pavlović was an advisor to the minister of economy, position held by his friend Saša Radulović, in the government dominated by Aleksandar Vučić's Serbian Progressive Party. When Radulović resigned after falling out with Vučić, Pavlović did the same. Together, they formed neoliberal populist Enough is Enough movement, advocating the changes in Serbian political culture and the break-up of political cartels in Serbia, which has eventually raised to the level of a political party. In the 2016 Serbian parliamentary election, the movement won 6% of the popular vote and 16 seats in the National Assembly of Serbia. Pavlović, who was second on the list, became a member of the National Assembly on 2 June 2016.

Pavlović left Enough is Enough on 1 November 2018, and submitted the resignation to the Serbian Assembly on 13 November 2018. From 5 November until his resignation, he headed the Politics Should be Different parliamentary group.

== Money Wasting Machine ==
In April 2016, he published a book titled Mašina za rasipanje para. Pet meseci u ministarstvu privrede for the publisher Dan Graf, which is half-theoretical, half-biographical account of the five months he spent as an advisor to the minister of economy, Saša Radulović. The book sold 1,000 copies within less than two months. Dan Graf added another 1,000 copies in mid-June 2016. The third updated edition in another 600 copies came out in October 2018 with the new chapter on neoliberalism in Serbia. The CEU Press printed the English version of this book in Summer 2022.
