= Marko Blagojević (born 1976) =

Politician and diplomat in Serbia

Marko Blagojević (Serbian Cyrillic: Марко Благојевић; born 1976) is a politician and diplomat in Serbia. He served in the National Assembly of Serbia from 2016 to 2017 as a member of the Serbian Progressive Party parliamentary group, although he does not appear to have been a member of the party. In February 2017, he was appointed as Serbia's ambassador to Cyprus.

== Early life and career ==
Blagojević is from Belgrade. He was secretary-general of Serbia's ministry of foreign affairs during Ivan Mrkić's tenure as minister.

== Political career ==
Blagojević received the 106th position on the Progressive Party's Aleksandar Vučić – Serbia Is Winning electoral list in the 2016 parliamentary election and was elected when the coalition won a landslide victory with 131 out of 250 mandates. During his time in parliament, he was a member of the parliamentary committees on European integration, foreign affairs, and defence and internal affairs; a substitute member of the committee on Kosovo-Metohija; and a member of the parliamentary friendship groups for China, Cyprus, India, Norway, Switzerland, and the United Kingdom. He was also a deputy member of Serbia's delegation to the Parliamentary Assembly of the Council of Europe, where he sat with the European People's Party group.

== Ambassador ==
Blagojević was appointed by President Tomislav Nikolić as Serbia's ambassador to Cyprus on February 22, 2017. He formally resigned from the assembly on April 19, 2017.
