= Bojana Božanić =

Serbian politician

- Бојана Божанић

Member of the National Assembly of the Republic of Serbia
- In office 31 May 2012 – 16 April 2014

Personal details
- Born: 11 November 1981 (age 44)
- Party: DSS (until 2014); SNP (2014–17); ZS (since 2017)

Bojana Božanić (Serbian Cyrillic: Бојана Божанић; born 11 November 1981) is a Serbian politician and administrator. She served in the National Assembly of Serbia from 2012 to 2014 as a member of the Democratic Party of Serbia (DSS) and has been active in the municipal politics of Čajetina. Božanić is now a member of Healthy Serbia (ZS). Since 2016, she has been the director of the public company Gold Gondola Zlatibor.

== Private career ==
Božanić was born in Užice, in what was then the Socialist Republic of Serbia in the Socialist Federal Republic of Yugoslavia. In 2006, she graduated from the University of Belgrade Faculty of Philology as a professor of English.

== Politician ==
=== Democratic Party of Serbia ===
Božanić appeared in the seventh position on the DSS's electoral list for Čajetina in the 2008 Serbian local elections. The party won a majority victory with eighteen out of thirty-one seats, and incumbent DSS mayor Milan Stamatović was confirmed afterward for another term in office. In this election cycle, all assembly mandates were awarded to candidates on successful lists at the discretion of the sponsoring parties or coalitions, irrespective of numerical order; Božanić was not given an assembly mandate but was instead appointed as a mayor's assistant.

==== Parliamentarian (2012–2014) ====
Serbia's electoral laws were reformed in 2011, such that all mandates were awarded to candidates on successful lists in numerical order. Božanić received the twenty-first position on the DSS's electoral list in the 2012 Serbian parliamentary election and was elected when the list won exactly twenty-one mandates. The Serbian Progressive Party (SNS), the Socialist Party of Serbia (SPS), and other parties formed a coalition government after the election, and the DSS served in opposition. One of the youngest members in the assembly, Božanić was a member of the committee on human and minority rights and gender equality; a deputy member of the economy committee, (Note: Formally known as the Committee on the Economy, Regional Development, Trade, Tourism, and Energy.) the spatial planning committee, (Note: Formally known as the Committee on Spatial Planning, Transport, Infrastructure, and Telecommunications.) and the committee for environmental protection; and a member of the parliamentary friendship groups with France, Norway, and the United Kingdom. She was also a member of the informal green parliamentary group.

Božanić was also given the third position on the DSS's list for Čajetina in the 2012 local elections, which took place concurrently with the parliamentary vote, and was elected when the list won a majority victory with sixteen seats. Milan Stamatović was chosen for another term as mayor, and Božanić appears to have resigned her local assembly seat soon after the election to serve another term as a mayor's assistant.

Božanić was promoted to the twelfth position on the DSS list in the 2014 parliamentary election. On this occasion, the list did not cross the electoral threshold for assembly representation.

=== Serbian People's Party ===
The DSS experienced a split in 2014, and both Stamanović and Božanić became founding members of a breakaway group called the Serbian People's Party (SNP). In early 2016, Božanić resigned as assistant to the mayor and was appointed as director of a new public company called Gold Gondola Zlatibor.

The SNP, DSS, and Party of United Pensioners of Serbia (PUPS) ran a combined electoral list in Čajetina in the 2016 local elections. Božanić received the third position on their list and was again elected when the alliance won twenty-one mandates. She resigned her seat on 9 May 2016 to continue as director of Gold Gondola Zlatibor.

=== Healthy Serbia ===
In 2017, Milan Stamanović left the SNP to form a new political party called Healthy Serbia (ZS). Božanić joined the party and was chosen as one of its inaugural vice-presidents. ZS and the DSS ran a combined list in Čajetina for the 2020 local elections; Božanić appeared in the fourth position and was elected for a third term when the list won twenty seats. She once again appears to have resigned soon after the election, and on 1 October 2020 she was appointed to a new four-year team as director of Gold Gondola Zlatibor. She also served afterward as president of Čajetina's council for gender equality.

Healthy Serbia contested the 2020 parliamentary election in an alliance with Better Serbia (BS), and Božanić received the fourth position on their combined list. The party later contested the 2022 parliamentary election on the list of the Sovereignists coalition, and Božanić appeared in the eleventh position. In both cases, the list failed to cross the electoral threshold.

She is currently seeking re-election to the Čajetina municipal assembly in the 2024 Serbian local elections, appearing in the fourth position on Healthy Serbia's coalition list.
