= Snežana Đenić =

Serbian historian

Snežana Đenić (Serbian Cyrillic: Снежана Ђенић; born 12 April 1962) is a Serbian historian. She has written several works on the local history of Užice and the Zlatibor region.

== Early life and career ==
Đenić was born in Čajetina, in what was then the People's Republic of Serbia in the Federal People's Republic of Yugoslavia. She graduated from the University of Belgrade Faculty of Philosophy with a degree in history.

== Historian ==
As of 2016, Đenić had written eleven books on Užice and Zlatibor, as well as overseeing more than thirty television programs on the history of the region. She has been the director of the Ljubiša R. Đenić library in Čajetina (named after her grandfather) since 2005.

Đenić has been awarded the prestigious Zlatna Značka (English: Golden Badge) by the Cultural and Educational Association of Serbia and the Office of the Government of Serbia for Co-operation with the Diaspora and Serbs in the region, which operates within the ministry of culture and information.

== Political activities ==
Đenić appeared in the fifth position on a combined electoral list of Healthy Serbia (ZS) and Better Serbia (BS) in the 2020 Serbian parliamentary election, seemingly as a non-party candidate. The list did not cross the electoral threshold to win representation in the national assembly.

== Books ==
- Zlatibor iz starog albuma, Zlatibor 1994.
- Zlatibor-turistički vodič, Zlatibor 2001.
- Srpski vladari u užičkom kraju, Čajetina 2007.
- Armijski đeneral Krsta Smiljanić, Čajetina 2008.
- Zlatibor - kulturna i istorijska baština od praistorije do danas, Čajetina 2009.
- Užički gorski car - Hajduk Nikola Jevđović, Beograd i Čajetina 2012.
- Prota Radosav Simić - srpski duhovnik, neimar i dobrotvor, Čajetina 2012.
- Svetlopisom kroz prvu srpsku vazdušnu banju, Čajetina 2013.
- Đeneral Krsta Smiljanić - hronika jednog viteškog života, Čajetina 2014.
- Rujanski starešina Jovan Mićić - od hajduka do serdara, od serdara do zatočenika Gurgusovačke kule, Čajetina 2015.
- Godine našeg milosrđa, Užice 2016
