= Ivan Stijepović =

Serbian politician

Ivan Stijepović (Serbian Cyrillic: Иван Стијеповић; born 1983) is a Serbian politician. He served in the Vojvodina provincial assembly from 2016 to 2020, originally as a member of the Enough Is Enough (DJB) movement and later as an independent delegate. He is now a member of the Sremski Karlovci municipal assembly, where he leads the Karlovac List.

== Early life and career ==
Stijepović was born in Novi Sad, in what was then the Socialist Autonomous Province of Vojvodina in the Socialist Republic of Serbia, Socialist Federal Republic of Yugoslavia. He attended primary school in Sremski Karlovci and grammar school in Novi Sad. Stijepović enrolled in the University of Novi Sad Faculty of Technology in 2002, graduated in 2007, and earned a Ph.D. in 2012. He holds the title of Doctor of Technical Engineering and has published widely in his field.

== Politician ==
Stijepović joined the Enough Is Enough movement in its early years, when it was considered liberal and reformist. He appeared in the third position on the movement's electoral list for the 2016 Vojvodina provincial election and was elected when the list won seven mandates. The Serbian Progressive Party (SNS) and its allies won a majority victory, and the DJB delegates served in opposition. Stijepović also appeared in the forty-seventh position on DJB's electoral list in the concurrent 2016 Serbian parliamentary election and was not elected when the list won sixteen seats.

When the provincial assembly convened on 2 June 2016, Stijepović was chosen as one of its vice-presidents (i.e., deputy speakers).

The leadership of DJB expelled several members, including Stijepović, in early 2018, on the grounds that they had transgressed the party's policies. The expelled members, in turn, accused party leader Saša Radulović of trying to set the groundwork to "carry out a coup in the party." Stipejović served as an independent member of the provincial assembly after this time. Shortly after the expulsions, DJB shifted to the radical right.

Stipejović was not a candidate in the 2020 provincial election but instead led the independent Karlovac List in Sremski Karlovci for the 2020 Serbian local elections and was elected when the list won three mandates. The SNS and its allies won a majority victory; both of the other Karlovac List delegates elected in 2020 later defected to the SNS, and Stipejović was for a time the movement's sole elected representative. In October 2023, he brought the Karlovac List into an alliance with the liberal Movement of Free Citizens (PSG).

He again led the Karlovac List in Sremski Karlovci for the 2024 Serbian local elections and was re-elected when the list won seven seats, finishing second against the SNS.
