= Elections in Serbia =

Elections in Serbia are mandated by the Constitution and legislation. The President of the Republic, National Assembly, provincial (Vojvodina) and local (municipalities and cities) assemblies are all elective offices. Since 1990, twelve presidential, fourteen parliamentary and ten provincial elections were held.

== Electoral procedures ==
Any Serbian citizen over age 18 may be a candidate in presidential, parliamentary, provincial or local elections, provided that a sufficient number of endorsements by Serbian voters is obtained beforehand. At least five days before the election, citizens are notified about the election, receive information about the day and time of the election, and the address of the polling station where they could vote. Voting takes place in polling stations in Serbia and abroad, monitored by an electoral board and observers at each station. During the election day, registered voters could vote from 07:00 (UTC+01:00) to 20:00, though if the polling station is opened later than 07:00, voting is then extended by the amount of time for which the opening of the polling station was delayed. Ballots consist of an election list with ordinal numbers (which are circled to indicate a vote). All votes are counted by hand by the members of polling boards. Depending on the type of the elections, national, provincial or local electoral commission publishes official results and handles complaints. Decisions of the electoral commissions may be appealed at the Constitutional Court.

== Presidential elections ==
The President of the Republic is elected for a five-year term by a direct vote of all citizens in a majority system, requiring runoff elections if no candidate wins more than 50 percent of votes in the first round.

Candidate	Party	Votes	%
Aleksandar Vučić	Serbian Progressive Party	2,224,914	60.01
Zdravko Ponoš	United for the Victory of Serbia	698,538	18.84
Miloš Jovanović	National Democratic Alternative	226,137	6.10
Boško Obradović	Dveri–POKS	165,181	4.46
Milica Đurđević Stamenkovski	Serbian Party Oathkeepers	160,553	4.33
Biljana Stojković	We Must	122,378	3.30
Branka Stamenković	Sovereignists	77,031	2.08
Miša Vacić	Serbian Right	32,947	0.89
Total		3,707,679	100.00
Valid votes		3,707,679	97.63
Invalid/blank votes		89,933	2.37
Total votes		3,797,612	100.00
Registered voters/turnout		6,502,307	58.62
Source: Republic Electoral Commission

== Parliamentary elections ==
The 250 members of the National Assembly are elected for four-year terms through closed-list proportional representation in a single nationwide constituency.

Eligible voters cast their ballots for electoral lists submitted by registered political parties, coalitions of political parties, or groups of citizens. Each electoral list may contain up to 250 candidates. To register a list, at least 10,000 valid voter signatures must be collected, although lists representing national minorities require only 5,000 signatures. At least 40% of the candidates on each electoral list must belong to the less-represented gender, with at least two candidates of each gender among every five consecutive candidates.

Seats are allocated using the D'Hondt method, with an electoral threshold of 3% of all votes cast. Lists representing national minorities are exempt from the threshold, and their quotients are increased by 35% when they receive less than 3% of the vote. Seats are awarded to candidates according to their order on each electoral list, beginning with the first candidate.

Early elections may be held before the expiration of the four-year parliamentary term. The most recent parliamentary election was held on 25 October 2026, with repeat voting at 53 polling stations on 1 November. The Student List won an absolute majority, ending the parliamentary majority of the Serbian Progressive Party-led coalition.

Diagram of the National Assembly
Electoral list	Votes	%	Seats	+/–
Student List	2,354,417	53.69	140	New
Aleksandar Vučić – United Serbia	1,731,323	39.48	103	–26
Ivica Dačić – Factor of Stability!	94,766	2.16	0	–18
Authentic Right	39,503	0.90	0	–13
Alliance of Vojvodina Hungarians	35,461	0.81	2	–4
Albanian Coalition	27,683	0.63	2	+1
Humane (SDP–CDP)	20,638	0.47	1	New
Strength of Serbia Movement	20,045	0.46	0	0
SDAS	12,596	0.29	1	–1
European Serbia	12,570	0.29	0	–20
Movement for Unification	12,440	0.28	1	–1
Russian Party	6,503	0.15	0	–1
Russian–Serbian Unity Party	4,286	0.10	0	New
Alternative for Serbia	3,705	0.08	0	0
Mother Serbia – Gruda	3,234	0.07	0	New
Liberal-Green Party	2,686	0.06	0	New
Pa, This is for You	2,022	0.05	0	New
Force Coalition	1,187	0.03	0	0
Total	4,385,065	100.00	250	0
Valid votes	4,385,065	98.73		
Invalid/blank votes	56,571	1.27		
Total votes	4,441,636	100.00		
Registered voters/turnout	6,451,292	68.85		
Source: Republic Electoral Commission

== Provincial elections ==
The deputies for the Assembly of Vojvodina are elected for a four-year term by closed-list proportional representation from a single province-wide constituency.

Eligible voters vote for electoral lists, on which the registered candidates are present. A maximum of 120 candidates could be present on a single electoral list. An electoral list could be only submitted by a registered political party. To submit an electoral list, at least 4,000 valid signatures must be collected, though ethnic minority parties only need to collect 2,000 signature to qualify on ballot. At least 40 percent of candidates on electoral lists must be female. The electoral list is submitted by its chosen ballot representative. An electoral list could be declined, after which those who had submitted can fix the deficiencies in a span of 48 hours, or rejected, if the person is not authorised to nominate candidates. The name and date of the election, names of the electoral lists and its ballot representatives, and information on how to vote are only present on the voting ballot.

Seats are allocated using the d'Hondt method with an electoral threshold of 3 percent of all votes cast, although the threshold is waived for ethnic minority parties. Seats are awarded to candidates from electoral lists according to their order, starting with the first candidate from an electoral list.

It is possible for a snap election to take place.

Electoral list	Votes	%	+/–	Seats	+/–
Vojvodina Must Not Stop	466,035	48.82	–12.76	66	–10
Serbia Against Violence	215,197	22.55	New	30	New
Alliance of Vojvodina Hungarians	63,721	6.68	–2.61	9	–3
National Democratic Alternative	50,582	5.30	–3.29	7	–3
SPS–JS–ZS	49,775	5.21	–5.97	7	–4
LSV–VMDK–ZZV	24,625	2.58	–2.54	0	–6
National Gathering	22,487	2.36	New	0	New
Serbian Radical Party	21,135	2.21	–1.06	0	–4
Good Morning Serbia	14,715	1.54	New	0	New
Russian Party	9,907	1.04	New	1	New
People's Party	8,140	0.85	New	0	New
SPP–DSHV	4,979	0.52	–0.14	0	–
Vojvodina Must Be Different	3,221	0.34	–0.24	0	–
Total	954,519	100.00	–	120	0
Valid votes	954,519	96.91			
Invalid/blank votes	30,444	3.09			
Total votes	984,963	100.00			
Registered voters/turnout	1,669,791	58.99			
Source: Provincial Electoral Commission

== Local elections ==
All local elections in Serbia are held under proportional representation. Mayors are not directly elected but are instead chosen by elected members of the local assemblies (city/municipality assembly). The electoral threshold for assembly representation is three per cent (of all votes, not only of valid votes), although parties representing national minority communities are exempt from this requirement.

== See also ==
- Electoral calendar
- Electoral system
- Elections in Yugoslavia
