= Nenad Božić =

Serbian politician

Nenad Božić (Serbian Cyrillic: Ненад Божић; born 1971) is a Serbian politician. He has served in the National Assembly of Serbia since 2016. Božić was elected to the assembly as a member of the anti-establishment and reformist It's Enough – Restart (Dosta je bilo, DJB) association, better known in English by the name "Enough Is Enough." He was expelled from the association by its main board on March 29, 2018, in the context of a disagreement with its leader, Saša Radulović. He is now a member of the Party of Modern Serbia.

== Early life and career ==
Božić was born and raised in Smederevska Palanka, then part of the Socialist Republic of Serbia in the Socialist Federal Republic of Yugoslavia. He received a bachelor of mechanical engineering degree in Belgrade (1987), worked in Slovenia and Germany from 2000 to 2004, and returned to Serbia to operate a design office in Kragujevac. He was not politically active before joining the "It's Enough – Restart" movement.

== Parliamentarian ==
Božić received the twenty-third position on the It's enough – Restart electoral list in the 2014 Serbian parliamentary election. The list did not cross the electoral threshold to win representation in the assembly.

He was promoted to the twelfth position on the association's list in the 2016 parliamentary election and was this time elected when the list won sixteen mandates. He served with It's Enough – Restart until his expulsion from the movement in March 2018. He subsequently joined with four other former members of It's Enough – Restart to start a new association called the Free MPs parliamentary group.

All members of the Free MPs parliamentary group also joined a new political group called the Movement of the Center. In December 2018, this group merged with the Social Democratic Union to create the Party of Modern Serbia. Božić now serves as a member of this party.

Božić serves as an opposition deputy. Before leaving DJB, he was a member of the parliamentary committee on agriculture, forestry, and water management and a deputy member of the committee on defence and internal affairs. He is now a member of the parliamentary friendship groups with Austria, Croatia, France, Germany, Greece, Italy, Montenegro, the Netherlands, Slovenia, and Switzerland.
