= Vladimir Đurić =

Serbian politician (born 1970)

Vladimir Đurić (Serbian Cyrillic: Владимир Ђурић; born May 18, 1970) is a Serbian politician. He has served in the National Assembly of Serbia since 2016. Đurić was elected to the assembly as a member of the anti-establishment and reformist It's Enough – Restart (Dosta je bilo, DJB) association, better known in English by the name "Enough Is Enough." He was expelled from the association by its main board on 29 March 2018 in the context of a disagreement with its leader, Saša Radulović, and now serves as a member of the Party of Modern Serbia.

== Early life and career ==
Đurić was born in Frankfurt am Main in the Federal Republic of Germany. He was educated in Novi Sad, Vojvodina, then part of the Socialist Republic of Serbia in the Socialist Federal Republic of Yugoslavia, and attained a bachelor's degree in mechanical engineering. He works in insurance in private life.

== Political career ==
Đurić received the tenth position on the DJB electoral list for the 2016 Serbian parliamentary election and was elected when the list won sixteen mandates. The election was won by the Serbian Progressive Party and its allies, and Đurić served with It's Enough – Restart in opposition until his expulsion from the movement in March 2018. He subsequently joined with four other former DJB members to start a new association called the Free MPs parliamentary group, of which he is currently deputy leader.

All members of the Free MPs parliamentary group also joined a new political group called the Movement of the Center. In December 2018, this group merged with the Social Democratic Union to create the Party of Modern Serbia. Đurić is now a member of this party.

Đurić sits as a member of the opposition. Before leaving DJB, he was a member of the parliamentary committee on the Serbian diaspora and Serbs in the region and a deputy member of four other committees. He is now a deputy member of the European Union–Serbia stabilization and association parliamentary committee and a member of the parliamentary friendship groups for Germany, Italy, the United Kingdom, and the United States of America.
