= Zeta Banovina =

Province in Yugoslavia between 1929–1941

Coordinates: 42°22′48″N 18°55′12″E

Zetska Banovina Zetska banovina Зетска бановина
- Banovina of the Kingdom of Yugoslavia
- 1929–1941
- Flag Coat of arms

- Location of Zeta Banovina (red) within the Kingdom of Yugoslavia (light yellow)
- Capital: Cetinje
- Area
  - 1931: 30,997 km^{2} (11,968 sq mi)
- Population
  - 1931: 925,516
- Government
  - Type: Devolved autonomous banate
- Monarch
  - 1929–1934: Alexander I
  - 1934–1941: Peter II
- Ban of Zeta
  - 1929-1931: Krsta Smiljanić (first)
  - 1941: Blažo Đukanović (last)
- Historical era: Interwar period
  - Established: 3 October 1929
  - 1931 Yugoslav Constitution: 3 September 1931
  - Invasion of Yugoslavia: 17 April 1941
Succeeded by
| Banovina of Croatia |
| Governorate of Montenegro |
| Independent State of Croatia |
| German-occupied Serbia |
| Kingdom of Albania |
- Today part of: Montenegro; Kosovo; Bosnia and Herzegovina; Serbia; Croatia

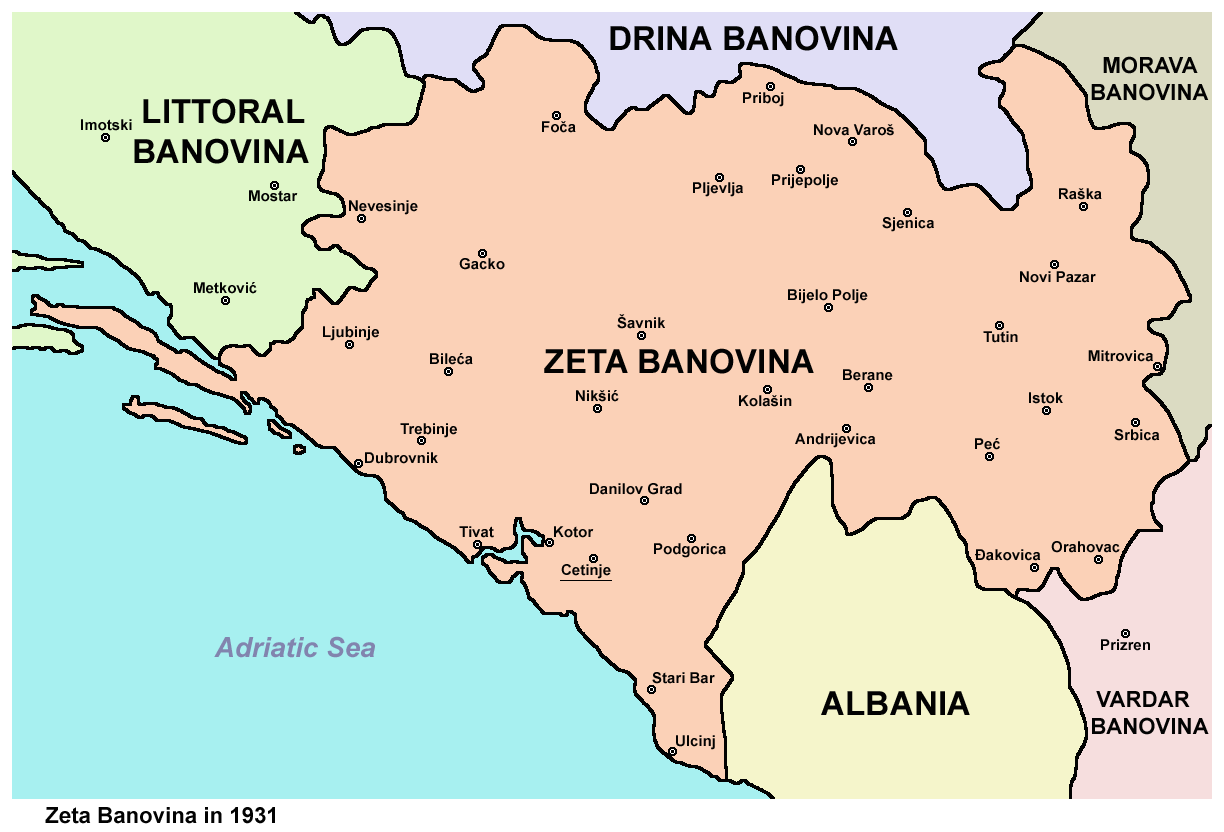
Map of Zeta Banovina

The Zeta Banovina (Serbo-Croatian: Zetska banovina / Зетска бановина), was a province (banovina) of the Kingdom of Yugoslavia between 1929 and 1941. This province consisted of all of present-day Montenegro as well as adjacent parts of Central Serbia, Croatia, Kosovo, and Bosnia and Herzegovina. It was named after the Zeta River which also gave its name to the medieval state of Zeta that roughly corresponds to modern-day Montenegro. The capital of Banovina was Cetinje.

== Borders ==
According to the 1931 Constitution of the Kingdom of Yugoslavia,

The Zeta Banovina is bounded on the north by the southern boundaries of the Littoral and Drina Banovinas ... as far as the intersection of the boundaries of the three districts of Dragačevo, Žiča and Studenica. From this point and as far as the national frontier with Albania, the boundary of this Banovina follows the eastern boundaries of the districts of Studenica, Deževa, Mitrovica, Drenica and Drin, including all these districts. Then the boundary coincides, up to the Adriatic Sea, with the Yugoslav-Albanian State frontier.

== History ==
In 1939, predominantly Catholic areas of the Zeta Banovina from the Konavle to Pelješac including Dubrovnik were merged with a new Banovina of Croatia.

=== World War II ===
In 1941, the World War II Axis powers occupied the remaining area of the Zeta Banovina. A small area around the Gulf of Kotor was annexed by Fascist Italy while much of the rest was joined with Italian-occupied Montenegro and Albania. Eastern areas were made part of German-occupied Serbia and western areas part of Independent State of Croatia.

Following World War II, the region was divided between Montenegro, Bosnia and Herzegovina, Serbia, and Croatia within a federal Socialist Yugoslavia.

== Demographics ==
According to the 1931 census, the Zeta Banovina had a population of 925,516 and an area of 30,997 km^{2}.

== Cities and towns ==
- Cetinje (capital)
- Andrijevica
- Berane
- Bijelo Polje
- Bileća
- Danilovgrad
- Dubrovnik (1939 to the Banovina of Croatia)
- Gjakova
- Foča
- Gacko
- Istok
- Kolašin
- Kotor
- Ljubinje
- Mitrovica
- Nevesinje
- Nikšić
- Nova Varoš
- Novi Pazar
- Rahovec
- Peja
- Pljevlja
- Podgorica
- Priboj
- Prijepolje
- Raška
- Sjenica
- Skenderaj
- Stari Bar
- Šavnik
- Tivat
- Trebinje
- Tutin
- Ulcinj

== List of Bans of Zeta ==
| Name | | Term of office | | | Born | Party affiliation | Monarch |
| Name | | Start | End | Time in office | Born | Party affiliation | Monarch |
|---|---|---|---|---|---|---|---|
| 1 | Krsta Smiljanić | 9 October 1929 | 10 January 1931 | 1 year, 93 days | (Kingdom of Serbia) Ljubiš (now Serbia) | Military | Alexander I (1929–1934) |
| 2 | Uroš Krulj | 10 January 1931 | 3 July 1932 | 1 year, 176 days | (Ottoman Empire) Mostar (now Bosnia-Herzegovina) | JRSD | Alexander I (1929–1934) |
| 3 | Aleksa Stanišić | 3 July 1932 | 23 April 1934 | 1 year, 293 days | (Ottoman Empire) Prijepolje (now Serbia) | JRSD | Alexander I (1929–1934) |
| 4 | Mujo Sočica | 23 April 1934 | 13 August 1936 | 2 years, 112 days | (Principality of Montenegro) Plužine (now Montenegro) | JRZ | Paul (1934–1941) |
| 5 | Petar Ivanišević | 13 August 1936 | 25 May 1939 | 2 years, 285 days | (Ottoman Empire) Trebinje (now Bosnia-Herzegovina) | JRZ | Paul (1934–1941) |
| 6 | Božidar Krstić | 25 May 1939 | 1 April 1941 | 1 year, 306 days | (Kingdom of Serbia) Jagodina (now Serbia) | JRZ | Paul (1934–1941) |
| 7 | Blažo Đukanović | 1 April 1941 | 17 April 1941 | 21 days | (Principality of Montenegro) Nikšić (now Montenegro) | Military | Peter II (1941) |

== See also ==
- Zeta Oblast (1919-1929)
- Zeta (medieval principality)
- Montenegro (sovereign state)
- Administrative divisions of Yugoslavia
