= Bratislav Jugović =

Serbian politician

Bratislav Jugović (Serbian Cyrillic: Братислав Југовић; born 9 February 1980) is a politician in Serbia. He has served in the municipal government of Čačak and was elected to the National Assembly of Serbia in the 2020 parliamentary election. At one time a leading member of the Movement of Socialists (Pokret socijalista, PS), Jugović is now a member of the Serbian Progressive Party (Srpska napredna stranka, SNS).

== Early life and career ==
Jugović was born in Čačak, in what was then the Socialist Republic of Serbia in the Socialist Federal Republic of Yugoslavia. He was raised in that city, received a degree from the University of Novi Sad Faculty of Physical Education, and returned to Čačak to work as a preschool instructor.

== Politician ==
=== Municipal politics ===
The PS formed an alliance with the SNS at the republic level for the 2012 Serbian parliamentary election, and the party also appeared on the SNS's electoral lists in several cities, including Čačak, in the concurrent 2012 local elections. Jugović received the seventh position on the SNS list for the Čačak city assembly as a PS candidate and was elected when the list won thirteen mandates. Both the SNS and the PS subsequently participated in the city's coalition government, and Jugović was appointed to the city council (i.e., the executive branch of the government) with responsibility for youth and culture. He served in this role from 2012 to 2016.

Jugović was the director and vice-president of the PS at different times during this period. He spoke highly of SYRIZA leader Alexis Tsipras after the latter's victory in the January 2015 Greek legislative election, describing him as the leader of the "true left" in Europe.

=== 2017 presidential election and after ===
Jugović was a candidate in the 2017 Serbian presidential election, although he was not endorsed by the PS and in fact resigned all of his positions in the party before declaring his candidacy. He said that he did not want to create difficulties for the party, which he recognized was certain to endorse the SNS candidate. He withdrew before election day and endorsed rival candidate Milan Stamatović.

He left the PS in 2019, saying that he disagreed with party leader Aleksandar Vulin's intention to go on a hunger strike while serving as Serbia's minister of defence. He joined the SNS, becoming a member of its main board. In an interview explaining his decision, he said that he still considered himself to be a leftist, even though the SNS is generally situated as a party of the right. He also remarked that he was disappointed by Alexis Tsipras's record in office as prime minister of Greece.

As an SNS member, Jugović has been a vocal critic of opposition politicians who support a boycott of state institutions. He has been an especially strong critic of Dveri leader Boško Obradović, a fellow resident of Čačak.

=== Member of the National Assembly ===
Jugović received the 135th position on the Progressive Party's Aleksandar Vučić — For Our Children coalition list in the 2020 Serbian parliamentary election and was elected to the assembly when the list won a landslide majority with 188 out of 250 mandates. He is a member of the assembly committee on education, science, technological development, and the information society; a deputy member of the committee on constitutional and legislative issues and the committee on the judiciary, public administration, and local self-government; a member of the sub-committee on youth and spots; and a member of the parliamentary friendship groups with Greece, Israel, and the United States of America.
