= Ivana Stamatović =

Serbian politician

- Ивана Стаматовић

Member of the National Assembly
- Incumbent
- Assumed office 6 February 2024

Personal details
- Born: 1991 (age 34–35)
- Party: ZS
- Parent: Milan Stamatović
- Occupation: Politician; architect

Ivana Stamatović (Serbian Cyrillic: Ивана Стаматовић; born 1991) is a Serbian politician serving as a member of the National Assembly since 6 February 2024. She is a member of the Healthy Serbia (ZS) and the daughter of ZS's leader Milan Stamatović.

== Biography ==
Stamatović was born in 1991. Her father Milan Stamatović has been the mayor of Čajetina since 2004. By profession, she is an architect and resides in Čajetina.

== Political career ==
Stamatović received the 14th position on the Healty Serbia (ZS)-Better Serbia (BS) electoral list in the 2020 parliamentary election but she failed to get elected to the National Assembly. She received the 68th position on the Serbian Progressive Party (SNS)-led Serbia Must Not Stop electoral list and was elected to the National Assembly. She was sworn in as MP on 6 February 2024.
