= Ljubiša Preletačević =

Serbian comedian and political activist (born 1991)

- Љубиша Прелетачевић
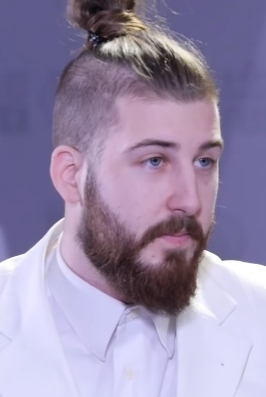
- Born: Luka Maksimović; 17 July 1991 (age 34); Belgrade, SR Serbia, SFR Yugoslavia
- Other name: Beli
- Occupations: Student, political activist
- Website: https://belipreletacevic.com

Luka Maksimović (Serbian Cyrillic: Лука Максимовић, pronounced [lûːka maksǐːmoʋit͜ɕ]; (Note: Maksimović in Serbian can also be pronounced [mâksimoʋit͜ɕ], but the pronunciation listed here first is the most usual in Serbia) born 17 July 1991) is a Serbian comedian and political activist best known for his role as the satirical fictional politician named Ljubiša "Beli" Preletačević (Serbian Cyrillic: Љубиша Прелетачевић "Бели", pronounced [ʎǔbiʃa preletǎːt͡ʃeʋit͜ɕ bêːliː]). He was the leader of a parody political party Sarmu probo nisi (SPN) formed in Mladenovac in 2016, which participated in the 2016 local council election in the municipality of Mladenovac, winning 20% of the votes and 12 seats. He participated in the 2017 Serbian presidential election under his Preletačević persona, finishing third with 9.44% of the votes. Preletačević left the party in 2018.

== Biography ==
Born in 1991 in Velika Ivanča, Mladenovac, Preletačević was a communicology student. The surname "Preletačević" is a humorous pun. The word preletač (lit. 'Defector') is used in Serbian language for a politician who switches political parties for personal gains.

== Political career ==
=== 2016 local elections ===
Sarmu probo nisi (SPN) started as a fictional political party created by a group of comedians from Mladenovac. They became popular after they filmed a humorous parody promotional video for their fictional leader "Ljubiša Preletačević Beli". After the video became popular on YouTube, they were persuaded by their followers to participate in the election. The group vowed to make a lot of false promises and false hope. The focal point of their campaign was the promise to open a euthanasia department for pensioners in the local hospital in order to spare the country of their expenses.

Local council elections were held in the most municipalities and cities in Serbia on 24 April 2016, together with the 2016 parliamentary election. Preletačević and his followers formed a parody political party called Sarmu probo nisi (SPN) and participated in the local election in the Municipality of Mladenovac. Because SPN is not officially registered as political party, they participated as an independent list called "Beli - Samo jako" (lit. 'Beli: Go hard!'). This list surprisingly won 20% of the votes and 12 seats, becoming the second strongest group in the local council of Mladenovac, behind only the ruling Serbian Progressive Party.

=== 2017 presidential election ===
Preletačević launched his campaign for the 2017 Serbian presidential election on 4 March 2017. He campaigns under his Preletačević persona with the political slogan "Samo jako!" (lit. 'Go hard!'). Saša Radulović, one of the Serbian parliamentary opposition leaders, supported his campaign, saying that his candidacy will contribute to the raise of the turnout in the first round of the elections, thus preventing the Prime Minister and ruling party presidential candidate Aleksandar Vučić from achieving more than 50 percent of the votes, and forcing the runoff; Preletačević also said that this is one of his main reasons for the candidacy.

On 11 March 2017, Preletačević announced that he collected 10,000 signatures of support needed for candidacy. On 13 March, national Electoral Commission officially declared his candidacy for the presidency. Despite running as a joke candidate, he finished the election in the third place, winning 326,055 or 9.44% of the votes cast.

==== Platform ====
The Beli platform was entirely humorous and tongue-in-cheek. Some prominent campaign promises included building a Serbian coastline and constructing hills in Pančevo so that residents could sled in the wintertime. Preletačević told voters that he would offer "three times as much" as the other candidates and supported universal employment, increased pensions for all people, and endorsed "uniting" the Balkans to become a superpower.

=== 2018 local elections ===
In early 2018, Preletačević announced that he would participate at the March 2018 local election for the Assembly of the City of Belgrade with new group of supporter, leaving Sarmu probo nisi (a.k.a. "Beli - samo jako" movement). Subsequently, the movement dissociated itself from Maksimović.

In the March local elections, Preletačević participated with an electoral list named "Ljubiša Preletačević Beli: Zato što volimo Belovgrad". Although there was nobody with that name at that time, electoral commission refused to approve his list without permission from a person whose name is used. After that, it was reported that that same day Preletačević's cousin, Ognjen Maksimović, legally changed his name to "Ljubiša Preletačević Beli" and gave written permission for his name to be used on the electoral list. Afterwards, electoral commission approved the list. Some political commentators and opponents criticized this unusually quick name changing procedure and accused Preletačević for secretly working for the ruling party. Preletačević dismissed those accusations and said that his cousin already filed a request for name change two weeks earlier.

== Entertainment career ==
In late 2025, Serbian singers who were given a chance to participate in Pesma za Evroviziju were announced. In the lineup of 24 artists, Preletačević was selected for PzE as a member of the group Kosmos Trip. Their song, "Sve je u redu" (lit. 'Everything is Fine') was later released in early 2026. Kosmos Trip performed in the first semifinal of PzE on 24 February 2026, where they won their semifinal with 18 points and advanced to the final. They went on to rank eighth place in the final with 5 points total.
