= Dragan Jovanović (Serbian politician, born 1972) =

Serbian politician

- Драган Јовановић
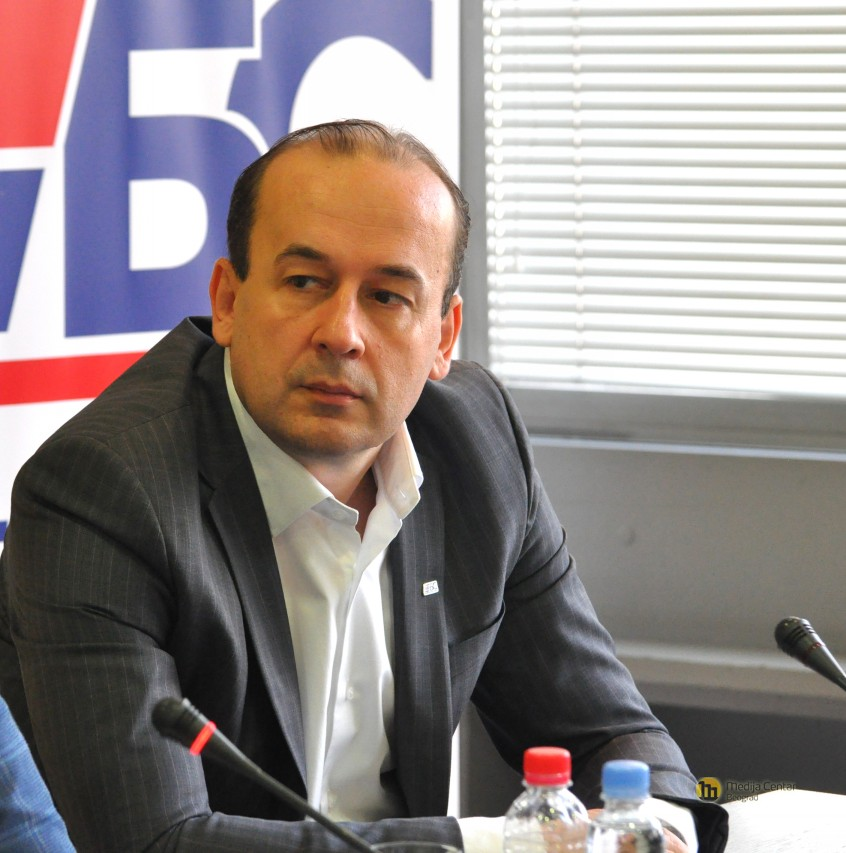

Member of the National Assembly of the Republic of Serbia
- Incumbent
- Assumed office 1 August 2022
- In office 16 April 2014 – 3 August 2020
- In office 11 June 2008 – 8 July 2008

Leader of Better Serbia
- In office 24 July 2017 – 13 April 2023
- Preceded by: position established
- Succeeded by: position abolished

Leader of the Topola Provisional Authority
- In office 31 October 2023 – 8 February 2024
- Preceded by: Vladimir Radojković (as mayor)
- Succeeded by: Vladimir Radojković (as mayor)

Mayor of Topola
- In office 2004 – 29 August 2014
- Preceded by: Miomir Tadić
- Succeeded by: Dragan Živanović

Personal details
- Born: 5 March 1972 (age 54) Aranđelovac, SR Serbia, SFR Yugoslavia
- Party: NS (until 2017); BS (2017–2023); SNS (2023–present)
- Occupation: Politician

Dragan Jovanović (Serbian Cyrillic: Драган Јовановић; born 5 March 1972) is a Serbian politician who was the mayor of Topola from 2004 to 2014 and is now serving his fifth term in Serbia's national assembly. A prominent member of New Serbia (NS) for many years, he founded Better Serbia (BS) in 2017 and was its leader until 2023, when it merged into the Serbian Progressive Party (SNS).

== Early life and career ==
Jovanović was born in Aranđelovac, in what was then the Socialist Republic of Serbia in the Socialist Federal Republic of Yugoslavia. He graduated from the Faculty of Mechanical Engineering with a major in industrial management.

== Politician ==
Jovanović was New Serbia's secretary-general from 2003 until 2005, when he was elected as a party vice-president. He oversaw party leader Velimir Ilić's campaign in the 2003 Serbian presidential election.

=== Mayor of Topola ===
Serbia introduced the direct election of mayors for the 2004 local elections, and Jovanović ran in Topola with a dual endorsement from New Serbia and the Democratic Party of Serbia (DSS). He was elected in the first round of voting, defeating seven other candidates. At thirty-two years old, he was the youngest mayor in Serbia. The NS–DSS alliance also won a convincing victory in the concurrent election for the Topola municipal assembly.

In December 2007, Jovanović and other members of New Serbia joined with the far-right Serbian Radical Party (SRS) to prevent the B92 program Peščanik from recording an episode at Aranđelovac's House of Culture; the protesters took control of the microphones and physically stopped the recording from taking place. This action received international attention, including a reference in the United States Department of State's Country Report on Human Rights Practices for 2007, which also indicated that Jovanović made threats against B92 in a subsequent interview. In the aftermath of this controversy, prominent New Serbia members accused B92 of pursuing an "anti-Serb and anti-Constitutional campaign." B92 responded that New Serbia's criticism was really motivated by its own frequent criticisms of Velimir Ilić.

The direct election of mayors proved to be a short-lived experiment and was abandoned with the 2008 local elections; since this time, Serbian mayors have been chosen by elected members of the local assemblies. The NS–DSS alliance won a majority victory in Topola in 2008, and Jovanović was chosen for a second term as mayor. In 2009, he joined with other Serbian politicians from across the political spectrum in accusing Croatian authorities of preventing Serbs originally from Croatia from participating in the 2009 Croatian local elections.

For the 2012 Serbian local elections, Jovanović led a local alliance of New Serbia, the DSS, and the Party of United Pensioners of Serbia (PUPS) in Topola. The alliance won an increased majority, and Jovanović was chosen afterward for a third mayoral term. He stood down from the role in 2014, as he could not hold a dual mandate as a parliamentarian and an executive member of the local government. He was instead chosen as president (i.e., speaker) of the municipal assembly.

=== New Serbia parliamentarian ===
New Serbia contested the 2003 Serbian parliamentary election in an alliance with the Serbian Renewal Movement (SPO), and Jovanović received the 201st position out of 250 on their combined list. The alliance won twenty-two seats, and he was not included in his party's assembly delegation. (From 2000 to 2011, mandates in Serbian parliamentary elections were awarded to sponsoring parties or coalitions rather than individual candidates, and it was common practice for the mandates to be assigned out of numerical order. Jovanović could have been given a seat despite his low position on the list, although ultimately he was not.) New Serbia later contested the 2007 parliamentary election in an alliance the DSS, and Jovanović appeared on their list in the twenty-seventh position. The alliance won forty-seven seats, and he was again not given a mandate.

The DSS and NS continued their alliance at the republic level into the 2008 Serbian parliamentary election. Jovanović received the eleventh position on the alliance's list and this time received a mandate when the list won thirty seats. His first term in the national assembly was brief. The overall results of the 2008 election were inconclusive, but the For a European Serbia (ZES) alliance eventually formed a coalition government with the Socialist Party of Serbia (SPS), and New Serbia served in opposition. Velimir Ilić, who had hitherto been a cabinet minister, lost his position in government. Jovanović resigned his seat on 8 July 2008 to allow Ilić to enter the assembly in his place.

Serbia's electoral system was reformed in 2011, such that all parliamentary mandates were assigned to candidates on successful lists in numerical order. New Serbia joined an alliance led by the Serbian Progressive Party (SNS) prior to the 2012 parliamentary election and continued the alliance through the elections of 2014 and 2016. Jovanović was not a candidate in 2012, but he received the ninety-eighth position on the SNS-led list in 2014 and was elected when the list won a landslide victory with 158 out of 250 seats. In his first full term, Jovanović was a member of the spatial planning committee, (Note: Formally known as the Committee on Spatial Planning, Transport, Infrastructure, and Telecommunications.) a deputy member of the economy committee (Note: Formally known as the Committee on Economy, Regional Development, Trade, Tourism, and Energy) and the agriculture committee, (Note: Formally known as the Committee on Agriculture, Forestry, and Water Management.) and a member of the parliamentary friendship groups with Azerbaijan, Belarus, the Czech Republic, France, Greece, Italy, Montenegro, the Republic of Macedonia (now North Macedonia), Russia, and the United Kingdom.

Jovanović was given the 107th position on the SNS-led list in 2016 and was elected to a third term when the list won another majority victory with 131 mandates. In the parliament that followed, he was a member of the spatial planning committee, a deputy member of the agriculture committee and the committee for environmental protection, and a member of the parliamentary friendship groups with Armenia, Belarus, Belgium, Croatia, France, Italy, the Republic of Macedonia, Montenegro, Romania, Russia, Turkey, and the United Kingdom.

He also received the lead position on a coalition list of the Progressives, New Serbia, and other parties for the 2016 Serbian local elections in Topola and was re-elected when the list won twenty-nine out of forty-one seats. He was chosen afterward for a new term as assembly speaker.

=== Independent parliamentarian ===
In January 2017, Velimir Ilić withdrew his support from Serbia's SNS-led administration. Jovanović, speaking as a party vice-president, said that Ilić was entitled to his personal opinions but that the party as a whole would continue to support the government. Ilić then expelled Jovanović from the party, claiming that he had disobeyed the decisions of the party leadership, had made false claims about a diploma, and was compromised because of his involvement in a 2012 car accident. Jovanović rejected these accusations and said that Ilić was really concerned about a possible leadership challenge.

At around the time that Jovanović was expelled from New Serbia, his fellow deputies Dubravka Filipovski and Mladen Grujić voluntarily left the party in order to continue supporting Serbia's SNS-led administration. Initially, all three ex-NS members served in the assembly as government supporters without any party affiliation.

=== Founding of Better Serbia ===
In June 2017, Jovanović joined forces with Miroslav Parović and Vladan Glišić to present a manifesto for a new right-wing political party. Jovanović said that the group would offer conservative Serb voters a third choice, distinct from the country's existing government and opposition blocs. Shortly after this meeting, he launched a new political party called Better Serbia with himself in the role of party president.

Better Serbia and Healthy Serbia (ZS) fielded a joint list in the 2020 Serbian parliamentary election, and Jovanović was included in the third position. He had withdrawn his support for Serbia's SNS-led government by this time, saying it had turned out to be worse than the administration that preceded it. The ZS–BS list did not cross the electoral threshold to win representation in the assembly.

=== 2020 local elections and after ===
Better Serbia fielded its own list in Topola for the 2020 local elections, and Jovanović appeared in the lead position. The list won a narrow victory over the Progressive Party's coalition, sixteen seats to fifteen, but the Progressives were able to form a new local government with the support of smaller parties, and Better Serbia initially served in opposition.

Jovanović was expelled from the Topola municipal assembly in November 2020 on the grounds that he had changed his residence from Topola to Belgrade and was no longer on the local voters list. Jovanović said that his expulsion was based on falsified information and that he had actually been removed from the assembly for being a "thorn in the side" of the local authorities.

The defection of two SNS delegates in April 2021 allowed Better Serbia to form a new municipal administration. Jovanović did not return to the mayor's office but was instead named as a member of the municipal council (i.e., the executive branch of the municipal government) with responsibility for infrastructure and the economy.

=== Return to the national assembly ===
Notwithstanding the recent hostility between Better Serbia and the Progressive Party, Jovanović announced in February 2022 that the parties had established an alliance and that Better Serbia would contest the 2022 Serbian parliamentary election on the SNS list. He appeared in the sixty-third position and was elected to a fourth term when the list won a plurality victory with 120 seats; formally, his endorsement was from the SNS. The Progressives remained the dominant power in Serbia's coalition government after the election, and Jovanović served as a government supporter. In the 2022–24 parliament, he was a member of the spatial planning committee and the agriculture committee, a deputy member of the judiciary committee (Note: Formally known as the Committee on the Judiciary, Public Administration, and Local Self-Government.) and the finance committee, (Note: Formally known as the Committee on Finance, State Budget, and Control of Public Spending.) the leader of Serbia's parliamentary friendship group with Namibia, and a member of the friendship groups with Albania, Austria, Belgium, Bosnia and Herzegovina, Croatia, Cuba, Cyprus, the Czech Republic, Germany, Greece, Hungary, Italy, Japan, Montenegro, Slovakia, Slovenia, Spain, Ukraine, and the United Kingdom. By virtue of once again serving in the national assembly, he stood down from the Topola municipal council on 10 September 2022.

Better Serbia merged into the SNS on 13 April 2023, and Jovanović became a SNS member at this time.

The Topola municipal assembly was dissolved in late 2023, and Jovanović was appointed as the leader of a provisional administration. He appeared in the lead position on the SNS's list for Topola in the 2023 Serbian local elections and was re-elected when the list won twenty out of forty-one seats. The SNS formed a local coalition government with the Socialist Party of Serbia after the election, and Jovanović was once again chosen as assembly speaker.

Jovanović also received the ninety-first position on the SNS's list in the 2023 parliamentary election and was re-elected to the national assembly when the list won a majority victory with 129 seats. He is now a member of the agriculture committee and the spatial planning committee, a deputy member of the environmental protection committee, a deputy member of Serbia's delegation to the NATO parliamentary assembly (where Serbia has observer status), and a member of the friendship groups with Armenia, Austria, Belarus, Cuba, Cyprus, the Czech Republic, Germany, Greece, Hungary, India, Japan, Norway, Russia, the countries of Southeast Asia, (Note: Brunei Darussalam, Cambodia, Indonesia, Laos, Malaysia, Myanmar, the Philippines, Singapore, Thailand, and Vietnam.) Spain, Sweden, and the United Arab Emirates.

== Electoral record ==
=== Local (Topola) ===
2004 Municipality of Topola local election: Mayor of Topola
Candidate	Party	Votes	%
Dragan Jovanović	New Serbia–Democratic Party of Serbia (Affiliation: New Serbia)	5,334	56.04
all other candidates (combined total)		4,185	43.96
Dušan Mladenović	Serbian Radical Party		
Total		9,519	100.00
