= Branislav Mihajlović (politician) =

Serbian politician

Branislav Mihajlović (Serbian Cyrillic: Бранислав Михајловић; born 1953) is a politician in Serbia. He has served in the National Assembly of Serbia since 2016. Mihajlović was initially a member of the It's Enough – Restart (Dosta je bilo, DJB) association, better known in English by the name "Enough Is Enough," of which he was the leader from April to November 2018. Since November 2018, he has served in the assembly as an independent.

== Private career ==
Born into a mining family, Mihajlović has a doctorate in technical science and worked for thirty-nine years at RTB Bor, where he was a manager and oversaw planning and production analysis. He was dismissed from the company in 2015 after making a series of critical posts about its ownership on social media; after receiving a notice of termination, he sarcastically thanked his former employers for demonstrating that he and they had nothing in common. The DJB group charged that the company had targeted Mihajlović for dismissal on political grounds. Mihajlović continues to reside in Bor.

== Political career ==
Mihajlović received the sixth position on the It's enough – Restart electoral list in the 2016 parliamentary election and was elected when the list won sixteen mandates. The election was won by the Serbian Progressive Party and its allies, and Mihajlović serves as a member of the opposition. He is a member of the assembly committee on the economy, regional development, trade, tourism, and energy; a member of the agriculture, forestry, and water management committee; deputy member of the security services control committee; a deputy member of the culture and information committee; a member of Serbia's delegation to the South-East European Cooperation Process Parliamentary Assembly; and a member of the parliamentary friendship groups with Iran and Kazakhstan.

Mihajlović was chosen as the leader of It's Enough – Restart on April 21, 2018, after the resignation of Saša Radulović. He won the contest without opposition; Tatjana Macura, the only other candidate, had previously withdrawn.

He resigned from DJB's parliamentary group in November 2018 and initially intended to serve in a new group with four other former DJB members. Three members of this group subsequently resigned from the assembly, however, leaving the two remaining delegates below the threshold for official recognition. Mihajlović later said that the members who had resigned did so to prevent the DJB leadership from launching serious personal attacks against them; he added that he did not begrudge them their decisions.

Mihajlović initially sought to remain as DJB leader after leaving its assembly group, but he was dismissed by a vote of its main board. On 25 March 2019, he joined the Independent MPs Club parliamentary group.
