= Krsta Smiljanić =

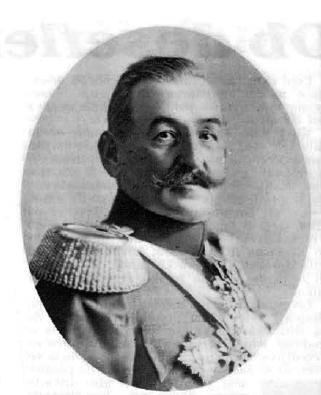
- Born: 29 December 1868; Ljubiš, Principality of Serbia
- Died: 14 May 1944 (aged 75); Belgrade, German-occupied Serbia
- Burial place: Belgrade New Cemetery
- Military career
- Allegiance: Royal Serbian Army; Royal Yugoslav Army
- Service years: 1892–1929
- Rank: Army general (Kingdom of Yugoslavia)
- Unit: Drina Division
- Conflicts: Balkan Wars; World War I
- Awards: Order of Karađorđe's Star; Order of the White Eagle (Serbia); Order of St. Sava; Order of the Yugoslav Crown

1st Ban of Zeta Banovina
- In office 9 October 1929 – 10 January 1931
- Monarch: Alexander I
- Preceded by: Position created
- Succeeded by: Uroš Krulj

Krsta Smiljanić (Serbian Cyrillic: Крста Смиљанић; 29 December 1868 – 14 May 1944) was a Serbian Army general (Kingdom of Yugoslavia), ban of the Zeta Banovina, and a senator in the Kingdom of Yugoslavia.

== Biography ==
Smiljanić was born in the Serbian village of Ljubiš on 28 December 1868 to Milosav and Vidosava Smiljanić. After graduating from high school, he enrolled in the Serbian Military Academy, which he graduated from in 1896.

During the First Balkan War he served under Serbian Marshal Radomir Putnik. The Serbian politician Nikola Pašić sent Smiljanić to peace talks in Bucharest after the Second Balkan War.

During World War I, he was the commander of Drina Division. He also took part in the Serbian army's retreat through Albania.

After the First World War, he became the commander of the Third Army Oblast and was ban of the Zeta Banovina (modern-day Montenegro and regions of Metohija, Herzegovina, and Sandžak). He was made a Yugoslav senator by King Alexander I in 1932.

Until the beginning of World War II he lived in Belgrade, but when the war started he moved back to Ljubiš. The German occupying forces placed him under house arrest, where he died in May 1944.

== Sources ==
- Генерал Крста Смиљанић
- Новка Илић: Ћенерал Крста Смиљанић
- Напредовања у служби Крсте Смиљанића
