= Branka Stamenković =

Serbian politician

- Бранка Стаменковић
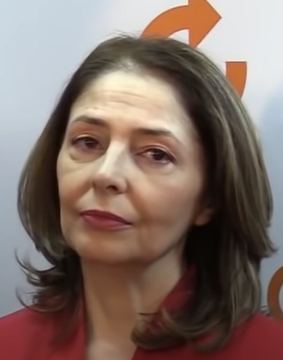
- Stamenković in 2020

Leader of Enough Is Enough (interim)
- In office 8 November 2018 – 19 October 2019
- Preceded by: Branislav Mihajlović
- Succeeded by: Saša Radulović

Member of the National Assembly of the Republic of Serbia
- In office 3 June 2016 – 3 August 2020

Member of the Parliamentary Assembly of the Council of Europe
- In office 1 January 2019 – 24 January 2021

Personal details
- Born: 1968 (age 57–58) Belgrade, SR Serbia, SFR Yugoslavia
- Party: DJB (2014–present)

Branka Stamenković (Serbian Cyrillic: Бранка Стаменковић; born 1968) is a Serbian politician. She served in the Serbian national assembly from 2016 to 2020 as a member of Enough Is Enough (DJB), which she led on an interim basis from November 2018 to October 2019. She was later the candidate of the DJB-led Sovereignists coalition in the 2022 Serbian presidential election.

== Early life and career ==
Stamenković was born in Belgrade, in what was then the Socialist Republic of Serbia in the Socialist Federal Republic of Yugoslavia. She is a professional translator in the fields of popular psychology and astrology and has herself worked as an astrologer. Her official biography indicates that she studied at the Sophia Centre for the Study of Cosmology in Culture and the University of Wales Trinity Saint David. Some aspects of her academic record have been questioned, including her claim that she took post-graduate studies at the latter institution.

After a traumatic experience giving birth to her first child in 2008, Stamenković launched the "Mother's Courage" initiative to improve conditions in Serbian maternity hospitals.

== Politician ==
Stamenković joined DJB on its founding in 2014, when the movement was generally considered as liberal and reformist. She received the tenth position on its electoral list in the 2014 Serbian parliamentary election and the eighth position on its list in the concurrent 2014 Belgrade City Assembly election. The movement did not cross the electoral threshold to win representation at either level.

=== Parliamentarian ===
Stamenković was given the thirteenth position on DJB's list in the 2016 parliamentary election and was elected when the list won sixteen seats. The Serbian Progressive Party (SNS) and its allies won the election, and DJB served in opposition. Following the election, Stamenković was a member of the administrative committee (Note: Formally known as the Committee on Administrative, Budgetary, Mandate, and Immunity Issues.) and the health and family committee, a deputy member of the committee on the rights of the child, and a member of the parliamentary friendship groups with Australia, Canada, the Czech Republic, Denmark, Norway, South Africa, Sweden, Turkey, the United Kingdom, and the United States of America.

She also received the fourth position on DJB's list for New Belgrade in the 2016 Serbian local elections, which were held concurrently with the parliamentary vote, and was elected to the municipal assembly when the list won five seats.

A number of DJB parliamentarians resigned to sit as independents between 2016 and 2018. The movement ran a combined electoral list with the hard-right party Dveri in the 2018 Belgrade City Assembly election, and Stamenković appeared in the twenty-seventh position. The list did not cross the electoral threshold. DJB itself shifted to the radical right after this election, leading to more resignations. By November 2018, Stamenković and former leader Saša Radulović were the movement's only remaining members in the assembly.

On 8 November 2018, DJB's main board dismissed Branislav Mihajlović as leader and named Stamenković to the role on an interim basis. She took on additional parliamentary responsibilities in this period, serving as a member of the labour committee, (Note: Formally known as the Committee on Labour, Social Affairs, Social Inclusion, and Poverty Reduction.) the committee for culture and information, and the committee for European integration; a deputy member of the committee for environmental protection and the committee on human and minority rights and gender equality; and a delegate to the parliamentary assembly of the Francophonie (where Serbia has associate status). Most of this was a short-term arrangement; while she retained her position in the Francophonie assembly, she was not listed as having any committee responsibilities by July 2019.

Stamenković was also appointed as one of Serbia's representatives to the Parliamentary Assembly of the Council of Europe (PACE) in late 2018 and formally took her seat in January 2019. She served as a member of the European Conservatives Group (renamed as the European Conservatives Group and Democratic Alliance in May 2019) and was a full member of the migration committee, (Note: Formally known as the Committee on Migration, Refugees, and Displaced Persons.) a full member of the sub-committees on diasporas and integration (which merged into a single committee in January 2020), a member of the PACE monitoring committee, and an alternate member of the committee on equality and non-discrimination.

Saša Radulović was widely considered to be DJB's de facto leader while Stamenković was interim president, and he was officially re-elected as leader on 19 October 2019. In standing down as leader, Stamenković said that she had sought to stabilize the movement over the previous year and had personally urged Radulović to run for the leadership again.

DJB contested the 2020 Serbian parliamentary election as the dominant party in the Sovereignists coalition. Stamenković appeared in the second position on its list, which did not cross the threshold for assembly representation. The coalition did not field a list in New Belgrade for the concurrent 2020 Serbian local elections, and she was not re-elected to the municipal assembly. Her term in the PACE ended in January 2021.

=== Presidential candidate ===
Stamenković was the candidate of the Sovereignists coalition in the 2022 Serbian presidential election. During the campaign, she highlighted the movement's opposition to membership in the European Union. She also argued for the abolition of health cards and objected to media descriptions of the DJB movement as anti-vaccination. She received about two per cent of the vote, finishing seventh in a field of eight candidates.

Concurrent with the presidential contest, she was given the third position on the Sovereignists list in the 2022 Serbian parliamentary election and the thirty-eighth position on its list in the 2022 Belgrade City Assembly election. The coalition did not cross the electoral threshold at either level.

=== Since 2022 ===
DJB contested the 2023 Serbian parliamentary election in an alliance with the Social Democratic Party (SDS), and Stamenković appeared in the fourth position on their combined list. She also appeared in the second position on the alliance's list in the concurrent Belgrade city assembly election. In the 2024 Serbian local elections, she received the second position on DJB's list for the Belgrade city assembly and the lead position on its list for the New Belgrade municipal assembly. In each instance, the list failed to cross the electoral threshold.

== Electoral record ==
=== Serbia ===
2022 Serbian presidential election
Candidate	Party	Votes	%
Aleksandar Vučić	Coalition: Aleksandar Vučić–Together We Can Do Everything, Serbian Progressive Party (SNS), Socialist Party of Serbia (SPS)–Ivica Dačić, Alliance of Vojvodina Hungarians (SVM-VMSZ)–István Pásztor	2,224,914	60.01
Zdravko Ponoš	Citizens' Group: For a United, Fair, and Stable Serbia	698,538	18.84
Miloš Jovanović	Coalition: For the Kingdom of Serbia–DSS	226,137	6.10
Boško Obradović	Coalition: Dveri–POKS–Patriotic Bloc for the Restoration of the Kingdom of Serbia	165,181	4.46
Milica Đurđević Stamenkovski	Serbian Party Oathkeepers	160,553	4.33
Biljana Stojković	Citizens' Group: We Must–Biljana Stojković, President of Serbia	122,378	3.30
Branka Stamenković	Coalition: Sovereignists–Saša Radulović (DJB), Milan Stamatović (ZS), Dr. Jovana Stojković (ŽZS)	77,031	2.08
Miša Vacić	Citizens' Group: Serbian Patriot–Serbian Right	32,947	0.89
Total		3,707,679	100.00
Valid votes		3,707,679	97.63
Invalid/blank votes		89,933	2.37
Total votes		3,797,612	100.00
Registered voters/turnout		6,502,307	58.62
