= Sovereignists (Serbia) =

Political coalition in Serbia

Sovereignists Суверенисти Suverenisti
- Leaders: Saša Radulović; Milan Stamatović; Jovana Stojković
- Founded: 30 November 2021
- Dissolved: April 2022
- Ideology: Right-wing populism
- Political position: Right-wing to far-right
- Members: Enough is Enough; Healthy Serbia; I live for Serbia
- Colours: Blue

Website
- suverenisti.rs

The Sovereignists (Serbian Cyrillic: Суверенисти, romanised: Suverenisti) were a right-wing populist political coalition in Serbia that participated in the 2022 general election. Initially formed as an agreement between the Enough is Enough (DJB) and Healthy Serbia (ZS) political parties, it was transformed into a political coalition in January 2022. In the 2022 general election, Branka Stamenković was its presidential candidate. The coalition failed to cross the 3 percent threshold and won no seats in the National Assembly.

== History ==
=== Formation and early history ===
During a press conference on 30 November 2021, Saša Radulović, the leader of the Enough is Enough (DJB) political party, announced the formation the "Sovereignists"; initially it was a political agreement between DJB and Healthy Serbia (ZS). DJB had previously used the "Sovereignists" label in the 2020 parliamentary election. The agreement was mainly formed to lower the potential electoral fraud for the January 2022 constitutional referendum, by signing up election controllers. Milan Stamatović stated that one of the priorities of the Sovereignists would be to protect "national interests". DJB claimed that the constitutional referendum was allegedly orchestrated at the will of the European Union and George Soros. The party had called other opposition parties to participate in the campaign by stating their opposition to the constitutional changes. In December, the agreement also gained support from far-right anti-vax activist Jovana Stojković and historian Čedomir Antić, while Radulović stated that the signatory parties might participate in the general elections in a joint coalition.

Following the constitutional referendum in January 2022, the Sovereignists had claimed that 600,000 votes were falsified and that they would not recognise the results of the referendum. An appeal was filed to the Republic Electoral Commission (RIK), although it was eventually rejected. Its members participated in a protest which occurred a day after the referendum.

=== 2022 election ===
In late January, the coalition was formalised, with Radulović announcing their joint participation in the general elections. Its parliamentary list was announced by RIK on 23 February. Five days later, the Sovereignists had announced Branka Stamenković as their presidential candidate. The Sovereignists had campaigned in several cities across Serbia. The coalition won 2.2% of the popular vote and failed to cross the 3% threshold.

== Political positions ==
The coalition rejected the left–right axis, instead claiming that the modern division is between globalists and sovereignists. The coalition also emphasised its Eurosceptic views and its opposition to mandatory vaccination. Its representatives were also opposed to NATO, and they had stated that "Serbia must not impose sanctions on Russia". The coalition also stated its support for the implementation of blockchain technology, while it also supported free textbooks for kindergartens and primary schools. Stamatović had commented that, "farmers should receive greater help from the government". Vojin Biljić stated that "Sovereignists would ensure government transparency". In an interview, presidential candidate Stamenković stated her support for the introduction of mandatory conscription into the army.

== Members ==
Name	Leader	Main ideology	Political position	MPs (2022 election)
Enough is Enough (DJB)	Saša Radulović	Right-wing populism	Right-wing to far-right	0 / 250
Healthy Serbia (ZS)	Milan Stamatović	National conservatism	Right-wing	0 / 250
I live for Serbia (ŽZS)	Jovana Stojković	Anti-vax	Far-right	0 / 250

== Electoral performance ==
=== Parliamentary elections ===
National Assembly
Year	Leader		Popular vote	% of popular vote	# of seats	Seat change	Government
Year	Name	Party	Popular vote	% of popular vote	# of seats	Seat change	Government
2022	Saša Radulović	DJB	86,362	2.34%	0 / 250	0	Extra-parliamentary

=== Presidential elections ===
President of Serbia
Year	Candidate		1st round popular vote		% of popular vote	2nd round popular vote		% of popular vote
Year	Name	Party	1st round popular vote		% of popular vote	2nd round popular vote		% of popular vote
2022	Branka Stamenković	DJB	7th	77,031	2.08%	—N/a	—	—

=== Belgrade City Assembly elections ===
City Assembly of Belgrade
Year	Leader		Popular vote	% of popular vote	# of seats	Seat change	Government
Year	Name	Party	Popular vote	% of popular vote	# of seats	Seat change	Government
2022	Vojin Biljić	DJB	19,544	2.18%	0 / 110	0	Extra-parliamentary
