= Slobodan Jeremić =

Serbian politician (born 1949)

Slobodan Jeremić (Serbian Cyrillic: Слободан Јеремић; born 17 March 1949) is a former politician in Serbia. He served in the National Assembly of Serbia from 2012 to 2014 as a member of the Party of United Pensioners of Serbia (Partija ujedinjenih penzionera Srbije, PUPS).

== Private life ==
Jeremić is from the village of Rudine in the municipality of Čajetina. He is a pensioner.

== Politician ==
The PUPS contested the 2007 Serbian parliamentary election in an alliance with the Social Democratic Party (Socijaldemokratska partija, SDP), and Jeremić appeared in the eighty-third position on the combined electoral list of the parties. The list did not cross the electoral threshold to win representation in the assembly.

=== Parliamentarian ===
After the 2007 election, the PUPS formed a new alliance with the Socialist Party of Serbia (Socijalistička partija Srbije, SPS). Jeremić received the forty-second position on the SPS's coalition list in the 2012 parliamentary election and was elected when the list won forty-four seats. The PUPS participated in a coalition government led by the SPS and the Serbian Progressive Party (Srpska napredna stranka, SNS) after the election, and Jeremić served as a government supporter. He also led a standalone PUPS list in the concurrent 2012 Serbian local elections in Čajetina; this list did not cross the electoral threshold.

In the assembly, Jeremić was a member of the committee on spatial planning, transport, infrastructure, and telecommunications; a deputy member of the committee on finance, budget, and control of public spending; a deputy member of the committee on agriculture, forestry, and water management; and a member of the parliamentary friendship groups with China and Russia.

In early 2014, it was reported that the Čajetina board of the PUPS had been dissolved and Jeremić expelled from the party. He denied the accuracy of the report. The latter claim, at least, seems to have been inaccurate; Jeremić was again included on the SPS's list in the 2014 parliamentary election, in the 128th position. Re-election from this position was improbable, and Jeremić was indeed not elected when the list again won forty-four mandates.

== Lawsuit against Milan Stamatović ==
In 2016, Čajetina mayor Milan Stamatović was ordered to pay a 300.000 dinar fine to Jeremić for mental anguish resulting from damage to the latter's honour and reputation. Stamatović had previously cited Jeremić in the media as the owner of an illegal catering firm in the elite section of the tourist resort town of Zlatibor in Čajetina; he also said that the company Zlatibor - Tourist, overseen by Jeremić's brother, intended to expropriate valuable land in the area under a privatization scheme and that some members of the Jeremić family owned illegal buildings in the community. Stamatović refused to retract his comments after the verdict against him was upheld by the Court of Appeals in Kragujevac. Jeremić, for his part, defended the propriety and legality of his family's holdings in Zlatibor. He added that he was no longer a member of the PUPS and was not active in politics.
