= Sarmu probo nisi =

Sarmu probo nisi Сарму пробо ниси
- Founded: 2016
- Headquarters: Mladenovac
- Ideology: Satire

Sarmu probo nisi (Serbian Cyrillic: Сарму пробо ниси, pronounced [sǎrmu prǒːboː nǐːsi], meaning "You haven't tasted the sarma"; abbr. SPN, Serbian Cyrillic: СПН) is a satirical political organization in Serbia formed in Mladenovac in 2016.

== History ==
SPN started as a fictional political party created by a group of comedians from Mladenovac. They became popular after they filmed a humorous parody promotional video for their fictional leader "Ljubiša Preletačević Beli" (played by a man named Luka Maksimović). After the video became popular on YouTube, they were persuaded by followers to participate in the election. The group vowed to make a lot of false promises and false hope. The focal point of their campaign was the promise to open a euthanasia department for pensioners in the local hospital in order to spare the country of their expenses.

Local council elections were held in most municipalities and cities in Serbia on 24 April 2016, together with the 2016 parliamentary election. Because SPN was not officially registered as political party, they participated as an independent list called "Beli – Samo jako" (Beli – Keep it strong!). This list surprisingly won 20% of the votes and 12 seats, becoming the second strongest group in the local council of Mladenovac, behind only the ruling Serbian Progressive Party.

Ljubiša Preletačević, the leader of SPN, participated in the 2017 Serbian presidential election. He came third with 9.44% of the vote.

In early 2018, the party dissociated itself from Maksimović/Preletačević. Maksimović subsequently formed a new electoral list and participated in the March 2018 election for the Assembly of the City of Belgrade with this new group.

== Electoral results ==
=== Presidential elections ===
President of Serbia
Election year	#	Candidate	1st round votes	%	2nd round votes	%	Notes
2017	3rd	Luka Maksimović	344,498	9.42	—	—	
