= Mladen Grujić =

Politician and entrepreneur in Serbia

Mladen Grujić (Serbian Cyrillic: Младен Грујић; born 22 September 1966) is a politician and entrepreneur in Serbia. He has served in the National Assembly of Serbia since 2007, originally as a member of New Serbia and since January 2017 as an independent. He was a member of the Assembly of Serbia and Montenegro from 2004 to 2006. Grujić served on the Executive Committee and the Committee on the Human Rights of Parliamentarians of the Inter-Parliamentary Union.

== Early life and private career ==
Grujić graduated from the University of Belgrade's Faculty of Organizational Sciences as an engineer in the field of labour organization. As a student he was president of AIESEC (Association internationale des étudiants en sciences économiques et commerciales) Yugoslavia in 1989/90. He left Serbia in 1990 and worked in the Netherlands, Milan, and Prague over the next decade. After returning to Serbia, he became a director of the cigarette distribution company Stampa Commerce.

Grujić opened a chain of pharmaceutical stores under the name Lilly in 2003. By 2009, he was operating ninety-one pharmaceutical stories along with a variety of other business ventures. In an interview published that year, he said that his private business holdings did not create a conflict-of-interest situation for him as an elected representative, though he noted that a conflict would exist if he held an executive position in the government of Serbia.

In 2020 Grujić sold his bakery chain Xлеб & Кифле to Mid Europa Partners for an undisclosed sum.

He regularly appears on the list of the 100 richest persons in the countries of former Yugoslavia (HR, MNE, BIH, SLO, SRB, MK). In 2021 Nedeljnik, a weekly news magazine with the highest circulation in Serbia assessed him as 54th richest Serb

== Politician ==
Grujić received the thirty-first position on the combined electoral list of New Serbia and the Serbian Renewal Movement in the 2003 parliamentary election. The list won twenty-two seats; Grujić was selected for an assembly mandate and took his seat when parliament met on 27 January 2004. (From 2000 to 2011, Serbian parliamentary mandates were awarded to sponsoring parties or coalitions rather than to individual candidates, and it was common practice for mandates to be assigned out of numerical order.)

His first term in the National Assembly proved brief. By virtue of its performance in the 2003 election, the New Serbia–Serbian Renewal Movement alliance won the right to appoint eight delegates to the federal Assembly of Serbia and Montenegro. Grujić was selected as one of New Serbia's delegates on 12 February 2004, and so resigned his seat in the national assembly. He held the federal mandate for two years; the assembly ceased to exist in 2006, when Montenegro declared independence.

New Serbia contested the 2007 parliamentary election in an alliance with the Democratic Party of Serbia. Grujić received the sixty-first position on their combined electoral list, which won forty-seven mandates, and was chosen as one of his party's delegates. He was again included on the Democratic Party of Serbia–New Serbia list for the 2008 parliamentary election and was selected for a third term when the alliance won thirty mandates. Grujić was a parliamentary supporter of Vojislav Koštunica's administration following the 2007 election and served in opposition to Mirko Cvetković's government from 2008 to 2012.

He also appeared on a combined Democratic Party of Serbia–New Serbia list for the City Assembly of Belgrade in the 2008 Serbian local elections. The list won twelve mandates, and he was not included in his party's delegation.

Grujić was a substitute member of Serbia's delegation to the Parliamentary Assembly of the Council of Europe from January 2011 to October 2012. He caucused with the European People's Party and was an alternate member of the committee on the environment, agriculture, and local and regional affairs; and the social health, and family affairs committee.

Serbia's electoral system was reformed in 2011, such that parliamentary mandates were awarded in numerical order to candidates on successful lists. New Serbia joined the Serbian Progressive Party's Let's Get Serbia Moving coalition for the 2012 parliamentary election. Grujić was given the sixty-seventh position on its list and was elected to a fourth term when the list won seventy-three mandates. He was again included on the Progressive-led lists for the 2014 and 2016 elections and was returned both times when the coalition around the Progressive Party won landslide victories.

In January 2017, New Serbia leader Velimir Ilić broke with Progressive Party leader Aleksandar Vučić's administration. Grujić opposed this decision, announced that he would continue to support Vučić, and left New Serbia. Fellow parliamentarians Dubravka Filipovski and Dragan Jovanović also left the party in the same period for the same reason. All three continue to support Vučić's administration.

During the 2016–20 parliament, Grujić served on the European Integration Committee, was a deputy member of the foreign affairs committee and the European Union–Serbia stabilization and association committee, a member of Serbia's delegation to the Inter-Parliamentary Union Assembly, and a member of the parliamentary friendship groups with Bulgaria and Iran.

In October 2018, Grujić was elected to the executive board of the Inter-Parliamentary Union. He was the first delegate from Serbia ever to serve in this role and the first representative from Eastern Europe to serve on the executive in twenty years.

He received the 134th position on the Progressive Party's list in the 2020 Serbian parliamentary election and was elected to a seventh term in the national assembly when the list won a landslide majority with 188 mandates. He continues to serve in Serbia's delegation to the Inter-Parliamentary Union assembly, is a deputy member of the stabilization and association committee, and is a member of the parliamentary friendship groups with Bulgaria, China, Greece, and Qatar.
