= Ljupka Mihajlovska =

Serbian politician

Ljupka Mihajlovska (Serbian Cyrillic: Љупка Михајловска; born 1981) is a politician in Serbia. She has served in the National Assembly of Serbia since 2016, originally as a member of the anti-establishment and reformist It's Enough – Restart (Dosta je bilo, DJB) association, better known in English by the name "Enough Is Enough." She is now a member of the Party of Modern Serbia.

== Private career ==
Mihajlovska graduated from the University of Belgrade Faculty of Philology in 2009 and later became the director of the university's Center for Students with Disabilities. She became executive director of the non-governmental organization (NGO) Udruženje studenata sa hendikepom (English: Association of Students with Disabilities) in 2011 and subsequently founded an NGO called Podeli znanje (English: Share Knowledge). She was also a member of the Expert Team for Reform of Higher Education of the Republic of Serbia from 2013 to 2015 and took part in the preparations for Serbia's National Youth Strategy 2015–2025 and the Action Plan 2015–2017.

== Member of the National Assembly ==
Mihajlovska received the fourteenth position on the It's Enough – Restart electoral list in the 2016 Serbian parliamentary election and was elected when the list won sixteen mandates. The election was won by the Serbian Progressive Party and its allies, and Mihajlovska serves as a member of the opposition.

Mihajlovska uses a wheelchair and was initially required to sit in the last row of the assembly following her election, as it was the only accessible row. The It's Enough – Restart association protested this situation, noting that it required Mihajlovska be separated from her caucus colleagues and describing it as a human rights violation. In late 2017, Mihajlovska spoke at an Organization for Security and Co-operation in Europe (OSCE) event in Andorra on "the participation of persons with disabilities in parliaments and their access to other elected positions."

She resigned from It's Enough – Restart on March 15, 2018, indicating her dissatisfaction with the party's direction since the 2016 election. She subsequently joined with four other former members of It's Enough – Restart to start a new association called the Free MPs parliamentary group.

All members of the Free MPs parliamentary group also joined a new political group called the Movement of the Center. In December 2018, this group merged with the Social Democratic Union to create the Party of Modern Serbia. Mihajlovska now serves as a member of this party.

Before leaving DJB, a member of the parliamentary committee on labour, social issues, social inclusion, and poverty reduction; a deputy member of four other committees; and a member of Serbia's delegation to the South-East European Cooperation Process Parliamentary Assembly. She is now a member of the assembly's working group on the political empowerment of persons with disabilities, and member of the working group for national minority right, and a member Serbia's parliamentary friendship groups with Australia, Cuba, Italy, Mexico, North Macedonia, Russia, Sweden, and the United States of America.
