= Dubravka Filipovski =

Serbian politician

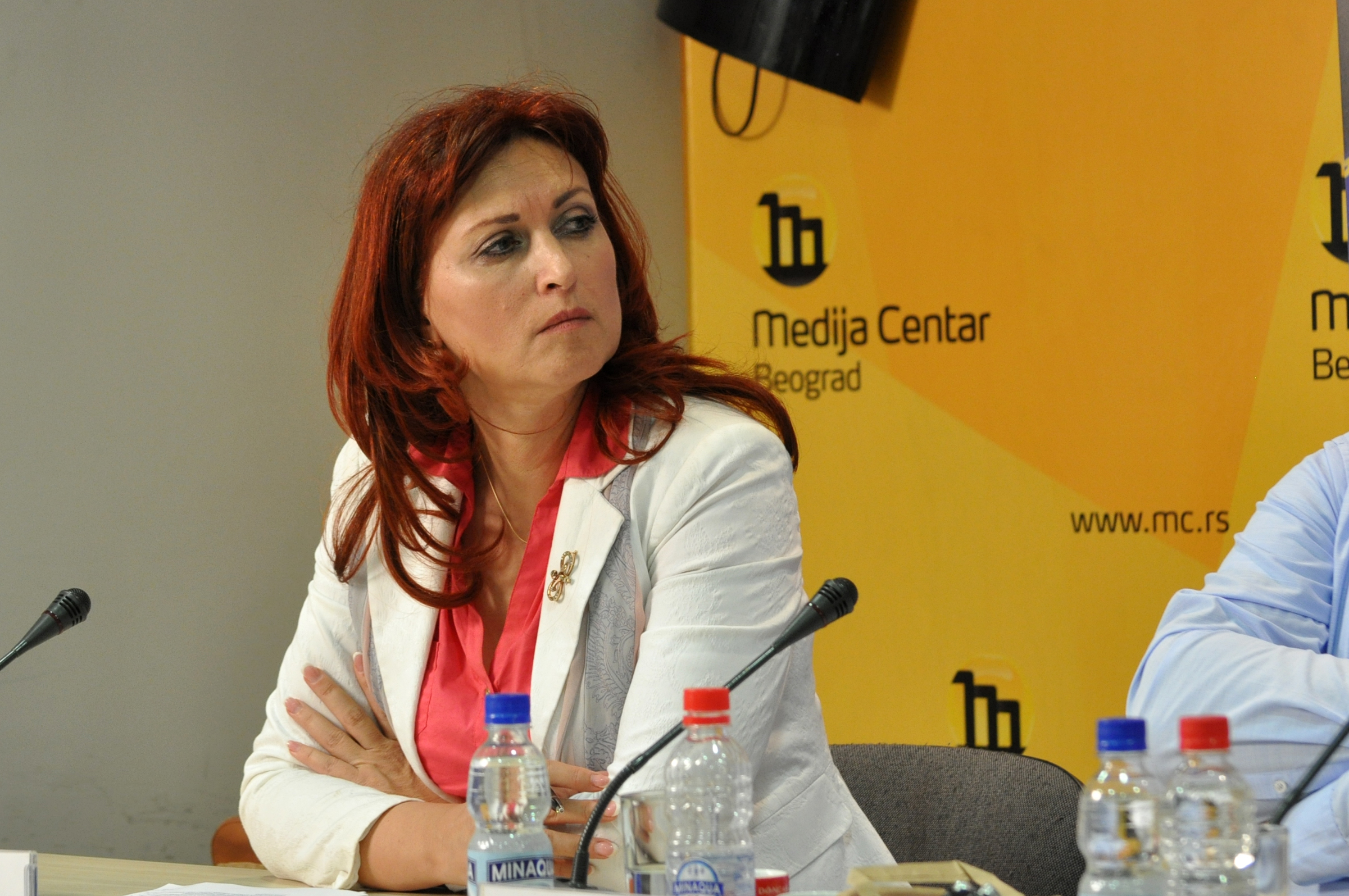

Dubravka Filipovski (Serbian Cyrillic: Дубравка Филиповски, née Čekanović; born January 27, 1967) is a politician in Serbia. She has served in the National Assembly of Serbia since 2012. Previously a member of New Serbia, Filipovski has been a member of the Serbian Progressive Party since November 2017.

== Early life and career ==
Filipovski was born in Novi Pazar, in the Sandžak region of what was then the Socialist Republic of Serbia in the Socialist Federal Republic of Yugoslavia. She is a graduate of the University of Belgrade Faculty of Philosophy, and from 1992 to 1994 she was an assistant in the university's department of adult education. She worked in the private sector from 1994 to 2004.

== New Serbia official ==
Filipovski joined New Serbia in 2004 and was appointed as a party spokesperson later in the same year. She appeared on the party's electoral list for the City Assembly of Belgrade in the 2004 Serbian local elections. The list did not cross the electoral threshold to win any mandates. In November 2005, she was chosen as a party vice-chair.

New Serbia contested both the 2007 and 2008 parliamentary elections in an alliance with the Democratic Party of Serbia; Filipovski received the eighth position on the coalition's electoral list in each instance, although she did not take a seat in parliament on either occasion. She also received the eighth position on the coalition's list for the Belgrade city assembly in the 2008 local elections. The list won twelve mandates, though she did not take a seat in the city assembly either. (From 2000 to 2011, mandates in Serbian elections were awarded to sponsoring parties or coalitions rather than to individual candidates, and it was common practice for mandates to be awarded out of numerical order.)

In July 2007, Serbian president Boris Tadić offered an apology to Croatian people and to the citizens of Croatia for crimes that had been committed by Serbian people in the Yugoslav Wars of the 1990s. This statement prompted a mixed response in Serbia. Filipovski, speaking for New Serbia, called for a political representative from Croatia to reciprocate the gesture. She was quoted as saying, "Crimes have not been committed just by Serbs. Crimes must be cleared up so that the real story would be put together in the Balkans."

A media report in 2007 described Filipovski as one of two New Serbia members best positioned to succeed party leader Velimir Ilić if he were to resign his position. Filipovski acknowledged Ilić's importance to the party in this period, saying, "We could not even imagine our party without Velimir Ilić and we are proud of that."

In 2008, Filipovski accused the incoming government of Serbian prime minister Mirko Cvetković of trying to carry out a "media purge" via its appointments to the news agency Tanjug and the journal Politika. She later criticized a police raid on the offices of the tabloid Kurir, claiming that the action was a "prelude to dictatorship."

She spoke against the proposed departure of the United Nations Interim Administration Mission in Kosovo (UNMIK) from Kosovo and Metohija in 2009, arguing that the organization had an obligation to stay in the disputed region and not to cede its position to the European Union Rule of Law Mission in Kosovo. Filipovski was also critical of Islamic Community in Serbia leader Muamer Zukorlić during this time, accusing him of favouring the secession of the Sandžak and of sowing discord between Bosniaks and Serbs.

In February 2010, Filipovski announced that New Serbia would join with the recently formed Serbian Progressive Party in demanding new parliamentary elections. Later in the year, Filipovski and Progressive Party vice-chair Aleksandar Vučić called on Serbian citizens to join a major anti-government rally planned for June 28.

Filipovski also served as assistant to the president of the Voždovac municipality in Belgrade, following the establishment of a municipal governing alliance that included New Serbia. She left the position after being elected to the National Assembly in 2012.

== Parliamentarian ==
Serbia's electoral system was reformed in 2011, such that parliamentary mandates were awarded in numerical order to candidates on successful lists. New Serbia joined the Progressive Party's Let's Get Serbia Moving coalition for the 2012 parliamentary election. Filipovski was given the eighteenth position on the alliance's electoral list and was duly elected when the list won seventy-three mandates. After the election, New Serbia joined a coalition government led by the Progressive Party, and Filipovski served as part of the government's parliamentary majority. She received high positions on the Progressive-led lists for the 2014 and 2016 elections and was easily returned when the Progressive coalition won landslide victories on both occasions.

Filipovski resigned from New Serbia in January 2017, saying that she had lost confidence in both Ilić and the party's direction. This occurred after Ilić withdrew support from prime minister Aleksandar Vučić and publicly criticized his administration. A report in Tanjug from this period described Filipovski as having for many years been the only publicly recognizable personality in New Serbia other than Ilić. Two other New Serbia parliamentarians, Mladen Grujić and Dragan Jovanović, also left the party in this period due to disagreements with Ilić. All three initially served as independents and continued to support Vučić's administration. Filipovski joined the Progressive Party on 17 November 2017.

During the 2016–20 parliament, Filipovski served as deputy chair of the foreign affairs committee and was a member of the parliamentary defence and internal affairs committee and the committee on the rights of the child; a deputy member of the European integration committee; the leader of Serbia's parliamentary friendship groups with Egypt and Georgia; and a member of the parliamentary friendship groups with Albania, Bahrain, Bhutan, Canada, China, Chile, Djibouti, El Salvador, Ethiopia, Fiji, Germany, Guyana, Kuwait, Latvia, Lesotho, Malawi, Micronesia, Moldova, Nepal, Oman, the Philippines, Russia, Sierra Leone, Switzerland, Tajikistan, Uganda, the United Kingdom, the United States of America, Vietnam, Zambia, and Zimbabwe. She was also nominated as a substitute member of Serbia's delegation to the Parliamentary Assembly of the Council of Europe (PACE), where in September 2017 she became a founding member of a political grouping called the Free Democrats Group. Filipovski served as the deputy chair of this group from June 2018 to March 2019. She subsequently left the Free Democrats and, in April 2019, joined the grouping of the European People's Party. She was a member of the committee on the honouring of obligations and commitments by member states of the Council of Europe in 2019, and she currently serves as an alternate member on the committee on equality and non-discrimination, the committee on legal affairs and human rights, and the committee on social affairs, health, and sustainable development.

Karić received the twenty-eighth position on the Progressive Party's Aleksandar Vučić — For Our Children electoral list for the 2020 Serbian parliamentary election and was returned for a fourth term when the list won a landslide victory with 188 mandates. She is now a member of the foreign affairs committee, the European integration committee, and the committee on the rights of the child, and a deputy member of the European Union–Serbia association and stabilization committee. She was also promoted to a full member of Serbia's delegation to the PACE, continues to lead the parliamentary friendship groups with Egypt and Georgia, and serves on the friendship groups with Albania, China, Cyprus, Russia, Switzerland, and the United States of America.
