= Ljubivoje Ršumović =

Serbian poet and writer

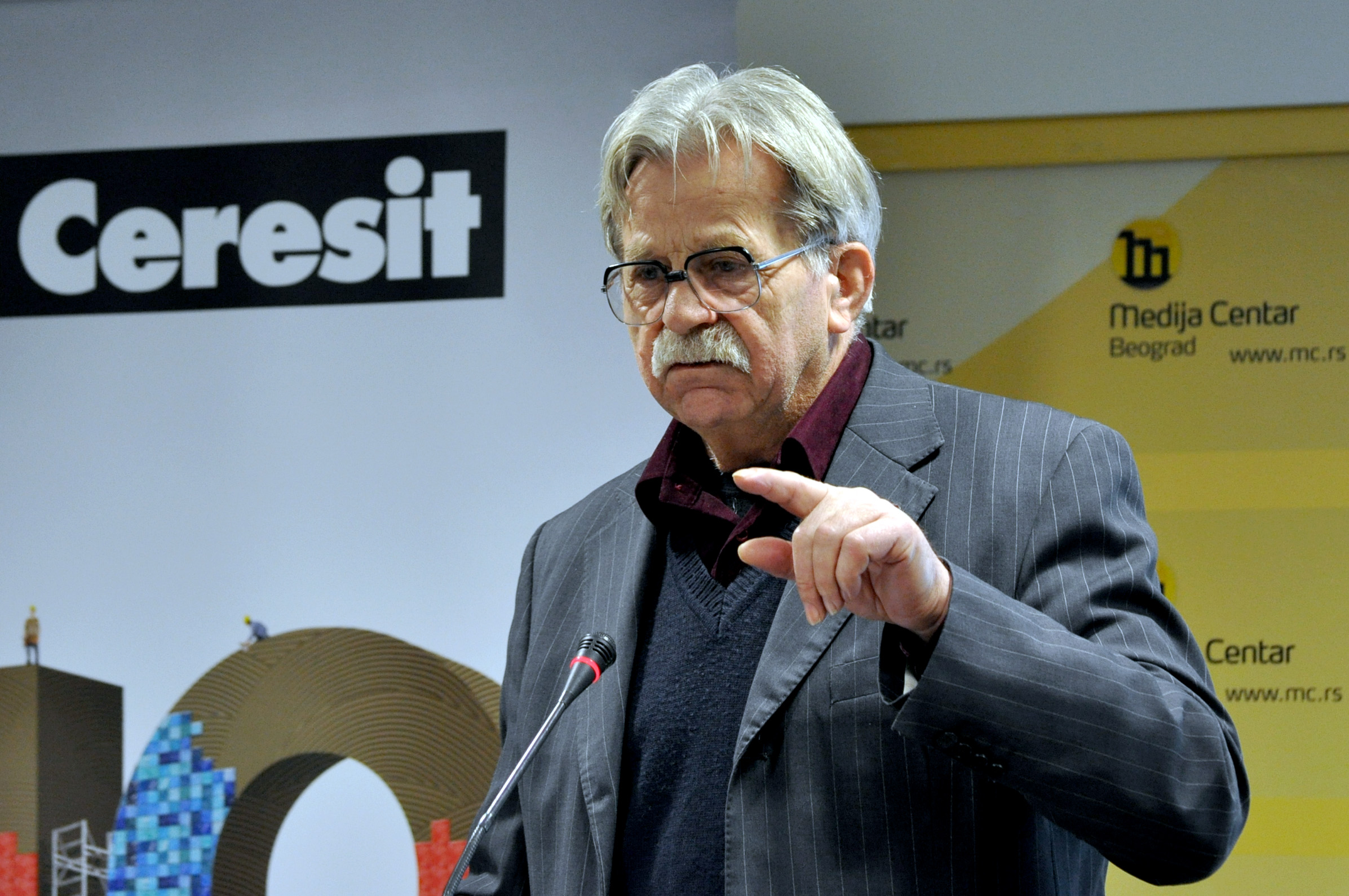
- Ršumović in 2013
- Born: 3 July 1939 (age 87); Ljubiš, Kingdom of Yugoslavia
- Education: University of Belgrade Faculty of Philology
- Occupation: Poet

Ljubivoje Ršumović (Serbian Cyrillic: Љубивоје Ршумовић; born 3 July 1939) is a Serbian poet and writer.

Ršumović is predominantly a writer and poet for children; however, a portion of his work is literature for adults.

== Biography ==
He was born on 3 July 1939 in the village of Ljubiš in the Zlatibor Mountains. His parents were Mihailo and Milesa Ršumović. He was educated in Ljubiš, Čajetina, Užice, and Belgrade. He has a bachelor's degree from the University of Belgrade's Faculty of Philology. He is known as author of lyrics of anthem of Red Star Belgrade.

== Selected works ==
- Ma šta mi reče
- Još nam samo ale fale
- Domovina se brani lepotom
- Ujdurme i zvrčke iz antičke Grčke
- Sunčanje na mesečini
- Tri čvora na trepavici
- Zauvari
- Vidovite priče
- Što na umu, to na drumu
- Provale i cake
- Izvolte u bajku sa čika Ršumom
