= Healthy Serbia =

Political party in Serbia

Healthy Serbia Здрава Србија
- Abbreviation: ZS
- President: Milan Stamatović
- Vice-Presidents: Milan Paroški; Miloljub Albijanić; Oliver Paunović
- Founded: 5 July 2017
- Headquarters: Čajetina
- Ideology: Populism; National conservatism
- Political position: Right-wing
- Colours: Green; Gold
- Slogan: "Za Zdravu Srbiju" ("For a Healthy Serbia")
- National Assembly: 2 / 250
- Assembly of Vojvodina: 0 / 120

Website
- zdravasrbija.org.rs

Healthy Serbia (Serbian: Здрава Србија, romanised: Zdrava Srbija, abbr. ZS) is a right-wing political party in Serbia. It was founded in 2017 by Milan Stamatović, the long-time mayor of Čajetina.

== History ==
After leaving the Democratic Party of Serbia and further disagreements with the President of the Serbian People's Party Nenad Popović over Popović's support for the ruling party's leader Aleksandar Vučić's candidacy at the 2017 Serbian Presidential election, Milan Stamatović decided to run for President himself. Together with his supporters, he founded the "For a Healthy Serbia" Citizens' Group, which nominated him. Stamatović received 1.15% of the overall votes in Serbia, but the fact that he won 61.23% of votes in his hometown of Čajetina encouraged him to found his own political party.

Healthy Serbia was officially founded on 5 June 2017 in the western Serbian village of Ljubiš, where Stamatović received 99% of the votes. Among the founders were famous Serbian poet Ljubivoje Ršumović and Serbian writer Milan Paroški. At that occasion, Stamatović said that "Healthy Serbia would be an authentic regional party, but also a party devoted to making entire Serbia healthier by working from the interior, and not from Belgrade."

On 21 August 2017, Healthy Serbia and Dveri signed an agreement on joint political action. Stamatović said that neither of these two political parties have ever flirted with the ruling Serbian Progressive Party (SNS), which he considers to be a huge advantage. He also mentioned that these two political organisations do not wish to topple the Government on the streets, but through elections.

In the 2020 parliamentary elections, Healthy Serbia participated in a coalition with Better Serbia.

In April 2023, anti-vax and far-right I live for Serbia merged into ZS. Stamatović was present at the 15th anniversary since the founding assembly of the Serbian Progressive Party in October 2023. Healthy Serbia participated in the 2023 parliamentary election as part of the SNS-led Serbia Must Not Stop coalition and won 3 seats in the National Assembly.

== Ideology and platform ==
ZS is opposed to sanctioning Russia due to the Russian invasion of Ukraine. It advocates for the establishment of closer relations with Russia and China, claiming that "they are strongest guarantors of the territorial integrity of Serbia".

== Electoral performance ==
=== Parliamentary elections ===
National Assembly of Serbia
Year	Leader	Popular vote	% of popular vote	#	# of seats	Seat change	Coalition	Status	Ref.
2020	Milan Stamatović	33,435	1.08%	▲11th	0 / 250	0	ZS–BS	Extra-parliamentary	
2022	Milan Stamatović	86,362	2.34%	▲8th	0 / 250	0	Sovereignists	Extra-parliamentary	
2023	Milan Stamatović	1,783,701	48.07%	▲1st	3 / 250	▲3	SNSDS	Support	
2026	Milan Stamatović			▼2nd	0 / 250		US	Opposition	

View source data.

=== Presidential elections ===
President of Serbia
Year	Candidate	1st round popular vote		% of popular vote	2nd round popular vote		% of popular vote	Notes	Ref.
2022	Branka Stamenković	7th	77,031	2.08%	—N/a	—	—	Supported Stamenković	
