= Enough is Enough (party) =

Political party in Serbia

Enough is Enough Доста је било
- Abbreviation: DJB
- President: Saša Radulović
- Deputy Presidents: Branka Stamenković; Vojin Biljić; Aleksandar Bujić; Hana Adrović
- Founded: 27 January 2014
- Registered: 11 February 2022
- Headquarters: Nušićeva 27, Belgrade
- Ideology: Conservatism; Right-wing populism; Until 2018: Liberalism; Progressivism
- Political position: Right-wing to far-right
- European affiliation: European Conservatives and Reformists Party (regional partner, until 2025)
- Colours: Orange
- National Assembly: 0 / 250
- Assembly of Vojvodina: 0 / 120
- City Assembly of Belgrade: 0 / 110

Website
- dostajebilo.rs

Enough is Enough (Serbian: Доста је било, romanised: Dosta je bilo, abbr. DJB) is a right-wing populist political party in Serbia.

It was established on 27 January 2014 around the former minister of economy Saša Radulović and his associates from the ministry. Initially, the party had strong liberal, reformist, and progressive views, and in the 2016 parliamentary election they entered the parliament with 16 seats in total. Between early 2017 and 2018, its pro-European and liberal factions split off due to the internal conflict in the party. Since then, the party has shifted to the far-right and it began advocating souverainist and eurosceptic policies alongside numerous right-wing populist stances such as opposition to immigration. Its leader, Saša Radulović also promoted misinformation and several conspiracy theories during the COVID-19 pandemic.

== History ==
It was founded on 27 January 2014 as Association "It's Enough – Restart" (Serbian: Удружење "Доста је било – Рестарт", romanized: Udruženje "Dosta je bilo – Restart"), and since then it was commonly known as Enough is Enough (Serbian: Доста је било, romanized: Dosta je bilo; abbr. DJB). In 2014 Serbian parliamentary election, held less than two months after establishment, the organisation won 2.09% of votes. In yet another early 2016 Serbian parliamentary election, DJB won 6.02% (227,626 votes), thus gaining 16 seats in the National Assembly.

The It's Enough–Restart group in the National Assembly lost three of its members in February 2017, when Aleksandra Čabraja, Jovan Jovanović, and Sonja Pavlović left to start an organisation called the Civic Platform. After long delay in deciding whether to take part in the 2017 Serbian presidential election, DJB eventually appointed Saša Radulović as candidate for the election. He came in seventh place with 51,651 votes (1.41%).

On 15 March 2018, Ljupka Mihajlovska resigned from the DJB assembly group to sit as an independent. The following day, Miloš Bošković resigned from DJB and also resigned from the assembly, returning his mandate to the association.

In 2018, DJB main board expelled assembly members Nenad Božić, Vladimir Đurić, and Aleksandar Stevanović from membership in the association on 29 March 2018. Tatjana Macura also resigned from the association on 12 April 2018, following a brief, abortive bid for its presidency. Macura subsequently started a new association called the Free MPs parliamentary group, joined by Božić, Đurić, Mihajlovska, and Stevanović. In addition, Bošković's replacement Nada Kostić ultimately chose not to sit with DJB. In the aftermath of these changes, DJB had seven deputies in the assembly.

Only several months later, Dušan Pavlović left the DJB. This led to another wave of leaving. Another five deputies leave the DJB parliamentary club. By the mid-November 2018, DJB was reduced to only two deputies in the Assembly (Radulović and Stamenković) and no parliamentary club.

In the 2018 Belgrade election, a combined DJB–Dveri list failed to pass the electoral threshold. Saša Radulović subsequently stepped down as president of the party on 6 March 2018, along with all deputy presidents. On 21 April 2018 Branislav Mihajlović, head of the DJB in Bor, was elected party president. On 8 November 2018 Branislav Mihajlović was dismissed and replaced by deputy party president Branka Stamenković as a temporary leader. DJB joined other opposition parties in National Assembly sessions boycott.

On 14 December 2018, group of former DJB MPs formed centrist Party of Modern Serbia.

On 19 October 2019, Saša Radulović was re-elected as party leader, while Branka Stamenković was elected deputy president. On 7 March 2020. DJB declared 2020 Serbian parliamentary election boycott together with Alliance for Serbia coalition and Social Democratic Party. They eventually decided to participate in the elections, but failed to pass the 3% threshold (earned 2.32%), thus becoming non-parliamentary organisation.

DJB took part on the 2022 parliamentary elections in coalition with Milan Stamatović (mayor of the Čajetina municipality and the leader of Healthy Serbia movement), and doctor Jovana Stojković, known for her anti-vaccine attitudes. They ran under the name Sovereignists, but again failed to clear the 3 per cent threshold. After the April elections, DJB became inactive until February 2023, when it was announced that it would become politically active again.

== Ideology ==
It was historically a centrist party, and it supported liberalism, neoliberalism, and progressivism. It was also focused on populist, anti-establishment and anti-corruption rhetoric, and it advocated reformism. Since 2018, it has been described as a right-wing populist, and conservative party, and it opposes immigration. It is positioned on the right-wing and far-right on the political spectrum, and it is also supportive of souverainism and euroscepticism.

In the Parliamentary Assembly of the Council of Europe, DJB was associated with the Alliance of Liberals and Democrats for Europe. In 2019, it became a member of the European Conservatives Group and Democratic Alliance.

== List of presidents ==
#	President	Birth–Death	Term start	Term end
1	Saša Radulović	1965–	27 January 2014	21 April 2018
2	Branislav Mihajlović	1953–	21 April 2018	8 November 2018
3	Branka Stamenković	1953–	8 November 2018	19 October 2019
4	Saša Radulović	1965–	19 October 2019	Incumbent

== Electoral performance ==
=== Parliamentary elections ===
National Assembly of Serbia
Year	Leader	Popular vote	% of popular vote	#	# of seats	Seat change	Coalition	Status	Ref.
2014	Saša Radulović	74,973	2.16%	▲10th	0 / 250	0	–	Extra-parliamentary	
2016	Saša Radulović	227,626	6.21%	▲4th	16 / 250	▲16	–	Opposition	
2020	Saša Radulović	73,953	2.39%	▼5th	0 / 250	▼16	–	Extra-parliamentary	
2022	Saša Radulović	86,362	2.34%	▼8th	0 / 250	0	Sovereignists	Extra-parliamentary	
2023	Saša Radulović	45,079	1.21%	▼9th	0 / 250	0	DJS	Extra-parliamentary	
2026	Saša Radulović	Did not participate			0 / 250	0	Supported SL	Extra-parliamentary	

=== Presidential elections ===
President of Serbia
Year	Candidate	1st round popular vote		% of popular vote	2nd round popular vote		% of popular vote	Ref.
2017	Saša Radulović	7th	51,651	1.44%	—N/a	—	—	
2022	Branka Stamenković	7th	77,031	2.08%	—N/a	—	—	

=== Provincial elections ===
Provincial Assembly of Vojvodina
Year	Leader	Popular vote	% of popular vote	#	# of seats	Seat change	Coalition	Status	Ref.
2016	Saša Radulović	53,317	5.70%	▲6th	7 / 120	▲7	–	Opposition	
2020	Saša Radulović	Did not participate			0 / 120	▼7	–	Extra-parliamentary	
2023	Saša Radulović	14,715	1.54%	▼9th	0 / 120	0	DJS	Extra-parliamentary	
