= Better Serbia =

Political party in Serbia

Better Serbia Боља Србија Bolja Srbija
- Abbreviation: BS
- President: Dragan Jovanović
- Secretary: Milovan Cvetković
- Founded: 24 July 2017
- Dissolved: 12 April 2023
- Split from: New Serbia
- Merged into: Serbian Progressive Party
- Ideology: National conservatism; Agrarianism; Regionalism
- Political position: Right-wing
- National affiliation: Together We Can Do Everything
- Colours: Red; Blue
- Slogan: Mi znamo bolje ("We know better")

Website
- boljasrbija.org.rs

Better Serbia (Serbian Cyrillic: Боља Србија, romanized: Bolja Srbija, BS) was a national-conservative political party in Serbia. Its leader was Dragan Jovanović, a former member of New Serbia. It was the main governing party in the municipality of Topola.

== Origins and current status ==
Jovanović was a longtime member of New Serbia (NS) before his expulsion from the party in January 2017, which occurred against the backdrop of a quarrel with party leader Velimir Ilić. Jovanović was elected on Serbian Progressive Party's (SNS) list in 2016, and after serving as an independent member of the assembly for six months, Jovanović launched Better Serbia in July 2017. A month before the formation, Jovanović presented a political program with Vladan Glišić and Miroslav Parović. He outlined the party's positions in an interview with Politika shortly thereafter, noting the party's focus on agrarian issues. Jovanović was a supporter of Serbian president Aleksandar Vučić at the time of Better Serbia's establishment, although by 2020 he had become an opponent of the administration.

Better Serbia contested the 2020 Serbian parliamentary election in an alliance with Healthy Serbia. Their list did not cross the electoral threshold to win representation in the assembly. Better Serbia won a narrow victory in Jovanović's home community of Topola in the concurrent 2020 Serbian local elections, defeating the Serbian Progressive Party by sixteen seats to fifteen. After the election, the Progressives formed a new governing alliance with smaller parties in the local assembly, and Better Serbia served in opposition. In April 2021, however, two defectors from the Progressives allowed Better Serbia to form a new municipal administration with the support from the Movement for the Restoration of the Kingdom of Serbia. Topola's incumbent mayor, Ivan Petrović, also chose to join the new administration.

On 14 February 2022, Dragan Jovanović announced that BS will participate in the 2022 Serbian parliamentary elections as part of the SNS-led coalition and their "Together We Can Do Everything" ballot list. On 12 April 2023, BS merged into SNS.

== Presidents of Better Serbia ==
#	President	Born-Died	Term start	Term end
1	Dragan Jovanović	1976–	24 July 2017	12 April 2023

== Electoral performance ==
=== Parliamentary elections ===
National Assembly of Serbia
Year	Leader	Popular vote	% of popular vote	#	# of seats	Seat change	Coalition	Status	Ref.
2020	Dragan Jovanović	33,435	1.08%	▲11th	0 / 250	▼1	BS–ZS	Extra-parliamentary	
2022	Dragan Jovanović	1,635,101	44.27%	▲1st	1 / 250	▲1	ZMS	Support	

=== Presidential elections ===
President of Serbia
Year	Candidate	1st round popular vote		% of popular vote	2nd round popular vote		% of popular vote	Notes	Ref.
2022	Aleksandar Vučić	1st	2,224,914	60.01%	—N/a	—	—	Supported Vučić	

== See also ==
- List of political parties in Serbia
