= 2017 Serbian presidential election =

Presidential election in Serbia

- 2 April 2017

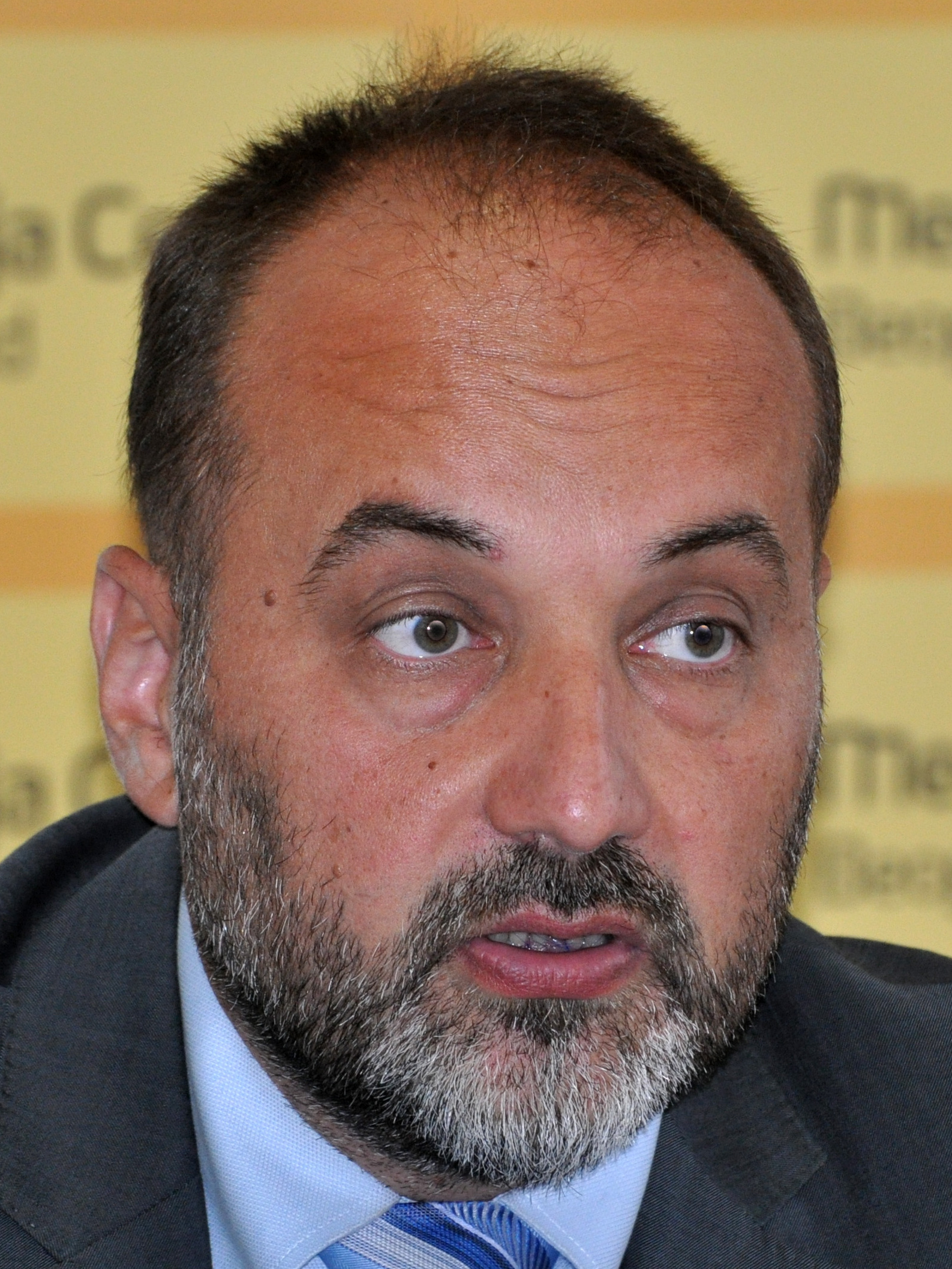

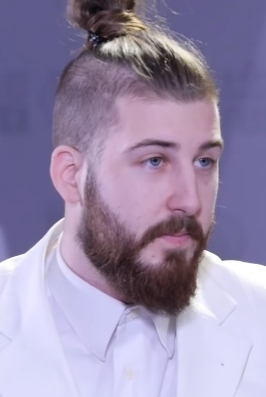

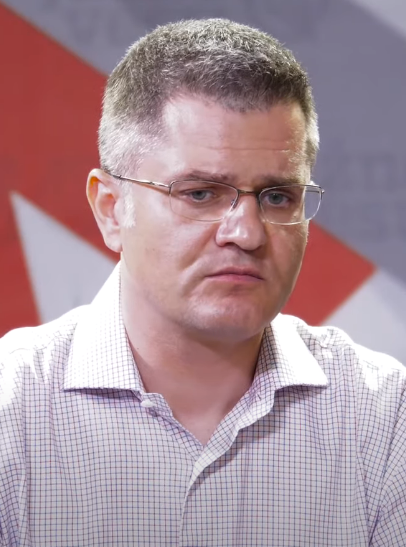
Candidate	Aleksandar Vučić	Saša Janković
Party	SNS	Independent
Alliance	Serbia is Winning	For Serbia Without Fear
Popular vote	2,012,788	597,728
Percentage	56.01%	16.63%
Candidate	Luka Maksimović	Vuk Jeremić
Party	Independent	Independent
Alliance	Beli – Just Strong	We Have to Do Better
Popular vote	344,498	206,676
Percentage	9.59%	5.75%
- Election results by each municipality of Serbia: Vučić Janković Stamatović Election not held
President before election
Tomislav Nikolić
Independent
Elected President
Aleksandar Vučić
SNS

Presidential elections were held in Serbia on 2 April 2017. Incumbent president Tomislav Nikolić was eligible to run for a second five-year term, but opted not to do so. Prime Minister Aleksandar Vučić was elected president in the first round.

The election was marred by accusations of voter intimidation and a near total domination of the Serbian media by Vučić and his party. Following the announcement of the results, protests were held across Serbia against Vučić's victory. The OSCE have announced that there are reports of pressure on employees of state and state-affiliated institutions to support Vučić and secure, in a cascade fashion, support from subordinate employees, family members, and friends.

The OSCE report noted that general reluctance of media to report critically on or to challenge the governing authorities significantly reduced the amount of impartial information available to voters, that all private national television channels displayed preferential treatment towards Vučić in their news programmes, and that public resources were used in support of Vučić, including endorsements and favourable articles in municipal information material. The European Commission stated in its Serbia 2018 report that the Regulatory Body for Electronic Media had failed to address imbalances in media coverage during the presidential campaign. The Associated Press and Reporters Without Borders reported that Aleksandar Vučić, the candidate of the governing coalition, had ten times more airtime on national broadcasters than all other candidates combined and that mainstream media under Vučić's control have been demonizing most of the opposition presidential candidates, without giving them the opportunity to respond. This practice was different compared to the previous elections, when the two main candidates had approximately the same media coverage. Non-governmental organizations involved in election observation, CRTA and Bureau for Social Research, emphasized that the presence of Aleksandar Vučić in newspaper and the electronic media during presidential campaign was disproportionate, adding that media have lost their critical role and that they have become a means of political propaganda.

== Electoral system ==
The President of Serbia is elected for a five-year term using the two-round system. Incumbent President's term is scheduled to expire on 31 May.

== Candidates ==
Serbia's Electoral Commission confirmed eleven candidates. Candidate numbers were decided using a random draw on 17 March.

#	Candidate	Party affiliation	Background	Signatures
1	Saša Janković	Independent	Former Serbian national Ombudsman (2007–2017); his first presidential nomination.	17,134
2	Vuk Jeremić	Independent	Former Minister of Foreign Affairs (2007–2012) and former President of the United Nations General Assembly (2012–2013); his first presidential nomination.	14,360
3	Miroslav Parović	NSP	President of the People's Freedom Movement; his first presidential nomination.	10.390
4	Saša Radulović	DJB	President of the Enough is Enough party, former Minister of Economy (2013–2014); his first presidential nomination.	10,579
5	Luka Maksimović	Independent	The leader of a parody party Sarmu probo nisi (SPN); his first presidential nomination.	12,270
6	Aleksandar Vučić	SNS	Former Prime Minister of Serbia (2014–2017), former Minister of Information (1998–2000), and Minister of Defence (2012–2013); his first presidential nomination.	56,516
7	Boško Obradović	Dveri	President of the Dveri party; his first presidential nomination.	11,212
8	Vojislav Šešelj	SRS	Founder and president of the Serbian Radical Party; his sixth presidential nomination.	12,970
9	Aleksandar Popović	DSS	Former Minister of Science and Environmental Protection (2004–2007) and Minister of Energy and Mining (2007–2008); his first presidential nomination.	10,504
10	Milan Stamatović	Independent	President of Čajetina municipality since 2004; his first presidential nomination.	12,027
11	Nenad Čanak	LSV	President of League of Social Democrats of Vojvodina; his first presidential nomination.	11,004

== Opinion polls ==
Date	Polling Firm	Vučić SNS*	Janković Ind.	Šešelj SRS	Jeremić Ind.	Obradović Dveri	Maksimović Ind.	Popović DSS	Stamatović Ind.	Parović NSP	Čanak LSV	Radulović DJB	Lead
Results		55.06	16.35	4.48	5.65	2.28	9.42	1.04	1.15	0.32	1.12	1.41	38.74
30 Mar	NSPM	52.8	12.1	7.4	9.4	3.0	8.6	1.3	0.7	0.4	1.3	3.0	40.7
30 Mar	Ipsos	54.3	12.8	6.5	6.8	3.2	9.5	–	–	–	1.1	1.8	41.5
29 Mar	Demostat	56.2	8.9	8.8	9.3	<3.0	9.5	<3.0	<3.0	<3.0	<3.0	<3.0	46.7
25 Mar	Faktor Plus	53.3	15.1	5.5	8.6	2.8	7.5	<3.0	2.0	<3.0	<3.0	<3.0	38.2
23 Mar	CeSID	53.0	14.0	10.0	12.0	–	5.0	–	–	–	–	–	39.0
22 Mar	Ninamedia	50.0	12.5	7.1	7.2	<5.0	11.9	<5.0	<5.0	<5.0	<5.0	<5.0	37.5
18 Mar	Ipsos	53.0	10.6	8.7	6.9	3.5	11.0	1.1	1.5	0.3	1.7	1.7	42.0
17 Mar	Demostat	57.0	11.0	8.0	9.0	3.0	3.0	<3.0	<3.0	<3.0	<3.0	<3.0	46.0
16 Mar	NSPM	54.9	10.8	7.0	11.1	3.3	7.9	0.9	0.7	0.4	1.0	2.1	43.8
7 Mar	Faktor Plus	53.1	14.5	11.0	11.1	3.9	–	–	2.0	–	<2.0	2.4	38.6
28 Feb	Ipsos	52.3	13.9	11.0	13.3	3.7	–	0.8	0.8	–	1.7	–	38.4

* Also nominating: SPS, SDPS, JS, PUPS, PS, SPO, PSS – BK, SVM

=== Voter demographics ===
A public opinion survey, carried out by CeSID showed that significant proportions of Vučić supporters, the candidate of the governing coalition, were composed of pensioners (41%) and that the vast majority (63%) held a secondary education degree, while 21% did not complete high school. The average age of his supporters was 55 years.

The second most popular candidate, Janković, had slightly more women among his potential voters, who were on average 45 years old. The vast majority of his supporters (59%) had completed higher education. In addition, he was supported by the majority of diaspora voters.

== Conduct ==
The election was marred by accusations of voter intimidation and a near total domination of the Serbian media by Vučić and his party. Following the announcement of the results, protests were held across Serbia against Vučić's victory. There were several issues. First, the electoral campaign was short only fulfilling minimal requirement of 30 days, despite the fact that these were regular elections. Also, until the last day it was unclear if there would be only parliamentary elections or parliamentary and City of Belgrade elections which hampered electoral strategies of opposition candidates. Furthermore, the governing majority made a decision to dissolve the parliament during the campaign, which was not justified and badly hurt visibility of opposition.

There were also a problems with imperfect electoral registers recorded which was similar as with previous elections. Controversy also arose regarding financing of electoral campaigns. Independent Investigative journalists reported that up to 6879 individual donors have provided Aleksandar Vučić's campaign with exactly 40.000 RSD each, which is near maximum amount and individual can contribute.

The OSCE have announced that there are reports of pressure on employees of state and state-affiliated institutions to support Vučić and secure, in a cascade fashion, support from subordinate employees, family members, and friends.

On 3 April 2017, the Republican Electoral Commission announced that the election results from two polling stations in Bačka Palanka and Zrenjanin would be annulled and followed by a repeat vote at those stations on 11 April. This was due to reports of electoral fraud. The following day, the election results were annulled in a further six municipalities, with re-runs also scheduled for 11 April. The repeat vote in the eight municipalities could not change the outcome of the elections, as there were only 9,851 voters who are eligible to vote, fewer than Vučić's margin of victory.

In Novi Pazar, where Vučić recorded 74.43% of the vote, Sead Biberović from the Novi Pazar-based NGO called "Urban-IN" claimed that there were "serious crimes committed at multiple polling stations," and that "some people went from station to station, where they threatened, used ransoms, and lied". Rešad Hodžić, who was Saša Janković's campaign representative in Novi Pazar, claimed that "30,000 lists were prepared in the trunks of cars circulating between polling places, in an attempt to be cast into the voting boxes." He said that the Janković campaign workers did as much as they could to stop electoral fraud, going on to say:

"In polling station #90, activists of the Party of Democratic Action of Sandžak gave poll workers 5,000 dinars each in order to submit 500 votes for Vučić, which they accepted. In the end, Vučić recorded 532 votes at that polling station. In Vranovina they offered 400 euros to submit 200 votes. For all of this we have witnesses and averments."

On 3 April, following the announcement of Vučić's victory, a student protest formed in front of the Serbian National Assembly, which, according to Danas, was attended by over 10,000 people. Protests after the election results were announced emerged in 15 cities throughout Serbia.

=== Media freedom ===
The Associated Press and Reporters Without Borders reported that Aleksandar Vučić, the candidate of the governing coalition, had ten times more airtime on national broadcasters than all other candidates combined and that mainstream media under Vučić's control have been demonizing most of the opposition presidential candidates, without giving them the opportunity to respond. This practice was different compared to the previous elections, when the two main candidates had approximately the same media coverage. Non-governmental organizations involved in election observation, CRTA and Bureau for Social Research, emphasized that the presence of Aleksandar Vučić in newspaper and the electronic media during presidential campaign was disproportionate, adding that media have lost their critical role and that they have become a means of political propaganda.

The OSCE report noted that general reluctance of media to report critically on or to challenge the governing authorities significantly reduced the amount of impartial information available to voters, that all private national television channels displayed preferential treatment towards Vučić in their news programmes, and that public resources were used in support of Vučić, including endorsements and favourable articles in municipal information material. The European Commission stated in its Serbia 2018 report that the Regulatory Body for Electronic Media had failed to address imbalances in media coverage during the presidential campaign.

One day before the beginning of the election silence, seven major newspapers covered their entire front pages with adverts for Vučić. Slaviša Lekić, president of the Independent Journalist Association of Serbia said "With this, Aleksandar Vučić clearly demonstrated that he can control over everything in this country." Vučić was the subject of criticism and satire for the appearance of a show on Happy TV in the last days of the campaign, with guests including his parents, in which he offered assistance in front of the camera to a man who allegedly fainted.

== Results ==
As Vučić received more than 50% of the vote in the first round, no second round was held.

Candidate	Party	Votes	%
Aleksandar Vučić	Serbian Progressive Party	2,012,788	56.01
Saša Janković	Independent	597,728	16.63
Luka Maksimović	Independent (Sarmu probo nisi)	344,498	9.59
Vuk Jeremić	Independent	206,676	5.75
Vojislav Šešelj	Serbian Radical Party	163,802	4.56
Boško Obradović	Dveri	83,523	2.32
Saša Radulović	Enough is Enough	51,651	1.44
Milan Stamatović	Independent	42,193	1.17
Nenad Čanak	League of Social Democrats of Vojvodina	41,070	1.14
Aleksandar Popović	Democratic Party of Serbia	38,167	1.06
Miroslav Parović	People's Freedom Movement	11,540	0.32
Total		3,593,636	100.00
Valid votes		3,593,636	98.35
Invalid/blank votes		60,378	1.65
Total votes		3,654,014	100.00
Registered voters/turnout		6,724,949	54.34
Source: OCSE
