= Ljubiš =

- Village
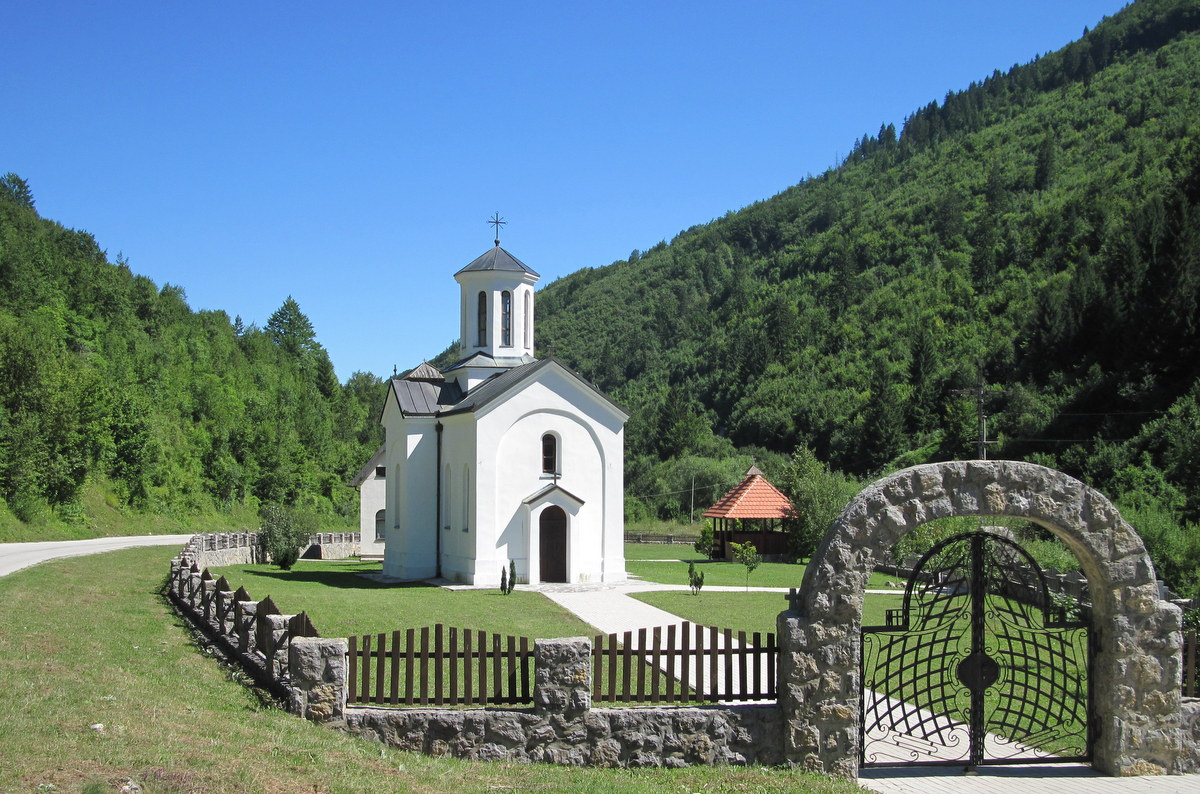
- Church

- Location within Serbia
- Coordinates: 43°37′N 19°51′E
- Country: Serbia
- District: Zlatibor District
- Municipality: Čajetina

Area
  - Total: 53.54 km^{2} (20.67 sq mi)
- Elevation: 882 m (2,894 ft)

Population (2011)
  - Total: 515
  - Density: 9.62/km^{2} (24.9/sq mi)
- Time zone: UTC+1 (CET)
  - Summer (DST): UTC+2 (CEST)

Ljubiš is a village in the municipality of Čajetina, western Serbia. According to the 2011 census, the village has a population of 515 people.Famous poet Ljubivoje Ršumović was born in this village. One river that flows here in Ljubiš is called Ljubišnjica.

== Notable people ==
- Ljubivoje Ršumović, poet
- Milutin Kukanjac, Yugoslav People's Army General
