= Milan Stamatović =

Serbian politician

- Милан Стаматовић
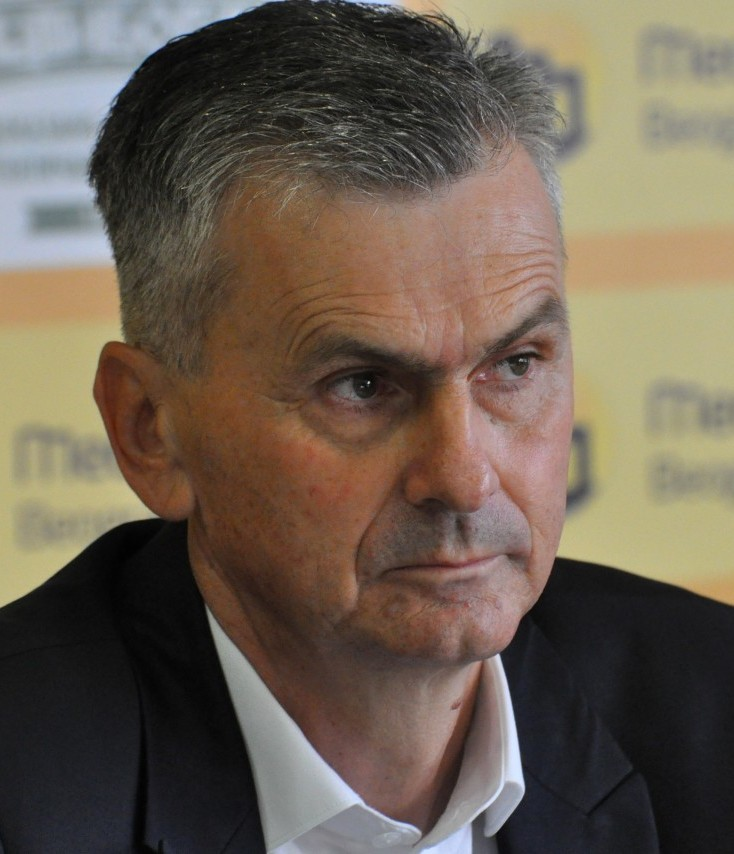
- Stamatović in 2018

President of the Municipality of Čajetina
- Incumbent
- Assumed office 2004
- Preceded by: Radovan Jojić

Personal details
- Born: 24 May 1960 (age 65) Čajetina, PR Serbia, FPR Yugoslavia
- Party: DEPOS (1996–2000); DSS (2000–2014); SNP (2014–2016); Independent (2016–2017); ZS (2017–present)
- Children: Ivana Stamatović

Milan Stamatović (Serbian Cyrillic: Милан Стаматовић, pronounced [mǐlan stǎmatoʋit͜ɕ]; born 24 May 1960) is a Serbian politician who has been the president of the municipality of Čajetina since 2004. He was an independent candidate in the 2017 Serbian presidential election. Since 2017, he has led the Healthy Serbia party.

== Political career ==
=== Early career and campaigns ===
From 1996 to 2000, Stamatović was a member of the Democratic Movement of Serbia in opposition to Slobodan Milošević. In 2000, he joined the Democratic Party of Serbia, which he represented until 2014. In 2014, Stamatović, Nenad Popović, and others left DSS to form the Serbian People's Party. In Čajetina's municipal election in April 2016, Stamatović campaigned with the support of a DSS-PUPS-SNP coalition and was elected to his fourth mandate with 56.33% of the vote, resulting in a rare loss of the state-ruling SNS.

=== Municipal presidency of Čajetina ===
In the summer of 2007, the local police chief in Čajetina resigned amidst a crisis in which the police could not regulate illegal construction in the municipality. When Stamatović planned to have dozens of illegal buildings knocked down, he received several threats. In an investigative report, Stamtović told Danas:

"As an attractive tourist destination, Zlatibor is acceptable for criminals from Serbia, Montenegro, Bosnia and Herzegovina. In night clubs, in which people from the Serbian or Montenegrin underground meet up, guns are transferred, drugs are consumed, and the owners of the clubs are so afraid for their safety that they cannot report to the police."

Stamatović's predecessor for municipal president, Radovan Jojić from the opposing Democratic Party, gave a similar testament to Danas that during his mandate (2000-2004), people were given permission to build apartments of a certain capacity, but that those capacities were overwhelmingly ignored. In May 2009, Večernje novosti published another investigative article about Zlatibor featuring Stamatović, who told Novosti that "no matter how much the government denies the existence of the [illegal] construction mafia, I'm confirming that it exists." The same report asserted that Serbian criminal Sreten Jocić bought several properties in Zlatibor, and that Bosko Radonjich was the owner of a local bar called "Boss".

Despite his municipality's history of underground activity, Stamatović oversaw Čajetina recording an unprecedented unemployment rate of only 7% in 2014, which was significantly below the national average at the time. That same year, the municipality of Čajetina reported a budget surplus of 150 million Serbian dinars. On May 29, 2015, the first Office for Cooperation with the Russian Federation was opened in Čajetina as a resource for Russian seasonal tourists in Zlatibor. In July 2015, the Ministry of Construction, Transport, and Infrastructure accused Stamatović of obstructing a state-sponsored cadastral survey in Čajetina. Later that summer, Stamatović formed a Local Advisory for Migrations in response to the European migrant crisis, but concluded that Čajetina "could not host migrants." In a discussion with Blic, Stamatović claimed that he "totally understands the problems of migrants", but he added his concerns in the following statements:

"We have ten families who moved from Kosovo or refugees from Croatia who have not solved their housing concerns. We provided the land on which we will build them apartments. In the past years due to political revenges Čajetina did not receive a single dinar of aid from the state, even when we suffered damages from [last year's] floods, landslides, hail, and snow. Yet the government asks us to prepare for taking in refugees from the Middle East. The state, pretending Europeanism in Europe whose values are shown building walls and barbed wire, is acting more humanly to asylum-seekers than to its own citizens. Collective centers are still full of Serbian refugees, their property stolen in Kosovo, Croatia, and Bosnia, yet the West for two decades ignores that problem.

In November 2016, Stamatović sent a publicized letter to the embassies of Russia, the United States, China, Germany, France, Switzerland, and the United Nations Development Programme, stating that Čajetina is "discriminated against and targeted by state organs". Although the letter covered a wide range of issues in southwestern Serbia, the issue which prompted Stamatović to write the letter was Serbia's anti-corruption agency SBPOK (Acronym for "Služba za borbu protiv organizovanog kriminala") controlling business in Čajetina and looking into the local government's records, which were allegedly subject to various inspections beforehand. Other grievances discussed in the letter included the government obstruction of the gondola lift planned in Zlatibor, and a warning that "the lake and 200 acres of land may fall into private hands without compensation [to the local government]."

==== Zlatibor lake affair ====
In 2016, a legal conflict developed when Stamatović sued the family of Slobodan Jeremić, whose wife had built a local bar near the waterfront of Kraljeva Voda. The family subsequently sued Stamatović for slander, and an appeals court ruled in the family's favor, concluding with a penalty of 300,000 dinars to Stamatović. However, Stamatović took the case up to the acting National Ombudsman, Saša Janković, to help protect Zlatibor's public property from the Jeremić family. Janković stated that the Serbian constitution prevented him from interfering in the ruling of the appeals court, but added that he was "impressed by the resilience with which the municipal president of Čajetina insists on the general interests of Zlatibor" and that he "fully supports Stamatović in this endeavor".

==== Zlatibor gondola crisis ====
From December 2016, Stamatović got into a conflict with Minister Zorana Mihajlović after she delayed state permits for the construction of a gondola lift in Zlatibor. In defiance of the government's delay of approval, Stamatović called for a public work action to construct the foundations of the gondola lift. The local board of the SNS accused the work action as anarchy, stating that attending the work action is "a criminal act" and punishable by up to three years in prison. In a radical change of legal terms, Stamtović replied to the SNS statement when he referred the gondola "the people's property". In spite of legal threats, approximately 2,000 volunteers came to Stamatović's work action in Zlatibor on February 11, 2017.

In January 2021 the gondola was opened and president of Serbia, Aleksandar Vučić, was present at the opening ceremony. Stamatović commented on his attendance as "the beginning of dialogue between the government and opposition".

=== 2017 presidential campaign ===
On 6 December 2016, Blic announced that Stamatović filed for candidacy in the 2017 Serbian presidential election. Although Stamatović was a member of the Serbian People's Party at the time of the announcement, the party did not officially endorse his bid for presidency, and so Stamatović started campaigning as an independent candidate. In January 2017, Stamatović confirmed that the Serbian People's Party would not endorse his candidacy for president. On March 16, 2017, Stamatović gave up his membership with the Serbian People's Party.

In a December 2016 survey by agency "Faktor Plus", Stamatović was polling at approximately 3% on the national level. However, the survey assumed that Tomislav Nikolić would run for president, which he decided not to do. On February 26, 2017, former vice-president of the Movement of Socialists Bratislav Jugović pulled out of the presidential race to endorse Stamatović.

In the presidential election, Stamatović won 1.16% of the national vote. However, he had a strong regional showing, winning 61.23% of the votes in his hometown Čajetina. In Užice, he won 17.22% of the vote.

=== Zlatibor military camp 2018 ===
Stamatović and Čajetina county supported and helped organized para-military camp "Omladinsko-patriotki kamp Zlatibor 2018" for children. The camp was closed after journalists wrote about it in 2018.

== Political positions ==
=== Decentralization ===
In an interview with Danas in September 2014, Stamatović said that one of his fundamental disagreements with DSS was on decentralization, and argued that fiscal decentralization is key to Serbia's economic recovery. Stamatović lobbied intensely for the re-opening of Ponikve Airport in Užice to commercial flights. In an essay called "Together for the Airport", he argued that Western Serbia is isolated with the lack of a functioning airport, and that the region is too cut off from Belgrade and Pan-European Corridor X to attract more tourists from foreign countries. While president of the municipality of Čajetina, Stamatović proposed that his municipality could contribute up to €100,000 per year for the operation of Ponikve Airport, even though the airport is located in a neighboring city. He proposed the contribution in coordination with the City of Užice and eight other municipalities who offered to contribute an annual sum to Ponikve Airport.

=== Foreign policy ===
==== European Union ====
In December 2016, Stamatović proposed that on the day of the 2017 Serbian presidential election, that a referendum be held on whether voters want Serbia to enter the European Union or not. The proposal was generally well received among Serbian pundits, although the chief editor of The New Serbian Political Thought Đorđe Vukadinović commented that it was unlikely for Aleksandar Vučić to allow such a referendum given his appeal to pro-EU voters.

==== Kosovo ====
Stamatović criticized the Brussels Agreement during his 2017 presidential campaign, calling it "anti-Serbian". On the eighteenth anniversary of the NATO bombing of Yugoslavia, Stamatović told an audience in Smederevska Palanka that Kosovo should "be freed from occupation".
