= Saša Radulović =

Serbian politician

- Саша Радуловић
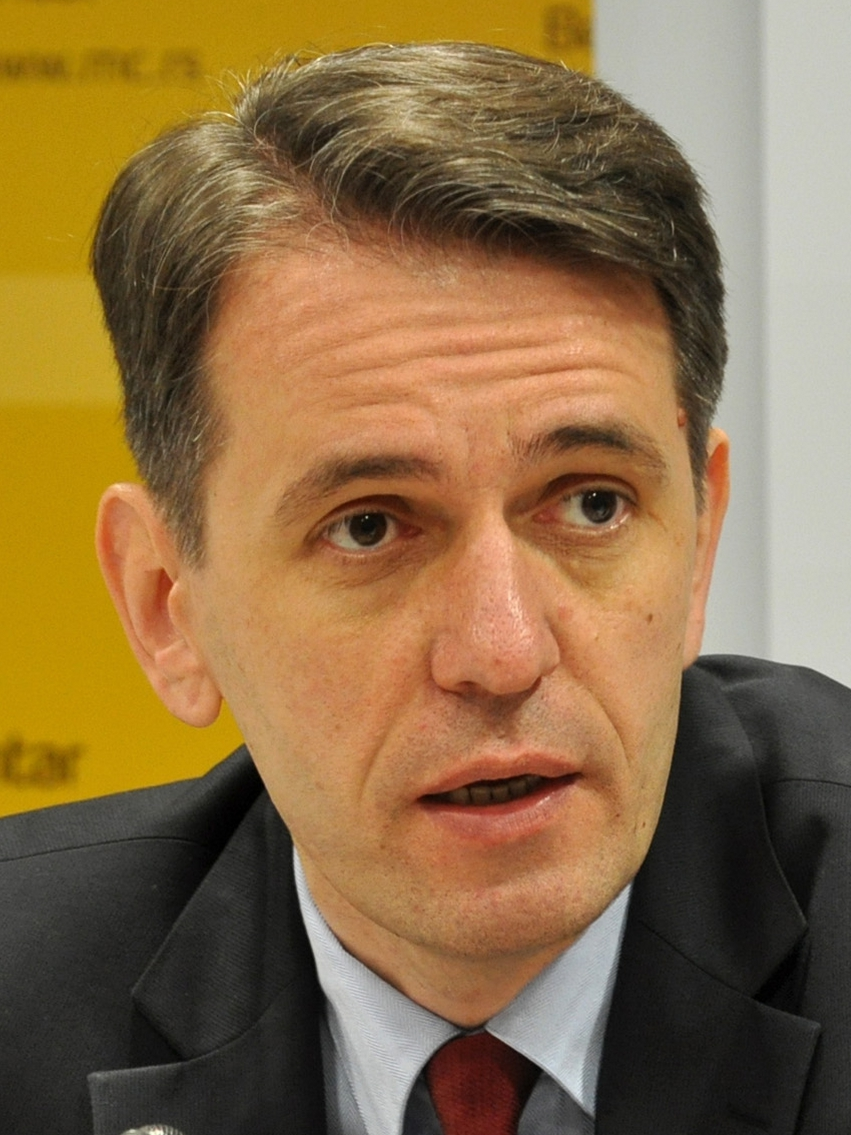
- Radulović in 2013

Member of the National Assembly
- In office 3 June 2016 – 3 June 2020
- President: Maja Gojković

Minister of Economy
- In office 2 September 2013 – 24 January 2014
- Prime Minister: Ivica Dačić
- Preceded by: Mlađan Dinkić
- Succeeded by: Igor Mirović (acting)

Personal details
- Born: 7 June 1965 (age 61) Bihać, SR Bosnia and Herzegovina, SFR Yugoslavia
- Party: DJB (2014–present)
- Education: University of Sarajevo
- Occupation: Tax advisor Trustee in bankruptcy
- Profession: Electronics engineer

Saša Radulović (Serbian Cyrillic: Саша Радуловић, pronounced [sâʃa radǔːloʋit͜ɕ] or [râduloʋit͜ɕ]; born 7 June 1965) is a Serbian politician and economist who served as the minister of economy from 2013 to 2014. Formerly an independent politician, he is the co-founder and president of Enough is Enough party. He ran an unsuccessful campaign for president in the 2017 presidential election. He also served as a member of the National Assembly of Serbia from 2016 to 2020.

== Early life ==
Born in Bihać to a Yugoslav People's Army (JNA) officer father, Radulović graduated from the University of Sarajevo's Faculty of Electrical Engineering, specialising in automation and electronics.

In the 1980s, Radulović was part of the New Primitivism cultural movement created in Sarajevo, together with Emir Kusturica and members of the rock band Zabranjeno Pušenje. His close associate Dušan Pavlović also comes from 1980s Yugoslav pop culture, as a former member of the Belgrade-based band Vampiri.

His father, Budimir Radulović (Chief of the Army Medical Corps and other authorities), was killed on 3 May 1992 in the Yugoslav People's Army column incident in Sarajevo.

He emigrated from the Socialist Republic of Serbia at the end of the 1980s. He lived and worked in several countries, including the United States, Canada, and Germany.

== Professional career ==
In 1989, Radulović emigrated from Yugoslavia to Germany. The following year, he began working at Siemens AG on system monitoring for nuclear plants located in Germany, United States, and Russia. The job required him to move to the U.S.

In 1994, he began working in Toronto, Canada, for Antares Alliance, a subsidiary of Amdahl/EDS, as a relational database development team manager, before switching to Interpro Medical Network, initially as vice-president of development, and then as one of the members the Board of Directors. From 1997 to 2001 he was the general manager of the company dealing with servers for TrueSpectre pictures. Together with colleagues from the company, he designed the architecture and algorithms that process images on the servers. From 2002 to 2006 he was an advisor to several investment companies.

Radulović came back to Serbia from the United States in 2005, and became a pioneer blogger, writing on economics, business and tax reforms. Professionally, he owned a company and worked as bankruptcy trustee for several other companies. He is licensed as a bankruptcy trustee and portfolio manager.

Radulović worked as Advisor to the Council of Europe, OSCE, US Embassy, GIZ, NALED, and the Association of Small and Medium Enterprises. He also provided training to the Serbian police and prosecutors on how to prosecute financial crimes.

== Minister of Economy ==
In August 2013, Radulović was appointed as non-partisan Minister of Economy in the SNS-led government. During his brief tenure, he attempted to pass a new labour law package, which was initially supported by the government. Radulović's labour package proposed significant changes in labor union laws, such that labour union leaders would lose legal protections. The package also included some austerity measures, such as allowing employers to reduce compensation for annual leave, and for the reduction of sick leave provided that a bonus is paid during the year. The package was intensely opposed by Serbian labour union leaders, as the Federation of Independent Unions and the United Branch Union "Independence" both called for Radulović to resign due to his proposals. However, in January 2014, the government scrapped the Radulović package and began re-drafting. As a result of the government's rejection of his package, Radulović resigned from his position as Minister.

He came to the fore for a text in the magazine Nedeljnik in which he fiercely criticised their former economic policy in Serbia, including the privatisation process and the associated corruption. The text is often cited not only in Serbian, but also in the media other former Yugoslav states. He was openly criticised by Prime Minister Aleksandar Vučić when he resigned. Radulović resigned from the post of Minister filed on 24 January 2014.

== Political career ==
On 2 February 2014, Radulović announced that he would participate in the parliamentary elections on 16 March 2014 with his own list. His movement Dosta je bilo (Enough is Enough) garnered 74,973 votes (2.09%), remaining below the 5% threshold. His list had been the only one to publish a consolidated electoral programme with action plans on different policy areas.

At the 2016 Serbian parliamentary election, his movement Dosta je bilo tripled its support and with 6.02% of votes it obtained 16 seats. Radulović became a member of the parliament and the leader of the Enough is Enough parliamentary group.

=== 2017 presidential campaign ===
Radulović initially did not prioritise running for president, as he first proposed that Saša Janković and Vuk Jeremić come to an agreement on a "united candidate" against Aleksandar Vučić. In his case for uniting the opposition, Radulović argued that "Enough is Enough is the leader of the center, Vuk Jeremić is the new leader of the right of center, and Saša Janković - left of center." Večernje Novosti reported that Janković rejected the offer, while Jeremić's campaign allegedly did not respond. On 2 March 2017, Radulović announced his candidacy for the Serbian presidential election, only a month before the election. A week before the election, Nedeljnik published an essay written by Radulović, titled "When I become president", in an appeal to the voters. In the essay, he argued against party employment and outlines some of his ideas on welfare and taxes:

"When we stop the robbery through party employment and subsidies, when we consider the parasitical system which destroys us, we will be able to bring back the taken pensions, raise payments for education workers, for the army, police, and public sector, reduce taxes by a third for the economy to breathe, we will be able to instate a universal social protection and guaranteed basic pensions for all citizens in Serbia who turn 65 years old. We want a human and responsible society which cares about its citizens."

Radulović ended up with 1.41% of the national vote. Vladimir Vuletić, a sociology professor at the University of Belgrade, commented that "after last year's parliamentary election, it seemed that [Radulović] represented some kind of future of the opposition. Now that ambition and hope has completely collapsed."

== Economic views ==
Although Radulović was not able to pass his ideas through the government during his tenure as Minister of Economy, he elaborated on his economic views for B92's blog in June 2013, in a post called "Which economic measures do we need?". His post had seven sections, each devoted to a different topic. In the first section, titled "How to save the economy", he summarised some of his key points with the following:

"We don't need re-industrialization. We don't need subsidies. We don't need the state to invest into the economy. Only in infrastructure. Abolish National Investment Plans (NIP) for good."

Later in the first section, he said that there should be "draconic" consequences for false financial reporting. He argued that all businesses in reconstruction should be sent to bankruptcy, except for public companies, for whom he wrote a deadline of three months should be given to list their financial responsibilities and their assets in exchange for reconstruction. He wrote that the Republic of Serbia's Fund for Development should be abolished, and argued against the creation of a development bank in Serbia. He wrote in favour of investment funds as an alternative to a development bank, and that the state should "offer them a portion of capital" in exchange for their investments. The first section was concluded with criticism for monopolies and corporate merging in Serbia.

In the second section, he wrote about tax policy and compensation in public companies. He wrote that salaries in public companies should be reduced by 10 to 20 per cent assuming no workers are laid off. However, Radulović wrote that if workers are laid off, any salary reduction should take the layoffs in account such that the more layoffs, the less reductions in salary should be made. He called for the lowest tier of the value-added tax to be raised from 8% to 10%. For corporations, he wrote that taxes on corporate profits should be raised from 15% to 20%.

== Political positions ==
In the beginning of his political career he was known for moderately liberal political and economic positions. Since 2018 and hiatus in the movement, his positions have taken a hard turn toward conservatism, identitarianism and alt-right ideology. Since early 2019 he and members of the movement refer to themselves as "Suverenisti", which loosely translates to sovereign citizen. He is strongly opposed to Middle Eastern immigrants being granted asylum in Serbia, commonly expresses heavy criticism of the Serbian mainstream media, calling them "propaganda channels" and "the enemy of the Serbian people, the state and democracy", and often accuses political opponents of treason and collaboration with "occupiers and colonizers".

He has been described a nationalist, anti-vaxxer and as opposed to immigration.

=== Breakup of Yugoslavia ===
In an interview with Nedeljnik from April 2016, Radulović talked about his childhood in Bosnia, his father's death in a confrontation by the Army of the Republic of Bosnia and Herzegovina, and war crimes. When commenting on the Bosnian War, he talked about the denial and justification of war crimes in the Balkans:

"Something that hurts me the most out of all of this is when any side tries to justify a war crime with another war crime. And then remark, 'This war crime did happen, but that was because there was another war crime'. That's not human. Every war crime is individual. For every war crime those responsible must be found and punished. And not just for the victims' families, but for society as a whole...when I recognize war crimes committed by those who presented themselves as the Serbian side, in that moment I will not speak about war crimes done unto us [Serbs]. If we do that, we are trivializing war crimes."

On 6 March 2018, Radulović resigned the post of the President of the Enough is Enough movement. However, he reassumed the post of movement's president in October 2019.

=== COVID-19 pandemic ===
Radulović is one of the most vocal critics of the approach to the COVID-19 pandemic taken by the Serbian government as well as most other world governments, calling mask mandates and lockdowns imposed by the Serbian and other governments a threat to civil liberties while also often accusing the mainstream media of spreading fear and hysteria by portraying the SARS‑CoV‑2 virus as far more dangerous than it objectively is. He has also made claims that COVID-19 vaccination is the cause of the late 2020 and early 2021 global wave of infections, challenged beliefs that mass immunisation is the only way to end the pandemic and questioned the origins of the virus, leading critics to label him an anti-vaxxer and conspiracy theorist. Radulović has repeatedly dismissed these labels and claims that he and his political movement are neither denying the dangers of the virus nor arguing against vaccination, but merely advocating freedom of choice and stricter testing and control of vaccines before they are approved for use.

== Personal life ==
Radulović has two children. Apart from his native Serbian language, he speaks English and German. Although Radulović was born in Bihać, he grew up in Sarajevo, where he lived until 1989 when he emigrated to Germany. His daughter Ana died in 2024.

Political offices
Preceded by Mlađan Dinkić	Minister of Economy of Serbia; 2013–2014	Succeeded by Igor Mirović (acting)
Party political offices
Preceded by New office Branka Stamenković(acting)	President of the Enough is Enough; 2014–2018; 2019–	Succeeded by Branislav Mihajlović; Incumbent
