= 2022 Serbian constitutional referendum =

- 16 January 2022
- Are you in favour of confirming the act on changing the Constitution of the Republic of Serbia?

Results
Choice	Votes	%
Yes	1,189,460	60.24%
No	785,163	39.76%
Valid votes	1,974,623	98.97%
Invalid or blank votes	20,592	1.03%
Total votes	1,995,215	100.00%
Registered voters/turnout	6,510,323	30.65%
- Results by municipality

A constitutional referendum was held in Serbia on 16 January 2022, in which voters decided on changing the Constitution in the part related to the judiciary.

To bring the judiciary into line with European Union legislation, the government of Serbia had previously proposed changing the way judges and prosecutors are elected; the National Assembly adopted it by a two-thirds majority on 7 June 2021, shortly after the parliamentary election in which the ruling Serbian Progressive Party (SNS) won a supermajority of seats. The proclamation of the referendum was preceded by the adoption of changes to the law on referendum and people's initiative, which was initially supposed to get implemented shortly after the enactment of the 2006 constitution. The law, which was met with opposition from non-governmental organisations and activists, abolished the 50% turnout that was required for referendums to be considered valid. President Aleksandar Vučić amended the law following the escalation of environmental protests in December 2021.

Proposed changes included the elimination of several offices, expansion of the public prosecutor's office into a collective body, and changes regarding the election of judges. Government officials stated their support for such changes, while the opposition remained divided; most stated their objection to the referendum while some even called for a boycott or for the referendum to be postponed. Voters voted in favour of changes in the referendum, although the turnout was reported to be the lowest since 1990, at only 30% of voters in total. Non-governmental organisations reported irregularities at polling stations and had also claimed voter fraud. Constitutional changes were adopted by the National Assembly on 9 February.

== Background ==
In January 2020, state secretary Radomir Ilić called for the constitution to be changed to adopt "external control" (eksterna kontrola), which would give powers to the president of Serbia to appoint and remove judges. This statement was met with opposition from several former judges, who claimed it would weaken the principle of judicial independence. The justice ministry claimed that "external control would be controlled by citizens through the election of members of the High Judicial Council" (eksterna kontrola predstavljala kontrolu od strane građana kroz izbor ... članova Visokog saveta sudstva), while Ilić stated that "external control is not political" (spoljna kontrola nije politički uticaj). This suggestion was not implemented in the end.

In the June 2020 parliamentary election, the ruling Serbian Progressive Party won a supermajority of seats in the National Assembly amidst a boycott by major opposition parties. Soon after, the government of Serbia submitted a constitutional amendment to the National Assembly. The desire to implement these changes was first expressed by the government back in 2011. The implementation of said changes was planned for 2017 in the National Strategy for Judicial Reform, which was adopted by the National Assembly in 2013, and by the government in 2015. According to the document, Serbia was supposed to finish the amendments to the text of the constitution by the end of 2016. On 3 December 2020, the National Assembly adopted the proposal for the change of the constitution. Another proposal for amendment of the constitution was sent to the parliament in late April 2021, and it was accepted on 7 June 2021.

=== Law on Referendum ===
Changes to the Law on Referendum and People's Initiative, which had been on the waiting list since the implementation of the 2006 constitution, were adopted by the National Assembly on 11 November 2021. They were mainly criticised by non-governmental organisations and opposition politicians due to the abolishment of the 50% turnout for a referendum to pass, and the possibility of abusing the law on cases such as Rio Tinto. The law was passed by the National Assembly on 25 November 2021, and signed by Vučić on the same day. Following the escalation of environmental protests in late November, demonstrators demanded the law on referendum to be repealed. Vučić announced on 8 December that he would amend the law, and on 10 December, the National Assembly passed the amendments.

== Electoral system ==
The right to vote in a referendum in Serbia is held by citizens who, in accordance with the regulations on elections, reside in a territory for which the referendum is being called, and are registered in the voter list. Referendums cannot be held during a state of emergency or martial law. Citizens vote via the secret ballot method.

The government of Kosovo declined to organise the referendum on its territory, although it was later revealed that the government of Serbia did not request the referendum to be held there. Prime Minister of Kosovo Albin Kurti stated that "the referendum would not be held on Kosovo's territory", and that the Assembly of Kosovo would instead debate on 15 January whether the referendum should be held in Kosovo. The Assembly then unanimously passed a resolution which rejected holding the referendum on its territory. Serbian citizens from Kosovo were restricted to vote by mail or through the Serbian Liaison Office, although the Republic Election Commission (RIK) later announced that they would be able to vote in Kuršumlija, Raška, Vranje, and Novi Pazar. Serbian government officials stated that "it is not a surprise [to us]" (nije iznanađenje) and claimed that Kurti allegedly harasses Serbs, while the pro-SNS Serb List organised a minor protest.

The Serbian diaspora also had the right to vote, although this time, only in eleven countries including Kosovo.

== Proposed changes ==
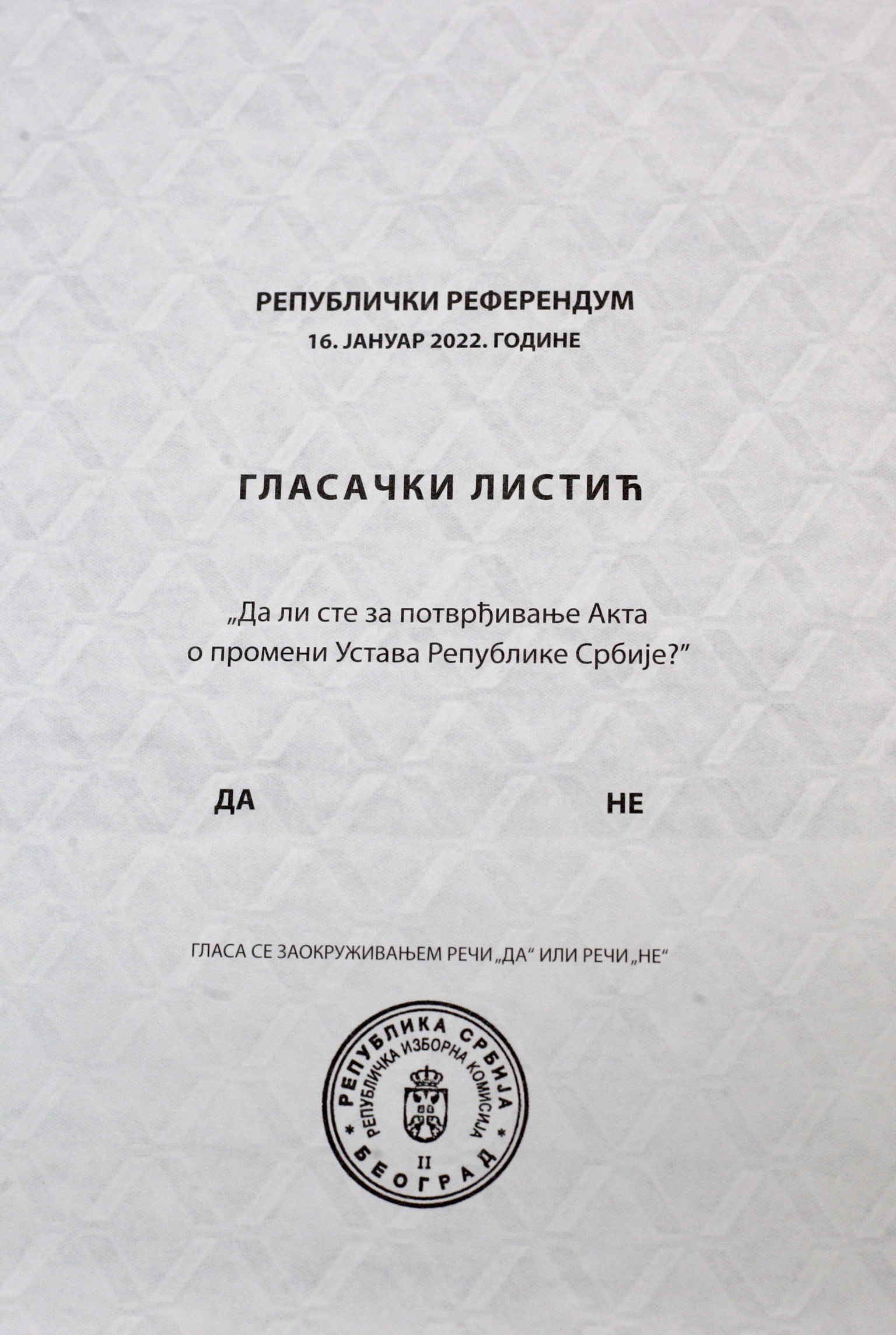
The referendum ballot contained a question and two options, "yes" and "no"

The government of Serbia had committed itself to judiciary constitutional changes in the process of joining the European Union. After several delays, the changes were first presented in a document in December 2020. For the proposed changes to be implemented, a referendum was required to take place. The president of the National Assembly Ivica Dačić stated that in case of early elections, the referendum should be held before elections. Initially, the referendum was supposed to be held in fall of 2021, although on 30 November, Dačić announced that the referendum would be held on 16 January.

The proposed constitutional changes included changes to the National Assembly's influence on the election of certain judicial factors, such as the president of the Supreme Court of Cassation, court presidents, public prosecutors, judges, and deputy public prosecutors. The National Assembly would also only elect four members of the High Judicial Council, High Prosecutorial Council, and the Supreme Public Prosecutor office. The High Judicial Council would instead get a more important role by electing all judges, while the High Prosecutorial Council would elect prosecutors. The Supreme Court of Cassation's name would also be changed to the "Supreme Court" and its work would be more regulated.

Five members of the High Council of Prosecutors would be elected by public prosecutors, four by the National Assembly on the proposal of the competent committee by a two-thirds majority, while the Supreme Public Prosecutor and Minister of Justice will be ex officio members. Judges who would take the office for the first time have a term of three years, although with these changes term limits would be abolished, and the judges would instead serve until their retirement or dismissal. The amendments also envisage the "ban on political activities of judges", and that the High Judicial Council would be an independent body that would ensure the independence of courts, judges, court presidents and lay judges. It would consist eleven members in total of which six judges would be elected by already-picked judges, four lawyers would be elected by the National Assembly, and the president of the Supreme Court. The lawyers would have to have at least 10 years of experience to be elected. The most powerful public prosecutor's office would become the Supreme Public Prosecutor's office, a collective body of all prosecutors that would be elected by the National Assembly for six years. The head of the prosecutor's office would have the possibility of issuing orders to the remaining prosecutors, but there would also be legal remedies against the authority they possess, which would exclude the possibility of abuse.

The question on the referendum paper was posed as "Are you in favor of confirming the act on changing the Constitution of the Republic of Serbia?" (Serbian Cyrillic: Да ли сте за потврђивање акта о промени Устава Републике Србије?, romanized: Da li ste za potvrđivanje akta o promeni Ustava Republike Srbije).

== Reception ==
Analysts had concluded that the turnout and success of the referendum were equally important for the government, but that due to the April general elections, the campaign for the constitutional changes would be restrained. Lawyers also noted that "the changes are good and crucial, although a possibility of abuse still exists" (izmene su dobre i ključne ali prostora za zloupotrebu i dalje ima). The European Union, including the governments of the France, Germany, Italy, United Kingdom, and United States welcomed the referendum. Additionally, Josep Borrell had called Kosovo to allow the collection of votes on its territory under the supervision of the Organization for Security and Co-operation in Europe.

=== "Yes" campaign ===
Aleksandar Vučić stated that "if the referendum does not pass, European integrations would stop for one year", while Ivica Dačić expressed his hope for the referendum to pass. On 11 January, Vučić called for citizens to vote in the referendum, and said that he would vote for the "yes" option. Prime Minister Ana Brnabić also stated her support for the "yes" option, as did political parties such as the Socialist Party of Serbia, Party of United Pensioners of Serbia, United Serbia, Justice and Reconciliation Party, and the Social Democratic Party of Serbia.

The incumbent justice minister Maja Popović, who participated in the talks and the formation of the final document, was also supportive of such changes. The Venice Commission also stated their support, and that the changes were met with most of their recommendations. Lawyer Milan Antonijević also expressed his support for the referendum.

=== "No" campaign ===
Some members of the National Assembly that were a part of the ruling parties, such as Vladimir Đukanović (SNS) and Toma Fila (SPS), voiced their opposition to the constitutional changes, as well as opposition MPs Shaip Kamberi and Vladan Glišić. Non-parliamentary parties also stated their dissatisfaction such as the Movement of Free Citizens, Do not let Belgrade drown, Together for Serbia, League of Social Democrats of Vojvodina, Social Democratic Party, New Party, Civic Democratic Forum, and Serbian Party Oathkeepers. The Democratic Party of Serbia and POKS also voiced their opposition to such changes, and called for citizens to vote "no" on the referendum. Political activists Srđan Škoro, Đorđe Vukadinović, and Boris Malagurski also stated their support for the "no" option, including several university professors.

Enough is Enough and Healthy Serbia stated their opposition to the referendum. On 30 November they formed the "Souverainist bloc", and shortly after they began their campaign. In December 2021, historian Čedomir Antić and anti-vax activist Jovana Stojković joined their campaign. They claimed that if the referendum passes, Rio Tinto would allegedly appoint their "team of judges" (tim sudija) who would overturn any decision that is in their interest, and that the judiciary would lose all of its power. They also claimed that "George Soros is behind the referendum". Dveri and Serbian Radical Party officials also stated that citizens should vote "no", and that "Serbia should not obey the demands of the European Union".

Miroslav Parović, the leader of the People's Freedom Movement, and the Liberation Movement, led by Mlađan Đorđević, had instead called for the referendum to be postponed. The Party of Freedom and Justice, Democratic Party, and Party of Democratic Action of Sandžak had called for boycott, while the People's Party stated their opposition to constitutional changes, although some People's Party individuals like Miroslav Aleksić and Vuk Jeremić were in favour of boycott, while Vladimir Gajić and Sanda Rašković Ivić had stated to vote for the "no" option.

=== Overall positions ===
Position	Name	Ideology	Leader(s)
Yes	Serbian Progressive Party (SNS)	Populism	Aleksandar Vučić
Yes	Socialist Party of Serbia (SPS)	Populism	Ivica Dačić
Yes	United Serbia (JS)	National conservatism	Dragan Marković
Yes	Party of United Pensioners of Serbia (PUPS)	Pensioners' interests	Milan Krkobabić
Yes	Justice and Reconciliation Party (SPP)	Bosniak minority interests	Usame Zukorlić
Yes	Social Democratic Party of Serbia (SDPS)	Social democracy	Rasim Ljajić
No	Civic Democratic Forum (GDF)	Liberalism	Zoran Vuletić
No	Democratic Party of Serbia (DSS)	National conservatism	Miloš Jovanović
No	Do not let Belgrade drown (NDB)	Eco-socialism	Dobrica Veselinović
No	Enough is Enough (DJB)	Right-wing populism	Saša Radulović
No	Healthy Serbia (ZS)	National conservatism	Milan Stamatović
No	League of Social Democrats of Vojvodina (LSV)	Autonomism	Nenad Čanak
No	Movement of Free Citizens (PSG)	Liberalism	Pavle Grbović
No	National Network (NM)	Social conservatism	Vladan Glišić
No	New Party (NOVA)	Social liberalism	Aris Movsesijan
No	POKS	National conservatism	Disputed (Note: At the time of the referendum, there were two rival groups claiming to represent the party. One group contended that Žika Gojković was the president, while the other contended that Vojislav Mihailović was the president.)
No	Party for Democratic Action (PDD)	Albanian minority interests	Shaip Kamberi
No	Serbian Movement "Dveri" (Dveri)	Serbian nationalism	Boško Obradović
No	Serbian Party Oathkeepers (SSZ)	Ultranationalism	Milica Đurđević
No	Serbian Radical Party (SRS)	Ultranationalism	Vojislav Šešelj
No	Social Democratic Party (SDS)	Social democracy	Boris Tadić
No	Together for Serbia (ZZS)	Green politics	Nebojša Zelenović
Boycott	Democratic Party (DS)	Social democracy	Zoran Lutovac
Boycott	Party of Democratic Action of Sandžak (SDA S)	Bosniak minority interests	Sulejman Ugljanin
Boycott	Party of Freedom and Justice (SSP)	Social democracy	Dragan Đilas
No/boycott	People's Party (Narodna) (Note: The People's Party stated its opposition to the constitutional changes, although, it has also stated that "citizens should decide according to their conscience whether to go and vote on the referendum". Individuals inside the party such as Miroslav Aleksić and Vuk Jeremić were in favour of boycott, while Vladimir Gajić and Sanda Rašković Ivić were in favour of voting for the "no" option.)	Liberal conservatism	Vuk Jeremić
Postpone	Liberation	National conservatism	Mlađan Đorđević
Postpone	People's Freedom Movement (NSP)	Right-wing populism	Miroslav Parović

=== Opinion polls ===
Polling organization	Date of publishment	Yes	No	Don't know	Lead
NSPM	6 January 2022	21.2	27.9	50.9	23

=== Debates ===
2022 Serbian constitutional referendum debates
Date	Time	Organisers	P Present N Non-invitee S Surrogate					
Date	Time	Organisers	SNS	SPS	UZPS	NADA	SSZ	Refs
7 December 2021	9:05 pm	RTS	P Goran Vesić	P Đorđe Milićević	P Zoran Lutovac	P Predrag Marsenić	N	
11 January 2022	9:05 pm	RTS	P Đorđe Dabić	P Đorđe Milićević	P Vladimir Gajić	N	P Milica Đurđević	

== Conduct ==
Non-governmental organisation CeSID initially reported no major incidents during the first couple of hours of voting, although later through the day, irregularities and incidents occurred at polling stations. CRTA, a non-governmental organisation, stated that "a great unpreparedness of polling stations was noticed". It was reported that a non-registered voter was allowed to cast their vote. Former MP Srđan Nogo broke a ballot box after voting and was arrested and detained soon after. Later that day, a group of activists from the "1 of 5 million" organisation were issued a warrant after they had tried to enter the building of Republic Electoral Commission. In Vršac, it was reported that the members of the Election Committee were recording the voters. In some cities across Serbia, it was also reported that members of Election Committees were adding voters who did not vote. In Novi Pazar, where 88% of the voters voted for the "yes" option, irregularities were reported in multiple polling stations across the city.

== Results ==
Polling stations were opened from 07:00 (UTC+01:00) to 20:00, and there were 6,510,233 registered voters in total. Due to the ongoing COVID-19 pandemic in Serbia and due to the increase in the number of infected, epidemiological measures were applied at polling stations. According to RIK, voters that were infected with COVID-19 were able to vote in front of their front door in an indirect contact with the voting assistant.

Shortly after 22:00, Vučić announced "preliminary results" (preliminarne rezultate) during a conference in which he stated that 60.48% votes went for the "yes" option while 39.52% went to "no". During the conference, official preliminary results were still not available to the public. He had also stated that in Belgrade 54% votes went to the "no" option. On 18 January, Vučić stated that "SNS is most capable of calculating results". According to CRTA, 29.6% of eligible voters cast their vote with "yes" winning 57.4% of the votes and "no" winning 41.6% votes. At one polling station, turnout was reported to be 100%.

The referendum turnout was initially reported to be 3.6% at 10:00, a third of the turnout seen in the 2020 parliamentary election at the same hour. The turnout was reported to be the lowest one since the re-introduction of parliamentarism in 1990. Several parties and movements such as Dveri, Enough is Enough, and 1 of 5 million had accused the government of electoral fraud. Protests which were organised by Dveri, Serbian Party Oathkeepers, Healthy Serbia, and POKS were held a day later after the referendum in front of the building of RIK. MP Vladan Glišić submitted an objection to RIK, in which he claimed that votes were falsified in 3,393 polling stations. The objection was rejected by RIK.

According to RIK, the "no" option prevailed in major cities such as Belgrade, Niš, and Novi Sad. Additionally, in the diaspora, a majority of voters voted against the proposed changes. Voting was repeated at nine polling stations on 23 January, while on 2 February voting was repeated at one polling station in Voždovac. Official results were published on 4 February.

Choice	Votes	%
For	1,189,460	60.24
Against	785,163	39.76
Total	1,974,623	100.00
Valid votes	1,974,623	98.97
Invalid/blank votes	20,592	1.03
Total votes	1,995,215	100.00
Registered voters/turnout	6,510,323	30.65
Source: RIK

== Aftermath ==
The V-Dem Institute, an independent research institute, concluded the previous year that Serbia could be categorised as an electoral autocracy. The institute had also concluded that its standards of judiciary and electoral integrity had declined in the past ten years. Analysts had concluded during the aftermath that "the results of the referendum show that there is a potential for change, but also a potential bait for the opposition", and that "the government interpreted the results more as their victory and less as a referendum solution to judiciary issues". Some had also said that "the results of the referendum suits both the government and the opposition", and that the "record low turnout raised the question of the legitimacy of constitutional changes". The National Assembly adopted the constitutional changes on 9 February. In the general elections, which were held in April 2022, Vučić won a majority of votes in the presidential election, while his Serbian Progressive Party lost its parliamentary majority. Non-governmental organisations had reported that electoral irregularities had also occurred during the election day.

=== Reactions ===
Prime Minister Brnabić congratulated citizens and added that "for the first time in recent history, Serbia will get an independent judiciary". European Union representatives had welcomed the changes. Olivér Várhelyi said that "the voters in Serbia supported the change of the constitution to strengthen the independence of the judiciary". On 25 January, Brnabić met with EU representatives to discuss about the continuation of judiciary reforms.

Miloš Jovanović and Pavle Grbović, presidents of the Democratic Party of Serbia and Movement of Free Citizens respectively, had said that "SNS was defeated in the referendum" and had pointed out that "control of polling stations will be of key importance for the 3 April elections". The Do not let Belgrade drown movement said that "future changes are possible to happen". Đorđe Vukadinović said that "the level of turnout was expected due to low public interest" and that "it is a relative victory for citizens who have shown the strength that both the government and opposition must count on". Political scientist Cvijetin Milivojević said that "the government nor the opposition won, but that the citizens lost instead".
