= Marija Leković =

Serbian politician (born 1963)

- Марија Лековић

Member of the National Assembly of the Republic of Serbia
- In office 3 August 2020 – 19 November 2020

Member of the City Council of Belgrade
- In office 20 June 2022 – 18 August 2022
- In office 13 June 2012 – 18 November 2013

Member of the City Assembly of Belgrade
- In office 23 April 2014 – 9 May 2018
- In office 6 May 2012 – 13 June 2012

Personal details
- Born: 2 June 1963 (age 63) Belgrade, SR Serbia, SFR Yugoslavia
- Party: DS (until 2014); For Our City (2014–18); SPAS (2018–21); SNS (since 2021)
- Occupation: Politician

Marija Leković (Serbian Cyrillic: Марија Лековић; born 2 June 1963) is a Serbian politician. She has served in the National Assembly of Serbia, been a deputy minister in the Serbian government, and played a prominent role in the city politics of Belgrade.

Formerly a member of the Democratic Party (DS) and the Serbian Patriotic Alliance (SPAS), Leković joined the Serbian Progressive Party (SNS) in 2021.

== Early life and career ==
Leković was born in Belgrade, in what was then the Socialist Republic of Serbia in the Socialist Federal Republic of Yugoslavia. She graduated from the University of Belgrade's Faculty of Civil Engineering with a focus in hydraulic engineering, was an employee of Stankom proing from 1992 to 1998, and worked in the Belgrade municipality of Zvezdara's department of construction and communal inspection from 1998 to 2008.

== Politician ==
=== Democratic Party ===
From 2008 to 2009, Leković was an assistant to the mayor of Zvezdara. She was appointed to the Zvezdara municipal council (i.e., the executive branch of the municipal government) on 18 March 2009 and served in this role for the remainder of the term.

Leković received the ninth position on the DS's electoral list for the Belgrade city assembly and also the third position on its list for the Zvezdara municipal assembly in the 2012 Serbian local elections. She was elected to both local parliaments when the DS alliance won fifty out of 110 seats at the city level and twenty-three out of fifty-three seats in the municipality. The party formed coalition governments at both levels, and she was re-appointed to the Zvezdara municipal council on 11 June. By virtue of accepting this position, she resigned her seat in the municipal assembly.

Two days later, on 13 June 2012, she was appointed to the Belgrade city council in Dragan Đilas's administration with responsibility for overseeing the city's traffic department. She was required to resign from the Zvezdara municipal council by virtue of accepting this position, which she did on 26 June. (She also resigned her seat in the city assembly.)

Leković was a member of the Belgrade city council until 18 November 2013, when Đilas lost a vote of non-confidence in the assembly and his administration fell. A new city election was called for early 2014; Leković received the seventh position on the DS's list and was re-elected when the list won twenty-two mandates. The Serbian Progressive Party (SNS) and its allies won the city election, and the DS served in opposition. Leković also received the 191st position on the DS's list in the concurrent 2014 Serbian parliamentary election. This was too low a position for election to be a realistic prospect, and she was not elected when the DS list won only nineteen seats.

=== Serbian Patriotic Alliance ===
Leković left the DS in November 2014 and joined Aleksandar Šapić's For Our City association. She served with Šapić's group for the remainder of the assembly term, and in January 2018 she was appointed as its representative on Belgrade's election commission. She was not a candidate in the 2018 city election.

Šapić's political movement was reconstituted as the Serbian Patriotic Alliance in July 2018, and Leković became a member of the new party. She appeared in the fourth position on the SPAS list in the 2020 parliamentary election and was elected to the national assembly when the list won eleven mandates. Her term in the assembly was brief; she resigned on 19 November 2020 and served afterward as a deputy minister in Serbia's ministry of family welfare and demography until mid-2022.

=== Serbian Progressive Party ===
In May 2021, Leković took part in negotiations that led to the Serbian Patriotic Alliance's merger into the Serbian Progressive Party.

Leković's longtime political ally Aleksandar Šapić was chosen as mayor of Belgrade on 20 June 2022, and Leković herself was re-appointed to city council on the same day. She was described as a powerful figure in Šapić's administration, with some media reports identifying her as the mayor's "right hand." Ultimately, though, her second term on city council was brief; she resigned on 18 August 2022, having been appointed to the city's planning commission.
