= Zoran Tomić =

Zoran Tomić may refer to:

- Zoran Tomić (politician) (born 1988), Serbian politician
- Zoran Tomić (footballer) (born 1989), Bosnian football player
