= Ivan Kostić (Serbian politician) =

Serbian politician

- Иван Костић

Leader of Dveri
- Incumbent
- Assumed office 29 September 2024
- Preceded by: collective leadership, previously Boško Obradović

Member of the National Assembly of the Republic of Serbia
- In office 1 August 2022 – 6 February 2024
- In office 3 June 2016 – 3 August 2020

Personal details
- Born: 15 September 1975 (age 50) Vrbas, SR Serbia, SFR Yugoslavia
- Party: Dveri

Ivan B. Kostić (Serbian Cyrillic: Иван Б. Костић; born 15 September 1975) is a Serbian politician. He has been the leader of the right-wing Dveri party since September 2024.

Kostić has served two terms in the Serbian national assembly and is currently a member of the Vrbas municipal assembly.

== Early life and career ==
Kostić was born in Vrbas, in what was then the Socialist Autonomous Province of Vojvodina in the Socialist Republic of Serbia, Socialist Federal Republic of Yugoslavia. He enrolled with the Faculty of Economics in Subotica in 1994, earned the title of graduated economist in 2002, and received a master's degree from the Faculty of Agricultural Sciences in Novi Sad in 2014. Kostić took part in regular military service with the Yugoslavian armed forces in 2002–03, has been active with Orthodox Christian organizations, and began operating his own business in 2008.

== Politician ==
Kostić joined Dveri in 2002 and was chosen as its Vojvodina coordinator in 2012, when the movement became a political party. He led Dveri's electoral list in the 2012 Vojvodina provincial election and was given the fourteenth position on its list in the concurrent 2012 Serbian parliamentary election. He later led the party's list for Vrbas in the 2013 Serbian local elections and was promoted to the tenth position in the 2014 Serbian parliamentary election. In each instance, Dveri failed to cross the electoral threshold to win assembly representation.

Dveri formed an alliance with the Democratic Party of Serbia (DSS) in early 2016, and Kostić led a combined list of the parties in the 2016 Vojvodina provincial election. Once again, the list failed to cross the threshold.

=== Parliamentarian ===
==== First term (2016–20) ====
Kostić received the thirteenth position on a combined Dveri–DSS list in the 2016 Serbian parliamentary election, which was held concurrently with the provincial vote, and was elected when the list won exactly thirteen mandates. The Serbian Progressive Party (SNS) and its allies won the election, and Dveri served in opposition in the term that followed.

Kostić became chair of the parliamentary committee on the diaspora and Serbs in the region in July 2016, on the SNS's nomination. In this capacity, he worked with Serbian community organizations in neighbouring countries, sought to initiate a public discussion on the situation of Serbs in Bosnia and Herzegovina, and helped to organize events commemorating the Serb, Jewish, and Roma victims of the Jasenovac concentration camp in World War II. He was dismissed as committee chair in May 2018. No formal explanation was given, although Dveri members said it was because of his decision to invite Russian deputy Natalia Poklonskaya from the disputed territory of Crimea to the Serbian assembly. In the same month that he was dismissed as chair, Kostić received a medal from the Russian ministry of internal affairs at Poklonskaya's recommendation for strengthening ties between Serbia and Russia.

In his first term, Kostić was also a member of the economy committee, (Note: Formally known as the Committee on the Economy, Regional Development, Trade, Tourism, and Energy.) a deputy member of the defence and internal affairs committee and the agriculture committee, (Note: Formally known as the Committee on Agriculture, Forestry, and Water Management.) a member of Serbia's delegation to the parliamentary assembly of the Black Sea Economic Cooperation, and a member of Serbia's parliamentary friendship groups with Argentina, Greece, Israel, Montenegro, Romania, and Russia.

Dveri joined an opposition boycott of the assembly in 2019 and did not participate in the 2020 parliamentary elections. In early 2020, Kostić joined Dveri leader Boško Obradović in an eleven-day hunger strike on the steps of the national assembly, accusing the Progressives and their allies of undermining Serbia's state institutions. His first assembly mandate ended on 3 August 2020.

==== Second term (2022–24) ====
The opposition boycott ended in 2022, and Dveri contested the that year's parliamentary election in an alliance with Žika Gojković's branch of the Movement for the Restoration of the Kingdom of Serbia (POKS). Kostić received the third position on their combined list and was elected to a second term when the list won ten mandates. The SNS and its allies again won the election, and Dveri served in opposition.

In August 2022, Kostić presented Dveri's ten-point platform on Kosovo and Metohija, which was highlighted by a call for Serbia to end negotiations with the European Union (EU) and the North Atlantic Treaty Organization (NATO) until the member states of those organizations withdrew their recognition of Kosovo as an independent country.

In his second term, Kostić was the deputy leader of Dveri's assembly group; a member of the diaspora committee; a deputy member of the committee on Kosovo and Metohija, the committee on the rights of child, and the agriculture committee; a member of Serbia's delegation to the parliamentary assembly of the Collective Security Treaty Organization; and a member of Serbia's friendship groups with Armenia, Belarus, Bosnia and Herzegovina, China, Cyprus, Greece, Hungary, Israel, Montenegro, North Macedonia, and Russia.

In June 2023, Kostić accused Serbian president Aleksandar Vučić of abandoning Kosovo Serbs in the ongoing North Kosovo crisis.

Dveri contested the 2023 parliamentary election in an alliance with the far-right Serbian Party Oathkeepers (SSZ), and Kostić was given the fourth position on their combined list. The list did not cross the electoral threshold, and his second term ended when the new parliament convened in February 2024. Kostić also received the symbolic 120th position out of 120 on a combined Oathkeepers–Dveri list in the concurrent 2023 Vojvodina provincial election. The list, too, failed to cross the threshold. Kostić later described the partnership with the Oathkeepers as a mistake.

In March 2024, Kostić called on the National Democratic Alternative (NADA) to initiate a new coalition of opposition right-wing parties, which he said Dveri was willing to join.

Although Dveri did not field a list in Vrbas for the 2024 Serbian local elections, Kostić appeared in the fourth position on an independent list called Let's Free Vrbas Today and was elected when the list won ten mandates. The Serbian Progressive Party and its allies won a majority of seats, and Kostić again served in opposition.

=== Party leader ===
Dveri founder Boško Obradović resigned as leader after the 2023 elections, and the party was led by a collective leadership until 29 September 2024, when Kostić was elected as Obradović's successor. In a statement released on the day of his election, Dveri pledged to support Serbia's political and economic sovereignty, uphold the traditional family structure, and protect the country's environment from what it described as the combined threat of Vučić's government and the Rio Tinto corporation.

In December 2024, against the backdrop of growing anti-corruption protests, Kostić called on Serbian citizens to put aside "all ideological and political differences" to remove Vučić from power and establish functioning state institutions. He supported the students driving the protests, saying, "They showed us that they do not want to live in a system where corruption, crime, nepotism, arrogance, negative selection, subservience and immorality of every kind reign. With them, young, smart and uncorrupted people, this country absolutely has a future!" In the same period, he said that the only way for Serbia's political crisis to end was for the Vučić administration to resign and a transitional government of experts to take its place.
