= Milan Nikolić =

Milan Nikolić may refer to:

- Milan Nikolić (footballer born 1983), Serbian football player currently playing in Kazakhstan
- Milan Nikolić (footballer, born 1987), Serbian football player currently playing for FK Moravac Orion Mrštane
- Milan Nikolić (musician) (born 1979), Serbian accordionist
- Milan Nikolić (ban) (1877–1943), Serbian brigadier general and ban (governor) of Danube Banovina
- Milan Nikolić (Serbian Radical Party politician) (born 1954), member of the National Assembly of Serbia (2008–12)
