= Milan Nikolić (Serbian Radical Party politician) =

Serbian politician

Milan Nikolić (Serbian Cyrillic: Милан Николић; born 27 August 1954) is a politician in Serbia. He served in the National Assembly of Serbia from 2008 to 2012 and was the mayor of Arilje from June to December 2015. Nikolić is a member of the far-right Serbian Radical Party (Srpska radikalna stranka, SRS).

== Private career ==
Nikolić graduated from the University of Belgrade Faculty of Mechanical Engineering in 1980. He subsequently worked at the Ivanjica Carpet Industry, and in 1989 he began working at Proleter Arilje.

== Politician ==
=== Early years (2000–08) ===
Nikolić ran for the Arilje municipal assembly in the 2000 Serbian local elections, seeking election in the municipality's third division. Like all Radical Party candidates in the municipality during this cycle, he was defeated. (This was the last regular local election cycle in Serbia in which candidates were elected in single-member constituencies. All subsequent local elections have been held under proportional representation.)

The 2000 Serbian local elections took place concurrently with the 2000 Yugoslavian general election, in which incumbent president Slobodan Milošević was defeated by Vojislav Koštunica. This was a watershed moment in Serbian and Yugoslavian politics; the government of Serbia fell after the election, and a new Serbian general election was called for December 2000. For this election, Serbia's electoral laws were changed such that the entire country was counted as a single electoral district and all mandates were awarded to candidates on successful lists at the discretion of the sponsoring parties and coalitions, irrespective of numerical order. Nikolić received the 143rd position on the Radical Party's electoral list; the list won twenty-three seats, and he was not given a mandate. He later appeared in the 232nd position on the party's list in the 2003 parliamentary election and was again not given a mandate when the list won eighty-two seats.

Serbia introduced the direct election of mayors for the 2004 Serbian local elections; Nikolić was the Radical Party's candidate in Arilje and was eliminated in the first round of voting. He was, however, elected to the local assembly when Radical Party's list won five seats. The direct election of mayors was subsequently abandoned, and in 2008 Serbia returned to having mayors chosen by the elected members of city and municipal assemblies.

=== Parliamentarian (2008–12) ===
Nikolić received the eighty-fifth position on the Radical Party's list in the 2008 parliamentary election. The list won seventy-eight seats, and he was on this occasion given a mandate in the assembly. The overall results of the election were inconclusive, but the For a European Serbia (Za evropsku Srbiju, ZES) alliance ultimately formed an alliance with the Socialist Party of Serbia (Socijalistička partija Srbije, SPS), and the Radicals served in opposition. Nikolić was also re-elected to the Arilje municipal assembly in the concurrent 2008 local elections as the leader of the Radical Party list.

The Radical Party experienced a serious split later in 2008, with several members joining the more moderate Serbian Progressive Party (Srpsks napredna stranka, SNS) under the leadership of Tomislav Nikolić and Aleksandar Vučić. Milan Nikolić remained with the Radicals. In parliament, he was the deputy chair of the committee on development and foreign economic relations, a member of the committee on economic reforms, and a member of Serbia's parliamentary friendship group with China.

Serbia's electoral laws were changed in 2011, such that all mandates were awarded to candidates on successful lists in numerical order. Nikolić received the sixty-seventh position on the Radical Party's list in the 2012 parliamentary election. Weakened by the 2008 split, the party failed to cross the electoral threshold to win representation in the assembly; Nikolić's parliamentary term ended when the new assembly was convened. He appeared on the Radical Party's list again in the 2014 parliamentary election, in which the party also failed to cross the threshold.

=== Mayor of Arilje (2015) ===
Nikolić led the Radical Party list for Arilje in the 2012 local elections and was re-elected when the list won three out of thirty-four seats. The Progressives initially formed a coalition government with Zoran Todorović as mayor, and the Radicals served in opposition.

In June 2015, a new and somewhat unusual governing coalition was established in Arilje by the Radicals, Dveri, and the Movement of Workers and Peasants (Pokret radnika i seljaka, PRS), with outside support from the Democratic Party (Demokratska stranka, DS) and the Liberal Democratic Party (Liberalno demokratska partija, LDP). Although the Radicals were only a small presence in the assembly by this time, Nikolić was chosen as the municipality's mayor. The governing coalition proved to be unstable, and in December 2015 the Progressive alliance return to power with Todorović once again in the mayor's office.

Nikolić again led the SRS list for Arilje in the 2016 local elections and was re-elected even as the list fell to two mandates. He also appeared in the 190th position on the SRS list in the concurrent 2016 parliamentary election; election from this position was an extremely remote prospect, and he was not elected when the list won twenty-two seats.

Nikolić was not a candidate in 2020, and his term in the local assembly ended that year.

== Electoral record ==
=== Local (Arilje) ===
2004 Municipality of Arilje local election: Mayor of Arilje
Candidate	Party	First round		Second round	
Candidate	Party	Votes	%	Votes	%
Zoran Mićović (incumbent)	Democratic Party–Boris Tadić	3,381		2,891	54.34
Radojko Mladenović	Democratic Party of Serbia–Vojislav Koštunica	1,125		2,429	45.66
Milan Nikolić	Serbian Radical Party–Tomislav Nikolić				
other candidates					
Total				5,320	100.00
