= National Network (Serbia) =

Political organization in Serbia

National Network Народна мрежа
- Abbreviation: NM
- Leader: Vladan Glišić
- Founder: Vladan Glišić
- Founded: 3 November 2015
- Split from: Dveri
- Ideology: Serbian nationalism Social conservatism Hard Euroscepticism
- Political position: Right-wing to far-right
- National affiliation: SPAS (2018–2020); NM–SSZ (since 2021)
- Colours: Red; Blue; Light blue White
- National Assembly: 0 / 250

Website
- narodnamreza.com

The National Network (Serbian: Народна мрежа, romanized: Narodna mreža; NM) is a political organization created by Vladan Glišić after leaving the Dveri movement. In 2018–2020, the organization was affiliated with the Serbian Patriotic Alliance.

The movement took part in the 2016 parliamentary election as part of the National Alliance coalition, but gained only 0.46% of the vote and did not enter to parliament.

The movement opposes the government of Aleksandar Vucic, and calls for the creation of a united pre-election opposition front.

At the end of 2020, the movement planned to take part in the creation of a broad right-wing coalition of the Serbian opposition, along with the POKS, DSS and SSZ, however, the idea of a coalition is thrown out and the DSS has formed its own coalition with the POKS, called National Democratic Alternative.

National Network signed a cooperation agreement with the far-right Serbian Party Oathkeepers in February 2021.
