= Sandra Ristić =

Serbian politician

Sandra Ristić (Serbian Cyrillic: Сандра Ристић; born 23 February 1978) is a politician in Serbia. She has served in the Assembly of Vojvodina since 2016 as a member of the League of Social Democrats of Vojvodina (LSV).

== Early life and private career ==
Ristić was born in Bela Crkva, Vojvodina, in what was then the Socialist Republic of Serbia in the Socialist Federal Republic of Yugoslavia. She was raised in the community and subsequently graduated with a bachelor's degree in Economics from the Beogradska Poslovna Škola (Belgrade Business School). She worked for Stamenkovićfrom 2001 to 2007 and was subsequently employed by Elektrovojvodina. In 2016, she charged that she was dismissed from a position at Elektrodistribucije Pančevo for refusing to support the Serbian Progressive Party. The company disputed this charge.

== Political career ==
Ristić joined the LSV in 2006 and was elected to the Bela Crkva municipal assembly under its banner in the municipal elections of 2008, 2012, and 2016. She served as president (i.e., speaker) of the municipal assembly from 2008 to 2009. In January 2016, she and other members of the LSV and the Democratic Party threatened to go on a hunger strike if the Serbian government did not address charges that local authorities had been removed illegally. She continues to serve on the municipal assembly as of 2019.

Ristić was elected as president of the LSV municipal committee for Bela Crkva in 2010. In October 2018, she was elected to the party's presidency.

She sought election to the National Assembly of Serbia in the elections of 2012, 2014, and 2016, in each case receiving an electoral list position that was too low for election to be a realistic prospect. She was not elected on any of these occasions.

=== Member of the Assembly of Vojvodina ===
Ristić first ran for the Assembly of Vojvodina in the 2012 Vojvodina provincial election, finishing second in the constituency seat of Bela Crkva. Vojvodina subsequently adopted a system of full proportional representation; Ristić received the ninth position on the LSV's list in the 2016 provincial election and was elected when the list won nine mandates. The Serbian Progressive Party and its allies won a majority government in this election, and the LSV sits in opposition. Ristić serves on the assembly committee on organization of administration and local self-government and the committee on establishing equal authenticity of provincial legislation in languages in official use.

== Electoral record ==
=== Provincial (Vojvodina) ===
2012 Vojvodina assembly election Bela Crkva (constituency seat) - First and Second Rounds
Željko Crnogorac	Choice for a Better Vojvodina	1,886	19.72	3,948	53.96
Sandra Ristić	League of Social Democrats of Vojvodina	1,093	11.43	3,369	46.04
Fadilja Hot	Let's Get Vojvodina Moving	1,039	10.86		
Sava Stefanov	Citizens' Group: Uniquely for Bela Crkva	946	9.89		
Darko Ostojić	Coalition: For a Better Future: Democratic Party of Serbia and Economic Council of the Municipality of Bela Crkva	842	8.80		
Ivana Ristić Hubert	Socialist Party of Serbia–Party of United Pensioners of Serbia–United Serbia–Social Democratic Party of Serbia	834	8.72		
Dragomir Đurišić	Rich Serbia – Movement of Agronomists and Entrepreneurs	832	8.70		
Miloš Vukoje	Communist Party	705	7.37		
Andriano Juga	Citizens' Group: United Regions of Serbia–Boris Đurđev	585	6.12		
Ilija Popović – Ćota	Movement of Workers and Peasants	455	4.76		
Radmila Rajka Simović	Serbian Radical Party	347	3.63		
Total valid votes		9,564	100	7,317	100
