= Zoran Dragišić =

Serbian politician and professor

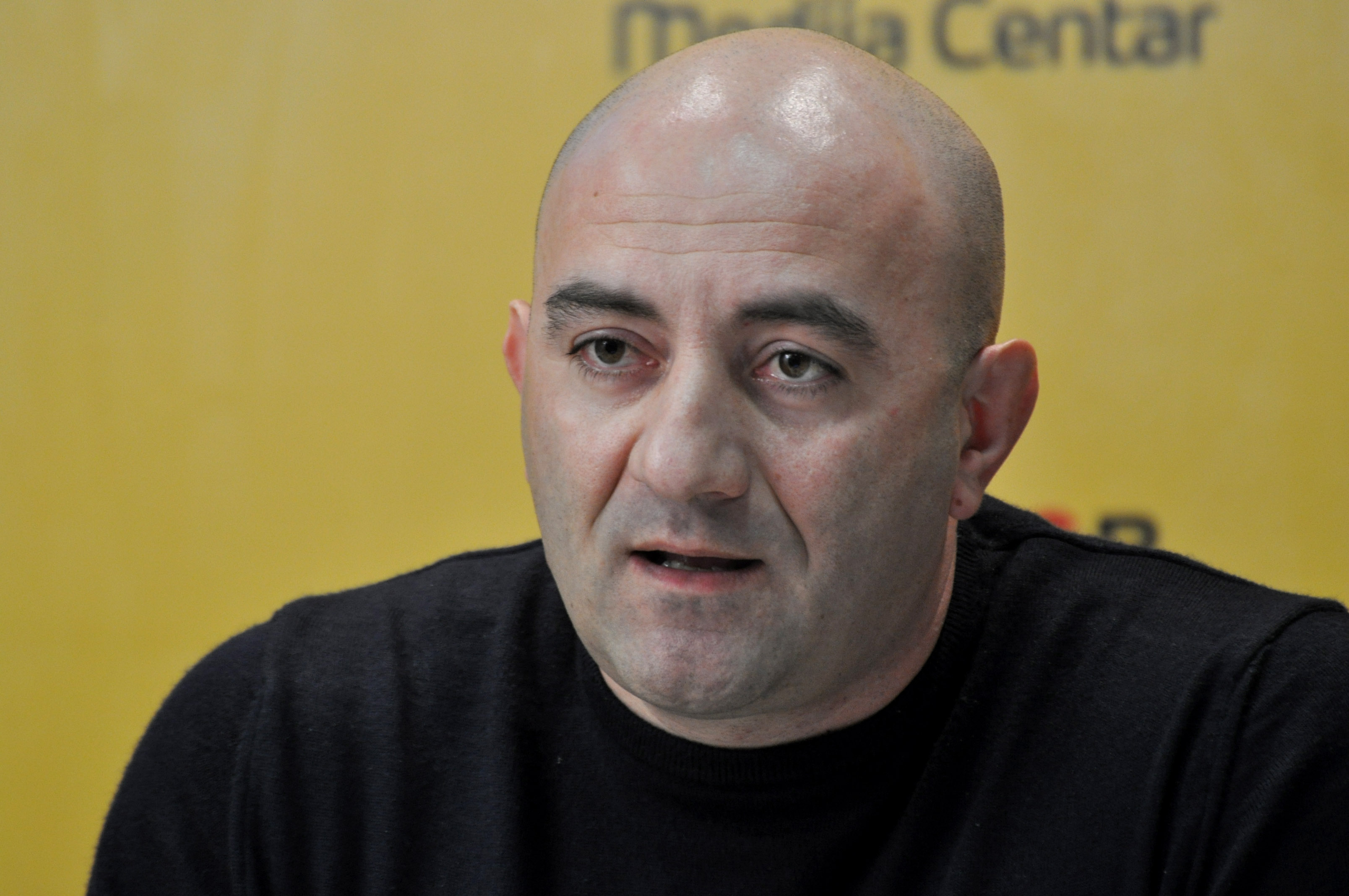
Dragišić in 2011

Zoran Dragišić (Serbian Cyrillic: Зоран Драгишић; born 21 January 1967) is a Serbian politician and professor at Faculty of Security Studies in Belgrade. He has served in the National Assembly of Serbia since 2016 as part of the parliamentary grouping of the Serbian Progressive Party (Srpska napredna stranka; SNS), although he is not a member of the party. He was previously a candidate for president of Serbia in the 2012 presidential election.

== Early life and private career ==
Dragišić was born in Belgrade, in what was then the Socialist Republic of Serbia in the Socialist Federal Republic of Yugoslavia, and grew up in the Karaburma neighbourhood. He graduated from the University of Belgrade Faculty of Security Studies in 1991 as valedictorian and subsequently earned a master's degree (1999) and Ph.D. (2004) from the university's law faculty. He has worked in the department of security studies since 1994, been an associate professor of security management since 2010, and published extensively in the field. Dragišić's views on defence and national security issues are frequently cited in the Serbian media.

In the early 2000s, Dragišić regularly promoted Serbia's cooperation with and eventual membership in the North Atlantic Treaty Organization (NATO). He remarked in 2005 that better relations with NATO would improve the position of Kosovo Serbs and help the process of Serbia's integration with the European Union. He also criticized Russian efforts to interfere with Serbia's foreign policy in relation to NATO, saying that Serbia was a sovereign nation and would ultimately make its own decisions.

In 2007, Dragišić said that Serbia would be ready to join NATO within three years. By 2009, however, he indicated that NATO's decision to accept Albania as a member introduced the prospect of Serbia's bid for membership being vetoed. He further argues that this changed situation was detrimental to Serbia's territorial integrity; he remarked that if Serbia had joined the Partnership for Peace program earlier and become a NATO member prior to Albania, then Kosovo "would be part of Serbia and [its] independence would not be an issue." By 2016, he accepted that NATO membership was no longer a realistic option, saying, "Serbia [has] clearly stated that it will not join NATO. And nobody has asked us to do it so far. In my opinion, we missed our chance in 2009, when Croatia and Albania joined the alliance."

There were rumours in December 2005 that Dragišić would be appointed as inspector-general of the State Union of Serbia and Montenegro's intelligence-security services. This ultimately did not happen, and the state union ceased to exist the following year when Montenegro declared its independence.

Dragišić supported Serbia's decision to commemorate the seventieth anniversary of the Liberation of Belgrade with a military parade in 2014, noting that it highlighted the military's anti-fascist tradition and demonstrated to the world that Serbia was a credible country with a serious army.

Dragišić has said that his favourite book is Ivo Andrić's Bosnian Chronicle.

== Politician ==
=== Before 2016 ===
Dragišić was a founding member of Vuk Obradović's Social Democracy (Socijaldemokratija; SD) party. This party eventually became divided and factionalized, and in January 2008 Dragišić established a breakaway group called the Independent Social Democrats (Nezavisni Socijaldemokrata, NSD). He stated that the latter party's goal was to unify Serbia's left-wing forces for the upcoming 2008 national elections, that it was "on the verge" of signing a coalition agreement with the Socialist Party of Serbia, and that the left should rally around Democratic Party incumbent Boris Tadić in the 2008 presidential election. He added that most NSD members (including himself) had been opponents of Slobodan Milošević's government in the 1990s but that it no longer made sense for Serbian politics to be divided between former supporters and former opponents of the Milošević regime.

In August 2009, Dragišić merged the NSD into the newly formed Social Democratic Party of Serbia (Socijaldemokratska partija Srbije; SDPS) led by Rasim Ljajić. This proved to be a short-lived alliance; Dragišić became disappointed with the SDPS's direction, left the party, and in October 2011 was chosen as leader of a new group called the Movement of Workers and Peasants (Pokret radnika i seljaka; PRS). At this party's founding conference, he indicated that its purpose would be to "give the state back to the people" and noted that it was supported by worker organizations such as Serbia's Union of Raspberry Producers, the Farmers' Association, and the Pig Breeders of Srem and Mačva.

Dragišić ran under the PRS's banner in the 2012 Serbian presidential election. During this campaign, he pledged to use "all the state power, including the military, to break the backbone of organized crime, corruption and monopoly system in Serbia." He received 60,116 votes (1.54%) in the first round of balloting, finishing tenth. He also led the PRS's electoral list in the concurrent 2012 Serbian parliamentary election; the party received 57,199 votes (1.46%) and did not cross the electoral threshold to enter parliament.

The PRS encouraged its supporters to vote for the Progressive Party's list in the 2014 Serbian parliamentary election. Dragišic remarked that Progressive Party leader and prime minister Aleksandar Vučić deserved to be returned to office for his work in fighting corruption and organized crime.

=== Parliamentarian ===
Dragišić received the twenty-eighth position on the Progressive Party's Aleksandar Vučić – Serbia Is Winning list in the 2016 Serbian parliamentary election and was elected when the list won a majority victory with 131 out of 250 mandates. During the 2016–20 parliament, he was a member of the assembly defence and internal affairs committee; a deputy member of the foreign affairs committee, the security services control committee, and the committee on education, science, technological development and the information society; a deputy member of Serbia's delegation to the NATO Parliamentary Assembly; the head of the parliamentary friendship group with Turkey; and a member of the parliamentary friendship groups with China, Israel, Liechtenstein, North Korea, Syria, Tunisia, the United Kingdom, and the United States of America.

He received the thirty-third position on the Progressive Party's list in the 2020 Serbian parliamentary election and was elected to a second term when the list won a landslide majority with 188 mandates. He remains a member of the defence committee and a deputy member of the foreign affairs and security services committees, now serves as a full member of Serbia's delegation to the NATO Parliamentary Assembly, and is a member of the friendship groups with the China, Croatia, Israel Netherlands, Qatar, Turkey, the United Kingdom, and the United States of America.
