= Ratko Dmitrović =

Serbian journalist and politician

- Ратко Дмитровић
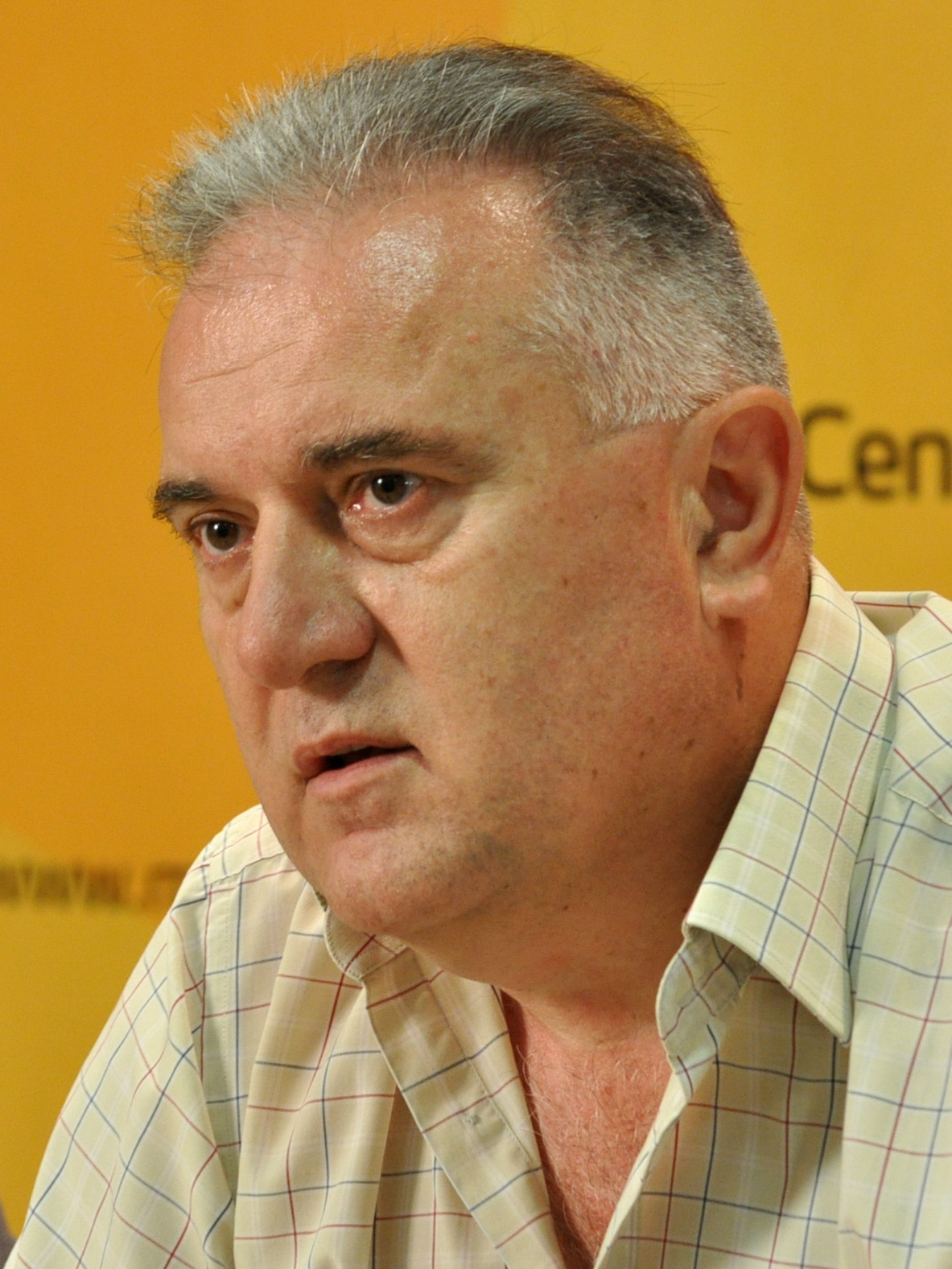
- Dmitrović in 2013

Minister of Families and Demographics
- In office 28 October 2020 – 26 October 2022
- Prime Minister: Ana Brnabić
- Preceded by: Position established
- Succeeded by: Darija Kisić

Personal details
- Born: Radomir Dmitrović; 1958 (age 67–68) Komogovina, SR Croatia, SFR Yugoslavia
- Party: Independent
- Children: 2
- Education: University of Belgrade; University of Zagreb
- Occupation: Journalist; politician

Radomir Dmitrović (Serbian Cyrillic: Радомир Дмитровић; born 1958) is a Serbian conservative journalist, publicist and politician who served as minister of families and demographics from 2020 to 2022.

== Biography ==
=== Early life and career ===
Dmitrović was born in 1958 in Komogovina, SR Croatia, SFR Yugoslavia. He finished high school in Kostajnica. He studied law, journalism and art history in Belgrade and Zagreb. He began his professional career as a journalist in 1981. He worked for a regional paper whose headquarters were in Sisak. He soon became a correspondent for Politika for Croatia, and then in the second half of the eighties he moved to Zagreb, from where he reported. While working in Politika, he was also a journalist for NIN. He came to Belgrade in August 1991 and started working for the Radio Television of Serbia (RTS). He worked for RTS until December 1993, when he left to start his own newspaper.

At the beginning of 1994, he started the weekly paper called Argument, of which he was the editor-in-chief, and which was published until 1999. After the Overthrow of Slobodan Milošević, he became an advisor to the Deputy Prime Minister of Serbia Nebojsa Čović. He worked as the editor-in-chief of the Frankfurt "News" for five years. Since 2008, he has been a regular columnist for the newspaper Pečat on the topic of Serbo-Croatian relations. He was the general director and editor-in-chief of the company "Novosti" from. He was appointed acting director unanimously by the supervisory board of Novosti on May 16, 2013.

He was officially appointed head of Novosti after a vote in the company held in 2013 and stayed in that position until 2017.

=== Political career ===
In the parliamentary elections in 2020, he was elected a member of parliament in the National Assembly of the Republic of Serbia, on the electoral list of the Serbian Patriotic Alliance. He appeared on the list as a non-partisan candidate.

== Personal life ==
He lives in Belgrade with his wife Nataša and daughters Olja and Lenka.

On 31 March 2021, Dmitrović announced that he tested positive for COVID-19, adding that he had a fever and that he was not feeling well.

== Books ==
- Professor Mišković's notebook, 2005.
- Cross on the Cross, 2016
