= Danica Grujičić =

Serbian health minister since 2022

- Даница Грујичић
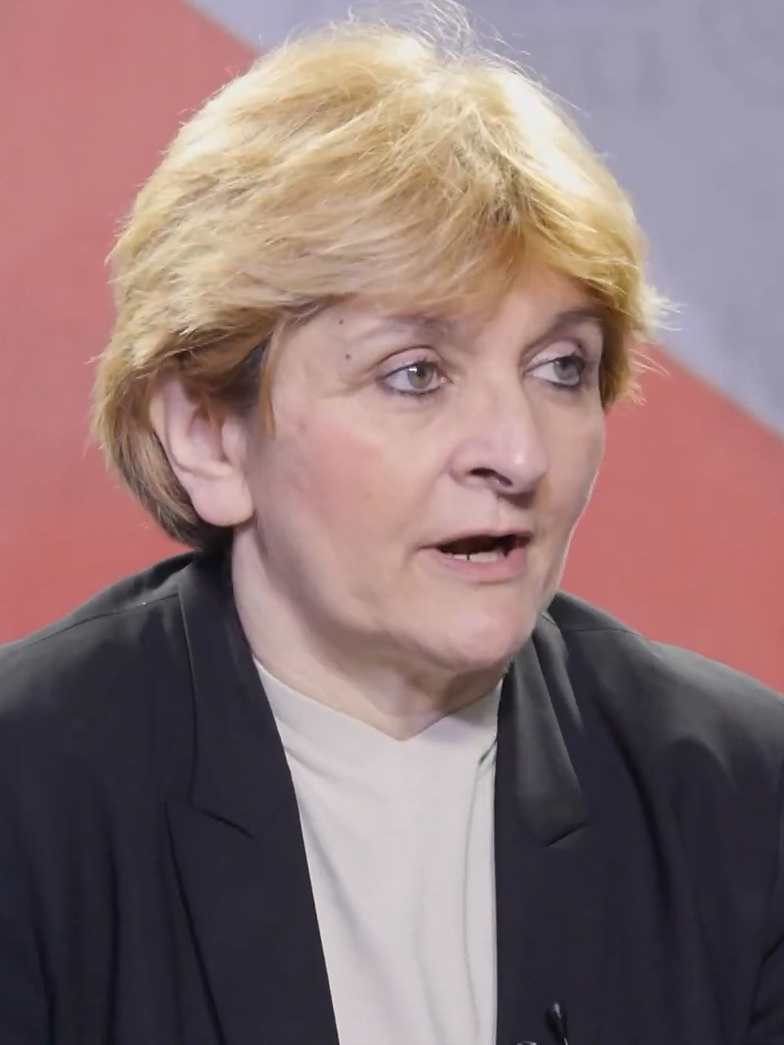
- Grujičić in 2019

Minister of Health
- In office 26 October 2022 – 2 May 2024
- Prime Minister: Ana Brnabić
- Preceded by: Zlatibor Lončar
- Succeeded by: Zlatibor Lončar

Personal details
- Born: 30 August 1959 (age 67) Titovo Užice, PR Serbia, FPR Yugoslavia
- Party: DS (2004–2011); SDS (2011–unknown)
- Education: University of Belgrade
- Occupation: Neurosurgeon specialist; politician
- Profession: Neurosurgeon

Danica Grujičić (Serbian Cyrillic: Даница Грујичић; born 30 August 1959) is a Serbian doctor, neurosurgeon specialist, and politician who served as minister of health from 2022 until 2024.

A member of the Democratic Party (DS) from 2004 to 2011, she left DS in 2011 and was elected vice president of the Social Democratic Alliance (SDS). Grujičić participated in the 2012 Serbian presidential election, finishing last with 0.78% of the votes. In February 2022, she became affiliated with the Serbian Progressive Party (SNS) and it was announced that she would be the ballot carrier of the SNS-led coalition's Together We Can Do Everything ballot list in the 2022 parliamentary election. She is the current head of the Center for Neuro-oncology of the Neurosurgical Clinic of the Clinical Centre of Serbia and a professor at the Faculty of Medicine in Belgrade.
