= Vladan Glišić =

Serbian politician and lawyer

- Владан Глишић
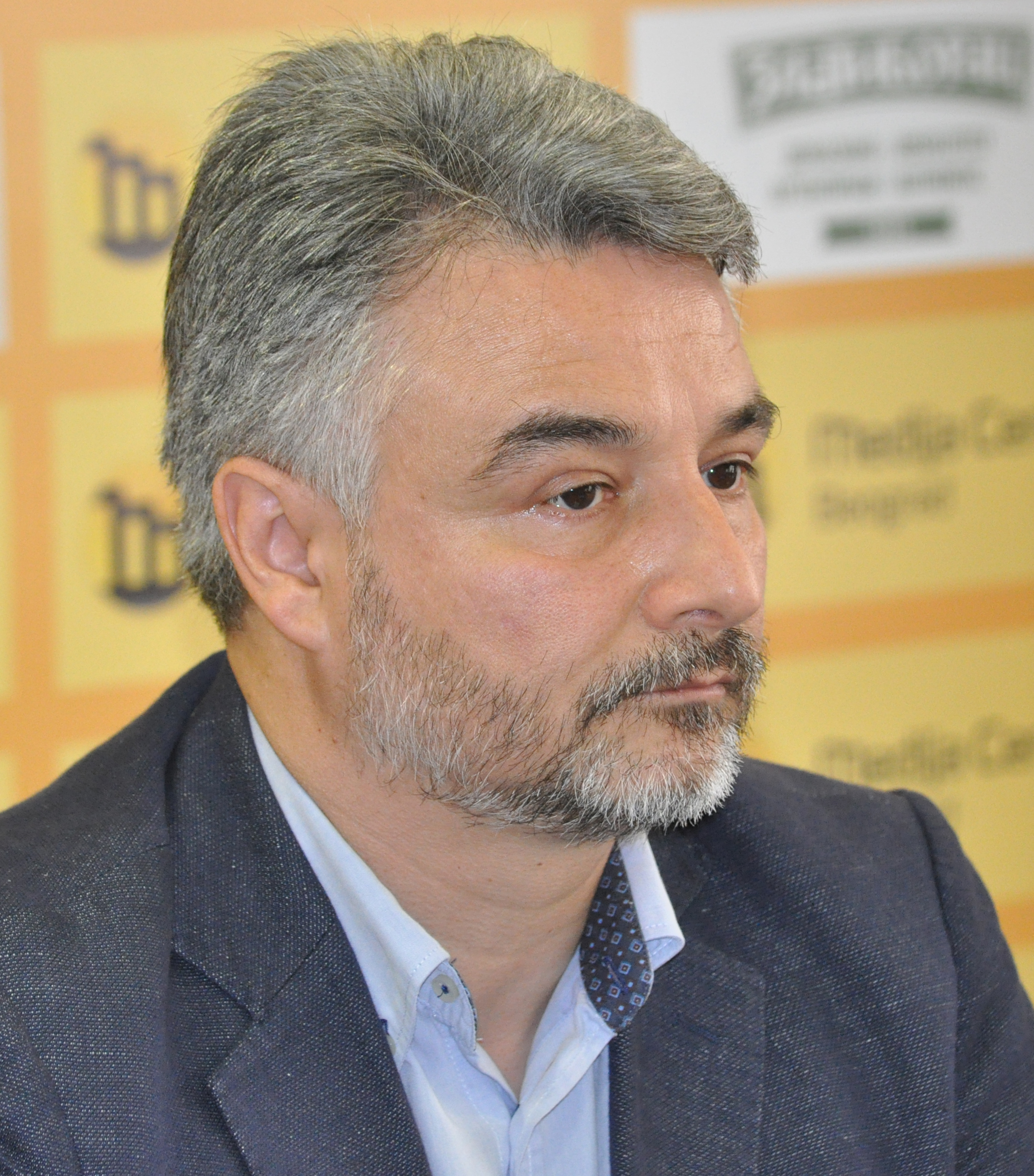
- Vladan Glišić in 2017

Member of the National Assembly
- In office 3 August 2020 – 1 August 2022

Personal details
- Born: 26 August 1970 (age 56) Priština, SR Serbia, Yugoslavia
- Party: Dveri (2001–2015); SPAS (2018–2020)
- Other political affiliations: National Network (2015–present)
- Education: University of Belgrade

Vladan Glišić (Serbian Cyrillic: Владан Глишић, August 26, 1970) is a Serbian politician and lawyer who was a member of the presidency of the Serbian Patriotic Alliance from 2018 to 2020. He is a former leader of Dveri and an independent candidate at the 2012 Serbian presidential elections. He is a former member of the National Assembly.

== Early life ==
He was born in Priština in 1970. He finished middle and high school in Aranđelovac, and the Faculty of Law, University of Belgrade. At the age of 17, he became one of the last political convicts in the Socialist Federal Republic of Yugoslavia, when he was imprisoned for founding and operating a secret youth anti-communist organization of Serbian nationalists.

== Political career ==
He has been actively involved in politics since he was seventeen, and in 2001 he joined the Dveri movement. In 2003, he became a member of the Elders of this movement. He was a member of the Eldership of Dveri until June 2015, when this body of the Dveri movement was abolished. He ran for president at the 2012 Serbian presidential elections and won 2.77% of the vote.

After the founding assembly of the Serbian movement Dveri as a political party, held on 27 June 2015, at which the Eldership was abolished and the Transitional Council was elected and Boško Obradović was elected president of this movement (until then this function did not exist in the Dveri movement). Vladan Glišić opposed such a transformation of the movement. He was not elected to any position in the movement after the Eldership was abolished. After that, Glišić withdrew from the activities in this movement and continued to criticize in the media the reforms within the movement initiated by Boško Obradović. He formally remained a member of the Dveri movement. On 15 August 2015, Dveri announced that Vladan Glišić has not spoken on behalf of this movement since the founding assembly of Dveri held on 27 June 2015, and that he can only speak on his own behalf.

He was a legal advisor at the Ministry of Finance of Serbia, as well as the Deputy Public Attorney in the municipality of Rakovica.

After leaving Dveri, he founded a political organization called National Network which participated in the 2016 Serbian Parliamentary election. However, the organization finished last, with only 0.46% of the popular vote.

Since July 2018, he has been a member of the presidency of the newly established political party called the Serbian Patriotic Alliance (SPAS), which is headed by Aleksandar Šapić. He received a fifth position at the electoral list of the Serbian Patriotic Alliance for the 2020 Serbian Parliamentary elections.

After the 2020 Serbian Parliamentary elections in which the Serbian Patriotic Alliance finished third, Glisić said that his party is willing to participate in the government if the Serbian Progressive Party offers them a coalition.

On 22 July 2020, Aleksandar Šapić announced that he removed Glišić from the SPAS parliamentary group and that he will also be removed from the party because he broke the party rules.

In late March 2021, Glišić stated his opposition to legalization of civil unions including the "LGBT ideology".
