= Darija Kisić =

Serbian epidemiologist

- Дарија Кисић
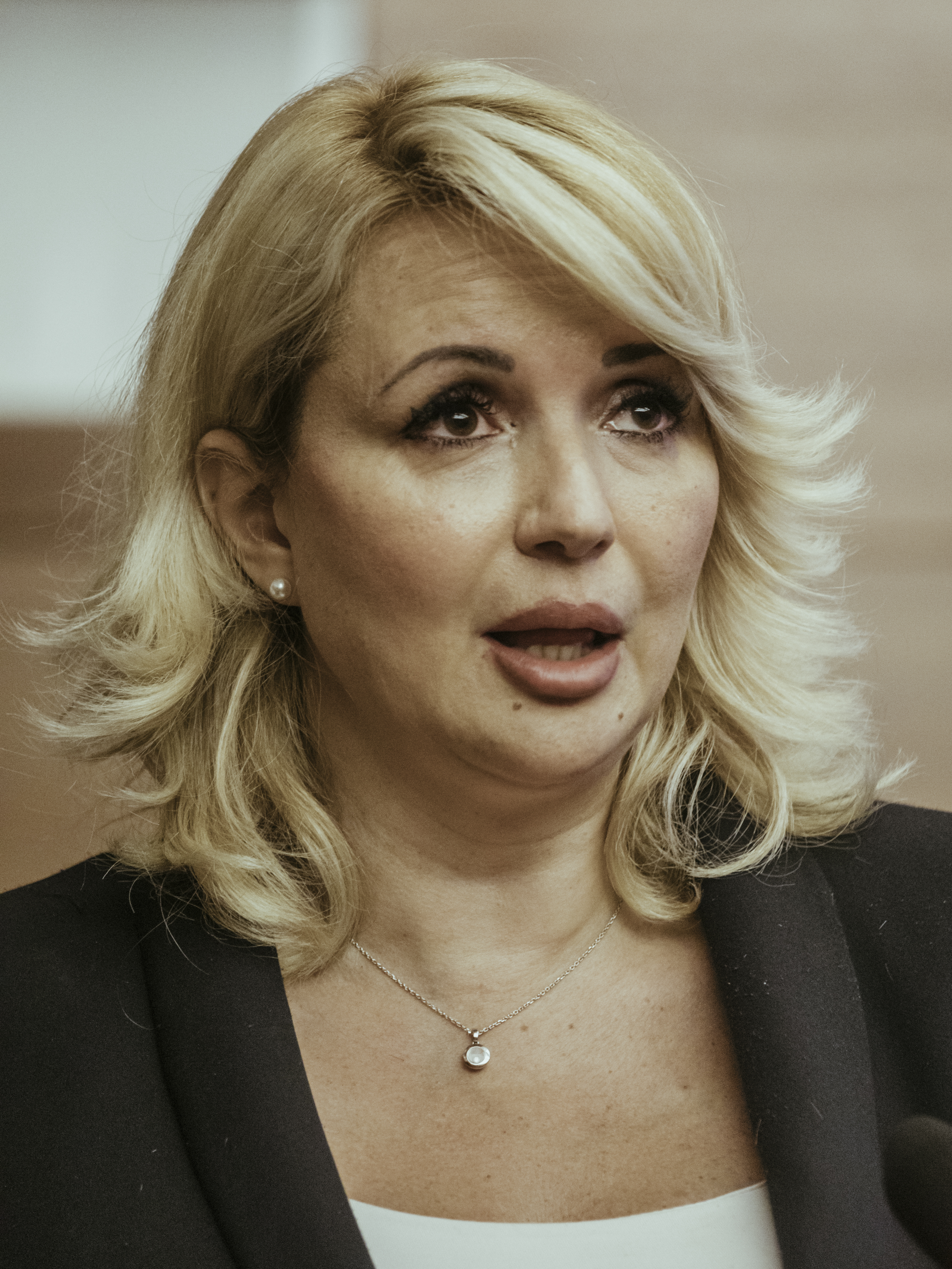
- Kisić in 2021

Minister of Family Welfare and Demography
- In office 26 October 2022 – 2 May 2024
- Prime Minister: Ana Brnabić
- Preceded by: Ratko Dmitrović
- Succeeded by: Milica Đurđević Stamenkovski

Minister of Labour, Employment, Veteran and Social Policy
- In office 28 October 2020 – 26 October 2022
- Prime Minister: Ana Brnabić
- Preceded by: Zoran Đorđević
- Succeeded by: Nikola Selaković

Personal details
- Born: 20 August 1975 (age 51) Sarajevo, SR Bosnia and Herzegovina, SFR Yugoslavia
- Party: SNS (2021–present)
- Education: University of Belgrade
- Profession: Epidemiologist

Darija Kisić (Serbian Cyrillic: Дарија Кисић; formerly Darija Kisić Tepavčević, Serbian Cyrillic: Дарија Кисић Тепавчевић; born 20 August 1975) is a Serbian doctor, epidemiologist and politician who served as minister of family welfare and demography from 2022 to 2024. A member of the Serbian Progressive Party (SNS), she previously served as minister of labour, employment, veteran and social policy from 2020 to 2022.

She is also a professor at the department of epidemiology, Faculty of Medicine, University of Belgrade and a former assistant director for Public Health and Population Policy of the Institute of Public Health of Serbia "Milan Jovanović Batut".

== Biography ==
Kisić Tepavčević was born in 1975 in Sarajevo which at the time was a part of the Socialist Federal Republic of Yugoslavia. Later, she moved to Belgrade and she graduated from the Faculty of Medicine in Belgrade in 2001. She received her master's degree in epidemiology from the same faculty in 2006, and her doctorate on the topic: "Predictive value of quality of life in assessing the outcome of the disease in patients with multiple sclerosis".

In February 2002, she was elected a teaching associate at the Department of Epidemiology at the Faculty of Medicine. She was elected assistant professor in May 2007, and again in June 2010. At the end of that year, she was nominated for the title of assistant professor, and since 2017 she has been an associate professor at the Medical Faculty in Belgrade.

During her career, she has published more than 120 scientific papers in international scientific journals.

She played one of the leading roles in the fight against chickenpox epidemics in 2017/18 and the COVID-19 pandemic in Serbia in 2020.

Since 28 October 2020, she is serving as the Minister of Labour, Employment, Veteran and Social Policy in the Government of Serbia and the Second cabinet of Ana Brnabić.

Her brother Bojan is married to the former Minister of Justice Nela Kuburović.

On 25 November 2021, she joined the Serbian Progressive Party.
