= Zoran Đorđević (politician) =

Serbian politician (born 1970)

- Зоран Ђорђевић
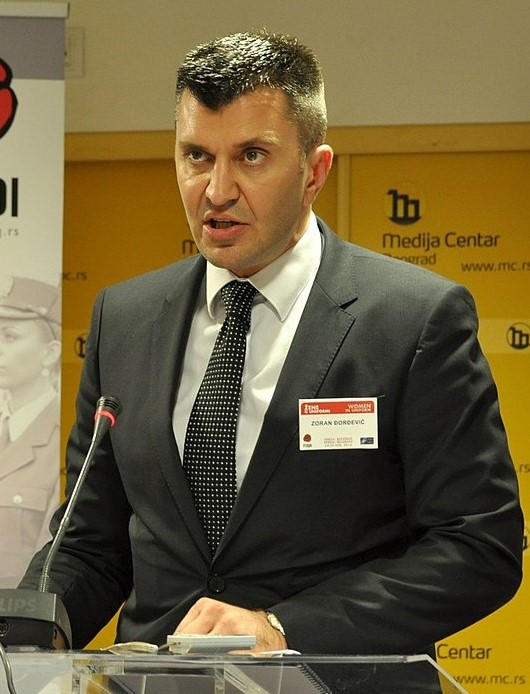
- Đorđević in June 2014

Acting Director of Pošta Srbije
- In office 4 March 2021 – 16 March 2024
- Preceded by: Mira Petrović
- Succeeded by: Zoran Anđelković

Minister of Labour, Employment, Veteran and Social Policy
- In office 29 June 2017 – 28 October 2020
- Prime Minister: Ana Brnabić
- Preceded by: Aleksandar Vulin
- Succeeded by: Darija Kisić Tepavčević

Minister of Defence
- In office 2 March 2016 – 29 June 2017
- Prime Minister: Aleksandar Vučić; Ivica Dačić (Acting)
- Preceded by: Dušan Vujović (Acting)
- Succeeded by: Aleksandar Vulin

Personal details
- Born: 11 February 1970 (age 56) Belgrade, SFR Yugoslavia
- Party: Serbian Progressive Party
- Children: 2
- Education: School of National Defense; Megatrend University; Panteion University
- Occupation: Politician

Zoran Đorđević (Serbian: Зоран Ђорђевић, born 11 February 1970) is a Serbian politician. He served as the Minister of Defence of Serbia in the Government of Serbia from 2016 to 2017, and the Minister of Labour, Employment, Veteran and Social Policy from 2017 to 2020.

== Education and career ==
Đorđević graduated from the School of National Defense in Belgrade. He later acquired a joint-master's degree in international banking and finance from the John Naisbitt University Faculty of International Economics and the Panteion University. Đorđević completed his doctoral studies in the field of economic sciences at the University Business Academy in Novi Sad. He gained professional experience in leading positions in financial and executive management with domestic and regional companies, including Comtrade, Kabel-X, and others.

== Political career ==
In 2012, Đorđević served as the Deputy Minister of Defence of Serbia. He also serves as the president of the Political Council for Gender Equality of the Government of the Republic of Serbia and National Director of Arms. On 2 March 2016, Đorđević was appointed Minister of Defence of Serbia.

In February 2017, the Prime Minister of Serbia Aleksandar Vučić decided to run for the 2017 Serbian presidential elections. Vučić won the elections in the first round and was sworn as the President of Serbia on 31 May 2017. Weeks later, Đorđević gave mandate to Ana Brnabić to form the governmental cabinet. On 29 June 2017, the cabinet of Ana Brnabić was formed, with Đorđević swapping minister positions with Aleksandar Vulin to become the Minister of Labour, Employment, Veteran and Social Policy. His term ended on 28 October 2020 upon the appointment of Darija Kisić Tepavčević as minister.

Since 4 March 2021, Đorđević has been serving as director of the national postal service, Pošta Srbije. However, he was dismissed from the position on 16 May 2024.

== Personal life ==
Đorđević is married and has two children. Apart from his native Serbian, he can speak English and Russian. Outside politics, Đorđević is also a member of Mensa Serbia.

Political offices
Preceded by Dušan Vujović (Acting)	Minister of Defence of Serbia; 2016–2017	Succeeded by Aleksandar Vulin
Preceded by Aleksandar Vulin	Minister of Labour, Employment, Veteran and Social Policy of Serbia; 2017–2020	Succeeded by Darija Kisić Tepavčević
