= Jelena Žarić Kovačević =

Serbian politician (born 1981)

- Јелена Жарић Ковачевић
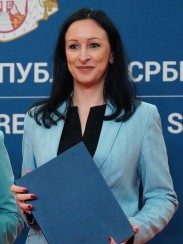
- Žarić Kovačević in 2024

Minister of Family Welfare and Demography
- Incumbent
- Assumed office 16 April 2025
- Prime Minister: Đuro Macut
- Preceded by: Milica Đurđević Stamenkovski

Minister of Public Administration and Local Self-Government
- In office 2 May 2024 – 16 April 2025
- Prime Minister: Miloš Vučević
- Preceded by: Aleksandar Martinović
- Succeeded by: Snežana Paunović

Member of the National Assembly of Serbia
- In office 3 June 2016 – 1 May 2024
- President: Maja Gojković; Ivica Dačić; Vladimir Orlić; Ana Brnabić

Personal details
- Born: 2 May 1981 (age 44) Niš, SR Serbia, SFR Yugoslavia
- Party: SNS
- Occupation: Politician

Jelena Žarić Kovačević (Serbian Cyrillic: Јелена Жарић Ковачевић; born 2 May 1981) is a Serbian politician who has served as minister of family welfare and demography since 2025. She previously served as minister of public administration and local self-government from 2024 to 2025. She previously served as a member of the National Assembly of Serbia from 2016 to 2024 as a member of the Serbian Progressive Party.

== Early life and career ==
Žarić Kovačević was born in Niš on 2 May 1981, in what was then the Socialist Republic of Serbia in the Socialist Federal Republic of Yugoslavia. She was raised in the city and has both a bachelor's degree and a master's degree from the University of Niš Faculty of Law. She is a law professor and worked as a lawyer until 2012, when she became deputy secretary of the Niš city assembly. Furthermore, she served in this role until March 2016, when she became president of the city's election commission; she resigned from the latter position upon entering the national assembly in July of same year. The revenue that she and other election commissioners earned subsequently became a point of controversy, although she has said that the payments simply followed past precedent.

== Politician ==
Žarić Kovačević received the 219th position (out of 250) on the party's Aleksandar Vučić — Future We Believe In electoral list for the 2014 Serbian parliamentary election; this was too low a position for election to be a realistic possibility, and indeed she was not elected despite the list winning a landslide victory with 158 out of 250 mandates. She was promoted to the fifty-first position on the successor Aleksandar Vučić — Serbia is winning list for the 2016 parliamentary election and was elected when the list won 131 mandates.

During the 2016–20 parliament, she was a member of the assembly's committee on constitutional and legislative issues; a deputy member of the committee on human and minority rights and gender equality and the committee on spatial planning, transport, infrastructure, and telecommunications; a deputy member of Serbia's delegation to the Parliamentary Assembly of the Mediterranean; the head of Serbia's parliamentary friendship group with the United Arab Emirates (UAE); and a member of the parliamentary friendship groups with Austria, Azerbaijan, Belgium, Bosnia and Herzegovina, Bulgaria, Canada, China, Croatia, Cyprus, Finland, France, Germany, Greece, Guatemala, Hungary, Italy, Japan, Montenegro, the Netherlands, North Macedonia, Russia, Slovenia, Spain, Switzerland, the United Kingdom, and the United States of America. In June 2020, she was recognized as the most active parliamentarian from southeastern Serbia in the previous assembly.

She received the 144th position on the Progressive Party's Aleksandar Vučić — For Our Children list in the 2020 election and was elected to a second term when the list won a landslide majority with 188 mandates. She is now the chair of the committee on constitutional and legislative issues and a member of the committee on the judiciary, public administration, and local self-government, as well as continuing to lead Serbia's parliamentary friendship group with the UAE.
