= Milica Đurđević Stamenkovski =

Serbian politician (born 1990)

- Милица Ђурђевић Стаменковски
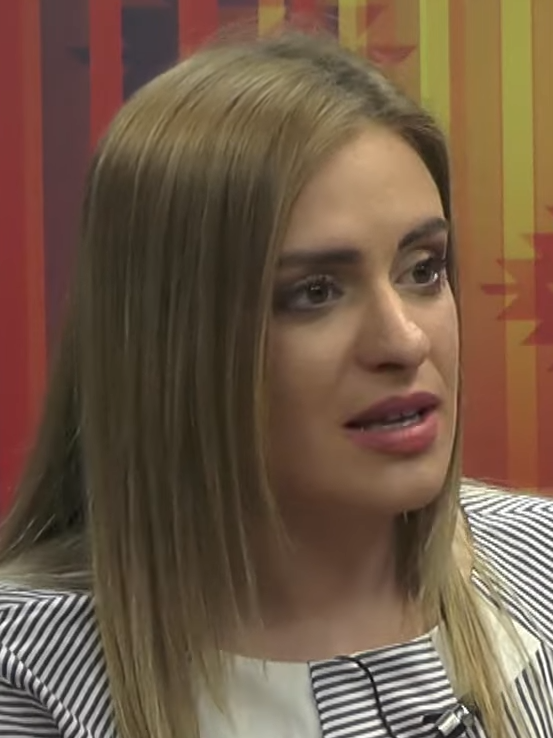
- Đurđević Stamenkovski in 2022

Minister of Labour, Employment, Veteran and Social Policy
- Incumbent
- Assumed office 16 April 2025
- Prime Minister: Đuro Macut
- Preceded by: Nemanja Starović

Minister of Family Welfare and Demography
- In office 2 May 2024 – 16 April 2025
- Prime Minister: Miloš Vučević
- Preceded by: Darija Kisić
- Succeeded by: Jelena Žarić Kovačević

Personal details
- Born: 21 July 1990 (age 36) Belgrade, SR Serbia, Yugoslavia
- Party: SRS (2009–2012); SSZ (2012–present)
- Spouse: Stefan Stamenkovski (m. 2017)
- Children: 2
- Education: University of Belgrade (dropped out)
- Occupation: Politician
- Nickname: Milica Zavetnica

Milica Đurđević Stamenkovski (Serbian Cyrillic: Милица Ђурђевић Стаменковски; born 21 July 1990) is a Serbian politician who has served as minister of labour, employment, veteran, and social policy since 2025. She was previously the minister of family welfare and demography from 2024 to 2025. She co-founded the far-right Serbian Party Oathkeepers in 2012 and is serving as its president.

== Early life and education ==
Đurđević was born on 21 July 1990 in Belgrade. Her father is Rajko Đurđević, a journalist, writer and publicist. She was a student at the University of Belgrade Faculty of Political Sciences from 2009, before transferring to the Russian Institute for Diaspora and Migrations in 2020.

== Political career ==
Đurđević distinguished herself as the leader of ultranationalist protests against the arrests of Radovan Karadžić and Ratko Mladić, the ICTY verdicts against Serbian war criminals, and the implementation of agreements on border crossings between Serbia and Kosovo, as well as the Brussels Agreement. She also participated in organising protests against the visit of former British Prime Minister Tony Blair and the ratification of the agreement between Serbia and NATO on cooperation in the field of logistical support.

Đurđević Stamenkovski participated in the rally in support of Syrian President Bashar al-Assad and at the rally in support of the Russian Federation on the occasion of the annexation of Crimea and the war in Donbas. She was the leader of the list of the Serbian Party Oathkeepers for the 2014 Serbian parliamentary elections in a coalition with Borislav Pelević; however, the list did not pass the required 5% threshold. On 10 September 2017, she married Stefan Stamenkovski, president and founder of the Serbian Party Oathkeepers.

=== Minister of Family Welfare and Demography ===
Đurđević Stamenkovski became a minister in SNS government in 2024, after elections held in 2023, even though they were nominally a self-proclaimed opposition to SNS and Aleksandar Vučić. The party Oathkeepers were accused before of being a fake opposition to SNS. She joined the government as Minister of Family Welfare and Demography in May 2024.

== Personal life ==
Đurđević Stamenkovski is married to Stefan Stamenkovski. She gave birth to two children in June 2023.
