= Vranići, Serbia =

Vranići Вранићи
- Location within Serbia
- Coordinates: 43.9358°N 20.3272°E
- Country: Serbia
- District: Moravica District
- Municipality: Čačak

Area
  - Total: 4.74 km^{2} (1.83 sq mi)
- Elevation: 243 m (797 ft)

Population (2011)
  - Total: 456
  - Density: 96.2/km^{2} (249/sq mi)
- Time zone: UTC+1 (CET)
  - Summer (DST): UTC+2 (CEST)

Vranići (Serbian Cyrillic: Вранићи) is a village in the municipality of Čačak, Serbia. According to the 2011 census, the village has a population of 456 people.
