= Liberation Movement (Serbia) =

Liberation Ослобођење
- Leader: Mlađan Đorđević
- Founder: Mlađan Đorđević
- Founded: 9 July 2020; 4 years ago
- Headquarters: Belgrade
- Ideology: National conservatism; Social conservatism; Russophilia
- Political position: Right-wing
- Religion: Serbian Orthodox Church
- National Assembly: 0 / 250
- Assembly of Vojvodina: 0 / 120
- City Assembly of Belgrade: 0 / 110

Website
- https://pokretoslobodjenje.rs

Liberation Movement (Serbian: Покрет ослобођење, romanized: Pokret oslobođenje) is a right-wing national conservative and russophilic political organization in Serbia. It was founded in 2020 by Mlađan Đorđević, a Serbian politician and businessman who served as an Advisor for Kosovo and Metohija to the 3rd President of Serbia, Boris Tadić as well as the Deputy Minister of the National Investment Plan from 2007 to 2008.

== History and forming ==
Since 2018, Đorđević has been active within the Alliance for Serbia, an opposition political alliance founded with the aim of overthrowing Aleksandar Vučić and the Serbian Progressive Party. The alliance eventually dissolved in September 2020, and Đorđević founded a new political movement called "Liberation". He has been going around Serbia and talking with former and active members of both the ruling and opposition parties, wanting to gather all those who are dissatisfied with the situation on both sides of the political spectrum.

On 14 October, Liberation held a first gathering in Orašac at the location of the beginning of the First Serbian Uprising. As he said, they gathered at the very place from when the liberation of Serbia began in 1804, because "every Serb has the spirit of Karađorđe and that spark should be released in difficult times like this." Đorđević said that they are against the agreement, the recognition of Kosovo or Kosovo's membership in the United Nations. He added that there is no quick solution for Kosovo and that the solution is written in the Constitution of Serbia and Resolution 1244. It was also announced that Liberation "will start a kind of series of talks with citizens throughout Serbia, in order to gather all freedom-loving people in a broad front that would oppose Vučić's crime and autocracy."

The logo of the organization is a bear and it is similar to the logo of the United Russia, the ruling political party in Russia.
