= Mlađan Đorđević =

Serbian politician and businessman

- Млађан Ђорђевић
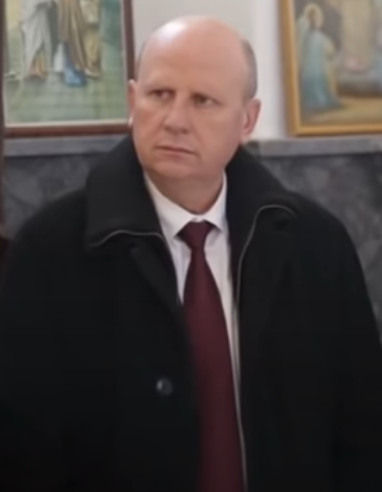

Deputy Minister without Portfolio in charge of the National Investment Plan
- In office 15 May 2007 – 7 July 2008
- Prime Minister: Vojislav Koštunica
- Minister: Dragan Đilas

Personal details
- Born: 1963 (age 62–63) Prizren, Serbia, Yugoslavia (now Kosovo)
- Party: Liberation Movement
- Education: University of Belgrade
- Occupation: Politician, businessman

Mlađan Đorđević (Serbian Cyrillic: Млађан Ђорђевић; born 1963) is a Serbian politician and businessman who served as an Advisor for Kosovo and Metohija to the 3rd President of Serbia, Boris Tadić as well as the Deputy Minister without Portfolio in charge of the National Investment Plan from 2007 to 2008. He has been described as a man with strong ties to Russia and the factions of the Serbian Orthodox Church.

== Biography ==
=== Early life ===
Đorđević was born in 1963 in Prizren which at the time was a part of the Socialist Federal Republic of Yugoslavia. He graduated from the Faculty of Political Sciences, University of Belgrade.

He was among the organizers of 1992 student demonstrations against Slobodan Milošević and he had an opportunity to meet with Milošević as well.

According to Dragan Đilas, who is a best man to Đorđević, he is his good friend. He was a co-founder of Direct Media in April 2001. Djordjevic was also one of the co-owners of "MD International", which Đilas founded in the Czech Republic in 1995.

=== Political career ===
He is one of the founders of the humanitarian organization "Our Serbia" which has implemented a program to help children of the killed, abducted and missing during the past wars in our area (i.e. children of killed members of the army and police and civilian victims of war). The organization has cooperated with the Russian Orthodox Church, the Russian Institute for Strategic Research and the Fund for Social and Cultural Initiatives, founded by Svetlana Medvedeva, the former first lady of Russia. Banca Intesa, Delta Bank and Grand Casino were among the donors of the organization.

He was the Deputy Director of the People's Office of the President of the Republic from 2004 to 2007, when Dragan Đilas was the director, and from 2007 to 2008 when Đilas was the Minister for the Investment Plan, Đorđević was his Deputy Minister. He also served as an Advisor for Kosovo and Metohija to the 3rd President of Serbia, Boris Tadić.

In May 2010, then-Montenegrin Prime Minister and leader of the Democratic Party of Socialists (DPS), Milo Đukanovic, described him as a man tasked with helping the opposition in Montenegro.

He was the Secretary of the Council for Serbs in the region and the diaspora in which the participators were President, Prime Minister, competent ministers and Bishop Grigorije (Durić).

Since 2018, he has been active within the Alliance for Serbia, an opposition political alliance founded with the aim of overthrowing Aleksandar Vučić and the Serbian Progressive Party. The alliance eventually dissolved in September 2020, and Đorđević founded a new political movement called Liberation. He has been going around Serbia and talking with former and active members of both the ruling and opposition parties, wanting to gather all those who are dissatisfied with the situation on both sides of the political spectrum.

On 14 October, Liberation held a first gathering in Orašac at the location of the beginning of the First Serbian Uprising. As he said, they gathered at the very place from when the liberation of Serbia began in 1804, because "every Serb has the spirit of Karađorđe and that spark should be released in difficult times like this." Đorđević said that they are against the agreement, the recognition of Kosovo or Kosovo's membership in the United Nations. He added that there is no quick solution for Kosovo and that the solution is written in the Constitution of Serbia and Resolution 1244. It was also announced that Liberation "will start a kind of series of talks with citizens throughout Serbia, in order to gather all freedom-loving people in a broad front that would oppose Vučić's crime and autocracy." This gathering was described as the start of the 2022 Serbian presidential election campaign.
