= Ministry of Family Welfare and Demography (Serbia) =

Government ministry of Serbia

- Министарство за бригу о породици и демографију Ministarstvo za brigu o porodici i demografiju

Ministry overview
- Formed: 26 October 2020; 5 years ago
- Jurisdiction: Government of Serbia
- Headquarters: Palace of Serbia, Bulevar Mihajla Pupina 2, Belgrade
- Minister responsible: Milica Đurđević Stamenkovski
- Website: minbpd.gov.rs

The Ministry of Family Welfare and Demography (Serbian Cyrillic: Министарство за бригу о породици и демографију, romanized: Ministarstvo za brigu o porodici i demografiju) is a ministry in the Government of Serbia, established by a vote of the National Assembly of Serbia on 26 October 2020. Before that, similar Ministry of Family Welfare has existed between 1998 and 2001.

At the time of the ministry's re-establishment in 2020, it was provisioned to be in charge of addressing issues relating to "family protection, marriage, population policy, family planning, the promotion and development of demographic policy, birth rate, and quality and life expectancy." Ratko Dmitrović was appointed as minister two days later when Ana Brnabić's second cabinet was constituted. After his appointment as minister, Dmitrović said that Serbia's low birth rate should be targeted by both material incentives and by what he described as promoting "the cult of the family in the most positive sense of the word." The ministry issued a statement in November 2021 that every fifth inhabitant of Serbia is over sixty-five and that every seventh is under fourteen.

== Organization ==
The ministry is organized into following departments:

- Department for planning and improvement of families and children, quality of life, extension of life, and family legal protection
- Department for demography, internal migration, and cooperation with local self-government
- Department for population policy, birth-rate policy, and reproductive health
- Department for international cooperation and European integration

== List of ministers ==
Political Party: SRS SPS SNS SSZ n-p

Name	Party	Term of office		Prime Minister (Cabinet)
Minister of Family Welfare
Rada Trajković (born 1953)	SPS	24 March 1998	24 October 2000 (Note: Resigned on 14 June 1999, but continued to perform her duties.)	Marjanović II
Slavica Đukić Dejanović (born 1951)	SPS	25 October 2000	25 January 2001	Minić
Minister of Family Welfare and Demography
Ratko Dmitrović (born 1958)	n-p (Note: Endorsed by the Serbian Patriotic Alliance until 28 May 2021 and by the Serbian Progressive Party from 28 May 2021.)	28 October 2020	26 October 2022	Brnabić (II)
Darija Kisić Tepavčević (born 1975)	SNS	26 October 2022	2 May 2024	Brnabić (III)
Milica Đurđević Stamenkovski (born 1990)	SSZ	2 May 2024	16 April 2025	Vučević (I)
Jelena Žarić Kovačević (born 1981)	SNS	16 April 2025	Incumbent	Macut (I)
