= Zoran Tomić (politician) =

Serbian politician (born 1988)

- Зоран Томић
- Born: 23 December 1988 (age 37); Kruševac, Yugoslavia
- Occupation: Politician

Zoran Tomić (Serbian Cyrillic: Зоран Томић; born 23 December 1988) is Serbian politician. He has served in the National Assembly of Serbia since 2020 as a member of the Serbian Progressive Party.

== Early life ==
Tomić lives in Kruševac and holds a master's degree from the University of Niš Faculty of Economics, where he is currently a doctoral student. He started the astronomical society Eureka in Kruševac in 2010 and has been a local co-ordinator for Mensa International.

== Political career ==
=== Municipal politics ===
Tomić first sought election to the Kruševac municipal assembly in the 2012 Serbian municipal elections, appearing in the tenth position on the electoral list of the Movement of Workers and Peasants. The list did not win any mandates. He subsequently joined the Progressive Party and became a member of its city board in Kruševac.

Tomić received the eighteenth position on the Progressive Party's coalition list in the 2016 municipal elections and was elected when the list won a landslide majority with 52 mandates. He did not seek re-election in 2020.

=== Parliamentarian ===
Tomić was given the 167th position on the Progressive Party's Aleksandar Vučić — For Our Children list in the 2020 parliamentary election and was elected when the list won a landslide majority with 188 out of 250 mandates. He is a member of the assembly committee on the economy, regional development, trade, tourism, and energy; a deputy member of the culture and information committee and the committee on finance, state budget, and control of public spending; the leader of Serbia's parliamentary friendship group with Fiji; and a member of the parliamentary friendship groups with Australia, Austria, Azerbaijan, Bosnia and Herzegovina, Brazil, Bulgaria, Canada, China, Cuba, Cyprus, the Czech Republic, France, Germany, Greece, Hungary, India, Iraq, Iran, Italy, Japan, Kazakhstan, Luxembourg, Montenegro, North Macedonia, Norway, Poland, Qatar, Romania, Russia, Slovakia, Slovenia, South Africa, Spain, Sweden, Switzerland, Tunisia, Turkey, Ukraine, United Arab Emirates, the UK, and the USA.

Tomić also became a member of Serbia's delegation to the Parliamentary Assembly of the Council of Europe (PACE) in January 2021. He is a member of the committee on social affairs, health, and sustainable development and the committee on culture, science, education, and media.
