= Boško Obradović =

Serbian politician

- Бошко Обрадовић
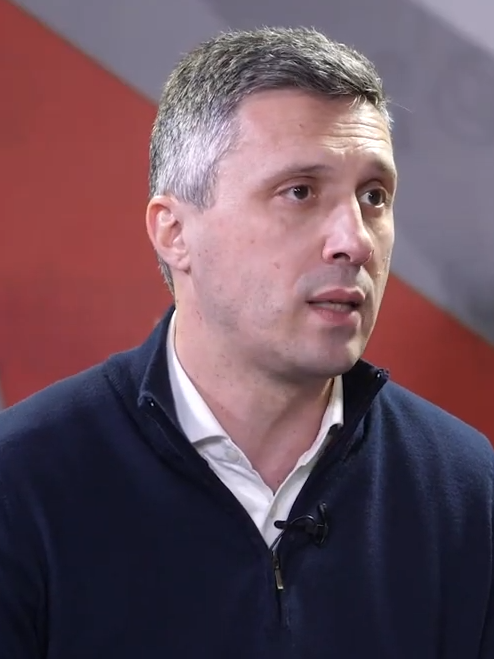
- Obradović in 2021

Member of the National Assembly
- In office 1 August 2022 – 6 February 2024
- In office 3 June 2016 – 3 June 2020

Personal details
- Born: 23 August 1976 (age 50) Vranići, Čačak, SFR Yugoslavia
- Party: Dveri
- Spouse(s): Vesna Obradović (div. 2016) Julija Obrenović (m. 2016)
- Children: 5
- Education: University of Belgrade
- Occupation: Politician; writer; columnist; librarian; publisher
- Profession: Philologist; political scientist

Boško Obradović (Serbian Cyrillic: Бошко Обрадовић; pronounced [bôʃko obrǎːdoʋit͜ɕ]; born 23 August 1976) is a Serbian politician. He is the co-founder and former president of the right-wing political party Dveri. He was the party's nominee for the 2017 and 2022 presidential elections.

== Early life ==
Obradović was born on 23 August 1976 in Vranići, Čačak, SFR Yugoslavia. He studied philology in the University of Belgrade, where he graduated in 2002 after writing his thesis titled "Miloš Crnjanski and the New Nationalism". In 1999, he and some of his classmates started their own publication, Dveri Srpske ("Serbian Gates" in Serbian). The publication group turned into Srpski sabor Dveri ("The Serbian Assembly of Gates" in Serbian) in 2003, after which it eventually became the political party Dveri in 2011.

== Political career ==
The first election during which Obradović ran for higher office was the 2012 Serbian parliamentary election, where his party won 4.34% of the total national vote. Obradović became the leader of Dveri on 25 June 2015. In the 2016 Serbian parliamentary election, Obradović agreed for Dveri to run in a coalition with the Democratic Party of Serbia, who also ran on a eurosceptic platform. The Dveri-DSS coalition received 5% of the national vote, and so Dveri got into the Serbian parliament for the first time.

After Dveri failed to cross the threshold in the 2023 elections, Obradović resigned as president of Dveri on 23 December.

=== 2017 presidential campaign ===
In September 2016, Dveri announced that Obradović would be their candidate for the Serbian presidential election in 2017. Obradović officially started his ground campaign in Čačak on 13 January 2017.

On 3 March 2017, Federica Mogherini visited the Serbian parliament as an envoy of the European Union to discuss Serbia's accession into the European Union. During her speech, Obradović and his party members silently held up signs saying "Serbia does not believe Brussels" written in both English and Serbian. This was in stark contrast to Vojislav Šešelj and the MPs from the Serbian Radical Party, who chanted in protest throughout Mogherini's speech. After the speech, Obradović suggested that he thought the chanting was secretly agreed in advanced as a political stunt between Šešelj and Prime Minister Vučić.

On 28 March 2017, Obradović attended a protest on pensions after being invited by pensioners due to their state-mandated pension reductions. One of Obradović's opponents in the presidential race, Vuk Jeremić, also attended the protest. The next day, he travelled to Germany, where he was invited to visit the parliament of Baden-Württemberg by Jörg Meuthen from the political party Alternative for Germany. In return, Obradović invited Meuthen to visit Serbia as a guest of Dveri.

Obradović placed sixth overall out of the eleven candidates in the presidential election, recording 2.29% of the national vote. After the election, he stated that he was unsatisfied with the results, and that the elections should be held again due to irregularities.

== Political positions ==
=== Foreign policy ===
==== Republika Srpska ====
After the referendum on whether or not Republika Srpska should have its own holiday, Obradović articulated his support for Republika Srpska in an interview with an online YouTube channel Balkan Info which was organised on 18 September 2016. He explained that he would welcome Republika Srpska gaining independence from Bosnia and Herzegovina and subsequently uniting with Serbia. In a later interview with Pravda, Obradović said that the unification of Republika Srpska and Serbia should take the form of a confederacy.

In June 2016, Obradović rejected the "Proposal for a Resolution on Genocide in Srebrenica" in the Serbian parliament, which suggested that 11 July become a national memorial day for the Srebrenica massacre. His party issued a statement regarding the Srebrenica massacre, saying that "genocide did not happen in Srebrenica."

==== Montenegro ====
In an interview with Pravda, Obradović criticised Aleksandar Vučić for arresting 18 Serbian citizens who allegedly participated in the 2015-16 Montenegrin protests, saying that Vučić supports Milo Đukanović remaining in power in Montenegro. In both interviews with Pravda and Balkan Info, Obradović suggested that a referendum in Montenegro should be held on re-unification with Serbia.

=== Social issues ===
==== LGBT rights ====
Shortly after his party entered parliament for the first time in 2016, Obradović was invited to support the Gay Parade in Belgrade on 18 September 2016. However he publicly declined the invitation and denounced the parade, stating that "sexual orientation is not a human right". Obradović attended his party's counter-march to the Gay Parade, called the "Family Walk". In March 2017, a human rights organisation called DA SE ZNA ("Let it be known" in Serbian) sent questionnaires to all 11 of the presidential candidates of the 2017 Serbian presidential election, and Obradović was one of five candidates who responded. In his response, Obradović said that he believed that the LGBT community in Serbia enjoy the same rights as other citizens. He said that he considered sexual orientation a private matter, and that it should not be spoken about publicly. When asked about violence against LGBT people, he responded that he condemns every act of violence. However, he did not support gay marriage in the response, and said that neither he nor his party would support the proposed Law on Birth Identity, a proposed law that would expand transgender people's rights.

==== Military service ====
In 2015, Obradović argued for returning compulsory military service in Serbia. He referred to military service as "one of the most important schools of life", and added that another crucial reason for returning conscription was so that "men can become men again, so that men won't be slackers but men." The issue of conscription has a historical context in Serbia, since in the state of Yugoslavia required conscription when most adults in Serbia were growing up. From 10 to 17 December 2016, sociologist Srećko Mihailović conducted a nationwide survey with a sample size of 1,200 adults on whether Serbia should return conscription, with the results being that 75% of respondents supported a return of conscription in Serbia.

== Personal life ==
Obradović is married with Julija Obrenović since August 2016 and has three children from his first marriage with Vesna Obradović. Obradović opened a restaurant in Čačak in August 2024, where he also works as a waiter.

Party political offices
Preceded by Position established	Leader of Dveri; 2015–present	Incumbent
