= Serbian Patriotic Alliance =

Political party in Serbia

Serbian Patriotic Alliance Српски патриотски савез
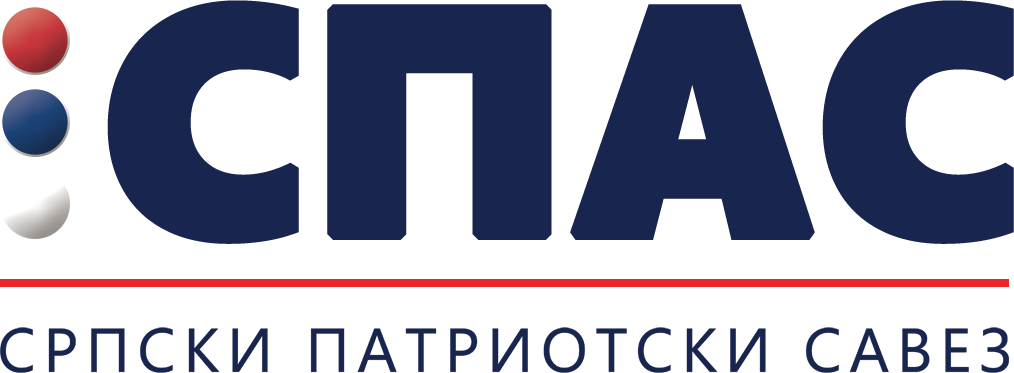
- Abbreviation: SPAS
- President: Aleksandar Šapić
- Founded: 21 July 2018
- Dissolved: 26 May 2021
- Merged into: Serbian Progressive Party
- Headquarters: Bulevar Milutina Milankovića 120b, Belgrade
- Youth wing: Youth Network
- Women's wing: Women's Network
- Ideology: Conservatism; Populism
- Colours: Blue

Website
- patriote.rs (archived)

The Serbian Patriotic Alliance (Serbian: Српски патриотски савез, romanised: Srpski patriotski savez, abbr. SPAS; lit. 'salvation') was a political party in Serbia. It was led by Aleksandar Šapić, the president of the New Belgrade municipality.

The legal predecessor of SPAS was the Movement of United Local Self-Governments (PULS), founded in 2010. PULS took part in several right-wing coalitions during its existence. Shortly after the 2018 Belgrade City Assembly election, it merged with the civic group "Aleksandar Šapić – Mayor" to form SPAS. It later participated in the 2020 parliamentary election, winning 3.83% of the popular vote and 11 seats in the National Assembly. SPAS served as a part of the Serbian Progressive Party-led government until its dissolution. In early May 2021, SNS and SPAS began negotiating about SPAS merging into the Serbian Progressive Party, and on 26 May it was announced to the public that the party had been dissolved. It was officially merged into the SNS three days later.

== History ==
=== Legal predecessor ===
The party's legal predecessor was founded in 2010 under the name of Movement of United Local Self-Governments (PULS), and it represented a local civic group from Kraljevo which was formed out of many local parties and movements. After the local government reshuffle, they became a part of the majority that governed the municipality. In early 2015, PULS became a part of the right-wing "Patriotic Bloc" coalition that was led by Dveri and the Democratic Party of Serbia. PULS left the coalition before the 2016 Serbian parliamentary election.

=== Formation ===
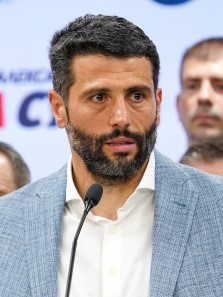
Aleksandar Šapić was the president of SPAS

One of the candidates in the 2018 Belgrade City Assembly election was Aleksandar Šapić, the long-time president of the New Belgrade municipality and a former water polo player, who formed a citizen's group (grupa građana) for the election. Šapić formally announced that his coalition would cooperate with government and opposition parties. Šapić, however, opposed the unification of the opposition into one election coalition for the Belgrade City Assembly election. His group received 9% of the popular vote and 12 seats in the City Assembly. Shortly after the election, Šapić and senior leaders of PULS announced the reformation of PULS under the name of Serbian Patriotic Alliance (SPAS). This change was done without the participation of the president of PULS.

=== Activities ===
In August 2018, Šapić said that one of the party's principles would be to run independently in future elections, without participating in pre-election coalitions. However, in late 2019, SPAS tried to form a local coalition with Healthy Serbia to participate in future local elections; in early January 2020, Šapić changed his mind and coalition negotiations came to a halt. Prior to this, Together for Šumadija had also joined the coalition talks in mid-January.

SPAS previously declared itself as an opponent to the Serbian Progressive Party (SNS) government and opposed election cooperation with opposition parties, going as far to reject joining the major opposition Alliance for Serbia coalition. SPAS successfully filed their ballot under the name "Aleksandar Šapić – Victory for Serbia" to participate in the 2020 parliamentary election and it was accepted by RIK on 12 March. Shortly before the election, Šapić was interviewed by Južne vesti and rejected the speculation of becoming a subject to the ruling SNS. SPAS placed third and won 3.9% of the popular vote and 11 seats in the National Assembly of Serbia. Šapić negotiated with SNS after the elections, and accepted to join the new government in October 2020. Ratko Dmitrović, nominated by SPAS, became the new minister of family welfare and demography. Vladan Glišić, also elected on behalf of SPAS, left the party and served as an independent due to joining the government.

In early October 2020, elections were held in New Belgrade in which Šapić's SPAS won the most seats; Šapić was re-elected president of New Belgrade. Five members of the local city assembly of Kragujevac, led by Veroljub Stevanović, defected from the Healthy Serbia–Together for Šumadija coalition to join SPAS in late November 2020. In April 2021, SPAS participated in the interparty dialogues on electoral conditions. They declined to participate in talks on electoral conditions with European Parliament representatives.

On 5 May 2021, Aleksandar Vučić, the president of Serbia and the leader of SNS, announced that he submitted a proposal to the presidency of the SNS, which was unanimously accepted, to form a working group that would start negotiations with SPAS and its leader Šapić about the unification of the two parties. On the same day, Šapić accepted Vučić's proposal. A meeting between Vučić and Šapić including high-party officials was held on 10 May. On 26 May, Šapić announced that SPAS was dissolved after the approval of the main board. On 29 May, at a SNS session, Šapić was elected vice-president of the party, and a declaration between SPAS and the SNS was also formulated. On 7 June, it was announced that the former MPs of SPAS had formally joined For Our Children, the SNS parliamentary group.

== Ideology and platform ==
SPAS was a conservative and populist party. SPAS supported the accession of Serbia to the European Union. Šapić personally opposed the recognition of Kosovo. After the formation of the party, Šapić commented that "the party will not be pro-American, pro-Russian or pro-French" and that instead it will fight for its national interests. During the 2020 election campaign, SPAS campaigned on promoting election transparency, decentralisation, independent judiciary, and the expansion of the healthcare system. SPAS also supported the legalisation of same-sex relationships.

== Organisation ==
SPAS was led by Aleksandar Šapić. The party had several bodies, including the assembly, main board, presidency, executive board, and political council. SPAS also had special organisational forms such as the Women's Network and Youth Network.

=== List of presidents ===
No.	President	Birth–Death	Term start	Term end
1	Aleksandar Šapić	1978–	21 July 2018	26 May 2021

== Electoral performance ==
=== Parliamentary elections ===
National Assembly of Serbia
Year	Leader	Popular vote	% of popular vote	#	# of seats	Seat change	Status	Ref.
2020	Aleksandar Šapić	123,393	3.98%	▲3rd	11 / 250	▲11	Government	
