= Movement of Workers and Peasants =

Left-wing political party in Serbia

The Movement of Workers and Peasants (Serbian: Покрет Радника и Сељака, romanized: Pokret radnika i seljaka, PRS) was a left-wing political party in Serbia. It was founded in October 2011 by Zoran Dragišić and appears to have become inactive following the 2014 Serbian parliamentary election.

== Origins ==
Dragišić had previously been the leader of a small party called the Independent Social Democrats (Nezavisni Socijaldemokrata, NSD), which had merged into the newly formed Social Democratic Party of Serbia (Socijaldemokratska partija Srbije, SDPS) in 2009. He later became disappointed with the SDPS's direction and left the party to form a new organization.

He was chosen as the leader of the Movement of Workers and Peasants at the party's founding convention in October 2011. At the time, he indicated that the party's purpose would be to "give the state back to the people" and noted that it was supported by a number of worker organizations, including Serbia's Union of Raspberry Producers, the Farmers' Association, and the Pig Breeders of Srem and Mačva.

== 2012 Serbian elections ==
Dragišić ran as the PRS's candidate in the 2012 Serbian presidential election. During the campaign, he pledged to use "all the state power, including the military, to break the backbone of organized crime, corruption and monopoly system in Serbia." He received 60,116 votes (1.54%) in the first round of balloting, finishing tenth. He also led the party's electoral list in the concurrent parliamentary election. The party received 57,199 votes (1.46%) and did not cross the electoral threshold to enter parliament.

The PRS also ran in a number of jurisdictions in the 2012 Serbian local elections.

== Later developments ==
In 2013, the PRS group in Arilje joined the United Regions of Serbia.

The PRS encouraged its supporters to vote for the Serbian Progressive Party (Srpska napredna stranka, SNS) in the 2014 Serbian parliamentary election. Dragišic said that Progressive Party leader and prime minister Aleksandar Vučić deserved to be returned to office for his work in fighting corruption and organized crime. It is not clear if the party continued to exist after this time.

Dragišić was elected to the National Assembly of Serbia in the 2016 Serbian parliamentary election as a non-party candidate on the Progressive Party's list. He was re-elected in the 2020 parliamentary election, once again as a non-party candidate. Former PRS candidate Zoran Tomić was also elected to the national assembly in 2020 as a member of the Progressive Party.
