= Dveri =

Political party in Serbia

Serbian Movement Dveri Српски покрет Двери
- Abbreviation: Dveri
- President: Ivan Kostić
- Vice-Presidents: Slobodan Davidović; Zoran Pavlović
- Founders: Boško Obradović; Branimir Nešić
- Founded: 27 January 1999
- Registered: 28 June 2015
- Headquarters: Đorđa Jovanovića 11/7, Belgrade
- Newspaper: Dveri srpske
- Youth wing: Youth Council
- Women's wing: Women's Power
- Ideology: Serbian nationalism; Economic nationalism; Right-wing populism; Christian right
- Political position: Right-wing to far-right
- Religion: Serbian Orthodox Church
- International affiliation: World Congress of Families
- Colours: Red; Blue; White
- Slogan: "Za život Srbije" ("For the life of Serbia")
- Anthem: "Himna za život Srbije" ("An anthem for the life of Serbia")
- National Assembly: 0 / 250
- Assembly of Vojvodina: 0 / 120
- City Assembly of Belgrade: 0 / 110

Party flag

Website
- dveri.rs
- Politics of Serbia; Political parties; Elections; A: The party is also described as economically left-wing.

The Serbian Movement Dveri (Serbian: Српски покрет Двери, romanised: Srpski pokret Dveri), commonly just known as Dveri (Serbian: Двери, lit. 'doors'), is a nationalist and right-wing populist political party in Serbia. Its current president since 2024 is Ivan Kostić, who succeeded Boško Obradović, one of the co-founders of the party.

Formed as a youth-orientated political organisation in 1999, it published an eponymous student magazine that promoted clerical and nationalist content. Through the 2000s, it operated as a non-governmental organisation that campaigned in favour of Christian right views, that included opposition to abortion and opposition to gay rights. Dveri took part in the 2012 elections where it failed to obtain any seats in the National Assembly, although in the 2016 elections it entered the National Assembly in a joint list with the Democratic Party of Serbia, obtaining 13 seats in total, 7 of which belonged to Dveri. Two years later, it took part in the 2018 Belgrade City Assembly election in a coalition with the Enough is Enough but failed to win seats.

It joined the opposition Alliance for Serbia later that year, and became a prominent voice in the alliance, with whom it boycotted the 2020 parliamentary election. It did not take part in its successor alliance, the United Opposition of Serbia, but remained independent during 2021, after which it formed an electoral coalition with Žika Gojković's faction of the Movement for the Restoration of the Kingdom of Serbia for the 2022 general election. It returned to the National Assembly after the 2022 election, winning 6 seats in total. Together with Serbian Party Oathkeepers, Dveri became a founding member of the National Gathering, which failed to cross the threshold in the 2023 elections.

== History ==
=== Organisation (1999–2011) ===
Dveri were founded by Branimir Nešić in 1999 as a Christian right-wing youth organisation consisting mainly of students from the University of Belgrade which regularly arranged public debates devoted to the popularisation of clerical-nationalist philosophy of Nikolaj Velimirović, a bishop of the Serbian Orthodox Church who was canonised in 2003 and is considered a major anti-Western thinker.

The organisation promotes a pronounced Serbian nationalist ideology. Based on the assessment of partiality and lack of condemnation of crimes by another ethnicity, Dveri opposed a resolution passed by the Serbian parliament in March 2010 which condemned the Srebrenica massacre committed by the Bosnian Serb Army in eastern Bosnia in 1995,. Dveri also fiercely oppose unilateral proclamation of independence of Kosovo. It is also well known for its opposition to gay rights.

In October 2010 the very first Gay Pride parade was held in Belgrade, in which thousands of anti-gay protesters clashed violently with police units securing the parade participants. One of the far-right groups which organised the anti-gay protest were Dveri, and a member of the organisation was quoted by The Economist as saying that the protest was a form of "defence of the family and the future of the Serbian people".

In August 2011, in the run up to the 2011 Pride Parade in Belgrade, the organisation warned that organising such an event could feed social unrest and provoke riots, and added that if the government allowed the march to go forward that "Belgrade will burn like London burned recently". In fear of more violent clashes, the authorities eventually decided to cancel the event, a decision which was criticised by human rights groups such as Amnesty International, which specifically singled out Dveri and Obraz as the main right-wing nationalist groups responsible for "orchestrating opposition to the Pride".

=== Citizen's group (2011–2015) ===
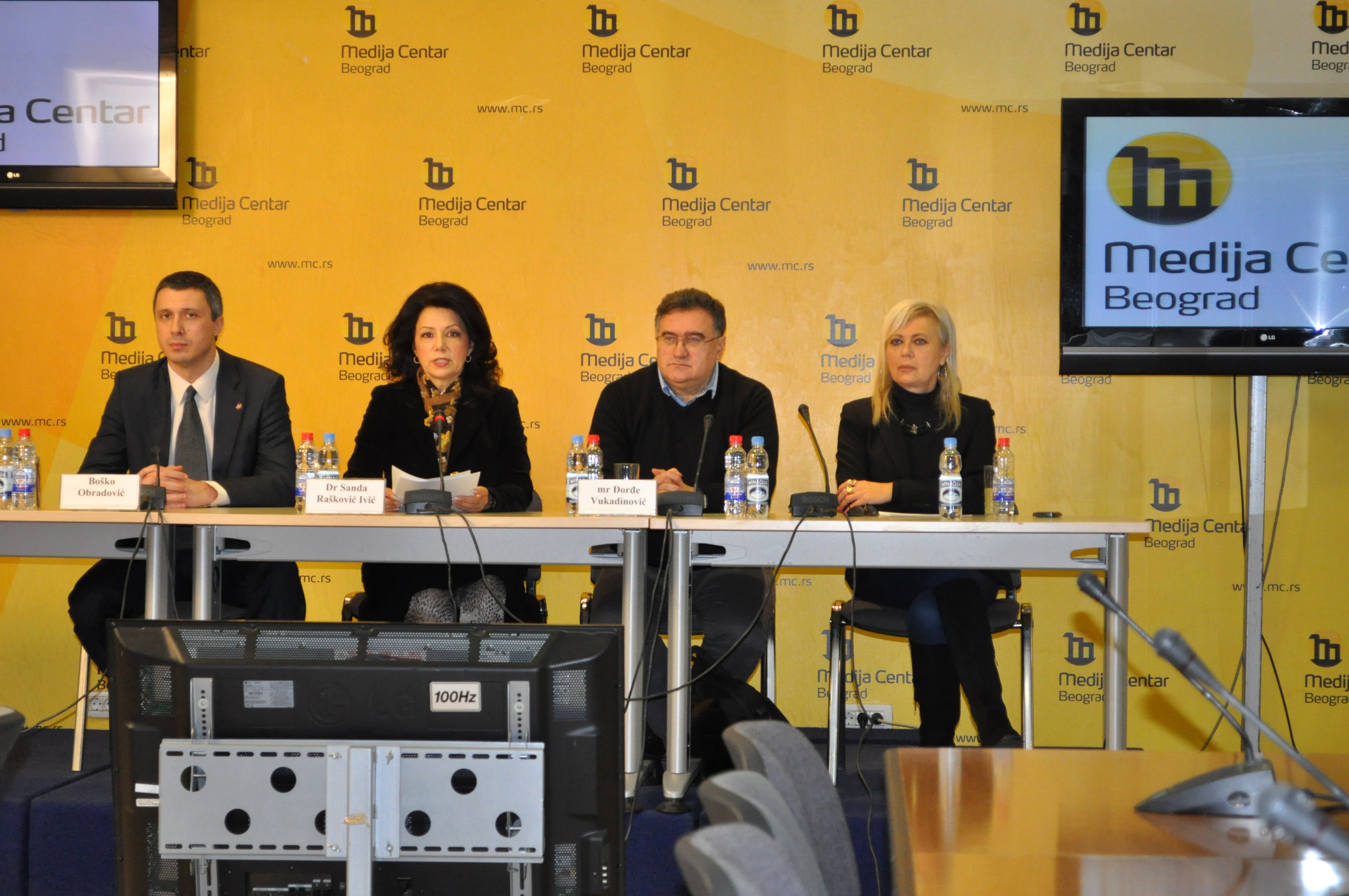
DSS-Dveri coalition in December 2015

In March 2012 the movement collected 14,507 signatures to register as an electoral list for the May 2012 Serbian parliamentary election. The Dveri Movement received 4.35% of the popular vote, failing to pass the 5% minimum threshold to enter parliament.

In September 2012 Dveri leader Vladan Glišić called for a "100-year ban" on pride parades in Belgrade, describing such an event as "promotion of a totalitarian and destructive ideology" and accused the ruling Socialist Party of Serbia of being influenced by a "gay lobby".

In September 2013, in the run-up to another attempted gay pride march in Belgrade, Boško Obradović said that the event amounted to "the imposition of foreign and unsuitable values, laid out before minors - the most vulnerable section of society".

In 2014, the eurosceptic Democratic Party of Serbia of ex-Prime Minister Vojislav Koštunica was considering options about the formation of a "Patriotic Bloc" which would stand up to the political elite's dominating pro-EU stance, the coalition being called forth by the Dveri (with the Serbian Radical Party mentioned as a potential third coalition partner) movement. However, DSS initially rejected the proposal, stating that the proposed parties did not fully embrace DSS positions and that they merely want to join to enter the parliament.

Dveri again ran alone in the March 2014 Serbian parliamentary election, winning 3.58% of the vote, failing again to pass the 5% minimum threshold to enter parliament. They were characterised by many as a far-right party at this point of time. Dveri nominated journalist Marko Janković as their mayoral candidate in the 2014 Belgrade City Assembly election.

=== Modern period (2015–present) ===
In November 2014 Dveri and the Democratic Party of Serbia declared that they would contest the next elections as the "Patriotic Bloc" alliance. In January 2015 PULS and the SLS also joined the bloc. Parliamentary elections were held on 24 April 2016, in which the "Patriotic Bloc" won 5.04% of the vote (13 seats, of which Dveri had 7). After this election, for the first time in history, they became a parliamentary party.

Dveri announced on 3 September 2016 that Boško Obradović, the president of the party, would be their candidate for the 2017 presidential election. Obradović officially started his ground campaign in Čačak on 13 January 2017. He placed sixth overall out of the eleven candidates in the presidential election, recording 2.29% of the national vote.

In 2018, local elections were held in Belgrade and Bor on 4 March and Dveri announced that they will be forming a coalition with Enough is Enough for those elections. In Belgrade, the coalition won 3.89% of the vote.

In 2018 they were one of the founding members of the catch-all opposition Alliance for Serbia. In October 2018, a controversy sparked around the member Srđan Nogo who said that "Ana Brnabić and Aleksandar Vučić should be publicly hanged". Other members of Dveri including the president Boško Obradović opposed this and in early 2019 he was expelled from the party. The coalition was dissolved in August 2020 after an agreement to form a wider coalition of opposition parties called United Opposition of Serbia in which Dveri decided to not participate. In late September, Dveri announced their new political programme called "Promena sistema - sigurnost za sve" which was showcased to the public until the end of 2020. In this new programme, Dveri claimed to have adopted environmentalism and Christian democracy as their ideologies.

Together with the People's Party, Serbian Party Oathkeepers, and New Democratic Party of Serbia, it signed a joint declaration for the "reintegration of Kosovo into the constitutional and legal order of Serbia" in October 2022. In November 2022, Dveri published a text in which it said that "in vitro fertilisation with donated reproductive material from Spain and Denmark could affect the change of genome of Serbs", a statement which was condemned by opposition and government parties.

After Dveri failed to cross the threshold in the 2023 elections, Obradović resigned as president of Dveri on 23 December. Dveri were led by provisional leadership until 29 September 2024 when Ivan Kostić was elected new president. Slobodan Davidović and Zoran Pavlović were elected vice presidents.

== Political positions ==
Political position of Dveri according to political scientists Slobodan Cvejić, Dušan Spasojević, Dragan Stanojević, and Bojan Todosijević.

Dveri was initially orientated towards Christian fundamentalism, clerical-fascism, and ultranationalism. Its ideology was also described as fascist, and antisemitic. During its foundation, Dveri published books and magazines with clerical and nationalist content. It has also campaigned against abortion. Since its foundation, Dveri has been supportive of Christian right views and monarchism. Scholars have also described its ideological stances as xenophobic, due to their Christian right stances. It has also been known as a staunch opponent of gay rights. It advocates "conservative Orthodox positions on social issues", and sees homosexuality as "a foreign imposition" on Eastern Europe.

Dveri has been described as a right-wing, far-right, and radical-right party. It also has been described as nationalist, and conservative. Dveri has been also classified as a right-wing populist party, due to its opposition to illegal immigration, and euroscepticism. Economically, it is supportive of economic nationalism, protectionism, and eco-nationalism. It is economically left-wing, and an analysis of Serbian parties by Friedrich-Ebert-Stiftung described it as "the most leftist party in the entire Electoral Compass field" on economic issues.

Dveri cooperates with the French party Reconquête and the Romanian Alliance for the Union of Romanians. It cooperated with the Alternative for Germany (AfD) and United Russia. It has been described as Russophilic. In December 2023, SSZ and Dveri organised a gathering featuring far-right parties AfD, Hungarian Our Homeland Movement, and Bulgarian Revival.

== Presidents of Dveri ==
#	President	Born–Died	Term start	Term end
1	Boško Obradović	1976–	28 June 2015	23 December 2023
–	Provisional leadership	–	23 December 2023	29 September 2024
2	Ivan Kostić	1975–	29 September 2024	Incumbent

== Electoral performance ==
=== Parliamentary elections ===
National Assembly of Serbia
Year	Leader	Popular vote	% of popular vote	#	# of seats	Seat change	Coalition	Status
2012	Vladan Glišić	169,590	4.54%	▲8th	0 / 250	0	–	Extra-parliamentary
2014	Boško Obradović	128,458	3.69%	▲6th	0 / 250	0	–	Extra-parliamentary
2016	Boško Obradović	190,530	5.19%	6th	7 / 250	▲7	Dveri–DSS	Opposition
2020	Boško Obradović	Election boycott			0 / 250	▼7	SzS	Extra-parliamentary
2022	Boško Obradović	144,762	3.92%	▲6th	6 / 250	▲6	Dveri–POKS	Opposition
2023	Boško Obradović	105,165	2.83%	6th	0 / 250	▼6	NO	Extra-parliamentary
2026	Ivan Kostić	Did not participate			0 / 250	0	Supported SL	Extra-parliamentary

View source data.

=== Presidential elections ===
President of Serbia
Year	Candidate	1st round popular vote		% of popular vote	2nd round popular vote		% of popular vote
2012	Vladan Glišić	8th	108,303	2.90%	—N/a	—	—
2017	Boško Obradović	6th	83,523	2.32%	—N/a	—	—
2022	Boško Obradović	4th	165,181	4.46%	—N/a	—	—

== See also ==
- Serbian nationalism
- List of political parties in Serbia
