= Koritnik (disambiguation) =

Koritnik may refer to:

- Koritnik, mountain located in north-eastern Albania and south of Kosovo
- Koritnik (Breza), village in the municipality of Breza, Bosnia and Herzegovina
- Koritnik (Višegrad), village in the municipality of Višegrad, Bosnia and Herzegovina
- Koritnik (Ivanjica), village in the municipality of Ivanjica in Serbia
