= Banknotes of the Yugoslav dinar =

The banknotes of the Yugoslav dinar were several series of paper money printed by the central bank of the Kingdom of Yugoslavia and the Socialist Federal Republic of Yugoslavia.

After the breakup of Yugoslavia, there were also banknotes of the Yugoslav dinar in the Federal Republic of Yugoslavia.

== 1919 dinar ==
The first dinar banknotes printed by the Kingdom of Serbs, Croats, and Slovenes were ½, 1, 5, 10, 20, 100, and 1000 dinar banknotes printed in 1919. They were the continuation of the pre-WWI Serbian dinar and had the same value. The banknotes were overstamped with the value in Austro-Hungarian krone (Serbo-Croatian: Kruna) to make the conversion easier (in the rate 1 dinar = 4 krone). Some ½ and 1 dinar banknotes were issued before the overstamping started, so they had no krone value stamped. The stamp on the 1 dinar = 4 krone banknote had a printing error: instead of the Cyrillic text "4 КРУНЕ", the text read "4 КУРНЕ".

1919 "Dinar - Kruna" Series
Image	Value	Image size (mm)	Main Colour	Obverse	Reverse	First printed date	Issued	Withdrawn
	½ dinara = 2 krune	80 х 51	red	coat of arms of the Kingdom	Indication of value (in French)		1919	31 December 1925
	1 dinar = 4 krune	110 x 77	yellow	Miloš Obilić	Indication of value (in French)		1919	31 December 1925
	5 dinara = 20 kruna	110 x 75	violet	Miloš Obilić	Indication of value (in French)		1919	24 December 1921
	10 dinara = 40 kruna	153 x 92	blue	a metalsmith	Indication of value (in French)	1 February 1919	1919	10 August 1923
	20 dinara = 80 kruna	150 x 90	brown	a man ploughing	Harvest	1 February 1919	1919	17 January 1921
	100 dinara = 400 kruna	177 x 112	red	four boys	Four female busts		1919	17 January 1929
	1,000 dinara = 4,000 kruna	240 x 132	blue	two female busts and four figures in a circle	six figures		1919	17 January 1929

== 1920 dinar ==
The first dinar note was the ¼ dinara (25 para) note issued in 1921 by the Ministry of the Finances of the Kingdom of Serbs, Croats, and Slovenes. Starting in 1922, the National Bank of the Kingdom of Serbs, Croats and Slovenes issued notes for 10, 100, and 1,000 dinara. The 10 dinara note was engraved and printed by the American Bank Note Company. In 1926 the design of the 10 dinara bill was changed.

1920–1921 Series
Image	Value	Image size (mm)	Main Colour	Obverse	Reverse	First printed date	Issued	Withdrawn
	¼ dinara (25 para)	92 x 62	blue (obverse) Red (reverse)	Gračanica Monastery	Lake Bled with a church; Ban Jelačić statue in Zagreb	21 March 1921	14 June 1921	30 September 1927
	10 dinara	142 x 81	blue	male nude with wheel	rocky landscape	1 November 1920	5 August 1922	18 July 1935
	100 dinara	156 x 80	yellow	a woman with sword; Belgrade skyline	ships and a peasant boy	30 November 1920	1 January 1925	10 July 1941
	1,000 dinara	182 x 108	violet	Saint George and the Dragon	man ploughing, different cities (Sarajevo, Belgrade, Ljubljana, and Zagreb)	30 November 1920	11 April 1923	1 March 1936
1926 Issue
	10 dinara	115 x 68	red	a woman with a laurel wreath	coat of arms, silhouette of a church	26 May 1926	25 July 1928	4 May 1936
These images are to scale at 0.7 pixel per millimetre (18 pixel per inch). For table standards, see the banknote specification table.

Following the change of the country's name to Yugoslavia in 1929, the bank notes changed as well. New 10 dinara notes were printed that were the same as the old ones with a changed name and a new design of 100 dinara note was issued. In the following years each, other denominations were redesigned, including the 1,000 dinara notes in 1931 and 500 dinara notes in 1935.

1929–1935 Series
Image		Value	Image size (mm)	Paper size (mm)	Colour	Obverse	Reverse	First printed date	Issued	Withdrawn
Obverse	Reverse	Value	Image size (mm)	Paper size (mm)	Colour	Obverse	Reverse	First printed date	Issued	Withdrawn
		10 dinara	115 x 68		red	a woman with a laurel wreath	coat of arms, silhouette of a church	1 December 1929	21 January 1931	4 May 1936
		100 dinara	115 x 68		violet	a woman with sword; Belgrade skyline	ships and a peasant boy	1 December 1929	21 January 1931	10 July 1941
		500 dinara	169 x 100	183 x 114	blue	King Peter	women harvesting	6 September 1935	1 January 1937	10 July 1941
		1,000 dinara	181 x 112	195 x 121	yellow	Queen Maria of Yugoslavia	two women: one with a sickle and wheat; another with sword and coat-of-arms	1 December 1931	1 January 1933	11 June 1941
Reserve banknotes
		10 dinara	115 x 60		green	King Peter; Old Bridge in Mostar	a woman	22 September 1939	early April 1941	21 November 1941
		20 dinara	125 x 70		brown	King Peter	a woman	6 September 1936	early April 1941	21 November 1941
		50 dinara	134 x 78		brown	King Aleksandar	Ivan Meštrović's statue of Prince Marko riding his horse Šarac	1 December 1931	early April 1941	22 October 1941
		100 dinara		171 x 104	violet	a woman and a soldier	two working women, city of Dubrovnik in background	15 July 1934	Never officially issued, but some notes were circulated.	
		1,000 dinara		190 x 122		three horsemen and a woman; a teacher and a pupil	a fisherman and a blacksmith	6 September 1935	Never officially issued, but some notes were circulated.	
		10,000 dinara		230 x 115	brown	King Peter	two farm workers	6 September 1936	Never officially issued, but some notes were circulated.	
These images are to scale at 0.7 pixels per millimetre, a standard for world banknotes. Source:

== 1944 dinar ==
In 1944, the Democratic Federation of Yugoslavia issued notes for 1, 5, 10, 20, 50, 100, 500, and 1,000 dinara.

1944 Series
Image	Value	Size (mm)	Colour	Obverse	Reverse	First printed date	Issued	Withdrawn
	1 dinar	95 x 50	grey-brown	partisan with a gun	coat of arms indication of value	1944	20 April 1945	1 July 1956
	5 dinara	99 x 55	blue	partisan with a gun	coat of arms indication of value	1944	20 April 1945	1 July 1956
	10 dinara	100 x 55	yellow-brown	partisan with a gun	coat of arms indication of value	1944	20 April 1945	1 October 1959
	20 dinara	106 x 58	brown-red	partisan with a gun	coat of arms indication of value	1944	20 April 1945	1 October 1959
	50 dinara	120 x 65	lilac	partisan with a gun	coat of arms indication of value	1944	20 April 1945	1 January 1950
	100 dinara	130 x 70	dark gray-green	partisan with a gun	coat of arms indication of value	1944	20 April 1945	1 May 1948
	500 dinara	133 x 74	brown	partisan with a gun	coat of arms indication of value	1944	20 April 1945	26 September 1948
	1,000 dinara	140 x 75	dark green	partisan with a gun	coat of arms indication of value	1944	20 April 1945	26 January 1947
These images are to scale at 0.7 pixels per millimetre, a standard for world banknotes. Source:

== 1946 dinar ==
These were followed in 1946 by notes of the National Bank of Yugoslavia for 50, 100, 500, and 1,000 dinara. New 100 banknote was issued in 1953. The new banknotes were issued in 1955 for 100, 500, 1,000, and 5,000 dinara.

1946 Series
Image	Value	Image size (mm)	Colour	Obverse	Reverse	First printed date	Issued	Withdrawn
	50 dinara	112 x 53	yellow	a miner	a lumberjack	1 May 1946	1 December 1949	1 October 1960
	100 dinara	121 x 56	brown	a blacksmith and a harvester	a fisherman	1 May 1946	10 October 1947	1 September 1962
	500 dinara	132 x 63	brown	a partisan	farmer ploughing	1 May 1946	10 September 1948	1 September 1963
	1,000 dinara	145 x 67	brown	working woman	Jajce waterfall and a figure of a woman with a sword	1 May 1946	10 January 1947	1 January 1966
1953 Issue
	100 dinara	140 x 68	brown	a locomotive in production	harvest	1 May 1953	26 April 1954	1 February 1957
1955 Series
	100 dinara	127 x 60	red	a woman	Dubrovnik	1 May 1955	25 April 1957	1 February 1968
	500 dinara	135 x 64	green	woman with sickle	harvest	1 May 1955	25 April 1957	1 January 1969
	1,000 dinara	143 x 68	brown	Arif Heralić	Zenica Steel Mill	1 May 1955	25 April 1957	1 January 1969
	5,000 dinara	151 x 72	dark blue	relief by Ivan Meštrović at the Federal Parliament building	Federal Parliament building	1 May 1955	25 April 1957	1 January 1969
These images are to scale at 0.7 pixels per millimetre, a standard for world banknotes. Source:

Two series of 1946 dinar banknotes were printed, but never issued. One was the "reserve" series with the printing date of 1950 that was made up of 10 banknotes: 1, 2, 5, 10, 20, 50, 100, 500, 1000, and 5000 dinara. It was kept for emergency purposes, but was never issued to circulation. All banknotes were eventually destroyed in the middle 1970s. Another is a series of six banknotes (10, 20, 50, 100, 1000, and 5000 dinara) with the printing dates of 1949, 1950, and 1951. It was probably intended as a replacement for the 1946 series (and 10-20 dinara banknotes from the 1944 series that were still in circulation), but was never issued to circulation. The 100 dinara banknote from this series was slightly altered and issued in 1954 with the printed date of 1 May 1953 (see above).

1949-1951 Unisued series
Image	Value	Image size (mm)	Colour	Obverse	Reverse	First printed date	Issued	Withdrawn
	10 dinara	105 × 45	brown	indication of value		1951	never issued	
	20 dinara	108 × 47	dark blue	indication of value		1951	never issued	
	50 dinara	165 × 80	dark green	Partisans in fight	harvest	1 May 1950	never issued	
	100 dinara	140 × 68	blue and black	a locomotive in production	harvest	1 May 1949	never issued	
	1,000 dinara	165 × 80	green	tractor drivers and harvesters	bricklayers and miners	1 May 1949	never issued	
	5,000 dinara	166 × 80	gray-blue	a ship in the harbour	steel mill workers	1 November 1950	never issued	
1950 "Reserve" series
	1 dinar	80 x 34	blue	indication of value	Emblem of Yugoslavia	1950	never issued	
	2 dinara	88 x 37	red	indication of value	Emblem of Yugoslavia	1950	never issued	
	5 dinara	93 x 40	light violet	indication of value	Emblem of Yugoslavia	1950	never issued	
	10 dinara	100 x 43	green	female partisan	Emblem of Yugoslavia	1950	never issued	
	20 dinara	105 x 45	brown		Emblem of Yugoslavia	1950	never issued	
	50 dinara	113 x 48	green	woman with a sickle	Emblem of Yugoslavia	1950	never issued	
	100 dinara	122 x 53	violet and blue		Emblem of Yugoslavia	1950	never issued	
	500 dinara	135 x 58	violet and blue	relief of a partisan	Emblem of Yugoslavia	1950	never issued	
	1000 dinara	148 x 64	brown		Emblem of Yugoslavia	1950	never issued	
	5000 dinara	148 x 64	gray-green		Emblem of Yugoslavia	1950	never issued	
These images are to scale at 0.7 pixels per millimetre, a standard for world banknotes.								

== 1965 dinar ==
1965 saw the first revaluation of the dinar since the World War II.

In 1965, banknotes were introduced in denominations of 5, 10, 50, and 100 dinara. They used the same obverse design as the 1955 notes. 500 dinara notes were added in 1970, followed by 20 and 1,000 dinara in 1974. 5,000 dinara notes featuring a portrait of the late President Josip Broz Tito were added in 1985. As inflation worsened into hyperinflation, banknotes for 20,000 dinara were introduced in 1987, followed by 50,000 dinara in 1988 and 100,000, 500,000, 1,000,000, and 2,000,000 dinara in 1989. The 500,000 and 2,000,000 dinara notes were unusual in that they did not feature a portrait but an image of the monument on Kozara.

1965 Series
Image	Value	Size (mm)	Colour	Obverse	Reverse	First printed date	Issued	Withdrawn
	5 dinara	135 x 64	green	woman with sickle	tractors	1 August 1965	31 December 1965	1 January 1980
	10 dinara	143 x 68	brown	Arif Heralić	Zenica Steel Mill	1 August 1965	31 December 1965	1 January 1980
	50 dinara	151 x 72	blue	relief by Ivan Meštrović at the Parliament building in Belgrade	Federal Parliament Building	1 August 1965	31 December 1965	1 January 1980
	100 dinara	147 x 70	red	The Monument of Peace by Antun Augustinčić in New York in front of the main UN building.	Indication of value	1 August 1965	1 April 1968	1 January 1990
1968–1989 Series
	5 dinara	123 x 58½	green	woman with sickle	Indication of value	1 May 1968	1 October 1968	1 October 1988
	10 dinara	131 x 62¼	brown	Arif Heralić	Indication of value	1 May 1968	1 November 1968	31 December 1989
	20 dinara	139 x 66	violet	ship dockside	Indication of value	19 December 1974	28 November 1975	31 December 1989
	50 dinara	139 x 66	blue	relief by Ivan Meštrović at the Parliament building in Belgrade	Indication of value	1 May 1968	1 November 1968	31 December 1989
	500 dinara	155 x 74	dark green	statue of Nikola Tesla by Frano Kršinić	Indication of value	1 August 1970	1 August 1971	1 January 1990
	1,000 dinara	163 x 78	grey	woman with fruits	Indication of value	19 December 1974	28 November 1975	30 June 1990
	5,000 dinara	164½ x 75	blue	Josip Broz Tito	Jajce	1 May 1985	9 December 1985	30 June 1990
	20,000 dinara	169½ x 77½	brown	Alija Sirotanović	mining excavator	1 May 1987	1 September 1987	31 December 1991
	50,000 dinara	174½ x 80	green	a woman	Dubrovnik	1 May 1988	5 September 1988	31 December 1991
	100,000 dinara	179½ x 82½	red	a girl	digital art of a human eye	1 May 1989	1 June 1989	31 December 1991
	500,000 dinara	145 × 75	violet	Battle of Kozara Memorial	Battle of Sutjeska Memorial	August 1989	21 August 1989	31 March 1991
	1,000,000 dinara	151 x 72	yellow	a young woman	a spike of wheat	1 November 1989		15 July 1991
	2,000,000 dinara	145 × 75	dark green and brown	Battle of Kozara Memorial	Šumarice memorial	August 1989	11 August 1989	31 March 1991
These images are to scale at 0.7 pixels per millimetre, a standard for world banknotes. Source:

== 1990 dinar ==
In 1990, notes were introduced for 10, 50, 100, 200, 500, and 1,000 dinara, some of which had designs very similar to those used for the corresponding notes of the previous currency. In 1991, 5,000 dinara notes were added. The 1991 emergency issue retains all previous characteristics save for the designation SFR, a detail representative of the changes within the country.

1990 Series
Obverse	Reverse	Value	Size (mm)	Colour	Obverse	Reverse	First printed date	Issued	Withdrawn
		10 dinara	139 × 66	red	a girl	digital art of a human eye	1 September 1990	26 November 1990	4 July 1992
		50 dinara	145 × 75	violet	Battle of Kozara Memorial	Battle of the Sutjeska Memorial	1 January 1990	3 January 1990	31 March 1991
		50 dinara	147 × 70	purple	a boy	rose flowers	1 June 1990	10 July 1990	4 July 1992
		100 dinara	151 × 72	yellow	young woman	spike of wheat	1 March 1990		31 December 1991
		200 dinara	145 × 75	dark green and brown	Battle of Kozara Memorial	Šumarice memorial	1 January 1990	3 January 1990	31 March 1991
		500 dinara	159 × 76	blue	young man	mountain	1 March 1990	27 April 1990	31 December 1991
		1,000 dinara	163 × 78	brown	Nikola Tesla	Tesla coil	26 November 1990	30 January 1991	31 December 1991
1991 Series (Emergency notes)
		10 dinara	139 x 66	purple	a girl	digital art of a human eye	1991	Never Issued	
		50 dinara	147 x 70	red	a boy	rose flowers	1991	Never Issued	
		100 dinara	151 × 72	green	young woman	spike of wheat	1991	25 December 1991	4 July 1992
		500 dinara	159 × 76	brown	young man	mountain	1991	25 December 1991	4 July 1992
		1,000 dinara	163 × 78	blue	Nikola Tesla	Tesla coil	1991	25 December 1991	4 July 1992
		5,000 dinara	167 × 80	dark blue	Ivo Andrić	Mehmed Paša Sokolović Bridge	1991	25 December 1991	4 July 1992
These images are to scale at 0.7 pixels per millimetre, a standard for world banknotes. Source:

== Sources ==
- Pick, Albert (1994). Bruce, Colin R. II; Shafer, Neil (eds.). Standard Catalog of World Paper Money: General Issues (7th ed.). Krause Publications. ISBN 0-87341-207-9.
- Pick, Albert (1996). Bruce, Colin R. II; Shafer, Neil (eds.). Standard Catalog of World Paper Money: General Issues to 1960 (8th ed.). Krause Publications. ISBN 0-87341-469-1.
- Yugoslavian banknotes at Infotech 2003
- Ron Wise's Banknoteworld: Yugoslavia
