= Slivno =

Slivno may refer to:

- Slivno, Dubrovnik-Neretva County, a municipality in southern Croatia
- Slivno, Slovenia, a village near Laško
- Slivno, Split-Dalmatia County, a village near Runovići, Croatia
- Slivno, Šibenik-Knin County, a village near Šibenik, Croatia
- Slivno, Breza, a village in Bosnia and Herzegovina
