= Banjevac, Breza =

Banjevac Бањевац
- Village
- Location within Bosnia and Herzegovina
- Coordinates: 44.0232°N 18.2415°E
- Country: Bosnia and Herzegovina
- Entity: Federation of Bosnia and Herzegovina
- Canton: Zenica-Doboj
- Municipality: Breza

Area
  - Total: 0.21 sq mi (0.54 km^{2})

Population (2013)
  - Total: 585
  - Density: 2,800/sq mi (1,100/km^{2})
- Time zone: UTC+1 (CET)
  - Summer (DST): UTC+2 (CEST)

Banjevac (Serbian: Бањевац) is a village in the municipality of Breza, Bosnia and Herzegovina.

== Demographics ==
According to the 2013 census, its population was 585.

Ethnicity in 2013
Ethnicity	Number	Percentage
Bosniaks	554	94.7%
Croats	8	1.4%
Serbs	7	1.2%
other/undeclared	16	2.7%
Total	585	100%
