= Obren Joksimović =

Serbian surgeon and politician (1952–2021)

- Обрен Јоксимовић

Minister of Health
- In office 25 January 2001 – 22 October 2001
- Prime Minister: Zoran Đinđić
- Preceded by: Nada Kostić
- Succeeded by: Uroš Jovanović (acting)

Personal details
- Born: 15 May 1952 Očevlje, Breza, PR Bosnia-Herzegovina, FPR Yugoslavia
- Died: 13 March 2021 (aged 68) Belgrade, Serbia
- Party: SRS (2008-2021); DZS (2006-2008); DSS (1995-2006); SPO (1990-1995)
- Education: University of Belgrade
- Occupation: Politician

Obren Joksimović (Serbian Cyrillic: Обрен Јоксимовић; 15 May 1952 – 13 March 2021) was a Serbian surgeon and politician who served as Minister of Health in the Government of Serbia from 25 January 2001 to 22 October 2001.

== Biography ==
Joksimović was born on 15 May 1952 to a Bosnian Serb family in Očevlje, Breza at that time part of PR Bosnia and Herzegovina and FPR Yugoslavia.

He graduated in 1979 at the Faculty of Medicine, University of Belgrade, and specialized in general surgery in 1988.

During the Bosnian War, he participated as a volunteer on numerous battlefields as a war surgeon of the Army of Republika Srpska and at the same time he was a member of the Federal Assembly of FR Yugoslavia as a member of the Serbian Renewal Movement (since 1992). In 1995, angry and dissatisfied, Joksimović resigned from the parliament and joined the Democratic Party of Serbia together with several other party colleagues.

He was appointed the Minister of Health in the cabinet of Zoran Đinđić and the Government of Serbia on 25 January 2001 and served until 22 October 2001.

In September 2004, he defended his doctoral dissertation at Megatrend University, Faculty of Management in Zaječar (whose teacher he became immediately afterwards).

He was the leader of Democratic Community of Serbia, which emerged from the Democratic Party of Serbia.

Joksimović died from COVID-19 on 13 March 2021, in Belgrade at the age of 68.

Government offices
Preceded by Nada Kostić	Minister of Health of Serbia; 2001	Succeeded by Uroš Jovanović (acting)
