= Alija Sirotanović =

Yugoslav coal miner (1914–1990)

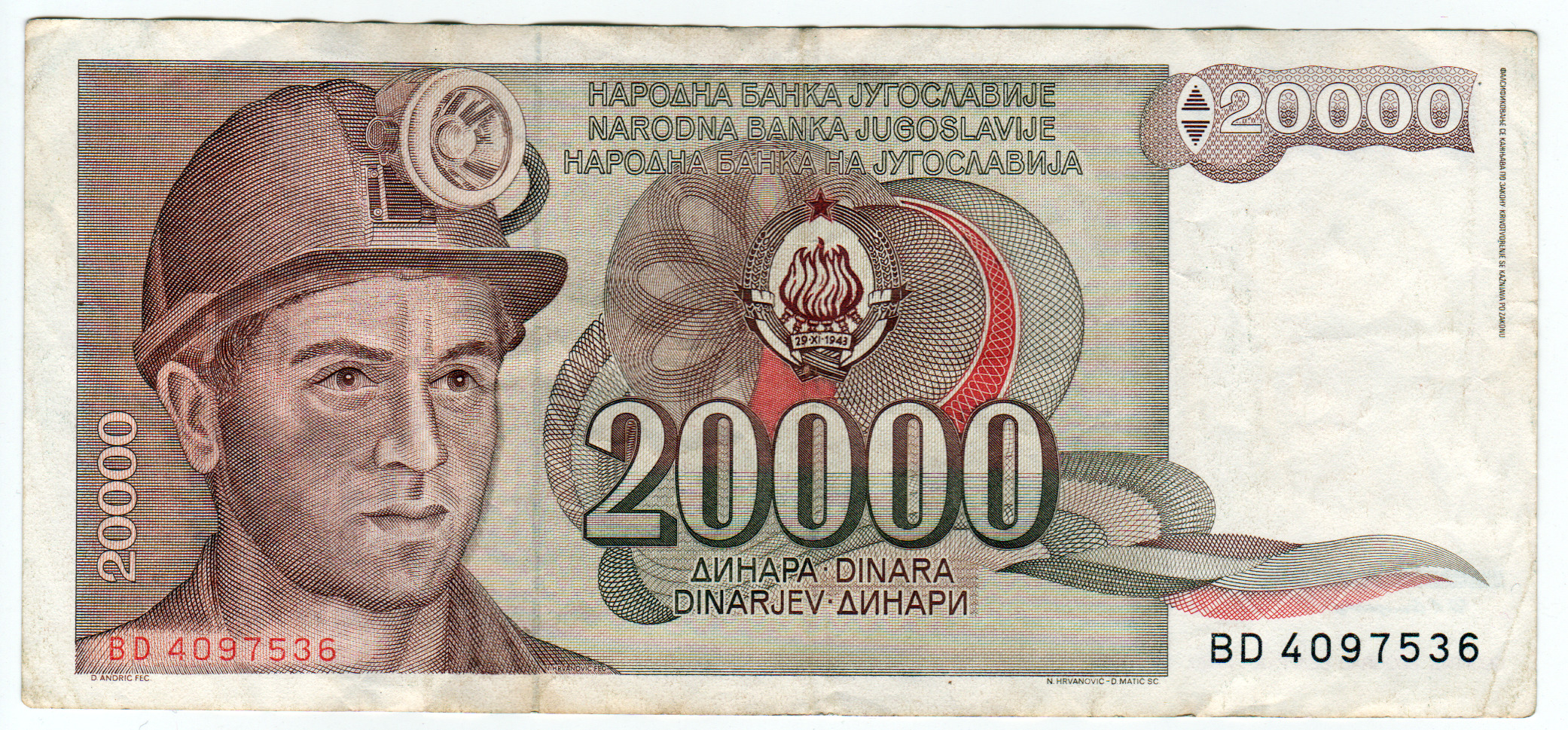
- Sirotanović on the 20,000 Yugoslav dinar banknote issued in 1987
- Born: 14 August 1914; Breza, Condominium of Bosnia and Herzegovina, Austria-Hungary
- Died: 16 May 1990 (aged 75); Breza, SR Bosnia and Herzegovina, SFR Yugoslavia

Alija Sirotanović (14 August 1914 – 16 May 1990) was a Yugoslav miner, Hero of Socialist Labour and perhaps the most famous of all Yugoslav udarniks. He was held up by the Communist Party of Yugoslavia to be a model of a hard-worker in the former Yugoslavia.

== Early life and family ==
Alija Sirotanović, a Bosniak, was born in Orahovo, a village in central Bosnia near the town of Breza, and grew up in Trtorići, another nearby village. He was born in 1914, while Bosnia and Herzegovina was a part of Austria-Hungary. He had six brothers and two sisters, all of whom were miners. One of his brothers, Ahmed, died in a mining disaster in 1970.

== Mining record and fame ==
Sirotanović worked in the coal mine in Breza. In 1947 Sirotanović set a record in coal extracting. On 24 July 1949, Sirotanović participated in an inter-mine competition at the mine at Kreka. He and his eight-man crew mined 128 carloads of brown coal, which is 152 tons of coal, in a single 8-hour shift, some 40 tonnes more than the first record of Soviet 'hero of labour' Alexey Stakhanov, although this is in dispute. The achievements of the Yugoslav miners were published on news front pages for weeks. In September 1949, the first "formal meeting of the initiators of the movement for high productivity" (svečani sastanak inicijatora pokreta za visoku produktivnost) was held, in which famous productive working record-holders participated, such as Alija Sirotanović, Nikola Skobić, Risto Mijatović, Antun Bičić, Alojz Petek, and others.

As there was a Soviet–Yugoslav rift at the time of the contest, his accomplishment was widely praised and publicised by the Communist Party of Yugoslavia. Josip Broz Tito is said to have offered to fulfill any wish Sirotanović had, but all Sirotanović is reported to have requested was a bigger shovel. Tito granted his wish, and the larger shovel that was designed for him was later named after him: Sirotanovićka. He was offered an apartment in Breza, but he refused and decided to stay in his house in Trtorići. The meeting between Sirotanović and leading politician Svetozar Vukmanović was televised.

Sirotanović tried to enter politics, but was unsuccessful. He was a member of the federal parliament for one term. He was retired with pension for merits. He was made an honorary member of the Union of Associations of Engineers and Technicians of Yugoslavia.

== Legacy ==
He was held up by the Communist Party of Yugoslavia to be a model of a hard-worker. However, if the mining sector in Bosnia and Herzegovina successfully adapts to the green transition, he may evolve from a socialist symbol of labor to a symbol of the 'European individual' contributing to national advancement.

Yugoslav rock band Galija originally wanted to use provocative image of Sirotanović with a blindfold for the cover of their 1986 studio album Digni ruku (Raise Your Hand); however, the cover was refused by their record label PGP-RTB as politically overtly provocative. In 1987, Yugoslav rock band Zabranjeno Pušenje recorded a song titled "Srce, ruke i lopata" ("Heart, Hands and Shovel"), paying tribute to "Comrade Avdija", the model of a hard working, modest man.

=== Banknote ===
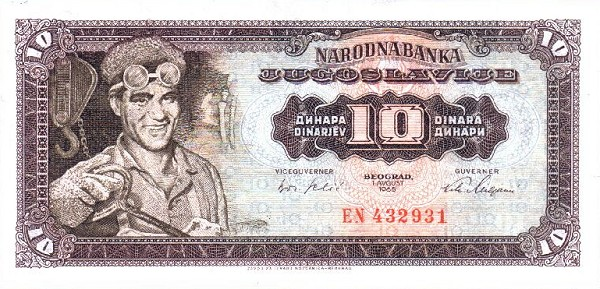
The famous 10-dinar banknote, which does not show Sirotanović

He was pictured on the 20,000-Yugoslav dinar banknote (shown at the top), which was brought out on May Day 1987.

He was often incorrectly claimed to be pictured on the older (1955) 10-dinar banknote. Despite obvious similarities, the 10-dinar banknote and its 1000-old-dinar predecessor with the same design showed Arif Heralić, a metal worker working on a blast furnace in Zenica.
