= Smrekovica =

Smrekovica may refer to:

- Smrekovica, Bosnia and Herzegovina, a village near Breza
- Smrekovica massif, a mountain in the Branisko (mountain range), Slovakia
