= Podgora, Breza =

Podgora
- Village
- Location within Bosnia and Herzegovina
- Coordinates: 43°59′23″N 18°17′25″E
- Country: Bosnia and Herzegovina
- Entity: Federation of Bosnia and Herzegovina
- Canton: Zenica-Doboj
- Municipality: Breza

Area
  - Total: 1.04 sq mi (2.70 km^{2})

Population (2013)
  - Total: 542
  - Density: 520/sq mi (201/km^{2})
- Time zone: UTC+1 (CET)
  - Summer (DST): UTC+2 (CEST)

Podgora is a village in the municipality of Breza, Bosnia and Herzegovina.

== Demographics ==
According to the 2013 census, its population was 542.

Ethnicity in 2013
Ethnicity	Number	Percentage
Bosniaks	532	98.2%
other/undeclared	10	1.8%
Total	542	100%
