= Izbod =

- Village
- Location within Bosnia and Herzegovina
- Coordinates: 44°00′N 18°17′E
- Country: Bosnia and Herzegovina
- Entity: Federation of Bosnia and Herzegovina
- Canton: Zenica-Doboj
- Municipality: Breza

Area
  - Total: 0.45 sq mi (1.16 km^{2})

Population (2013)
  - Total: 382
  - Density: 853/sq mi (329/km^{2})
- Time zone: UTC+1 (CET)
  - Summer (DST): UTC+2 (CEST)

Izbod is a village in the municipality of Breza, Bosnia and Herzegovina.

== Demographics ==
According to the 2013 census, its population was 382.

Ethnicity in 2013
Ethnicity	Number	Percentage
Bosniaks	368	96.3%
other/undeclared	14	3.7%
Total	382	100%
