= Mahmutovića Rijeka =

- Village
- Location within Bosnia and Herzegovina
- Coordinates: 44°03′N 18°21′E
- Country: Bosnia and Herzegovina
- Entity: Federation of Bosnia and Herzegovina
- Canton: Zenica-Doboj
- Municipality: Breza

Area
  - Total: 2.10 sq mi (5.45 km^{2})

Population (2013)
  - Total: 15
  - Density: 7.1/sq mi (2.8/km^{2})
- Time zone: UTC+1 (CET)
  - Summer (DST): UTC+2 (CEST)

Mahmutovića Rijeka is a village in the municipality of Breza, Bosnia and Herzegovina.

== Demographics ==
According to the 2013 census, its population was 15.

Ethnicity in 2013
Ethnicity	Number	Percentage
Bosniaks	14	93.3%
Croats	1	6.7%
Total	15	100%
