= Potkraj, Breza =

Potkraj Поткрај
- Village
- Location within Bosnia and Herzegovina
- Coordinates: 44°00′17″N 18°15′01″E
- Country: Bosnia and Herzegovina
- Entity: Federation of Bosnia and Herzegovina
- Canton: Zenica-Doboj
- Municipality: Breza

Area
  - Total: 0.63 sq mi (1.63 km^{2})

Population (2013)
  - Total: 625
  - Density: 993/sq mi (383/km^{2})
- Time zone: UTC+1 (CET)
  - Summer (DST): UTC+2 (CEST)

Potkraj (Serbian: Поткрај) is a village in the municipality of Breza, Bosnia and Herzegovina.

== Demographics ==
According to the 2013 census, its population was 625.

Ethnicity in 2013
Ethnicity	Number	Percentage
Bosniaks	591	94.6%
Serbs	16	2.6%
Croats	5	0.8%
other/undeclared	13	2.1%
Total	625	100%
