= Očevlje =

Očevlje Очевље
- Village
- Location within Bosnia and Herzegovina
- Coordinates: 43°59′30″N 18°18′39″E
- Country: Bosnia and Herzegovina
- Entity: Federation of Bosnia and Herzegovina
- Canton: Zenica-Doboj
- Municipality: Breza

Area
  - Total: 1.65 sq mi (4.27 km^{2})

Population (2013)
  - Total: 0
  - Density: 0.0/sq mi (0.0/km^{2})
- Time zone: UTC+1 (CET)
  - Summer (DST): UTC+2 (CEST)

Očevlje (Serbian: Очевље) is a village in the municipality of Breza, Bosnia and Herzegovina. According to the 1991 census, there were 47 inhabitants in the settlement.

== Demographics ==
According to the 2013 census, its population was nil, down from 47 in 1991.

== Notable people ==
- Obren Joksimović, Serbian surgeon and politician
