= Nasići =

Nasići Насићи
- Village
- Location within Bosnia and Herzegovina
- Coordinates: 44°00′41″N 18°20′51″E
- Country: Bosnia and Herzegovina
- Entity: Federation of Bosnia and Herzegovina
- Canton: Zenica-Doboj
- Municipality: Breza

Area
  - Total: 0.94 sq mi (2.43 km^{2})

Population (2013)
  - Total: 8
  - Density: 8.5/sq mi (3.3/km^{2})
- Time zone: UTC+1 (CET)
  - Summer (DST): UTC+2 (CEST)

Nasići (Serbian: Насићи) is a village in the municipality of Breza, Bosnia and Herzegovina.

== Demographics ==
According to the 2013 census, its population was 8.

Ethnicity in 2013
Ethnicity	Number	Percentage
Croats	7	87.5%
Serbs	1	12.5%
Total	8	100%
