= Župča =

Župča Жупча
- Village
- Location within Bosnia and Herzegovina
- Coordinates: 43°59′N 18°16′E
- Country: Bosnia and Herzegovina
- Entity: Federation of Bosnia and Herzegovina
- Canton: Zenica-Doboj
- Municipality: Breza

Area
  - Total: 1.07 sq mi (2.77 km^{2})

Population (2013)
  - Total: 1,445
  - Density: 1,350/sq mi (522/km^{2})
- Time zone: UTC+1 (CET)
  - Summer (DST): UTC+2 (CEST)

Župča (Serbian: Жупча) is a village in the municipality of Breza, Bosnia and Herzegovina.

== Demographics ==
According to the 2013 census, its population was 1,445.

Ethnicity in 2013
Ethnicity	Number	Percentage
Bosniaks	1,410	97.6%
Croats	1	0.1%
other/undeclared	34	2.4%
Total	1,445	100%
