= Seoce (Breza) =

Seoce Сеоце
- Village
- Location within Bosnia and Herzegovina
- Coordinates: 44°01′25″N 18°17′43″E
- Country: Bosnia and Herzegovina
- Entity: Federation of Bosnia and Herzegovina
- Canton: Zenica-Doboj
- Municipality: Breza

Area
  - Total: 1.67 sq mi (4.32 km^{2})

Population (2013)
  - Total: 4
  - Density: 2.4/sq mi (0.93/km^{2})
- Time zone: UTC+1 (CET)
  - Summer (DST): UTC+2 (CEST)

Seoce (Cyrillic: Сеоце) is a village in the municipality of Breza, Bosnia and Herzegovina.

== Demographics ==
According to the 2013 census, its population was 4, all Bosniaks.
