= Nada Kostić =

Serbian medical doctor, academic, and politician (born 1956)

- Нада Костић
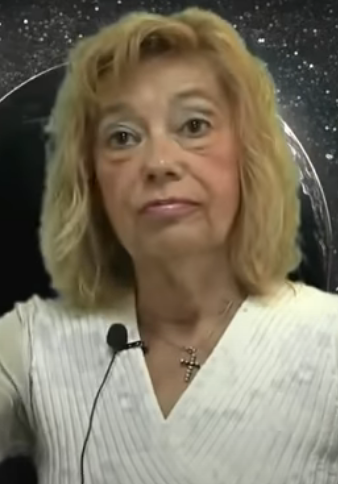
- Born: 17 May 1956 (age 70); Belgrade, PR Serbia, FPR Yugoslavia
- Occupations: Doctor, politician

Nada Kostić (Serbian Cyrillic: Нада Костић; born 17 May 1956) is a Serbian medical doctor, academic, and politician. She briefly served as Serbia's minister of health in the transitional government that was established after the fall of Slobodan Milošević's administration in 2000. She has also served in the National Assembly of Serbia on two occasions.

Kostić promoted conspiracy theories related to COVID-19 in 2020.

== Early life and private career ==
Kostić was born in Belgrade, in what was then the People's Republic of Serbia in the Federal People's Republic of Yugoslavia. She is a graduate of the University of Belgrade, having studied at its faculty of medicine and faculty of philosophy (department of clinical psychology). She received a master's degree in 1989 and a Ph.D. in 1993. Kostić has served as a professor at the university's faculty of medicine and as director of the internal medicine clinic at the Dedinje Institute for Cardiovascular Diseases.

== Politician ==
=== Early years ===
Kostić joined the Democratic Party of Serbia (Demokratska stranka Srbije, DSS) on its formation in 1992. The party contested the 1992 Serbian parliamentary election as part of the Democratic Movement of Serbia (DEPOS) alliance, and Kostić received the twenty-fourth position on its electoral list in Belgrade. The party won fifteen seats in the city, and she was not afterwards selected as part of its parliamentary delegation. (From 1992 to 2000, Serbia's electoral law stipulated that one-third of parliamentary mandates would be assigned to candidates from successful lists in numerical order, while the remaining two-thirds would be distributed amongst other candidates on the lists by the sponsoring parties. It was common practice for the latter mandates to be assigned out of numerical order. Kostić could have been awarded a mandate despite her relatively low position on the list, although in the event she was not.)

The DSS had left DEPOS by the time of the 1993 Serbian parliamentary election and contested the election on its own. Kostić received the sixth position on the party's list in Belgrade. The DSS won four seats in the city, and she was not initially selected for its delegation. She did, however, receive a mandate on 30 June 1997 as the replacement for Dragoljub Popović.

Her first term in parliament was brief. The 1997 parliamentary election was called shortly after she received her mandate, and the DSS chose to boycott the vote. Her mandate ended when the new assembly convened on 3 December.

=== Serbian cabinet minister ===
After the fall of Slobodan Milošević's administration in October 2000, Serbia was governed by a coalition of the Socialist Party of Serbia (SPS), the Democratic Opposition of Serbia (DOS), and the Serbian Renewal Movement (SPO) until new elections could be called and a new government formed. The DOS was itself a coalition of several opposition parties, including the DSS. The party received the ministry of health in the new coalition government, and Kostić was appointed as minister on October 24, 2000.

In January 2001, Kostić indicated that the ministry of health would appoint a commission of scientists and doctors to monitor the possible long-term effects on the Serbian population of depleted uranium munitions fired by North Atlantic Treaty Organization (NATO) forces in the 1999 NATO bombing of Yugoslavia. She added that "there [was] no reason for panic" in the matter, and her ministry indicated that there was no evidence of immediate danger.

The Democratic Opposition of Serbia won a landslide victory in the 2000 Serbian parliamentary election. After the election, the Democratic Party of Serbia nominated Obren Joksimović to replace Kostić as health minister. Joksimović's nomination was criticized by many in the health sector; a group of doctors in Požarevac referred to him as unsuited for the role while describing Kostić as "the kind of person whose professional and ethical qualities fully suit a ministerial role, something that she has demonstrated in the work in the Serbian interim government and in her public appearances so far." This notwithstanding, Joksimović's nomination went through and Kostić stood down from the ministry on January 25, 2001. She resigned from the Democratic Party of Serbia on the same day.

=== September–October 2002 Serbian presidential election ===
Kostić joined the political group of the Christian Democratic Party of Serbia in November 2001 and was their candidate for president of Serbia in the September–October 2002 Serbian presidential election. Her slogan was "Nada for Serbia" (the word "Nada" means "hope" in Serbian). She withdrew from the election prior to the vote, when the party decided to back the candidacy of Miroljub Labus.

During the early part of her political career, Kostić did not express the controversial views with which she was later associated.

=== Second national assembly term ===
Kostić returned to political life in 2016, appearing in the eighteenth position on electoral list of the Enough Is Enough (Dosta je bilo, DJB) movement in the 2016 Serbian parliamentary election. The list won sixteen mandates, and she was not immediately elected. She also appeared in the third position on the DJB's list for the Stari Grad municipal assembly in the concurrent 2016 Serbian local elections and was elected when the list won eight seats.

Kostić left DJB shortly after the 2016 election, citing differences with the association's leadership. She appeared in the twelfth position on the electoral list of Nikola Sandulović's Republican Party in the 2018 Belgrade city assembly election, although she later said that she had been included on the list without her permission. The party did not, in any event, win any mandates.

In March 2018, DJB delegate Miloš Bošković announced his resignation from the assembly; Kostić was the next candidate on the movement's list eligible to receive a mandate. The newspaper Danas reported that she was ready to serve with the DJB group in the assembly despite past disagreements. This notwithstanding, she choose to sit as an independent member after receiving a mandate on April 17. She also indicated that she had taken out a membership in the Democratic Party (Demokratska stranka; DS) after leaving DJB two years earlier; when asked why she did not join the DS group in the assembly, she responded that it would not be appropriate for her to do so as she had been elected on a different list.

On May 15, 2018, Kostić joined the Movement for the Restoration of the Kingdom of Serbia (POKS). She indicated that her decision was made partly for practical reasons, as she had limited opportunities to engage in parliamentary activities as an independent member. She also said that she supported replacing the Serbia's republican form of government with a constitutional monarchy. POKS leader Žika Gojković welcomed Kostić into the party and said that she would be a member of its presidency. Later in the same month, however, Kostić left the POKS to once again sit as an independent member.

In May 2020, Kostić presented conspiracy theories related to the COVID-19 pandemic that involved, among other things, the 5G network, Bill Gates, George Soros, and an opposition to vaccination. These comments were criticized in the Serbian media.

She was not a candidate in the 2020 Serbian parliamentary election. Her term ended on 3 August 2020.

Government offices
Preceded by Milovan Bojić	Minister of Health of Serbia; 2000–2001	Succeeded by Obren Joksimović
