= Smailbegovići =

Smailbegovići Смаилбеговићи
- Village
- Location within Bosnia and Herzegovina
- Coordinates: 44°0′30.31″N 18°15′2.28″E
- Country: Bosnia and Herzegovina
- Entity: Federation of Bosnia and Herzegovina
- Canton: Zenica-Doboj
- Municipality: Breza

Area
  - Total: 0.39 sq mi (1.02 km^{2})

Population (2013)
  - Total: 484
  - Density: 1,230/sq mi (475/km^{2})
- Time zone: UTC+1 (CET)
  - Summer (DST): UTC+2 (CEST)

Smailbegovići (Serbian: Смаилбеговићи) is a village in the municipality of Breza, Bosnia and Herzegovina.

== Demographics ==
According to the 2013 census, its population was 484.

Ethnicity in 2013
Ethnicity	Number	Percentage
Bosniaks	483	99.8%
other/undeclared	1	0.2%
Total	484	100%
