= Vardište =

- Village
- Location within Bosnia and Herzegovina
- Coordinates: 44°03′09″N 18°17′02″E
- Country: Bosnia and Herzegovina
- Entity: Federation of Bosnia and Herzegovina
- Canton: Zenica-Doboj
- Municipality: Breza

Area
  - Total: 2.31 sq mi (5.98 km^{2})

Population (2013)
  - Total: 272
  - Density: 118/sq mi (45.5/km^{2})
- Time zone: UTC+1 (CET)
  - Summer (DST): UTC+2 (CEST)

Vardište is a village in the municipality of Breza, Bosnia and Herzegovina.

== Demographics ==
According to the 2013 census, its population was 272, all of which are Bosniaks.
