= Mahala (Breza) =

Mahala Махала
- Village
- Location within Bosnia and Herzegovina
- Coordinates: 44°00′43″N 18°15′19″E
- Country: Bosnia and Herzegovina
- Entity: Federation of Bosnia and Herzegovina
- Canton: Zenica-Doboj
- Municipality: Breza

Area
  - Total: 0.18 sq mi (0.46 km^{2})

Population (2013)
  - Total: 902
  - Density: 5,100/sq mi (2,000/km^{2})
- Time zone: UTC+1 (CET)
  - Summer (DST): UTC+2 (CEST)

Mahala (Serbian Cyrillic: Махала) is a village in the municipality of Breza, Bosnia and Herzegovina.

== Demographics ==
According to the 2013 census, its population was 902.

Ethnicity in 2013
Ethnicity	Number	Percentage
Bosniaks	878	97.3%
Croats	2	0.2%
other/undeclared	22	2.4%
Total	902	100%
