= Prhinje (Breza) =

Prhinje Прхиње
- Village
- Location within Bosnia and Herzegovina
- Coordinates: 44°01′19″N 18°13′41″E
- Country: Bosnia and Herzegovina
- Entity: Federation of Bosnia and Herzegovina
- Canton: Zenica-Doboj
- Municipality: Breza

Area
  - Total: 0.45 sq mi (1.16 km^{2})

Population (2013)
  - Total: 011
  - Density: 25/sq mi (9.5/km^{2})
- Time zone: UTC+1 (CET)
  - Summer (DST): UTC+2 (CEST)

Prhinje (Serbian: Прхиње) is a village in the municipality of Breza, Bosnia and Herzegovina.

== Demographics ==
According to the 2013 census, its population was 101, all Bosniaks.
