= Sutješćica =

- Village
- Location within Bosnia and Herzegovina
- Coordinates: 44°02′N 18°16′E
- Country: Bosnia and Herzegovina
- Entity: Federation of Bosnia and Herzegovina
- Canton: Zenica-Doboj
- Municipality: Breza

Area
  - Total: 0.63 sq mi (1.63 km^{2})

Population (2013)
  - Total: 159
  - Density: 253/sq mi (97.5/km^{2})
- Time zone: UTC+1 (CET)
  - Summer (DST): UTC+2 (CEST)

Sutješćica is a village in the municipality of Breza, Bosnia and Herzegovina.

== Demographics ==
According to the 2013 census, its population was 159.

Ethnicity in 2013
Ethnicity	Number	Percentage
Bosniaks	149	93.7%
Croats	4	2.5%
other/undeclared	6	3.8%
Total	159	100%
