= Kamenice (Breza) =

Kamenice Каменице
- Village
- Location within Bosnia and Herzegovina
- Coordinates: 44°00′19″N 18°15′55″E
- Country: Bosnia and Herzegovina
- Entity: Federation of Bosnia and Herzegovina
- Canton: Zenica-Doboj
- Municipality: Breza

Area
  - Total: 0.64 sq mi (1.67 km^{2})

Population (2013)
  - Total: 774
  - Density: 1,200/sq mi (463/km^{2})
- Time zone: UTC+1 (CET)
  - Summer (DST): UTC+2 (CEST)

Kamenice (Serbian Cyrillic: Каменице) is a village in the municipality of Breza, Bosnia and Herzegovina.

== Demographics ==
According to the 2013 census, its population was 774.

Ethnicity in 2013
Ethnicity	Number	Percentage
Bosniaks	747	96.5%
Croats	3	0.4%
other/undeclared	24	3.1%
Total	774	100%
