= Vijesolići =

Vijesolići Вијесолићи
- Village
- Location within Bosnia and Herzegovina
- Coordinates: 44°02′N 18°14′E
- Country: Bosnia and Herzegovina
- Entity: Federation of Bosnia and Herzegovina
- Canton: Zenica-Doboj
- Municipality: Breza

Area
  - Total: 1.25 sq mi (3.25 km^{2})

Population (2013)
  - Total: 557
  - Density: 444/sq mi (171/km^{2})
- Time zone: UTC+1 (CET)
  - Summer (DST): UTC+2 (CEST)

Vijesolići (Serbian: Вијесолићи) is a village in the municipality of Breza, Bosnia and Herzegovina.

== Demographics ==
According to the 2013 census, its population was 557.

Ethnicity in 2013
Ethnicity	Number	Percentage
Bosniaks	550	98.7%
other/undeclared	7	1.3%
Total	557	100%
