= Založje =

Založje Заложје
- Village
- Location within Bosnia and Herzegovina
- Coordinates: 44°01′18″N 18°14′56″E
- Country: Bosnia and Herzegovina
- Entity: Federation of Bosnia and Herzegovina
- Canton: Zenica-Doboj
- Municipality: Breza

Area
  - Total: 0.51 sq mi (1.33 km^{2})

Population (2013)
  - Total: 580
  - Density: 1,100/sq mi (440/km^{2})
- Time zone: UTC+1 (CET)
  - Summer (DST): UTC+2 (CEST)

Založje (Serbian: Заложје) is a village in the municipality of Breza, Bosnia and Herzegovina.

== Demographics ==
According to the 2013 census, its population was 580.

Ethnicity in 2013
Ethnicity	Number	Percentage
Bosniaks	560	96.6%
Croats	10	1.7%
Serbs	1	0.2%
other/undeclared	9	1.6%
Total	580	100%
