= Gornja Breza =

Gornja Breza Горња Бреза
- Village
- Location within Bosnia and Herzegovina
- Coordinates: 44°02′N 18°15′E
- Country: Bosnia and Herzegovina
- Entity: Federation of Bosnia and Herzegovina
- Canton: Zenica-Doboj
- Municipality: Breza

Area
  - Total: 1.05 sq mi (2.73 km^{2})

Population (2013)
  - Total: 379
  - Density: 360/sq mi (139/km^{2})
- Time zone: UTC+1 (CET)
  - Summer (DST): UTC+2 (CEST)

'Gornja Breza is a village in the municipality of Breza, Bosnia and Herzegovina.

== Demographics ==
According to the 2013 census, its population was 379.

Ethnicity in 2013
| Ethnicity | Number | Percentage |
|---|---|---|
| Bosniaks | 366 | 96.6% |
| other/undeclared | 13 | 3.4% |
| Total | 379 | 100% |
