= 1971 population census in Bosnia and Herzegovina =

10th Census of Bosnia and Herzegovina
31 March 1971
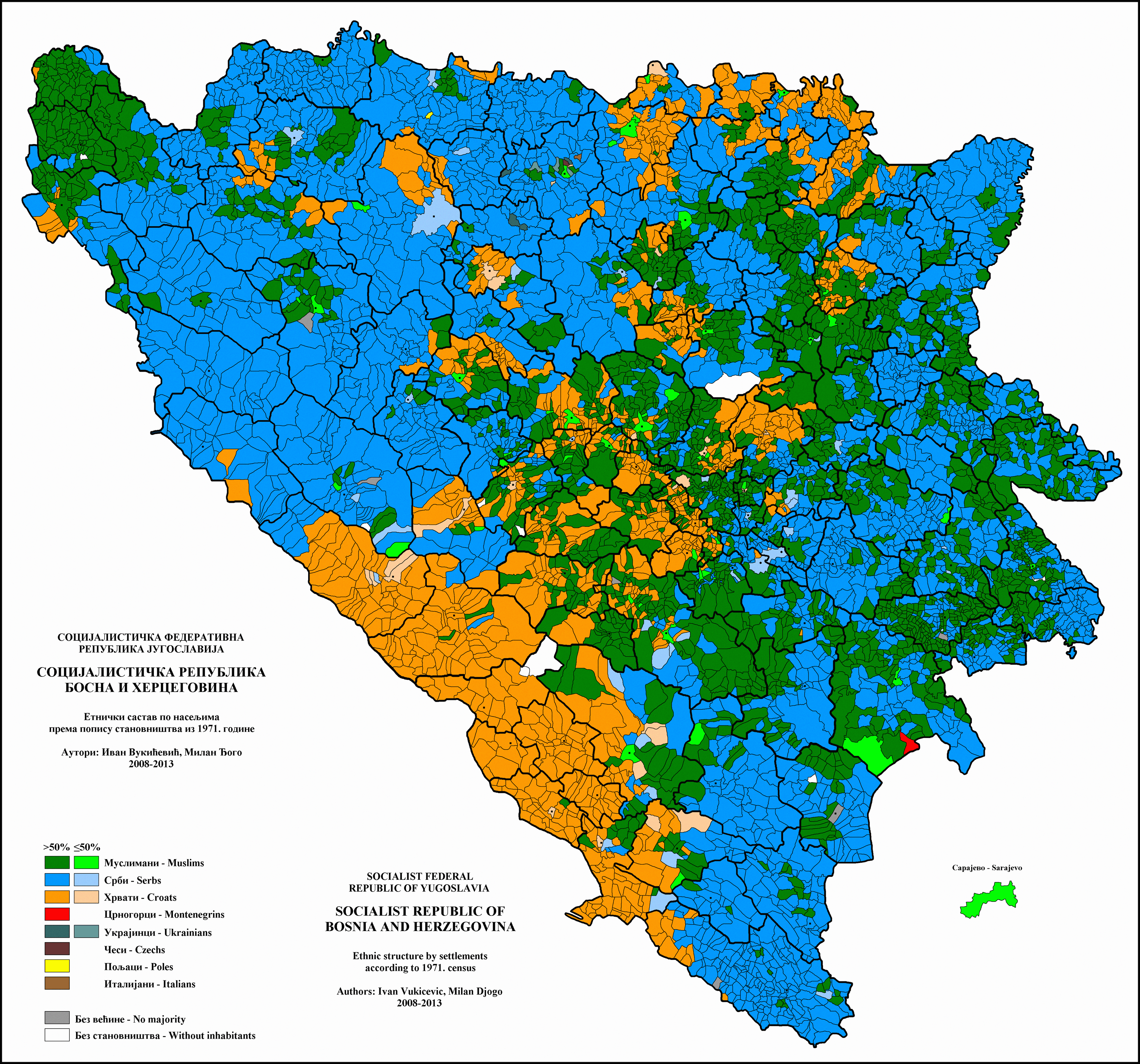
- Ethnic map of Bosnia and Herzegovina in 1971 by settlements

General information
- Country: Socialist Republic of Bosnia and Herzegovina

Results
- Total population: 3,746,111

Population of Bosnia and Herzegovina in 1971 by nationality
1. ethnic Muslims (39.6%)
2. Serbs (37.2%)
3. Croats (20.6%)
4. Yugoslavs (1.17%)
5. Others (1.45%)

The 1971 population census in Bosnia and Herzegovina was the tenth census of the population of Bosnia and Herzegovina. The Socialist Federal Republic of Yugoslavia conducted a population census on 31 March 1971. 3,746,111 people populated the territory of Socialist Republic of Bosnia and Herzegovina at the time.

== Overall ==
Nationality	Number	Percentage	Number change	Percentage change
ethnic Muslims	1,482,430	39,57%	▲640,183	▲13,88%
Serbs	1,393,148	37,19%	▼12,905	▼5,7%
Croats	772,491	20,62%	▲60,831	▼1,1%
Yugoslavs	43,796	1,17%	▼232,087	▼7,25%
Montenegrins	13,021	0,35%	▲193	▼0,04%
Ukrainians	5,333	0,14%	Steady	Steady
Slovenes	4,053	0,11%	▼1,886	▼0,07%
Albanians	3,764	0,10%	▲122	Steady
Macedonians	1,773	0,05%	▼618	▼0,2%
Roma	1,456	0,04%	▲868	▲0,02%
Hungarians	1,262	0,03%	▼153	▼0,01%
Czechs	871	0,02%	▼212	▼0,01%
Poles	757	0,02%	▼44	Steady
Jews	708	0,02%	▲327	▲0,01%
Italians	673	0,02%	▼44	Steady
Russians	507	0,01%	▼427	▼0,02%
Turks	477	0,01%	▼1,334	▼0,05%
Germans	300	0,01%	▼47	Steady
Slovaks	279	0,01%	▲7	Steady
Romanians	189	0,01%	▲76	Steady
Rusyns	141	<0,01%	Steady	Steady
Others	602	0,02%	▼209	Steady
Undeclared	8,482	0,23%	Steady	Steady
Unknown	9,598	0,26%	▲7,713	▲0,20%
Total	3,746,111	-	▲468,176	-

=== Results by municipality ===
Legend:

absolute majority	relative majority
Muslims	Muslims
Serbs	Serbs
Croats	Croats

Municipality	Total	ethnic Muslims	Serbs	Croats	Yugoslavs	Others
Sarajevo	359,452	161,088	130,138	41,354	13,551	13,321
* Vogošća	14,402	5,938	6,728	1,186	247	303
* Ilijaš	23,007	9,187	10,941	2,172	400	307
* Ilidža	39,452	12,462	18,627	6,446	954	963
* Novo Sarajevo	111,811	37,147	45,806	17,491	5,798	5,569
* Pale	16,119	4,508	11,230	142	80	159
* Trnovo	9,555	6,342	3,093	50	12	58
* Hadžići	18,508	11,150	6,055	964	116	223
* Centar	126,598	74,354	27,658	12,903	5,944	5,739
Banovići	20,334	14,409	4,441	919	363	202
Banja Luka	158,736	24,268	92,465	33,371	4,684	3,948
Bijeljina	86,826	23,343	60,595	806	747	1,335
Bileća	13,444	2,079	10,880	82	69	334
Bihać	58,185	37,325	12,096	6,824	1,133	807
Bosanska Gradiška	53,581	12,688	35,038	4,415	415	1,025
Bosanska Dubica	30,384	5,114	23,989	717	403	161
Bosanska Krupa	50,856	31,842	18,230	286	239	259
Bosanski Brod	30,115	3,706	11,273	14,489	436	211
Bosanski Novi	41,216	11,625	28,328	640	366	257
Bosanski Petrovac	18,597	3,315	14,941	76	154	111
Bosanski Šamac	31,374	2,192	14,230	14,336	481	135
Bosansko Grahovo	10,555	14	10,100	364	37	40
Bratunac	26,513	13,428	12,820	50	15	200
Breza	14,824	10,659	2,333	1,446	225	161
Brčko	74,771	30,181	17,709	24,925	1,086	870
Bugojno	31,856	13,050	6,295	12,040	197	274
Busovača	14,428	5,896	735	7,646	60	91
Vareš	23,523	6,631	5,166	11,134	307	285
Velika Kladuša	36,079	32,110	2,845	742	191	191
Visoko	35,503	25,683	7,166	1,914	392	348
Vitez	20,628	8,527	1,502	10,196	178	225
Višegrad	25,389	15,752	9,225	68	141	203
Vlasenica	26,623	12,881	13,431	42	17	252
Gacko	12,033	4,184	7,634	15	20	180
Glamoč	16,979	2,621	13,870	378	31	79
Goražde	34,685	24,544	9,293	179	168	501
Gornji Vakuf	19,344	10,482	141	8,605	18	98
Gradačac	48,384	26,905	12,455	8,447	321	256
Gračanica	46,950	33,135	13,135	199	184	297
Grude	19,203	0	32	19,111	5	55
Derventa	56,141	6,548	23,124	25,228	575	666
Doboj	88,985	32,418	39,884	14,754	1,124	805
Donji Vakuf	20,393	10,528	8,767	924	90	84
Drvar	20,064	213	19,496	141	74	140
Duvno	33,135	2,760	970	29,272	40	93
Žepče	16,906	7,531	2,028	7,174	56	117
Živinice	40,335	32,319	3,133	4,404	147	332
Zavidovići	44,018	24,803	11,031	7,457	353	374
Zvornik	60,910	32,504	27,769	107	49	481
Zenica	112,447	61,204	21,875	24,658	2,133	2,577
Jablanica	10,938	7,429	698	2,511	124	176
Jajce	35,002	14,001	8,132	12,376	208	285
Kakanj	47,580	25,142	6,233	15,479	301	425
Kalesija	32,577	24,771	7,606	40	23	137
Kalinovik	9,458	3,796	5,536	44	20	62
Kiseljak	18,335	6,822	924	10,389	55	145
Kladanj	14,015	9,300	4,487	66	63	99
Ključ	39,966	15,226	23,892	534	131	183
Konjic	40,879	21,599	6,669	12,034	202	375
Kotor Varoš	32,832	8,366	15,255	8,863	176	172
Kreševo	6,941	1,484	118	5,284	23	32
Kupres	11,496	763	6,252	4,425	18	38
Laktaši	25,997	341	21,986	2,731	84	855
Livno	42,118	5,087	4,791	31,657	434	149
Lištica	27,285	43	234	26,940	12	56
Lopare	33,847	11,621	20,497	1,537	43	149
Lukavac	51,781	34,010	13,526	3,111	613	521
Ljubinje	4,837	532	4,170	62	17	56
Ljubuški	28,269	1,812	118	26,198	49	92
Maglaj	38,037	15,628	13,888	7,946	240	335
Modriča	31,622	8,356	13,457	9,418	180	211
Mostar	89,580	33,645	19,076	32,782	2,329	1,748
Mrkonjić Grad	30,159	2,734	24,990	2,204	98	133
Nevesinje	19,333	4,370	14,479	384	28	72
Neum	4,781	218	224	4,281	13	45
Novi Travnik	22,847	8,200	4,129	9,852	301	365
Olovo	15,203	10,546	3,601	930	46	80
Orašje	25,740	1,867	4,266	19,354	131	122
Odžak	25,901	4,777	5,881	14,995	85	163
Posušje	16,882	15	58	16,778	8	23
Prijedor	97,921	39,190	46,487	8,845	1,458	1,941
Prnjavor	46,734	6,143	35,177	2,148	96	3,170
Prozor	17,963	5,988	94	11,792	42	47
Rogatica	25,501	15,096	10,208	45	62	90
Rudo	15,982	5,532	10,155	18	80	197
Sanski Most	62,102	24,839	30,422	6,307	195	339
Skender Vakuf	21,419	947	15,926	4,431	9	106
Sokolac	17,053	5,790	11,006	128	23	106
Srbac	21,226	1,018	19,469	203	34	502
Srebrenik	33,620	24,628	5,489	3,256	34	213
Srebrenica	33,357	20,968	11,918	109	121	241
Stolac	19,230	7,113	4,900	7,041	63	113
Teslić	52,713	10,000	32,756	9,467	108	382
Tešanj	34,693	24,200	2,692	7,603	39	159
Travnik	55,822	24,480	7,554	22,645	626	517
Trebinje	29,024	4,846	19,362	3,350	424	1,042
Tuzla	107,293	53,271	21,089	27,735	2,540	2,658
Ugljevik	24,178	8,859	14,816	53	35	415
Fojnica	12,829	6,473	223	5,948	85	100
Foča	48,741	25,766	21,458	218	102	1,197
Han Pijesak	7,804	2,921	4,790	16	7	70
Cazin	45,468	43,880	1,196	175	51	166
Čajniče	11,602	6,065	5,353	29	14	141
Čapljina	23,459	6,781	3,672	12,603	193	210
Čelinac	17,430	1,209	15,880	90	14	237
Čitluk	15,359	183	64	15,055	0	57
Šekovići	10,570	286	10,241	6	2	35
Šipovo	18,035	2,952	14,970	35	9	69
Total	3,746,111	1,482,430 (39,57%)	1,393,148 (37,18%)	772,491 (20,62%)	43,796 (1,16%)	54,246 (1,44%)
