= Vlahinje =

Vlahinje Влахиње
- Village
- Location within Bosnia and Herzegovina
- Coordinates: 44°00′N 18°18′E
- Country: Bosnia and Herzegovina
- Entity: Federation of Bosnia and Herzegovina
- Canton: Zenica-Doboj
- Municipality: Breza

Area
  - Total: 2.13 sq mi (5.52 km^{2})

Population (2013)
  - Total: 1
  - Density: 0.47/sq mi (0.18/km^{2})
- Time zone: UTC+1 (CET)
  - Summer (DST): UTC+2 (CEST)

Vlahinje (Serbian: Влахиње) is a village in the municipality of Breza, Bosnia and Herzegovina.

== Demographics ==
According to the 2013 census, its population was just 1, a Bosniak.
