= Vrbovik =

- Village
- Location within Bosnia and Herzegovina
- Coordinates: 43°59′N 18°15′E
- Country: Bosnia and Herzegovina
- Entity: Federation of Bosnia and Herzegovina
- Canton: Zenica-Doboj
- Municipality: Breza

Area
  - Total: 0.34 sq mi (0.89 km^{2})

Population (2013)
  - Total: 462
  - Density: 1,300/sq mi (520/km^{2})
- Time zone: UTC+1 (CET)
  - Summer (DST): UTC+2 (CEST)

Vrbovik is a village in the municipality of Breza, Bosnia and Herzegovina.

== Demographics ==
According to the 2013 census, its population was 462.

Vrbovik
Year	2013.	1991.	1981.	1971.
Bosniaks	447 (96.8%)	508 (96.21%)	420 (99.05%)	355 (99.16%)
Serbs	0	0	0	0
Croats	0	0	0	0
Yugoslavs	0	14 (2.65%)	2 (0.47%)	0
Others and unknowns	15 (3.2%)	6 (1.13%)	2 (0.47%)	3 (0.83%)
Total	462	528	424	358
