= Democratic Community of Serbia =

Democratic Community of Serbia Демократска заједница Србије Demokratska zajednica Srbije
- Leader: Obren Joksimović
- Founded: June 2006; 20 years ago
- Dissolved: January 2008; 18 years ago
- Split from: Democratic Party of Serbia
- Merged into: Serbian Radical Party
- Headquarters: Zagrebačka 9, Belgrade
- Ideology: Serbian nationalism National conservatism
- Political position: Right-wing

Website
- http://www.dzs.org.yu/

Democratic Community of Serbia (Serbian: Демократска заједница Србије, romanized: Demokratska zajednica Srbije, DZS) was a right-wing national conservative political party in Serbia which existed from 2006 when it split from the Democratic Party of Serbia until 2008 when it merged with the Serbian Radical Party.

The party was founded and led by Obren Joksimović, a former minister of health of Serbia.

The party took part in the 2007 Serbian parliamentary election winning only 0.13 percent of the popular vote (5,438 total votes). It was one of four parties that won less than 10,000 votes even after managing to submit the mandatory 10,000 signatures in order to be able to run in the election.
