= Milovan Bojić =

Serbian doctor, administrator, and politician

- Милован Бојић
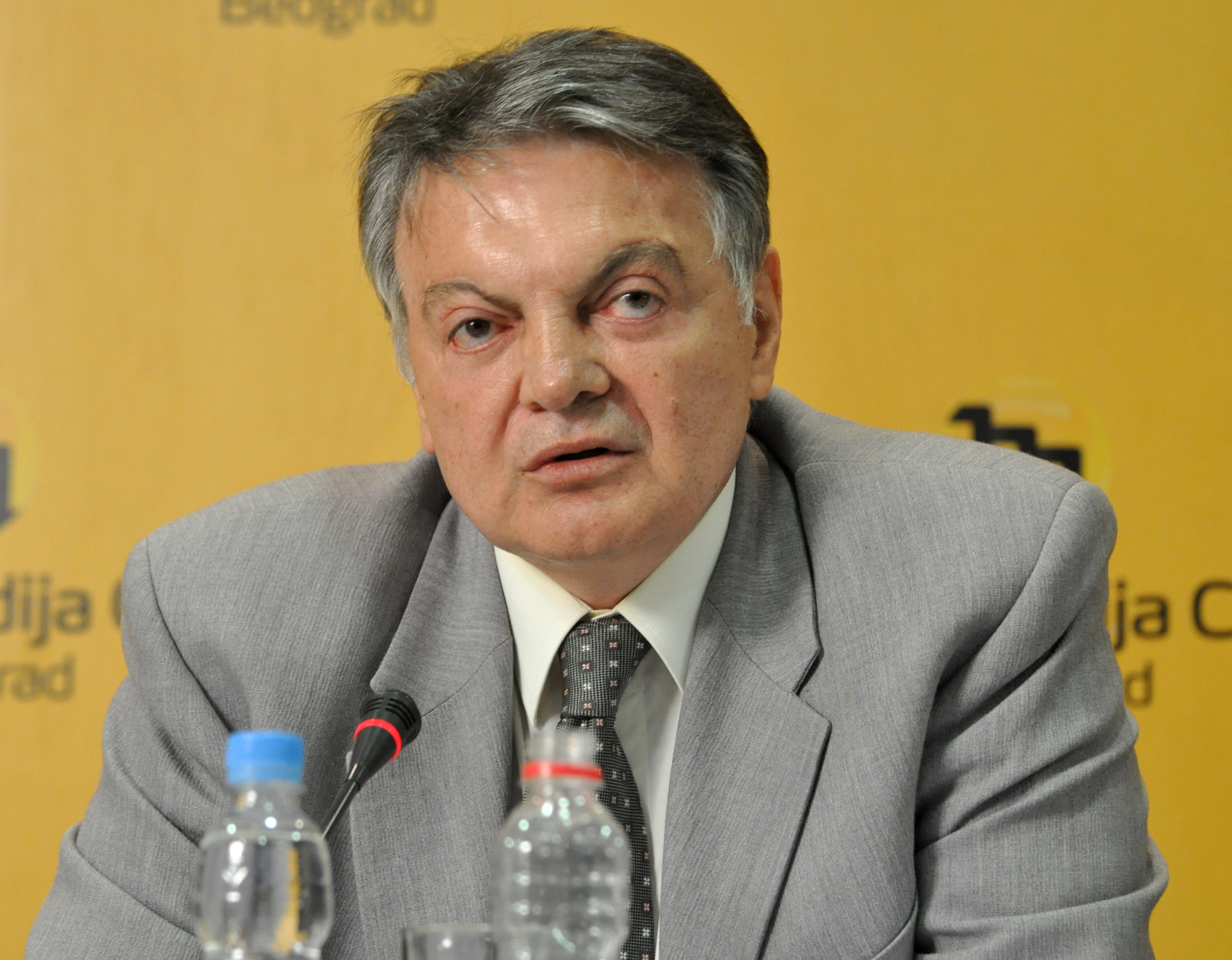

Minister of Health
- In office 13 July 2000 – 24 October 2000
- Prime Minister: Mirko Marjanović
- Preceded by: Leposava Milićević
- Succeeded by: Nada Kostić

Deputy Prime Minister of Serbia
- In office 24 March 1998 – 24 October 2000
- Prime Minister: Mirko Marjanović
- Preceded by: Vlajko Stojiljković
- Succeeded by: Spasoje Krunić; Nebojša Čović

Personal details
- Born: 13 March 1955 Kolašin, PR Montenegro, FPR Yugoslavia
- Party: SPS (1990–1994); JUL (1994–2003); SRS
- Education: University of Belgrade Faculty of Medicine
- Alma mater: University of Belgrade
- Occupation: Doctor, administrator, politician
- Profession: Doctor

Milovan Bojić (Serbian Cyrillic: Милован Бојић; born 13 March 1955) is a Serbian medical doctor, administrator, and politician.

At one time a high-ranking member of the Yugoslav Left party, Bojić served as a Deputy Prime Minister of Serbia from 1998 to 2000 and was also the country's Minister of Health in 2000. He resigned from office with the fall of Slobodan Milošević's government. He was re-elected to the National Assembly of Serbia in the 2016 Serbian parliamentary election for the far-right Serbian Radical Party and served until his resignation on 30 August 2017.

He is currently the director of the Dedinje Institute for Cardiovascular Diseases, a position he previously held from 1992 to 2000.

== Early life and private career ==
Bojić was born in a small village near Kolašin, in what was then the People's Republic of Montenegro in the Federal People's Republic of Yugoslavia. A gifted student with a strong interest in art and literature, he ultimately chose a career in medicine. He worked several menial jobs to pay for his enrollment at the University of Belgrade, where he eventually earned a Ph.D. After serving as an assistant professor at the University of Priština in Kosovo and Metohija, he returned to Belgrade and in 1992 was appointed as director of the Dedinje Institute for Cardiovascular Diseases, a position he held until October 2000.

Bojić pressed charges against the Montenegrin newspaper Dnevni telegraf in late 1998, after the paper published an article stating that a heart surgeon had been murdered after attempting to warn that "the director (i.e., Bojić) and other officials of the Dedinje surgical centre abused their positions to import medication and equipment." The presiding judge found in Bojić's favour, fining the paper 300,000 dinars and its editor-in-chief 150,000 dinars. A related decision in March 1999 saw the editor-in-chief and two journalists sentenced to five months in prison. The latter judgement was criticized by Amnesty International, which asserted that it was politically motivated. A police investigation concluded that Bojić was not linked to the murder referenced in the article.

== Political career ==
=== 1990–1994: Socialist Party member ===
Bojić joined Slobodan Milošević's Socialist Party of Serbia (SPS) in the early 1990s and became president of its municipal committee in the Belgrade neighbourhood of Vračar. He received the twelfth position on the party's electoral list for Belgrade in the 1992 Serbian parliamentary election. The party won fourteen seats in the city, though he was not afterwards selected as part of its parliamentary delegation. (From 1992 to 2000, Serbia's electoral law stipulated that one-third of parliamentary mandates would be assigned to candidates from successful lists in numerical order, while the remaining two-thirds would be distributed amongst other candidates at the discretion of the sponsoring parties. It was common practice for the latter mandates to be awarded out of numerical order, and Bojić's position on the list did not give him the automatic right to a seat in parliament.) He was not a candidate in the 1993 election.

=== 1994–2003: Yugoslav Left representative ===
Bojić left the Socialist Party in 1994 to join the newly formed and largely complementary Yugoslav Left party, led by Milošević's wife Mirjana Marković. He sought election to the Yugoslav parliament's Chamber of Citizens in the 1996 Yugoslavian election, running on the JUL's list in the Montenegrin division of Bijelo Polje. The JUL never developed a strong base of support in Montenegro, and the list did not win any seats in the division.

The JUL contested the 1997 Serbian parliamentary election in an alliance with the SPS and New Democracy. Bojić led the alliance's electoral list for the Voždovac division and was elected when the list won four mandates for the division. The alliance won the election, and Bojić served as a supporter of the government. He was also elected by the Serbian parliament as a delegate to the Yugoslav parliament's Chamber of Republics in 1998. Bojić welcomed the resignation of Radoje Kontić as prime minister of Yugoslavia in May 1998, arguing that it would strengthen the country's union.

Bojić was part of a Serbian government negotiating team that took part in what were ultimately unsuccessful negotiations with representatives of Albanian political parties in Kosovo throughout 1998. After one meeting in which the Albanian delegates failed to appear, Bojić remarked, "I would like the Albanian representatives to know that someone is trying to use them, they are not aware of the game they are being dragged into and they have nowhere to hide." He called for "an open dialogue without any preconditions" between the two sides.

In October 1998, Bojić was chosen as inaugural chair of the JUL's Committee of the University Left of Yugoslavia. The following month, a media report identified him as chair of the party directorate's social policy committee.

==== Deputy Prime Minister of Serbia (1998–2000) ====
Before the NATO bombing of Yugoslavia

On 24 March 1998, Bojić was sworn in as one of five deputy prime ministers of Serbia in a coalition government led by Mirko Marjanović. This administration had two deputy prime ministers each from the Socialist Party of Serbia and the Serbian Radical Party; Bojić was the sole JUL representative in the role.

Bojić asserted in June 1998 that the Kosovo Liberation Army (KLA) was perpetrating "terrorism" in Kosovo and that the government of Serbia was defending its territory and citizens via its conflict with the organization. He further asserted that the Serbian government was committed to defend the rights of national minorities, that the KLA was intent on the secession of Kosovo, and that "the Albanian separatist movement, in continuity, has in fact carried out the greatest ethnic cleansing and exodus of Serbs in the past one hundred years." He later welcomed the arrival of an Organization for Security and Cooperation in Europe mission in Kosovo, saying that it would confirm that there were no grounds for ethnic Albanian revolt.

As tensions increased in Kosovo throughout 1998, various western governments accused the Serbian state of conducting massacres against Albanians in the province, and some diplomats and politicians recommended air strikes against Serbia as a means of resolving the situation. Bojić responded by inviting international forensic experts into Kosovo to investigate all alleged massacres, including those against Serbs, and said he was confident that massacres were being staged by the KLA to provoke intervention from the North Atlantic Treaty Organization (NATO).

In October 1998, Bojić and Serbian information minister Aleksandar Vučić met with the editors-in-chief of Serbia's independent media organizations to order that they stop broadcasting international programs; Vučić advised the media representatives that an official ban would follow. The ministers added that this was a temporary measure due to "the threat of NATO intervention" in Kosovo. Serbia subsequently passed a restrictive law on public information; in response, the Council of the European Union banned Bojić and other Serbian politicians associated with the legislation from entering European Union member states.

In January 1999, Kosovo Verification Mission leader William Walker accused Serb forces of responsibility for the Račak massacre, an accusation that was ultimately a leading factor in NATO's decision to bomb Yugoslavia later in the year. Bojić responded that Walker's statement was aimed at provoking a military intervention against Serbs. In the same period, he rejected suggestions for an international conference on Kosovo and urged western powers to force Albanian delegates to form a united negotiating team "so we can finally sit down at a table like human beings and arrange to bring this sad drama to an end."

During the NATO bombing of Yugoslavia

Bojić delivered several public speeches condemning the NATO bombing of Yugoslavia, which lasted from 24 March – 10 June 1999. In one speech, at Lebane in southern Serbia, he asserted that Serbs had become more resolute in their desire to maintain Kosovo as an integral part of Serbia and called on Montenegrins to follow "the holy duty of defending the fatherland." He also stated, "We are also here today, at this magnificent rally, to send out a message to the new Adolf Hitler: death to fascists, death to invaders and Serbia will never surrender!" Bojić later joined other government officials to take part in human shield tactics to prevent NATO from bombing Belgrade's bridges. After a NATO bomb struck a hospital in Niš, Bojić described the attack as deliberate and charged NATO with genocidal aggression.

Following the NATO bombing of Yugoslavia

The NATO military campaign ended on 10 June 1999. Shortly after this time, many Kosovo Serbs fled the province fearing reprisals; Bojić urged them to return, saying, "Kosovo and Metohija belong to us - and will do so in the future only if we return there."

Several protests were held against Yugoslav President Slobodan Milošević following the NATO campaign, and Bojić, as a prominent ally of Milošević, was a frequent target of attacks. In September 1999, he sued leaders of the opposition Alliance for Change movement for libel following a public rally in which he was subjected to a "mock trial" and blamed for difficulties in Serbia's health system. In 2000, he filed similar charges against opposition political leader Zoran Đinđić.

Bojić was appointed to a second term Chamber of Republics in May 2000.

In May 2000, Bojić and fellow deputy prime minister Vojislav Šešelj signed a decree mandating the seizure of the opposition media outlet RTV Studio B by the Serbian state. Bojić and Šešelj asserted that the station was promoting terrorist activities and that it had repeatedly called for elected officials to be overthrown, charges that the studio's editor-in-chief dismissed as "nonsense." The takeover led to significant protests.

==== Minister of Health (2000) ====
Bojić received additional ministerial responsibilities as Serbia's minister of health on 12 July 2000. In this capacity, he banned smoking in all medical institutions and promoted the importation of medicines from China. In September 2000, he announced that no doctor would be permitted to work in state and private institutions at the same time. In the same period, the opposition Democratic Party accused Bojić of "persecuting" five doctors who were members of their party and who had criticized the country's health care situation at public meetings.

==== The Fall of Milošević and after ====
In July 2000, Bojić announced the JUL's support for a constitutional change that would permit Yugoslav President Slobodan Milošević to seek re-election. The change was approved, and a Yugoslavian general election was called for September 2020. The reforms to Yugoslavia's electoral system also saw the introduction of direct elections for the Chamber of Republics; the SPS and JUL ran a joint list of candidates for this body, and Bojić was included in the third position.

The 2000 Yugoslavian election saw the defeat of Slobodan Milošević by Democratic Opposition of Serbia candidate Vojislav Koštunica, an event that precipitated large-scale changes in Yugoslavian and Serbian politics. Notwithstanding Milošević's defeat, the SPS-JUL alliance won seven seats in the Chamber of Republics. Bojić was re-elected and served as an opposition member in the parliament that followed. He resigned as both health minister and deputy prime minister on 9 October 2000. (Technically, he remained in office until 24 October.) He was also dismissed as head of the Dedinje clinic in the same period. A newspaper report from this period described Bojić as "considered by many to be the most reviled of Milošević's supporters."

The Democratic Opposition of Serbia won a landslide majority in the December 2000 Serbian parliamentary election, and in May 2001 the ministry of the interior filed charges against Bojić for abuse of an official position. Charges could not move forward at the time, however, as Bojić still had parliamentary immunity by virtue of his seat in the Yugoslavian parliament. The DOS made various attempts to revoke Bojić's parliamentary immunity in 2001 and 2002, although these efforts were ultimately unsuccessful. The Chamber of Republics ceased to exist in 2003.

=== 2003–2016: Subsequent career ===
In 2003, the Supreme Court of Switzerland ruled that Swiss officials could provide Bojić's bank records to prosecutors in Serbia. In February 2005, by which time Bojić was no longer a parliamentarian, the Belgrade district prosecutor's office charged him with abuse of office. The charges were later withdrawn due to a lack of evidence. A new investigation was launched in 2011, and in April 2012 he was convicted of misusing his position at the Dedinje institute to embezzle more than 200,000 German marks. This decision was later overturned on appeal, and he was acquitted in a retrial.

In 2012, Bojić, acting in his capacity as a medical official, visited Radical Party leader Vojislav Šešelj at the International Criminal Tribunal for the Former Yugoslavia in The Hague and concluded that Šešelj's life was in danger due to health problems he was experiencing in captivity. In 2014, he urged that Šešelj be returned to Belgrade for treatment. After Šešelj was permitted to return to Belgrade on medical grounds, Bojić argued that forcing him to return to The Hague to face charges would be an act of murder, given Šešelj's ongoing cancer treatments. The matter ultimately became moot. The tribunal initially acquitted Šešelj in absentia of the charges against him. This acquittal was subsequently overturned and Šešelj was given a ten-year sentence for crimes against humanity, but he was not required to serve any of the sentence as he had already spent eleven years in pre-trial custody.

=== 2016–present: Radical Party representative and return to the Dedinje Institute ===
Bojić returned to political life in 2016, receiving the seventh position on the Radical Party's electoral list for that year's Serbian parliamentary election. He was elected when the list won twenty-two mandates. During the 2016 campaign, Šešelj said that Bojić had secretly joined the Radical Party in November 1998, when United Nations Protection Force representatives expelled Šešelj from the Republika Srpska after he, Bojić, and other Serbian politicians attended a public banquet for Nikola Poplašen. In Šešelj's recounting of events, Bojić (who left the Republika Srpska in the same convoy as Šešelj) made the decision to join the Radical Party during a late-night conversation in Bijeljina; Šešelj added that this was kept secret because of Bojić's high-profile position in the JUL.

Bojić's close co-operation with Radical Party colleagues during his time as a cabinet minister had previously been noted by some journalists. Bojić, for his part, said in August 1999 that the most meaningful division in Serbian politics was not between left- and right-wing parties, but between two rival blocs that he described as "patriotic" and "colonial."

Bojić served as an opposition deputy in 2016–17 and was a member of the parliamentary health and family committee, a deputy member of the environmental protection committee, a member of Serbia's delegation to the Parliamentary Assembly of the Council of Europe, and a member of the parliamentary friendship groups to Argentina and Cuba.

In March 2017, Bojić led a Radical Party parliamentary delegation to Crimea to mark the three-year anniversary of the area's de facto joining of the Russian Federation. He subsequently remarked that he planned to advise the Parliamentary Assembly of the Council of Europe that he was "greatly impressed by casual communication with residents of the (resort city of) Yalta. [...] All of them are satisfied, no one oppresses them." He added that he believed the 2014 Crimean status referendum was held in accordance with international law. The government of Ukraine, which considers Crimea to be a part of its territory, responded by issuing a five-year travel ban to Bojić and other members of the delegation. Two months later, Bojić took part in a Radical Party delegation to the breakaway Donetsk People's Republic.

Bojić resigned from the assembly on 30 August 2017, citing a need to return to the medical profession. The following month, he was re-appointed by the government of Serbia as director of the Dedinje Institute. The journal Blic later reported that the appointment was the result of extensive lobbying by Šešelj to the Serbian government.

In August 2018, Bojić received a permit to begin construction of a new, modern hospital for the treatment of cardiovascular diseases, to be called "Dedinje 2."
