= Vlajko Stojiljković =

Serbian politician

- Влајко Стојиљковић
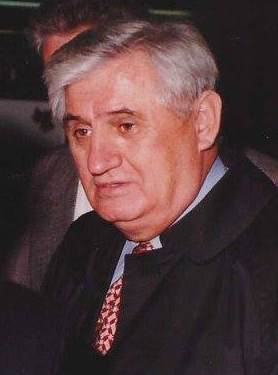

Minister of Internal Affairs
- In office 15 April 1997 – 11 October 2000
- Prime Minister: Mirko Marjanović
- Preceded by: Vlastimir Đorđević (acting)
- Succeeded by: Slobodan Tomović; Božidar Prelević; Stevan Nikčević (as co-ministers)

Deputy Prime Minister of Serbia
- In office 15 April 1997 – 24 March 1998
- Prime Minister: Mirko Marjanović
- Preceded by: Nedeljko Šipovac
- Succeeded by: Milovan Bojić

Personal details
- Born: 13 March 1937 Mala Krsna, Kingdom of Yugoslavia
- Died: 13 April 2002 (aged 65) Belgrade, FR Yugoslavia
- Party: League of Communists of Yugoslavia (until 1990); Socialist Party of Serbia (1990–2002)
- Education: University of Belgrade Faculty of Law
- Alma mater: University of Belgrade
- Occupation: Politician
- Profession: Lawyer

Vlajko Stojiljković (Serbian Cyrillic: Влајко Стојиљковић; 13 March 1937 – 13 April 2002) was a Serbian politician. He served as the Minister of Internal Affairs in the Government of Serbia from 1997 to 2000. He also served as the Deputy Prime Minister of Serbia from 1997 to 1998. He was a member of the League of Communists of Yugoslavia and the Socialist Party of Serbia from its founding until his death in 2002.

On 24 May 1999, he was accused with crimes against humanity and violations of the laws or customs of war.

== Death ==
On 11 April 2002, the day the Law on Cooperation with the Hague Tribunal was passed, he shot himself on the steps of the House of the National Assembly of Serbia in Belgrade.

In his farewell letter given to the Serbian Radical Party MP Filip Stojanović and read by Aleksandar Vučić in front of the media, he stated that he's: "protesting against the members of the puppet regime of the Democratic Opposition of Serbia ... because of the destruction of state with the participation of the biggest enemy of our people Javier Solana, the wanton extermination of the Constitution and laws of this country, the policy of treason and capitulation, the loss of national dignity, the destruction of the economy and the bringing of millions of citizens into the social misery..."

His advocate at the time Branimir Gugl stated: "Stojiljković's suicide is the first and most drastic consequence of the adoption of the Law on Cooperation with the Hague Tribunal." Stojiljković died, two days later, on 13 April 2002.

His son, Vladimir, committed suicide in 2004.

== See also ==
- War crimes in the Kosovo War
- Operation Horseshoe

Government offices
Preceded by Nedeljko Šipovac	Deputy Prime Minister of Serbia; 1997–1998	Succeeded by Milovan Bojić
Preceded by Vlastimir Đorđević (acting)	Minister of Internal Affairs of Serbia; 1997–2000	Succeeded by Slobodan Tomović; Božidar Prelević; Stevan Nikčević (as co-ministers)
