= Bulbušići =

Bulbulušići Bulbulušići
- Village
- Location within Bosnia and Herzegovina
- Coordinates: 44°05′24″N 18°15′36″E
- Country: Bosnia and Herzegovina
- Entity: Federation of Bosnia and Herzegovina
- Canton: Zenica-Doboj
- Municipality: Breza

Area
  - Total: 0.15 sq mi (0.38 km^{2})

Population (2013)
  - Total: 487
  - Density: 3,300/sq mi (1,300/km^{2})
- Time zone: UTC+1 (CET)
  - Summer (DST): UTC+2 (CEST)

Bulbušići (Serbian: Балбушићи) is a village in the municipality of Breza, Bosnia and Herzegovina.

== Demographics ==
According to the 2013 census, its population was 487.

Ethnicity in 2013
Ethnicity	Number	Percentage
Bosniaks	455	93.4%
Croats	3	0.6%
Serbs	1	0.2%
other/undeclared	28	5.7%
Total	487	100%
