= Bukovik (Breza) =

Bukovik Буковик
- Village
- Location within Bosnia and Herzegovina
- Coordinates: 44°03′53″N 18°14′12″E
- Country: Bosnia and Herzegovina
- Entity: Federation of Bosnia and Herzegovina
- Canton: Zenica-Doboj
- Municipality: Breza

Area
  - Total: 1.14 sq mi (2.94 km^{2})

Population (2013)
  - Total: 651
  - Density: 573/sq mi (221/km^{2})
- Time zone: UTC+1 (CET)
  - Summer (DST): UTC+2 (CEST)

Bukovik (Serbian: Буковик) is a village in the municipality of Breza, Bosnia and Herzegovina.

== Demographics ==
According to the 2013 census, its population was 651.

Ethnicity in 2013
Ethnicity	Number	Percentage
Bosniaks	632	97.1%
other/undeclared	19	2.9%
Total	651	100%
