= Orahovo (Breza) =

- Village
- Location within Bosnia and Herzegovina
- Coordinates: 44°02′44″N 18°20′42″E
- Country: Bosnia and Herzegovina
- Entity: Federation of Bosnia and Herzegovina
- Canton: Zenica-Doboj
- Municipality: Breza

Area
  - Total: 1.63 sq mi (4.21 km^{2})

Population (2013)
  - Total: 73
  - Density: 45/sq mi (17/km^{2})
- Time zone: UTC+1 (CET)
  - Summer (DST): UTC+2 (CEST)

Orahovo is a village in the municipality of Breza, Bosnia and Herzegovina.

== Demographics ==
According to the 2013 census, its population was 73, all Bosniaks.
