= Arif Heralić =

Bosnian Muslim metal worker

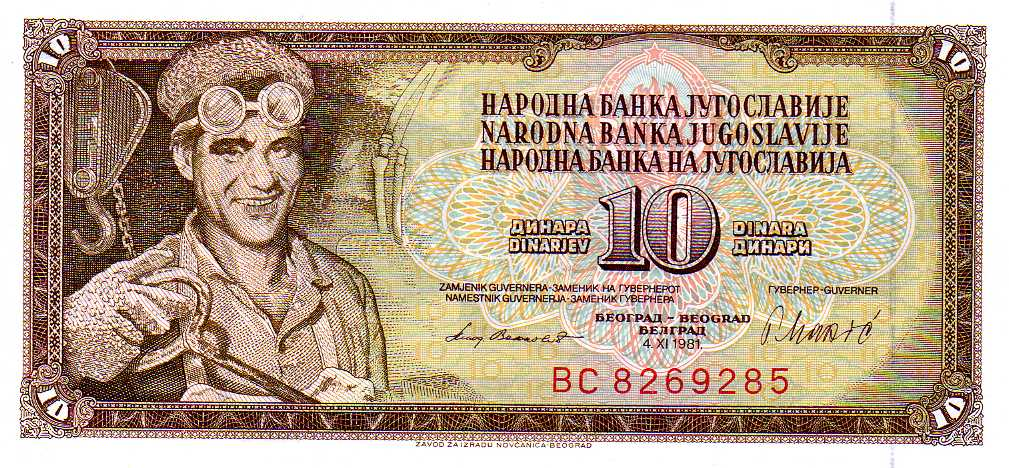
- Arif Heralić on the 10 dinara banknote.
- Born: 5 May 1922; Zenica, Kingdom of Yugoslavia
- Died: 17 June 1971 (aged 49); Zenica, SR Bosnia and Herzegovina, Yugoslavia
- Occupation: blast furnace worker
- Known for: Being on a banknote

Arif Heralić (5 May 1922 – 17 June 1971) was a Bosnian Muslim metal worker on a blast furnace in Zenica. He had 11 children and issues with alcoholism and mental illness. As a disabled worker, Heralić died in extreme poverty in 1971.

== Banknote, iconography and legacy ==
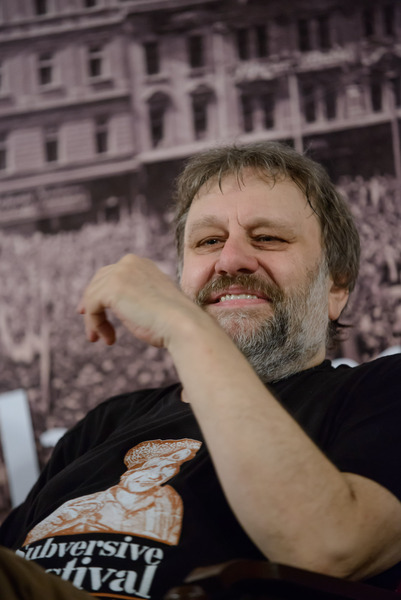
Heralić on an official 2013 Subversive Festival T-shirt, worn here by Slavoj Žižek

His picture was taken by Nikola Bibić, a Borba news photographer, in 1954 and from the papers he came to feature on a 1,000 Yugoslav dinar banknote issued from 1955 to 1981, re-nominated to ten new dinars since 1965. He is still popular as an icon of industrial workers in the area of former Yugoslavia.

The banknote is not to be confused with the 20,000 dinar banknote, which depicts Alija Sirotanović.

The plot of the 2015 movie, Hiljadarka, is inspired by Heralić's life.

== See also ==
- Alija Sirotanović, model for a 20,000 dinara banknote
