= Slivno, Šibenik-Knin County =

Settlement in Šibenik-Knin County, Croatia

Slivno
- Settlement
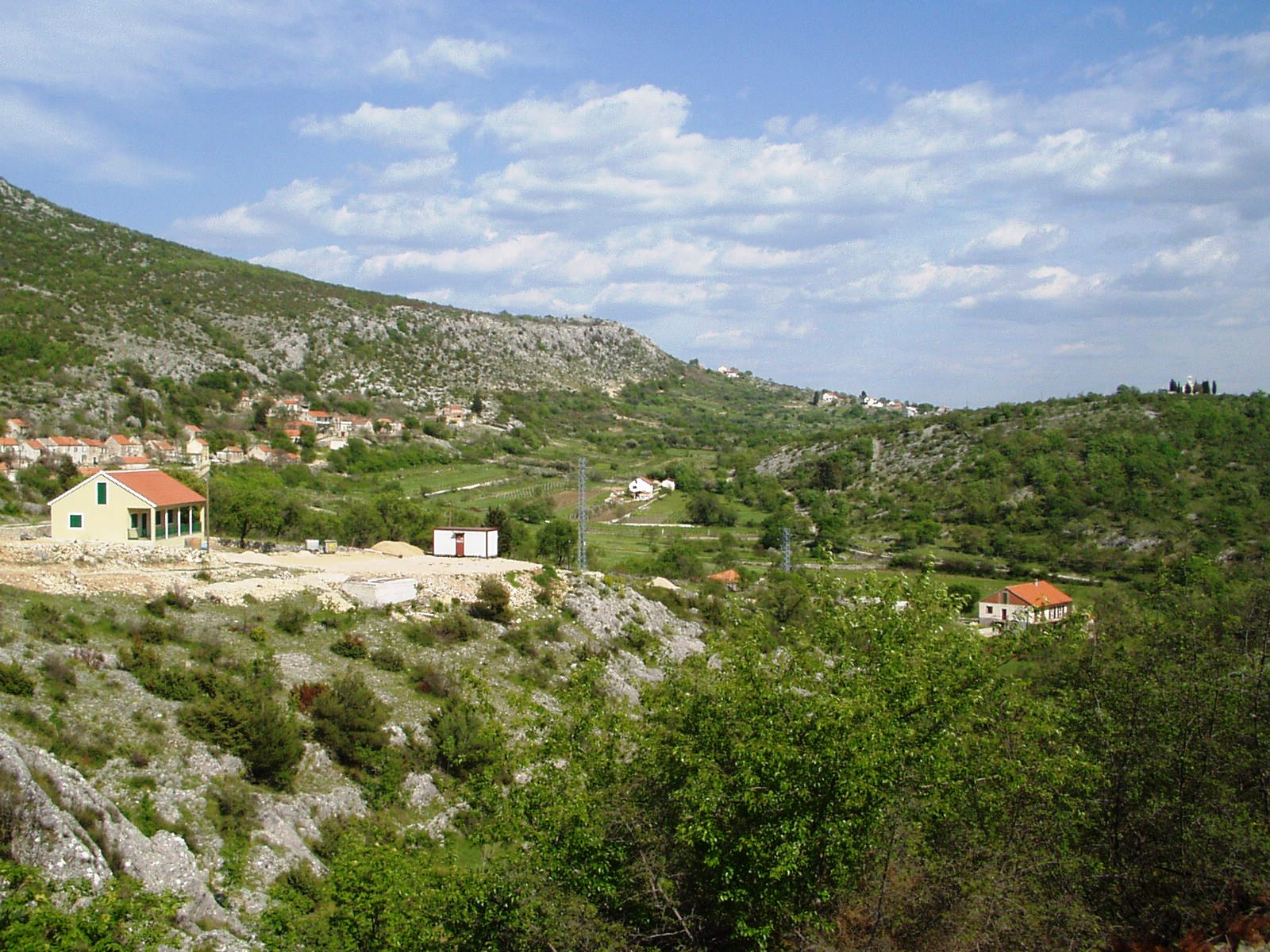
- Interactive map of Slivno
- Location of Slivno in Croatia
- Coordinates: 43°40′48″N 16°06′18″E
- Country: Croatia
- County: Šibenik-Knin
- City: Šibenik

Area
  - Total: 10.7 km^{2} (4.1 sq mi)

Population (2021)
  - Total: 95
  - Density: 8.9/km^{2} (23/sq mi)
- Time zone: UTC+1 (CET)
  - Summer (DST): UTC+2 (CEST)
- Postal code: 22000 Šibenik
- Area code: +385 (0)22

Slivno is a settlement in the City of Šibenik in Croatia. In 2021, its population was 95.

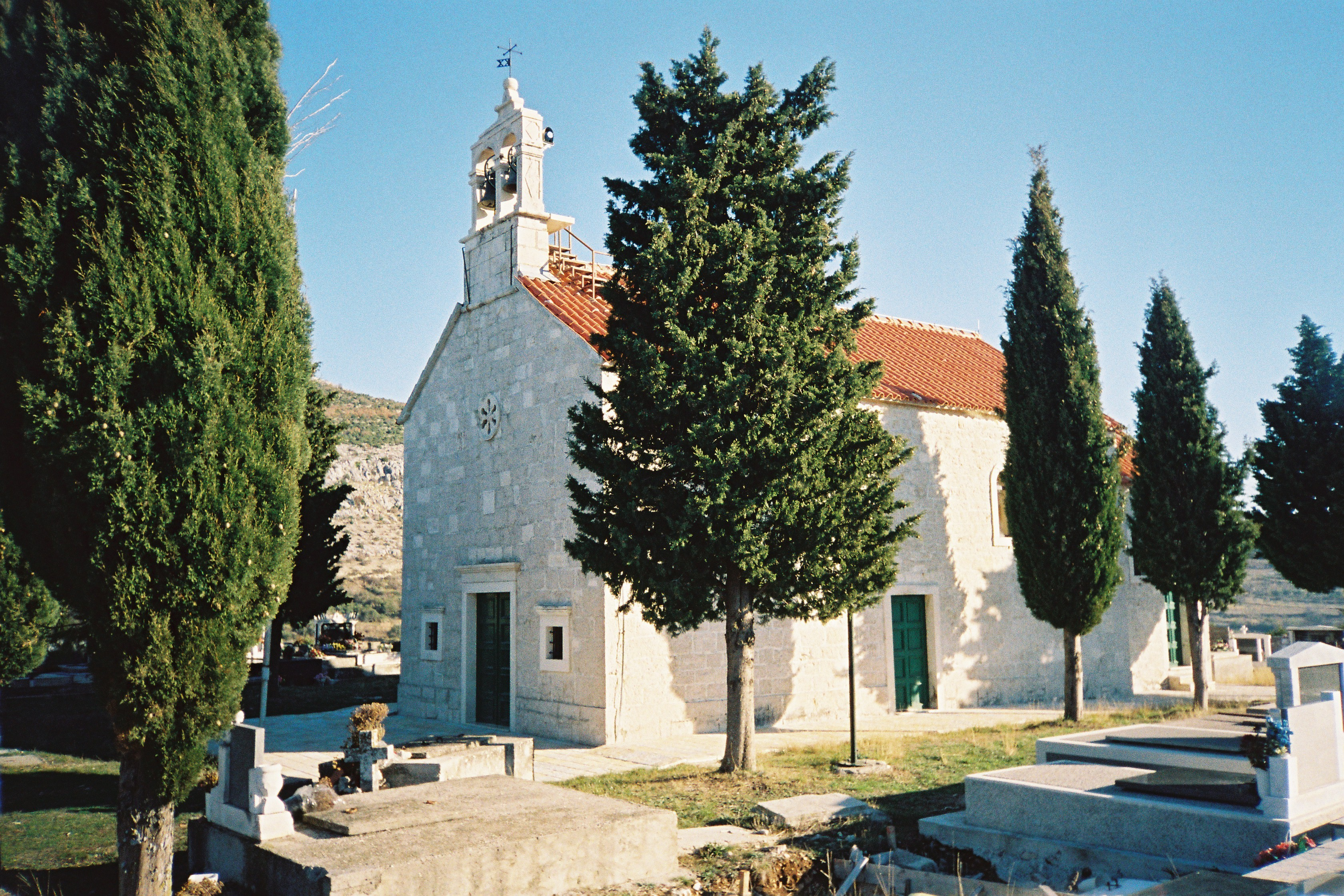
St. John's church in Slivno

== Demographics ==
Slivno: Population trends 1857–2021
v

population	338	348	278	314	342	432	539	502	521	535	510	370	294	180	126	110	95
	1857	1869	1880	1890	1900	1910	1921	1931	1948	1953	1961	1971	1981	1991	2001	2011	2021

Sources: Croatian Bureau of Statistics publications
