= Trtorići =

- Village
- Location within Bosnia and Herzegovina
- Coordinates: 44°02′N 18°18′E
- Country: Bosnia and Herzegovina
- Entity: Federation of Bosnia and Herzegovina
- Canton: Zenica-Doboj
- Municipality: Breza

Area
  - Total: 1.47 sq mi (3.81 km^{2})

Population (2013)
  - Total: 202
  - Density: 137/sq mi (53.0/km^{2})
- Time zone: UTC+1 (CET)
  - Summer (DST): UTC+2 (CEST)

Trtorići is a village in the municipality of Breza, Bosnia and Herzegovina.

== Demographics ==
According to the 2013 census, its population was 202.

Ethnicity in 2013
Ethnicity	Number	Percentage
Bosniaks	200	99.0%
other/undeclared	2	1.0%
Total	202	100%
