= Smrekovica, Bosnia and Herzegovina =

Smrekovica Смрековица
- Village
- Location within Bosnia and Herzegovina
- Coordinates: 44°02′N 18°15′E
- Country: Bosnia and Herzegovina
- Entity: Federation of Bosnia and Herzegovina
- Canton: Zenica-Doboj
- Municipality: Breza

Area
  - Total: 1.08 sq mi (2.79 km^{2})

Population (2013)
  - Total: 440
  - Density: 410/sq mi (160/km^{2})
- Time zone: UTC+1 (CET)
  - Summer (DST): UTC+2 (CEST)

Smrekovica (Cyrillic: Смрековица) is a village in the municipality of Breza, Bosnia and Herzegovina.

== Demographics ==
According to the 2013 census, its population was 440.

Ethnicity in 2013
Ethnicity	Number	Percentage
Bosniaks	409	93.0%
Croats	10	2.3%
Serbs	6	1.4%
other/undeclared	15	3.4%
Total	440	100%
