= Slivno, Bosnia and Herzegovina =

Slivno
- Village
- Location within Bosnia and Herzegovina
- Coordinates: 44.028°N 18.322°E
- Country: Bosnia and Herzegovina
- Entity: Federation of Bosnia and Herzegovina
- Canton: Zenica-Doboj
- Municipality: Breza

Area
  - Total: 1.87 sq mi (4.85 km^{2})

Population (2013)
  - Total: 243
  - Density: 130/sq mi (50.1/km^{2})
- Time zone: UTC+1 (CET)
  - Summer (DST): UTC+2 (CEST)

Slivno is a village in the municipality of Breza, Bosnia and Herzegovina.

== Demographics ==
According to the 2013 census, its population was 243.

Ethnicity in 2013
Ethnicity	Number	Percentage
Bosniaks	242	99.6%
other/undeclared	1	0.4%
Total	243	100%
