= Koritnik, Ivanjica =

Koritnik
- Village
- Location within Serbia
- Coordinates: 43°22′19″N 20°24′33″E
- Country: Serbia
- District: Moravica District
- Municipality: Ivanjica

Area
  - Total: 59.87 km^{2} (23.12 sq mi)
- Elevation: 1,155 m (3,789 ft)

Population (2011)
  - Total: 394
  - Density: 6.58/km^{2} (17.0/sq mi)
- Time zone: UTC+1 (CET)
  - Summer (DST): UTC+2 (CEST)

Koritnik is a village in the municipality of Ivanjica, Serbia. According to the 2011 census, the village has a population of 394 inhabitants.

== Population ==
Population of Koritnik
1948	1953	1961	1971	1981	1991	2002	2011
755	831	996	931	722	535	424	394
