= Koritnik (Breza) =

Koritnik Коритник
- Village
- Location within Bosnia and Herzegovina
- Coordinates: 44°00′53″N 18°17′02″E
- Country: Bosnia and Herzegovina
- Entity: Federation of Bosnia and Herzegovina
- Canton: Zenica-Doboj
- Municipality: Breza

Area
  - Total: 0.68 sq mi (1.75 km^{2})

Population (2013)
  - Total: 781
  - Density: 1,160/sq mi (446/km^{2})
- Time zone: UTC+1 (CET)
  - Summer (DST): UTC+2 (CEST)

Koritnik (Serbian: Коритник) is a village in the municipality of Breza, Bosnia and Herzegovina.

== Climate ==
Koritnik has hot summers and cold winters with areas of higher elevation having short, cool summers and long, severe winters.

== Demographics ==
According to the 2013 census, its population was 781.

Ethnicity in 2013
Ethnicity	Number	Percentage
Bosniaks	762	97.6%
Croats	2	0.3%
other/undeclared	17	2.2%
Total	781	100%
