= Breza, Bosnia and Herzegovina =

Breza Бреза
- Town and municipality
- Seal

- Location of Breza within Bosnia and Herzegovina.
- Coordinates: 44°01′00″N 18°15′40″E
- Country: Bosnia and Herzegovina
- Entity: Federation of Bosnia and Herzegovina
- Canton: Zenica-Doboj

Government
  - Municipal mayor: Vedad Jusić (SDA)

Area
  - Town and municipality: 729 km^{2} (281 sq mi)

Population (2013 census)
  - Town and municipality: 14,168
  - Density: 200/km^{2} (520/sq mi)
  - Urban: 3,014
- Time zone: UTC+1 (CET)
  - Summer (DST): UTC+2 (CEST)
- Area code: 032
- Website: breza.gov.ba

Breza (Serbian Cyrillic: Бреза) is a town and municipality located in Zenica-Doboj Canton of the Federation of Bosnia and Herzegovina, an entity of Bosnia and Herzegovina. It is situated in central Bosnia and Herzegovina, and is famous for mining and production of coal. It covers an area of 73 km^{2} (28 sq mi).

== History ==
Breza as a settlement was first time mentioned in documents dating from the 2nd century as Hedum Kastelum (Inhabited Castle). The ancient town was the capital of the infamous Daesitiates, an Ilyrian tribe which had most of the territory of modern central Bosnia under control before being crushed by the Romans.

== Geography ==
According to the 2013 census, the municipality has a population of 14,168 inhabitants.

== Education ==
The municipality has three primary schools and two secondary schools, one of which is a gymnasium and the other one is a technical/vocational school.

== Sport ==
Breza is famous for having one of the oldest clubs formed in Bosnia and Herzegovina; the football club Rudar was formed in 1924. The town is also famous for many local volleyball and basketball clubs.

== Villages in the municipality of Breza ==
- Banjevac
- Breza
- Bukovik
- Bulbušići
- Gornja Breza
- Izbod
- Kamenice
- Koritnik
- Mahala
- Mahmutovića Rijeka
- Nasići
- Očevlje
- Orahovo
- Podgora
- Potkraj
- Prhinje
- Seoce
- Slivno
- Smailbegovići
- Smrekovica
- Sutješćica
- Trtorići
- Vardište
- Vijesolići
- Vlahinje
- Vrbovik
- Založje
- Župča

== Demographics ==
=== 1971 ===
In the 1971 census:

| Ethnicity | Population | % |
|---|---|---|
| Muslims | 10,659 | 71.90% |
| Serbs | 2,333 | 15.73% |
| Croats | 1,446 | 9.75% |
| Yugoslavs | 225 | 1.51% |
| Others | 161 | 1.11% |
| Total: | 14,824 | 100% |

=== 1991 ===
In the 1991 census, the municipality of Breza had 17,317 residents:

| Ethnicity | Population | % |
|---|---|---|
| Muslims | 13,079 | 75.52% |
| Serbs | 2,122 | 12.25% |
| Croats | 851 | 4.91% |
| Others | 1,265 | 7.32% |
| Total: | 17,317 | 100% |

=== 2013 ===
In the 2013 census, the municipality of Breza had 14,168 residents:

| Ethnicity | Population | % |
|---|---|---|
| Bosniaks | 13,154 | 92.8% |
| Croats | 314 | 2.2% |
| Serbs | 121 | 0.9% |
| Others | 579 | 4.1% |
| Total: | 14,168 | 100% |

In the 2013 census, the town of Breza had 3,014 residents:

| Ethnicity | Population | % |
|---|---|---|
| Bosniaks | 2,354 | 78.1% |
| Croats | 258 | 8.6% |
| Serbs | 89 | 3% |
| Others | 313 | 10.4% |
| Total: | 3,014 | 100% |

== Notable people ==
- Haris Silajdžić, politician
- Alija Sirotanović, miner
- Munib Bisić, politician
