= 2013 Serbian local elections =

A small number of municipalities in Serbia held local elections in 2013. These were not part of Serbia's regular cycle of local elections but took place in jurisdictions where either the local government had fallen or the last local elections for four-year terms had taken place in 2009.

All local elections in 2013 were held under a system of proportional representation. Mayors were not directly elected but were instead chosen by elected members of the local assemblies. Parties were required to cross a five per cent electoral threshold (of all votes, not only of valid votes), although this requirement was waived for parties representing national minority communities.

== Results ==
=== Belgrade ===
==== Voždovac ====
An election was held in Voždovac on 15 December 2013 due to the expiry of the term of the previous assembly elected in2009.

Party	Votes	%	Seats
"Aleksandar Vučić–Serbian Progressive Party"	28,258	53.23	36
"Đilas Democratic"	6,140	11.57	7
"Ivica Dačić–Socialist Party of Serbia (SPS)–Party of United Pensioners of Serbia (PUPS)–United Serbia (JS)"	4,334	8.16	5
"Democratic Party of Serbia–Vojislav Koštunica"	3,216	6.06	4
"Rasim Ljajić–Social Democratic Party of Serbia"	3,126	5.89	3
"Čedomir Jovanović–Liberal Democratic Party"	2,290	4.31	–
"Dveri–New Power of Voždovac, Serbian Movement Oathkeepers, Serbian Krajina, Movement of Veterans of Serbia, Movement for Serbia, Citizens' Association: Free Serbia – Čačak, Movement: Women Creators for Serbia, National Consciousness–Branimir Nešić"	1,881	3.54	–
"1389–Fight for Voždovac–Miša Vacić"	952	1.79	–
"Serbian Radical Party–Dr. Vojislav Šešelj"	911	1.72	–
"New Party–Zoran Živković"	793	1.49	–
"Belgrade Initiative–Zoran Ostojić–URS–Miroslav Čučković"	601	1.13	–
"None of the Above" list	536	1.01	–
"European Democracy" list	53	0.10	–
Total	53,091	100.00	55
Valid votes	53,091	97.21	
Invalid/blank votes	1,526	2.79	
Total votes	54,617	100.00	
Registered voters/turnout	156,962	34.80	

Aleksandar Savić of the Progressive Party was chosen as mayor after the election.

==== Zemun ====
An election was held in Zemun on 2 June 2013 due to the expiry of the term of the previous assembly elected in 2009.

Party	Votes	%	Seats
"Serbian Progressive Party–Aleksandar Vučić (Serbian Progressive Party–SNS, New Serbia–NS, Movement of Socialists–PS)"	29,071	53.22	39
"Ivica Dačić–Socialist Party of Serbia (SPS)–Party of United Pensioners of Serbia (PUPS)–United Serbia (JS)–Social Democratic Party of Serbia (SDPS)–Movement of Veterans (PV)"	6,473	11.85	8
"Democratic Party–Sava Jerković"	5,016	9.18	6
"Democratic Party of Serbia–Dveri–Vojislav Koštunica"	3,727	6.82	4
"Serbian Radical Party–Dr. Vojislav Šešelj"	2,369	4.34	–
"Liberal Democratic Party–Čedomir Jovanović"	2,354	4.31	–
"Zemun Movement–Movement of Workers and Peasants, Prof. Miša Krstić"	1,312	2.40	–
Citizens' Group list: "For Zemun–Batajnica Development Movement"	803	1.47	–
"Zemun Story–Our Cause–Third Serbia"	800	1.46	–
"My City of Zemun–Milan Nadoveza Naja" list	766	1.40	–
"Socialdemocratic Alliance–Prof. Dr. Danica Grujičić" list	646	1.18	–
"Zemun Our City–Zemun Citizens' Movement–United Regions of Serbia–Serbian Renewal Movement"	550	1.01	–
"Citizens' Alternative–Dr. Goran Mandić" list	446	0.82	–
"SNP 1389–Serbian Zemun–Miša Vacić"	294	0.54	–
Total	54,627	100.00	57
Valid votes	54,627	97.38	
Invalid/blank votes	1,467	2.62	
Total votes	56,094	100.00	
Registered voters/turnout	160,036	35.05	

Dejan Matić of the Progressive Party was selected as mayor after the election. Aleksandar Šešelj, the son of Radical Party leader Vojislav Šešelj, appeared in the fifth position on the Radical list.

=== Vojvodina ===
==== Kovin ====
An election was held in Kovin on 7 April 2013, due to the expiry of the term of the previous assembly elected in 2009.

Party	Votes	%	Seats
Serbian Progressive Party–Aleksandar Vučić	6,910	44.07	24
Sava Krstić–Movement for Revival-United Regions of Serbia	2,272	14.49	8
Ivica Dačić–Socialist Party of Serbia (SPS), United Serbia (JS), Social Democratic Party of Serbia (SDPS)	1,920	12.24	6
For a Better Kovin–Dr. Bojan Pajtić (Democratic Party)	1,473	9.39	5
Alliance of Vojvodina Hungarians–István Pásztor	798	5.09	2
PUPS Dr. Jovan Krkobabić	749	4.78	–
League of Social Democrats of Vojvodina–Nenad Čanak	574	3.66	–
Democratic Party of Serbia	459	2.93	–
Citizens' Group: New List–Željko Nikolić Gosa	323	2.06	–
Serbian Radical Party–Dr. Vojislav Šešelj	202	1.29	–
Total	15,680	100.00	45
Valid votes	15,680	96.23	
Invalid/blank votes	614	3.77	
Total votes	16,294	100.00	
Registered voters/turnout	29,524	55.19	

Gordana Zorić of the Serbian Progressive Party was chosen as mayor after the election. She resigned the office in June 2014 after being elected to the National Assembly of Serbia, and fellow Progressive Party member Dušan Petrović was appointed as her successor. Petrović was in turn expelled from the Progressives in August 2014, in February 2015 he was replaced as mayor by Sanja Petrović, also of the Progressive Party.

In June 2015, shifting political alliances brought to power a new coalition administration that included the Socialist Party of Serbia, the Democratic Party, the Alliance of Vojvodina Hungarians, and former members of the Progressives. Socialist delegate Zoran Nikolić was chosen as mayor. His administration lasted until September 2015, when the Progressives returned to power with Sanja Petrović once again in the mayor's office. She served for the remainder of the term.

==== Odžaci ====
An election was held in Odžaci on 15 December 2013, at what was effectively the expiry of the term of the previous assembly elected in January 2010.

Party	Votes	%	Seats
"Aleksandar Vučić–Serbian Progressive Party (Serbian Progressive Party, Movement of Socialists, People's Movement Dinara-Drina-Danube, Serbian Renewal Movement, Social Democratic Party of Serbia, Party of Vojvodina Slovaks)"	8,357	48.17	16
"Democratic Party–Dr. Bojan Pajtić"	2,973	17.14	5
"Ivica Dačić–Socialist Party of Serbia (SPS)–Party of United Pensioners of Serbia (PUPS)–United Serbia (JS)–Slovak Party–Krajišnik Association"	2,119	12.21	4
"Serb Democratic Party–Gligorijević Dragan - Puke"	1,359	7.83	2
"Patriotic Blok (DSS–Dveri–Srpska Krajina")–Dr. Vojislav Koštunica"	805	4.64	–
"Serbian Radical Party–Dr. Vojislav Šešelj"	581	3.35	–
Alliance of Vojvodina Hungarians–István Pásztor"	415	2.39	–
Citizens' Group list: "Earth - Our Security Goran Stamenković"	391	2.25	–
"Čedomir Jovanović–Liberal Democratic Party"	184	1.06	–
"United Regions of Serbia–Mlađan Dinkić"	164	0.95	–
Total	17,348	100.00	27
Valid votes	17,348	97.82	
Invalid/blank votes	387	2.18	
Total votes	17,735	100.00	
Registered voters/turnout	26,966	65.77	

Dušan Marijan of the Progressive Party was chosen as mayor when the new assembly convened in January 2014.

==== Vrbas ====
An election was held in Vrbas on 13 October 2013 due to the expiry of the term of the previous assembly elected in 2009.

Party	Votes	%	Seats
"Aleksandar Vučić–Serbian Progressive Party (Serbian Progressive Party, New Serbia, Movement of Socialists, Social Democratic Party of Serbia, Serbian Renewal Movement, Rusyn Democratic Party)"	8,958	40.24	18
"Ivica Dačić–Socialist Party of Serbia (SPS)–Party of United Pensioners of Serbia (PUPS)–United Serbia (JS)–Alliance of Vojvodina Hungarians (SVM)–Krajišnik Association"	5,400	24.26	10
"Democratic Party–Dr. Bojan Pajtić"	4,065	18.26	8
"Serbian Radical Party–Dr. Vojislav Šešelj"	993	4.46	–
Citizens' Group list: "SVI Together–Socialdemocratic Alliance–Branislav Petrović"	883	3.97	–
"Liberal Democratic Party–League of Social Democrats of Vojvodina"	773	3.47	–
"Dveri–For the Life of Vrbas–Ivan B. Kostić"	596	2.68	–
"Democratic Party of Serbia–Vrbas Youth Association–Dr. Vojislav Koštunica"	594	2.67	–
Total	22,262	100.00	36
Valid votes	22,262	95.75	
Invalid/blank votes	988	4.25	
Total votes	23,250	100.00	
Registered voters/turnout	36,804	63.17	

Bratislav Kažić of the Progressive Party was selected as mayor after the election. Milan Glušac, also of the Progressives, was chosen as deputy mayor. Kažić resigned as mayor in July 2016 and was succeeded by Glušac. Glušac, in turn, resigned as mayor in January 2017 to prompt a new local election ahead of schedule (coinciding with the 2017 Serbian presidential election) and was appointed as leader of a provisional authority that governed the municipality in advance of the vote.

Future parliamentarian Ivan Kostić appeared in the lead position on Dveri's list.

=== Šumadija and Western Serbia ===
==== Kosjerić ====
A local election was held in Kosjerić on 26 May 2013, due to the expiry of the term of the previous assembly elected in 2009.

Party	Votes	%	Seats
For a Better Kosjerić–Milijan Stojanić–Serbian Progressive Party, New Serbia, and Democratic Party of Serbia	3,332	48.39	15
Democratic Party–Liberal Democratic Party–Responsibly	1,243	18.05	5
Determined for Kosjerić–"Ivica Dačić Socialist Party of Serbia (SPS), Party of United Pensioners of Serbia (PUPS)–Jovan Krkobabić, United Serbia (JS)–Dragan Marković Palma, United Regions of Serbia–Mlađan Dinkić	814	11.82	3
"Dr. Ljiljana Kosorić–SPO"	590	8.57	2
Mlađen Marković–Social Democratic Party of Serbia"	450	6.53	2
Dveri for the life of Kosjerić–Boško Obradović	258	3.75	–
Citizen's Group: Assembly of Serbian Unity "Borislav Pelević"	199	2.89	–
Total	6,886	100.00	27
Valid votes	6,886	97.45	
Invalid/blank votes	180	2.55	
Total votes	7,066	100.00	
Registered voters/turnout	10,268	68.82	

Incumbent mayor Milijan Stojanić of the Serbian Progressive Party was confirmed for another term in office after the election.
