= Vacić =

Vacić is a surname. Notable people with the surname include:

- Miša Vacić (born 1985), Serbian politician
- Nataša Mihailović Vacić (born 1972), Serbian journalist
