= Nož, žica, Srebrenica =

Islamophobic ultranationalist anti-Bosniak hate slogan

Nož, žica, Srebrenica (Serbian Cyrillic: Нож, жица, Сребреница, lit. 'Knife, wire, Srebrenica') is a Serbian chauvinist hate slogan that glorifies the Srebrenica massacre of Bosniaks during the Bosnian War. The slogan rhymes in Serbo-Croatian and can be heard at football matches, by members of Serbian nationalist groups Obraz, the 1389 Movement and the Serbian Radical Party and in papers in support of Bosnian Serb General Ratko Mladić.

Occasionally "Biće repriza!" (There Will Be a Repeat!) is added to the slogan, celebrating the killings and threatening a future massacre.

== Background ==
More than 8,000 men and boys under UN military protection were murdered in the vicinity of Srebrenica in 1995 by the Army of Republika Srpska. The Srebrenica massacre has been denied by many Serbs, including Milorad Dodik, the Serb member of the Presidency of Bosnia and Herzegovina.

== Incidents ==
To commemorate the tenth anniversary of the massacre in 2005, 28 billboards were set up around Belgrade. Unknown perpetrators vandalized 24 of the billboards, with "Nož, žica, Srebrenica" being spray-painted in addition to other terms. The "barbed wire" part of the chant refers to the fact that the hands of a number of Muslim victims were tied with wire prior to their execution.

On 10 July 2005, members of the far-right 1389 Movement broke up a meeting of Women in Black by shouting the slogan and throwing smoke bombs.

In 2021, Serbia banned a T-shirt retailer from selling shirts with the slogan "Nož, žica" on them.

=== Use at sports games ===
In 2002, at a football game in Sarajevo, fans of a Banja Luka-based team held up a sign with the slogan on it. In February 2012, a few fans of Maribor chanted it at a handball match between teams from Maribor, Slovenia and Gradačac, Bosnia and Herzegovina. On 11 March 2014, a friendly match between youth teams from Bosnia and Herzegovina and Serbia at the Stadion Dr. Milan Jelić in Modriča was terminated after 60 minutes due to chanting of "Nož, žica, Srebrenica" in the stands. The referee stopped the match for a few minutes within the first half of the game following hateful anti-Bosniak chants from the spectators. The spectators were reacting to the sending off of Milan Gajić, a player for the Serbian OFK Beograd, who verbally assaulted Bosniak referee Elvis Mujović. The crowd shouted "Ubij Turčina" (Kill the Turk), "Turk" being an ethnic slur used by Serbs to refer to Bosniaks.

Other related slogans, as well as "Nož, žica, Srebrenica", were used at an international match between Serbia and Montenegro and Bosnia and Herzegovina during the 2006 FIFA World Cup qualification such as "Ratko, hvala ti" (Ratko, thank you), "Škorpioni" (Scorpions), the aforementioned "Ubij Turčina (Kill the Turks, in reference to the supposed ambiguity of Bosniaks and their ethnic origins)", "Biće Bosna srce Srbije" (Bosnia will be the heart of Serbia), and "Bijeljina Srbija, nikad BiH" (Bijeljina [is] Serbia, never B&H), where Serbs of Bijeljina (in Republika Srpska) apparently expressed their support for Serbia and Montenegro and not the country of which they were citizens.

==== Use by others ====
Although it is mainly a Serbian slogan, it is also common to see Croats chanting anti-Bosniak chants. Anti-Bosniak expressions among Croats are also seen with "Nož, žica, Srebrenica" was deemed due to hostility among Croats and Bosniaks. During the 2018 FIFA World Cup, after Croatia beat England 2–1, a number of Croats in Herzegovina were recorded celebrating the victory citing the slogan.

In Greece, the issue was raised during the 2018 FIFA World Cup qualification when the Greeks raised the banner saying "Nož, žica, Srebrenica". Greece drew 1–1 to Bosnia and Herzegovina, which secured Greece's position to qualify for the play-off. The Hellenic Football Federation apologized afterwards.

== See also ==
- Srbe na vrbe, anti-Serb slogan
