= Nož =

Nož or Nozh may refer to:

- Nož (1967 film), a Yugoslav film
- The Dagger (1999 film) (Nož), a Yugoslav film
- Nozh (explosive reactive armour)

== See also ==
- Noz (disambiguation)
- Nož, žica, Srebrenica, a Serbian hate slogan
