= Saša Dujović =

Serbian politician (1966–2021)

Saša Dujović (Serbian Cyrillic: Саша Дујовић; 19 August 1966 – 30 July 2021) was a Serbian politician. He was a member of the National Assembly of Serbia from 2008 to 2014, initially as a member of the Movement of Veterans of Serbia (PVS) and later as the leader of the breakaway Movement of Veterans (PV). For his entire tenure as a parliamentarian, he served in the assembly group of the Socialist Party of Serbia (SPS).

Dujović later became a prominent member of the far-right Serbian Right (SD). His last years were dominated by a family tragedy, and he died by suicide in 2021.

== Early life and private career ==
Dujović was born in Belgrade, in what was then the Socialist Republic of Serbia in the Socialist Federal Republic of Yugoslavia. He was an electric welder and performed military service with the Yugoslav People's Army in Koprivnica in Croatia.

Dujović participated in the Yugoslav Wars of the 1990s, including at Lika, and was wounded twice. He later became active with Serbia's Association of Disabled Veterans and was its vice-president in the late 1990s.

At the end of his life, Dujović was president of the Association of Disabled Veterans of Serbia of All Wars.

== Politician ==
=== Movement of Veterans of Serbia ===
Dujović joined the Movement of Veterans of Serbia on its formation in 2002. The PVS formed an alliance with the Socialist Party for the 2007 Serbian parliamentary election, and Dujović appeared in the twenty-ninth position on the SPS list. The party won sixteen seats, and the PVS was awarded one mandate, which went to party leader Željko Vasiljević. (From 2000 to 2011, Serbian parliamentary mandates were awarded to sponsoring parties or coalitions rather than to individual candidates, and it was common practice for the mandates to be assigned out of numerical order. Dujović's list position had no specific bearing on his changes of election.)

The PVS's alliance with the Socialist Party continued into the 2008 parliamentary election, and Dujović received the seventy-first position on the SPS's coalition list. The list won twenty seats, and Vasiljević was again chosen as the PVS's representative in the SPS assembly group. Dujović also appeared in the fourth position on the SPS's list for the Zemun municipal assembly in the concurrent 2008 Serbian local elections; the list fell below the electoral threshold for assembly representation.

Vasiljević resigned from the assembly on 27 August 2008 to became a state secretary in the government of Serbia, and Dujović was chosen on 2 September as his replacement. The Socialist Party was at this time a junior partner in a coalition government with the For a European Serbia (ZES) alliance led by the Democratic Party (DS), and Dujović supported the ZES-led administration in the assembly. In his first term, he was the chair of the committee for petitions and proposals; a member of the committee for Kosovo and Metohija and the poverty reduction committee; a deputy member of the committee for environmental protection and the committee for labour, veterans, and social affairs; and a member of the parliamentary friendship groups with Cuba, Israel, and Slovakia.

=== Movement of Veterans ===
The PVS split into two factions in late 2008. Vasiljević's branch changed its name to the Party of Veterans of Serbia, while Dujović formed the Movement of Veterans as a breakaway group and was formally chosen as its leader on 7 February 2009. The division in the PVS did not affect Dujović's alliance with the Socialist Party.

The municipality of Zemun held an off-year election in 2009, and Dujović appeared in the eighth position on the SPS list. The list won four seats, and he was not chosen for a mandate at the municipal level.

Serbia's electoral laws were reformed in 2011, such that all mandates were awarded to candidates on successful lists in numerical order. Dujović received the forty-fourth position on the SPS's list and was re-elected when the list won exactly forty-four seats. The SPS formed a new coalition government with the Serbian Progressive Party (SNS) and other parties, and Dujović again served as a supporter of the administration. He was a member of the committee on labour, social affairs, social inclusion, and poverty reduction; a member of the committee on agriculture, forestry, and water management; a deputy member of the committee on Kosovo and Metohija and the committee on the diaspora and Serbs in the region; and a member of the friendship groups with the Czech Republic, India, Israel, Portugal, and Syria.

Dujović appeared in the largely ceremonial fifty-seventh position (out of fifty-seven) on the SPS's list for Zemun in the 2013 local elections. Election from this position was a mathematical impossibility, and he was not elected when the list won eight seats.

In December 2013, Dujović signed an agreement with Democratic Party of Serbia (DSS) leader Vojislav Koštunica for cooperation between their parties. He remained a member of the Socialist Party caucus until the end of the 2012–14 assembly term and appeared in the thirty-first position on the DSS list in the 2014 parliamentary election. The list did not cross the electoral threshold.

In late 2014, Dujović spoke against the Serbian government's proposed new law on veterans and disability protection, describing it as "devastating," and saying that veterans would not receive national recognition, veteran's allowance, health insurance, or other benefits.

=== Serbian-Russian Movement ===
Dujović joined the Serbian-Russian Movement (SRP) on its formation in 2015 and was chosen as its vice-president. He appeared in the second position on the movement's list in the 2016 parliamentary election, during which time he announced an agreement with the United Russia party and actively campaigned for the votes of Kosovo Serbs. The list fell well below the electoral threshold.

In December 2017, Dujović was hired as an independent advisor to Zoran Đorđević, Serbia's minister of labour, employment, veterans, and social policy. His responsibilities included working with the European Union on matters related to co-operation and financial aid.

=== Serbian Right ===
Dujović was elected as vice-president of the Serbian Right at its founding convention in January 2018. His continued employment in a government position after joining a far-right party became a source of controversy, and the League of Social Democrats of Vojvodina (LSV) called for his dismissal in July 2018.

== Final years and death ==
In July 2019, Dujović's son and one of his daughters were arrested for the gruesome murder of Majda Garović, an elderly woman in Zemun. He immediately resigned his state position and his leadership role in the Serbian Right, saying, "my children, if they are guilty, must answer like everyone who is guilty." His son was cleared of any involvement in the crime following an investigation, but his daughter was required to stand trial.

Dujović killed himself with a gunshot to the head on 30 July 2021.

His daughter was convicted of Garović's murder in January 2023.
