= Sanja Žigić =

Serbian politician

Sanja Žigić (Serbian Cyrillic: Сања Жигић; born 11 October 1970) is a politician in Serbia. She served in the Assembly of Vojvodina from 2016 to 2020 and is now the president (i.e., speaker) of the municipal assembly of Vrbas. Žigić is a member of the Serbian Progressive Party.

== Early life and private career ==
Žigić was born in Vrbas, Vojvodina, in what was then the Socialist Republic of Serbia in the Socialist Federal Republic of Yugoslavia. She majored in business management at Union University in Belgrade.

== Politician ==
Žigić received the ninth position on the Progressive Party's electoral list for the Vrbas municipal assembly in the 2013 Serbian local elections and was elected when the list won eighteen out of thirty-six mandates. She resigned from the assembly on 7 November 2013, after being appointed as chief of cabinet in the mayor's office.

She was subsequently given the sixteenth position on the Progressive Party's list for the 2016 Vojvodina provincial election and was elected when the list won a majority victory with sixty-three out of 120 seats. For the next four years, she served as part of the provincial government's majority in the assembly. She did not seek re-election at the provincial level in 2020.

Žigić was given the tenth position on Progressive list for Vrbas in the 2020 local elections and was elected to a second term at the local level when the list won a majority victory with twenty-two mandates. She was chosen as speaker of the assembly on 21 August 2020.
