= Željko Vasiljević =

Serbian politician

- Жељко Васиљевић

Member of the National Assembly of the Republic of Serbia
- In office 14 February 2007 – 27 August 2008

Leader of the Movement of Veterans of Serbia/Party of Veterans of Serbia [as a political party]
- In office 2005–2010

Personal details
- Born: 25 May 1963 (age 62) Belgrade, SR Serbia, SFR Yugoslavia

Željko Vasiljević (Serbian Cyrillic: Жељко Васиљевић; born 25 May 1963) is a Serbian politician and military veterans' representative. He is a longtime president of the Association of Disabled Veterans of Serbia of All Wars and leader of the Movement of Veterans of Serbia (PVS).

Vasiljević served in the Serbian national assembly from 2007 to 2008 in the parliamentary group of the Socialist Party of Serbia (SPS) and was a state secretary in the Serbian government from 2008 to 2009.

== Early life and private career ==
Vasiljević was born in Belgrade, in what was then the Socialist Republic of Serbia in the Socialist Federal Republic of Yugoslavia. He was raised in the city and worked in private business as an electrical technician. In 1991, he was seriously wounded in the Battle of Vukovar. He joined the Association of Disabled Veterans in 1994.

== Veterans representative and politician ==
=== Early years ===
Vasiljević led a protest of the Association of Disabled Veterans in November 2001, demanding that the Yugoslavian government pay overdue allowances and increase funding for military invalids. He was a founding member of the Movement of Veterans of Serbia in 2002 and became its president in 2005.

=== First assembly term (2007–08) ===
The Movement of Veterans of Serbia formed an alliance with the Socialist Party of Serbia for the 2007 Serbian parliamentary election, and Vasiljević received the tenth position on the SPS electoral list. The party won sixteen seats, and he was awarded an assembly mandate when the new legislature convened. (From 2000 to 2011, Serbian parliamentary mandates were awarded to sponsoring parties or coalitions rather than individual candidates, and it was common practice for the mandates to be assigned out of numerical order. Vasiljević was not automatically elected by virtue of his list position.) The Democratic Party (DS), Democratic Party of Serbia (DSS), and G17 Plus formed an unstable coalition government after the 2007 election, and Vasiljević served with the Socialist parliamentary group in opposition. He was a member of the committee for trade and tourism.

Vasiljević played a prominent role in the establishment of the St. Tsar Lazar Guard at the Lazarica Church in Kruševac on 5 May 2007. The guard's intended purpose was to fight for Kosovo as an integral part of Serbia in the event that the province declared independence. In advance of the 5 May meeting, Vasiljević said that its founding members would be "the first company of the Christian militia in uniform, made up of experienced war veterans from about thirty Serbian towns." Serbia's interior ministry expressed concern about the formation of a new paramilitary group in Serbia, though Vasiljević said that the guard was not planning to act outside state institutions. "All we want is to place ourselves at [the disposal of] the army and the police, in case Kosovo declares independence," he said.

When the guard was formed, Vasiljević was quoted as saying, "The struggle of the Serbian people for the right to live in these areas, free, proud and in the spirit of Christianity, has been going on for fifteen years. A lot of money was spent, NGOs and media were engaged in the fight against us." He said that the group's enemy was not the Albanian people generally but rather what he described as "the Albanian al-Qaeda."

Although the guard received attention in the international media, it was not a significant factor in the events surrounding Kosovo's 2008 declaration of independence, and it ceased to exist shortly thereafter.

=== Second assembly term and state secretary (2008–09) ===
The Movement of Veterans of Serbia continued its association with the Socialist Party in the 2008 parliamentary election, and Vasiljević appeared in the fifteenth position on the SPS's coalition list. The list won twenty seats, and he was given a mandate for a second term. The overall results of the election were inconclusive, and after extended negotiations the For a European Serbia (ZES) alliance led by the Democratic Party formed a new coalition government with the Socialists. As a member of the SPS group, Vasiljević supported the ZES-led ministry in the assembly. In his second term, he was a member of the committee for Kosovo and Metohija and the committee for petitions and proposals.

Vasiljević resigned from the assembly on 27 August 2008 after being appointed as a state secretary in the ministry of labour and social policy. Shortly after his appointment, he suggested that more than one hundred thousand women could be brought to Serbia from Russia and other Eastern European nations and from Southeast Asia to marry Serbian farmers. He was quoted as saying that women from the regions in question "are modest, know how to work hard, and do want to have children, unlike Serb young women who run to the cities in search of better lives." This comment was met with widespread derision, and he offered an apology.

The Movement of Veterans of Serbia split into two factions in late 2008. The branch led by Vasiljević renamed itself as the Party of Veterans of Serbia (also abbreviated as PVS) on 13 December 2008, and the name change was made official by Serbia's ministry of public administration and local self-government in January 2009. The other wing, led by Saša Dujović, became known as the Movement of Veterans (PV).

The PVS's alliance with the Socialist Party broke down in 2009, and Vasiljević was removed as a state secretary in September of that year at the SPS's initiative. Rasim Ljajić, the minister of labour and social policy, welcomed Vasiljević's departure and said that he had wanted to fire him much sooner. "There was no benefit from him, only great damage," Ljajić said. "Because of his statements, I had to apologize to many people, and not to mention the ridicule of colleagues from abroad." For his part, Vasiljević said, "I guess I got fired because I talked a lot against the government, which did nothing to help the veteran population, except send the police to remove them from the streets."

=== After 2010 ===
Vasiljević was arrested on suspicion of forging signatures for the registration of the Party of Veterans of Serbia in March 2010. Online accounts do not indicate how the matter was resolved, but the party was disestablished shortly thereafter. He became president of a relaunched Movement of Veterans of Serbia later in 2010, although it largely ceased to function as a political party after this time.

Vasiljević supported Boris Tadić's bid for re-election in the 2012 Serbian presidential election and offered support to the Democratic Party in the concurrent Vojvodina provincial election.

In 2015, Vasiljević led in the PVS in a protest outside the Serbian ministry of defence. When minister Aleksandar Vulin refused to meet with the protesters, he said, "[Vulin] is not interested in our demands, nor in hearing what we have to tell him, and that is because we will not be an association of the Movement of Socialists (PS), because that is the only thing this ministry deals with."

Serbia's electoral laws were reformed in 2011, such that all mandates were awarded to candidates on successful lists in numerical order. Vasiljević appeared in the fifth position on an independent list called For the Revival of Serbia in the 2016 Serbian parliamentary election. The list fell well below the electoral threshold for assembly representation.

Vasiljević endorsed Vuk Jeremić in the 2017 Serbian presidential election. In 2019, he published a book entitled, After Jasenovac – Lora, about conditions in Croatia's Lora prison camp during the 1991–95 Croatian war.

In December 2023, Vasiljević and Belgrade's interim mayor Aleksandar Šapić unveiled the Monument to the Victims of the Wars and Defenders of the Fatherland 1990–99 in a park at Hajduk Veljkov venac. This was a successor to an earlier monument in a different location that had been removed due to public works.
