= Tsar Lazar Guard =

Serbian political organization

- Formation: 2007
- Founder: Andrej Milić and Željko Vasiljević
- Type: Far-right organization
- Location: Serbia
- Ideology: Serbian ultranationalism Anti-Albanian sentiment Islamophobia; Christian right
- Political position: Far-right

The St. Tsar Lazar Guard (Serbian: Гарда светог цара Лазара, romanized: Garda svetog cara Lazara), commonly known as Tsar Lazar Guard (Гарда цара Лазара), is a far-right paramilitary organization led by Hadži Andrej Milić and Željko Vasiljević. It was formed by the Movement of Veterans of Serbia to fight against Kosovar independence from Serbia. It is named after Prince Lazar of Serbia, who died in the Battle of Kosovo.

== History ==
On 5 May 2007, the National Serbian Movement hosted a Serbian Assembly in the Lazarica Church in Kruševac where it swore in "the Saint Tsar Lazar Guard vowed to free Kosovo and Metohija." Vasiljević stated it would be "the establishment of a first uniformed Christian militia squad, comprised of war veterans from all over Serbia." It resulted in the formation of the organization. Serbian police detained 27 people at the event. Its leaders estimated that the organization had around 5,000 members, while other sources estimated no more than several hundred. Kosovan Serbs and Macedonian Serbs have been members of the organization.

On 28 June 2007, the Guard took part in the Battle of Kosovo commemoration organized by the Serbian government. UN officials reacted strongly to the Guard's presence, and international officials claimed that it was provocation and attempt to destabilize the situation. The United Nations Interim Administration Mission in Kosovo (UNMIK) has prohibited the organization from entering Kosovo and deemed it illegal. The organization stated that all Albanians will be killed or expelled and threatened Serbs who disagreed with their views.

In mid-November 2007, the group said that war in Kosovo was inevitable, with Milić saying that "Just as Martić shelled Zagreb, we will do the same to Priština. Since the Šiptars have reproduced like rabbits, they will die like rabbits. There will be no survivors. God help the Serbian military and police if they try and get in our way. We will view them as the enemy, and we will do to them the same as we'll do to the Šiptars." In late November, he was detained by Serbian police, but later released. It wanted the Serbian parliament to intervene militarily in Kosovo, however its relationship with the Serbian government has been negative. After Kosovo declared independence in February 2008, the organization's activists attacked buildings and vehicles of the UNMIK on its administrative border. On 23 February 2008, the organization claimed responsibility for the burning of the border post at Rudnica. Milić was arrested on 9 September 2010, after threats against the year's Pride parade. He claimed that he suffered a heart attack while imprisoned in Belgrade.
