= Movement of Veterans =

The Movement of Veterans (Serbian Cyrillic: Покрет ветерана, romanized: Pokret veterana, PV) was a Serbian political party that existed from 2009 to about 2017. It was established after a split in the Movement of Veterans of Serbia (PVS) in late 2008.

The Movement of Veterans was led by Saša Dujović, who served in the National Assembly of Serbia from 2008 to 2014 in the parliamentary group of the Socialist Party of Serbia (SPS).

== Origins ==
The Movement of Veterans of Serbia was established in 2002, with the stated goals of developing Serbia's democratic institutions and protecting the rights of Serbian military veterans. The PVS formed an alliance with the Socialist Party of Serbia for the 2007 Serbian parliamentary election; party leader Željko Vasiljević appeared on the SPS electoral list and was given an assembly mandate when the list won sixteen seats.

Vasiljević again appeared on the SPS's list in the 2008 parliamentary election and received a mandate for a second term when the list won twenty seats. He resigned shortly thereafter to take a state secretary position in the Serbian government, and Dujović was chosen as his replacement in the assembly in September 2008. The SPS formed a coalition government with the For a European Serbia (ZES) alliance after the 2008 election, and both Vasiljević and Dujović supported the ZES-led ministry in the 2008–12 term.

The PVS split into two groups in December 2008. The branch led by Vasiljević renamed itself as the Party of Veterans of Serbia. Dujović's group became the Movement of Veterans, and he was formally chosen as its leader on 7 February 2009.

The Movement of Veterans considered itself as upholding the PVS's original goals and described itself as "a new-old political option that will fight for the rights of veterans in Serbia, their better social status, and a life worthy of man in the 21st century." Dujović remained a member of the Socialist Party caucus after founding the PV.

== History ==
Dujović was elected to a second term in the national assembly in the 2012 parliamentary election, once again on the list of the Socialist Party. The Socialists formed a new administration with the Serbian Progressive Party (SNS) and other parties, and he again supported the government in the assembly.

Dujović and United Peasant Party (USS) leader Milija Miletić signed a protocol in March 2012 for cooperation between their parties in the Serbian parliament.

In December 2013, Dujović signed another cooperation agreement with Democratic Party of Serbia (DSS) leader Vojislav Koštunica. While he remained a member of the Socialist Party caucus, he later appeared in the thirty-first position on the DSS list in the 2014 parliamentary election. The list did not cross the electoral threshold for assembly representation, and his term in the assembly came to an end.

In late 2014, Dujović spoke against the Serbian government's proposed new law on veterans and disability protection, describing it as "devastating," and saying that veterans would not receive national recognition, veteran's allowance, health insurance, or other benefits.

Dujović joined the Serbian-Russian Movement (SRP) on its formation in late 2015, and the Movement of Veterans later announced its cooperation with the new party in the 2016 parliamentary election. The SRP list did not cross the electoral threshold.

In October 2017, the PV took part in what was described as a parliament of right-wing Serbian political parties. Dujović became vice-president of the far-right Serbian Right party on its formation in January 2018, and the PV seems to have dissolved at around this time.
