= Enlargement of the Eurasian Economic Union =

Potential accession of new countries to the Eurasian Economic Union

The future enlargement of the Eurasian Economic Union is theoretically open to any of the post-Soviet states and potentially any country of Europe or Asia. In order to accede, a state must fulfill certain economic and political requirements. Enlargement of the Eurasian Economic Union is also subject to the consent of all existing members and the candidate's adoption of existing EEU laws and implementing previous decisions made by the Eurasian Economic Commission. The present agenda of the enlargement of the Eurasian Economic Union is primarily focused on Tajikistan. Meanwhile, Moldova was granted Observer Status in April 2017, followed by Uzbekistan and Cuba in December 2020. The process of enlargement is referred to as Eurasian integration or Eurasianism. This term is also used to refer to the intensification of economic cooperation between Eurasian Economic Union member states.

== Past enlargement ==
Member States of the Eurasian Economic Union Observer states Other candidate states

=== Armenia ===
In December 2012, Armenian president Serzh Sargsyan stated that EU, CIS and Eurasian integration need not be mutually exclusive. Maja Kocijancic, a spokeswoman for the former EU High Representative of the Union for Foreign Affairs and Security Policy, Catherine Ashton, responded that "if Armenia were to join any customs union, this would not be compatible with concluding a bilateral Deep and Comprehensive Free Trade Area between the EU and Armenia because a customs union has a common external trade policy and an individual member country no longer has sovereign control over its external trade policies."

Although Armenia completed its negotiations with the European Union towards signing an Association Agreement in July 2013, on 3 September 2013, President of Armenia Serzh Sargsyan announced in Moscow that Armenia will join the Customs Union of Belarus, Kazakhstan, and Russia. A Russian government communique stated that, "Armenia [has] decided to join the Customs Union and take the necessary practical steps to subsequently participate in the formation of the Eurasian Economic Union." This decision was widely described as a "U-turn" by the Western media. On 2 October 2013, Sargsyan stated at the Parliamentary Assembly of the Council of Europe session that Armenia was still prepared to sign a deal with the EU during the Eastern Partnership summit in Vilnius in November 2013, without the Deep and Comprehensive Free Trade Area component of the agreement that contradicts Armenia's membership in the Eurasian Customs Union. This proposal was rejected by the EU and no deal was signed between Armenia and the EU at the summit. On 9 October 2014, Armenia signed a treaty on its accession to the EEU and became the newest member state on 2 January 2015. Many criticized Russia for pressuring Sargsyan to abandon the deal with the EU.

Although Armenia's trade with members of the European Union far exceeds that with the Eurasian Customs Union members of Russia, Belarus and Kazakhstan combined, Armenia is dependent on Russia for security. Armenia's alliance with Russia is seen by Armenia as a counterbalance to Azerbaijan's sharp hike in military spending (Azerbaijan bought tanks, artillery cannons and rocket launchers worth billions of US dollars from Russia in 2011, 2012 and 2013). This is seen by Armenia as a threat given that the Nagorno-Karabakh conflict remains unresolved. Russia also maintains an active military base in Armenia.

==== Support and opposition ====
According to a poll conducted by Gallup International Association in October 2013, 64% of Armenians are in favor of Armenia's membership in the union. Past factions in the Armenian National Assembly, have either stated their support or their lack of opposition to the Armenian government's decision to join the union, while others favor launching accession negotiations with the European Union. Meanwhile, Levon Ter-Petrosyan, Armenia's First President and the leader of the Armenian National Congress, stated during a rally on 1 March 2014 that the decision is irreversible. In an October 2014 rally, Ter-Petrosyan reiterated that Armenia's membership is an "irreversible process" and is now a fait accompli. "He never said that the entry is profitable. Instead, he accused those who oppose it of 'adventurism'." He "cited the example of the events in Ukraine, which has lost a lot due to its failure to agree to join the 'New USSR', and the same could also happen to Armenia." Ter-Petrosyan stated: "Is it really so hard to understand that in such a situation our country would simply disappear from the world map? ... Even the West treats Armenia's decision with understanding, while a group of people here are trying to prove the opposite and push for an anti-Russian movement."

Among the most notable opponents of Armenia's membership to the union are the four former foreign affairs ministers: Raffi Hovannisian (1991–92), Vahan Papazyan (1993–96), Alexander Arzumanyan (1996–98) and Vartan Oskanian (1998–2008). Hovannisian, who officially came second in the 2013 presidential election, stated that Armenia's accession to the Eurasian Union "limits its sovereignty." Hovannisian's Heritage party opposes Armenia's membership in the union. Other significant politicians who have stated their opposition include former prime minister Aram Sargsyan and Soviet dissident Paruyr Hayrikyan, whose party Union for National Self-Determination, actively calls for Armenia to withdraw its membership from the Eurasian Union. Former prime minister Hrant Bagratyan, although not actively opposing the union, stated that Armenia is an "exclave" of the union and is not a "welcomed guest" there.

In 2013, Avetik Ishkhanyan, chairman of the Helsinki Committee of Armenia stated, "If the Armenian government had any intention of altering human rights protections [for the better], it would never have decided to join the Eurasian Economic Union, in which respect for human rights is absent at a structural level." Meanwhile, the Helsinki Citizens’ Assembly–Vanadzor submitted a motion to the Court of Appeal to declare the decision to join the Eurasian Union illegal.

In December 2014, leader of the Armenian National Movement Party, Ararat Zurabyan stated, "Armenia's membership in the Eurasian Economic Union is the beginning of the collapse of Armenia."

On 9 June 2015, Styopa Safaryan, Head of the Armenian Institute of International and Security Affairs, stated that Russia had blackmailed Armenia to not sign an Association Agreement with the EU. Safaryan said that Russia had isolated Armenia and called on Armenian authorities to resume negotiations on signing an agreement with the EU. On 10 August 2015, Safaryan also stated that there are no benefits of Armenia joining the Eurasian Economic Union and that joining the economic union had brought no improvements to the Armenian economy.

On 24 February 2017, Tigran Sargsyan, the chairman of the Eurasian Economic Commission stated that Armenia's stance was to cooperate and work with both the European Union and the Eurasian Union. Sargsyan added that although Armenia is part of the Eurasian Union, a newly revised Armenia-EU Comprehensive and Enhanced Partnership Agreement would be finalized in November 2017.

Prior to the 2018 Armenian parliamentary election, several political parties campaigned on a pro-European agenda. Bright Armenia, the Republic Party, the Rule of Law Party, the Free Democrats and the European Party of Armenia for example, support Armenia's withdrawal from the Eurasian Union and wish to renegotiate an Association Agreement including a Deep and Comprehensive Free Trade Area with the European Union.

A 2018 survey conducted by EU Neighbors East determined that 70% of people in Armenia trust the EU (up 5% from 2017), while trust in the Eurasian Economic Union (48%) has declined.

In November 2020, the European Party of Armenia, the Union for National Self-Determination and the Sasna Tsrer Pan-Armenian Party held a rally in central Yerevan. The three parties called for the creation of a truly sovereign Armenia by ending Russian political occupation, while aligning closer with Europe. Chairman of the European Party of Armenia, Tigran Khzmalyan, has also called for Armenia to withdraw from the CSTO military alliance.

On 8 March 2024, Armenian foreign minister Ararat Mirzoyan stated, "Armenia is seeking to get closer to the West amid worsening relations with Russia" and "New opportunities are largely being discussed in Armenia nowadays, that includes membership in the European Union".

Gurgen Simonyan, Chairman of the Meritocratic Party of Armenia, called for the complete withdrawal of Armenia from all Russian led organizations, including the Eurasian Union.

A July 2024 Gallup opinion poll found that 56.7% of respondents supported Armenia joining the European Union, while 28.8% believed Armenia should "definitely" strive for EU membership even if its at the cost of leaving the Eurasian Economic Union.

On 9 September 2024, prime minister Nikol Pashinyan confirmed that the issue of starting the EU membership process has become part of the Armenian political agenda. Pashinyan stated, "discussions are underway in the country regarding the possibility of Armenia becoming a member of the European Union," during a meeting with vice-president of the European Commission Margaritis Schinas.

On 12 February 2025, Armenia's parliament approved a bill officially endorsing Armenia's EU accession. In response, Russian Deputy Prime Minister Alexey Overchuk stated "the EU accession process will mark the beginning of Armenia's withdrawal from the Eurasian Economic Union." At the Eurasian Economic Union summit held in Astana, Kazakhstan on 28–29 May 2026, the leaders of four member countries (Belarus, Kazakhstan, Kyrgyzstan, and Russia) called on Armenia to hold a referendum as soon as possible on membership in either the European Union or the Eurasian Economic Union.

==== Republic of Artsakh ====
The former breakaway state of the Republic of Artsakh did not enter the Eurasian Union upon Armenia's accession in January 2015. However, the government of Armenia stressed that under no circumstances would a customs checkpoint be set up between Armenia and Artsakh.

=== Kyrgyzstan ===
In October 2011, the acting prime minister of Kyrgyzstan announced that his country will join the union, and that the process had been agreed to with the prime ministers of the other member states. On 11 August 2014, the Kyrgyz president Almazbek Atambayev, met with Russian president Vladimir Putin and stated that Kyrgyzstan plans to join the Eurasian Customs Union and the Eurasian Economic Union by the end of 2014. Kyrgyzstan signed an accession treaty on 23 December 2014. It ratified its accession treaty in May 2015, and it came into force on 6 August 2015, when it became the newest member state.

=== Crimea ===
The annexation of Crimea by the Russian Federation in early 2014 made Crimea a de facto part of the Eurasian Economic Union as a territory of Russia.

=== Southern and Eastern Ukraine ===
The Russian annexation of Donetsk, Kherson, Luhansk and Zaporizhzhia oblasts of Ukraine in 2022 has led to parts of Eastern and Southern Ukraine being annexed by Russia and de facto becoming new oblasts of Russia.

== Potential future enlargement ==
=== Azerbaijan ===
The Azerbaijani minister for the Economy, stated that the country is not prepared to join the union. Azerbaijan's foreign minister reiterated those statements by clarifying that joining the EEU was not currently on the country's agenda. The foreign minister however also reaffirmed the "warm and friendly relations between Russia and Azerbaijan based on mutual respect and mutually beneficial cooperation"

Azerbaijan's ambassador to Belarus also stated that Armenia's accession to the Eurasian Economic Union would not infringe upon the interests of Azerbaijan. He further stated “for our partners, as well as Azerbaijan, the union opens up great promises. It increases the market by several times and opens up great opportunities for our partners. We are optimistic about the future of this union.” He also expressed hope that the number of participants of the union will increase in the near future.

=== Cuba ===
On 11 December 2020, Cuba became an observer member in the Eurasian Union. Cuba becomes the first country outside Eurasia and the first country from the Americas to be granted observer status to the Eurasian Union. It is unclear if the country will seek full membership.

=== Georgia ===
In September 2013, during an interview, the Prime Minister Bidzina Ivanishvili was open to the possibility of Georgia joining the Customs Union "if it will be advantageous for our country". He later clarified that Georgia's main strategy was still to integrate into the European Union. Russia's prime minister Dmitri Medvedev included Georgia as a prospective member in statements made in August 2013.

Georgia signed a Deep and Comprehensive Free Trade Agreement with the EU in 2014, meaning it has affirmed to move towards EU standards, customs regulations, quality controls and free market competition. In response, Sergei Glazyev, a Russian presidential adviser, claimed it was now unlikely that Georgia could become a member of the Eurasian Economic Union.

In December 2015, Russian Deputy Foreign Minister Grigory Karasin stated that, "Moscow was ready to restore diplomatic relations with Tbilisi." A mutual visa-free system between Georgia and Russia was discussed, as part of the effort to reintroduce relations. In a March 18 interview, foreign minister Mikheil Janelidze said that further integration with the European Union, possible membership in NATO and restoring its international recognized borders are “red lines” in talks with Russia. He also said that, "This [bilateral] dialogue [with Russia] is oriented to find ways to have relations in those areas which are not out of the red lines."

==== Abkhazia ====
In 2014, a proposed treaty between Abkhazia and Russia was announced which would bring the de facto Republic in closer union with Russia and in alignment with the Russia-led Eurasian Economic Union. Abkhazia would also have to harmonize its tax and customs regulations with those of the Eurasian Economic Union.

==== South Ossetia ====
Like Abkhazia, the breakaway region of South Ossetia has proclaimed its desire to integrate closer with and perhaps join the Eurasian Economic Union.

=== Moldova ===
In 2014, the Moldovan government rejected the idea of Eurasian Economic Union and instead signed the Moldova–European Union Association Agreement, a European Union Association Agreement establishing closer Moldovan–EU ties.

In February 2014, over the objections of the Moldovan central government, the Autonomous Territorial Unit of Gagauzia (which had a population of about 155,000 at the time) held two referendums on European integration. In one, 98.4% voted in favor of joining the Customs Union of Belarus, Kazakhstan, and Russia, while in the second 97.2% opposed further integration with the EU. 98.9% also supported the proposition that Gagauzia could declare independence if Moldova unified with Romania. Many locals in Gagauzia feared that closer EU integration was a step toward the unification of Moldova and Romania, which is unpopular in the autonomous region. The referendum was disputed by Moldovan authorities, who termed it unconstitutional, and a challenge to the territorial integrity of Moldova.

In January 2017, newly elected President Igor Dodon said that he intended to have Moldova scrap its trade agreement with the European Union (EU) in favour of joining the Eurasian Union. Dodon, the first Moldovan president to visit Russia for nine years, said he had asked Vladimir Putin to look into how Moldova could join Eurasian Economic Union's regulatory body.

On March 22, 2017, the president of Moldova confirmed he has formally initiated the process for granting observer status to Moldova in the Eurasian Union. At the end of May, the member states of the union will analyze Moldova's request, which is the first step towards the country becoming part of the EAEU, said the president.

On April 14, 2017, The president of Moldova confirmed that Moldova became the first Observer member of the Eurasian Union.

In October 2019, during a meeting in Yerevan, President Igor Dodon stated that he hoped to establish a permanent representative of Moldova to the Eurasian Economic Commission.

In a 2022 poll, it was shown that 41.5% of Moldovans would support joining the Eurasian Economic Union and that 37.2% of Moldovans would oppose this. Furthermore, if Moldovans could choose between joining the EEU or joining the European Union (EU), 31.9% would prefer to join the former while 46.2% would choose to join the latter.

==== Transnistria ====
In December 2016, presidential elections took place in the self-proclaimed republic of Transnistria, a breakaway state that is internationally unrecognized (see political status of Transnistria). In his victory speech, President Vadim Krasnoselsky promised to integrate Transnistria into the Eurasian Economic Union.

=== Mongolia ===
In September 2016, the press service of the Eurasian Economic Commission issued a statement after a meeting attended by chairman of the Board of the Union Tigran Sargsyan and Ambassador of Mongolia to Russia Banzragch Delgermaa that Mongolia was considering seeking membership in the Eurasian Economic Union.

=== Serbia ===
The 1389 Movement in Serbia supports Serbian membership of the organisation. The Russian Party in Serbia also supports membership

=== Tajikistan ===
Tajikistan plans to join the Customs Union. The country has signed the CIS Free Trade Zone Agreement and is close to ratifying the treaty. A border dispute with EEU member Kyrgyzstan has arisen as a potential obstacle. Support for joining the bloc remains high in Tajikistan, according to polls conducted by the Eurasian Development Bank in October 2016, showed that 68 percent of people quizzed in Tajikistan favored membership.

=== Turkey ===
A statement by the Kazakhstan Presidential Office on the 6 June 2014 said that Kazakhstan President Nursultan Nazarbayev had extended an invitation to the president of Turkey Abdullah Gül for his country to join the Eurasian Economic Union. The statement was released the day after the fourth summit of the Cooperation Council of Turkic-Speaking States (Turkic Council) on June 4 and 5 in the Turkish port city of Bodrum. However Turkey presently has a customs agreement with the EU. Turkey is currently a candidate country for the European Union and a full member of NATO.

=== Turkmenistan ===
Turkmenistan is closely integrated economically with other Central Asian and Commonwealth of Independent States members. However, Turkmenistan has pursued a policy of political isolation and currently has not stated plans to either join or not join the EEU.

=== Ukraine ===
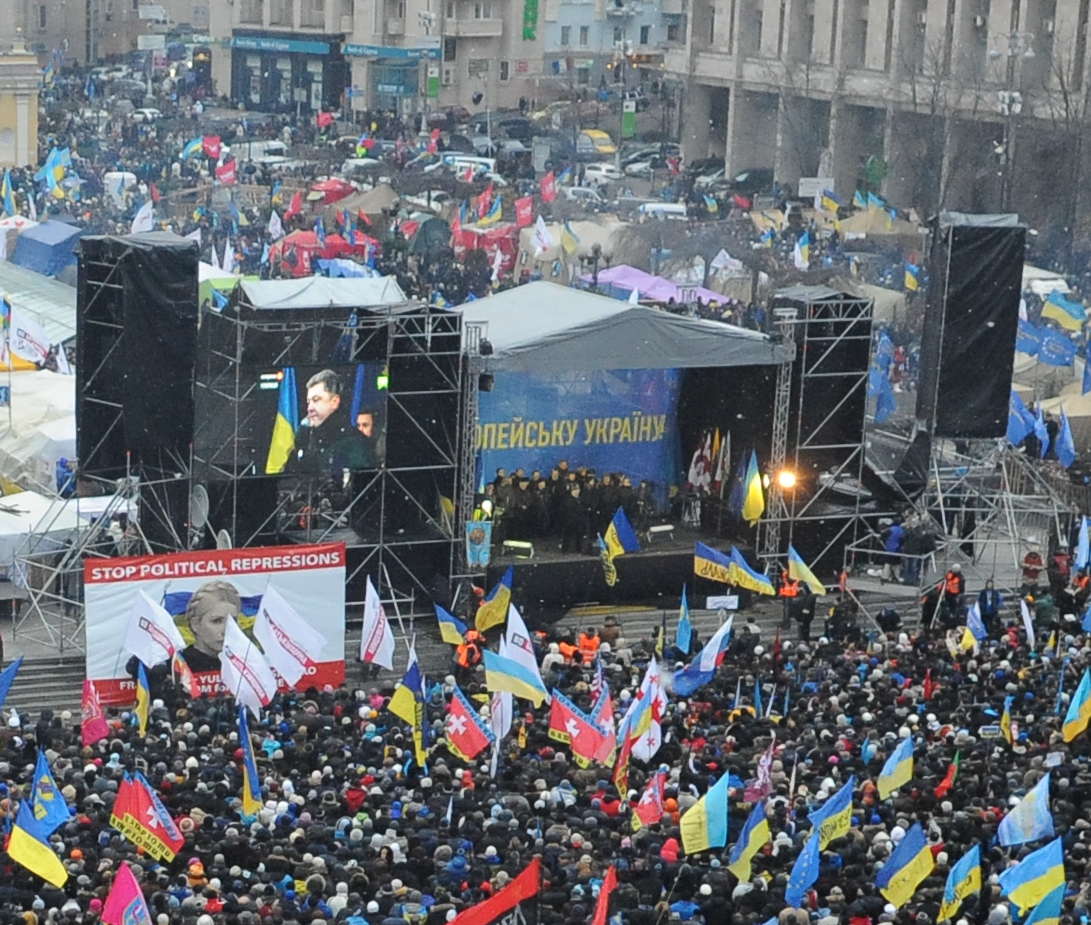
Petro Poroshenko on stage speaking to Euromaidan protesters on 8 December 2013

==== Membership in the Customs Union ====
The former president of Ukraine, Viktor Yanukovych, stated in November 2010 and March 2012 that Ukraine may join the Customs Union in the future, but that the Constitution of Ukraine did not presently allow it to join. However, he also stated in April 2010 that Ukraine would not join the Customs Union. During this time, Ukraine was negotiating an Association Agreement with the European Union which was seen by the EU as being incompatible with Ukraine entering the Customs Union; the latter would end the chances for the Association Agreement according to European Commission President José Manuel Barroso. Yanukovych at the time stated he wanted to pursue EU membership for Ukraine. In May 2011, Yanukovych stated that Ukraine was "searching for mechanisms of cooperation that will allow us to work with the customs union to the extent which Ukrainian laws and our obligations to world organizations such as the World Trade Organization allow”. Yanukovych would later say that he was in negotiations with Russia to "find the right model" for cooperation with the Customs Union, while simultaneously trying to get Ukraine's agreements with the EU on free trade and political association signed by the EU. He also expressed hope that the Association Agreement with the EU would be signed in 2013.

Then Ukrainian prime minister Mykola Azarov stated in December 2012 that Ukraine could and should cooperate with both the Customs Union and the European Union at the same time. In January 2013, President Yanukovych stated that he had cancelled a visit to Moscow in December 2012 because his country was not yet ready to join the Customs Union. He further stated that Ukraine was trying to meet the legal requirements of the customs union without harming other international accords and that "experts from both sides [Ukraine and Russia] are currently working on this issue". However, he did not commit Ukraine to joining the union. Arseniy Yatsenyuk, the leader of Batkivshchyna, Ukraine's second largest party, was against Ukraine joining the Customs Union. He stated in December 2012 that "Ukraine's joining the Customs Union means the restoration of the Soviet Union in a slightly different form and with a different name. But this means that the country will become a part of the Russian Empire. We know history. We have been there and we don't want to return there".

On 25 February 2013, President of the European Commission Barroso made it again clear "One country cannot at the same time be a member of a customs union and be in a deep common free-trade area with the European Union". In March 2013 Ukraine and the EU initialled their Association Agreement with the EU, which still needed to be signed and ratified before its entry into force. Chairman of the Verkhovna Rada (Ukraine's parliament) Volodymyr Rybak stated on 7 March 2013 "the Customs Union issue is not being discussed".

A December 2012 poll by Democratic Initiatives Foundation and Razumkov Center, 32% supported Ukraine's accession to the Customs Union.

==== Observer status of the Customs Union ====
Negotiations on granting Ukraine observer status in the Customs Union took place in April/May 2013. This status would give Ukraine the right to attend meetings, join the preparation of documents but excludes the right to vote. An association agreement to grant Ukraine an "observer" status was signed on 31 May 2013 in Minsk. Ukraine's status as an observer state was said to not conflict with its then planned Association Agreement with the EU. Prime Minister Mykola Azarov stated on 7 June 2013 that "very favorable terms", including "a sharp reduction in gas price and the cancellation of crude oil export duties", had been offered to Ukraine for its accession to the Customs Union, but stressed that its membership of the World Trade Organization, and associated agreements, prevented Ukraine from joining the Customs Union. This status would be abrogated if Ukraine enters the European Union.

==== Signature of their Association Agreement with the EU ====
Yanukovych eventually refused to sign the Association Agreement in November 2013, which led to protests that lead to his ousting in February 2014. The new government of Ukraine and the EU signed an Association Agreement on 21 March and 27 June 2014. On 30 June 2014, Russian presidential aide (for developing the Customs Union) (Then Advisor to Russian president Vladimir Putin) Sergei Glazyev stated that the signing of the EU Association Agreements by Ukraine, Moldova and Georgia meant that they could not join the Customs Union or the Common Economic Space. He described it as "a significant loss for us".

==== Luhansk People's Republic ====
In June 2014 officials of the Luhansk People's Republic, a self-proclaimed breakaway region, stated that the Republic would seek cooperation with international bodies in the post-Soviet space, including the Eurasian Union.

==== Donetsk People's Republic ====
In 2014 the pro-Russian self-proclaimed Donetsk People's Republic rejected Ukrainian EU integration and expressed an interest in acceding to the Customs Union.

=== Uzbekistan ===
Senate Speaker Ilgizar Sobirov, head of the Uzbekistan parliament's upper chamber, showed support in joining the Russian-led trade bloc on 12 November 2013, after meeting a delegation from the Russian parliament's upper chamber.

On 29 May 2014, Uzbekistan's president Islam Karimov criticized the union on the basis of loss of sovereignty and expressed his opposition to the project.

In December 2016, Uzbekistan's new president Shavkat Mirziyoyev, reportedly revisited the topic of Uzbekistan potentially joining the Moscow-led Eurasian Economic Union.

In April 2018, Uzbekistan began reforming its import tariffs and regulations to match EAEU norms, in an attempt to develop economic growth and mutual trade with EAEU members.

In October 2019, Uzbek government officials announced that Uzbekistan will aim to complete negotiations for a free trade deal with the Eurasian Union by the end of 2021.

In March 2020, Uzbekistan announced that it wished to become a Eurasian Union observer state.

In April 2020, Uzbekistan's parliament approved a bill confirming the government's intention to seek observer status. If the senate approves it, the bill will go to the president, which if signed, a formal request to be accepted as an observer state will be made.

On 11 December 2020, Uzbekistan became an observer member of the Eurasian Economic Union.

== Free trade agreements ==
In January 2017, Russian foreign minister Sergei Lavrov stated that around 50 countries expressed their willingness to cooperate with the Eurasian Union. In March 2017, the president of Kazakhstan, Nursultan Nazarbayev stated that he is optimistic about the future of the Eurasian Economic Union and its potential growth. He further added that the market of the Eurasian Economic Union countries with their population of over 183 million is very promising and believes that other trade blocs including the European Union, ASEAN, Mercosur, and the Shanghai Cooperation Organisation could be interested in possible future trade deals. Some of these relationships are outlined below:

=== Andean Community ===
A memorandum of understanding between the Eurasian Economic Commission and the Andean Community was signed on 23 March 2017. The memorandum provides a platform for information exchange and joint activities including conferences and forums of the representatives of business communities and authorities from the EAEU and Andean Community member states.

=== Argentina ===
In December 2018, the Argentine president Mauricio Macri held talks with Russia's Vladimir Putin on the sidelines of the 2018 G20 Buenos Aires summit. The leaders discussed trade talks between South America's Mercosur and the Eurasian Economic Union. The president of Argentina stated that he would bring the trade blocs and regions closer together. In February 2019, the vice president of Argentina, Gabriela Michetti met with Armenian ambassador in Buenos Aires and reaffirmed both the EAEU and Mercosur would benefit from maximizing cooperation.

As of 2021, negotiation of a free trade zone between Argentina and the Eurasian Union is on-going.

=== ASEAN ===
In November 2016, the ASEAN Secretariat and the foreign minister of Armenia held meetings in Jakarta. The foreign minister of Armenia stated that Armenia is keen on forging cooperative relations with ASEAN and its Member States, and would also push for region-to-region cooperation between ASEAN and the Eurasian Economic Union. The Secretary-General of ASEAN also exchanged views on the potentials for closer cooperation between ASEAN and the EAEU.

In September 2019, during a trip to Yerevan, Prime Minister of Singapore Lee Hsien Loong stated that Singapore supports the creation of a free trade area comprising all Eurasian Union and ASEAN member states. The Prime Minister advised that the new Singapore-EAEU free trade deal which was recently finalized, could serve as a pathfinder for a future FTA between the EAEU and ASEAN.

=== Bangladesh ===
Officials in Bangladesh are pushing for closer links with the Eurasian Union. The Ministry of Commerce of Bangladesh has signed a Memorandum of Understanding with the EAEU in July 2016 and now the country is seeking to sign a free trade deal with the EAEU in order to get duty-free access to the Eurasian market of 183 million people.

=== Brazil ===
In May 2017, government officials of Belarus and Brazil met in Minsk to discuss the establishment and development of Brazil-EAEU relations. The parties discussed a wide range of issues from trade and economic investments, to the interaction between the Eurasian Economic Union and the South American Common Market (MERCOSUR).

=== BRICS ===
On 19 August 2024, it was announced that the EAEU would develop comprehensive dialogue with BRICS countries during a meeting in Nizhny Novgorod. Goar Barseghyan, Minister of Industry and Agriculture of the Eurasian Economic Commission, stated "The priority of the Eurasian Economic Union's further development is its positioning as a pole of economic attraction on the international stage. In this regard, it is very important for us to deepen cooperation with the BRICS countries in the real economy." The Minister also proposed to make the "EAEU – BRICS" discussion format as an annual platform for discussing relevant matters of industrial development.

=== Cambodia ===
In February 2017, Cambodia signed an agreement with the Eurasian Union with the aims of expanding trade cooperation between the two sides. The EAEU controls imports and exports to a market of almost 183 million people and Cambodia is hoping to boost bilateral trade with EAEU member states.

In September 2019, Cambodia launched negotiations to sign a free trade agreement with the EAEU during a meeting in Moscow.

=== Canada ===
In April 2015, the Canada-Russia-Eurasia Business Association stated that Canadian businesses are interested in cooperation with the Eurasian Economic Union. He said that the association would hold a seminar in Montreal on May 1 at which the ambassadors of Russia, Belarus, Kazakhstan and Armenia will speak. They will express their detailed view to the Canadian business community of the possible future cooperation between Canadian businesses and the EAEU.

=== Chile ===
Eurasian Union member-states and the Republic of Chile are thrashing out the issue of potential formation of a free trade zone. The last meeting of the joint commission was held in 2017 in Chile and was attended by business representatives from the EAEU states presenting their potential.

Another meeting of the joint commission will be held in 2019 as negotiations over a free trade zone are still ongoing.

=== China ===
In 2016, China, Russia and Mongolia officially signed plans to build an economic corridor. There is also steady progress with regard to synergizing the initiative with the Eurasian Economic Union and to deepen relations and cooperation between the Eurasian Union, China, and other BRICS member states.

On May 17, 2018, it was confirmed that China signed a trade and economic cooperation agreement with the Eurasian Economic Union in the Kazakh capital of Astana.

On April 26, 2019, the leaders of China and Russia called their countries “good friends” and vowed to work together in pursuing greater economic integration of Eurasia. On the sidelines of the Belt and Road Initiative Forum in Beijing, Chinese leader Xi Jinping and Russian president Vladimir Putin pledged to further strengthen economic and trade cooperation between the two sides. Vladimir Putin further stated that, "countries gathering under the Belt and Road Initiative and the EAEU share long-term strategic interests of peace and growth.”

In June 2019, Xi and Putin stated they were committed to the concept of building the “Great Eurasian Partnership”.

=== Denmark ===
In 2018, the Faroe Islands, an autonomous region of Denmark, signed a Memorandum of Understanding with the EEU. The MoU is designed to increase trade and cooperation between the two sides.

=== Ecuador ===
It is expected that Ecuador will sign a free trade deal with the EEU after a trade meeting was held between the Presidents of Ecuador and Belarus in the Ecuadorian capital Quito on February 12, 2015.

=== Egypt ===
In December 2016, the Presidents of Russia, Kazakhstan, Kyrgyzstan and Armenia approved proposals on the need to start talks on creation of a free trade zone between the Eurasian Economic Union and Egypt. On December 26, 2016, the President of Egypt confirmed the importance that Egypt assigns to the creation of a free trade area with EEU.

On November 18, 2018, Egypt and the Eurasian Union signed a framework document on the creation of a free trade agreement between the two sides in Cairo. Egypt's Minister of Trade and Industry, Amr Nassar stressed on the necessity to complete negotiations on a free trade agreement between Egypt and the Union's countries in 2019. The first round of official negotiations began on January 15, 2019. The second round of negotiations were held in Moscow on April 24, 2019.

=== European Union ===
In January 2019, a senior official from Kazakhstan called for greater cooperation between the Eurasian Economic Union and the European Union, ultimately aiming to create a single economic space from the Atlantic to the Pacific. The official stated that the EAEU is loosely modeled on the EU and that the EAEU had effectively become a common market with a population of more than 183 million people with growing trade turnovers between the members. In addition, the official said about 40 countries have officially expressed a desire to develop trade and economic cooperation with the EAEU. The official stated that the European Union and Eurasian Union's complementary economies and geographic proximity would allow them to create a free trade area stretching across Eurasia and that it would unlock powerful and unparalleled economic potential. However, he noted that this was a long-term goal as the EU's current relations with Russia, in particular, has deteriorated since the Annexation of Crimea. The spokesperson made clear that future relations between the two trade blocs depends on the deescalation of the situation in Eastern Ukraine.

In October 2019, during a meeting in Yerevan, President of Moldova Igor Dodon stated that he supported the creation of a free trade zone between the EU and the Eurasian Union. The President advised that Moldova can act as a bridge between the EU, Eurasian Union, Balkan states and CIS members.

In February 2020, Armenian prime minister Nikol Pashinyan met with President of the German Bundestag, Wolfgang Schäuble. The development of cooperation and partnership between the Eurasian Union and the European Union was discussed, during a meeting in Berlin.

=== Greece ===
On 24 June 2017, Greece and the Eurasian Union signed a joint statement of cooperation for expanding trade relations. A Greek-Eurasian Business Council was also established, which was the first of its kind between a European Union member state and the Eurasian Union.

In November 2019, the president of Greece, Prokopis Pavlopoulos met his Armenian counterpart in Yerevan. The Armenian president stated that Armenia can become a gateway for Greece to enter the Eurasian Union market.

=== India ===
In July 2016, negotiators from India and the Eurasian Union gathered to discuss next steps of a Free Trade Agreement. India aims to bolster commerce and investments with the Unions member states and hopes to complete the FTA by early 2017.

In September 2019, during the United Nations General Assembly in New York, the prime minister of India Narendra Modi held a meeting with Armenian prime minister Nikol Pashinyan. Prime Minister Modi sought Armenia's support for finalizing negotiations on a free trade deal between India and the Eurasian Union. In return, Prime Minister Pashinyan affirmed Armenia's support to concluding a trade agreement with India soon.

A free trade zone between India and the Eurasian Union is expected to be finalized in 2021.

=== Indonesia ===
In November 2016, Indonesian government officials explored the possibility of forging a Free Trade Agreement with the EAEU. The Trade Minister of Indonesia stated that his country would follow other ASEAN members like Vietnam and Singapore by establishing closer trade links and creating new economic opportunities with the Eurasian Union. The Minister hopes to begin talks during the next ASEAN-Russia Summit.

On 14 February 2019, Indonesia and the Eurasian Union signed a memorandum of cooperation with the hopes of turning the memorandum into a free trade agreement after more in-depth talks between Indonesia and EEU member states.

=== Iran ===
Iran has expressed interest in signing a trade agreement with the EEU. During a meeting between Kazakh President Nursultan Nazarbayev and Iranian President Hassan Rouhani, they discussed the prospect of corporation between the customs union and Iran. According to the Iranian Ambassador based in Russia, Mehdi Sanaei, Iran is focusing on signing an agreement with the EEU in 2015 regarding mutual trade and reduction of import tariffs to central Asian countries and trading in national currencies as part of the agreement rather than in USD (US dollars).

In December 2016, the Armenian president, Serzh Sargsyan, stated that Armenia is actively supporting the process of negotiations between the Eurasian Economic Commission and Iran striving to sign a Free Trade Agreement as soon as possible. His proposition comes about a week after Iranian president Hassan Rouhani's official visit to Yerevan, where discussion took place on the deepening of trade and economic relations between the EEU and Iran.

In March 2017, the prime ministers of the EEU signed a directive ordering preparations for an agreement on forming a Free-trade zone with Iran, during a meeting in the Kyrgyz capital of Bishkek. According to Russia's Energy Minister Aleksandr Novak, the agreement could be finalised by May 2018.

On May 17, 2018, it was confirmed that Iran has signed an agreement to enter a three-year provisional free trade agreement with the EEU, according to EEC official Tigran Sargsyan.

The provisional agreement would have expired at the end of October 2022, but was extended for three years on March 14, 2022.

The full Free Trade Agreement was signed on December 25, 2023.

=== Israel ===
In October 2016, Russian ambassador to Armenia Ivan Volynkin said that the signing of a trade deal between Russia and Israel, one similar to between Russia and Vietnam, was being discussed. Official negotiations with the EAEU were launched in Moscow in April 2018 and in October 2018, a second round of negotiations were held in Jerusalem; where the parties had “a substantive discussion of the main sections of the draft agreement,” and noted that the third round of talks are set to take place in late February or early March 2019 in one of the EAEU member states. Early in 2019, both Russian and Israeli officials confirmed that negotiations towards Israel's signature of a free trade agreement with the EEU were nearing completion, pending one final round of talks.

Negotiations of a free trade zone between Israel and the Eurasian Union may conclude in 2021.

=== Japan ===
The possibility of establishing a free trade zone between Japan and the Eurasian Union will be discussed in the nearest future, Russian President Vladimir Putin said during a Russian-Japanese Business Dialogue meeting in December 2016.

=== Jordan ===
In September 2017, Jordan and the Eurasian Union signed a memorandum of understanding to boost and diversify trade between Jordan the Eurasian Union in Amman. Meanwhile, Russian officials gave their support to establishing a free trade zone agreement with Jordan.

=== Lebanon ===
On 12 March 2018, Armenia discussed the potential for Lebanon to access larger markets within the EAEU during a meeting between the Lebanese and Armenian prime ministers in Beirut.

=== MERCOSUR ===
Mercosur is the South American trade bloc that unites Argentina, Bolivia, Brazil, Paraguay, Uruguay and Venezuela. In April 2016, the Eurasian Economic Commission held a working meeting between the chairman of the Eurasian Economic Commission Tigran Sargsyan and the Minister of Foreign Affairs of the Argentine Republic. The parties discussed the developing relations between the Eurasian Union and Argentina as well as developing closer ties between the member states of MERCOSUR and the EAEU. A draft memorandum of future cooperation on trade and economic issues had been sent to MERCOSUR for consideration.

In December 2018, the presidents of Mercosur countries signed a Memorandum for Cooperation on trade and economic issues with the Eurasian Union during a meeting in Montevideo.

=== Mexico ===
Foreign Minister of Mexico, Luis Videgaray Caso stated that Mexico considers a cooperation agreement between the Eurasian Union and the Pacific Alliance, which unites Colombia, Chile and Peru, of high importance. He stated that he would hold discussions with Russia's Foreign Ministry on establishing relations between Mexico, the Pacific Alliance and the Eurasian Union.

=== Mongolia ===
In February 2017, the prime minister of Mongolia stated that bilateral relations have been dynamically developing and that Mongolia is prepared to establish a joint working group for establishing a Free Trade Agreement with the EAEU.

=== Morocco ===
Morocco and the Eurasian Economic Commission signed September 28, 2017 in Rabat, an economic cooperation memorandum to strengthen relations between the two sides.

"This memorandum on cooperation between Morocco and the EEC will make it possible to formalize relations between the two parties," Minister in charge of Integration and Macroeconomics at the EEC, Tatyana Valovaya, said following talks with Minister of Foreign Affairs and International Cooperation, Nasser Bourita.

Under the agreement, a joint group will be set up to discuss issues relating to economic cooperation between Morocco and the EEC, she added, noting that the Eurasian Economic Community, is a market of 180 million people.

In his turn, Bourita said that the signing of this agreement is part of the diversification of partnerships between Morocco and regional groupings, in accordance with the high royal guidelines.

Morocco, which has bilateral relations with the countries of the EEC, aims to increase its exports with this economic grouping, particularly in the agricultural sector, he stressed.

The EEC had signed partnerships with other countries, which shows that it sees Morocco as a "credible partner and a gateway" to Africa and other regions with whom the Kingdom enjoys excellent relations, he said.

=== New Zealand ===
In August 2016, Russian foreign minister Sergei Lavrov held talks in Moscow with his counterpart from New Zealand. The formation of a free trade zone between New Zealand and the Eurasian Union meets the interests of New Zealand's producers and there is hope that this project will be brought to the table once again in the future.

=== Pakistan ===
In June 2017, Pakistan had accepted Russia's proposal to enter into a bilateral Free Trade Agreement. Russia also expressed support for Pakistan's possible future inclusion in the Eurasian Economic Union.

=== Peru ===
On 23 April 2016, Peru and the Eurasian Union agreed to bolster trade exchanges during a meeting in Lima. The Eurasian Union also signed a memorandum of cooperation with the Andean Community of nations.

=== Philippines ===
In May 2016, Philippine ambassador to Russia Carlos Sorreta responded positively to Russia's calls for tighter relations and economic links between the EEU and the Philippines. Some Russian analysts argue that the Philippines could be the key in Moscow's ambition to forge a free trade agreement between the Eurasian Economic Union (EEU) and the ASEAN bloc. This idea has gained positive feedback from Philippine policymakers.

=== Serbia ===
In November 2016, the Serbian foreign minister said Serbia plans on signing an integrated agreement with the Russia-led Eurasian Economic Union. The Minister added that Serbia is now planning to sign a common agreement which will be good for all members of the EAEU.

In January 2019, Serbia began negotiations regarding the finalization of Serbia's Free Trade Agreement with the Eurasian Union. The trade ministers of Serbia and the Eurasian Union agreed on 6 June in Saint Petersburg that a free trade agreement between Serbia and the EAEU would be signed on 1 October 2019 in Sochi.

=== Shanghai Cooperation Organisation ===
On 30 May 2024, the EEU and the Shanghai Cooperation Organisation discussed areas of cooperation during a meeting in Beijing. Sergei Glazyev, Minister of Integration and Macroeconomics stated "The EEU is rising to a new level of development in light of adopting the Declaration on further development of economic processes within the Eurasian Economic Union until 2030 and for the period until 2045 "The Eurasian Economic Path". I am pleased to emphasize that the SCO is one of the key international partners in all the EEC strategic documents."

=== Singapore ===
In May 2016, Prime Minister of Singapore witnessed the signing of a Memorandum of Understanding between Singapore and the Eurasian Union. The move was aimed at bolstering economic ties and closer collaboration. The Prime Minister called the agreement a positive and concrete step towards deepening and widening engagement.

On 24 January 2019, Deputy Prime Minister of Singapore Tharman Shanmugaratnam met with Armenian prime minister Nikol Pashinyan during the World Economic Forum in Davos, Switzerland and discussed the importance of finalizing a Free Trade Agreement between Singapore and the Eurasian Union in the coming year.

On 2 October 2019, Singapore and the Eurasian Union finalized and signed a Free Trade Agreement in Yerevan. The prime minister of Singapore hailed the agreement as a success to free trade and multilateralism. The Prime Minister also hoped that ASEAN and the Eurasian Union would sign a similar deal as both trade blocs together comprise 800 million people, which would unlock multiple opportunities and economic growth.

=== South Korea ===
In February 2017, the government of South Korea announced that it will begin seeking Free Trade Agreements with entities like Mercosur and the Eurasian Economic Union as a way to boost economic growth and cooperation.

=== Thailand ===
Thailand has confirmed its interest in creating a free trade zone with the Eurasian Economic Union. In July 2015, the Thai government was reportedly working on the final stages of an agreement. Russian prime minister Dmitry Medvedev stated that the EEU was already holding talks with over 40 countries interested in establishing trade links. He added that Russia was also working on a possible future currency union with other members of the Eurasian Economic Union.

=== Tunisia ===
In August 2016, the ambassador of Tunisia to Russia stated that Tunisia was prepared to sign a trade deal with the Eurasian Union to boost trade prospects. The Ambassador said much progress was made over the past year to create a special economic zone.

=== Vietnam ===
In October 2016, a Free Trade Agreement between the Eurasian Union and Vietnam came into effect. This formal declaration signals the EEU's burgeoning interest to further economic ties with Asia-Pacific, in particular, with ASEAN members. The agreement will open Vietnam to a market of 183 million people. Cambodia and Thailand are also reportedly in talks to deepen trade relations with the EEU.

== See also ==
- Customs Union of the Eurasian Economic Union
- Enlargement of the European Union
  - Potential enlargement of the European Union
