= Zoran D. Nikolić =

Serbian politician

Zoran D. Nikolić (Serbian Cyrillic: Зоран Д. Николић; born 1958) is a politician in Serbia. He was a member of the National Assembly of Serbia from 1993 to 2004 and briefly served as a justice minister in Serbia's transitional government after the fall of Slobodan Milošević. He later became the mayor of Kovin and is now a member of Kovin's municipal assembly. Nikolić has been a member of the Socialist Party of Serbia (Socijalistička partija Srbije, SPS) for most of his political career.

== Early life and private career ==
Nikolić was born in Kovin, Autonomous Province of Vojvodina, in what was then the People's Republic of Serbia in the Federal People's Republic of Yugoslavia. He graduated from the University of Belgrade Faculty of Law and worked for a time as a judge overseeing misdemeanour offences.

== Politician ==
=== National Assembly of Serbia (1992–2004) ===
==== The Milošević Years (1992–2000) ====
Nikolić received the ninth position on the Socialist Party's electoral list for Zrenjanin in the 1992 Serbian parliamentary election. The list won eight seats, and he was included in his party's delegation when the assembly convened in early 1993. (From 1992 to 2000, Serbia's electoral law stipulated that one-third of parliamentary mandates would be assigned to candidates on successful lists in numerical order, while the remaining two-thirds would be distributed amongst other candidates at the discretion of sponsoring parties or coalitions. Nikolić's comparatively low position on the list did not prevent him from receiving a mandate.) The Socialists won a plurality victory in the election and initially governed in a sort of informal alliance with the far-right Serbian Radical Party (Srpska radikalna stranka, SRS). This alliance broke down later in the year, and a new election was called for late 1993.

Nikolić appeared in the eleventh position on the SPS's list for Zrenjanin in 1993 and was awarded a mandate for a second term when the list won ten seats. The Socialists increased their seat total in this election and afterward formed a new administration with New Democracy (Nova Demokratija, ND). Nikolić again served as a government supporter and became chair of the assembly's legislative committee.

For the 1997 parliamentary election, Nikolić was given the second position on the Socialist Party's list for the new, smaller Pančevo division and was re-elected when the list won four seats. The SPS won a third consecutive plurality victory (in conjunction with its allies) and formed a new government in early 1998 with the SRS and the Yugoslav Left (Jugoslovenska Levica, JUL). Nikolić once again served as a government supporter and chaired the legislative committee.

==== After the Fall of Milošević (2000–04) ====
SPS leader Slobodan Milošević was defeated by Vojislav Koštunica of the Democratic Opposition of Serbia (Demokratska opozicija Srbije, DOS) in the 2000 Yugoslavian presidential election, a watershed moment in Serbian and Yugoslavian politics. The government of Serbia fell shortly thereafter, and a provisional government was formed pending a new republican election; the DOS, SPS, and Serbian Renewal Movement (Srpski pokret obnove, SPO), all participated in the administration. The justice department was overseen by three ministers, one from each political entity; Nikolić was chosen as the SPS's representative. In October 2000, all three co-ministers met with the United Nations High Commissioner for Human Rights to discuss the topics of persons from Kosovo and Metohija being held in Serbia's penal institutions and non-Albanians who had disappeared from the province during the recent Kosovo War. The following month, Nikolić successfully negotiated with inmates who had taken over a Niš prison to permit the return of guards to the institution. During his time as a cabinet minister, Nikolić was also commissioner for the South Banat District.

Serbia's electoral system was reformed for the 2000 parliamentary election, such that the entire country became a single electoral division and all mandates were awarded to candidates on successful lists at the discretion of the sponsoring parties or coalitions, irrespective of numerical order. Nikolić received the 155th position on the SPS's list (which was largely alphabetical) and was awarded a mandate for a fourth term when the list won thirty-seven seats. The DOS won a landslide majority in this election, the SPS served for the first time in opposition. Nikolić's term as a cabinet minister ended when a new administration was formed on 25 January 2001.

The SPS experienced a serious split in 2002, with several dissident members ultimately forming the breakaway Socialist People's Party (Socijalistička Narodna Stranka, SNS). Nikolić was among the more prominent figures to join the new party.

During his final term in the national assembly, Nikolić was a member of the legislative committee, the committee on constitutional affairs, the committee on justice and administration, the administrative committee, and the committee on defence and security. He was nominated to a lustration committee addressing human rights violations of the previous administration, but he declined to serve.

He appeared in the fifth position on the Socialist People's Party list in the 2003 parliamentary election. The list did not cross the electoral threshold, and his mandate ended when the new assembly convened in early 2004.

=== Local politics (2013–present) ===
Nikolić later rejoined the SPS and has become a prominent figure in the local politics of Kovin.

Serbia's electoral system was reformed again in 2011, such that all mandates were awarded to candidates on successful lists in numerical order. Nikolić was given the third position on the SPS's list for the Kovin municipal assembly in the 2013 Serbian local elections and was elected when the list won six out of forty-five seats. The Serbian Progressive Party (Srpska napredna stranka, SNS) won a majority victory in the election, and the Socialists initially served in opposition. The local Progressive organization subsequently become divided, however, and there were several changes over the municipality's government in the next four years. In June 2015, Nikolić became mayor in an administration that included the SPS, the Democratic Party (Demokratska Stranka, DS), the Alliance of Vojvodina Hungarians (Vajdasági Magyar Szövetség, VMSZ), and dissident members of the Progressives. This alliance did not remain intact for long, and the Progressives returned to office in September of the same year.

Nikolić appeared in the forty-sixth position on the SPS's list in the 2016 Vojvodina provincial election; the list won twelve seats, and he was not elected. He later appeared in the first position on the party's list for Kovin in the 2017 Serbian local elections and was re-elected when the list won seven seats. The Progressives formed a new administration with the Socialists after the election, and Nikolić was appointed as deputy mayor. He served in this role for three years, and in February 2000 he was appointed to a provisional administration that governed the municipality pending early elections.

He again led the SPS list for Kovin in the 2020 Serbian local elections and was re-elected when the list won nine seats. As of 2022, he continues to serve in the local assembly.
