= Noz =

Noz may refer to:

- NOz, certain types of nitrogen oxide
- Bugul Noz (night shepherd), a night creature in Breton mythology
- Fest Noz (night festival), a traditional Breton festival
- Nayi language (ISO 639:noz), spoken in western Ethiopia
- Neue Osnabrücker Zeitung, a German newspaper
- Spichenkovo Airport (IATA: NOZ), in Kemerovo Oblast, Russia

== See also ==
- Nož (disambiguation)
