= Serbian nationalism =

Assertion that Serbs are a nation and promotes the cultural unity of Serbs

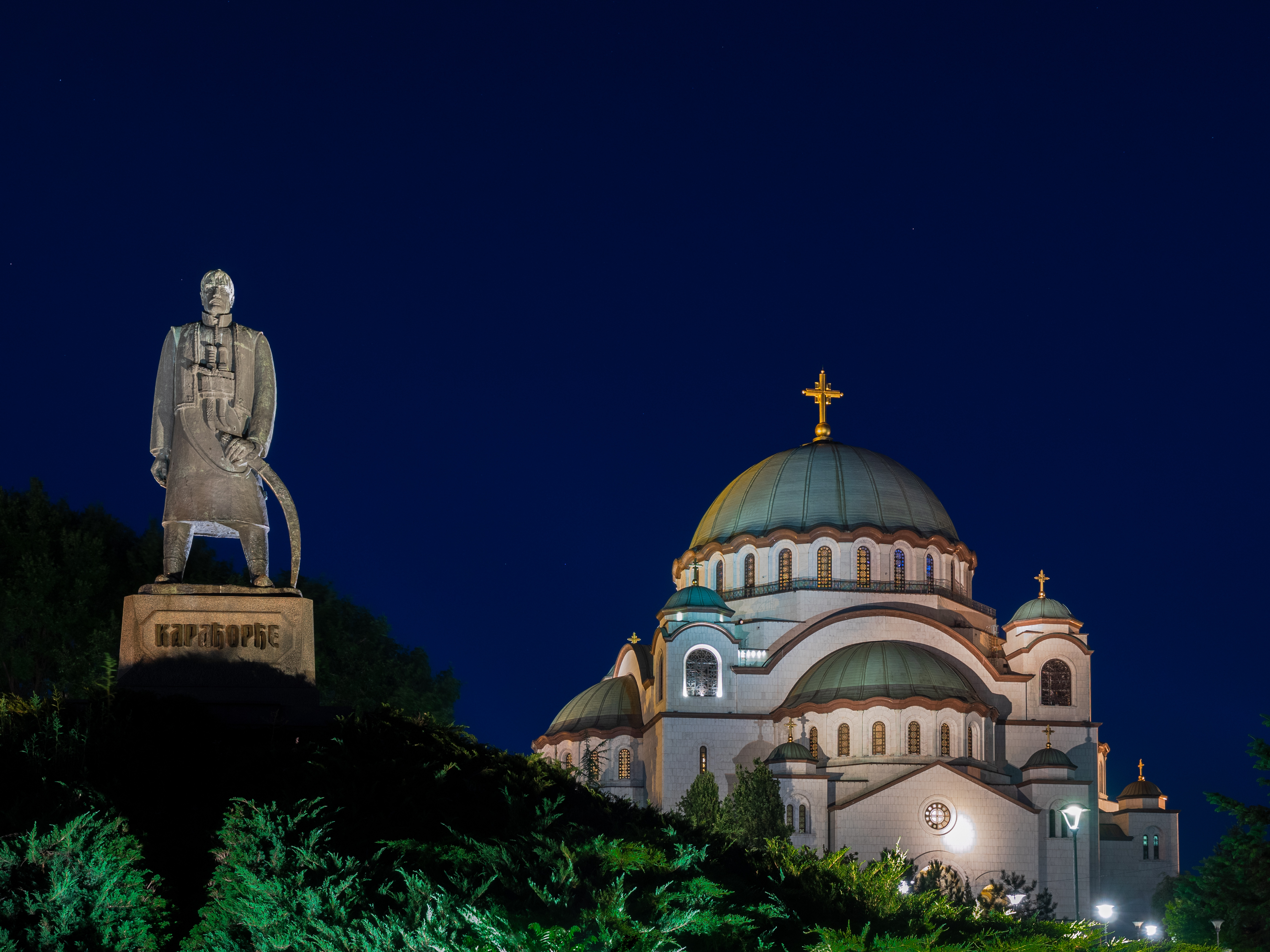
Monument to Karađorđe and Church of Saint Sava in Belgrade

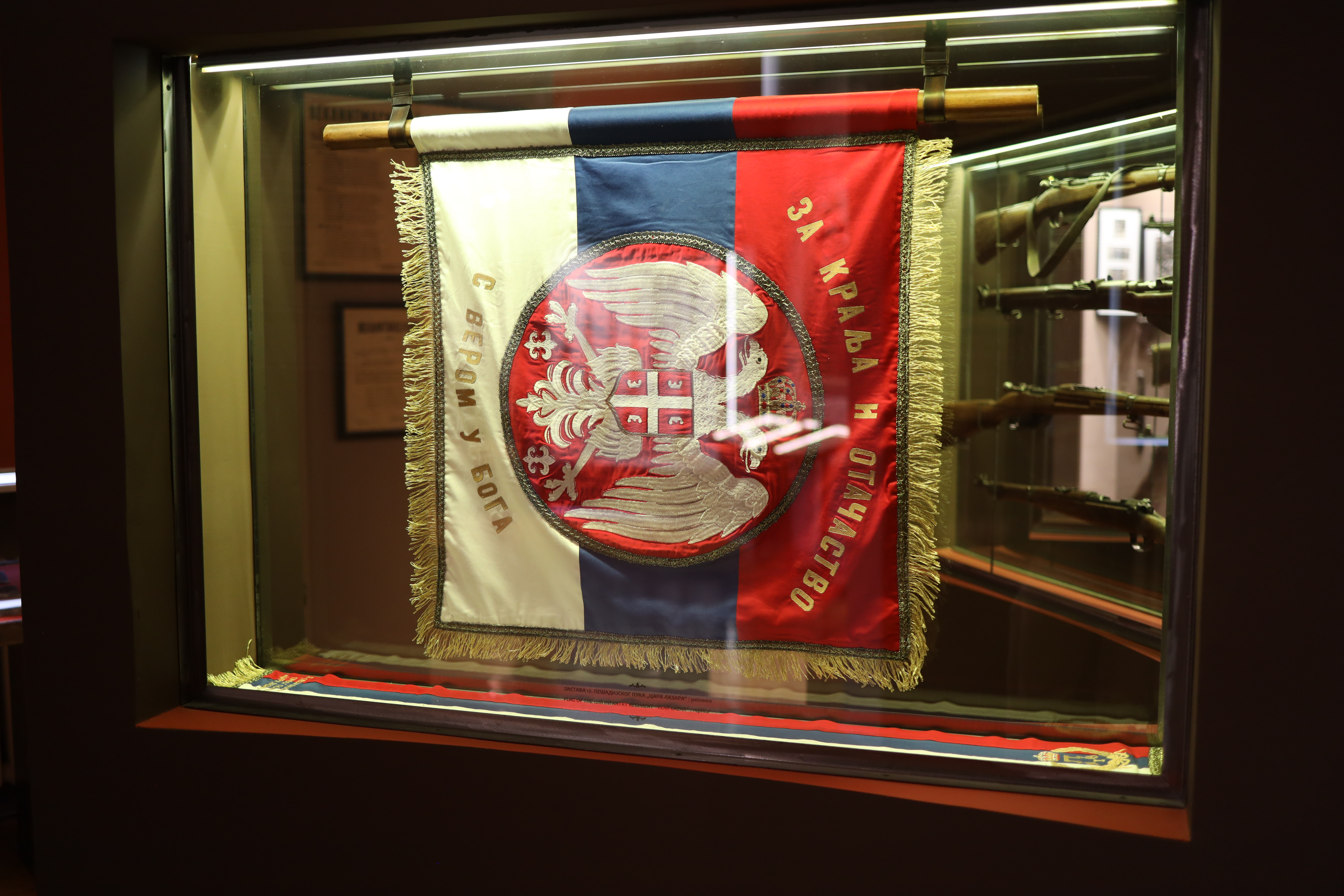
Historic Serbian Army standard bearing the coat of arms and tricolour flag of the Kingdom of Serbia.

Serbian nationalism (Serbian: Српски национализам, romanized: Srpski nacionalizam) asserts that Serbs are a nation and promotes the cultural and political unity of Serbs. It is an ethnic nationalism, originally arising in the context of the general rise of nationalism in the Balkans under Ottoman rule, under the influence of Serbian linguist Vuk Stefanović Karadžić and Serbian statesman Ilija Garašanin. Serbian nationalism was an important factor during the Balkan Wars which contributed to the decline of the Ottoman Empire, during and after World War I when it contributed to the dissolution of the Austro-Hungarian Empire, and again during the breakup of Yugoslavia and the Yugoslav Wars of the 1990s.

After 1878, Serbian nationalists merged their goals with those of Yugoslavists, and emulated Piedmont's leading role in the Risorgimento of Italy, by claiming that Serbia sought not only to unite all Serbs in one state, but that Serbia intended to be a South Slavic Piedmont that would unite all South Slavs in one state known as Yugoslavia. Serbian nationalists supported a centralized Yugoslav state that guaranteed the unity of the Serbs while resisting efforts to decentralize the state. The Vidovdan Constitution adopted by Yugoslavia in 1921 consolidated the country as a centralized state under the Serbian Karađorđević monarchy. Croatian nationalists opposed the centralized state and demanded decentralization and an autonomous Croatia within Yugoslavia, which was accepted by the Yugoslav government in the Cvetković–Maček Agreement of 1939. Serbian nationalists opposed the agreement on the grounds that it weakened the unity of Serbdom, asserting its importance to Yugoslavia with the slogan "Strong Serbdom, Strong Yugoslavia". The invasion and partition of Yugoslavia in World War II resulted in violent ethnic conflict between nationalist Serbs, Croats, Bosniaks, and others, resulting in a highly violent sectarian variant of Serbian nationalism rising in the Chetnik movement.

The decentralization of the Socialist Federal Republic of Yugoslavia in the 1960s and the suppression of all ethnic nationalist sentiments led to a Serbian nationalist backlash and resurgence in the 1980s, that condemned post-World War II Yugoslavism and the decentralization of Yugoslavia. Upon Yugoslavia collapsing in the 1990s with multiple republics seeking secession, Serbian nationalists demanded that all Serbs in all the Yugoslav republics had the right to be united in a common state. Ethnic conflict occurred between Serbs seeking unity with Serbia and other Yugoslav ethnicities seeking independence.

== History ==
=== Serbian Revolution ===
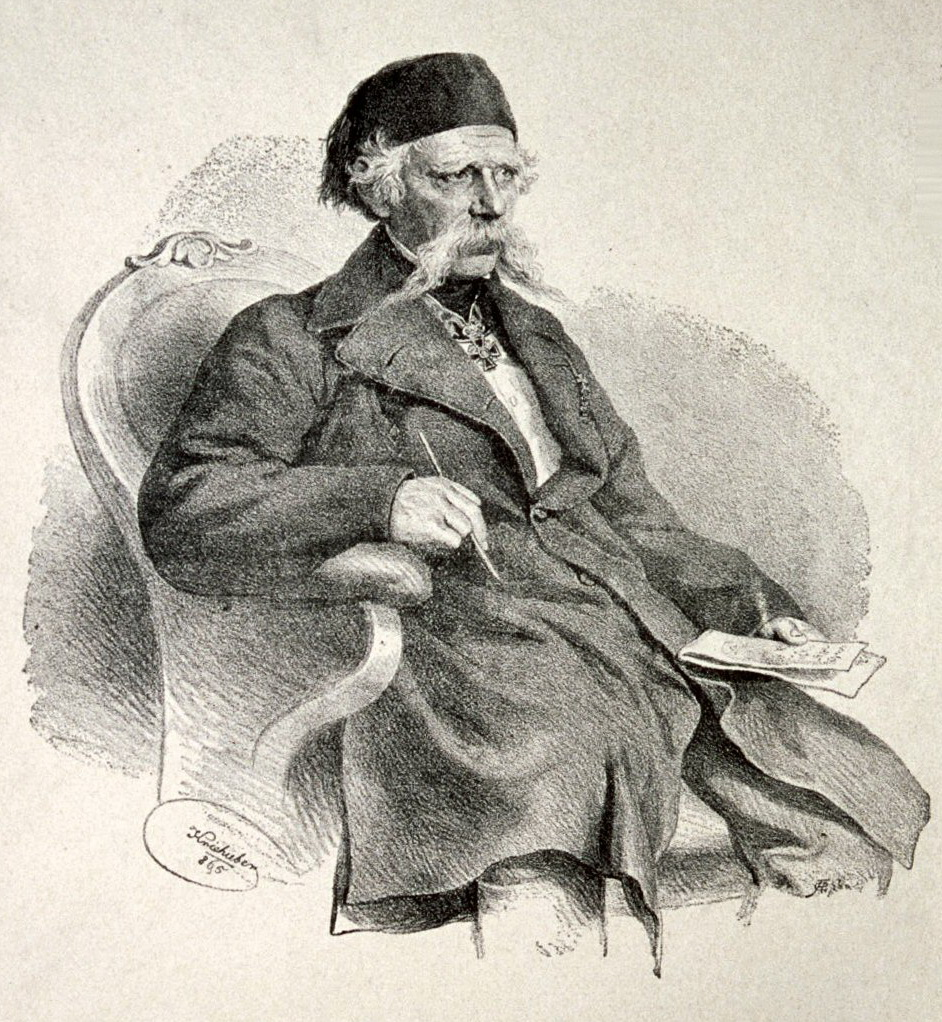
Vuk Karadžić, Serbian linguist.

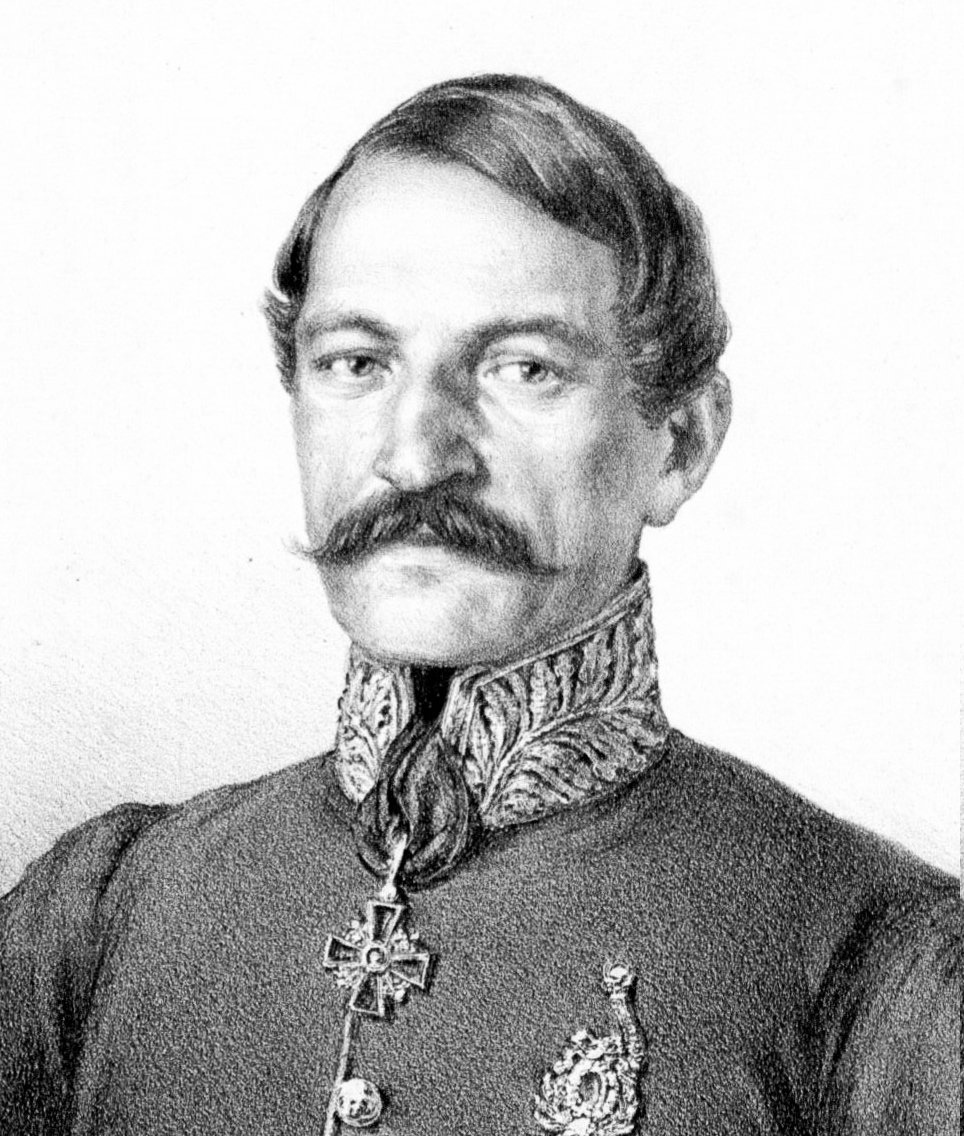
Ilija Garašanin, Serbian statesman.

The origins of Serbian nationalism date back to the 19th century, beginning with the 1804 uprisings by Serbs against Ottoman rule that eventually led to the creation of an independent Serbian state in 1878. However, Serbian nationalists themselves cite the origins of the movement as being the Battle of Kosovo on the Serbian national and religious holiday Vidovdan in 1389 between Serbia and the Ottoman Empire, the battle that holds important symbolic meaning to Serbian nationalists. The Serbian linguist Vuk Stefanović Karadžić is considered by some authors to be the father of Serbian nationalism. Karadžić created a linguistic definition of the Serbs that included all speakers of the Štokavian dialect regardless of their religious affiliation or geographical origin. However, Karadžić acknowledged the right of some Štokavian-speaking peoples to call themselves names other than Serbs. German historian Michael Weithmann considers Karadžić's theory that all southern Slavs are Serbs as a "dangerous political and ideological idea in scientific shape" while Czech historian Jan Rychlik considers Karadžić to have been a "propagator of greater Serbian ideology". Ilija Garašanin was another early proponent of Serbian nationalism and a proponent of a Greater Serbia - a Serbian state whose borders were extended to include all Serbs in the Balkan region. A clerical support to Greater Serbian ideology was provided by Nikodim Milaš in his writings of Pravoslavna Dalmacija (1901).

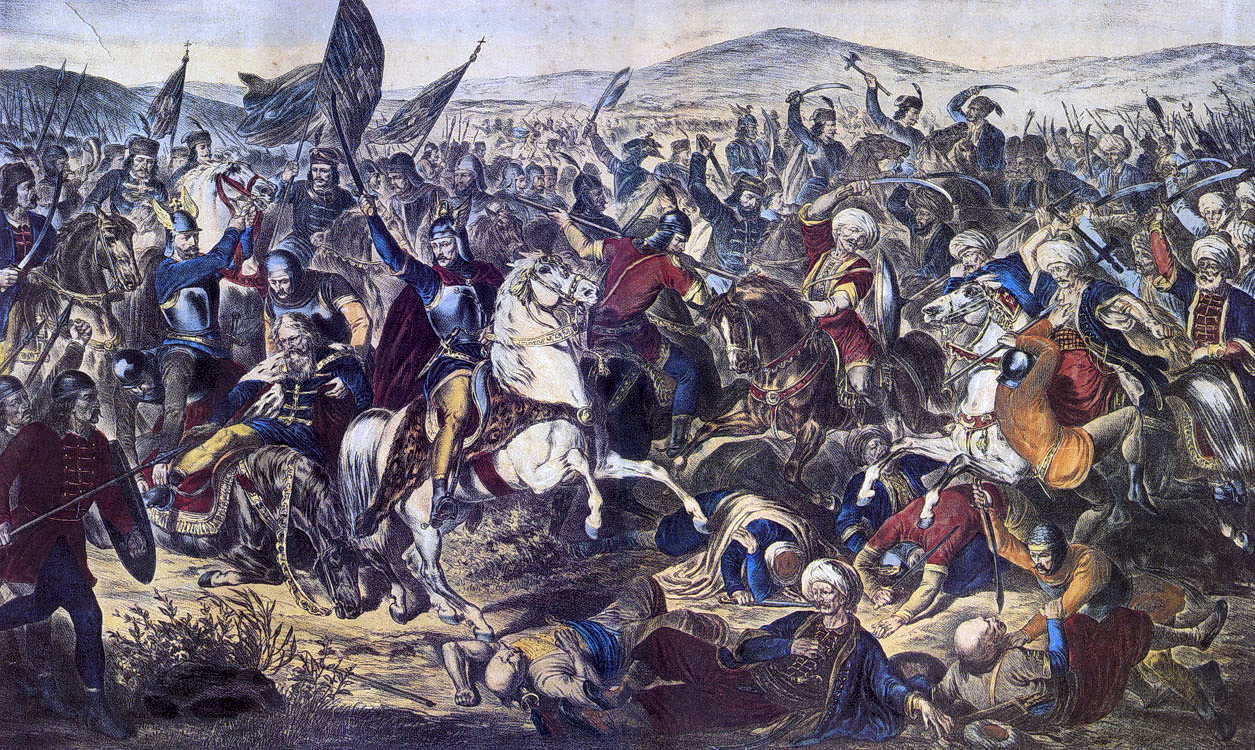
Battle of Kosovo (1870), painting by Adam Stefanović, a depiction of the Battle of Kosovo of 1389

After Serbia was recognized as an independent state in 1878, both South Slavs and the Serbian government considered their peoples in Habsburg-ruled Austria-Hungary to be under occupation, resulting in increasing antagonism between Serbia and Austria-Hungary from the late 19th century to the early 20th century.

=== World War I ===
In 1914 Austrian Archduke Franz Ferdinand was assassinated by Bosnian Serb revolutionary Gavrilo Princip, resulting in Austria-Hungary accusing Serbia of involvement and subsequently declaring war on Serbia, resulting in a clash of alliances and the eruption of World War I. In spite of heavy casualties, Serbia benefited from Allies' victory against Germany and Austria-Hungary, with Serbia subsequently joining with territories claimed by Yugoslav nationalists to form the Kingdom of Serbs, Croats, and Slovenes, informally known as Yugoslavia, in 1918. Serbian nationalists associated with a centralist vision of Yugoslavia as opposed to a confederal or federal state as advocated by non-Serbs. The antagonism between a centralized Yugoslavia supported by Serbian nationalists and a decentralized Yugoslavia supported by Croatian and Slovenian nationalists was the main cause of unstable governance in Yugoslavia during the interwar period.

=== Yugoslavia ===
In 1920, the centralized vision of Yugoslavia as supported by Serbian nationalists was enacted in the Constitution of the Kingdom of Serbs, Croats, and Slovenes passed on Serbian national and religious holiday Vidovdan that became known as the "Vidovdan Constitution" (Serbian: Видовдански устав, Vidovdanski ustav). Antagonism which rose between Serbian nationalists versus Croatian and Slovenian nationalists culminated in the 1928 assassination of Stjepan Radić on the floor of the Yugoslav parliament and the subsequent deterioration of parliamentary democracy in the country. In the aftermath King Alexander discarded the Vidovdan Constitution, proclaimed a royal dictatorship, and officially renamed the country Kingdom of Yugoslavia. King Alexander pursued a policy of encouraging modern Yugoslav nationalism which caused dissatisfaction amongst Serbian nationalists who saw Yugoslav nationalism as a disavowal of Serbian nationalism. Serbian nationalists were outraged at the Cvetković–Maček Agreement between Serb and Croat political leaders that created the Banovina of Croatia, an autonomous province within the kingdom which gave Croatia virtual autonomy. In response, Serbian nationalists founded the Serb Cultural Club which attacked the new Yugoslav nationalism under the motto of "Strong Serbdom, Strong Yugoslavia".

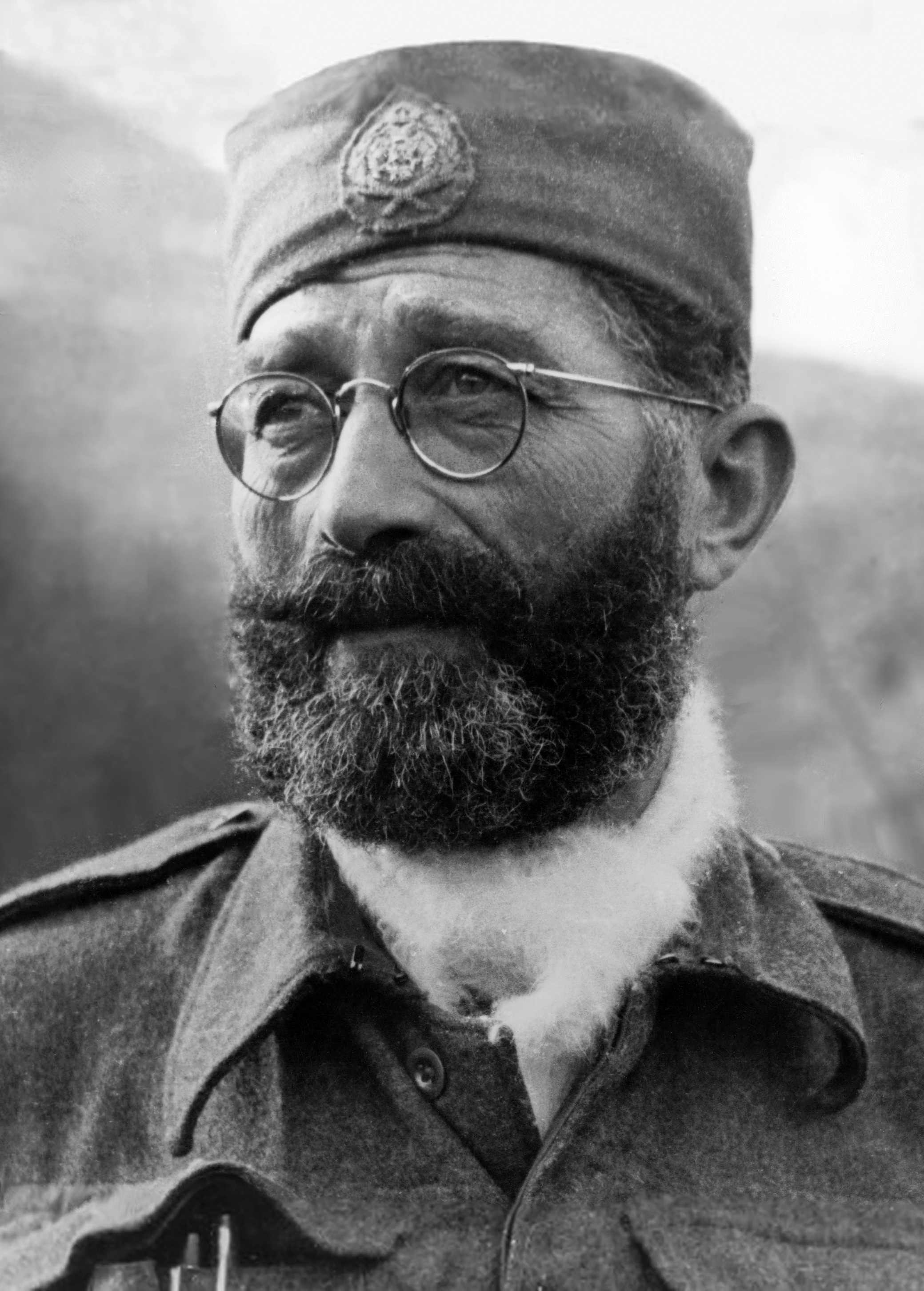
Draža Mihailović, Yugoslav Serb general

Yugoslavia was invaded and occupied by the Axis powers during World War II, with Nazi Germany establishing puppet states throughout occupied Yugoslavia. Serbian nationalism rose in a militant response by the Chetnik forces of Draža Mihailović against both the Axis forces and the communist Yugoslav Partisans. The war saw the rise of an extreme anti-Muslim variant of Serbian nationalism practised by the Chetniks who massacred Bosnian Muslims during the war.

In the aftermath of World War II and the seizure of power by the Yugoslav Partisans, Josip Broz Tito's communist Yugoslavia was established. The new regime repressed nationalism of any culture that was deemed to be a threat to the state. Serbian nationalism then developed during the 1960s by intellectuals such as Dobrica Ćosić and challenged the state-sponsored policies of Yugoslavism and "Brotherhood and Unity". Tito's later expulsion of the nationalist-leaning Serbian communist official Aleksandar Ranković in the 1960s was perceived as an attack on Serbian nationalism. After the ousting of Ranković, Serbian nationalist intellectuals increasingly began viewing Yugoslavia as a detrimental experience for the Serb nation.

=== Breakup of Yugoslavia and Yugoslav Wars ===
Serbian nationalism escalated following the death of Tito in 1980. Serbian intellectuals began breaking a number of taboos—for example, Branko Petranović identified Mihailović, the Chetnik rival of Tito during World War II as being an important "anti-fascist". Dobrica Ćosić joined other Serb political writers in writing the highly controversial Memorandum of the Serbian Academy of Sciences and Arts of 1986. The Memorandum claimed to promote solutions to restore Yugoslav unity, but it focused on fiercely condemning Titoist Yugoslavia of having economically subjugated Serbia to Croatia and Slovenia and accused ethnic Albanians of committing genocide against Serbs in Kosovo. The Memorandum was harshly condemned by the ruling League of Communists of Yugoslavia as well as the government of Serbia led by Ivan Stambolić. Members who would later support Serbian nationalism chose follow the party line and denounced the Memorandum as well. Slobodan Milošević, at the time a Serbian communist official, did not speak publicly about the issue, but in a meeting with members of the secret police he formally endorsed the official government denouncement of the Memorandum, stating:

The appearance of the Memorandum of the Serbian Academy of Arts and Sciences represents nothing else but the darkest nationalism. It means the liquidation of the current socialist system of our country, that is the disintegration after which there is no survival for any nation or nationality. ... Tito's policy of brotherhood and unity ... is the only basis on which Yugoslavia’s survival can be secured.

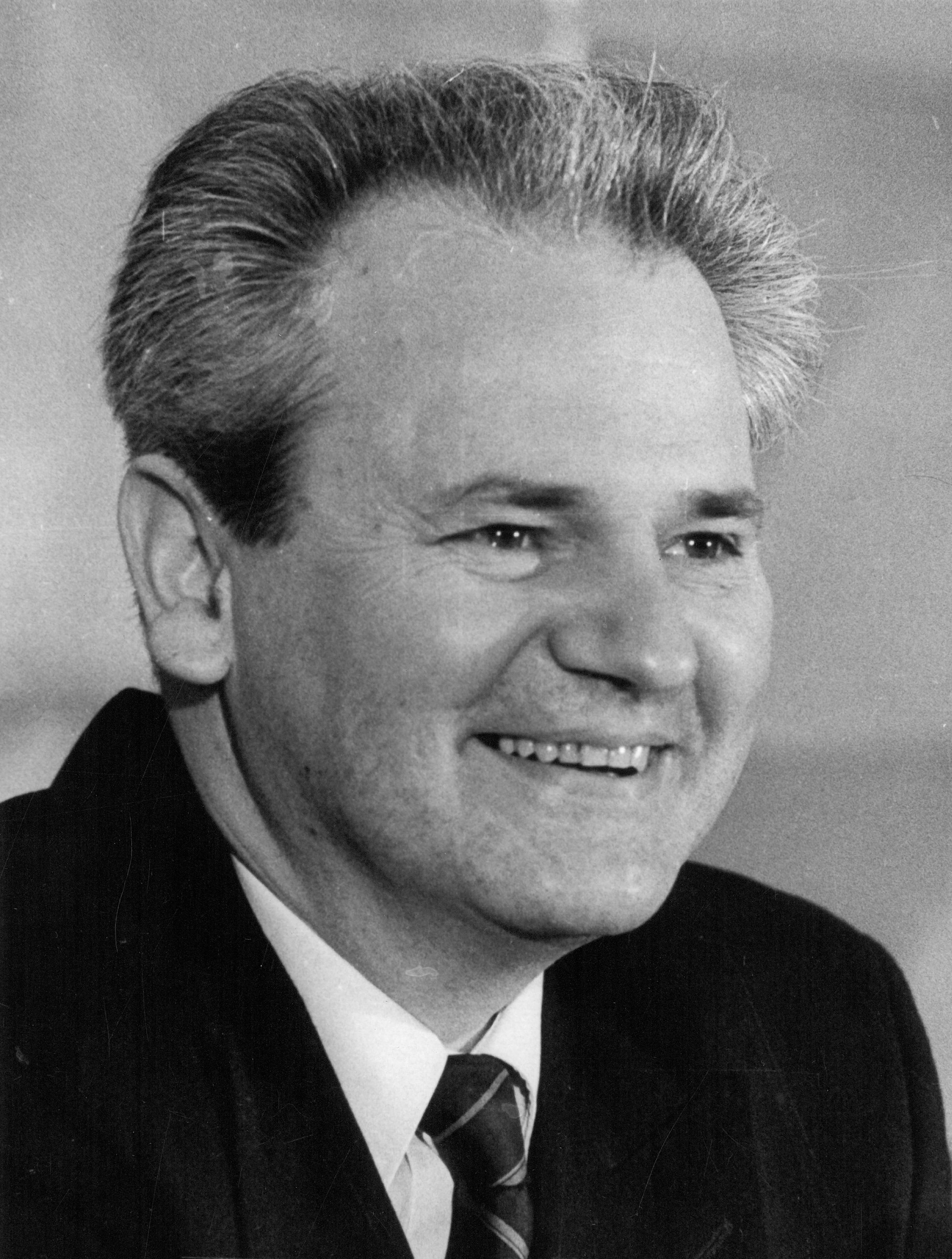
Slobodan Milošević

However, amidst the rising nationalist sentiment in Serbia in 1987, Milošević became their major spokesperson in the communist establishment. Milošević supported the premises of the Memorandum that included promoting centralization of power in the federal Yugoslav government to decrease the powers of the republics and autonomous provinces and a nationalist motto of "strong Serbia, strong Yugoslavia". During the Anti-Bureaucratic Revolution, Milošević urged Serbians and Montenegrins to "take to the streets" and utilized the slogan "Strong Serbia, Strong Yugoslavia" that drew support from Serbs but alienated Bosnian Muslims, Croats, Kosovo Albanians, Macedonians, and Slovenes. To these groups, Milošević's agenda reminded them of the Serb hegemonic political affairs of the Kingdom of Yugoslavia and Ranković's policies.

Milošević and his supporters appealed to nationalist and populist passion by speaking of Serbia's importance to the world and using aggressive and violent political rhetoric, in a Belgrade speech on 19 November 1988, he spoke of Serbia as facing battles against both internal and external enemies. In Vojvodina, pro-Milošević demonstrators that included 500 Kosovo Serbs and local Serbs demonstrated at the provincial capital, accusing the leadership in Vojvodina of supporting separatism and for being "traitors". In August 1988, meetings by supporters of the Anti-Bureaucratic Revolution were held in many locations in Serbia and Montenegro, with increasingly violent nature, with calls being heard such as "Give us arms!", "We want weapons!", "Long live Serbia—death to Albanians!", and "Montenegro is Serbia!". In the same month, Milošević began efforts designed to destabilize the governments in Montenegro and Bosnia-Herzegovina to allow him to install his followers in those republics. By 1989, Milošević and his supporters controlled Central Serbia along with the autonomous provinces of Kosovo and Vojvodina, supporters in the leadership of Montenegro, and agents of the Serbian security service were pursuing efforts to destabilize the government in Bosnia & Herzegovina. In 1989, Serbian media began to speak of "the alleged imperilment of the Serbs of Bosnia and Herzegovina", as tensions between Serbs and Bosnian Muslims and Croats increased over Serbs' support for Milošević. Efforts to spread the cult of personality of Milošević into the republic of Macedonia began in 1989 with slogans, graffiti, and songs glorifying Milošević spreading in the republic. Furthermore, Milošević proposed a law to restore land titles held by Serbs in the interwar period that effectively provided a legal basis for large numbers of Serbs to move to Kosovo and Macedonia to regain those lands while displacing the Albanian residents there. Beginning in 1989, Milošević had given support to Croatian Serbs who were vouching for the creation of an autonomous province for Croatia's Serbs that was opposed by Croatia's communist authorities.

In the late 1980s Milošević allowed the mobilization of Serb nationalist organizations to go unhindered by actions from the Serbian government, with Chetniks holding demonstrations, and the Serbian government embraced the Serbian Orthodox Church and restored its legitimacy in Serbia. In the media started to be popularized Serbian Church, and the idea that the Orthodoxy was "the spiritual basis for and most essential component of the national identity [of Serbs]". In that regard, were re-published Nikodim Milaš's Pravoslavna Dalmacija (1901) and Radoslav Grujić's Pravoslavna Srpska Crkva (1921), pseudoscientific works claiming many historical innacuracies about the history of Croatia and Croats, as well the history of Serbs and Serb Orthodoxy, which were used as historical arguments for the war in Croatia and Bosnia.

Milošević and the Serbian government supported reforming the Constitution of Yugoslavia to create a tricameral legislature, that would include a Chamber of Citizens to represent the population of Yugoslavia, a system that would give Serbs a majority; a Chamber of Provinces and Republics to represent regional affairs; and a Chamber of Associated Labour. Serbia's specific endorsement of a Chamber of Citizens and a Chamber of Associated Labour faced opposition from the republics of Croatia and Slovenia as they saw the proposals as increasing Serbia's power and federal state control over the economy, which was the opposite of their intention to decrease federal state control over the economy. Slovenia staunchly opposed the Milošević government's plans and promoted its own reforms that would make Yugoslavia a decentralized confederation.

Croatia and Slovenia denounced the actions by Milošević and began to demand that Yugoslavia be made a full multi-party confederal state. Milošević claimed that he opposed a confederal system but also declared that should a confederal system be created, the external borders of Serbia would be an "open question", insinuating that his government would pursue creating an enlarged Serbia if Yugoslavia was decentralized. In 1989, the autonomy of SAP Kosovo and SAP Vojvodina were de facto abolished by constitutional reforms that transferred powers away from the provinces to the Serbian government.

Milošević rejected the independence of Croatia in 1991, and even after the formation of the Federal Republic of Yugoslavia (FRY), it too did not initially recognize Croatia's independence. Plans by Milošević to carve out territory from Croatia to the local Serbs had begun by June 1990, according to the diary of Serbian official Borisav Jović. The Serbian government along with a clique of pro-Milošević members of the Yugoslav army and its general staff, secretly adopted the RAM or "frame" plan that involved the partition of Croatia and Bosnia to give large amounts of territory to the local Serbs that would remain united with Serbia, effectively a Greater Serbia. Armaments and military equipment were placed in strategic positions throughout Croatia and Bosnia for use by the Serbs, and local Serbs were trained as police and paramilitary soldiers in preparation for war.

Interviews with government officials involved in political affairs between Serbia and the Republic of Macedonia have revealed that Milošević planned to arrest the Republic of Macedonia's political leadership and replace it with politicians loyal to Serbia, when the Republic of Macedonia was still part of Yugoslavia. Upon the Republic of Macedonia seceding in 1991, the Serbian government declared that Macedonia was an "artificial nation" and Serbia allied with Greece against the Republic of Macedonia, even suggesting a partition of the Republic of Macedonia between Serbia and Greece. Milošević demanded the self-determination of Serbs in the Republic of Macedonia and did not recognize the independence of the Republic of Macedonia until 1996.

Serbian nationalists claim that in Communist historiography, Serbs were transformed into oppressors, the Chetniks of World War II branded as collaborationist as the Ustaše, and the massacres of Serbs were downplayed.

== List of Serbian nationalist parties ==
=== Serbia ===
- Serbian People's Party (2014–) (parliamentary)
- New Democratic Party of Serbia (1992–) (parliamentary)
- Movement for the Restoration of the Kingdom of Serbia (2017–) (parliamentary)
- Serbian Radical Party (1991–)
- Dveri (1999–)
- Serbian Party Oathkeepers (2012–present)
- United Serbia (2004–)
- Obraz (1993–)
- Serbian Action (2010–)
- Leviathan Movement (2020–)
- Serbian Right (2018–)
- Party of Serbian Unity (1993–2007) (defunct)
- Serbian Patriotic Alliance (2018–2021) (defunct)
- There's no Going Back – Serbia Is Behind (2022–2023) (defunct)
- Better Serbia (2017–2023) (defunct)
- 1389 Movement (defunct)
- Nacionalni stroj (defunct)
- Tsar Lazar Guard (defunct)

=== Republika Srpska ===
- Serb Democratic Party (1990–) (parliamentary)
- Alliance of Independent Social Democrats (1996–) (parliamentary)

== See also ==
- Greater Serbia
- Serbianisation
- Serbophilia
- Serbomans
- Rise of nationalism in the Ottoman Empire
- Albanian nationalism
- Bosniak nationalism
- Bulgarian nationalism
- Croatian nationalism
- Hungarian nationalism
- Macedonian nationalism
- Montenegrin nationalism
- Yugoslavism
- Irredentism
- Separatism
- Gazimestan speech
- Breakup of Yugoslavia
- Kosovo je Srbija
- National symbols of Serbia
