= Movement of Veterans of Serbia =

The Movement of Veterans of Serbia (Serbian Cyrillic: Покрет ветерана Србије, romanized: Pokret veterana Srbije, PVS) is a Serbian veterans advocacy group and former political party founded in 2002. From 2008 to 2010, it was known as the Party of Veterans of Serbia (Serbian Cyrillic: Партија ветерана Србије, romanized: Partija veterana Srbije, also abbreviated as PVS). After resuming its original name in 2010, the PVS largely ceased to operate as a political party.

Two delegates from the PVS served in the National Assembly of Serbia. Željko Vasiljević, who became party leader in 2005, was a parliamentarian from February 2007 to August 2008, when he resigned to become a state secretary in the government of Serbia. His replacement in the assembly was Saša Dujović. Both served in the parliamentary group of the Socialist Party of Serbia (SPS). In December 2008, Dujović left the PVS to form the breakaway Movement of Veterans (PV).

== Foundation and early years (2002–03) ==
The Movement of Veterans of Serbia was founded on 23 March 2002. Its stated goals were:

- "The establishment and development of democratic institutions, for the sake of the free and comprehensive development of Serbia."
- "Protection and preservation of all the rights of veterans (combatants, war invalids, and families of fallen soldiers) of Serbia and protection, improvement, and preservation of the traditions of the liberation wars of Serbia."

The PVS intended to contest the 2003 Serbian parliamentary election at the head of its own coalition electoral list, but it did not obtain enough signatures to appear on the ballot.

== Political activities under Željko Vasiljević (2005–10) ==
Željko Vasiljević was chosen as leader of the Movement of Veterans of Serbia in 2005. The PVS formed an alliance with the Socialist Party for the 2007 parliamentary election; Vasiljević was included on the SPS's electoral list and received an assembly mandate when the list won sixteen seats. The Democratic Party (DS), Democratic Party of Serbia (DSS), and G17 Plus formed an unstable coalition government after the 2007 election, and Vasiljević served with the Socialist parliamentary group in opposition.

The PVS continued its association with the Socialist Party in the 2008 parliamentary election. Vasiljević was again included on the SPS's coalition list and received a mandate for a second term when the list won twenty seats. The overall results of the election were inconclusive, and after extended negotiations the For a European Serbia (ZES) alliance led by the Democratic Party formed a new coalition government with the Socialists. As a member of the SPS group, Vasiljević supported the ZES-led ministry in the assembly.

Vasiljević resigned from the assembly on 27 August 2008 after being appointed as a state secretary in the ministry of labour and social policy. Saša Dujović, who also appeared on the SPS's list in 2008, was selected as his replacement.

Shortly after his appointment, Vasiljević suggested that more than two hundred thousand women could be brought to Serbia from Russia and other Eastern European nations and from Southeast Asia to marry Serbian farmers. He was quoted as saying that women from the regions in question, "are modest, know how to work hard, and do want to have children, unlike Serb young women who run to the cities in search of better lives." This comment led to widespread criticism, and he offered an apology.

The Movement of Veterans of Serbia split into two factions in late 2008. The branch led by Vasiljević renamed itself as the Party of Veterans of Serbia on 13 December 2008, and the name change was made official by Serbia's ministry of public administration and local self-government in January 2009. The other branch, led by Saša Dujović, became known as the Movement of Veterans (PV). The PVS did not have parliamentary representation after Dujović left the party.

The PVS's alliance with the Socialist Party broke down in 2009, and Vasiljević was removed as state secretary at the SPS's initiative in September of that year. Rasim Ljajić, the minister of labour and social policy, said that he had wanted to fire Vasiljević much sooner. "There was no benefit from him, only great damage," Ljajić said. "Because of his statements, I had to apologize to many people, and not to mention the ridicule of colleagues from abroad." For his part, Vasiljević said, "I guess I got fired because I talked a lot against the Government, which did nothing to help the veteran population, except send the police to remove them from the streets."

Vasiljević was arrested on suspicion of forging signatures for the registration of the Party of Veterans of Serbia in March 2010. Online accounts do not indicate how the matter was resolved, but the party was disestablished shortly thereafter.

== St. Tsar Lazar Guard ==
Vasiljević and Hadži Andrej Milić founded the St. Tsar Lazar Guard in May 2007. The guard's intended purpose was to fight for Kosovo as an integral part of Serbia in the event that the province declared independence. In advance of its first meeting, Vasiljević said that the guard's founding members would be "the first company of the Christian militia in uniform, made up of experienced war veterans from about thirty Serbian towns." Serbia's interior ministry expressed concern about the formation of a paramilitary group, though Vasiljević said that the guard was not planning to act outside state institutions. "All we want is to place ourselves at [the disposal of] the army and the police, in case Kosovo declares independence," he said.

When the guard was formed, Vasiljević was quoted as saying, "The struggle of the Serbian people for the right to live in these areas, free, proud and in the spirit of Christianity, has been going on for fifteen years. A lot of money was spent, NGOs and media were engaged in the fight against us." He also said that the group's enemy was not the Albanian people but rather what he described as "the Albanian al-Qaeda." Later in 2007, Milić described the PVS as the guard's political wing.

Although the guard received attention in the international media, it was not a significant factor in the events surrounding Kosovo's 2008 declaration of independence. It appears to have become largely inactive after this time.

== Activities since 2010 ==
Vasiljević re-established the Movement of Veterans of Serbia in 2010, although it largely ceased to function as a political party after this time.

The PVS supported Boris Tadić's bid for re-election in the 2012 Serbian presidential election and also offered support to the Democratic Party in the concurrent Vojvodina provincial election.

Vasiljević led in the PVS in a protest outside the Serbian ministry of defence in 2015. When minister Aleksandar Vulin refused to meet with the protesters, he said, "[Vulin] is not interested in our demands, nor in hearing what we have to tell him, and that is because we will not be an association of the Movement of Socialists, because that is the only thing this ministry deals with."

The PVS endorsed Vuk Jeremić in the 2017 Serbian presidential election. In November 2018, it joined the Alliance for Serbia.
