= Serbian Right =

Political party in Serbia

Serbian Right Српска десница
- Abbreviation: SD
- President: Miša Vacić
- Founded: 22 January 2018
- Headquarters: Belgrade
- Ideology: Ultranationalism
- Political position: Far-right
- European affiliation: Alliance for Peace and Freedom (cooperation)
- Colours: Purple
- National Assembly: 0 / 250
- Assembly of Vojvodina: 0 / 120
- City Assembly of Belgrade: 0 / 110

Website
- srpskadesnica.rs

The Serbian Right (Serbian: Српска десница, romanised: Srpska desnica, abbr. SD) is a far-right political party in Serbia. The party was founded in 2018 by Miša Vacić. The party has been accused of being a satellite of the ruling Serbian Progressive Party (SNS).

== History ==
Serbian Right was founded in January 2018. Miša Vacić, a former spokesman of the 1389 Movement was elected first president of the party, and former parliamentarian Saša Dujović was chosen as its deputy president. The congress was attended by 150 delegates. Among the guests at this ceremony were Milenko Jovanov, vice-president of the SNS Main Board, Branislav Puhalo, former security chief of Ratko Mladić, as well as singer Marko Bulat.

Miša Vacić stated that the party was founded to help Serbia and its institutions both in resolving the issue of Kosovo, and in everything that is important for the survival of the Serbs and that the Serbian Right will support the initiative of the President Aleksandar Vučić to open a dialogue on the status of Kosovo and Metohija and that they expect an invitation for active participation in the dialogue.

== Controversy ==
The party has been accused of being a satellite of the ruling Serbian Progressive Party (SNS). It automatically received access and positive treatment in the pro-government yellow press and television, where only the Progressives and their allies have such a privilege. Vacić gave a speech in Šabac which at that time was one of the few cities in Serbia controlled by the opposition and he said that he would "push Mayor Zelenović and his criminals down Cer into the Serbian Drina and strangle him", and that he would build a prison in which he would be exposed and spat at. The days before the local elections in Medveđa were marked by very debatable pre-election actions of the representatives of the Serbian Right, and the most public attention was attracted by the presence of members of this party in the premises where ballot papers are printed, as well as by publishing recordings of the whole process on social networks.

On 16 November 2023 the U.S. Department of State sanctioned Miša Vacić pursuant to E.O. 14024 for being responsible by working with the Government of the Russian Federation by acting as an observer in Russia’s sham referendums for purported annexation of the Russia-occupied regions of Ukraine in September 2022.

== Ideology ==
Its views are orientated towards ultranationalism, and it is staunchly socially conservative. It is positioned on the far-right on the political spectrum.

== Electoral performance ==
Serbian Right participated the 2019 local elections in Medveđa and it received 6.5% of the popular vote managing to pass the electoral threshold and enter the local parliament. The party also participated at the 2020 local elections in New Belgrade and only won 1% of the popular vote failing to enter the local parliament.

=== Parliamentary elections ===
National Assembly
Year	Leader	Popular vote	% of popular vote	# of seats	Seat change	Status
2020	Miša Vacić	Did not participate		0 / 250	0	no seats
2022	Miša Vacić	Did not participate		0 / 250	0	no seats

=== Presidential elections ===
Election year	Candidate	1st Round		2nd Round		Results
Election year	Candidate	# Votes	% Votes	# Votes	% Votes	Results
2022	Miša Vacić	32,947	0.89	—N/a		Lost ✗
