= Miroslav Čučković =

Serbian politician (born 1979)

Miroslav Čučković (Serbian Cyrillic: Мирослав Чучковић; born 28 February 1979) is a politician in Serbia. He is the current manager of the City of Belgrade, a position to which he was appointed in July 2022.

He was previously mayor of the Belgrade municipality of Obrenovac from 2012 to 2022. He has also served in the City Assembly of Belgrade and on the Belgrade city council (i.e., the executive branch of the city government), and he was briefly a member of the National Assembly of Serbia in 2012. Formerly with G17 Plus and the United Regions of Serbia (Ujedinjeni regioni Srbije, URS), he joined the Serbian Progressive Party (Srpska napredna stranka, SNS) in 2015.

== Early life and career ==
Čučković was born in Belgrade, in what was then the Socialist Republic of Serbia in the Socialist Federal Republic of Yugoslavia. He was raised in Obrenovac and graduated from the University of Belgrade School of Electrical Engineering. He worked for the company Kolabura Universal from 2005 to 2008.

== Politician ==
=== G17 Plus and the URS ===
Čučković was a G17 Plus candidate for both the Belgrade city assembly and the Obrenovac municipal assembly in the 2004 Serbian local elections, appearing in the twelfth position on the party's electoral list at the city level and the third position at the municipal level. The party won five mandates in the city and three in the municipality; Čučković was not automatically elected to the municipal assembly under Serbia's municipal electoral law at the time and did not initially take a mandate in either body. He received a seat in the city assembly on 29 November 2006 as the replacement for another party member.

He appeared in the 244th position (out of 250) on the G17 Plus electoral list in the 2007 Serbian parliamentary election. The list won nineteen seats, and he did not receive a mandate. (From 2000 to 2011, mandates in Serbian parliamentary elections were awarded to sponsoring parties or coalitions rather than individual candidates, and it was common practice for the mandates to be assigned out of numerical order. Čučković could have been awarded a mandate despite his low position on the list, which was in any event mostly alphabetical.)

G17 Plus contested the 2008 Serbian local elections in an alliance with the Democratic Party (Demokratska stranka, DS) known as For a European Serbia. Čučković was included on the alliance's electoral list in Belgrade and was given a new mandate after the list won a plurality victory with forty-five seats out of 110. The results of the election were initially inconclusive, but For a European Serbia eventually formed a new governing alliance with the Socialist Party of Serbia (Socijalistička partija Srbije, SPS). On 19 August 2008, Čučković resigned his seat in the assembly to take a position on the city council. He remained in this role for the next four years. In 2010, G17 Plus began working with a number of regional parties under the collective name of the United Regions of Serbia.

Serbia's electoral system was reformed in 2011, such that all mandates in elections held under proportional representation were awarded to candidates on successful lists in numerical order. Čučković appeared in the seventeenth position on the URS's electoral list in the 2012 Serbian parliamentary election and narrowly missed direct election when the list won sixteen mandates. He also appeared in the fourth position on the coalition's list for the Belgrade city assembly and the first position on its list for the Obrenovac assembly in the concurrent 2012 Serbian local elections. The party did not cross the electoral threshold at the city level, but it won twelve seats in Obrenovac and became part of a local coalition government. Čučković was chosen as mayor of the municipality in June 2012.

On 2 August 2012, Čučković became a member of the national assembly as the replacement for another URS member. He was not able to hold a dual mandate as a mayor and a parliamentarian, and he resigned from the assembly on the same day.

The URS became an official political party in 2013 via a merger of its constituent member parties. It fared poorly in the 2014 Serbian parliamentary election, however, and it dissolved in 2015. In June of the same year, Čučković became a member of the Progressive Party. He led the Progressives to majority victories in Obrenovac in the 2016 and 2020 local elections and was in both cases confirmed for a new term as mayor afterwards.

He was appointed as city manager of Belgrade in July 2022, shortly after Aleksandar Šapić was chosen as the city's mayor.
