= Miša Vacić =

Serbian politician

- Миша Вацић
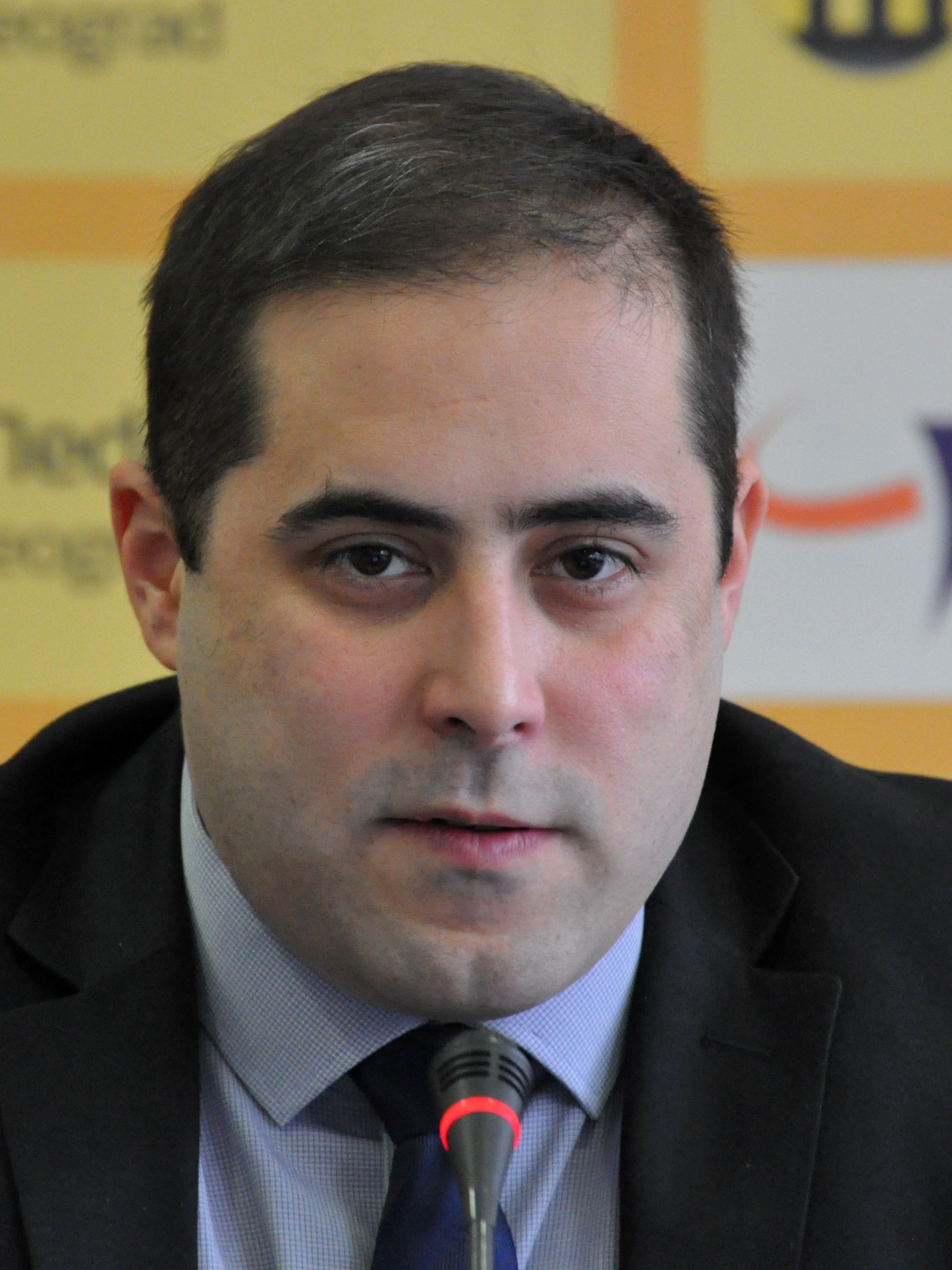
- Vacić in 2018.

Personal details
- Born: 5 June 1985 (age 41) Belgrade, SR Serbia, SFR Yugoslavia
- Party: Serbian Right

Miša Vacić (Serbian Cyrillic: Миша Вацић; born 5 June 1985) is a Serbian politician who is currently serving as the president of the Serbian Right, a far-right Serbian nationalist political party.

== Early life ==
He was born in 1985 in Belgrade. When he was 16, he moved with his parents to Germany. He studied at the University of Belgrade Faculty of Law but never graduated.

He returned to Serbia in 2004 because, according to him, "he loves his country" and that "every injustice done to the Serbs really hurts him".

== Political career ==
Upon his return to Serbia, Vacić became active in the ultra-nationalist 1389 Movement, where he first worked as a spokesman, and then in 2008 got expelled from the movement when he formed a new movement SNP 1389.

As part of the SNP 1389 movement, he was arrested in September 2008, when, despite the ban on gatherings due to the ban on the Pride Parade, he was among the members of the movement who gathered at the Faculty of Philosophy in Belgrade. The media reported that a gun, ammunition, body armour and ski masks were found in his apartment at the time.

SNP 1389 became a participant in the political struggle and tried to reach the institutions by going to the polls. After poor results in the Belgrade elections in 2014, he resigned as the head of the movement.

After a 3 year break, he returned to politics in 2017, as a passenger in a frescoe-painted train that left Belgrade for Kosovska Mitrovica, but never got there as the train was not allowed entrance to Kosovo. Vacić was handing out cards which said he was employed by the Office for Kosovo and Metohija as the advisor of the director, Marko Đurić. This has caused an outrage in the Serbian public. Speaking for N1, he said that there was a lot of rumours about his employment, but that he did not see what was disputable, considering that the basic human right is the right to work. This interview gained fame for him due to lexical errors and unusual confusion, as well as the negative response of the host to Vacić's request to get a glass of water while the interview lasts. Shortly after this interview, Vacić got fired from the Office for Kosovo and Metohija.

Although he strongly opposed the policy pursued by former Serbian President Boris Tadić towards Kosovo, since the Progressives came to power in 2012, Miša Vacić's criticism has been incomparably quieter for President Aleksandar Vučić and Kosovar President Hashim Thaci's negotiations, the signing of the Brussels Agreement, and Vučić's proposal for the partition of Kosovo.

In January 2018, Vacić founded the organisation Serbian Right and became its leader. Vacić stated that the party was founded to help Serbia and its institutions both in resolving the issue of Kosovo and Metohija (Kosovo), and in everything that is important for the survival of the Serbs and that the Serbian Right will support the initiative of the President Aleksandar Vučić to open a dialogue on the status of Kosovo and Metohija and that they expect an invitation for active participation in the dialogue.

In the local elections in Medveđa in September 2019, the Serbian Right won 6.5 per cent of the vote and thus won a deputy seat for the first time in one of the municipalities in Serbia.

He was a candidate for President of Serbia at the 2022 presidential election. He finished 8th out of 8 candidates with 0.89% of the vote.

=== Sanctions ===
On 16 November 2023 the U.S. Department of State sanctioned Miša Vacić pursuant to E.O. 14024 for being responsible by working with the Government of the Russian Federation by acting as an observer in Russia’s sham referendums for purported annexation of the Russia-occupied regions of Ukraine in September 2022.
