= Nataša Mihailović Vacić =

Serbian journalist, politician

Nataša Mihailović Vacić (Serbian Cyrillic: Наташа Михаиловић Вацић; born 1972) is a journalist and politician in Serbia. She has served in the National Assembly of Serbia since 2016 as a member of the Social Democratic Party of Serbia (SDPS).

== Private career ==
Mihailović Vacić lives in Belgrade. Before entering political life, she was the editor of the program Šta radite, bre (English: What are you doing?) on Radio Television of Serbia.

== Politician ==
The SDPS has been aligned with the Serbian Progressive Party since 2012 and contested the 2016 Serbian parliamentary election as part of the Progressive-led Aleksandar Vučić – Serbia Is Winning electoral list. Mihailović Vacić received the ninetieth position on the list and was elected when it won a majority victory with 131 out of 250 mandates.

During the 2016–20 parliament, Mihailović Vacić was a member of the assembly's culture and information committee and the committee on the rights of the child; a deputy member of the foreign affairs committee, the committee on human and minority rights and gender equality, and the committee on the economy, regional development, trade, tourism, and energy; and a member of the parliamentary friendship groups with Albania, Azerbaijan, Canada, China, Cuba, France, Germany, Israel, Italy, Japan, Norway, Russia, the United Kingdom, and the United States of America.

She received the fiftieth position on the Progressive Party's Aleksandar Vučić — For Our Children list in the 2020 parliamentary election and was elected to a second term when the list won a landslide victory with 188 mandates. After the election, she was selected as deputy leader of the SDPS parliamentary group. She is also a member of the defence and internal affairs committee and the culture and information committee, a deputy member of the foreign assembly committee, a member of Serbia's delegation to the Parliamentary Assembly of the Mediterranean, the leader of Serbia's parliamentary friendship group with Mauritius, and a member of the parliamentary friendship groups with Albania, Canada, China, Cuba, France, Germany, Israel, Italy, the Netherlands, Norway, Paraguay, Saint Vincent and the Grenadines, Sri Lanka, Turkey, the United Kingdom, the United States of America, and Uzbekistan.
