= 1389 Movement =

Serbian youth movement

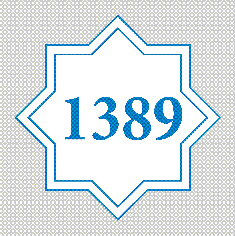
- Formation: October 10, 2004
- Type: Political youth movement
- Purpose: Preservation of Serbian tradition, affirmation of cultural, historical, spiritual and other values of the Serbian people
- Headquarters: Petefijeva 37, Belgrade
- Official language: Serbian
- Chairman: Radojko Rade Ljubičić
- Website: https://1389.org.rs

The 1389 Movement (Serbian: Покрет 1389, romanized: Pokret 1389) is a Serbian far-right youth movement. The organization is non-governmental and non-profit. The 1389 Movement opposes the independence of Kosovo, and has received recognition from the Serbian Orthodox Church.

== Ideology ==
Its name was adopted from the year of the Battle of Kosovo.

The Movement is Serbian nationalist, highly opposed to LGBT rights (especially the Belgrade Pride parade) and supports compulsory military service.

The movement opposes EU and NATO integration, which it sees as acts against a "free Serbia". Instead, the group supports Eurasian integration. It strongly opposes the 2013 Brussels Agreement and "normalization" of relations with Kosovo, which they claim is a euphemism for the independence of the Province of Kosovo and Metohija.

== History ==
On 4 December 2008, several members including the spokesman Miša Vacić were expelled from the organization. Vacić formed the Serbian People's Movement 1389 which was formally registered on 15 March 2010.

In February 2014, the organization received support from the Serbian Orthodox Church to hold anti-abortion lities in churches of the Archbishopric of Belgrade and Karlovci.

== See also ==
- Far-right politics in Serbia
