= Far-right politics in Serbia =

Far-right politics in Serbia (Note: Serbian: крајња десница, romanized: krajnja desnica, екстремна десница, ekstremna desnica, or ултра десница, ultra desnica) emerged shortly before the break-up of Yugoslavia and have been present ever since. Its manifestation mostly relies on national and religious factors.

Milan Stojadinović, the prime minister of the Kingdom of Yugoslavia from 1935 until 1939, saw fascism as an ideological role model for his premiership, while Milan Nedić, who was appointed prime minister of the puppet government in 1941, was a supporter of fascist ideas. Dimitrije Ljotić headed Zbor, a minor political party that was inspired by Italian fascism. Ljotić cooperated with bishop Nikolaj Velimirović, who is viewed as an antisemite and a promoter of anti-Western sentiment. The Chetniks under Draža Mihailović, who collaborated with the Axis powers as early as 1941, remained an inspiration for modern far-right groups.

During the break-up of Yugoslavia, the far-right re-emerged, with the Serbian Radical Party (SRS), led by Vojislav Šešelj, gaining support after using sanctions, increased inflation, and a high unemployment rate to their advantage to boost their support. The SRS cooperated with Slobodan Milošević during the 1990s, although it also briefly served in opposition. During the Yugoslav Wars, far-right groups committed violence and acted as paramilitaries, such as the SRS-led White Eagles. After the overthrow of Milošević in 2000, attacks orchestrated by the far-right rose. In parliamentary politics, the SRS won the most votes in the 2003 and 2007 elections, though campaigning on an anti-corruption platform. The 2010 Belgrade anti-gay riot was organised by the far-right, including groups such as Obraz. The Constitutional Court later enacted a ban on Nacionalni stroj and Obraz in 2011 and 2012, respectively. The far-right embraced opposition to immigration in the late 2010s, with parties and organisations such as Dveri, Serbian Party Oathkeepers, Levijatan, and People's Patrol embracing the sentiment. The Russian invasion of Ukraine helped the far-right cross the electoral threshold in the 2022 parliamentary election, though, in the 2023 election, they lost representation.

In Serbia, the Christian right and neo-Nazi variants of the far-right exist. Far-right groups tend to be antisemitic and Islamophobic, and they promote conspiracy theories. They also promote anti-communism, militarism, and religious fanaticism. Additionally, some have ties with the Serbian Orthodox Church (SPC). The far-right often glorifies convicted war criminals like Radovan Karadžić and Ratko Mladić, while some groups have also called for the rehabilitation of collaborationists Nedić and Ljotić. The far-right has orchestrated violent protests and attacks against ethnic minorities, the LGBT community, activists, and non-governmental organisations whom they label as "foreign mercenaries". The far-right promotes anti-Westernism, Euroscepticism, closer ties with Russia, and the return of Kosovo's sovereignty to Serbia. The unemployed working-class youth is often recruited by far-right groups; the far-right tends to present itself in the form of "patriotic" groups or humanitarian organisations. Far-right groups are often small in number and have been institutionally marginal, though on the Internet, far-right content has received a large following.

== Overview ==
=== Definition ===
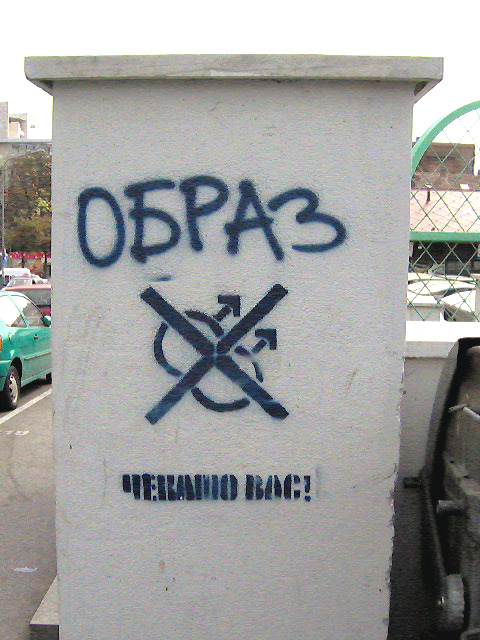
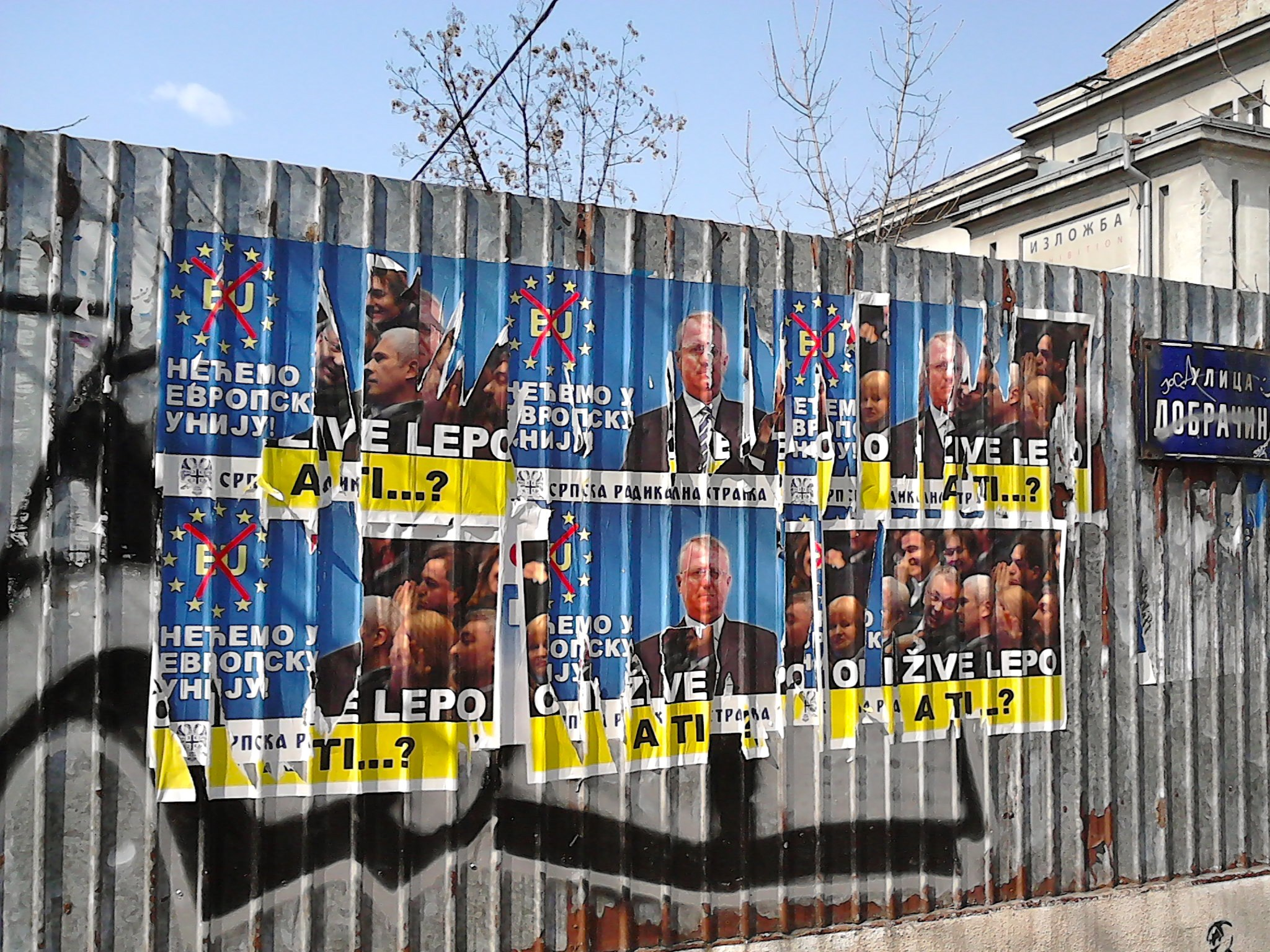
Far-right groups and individuals are known for forming the perception of an enemy; the LGBT community and the European Union are often perceived as enemies.

According to contemporary historian Barbara N. Wiesinger, the far-right can be divided into two groups: the first group is influenced by the Christian right, clerical nationalism, conservatism, and xenophobia, and it generally has ties with the Serbian Orthodox Church (SPC). The other group is well-connected with international neo-Nazi and white supremacist groups who also promote xenophobia and authoritarian views; the difference between the two groups is that the latter's views are more centred on race. Jovo Bakić, a sociologist, noted that far-right groups also tend to be antisemitic and Islamophobic. Far-right individuals also often glorify convicted war criminals such as Vojislav Šešelj, Radovan Karadžić, and Ratko Mladić, while some groups are also supportive of collaborationists Milan Nedić and Dimitrije Ljotić, and call for their rehabilitation.Additionally, some far-right groups promote historical revisionism about these figures. The promotion of conspiracy theories is common among the far-right.

Bakić also noted that far-right groups also promote a culture of "youth violence", since they regularly organise clashes with the police, or against minorities such as the Romani, LGBT population, and leftists. He also states that far-right groups form a perception of enemies, which commonly tend to be the West, traditional political parties, or minorities, while regarding Russia as a friend or a "brother". Far-right groups focus their ideological aims on minorities to gain public support; besides the Romani population, Muslims are also a common target. This results in the formation of "welfare chauvinism", which portrays minorities as "undeserving". The development of welfare chauvinism in Serbia has been similar to that in other parts of Europe; minorities are portrayed as "undeserving" of benefiting from Serbian welfare programmes. Initially, the far-right focused on other ethnic groups in former Yugoslavia due to the Yugoslav Wars, although they turned towards "internal enemies" after the overthrow of Slobodan Milošević. Since at least the late 2010s, far-right groups have also begun promoting several narratives regarding migrants due to the European migrant crisis, such as referring to them as enemies, and claiming that migrants are criminals or terrorists. Far-right groups regularly organise protests that are known for generating violence; they often participate in football match fights, and organised attacks against participators at pride parades. Neo-Nazi groups are connected with hooligan groups, while far-right groups and football fan organisations generally have joint membership.

Far-right groups are also known for their anti-Western sentiment and Euroscepticism, which they manifest through attacks against non-governmental organisations (NGOs) and activists; far-right groups usually describe them as "anti-state", "anti-Serb" or "foreign mercenaries". They are also known for assaulting human rights and pro-democracy activists and NGO headquarters. According to Mörner's study, far-right groups tend to feel less close to other European nations. Far-right groups also promote the notion that Western powers advocated secessionist nationalism in the republics of SFR Yugoslavia; this was due to the positions of Western politicians that advocated for the internal borders of republics to remain unchanged. Alongside perceiving the West as an enemy, the far-right also outlined the socialist government of Yugoslavia as an enemy; they refer to it as a dictatorship and as "anti-patriots" due to the narrative that the government allegedly attempted to destroy "Serbian national and religious identity and tradition". Anti-communism is also a key element of far-right groups; they tend to downplay the success of Yugoslav Partisans during World War II by promoting historical revisionism, and attempt to discredit the progress that was achieved during the existence of SFR Yugoslavia. Far-right groups had also openly taken part in Victory Day commemorations due to their pro-Russian views; their participation is in stark contrast to the anti-communist sentiment that is present in Serbia and other post-socialist countries. Most far-right groups espouse militarism, religious fanaticism, and chauvinism, and they support the return of Kosovo's sovereignty under Serbia, as well as preserving traditional and patriarchal values, and opposing abortion. Regarding economics, far-right groups in Serbia tend to advocate economics that are more left-wing than in other countries. In regards to religion, far-right groups formed connections with the SPC in the 1990s.

=== Symbolism ===
National symbols, such as the Serbian cross and Serbian eagle, had been adopted by far-right groups. In the case of the cross, far-right groups often use two different variants; the first one is silver-coloured, while the other one is red-coloured. Other groups also use the Russian cross as their symbol, while Obraz and Serbian Action use the Christogram as a "Christian Orthodox-patriotic" symbol. The Serbian tricolour is widely used by far-right organisations. Far-right groups also frequently use chants such as "Serbia to the Serbs" (Serbian: Србија Србима, Srbija Srbima). They also use pejorative terms for minority groups in Serbia.

During the Yugoslav Wars, turbo-folk music was used to promote nationalist and revisionist viewpoints. Notably, Serbia Strong, a song that lauded the actions of Serb military personnel such as war criminal Radovan Karadžić, and boasted about ethnic cleansing against Croats and Bosniaks, later became an internet meme where it was alternatively titled "Remove Kebab", and attracted further attention when it was played by Brenton Tarrant before instigating the Christchurch mosque shootings. Beogradski Sindikat (BS), a hip-hop collective, promoted conservative and far-right views through music. Škabo, a prominent member of BS, used to associate himself with Dveri, while Aleksandar Protić headed the Third Serbia political party, which was formed out of Dveri. A clothing brand named Otadžbina depicts neo-Nazi imagery and is used by football fans in Serbia.

=== Influence ===
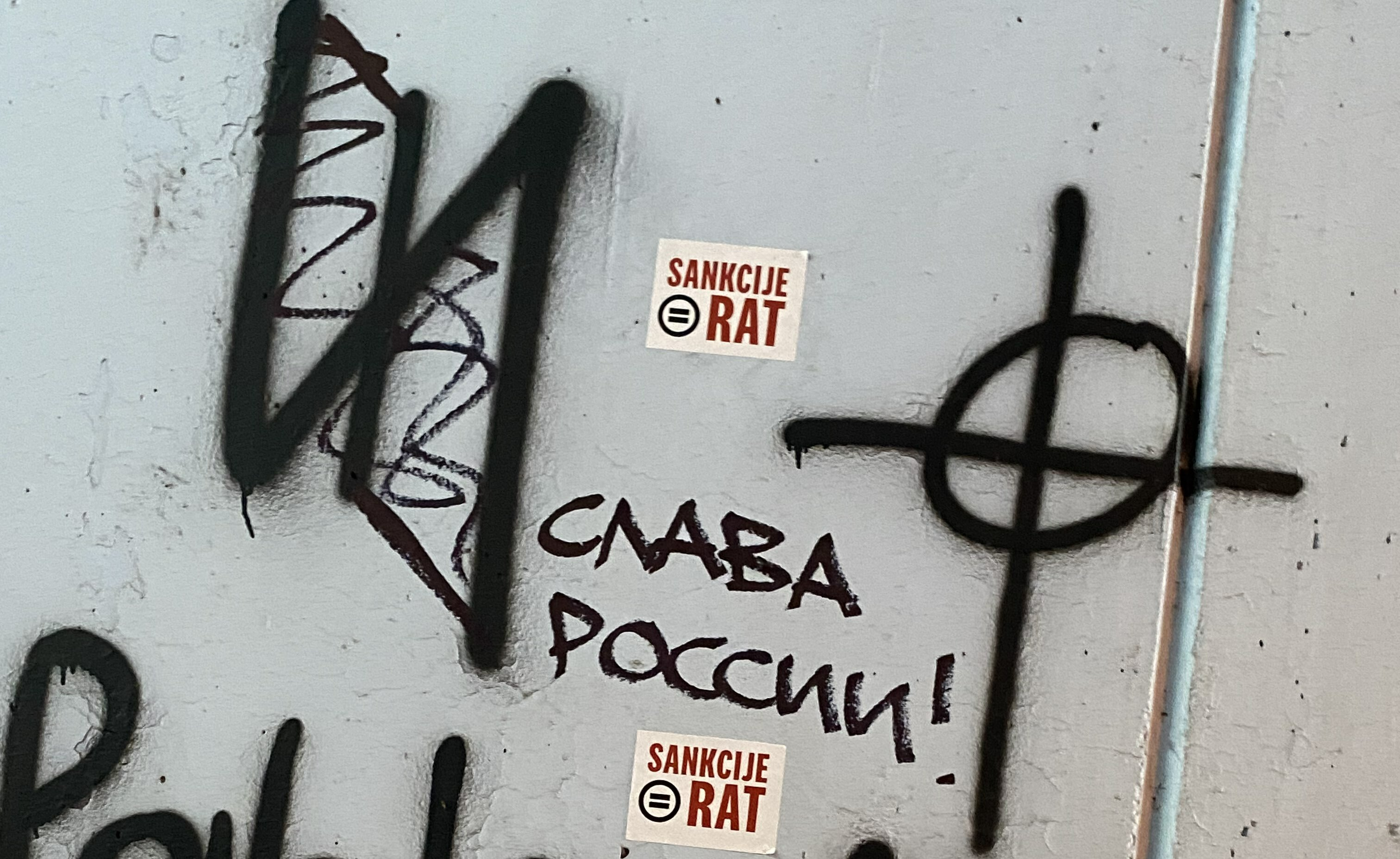
Belgrade graffiti that translates to "Glory to Russia!" along with neo-Nazi and white supremacist symbols. The far-right supports the establishment of closer ties with Russia, and it has also sided with Russia in the Russo-Ukrainian War.

Far-right groups recruit working-class youth who are usually unemployed and generally uneducated. The youth developed strong public political opinions against the West, NATO, and Western democracy after the NATO bombing of Serbia and sanctions. According to authors Denoeux and Carter, socio-economic, political, and cultural issues tend to radicalise the population. Far-right groups present themselves as "patriotic" groups or humanitarian organisations, while neo-Nazi groups tend to present themselves as "radical nationalists" by making covert or overt use of Nazi symbolism. Far-right groups stay small in number; according to Džombić, about 30 far-right groups were active with about 5,000 members in 2011. As of 2018, far-right groups remain institutionally marginal, although their public influence is at a higher rate. According to Bojan Klačar, the executive director of CeSID, contemporary far-right groups do not pose a threat unless they receive a large amount of support, while the political articulation of the groups is too weak to make an impact on institutions. Clerical-fascist groups had been considered to be more politically influential and organised than neo-Nazi groups.

Far-right groups are centred on using the Internet, while far-right individuals have also published magazines and books. Stormfront, a neo-Nazi Internet forum, was established in the early 2000s in Serbia. Groups are also centred on using social networks such as Facebook, Telegram and Signal, as well as alt-tech such as Parler. Far-right Facebook pages and groups in Serbia had received large amounts of following. Anti-immigrant activists had also formed a number of pages; this includes Generation Identity, which also has branches in other countries. Followers of the far-right European Solidarity Front for Syria (ESFS) page had attended the first major anti-immigrant protest in Serbia in 2016. Regarding the media, they had stayed neutral regarding the migrant issue; they had reported incidents in which they participated, as well as the problems that they experienced. Publications such as Glas javnosti, Večernje novosti, Kurir, Alo!, and Pravda were associated with the far-right according to 2010 and 2011 reports of Ramet and Stakić. Far-right groups had also attacked publications that were viewed as more liberal. Local media in Serbia also tend to promote "Russian-friendly" news stories or anti-Western narratives: websites have been found to be spreading the idea of ethnic purification or neo-Nazism. Discoveries have also been made that certain website owners tend to have connections with Russian state-controlled agencies such as RT and Sputnik.

Jim Dowson, a British far-right activist, and his Knights Templar International organisation had supplied bullet-proof vests and radios to Serbian groups in Kosovo. Dowson had regularly accompanied Aleksandr Dugin and former British National Party leader Nick Griffin in Serbia. In late 2017, far-right groups threatened to murder Marinika Tepić, an opposition politician, after criticising Jim Dowson's visits to Serbia. Robert Rundo, the co-founder of the white supremacist Rise Above Movement (RAM), had appeared and recorded videos in Serbia throughout 2020. Russia had also solidified its presence in Serbian politics through connections with far-right parties; it had also asserted itself as a "protector of traditional values" and an alternative to the West. Sources claim that between 100 and 300 Serb "foreign fighters" joined the Russo-Ukrainian War on the side of Russia; Aleksandar Vučić, the president of Serbia, claimed that the foreign fighters were mercenaries, while others stated that they were motivated by a sense of "nationalist solidarity". Some had received media attention, such as Dejan Berić. Certain foreign fighters had even joined pro-Russian paramilitary groups in Syria.

The Serbian far-right has made a major impact on domestic terrorists such as Anders Behring Breivik and Brenton Tarrant. Far-right groups in Serbia have also followed the trend of the global far-right such as showing populist tendencies and representing themselves as the protectors of "the people" and "free speech". The growth of global far-right views, such as anti-immigrant views, has also spread in Serbia. The socio-economic situation of individuals, insufficient trust in institutions, and the inconsistent attitude of the state towards the far-right have, however, also contributed to the rise of anti-immigration ideas.

== History ==
=== Yugoslavia ===
Following World War I, the Kingdom of Serbs, Croats and Slovenes was established. The state was composed of multiple ethnic groups, with the Serbs being the most populous group. It was initially a liberal parliamentary democracy, although in 1929, Alexander I imposed a dictatorship that lasted until 1934, and renamed the state to Yugoslavia. Alexander I's regime was described as "conservative authoritarian". During the interwar period, fascists and advocates of other far-right political movements in Yugoslavia received little support and some of them were even repressed by Alexander I's regime. The display of antisemitism in Yugoslavia was also rare.

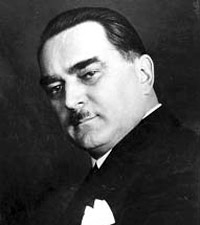
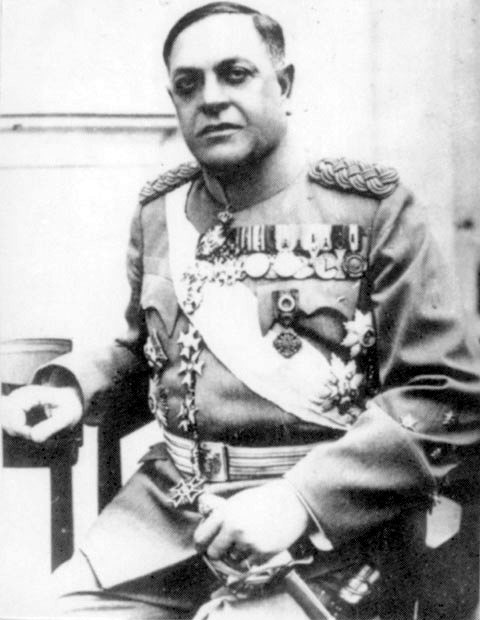
Milan Stojadinović (left) and Milan Nedić (right) were Serb fascist politicians. Stojadinović served as Prime Minister of Yugoslavia from 1935 to 1939, while Nedić headed the collaborationst Government of National Salvation.

The post-World War I Chetniks were ideologically divided; some of them believed that Yugoslavia should be governed in accordance with Serbian traditions and that the other two major ethnic groups, Croats and Slovenes, should be assimilated, while others believed that a new Yugoslav national identity should be developed. Its members were also divided between the Democratic Party (DS), which favoured an all-Yugoslav identity, and the People's Radical Party (NRS) which favoured a Greater Serbian identity. Chetniks later developed into "parafascists" and adopted anti-liberal and anti-democratic views, while maintaining nationalist traditions. Members of the National Defence (Serbian: Народна одбрана, Narodna odbrana), a militaristic association, usually sided with Chetniks in conflicts. National Defence adopted fascism in the mid-1920s and became sceptical about the parliamentary system. It had also opposed internationalism and promoted the cultural unity of South Slavs. Velibor Jonić, a Serbian fascist politician, was a member of the National Defence.

Following the assassination of Alexander I, Milan Stojadinović and his Yugoslav Radical Union (JRZ) came to power. JRZ acted as an all-Yugoslav party, and its members were from all three major ethnic groups. Stojadinović's rule was authoritarian and he imposed anti-democratic acts, while also seeing fascism as an ideological role model, and adopting centralism during his premiership. Stojadinović was dismissed in 1939 and replaced by Dragiša Cvetković. Dimitrije Ljotić, a Yugoslav Serb politician, who formed the Yugoslav National Movement (JNP Zbor), sought to introduce radical right and fascist policies. Zbor supported the creation of a corporative authoritarian regime, while it was also inspired by Italian fascism, anti-communism, and antisemitism. Ljotić cooperated with Bishop Nikolaj Velimirović, who was an antisemite and promoted anti-Western views; he had made an impact on Ljotić during the late interwar period. A chunk of its members had also left the party to join JRZ during Stojadinović's premiership. Zbor mainly received support from Serbs, and it remained a minor party after it received 1% of the popular vote in 1935 and 1938 elections.

After the beginning of World War II, the government of Yugoslavia adopted anti-Jewish laws. Milan Nedić was appointed prime minister of the puppet government in 1941; he was a supporter of fascist and ultranationalist policies. During his premiership, Nedić also promoted conspiracy theories about Jews. Kosta Pećanac, who headed Chetnik units in the 1930s, embraced chauvinism and led his group of Chetniks into allegiance with Nedić's government. Chetniks under Draža Mihailović began collaborating with the Axis Forces as early as 1941. Mihailović denied that he collaborated with the Axis forces, although in 1943 he admitted it in a conversation with a British liaison officer. After 1943, Mihailović collaborated with Nazi Germany on an informal basis. The Chetniks during World War II were royalist and nationalist, while their main objective was the creation of a Greater Serb state within Yugoslavia. Chetniks also favoured population transfer.

After World War II, the Communist Party of Yugoslavia (KPJ), later known as the League of Communists of Yugoslavia (SKJ), came to power and reformed the state as the Federal People's Republic of Yugoslavia, and the entire Chetnik leadership was either executed or forced to leave the country, with the later operating in exile. Josip Broz Tito led Yugoslavia until his death in 1980. Under his dictatorship, there have been relatively few instances of internal or external Serbian nationalist activity in national territory, with most far-right forces operating outside Yugoslavia. Between 1972 and 1976, several alleged collaborationists and exiled Chetniks in Western Europe were sentenced in Yugoslavia, and in March 1976, a Serb group assassinated a Yugoslav vice-consul in France. Shortly after Tito's death, local branches of the SKJ began promoting ethno-nationalist rhetoric, including the League of Communists of Serbia (SKS). The leadership of SKS was replaced by a more conservative one that argued for more nationalist views. The early 1980s recession had an impact on Yugoslavia and the crisis was exploited by ethnic nationalists to capture power. Also, in the 1980s, a number of paramilitaries began forming in Kosovo. The SANU Memorandum, which was leaked in 1986, made an impact on the far-right politics in Serbia; the document combined xenophobic nationalist views with conservative socialism, and it argued for the establishment of Greater Serbia. Slobodan Milošević, who held conservative, communist, and anti-liberal views, supported the memorandum and used it to rise to power. Milošević garnered support to remove Ivan Stambolić, who opposed the memorandum, at the 8th Session of the SKS Central Committee and later organised a campaign of street protests, named the anti-bureaucratic revolution. This served as a resurgence of the far-right.

=== 1990s–2000s ===
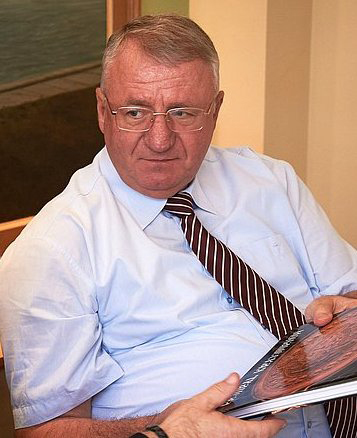
Vojislav Šešelj, leader of the Serbian Radical Party (SRS), became one of the most known far-right individuals in Serbia in the 1990s.

Following the revolutions of 1989, the far-right emerged again to the mainstream. Far-right groups brought extreme nationalism as well as support for the establishment of Greater Serbia, while at the same time, they also gained broader acceptance due to Serbia's position in the Yugoslav Wars. Following sanctions, increased inflation and a high unemployment rate, xenophobia saw an increase during Serbia's period of isolationism. Nationalists, such as the Serbian Radical Party (SRS), exploited this to garner broader support among the public. They promoted historical revisionism, which had been on the rise since the 1970s, and portrayed other Yugoslav ethnic groups as "betrayers", which formed the narrative of victimhood. The SRS closely cooperated with Milošević's Socialist Party of Serbia (SPS) during the 1990s, although it also briefly served in opposition. The Serbian Renewal Movement (SPO), a major opposition party during the 1990s, had also promoted extremist nationalism, although it abandoned the ideology following the beginning of the Bosnian War. Milošević, although declaratively a leftist, had connections with the far-right and promoted extreme-nationalist and anti-Western sentiment; he also promoted antisemitic and racist conspiracy theories.

Many far-right organisations acted as paramilitary organisations and openly supported and committed violence during the Bosnian and Kosovo wars. The White Eagles, a paramilitary unit operated by SRS and its leader Vojislav Šešelj, committed war crimes in Croatia, and Bosnia and Herzegovina. Its members were also referred to as "chetniks". According to a United Nations report from 1994, 55 out of 82 paramilitaries in former Yugoslavia were led by Serbs. According to the Southern Poverty Law Center, far-right groups criticised the United States during the Kosovo War, including foreign individuals such as white nationalist Louis Beam, while neo-Nazis had done it because "they saw Muslims as a threat to Europe". After the NATO bombing of Yugoslavia in 1999 and up until the overthrow of Slobodan Milošević in October 2000, far-right conspiracy theories were spread, while critics of the government were assassinated. Journalist Slavko Ćuruvija was assassinated in 1999, while former president of Serbia, Ivan Stambolić, was assassinated in August 2000; an assassination attempt on Vuk Drašković, the leader of SPO, also occurred in October 1999.

Far-right groups in Serbia gained a considerable amount of public attention in the early 2000s, although after the election of Zoran Đinđić as prime minister it was felt that the development of far-right ideas would become less tenable. Far-right groups had also turned into registered movements and organisations. During June 2001, far-right groups orchestrated violent attacks on the participants of the first pride parade in Serbia; the parade was cancelled half-way through. After Đinđić's assassination in 2003, far-right groups emerged again. According to Jovo Bakić, this rise occurred due to the promised but infeasible social development and European Union accession, as well as the wave of privatisation that left vast numbers of people unemployed. These organisations were also often in opposition to each other, although they had common ideological motives.

Since the 2000s, attacks orchestrated by far-right groups have risen. These attacks had often received media attention, although far-right groups did not attract much attention from the public. Due to the allegations that the government was involved in corrupt privatisation, SRS ran on an anti-corruption platform and placed first in the 2003 parliamentary election. SRS did not take part in forming a government. Věra Stojarová, a Masaryk University professor, pointed out that the high number of votes for SRS showed the "high frustration of Serbs". In 2004, a law that defined the Chetniks as "anti-fascist" was welcomed by parties on the right. A year later, Chetniks were de facto equalised with the Yugoslav Partisans following the implementation of the law on soldiers' pensions. SRS placed first again in the 2007 parliamentary election. Aleksandar Gavrilović, an editor for Istinomer, stated that following the formation of the Serbian Progressive Party (SNS) in 2008, the far-right saw its support drop to bare minimums. The far-right received further expansion following the declaration of the independence of Kosovo in 2008. Later in July 2008, far-right groups organised protests in support of Radovan Karadžić, which turned out violent. In 2009, a Belgrade Pride event was cancelled due to the announcement that far-right groups would prevent the event from taking place. The Public Prosecutor's Office had stated that Obraz and SNP 1389 should be banned due to their threats that led to the cancellation of the Belgrade Pride event.

=== Contemporary period ===
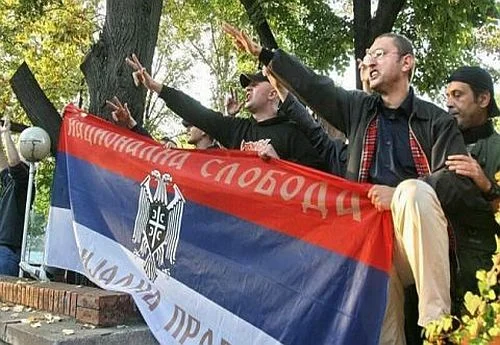
Nacionalni stroj was banned by the Constitutional Court in 2011 due to their violent acts, which were viewed as unconstitutional.

In October 2010, the Belgrade anti-gay riot occurred; it was marked with violence orchestrated by the far-right, which led to clashes with the police. Obraz was a notable participant in the riot. The Public Prosecutor's Office responded by submitting multiple proposals to the Constitutional Court in 2011. The Constitutional Court rejected the ban of 14 far-right groups in March, while in June, it deemed that the actions of Nacionalni stroj were unconstitutional and the Court banned them; the 2011 pride event was cancelled due to threats from far-right groups. The Constitutional Court also rejected the proposal to ban SNP 1389 and SNP Naši. Obraz was banned a year later due to "violation of human and minority rights and causing national and religious hatred", although it continued to operate under a similar name. Since then, some far-right groups have, according to Zorić, pacified their actions. Far-right groups also organised protests in support of Ratko Mladić in May 2011.

In the 2012 parliamentary election, for the first time since its establishment, SRS did not manage to cross the then-5 per cent electoral threshold and lost all of its seats in the National Assembly. According to Izabela Kisić, the executive director of the Helsinki Committee for Human Rights in Serbia, the newly elected government has since practically tolerated the far-right. A year later, anti-Romani attacks in Zemun Polje were concluded by far-right groups. Draža Mihailović, the leader of Chetniks during World War II, was rehabilitated in 2015 by the Supreme Court of Cassation, claiming that he was politically and ideologically trialed; far-right groups organised protests during the rehabilitation of Milan Nedić, although in the end, Nedić was not rehabilitated. Far-right groups had returned to the National Assembly following the 2016 parliamentary election.

A far-right group belonging to the white nationalist Identitarian movement organised protests in 2017, although a year later the Serbian branch was dissolved for unknown reasons. The branch was also linked with the promotion of discrimination. Kisić noted that Islamic extremism had seen a significant decline, while the far-right had been on the rise in the late 2010s. The Belgrade Centre for Security Policy (BCSP) noted that the far-right had begun showing anti-immigrant views, which did not exist before. This initially began during the 2015 migrant crisis, although political parties such as Dveri and Enough is Enough (DJB) began advocating anti-immigrant views in 2018. The two parties explicitly promoted the Eurabia conspiracy theory and claimed that Serbian citizens would become a minority in their own country. Organisations, such as Leviathan and the People's Patrol, orchestrated attacks against migrants. Its members had also begun "patrolling the streets" to intercept, threaten, warn, arrest migrants, as well as expel them from public transport. Both groups also video-recorded their actions and shared them across social media, while also targeting citizens who had rented apartments to migrants. Opinion polls also showed that the public shared similar anti-immigrant views with far-right organisations. According to a BCSP survey from 2020, the public viewed migrants as the greatest external threat to Serbia's security and as one of the three main threats to internal security, while three-quarters of respondents were concerned about free movement of migrants in towns and villages. In comparison with the research from 2017, in which migrants were listed lower, the far-right had an impact on increasing anti-immigrant views among the public. In the same research, voters were also interested in knowing the positions of political parties regarding migrants.

Following the beginning of the COVID-19 pandemic in Serbia in 2020, conspiracy theories regarding the virus began to spread; the far-right also spread these conspiracy theories. In the same year, the far-right saw a sudden rise in popularity. Following the 2020 parliamentary election, a series of protests took place in July. The government portrayed the protests as led by the far-right; a small group of far-right activists did participate in the protests, including former MP Srđan Nogo. In October 2021, Facebook Inc. published a series of documents that included far-right groups in Serbia that were connected with terrorism, violence, and hate. A month later, a far-right group harassed and attacked several peace activist groups, including Women in Black, due to their opposition to denying the notion that the Srebrenica massacre was a genocide. During the same period, a conflict emerged in Belgrade, after a far-right group made a mural dedicated to Ratko Mladić; peace activists had thrown eggs and paint at the mural to destroy it, although the groups would occasionally re-paint the mural. The conflict received national media attention, although the mural did not end up being removed. Following the beginning of the Russian invasion of Ukraine in February 2022, far-right groups protested in support of Russia. The invasion had helped the far-right cross the electoral threshold in the 2022 general election due to their pro-Russian views. Far-right groups had also stated their opposition to imposing sanctions on Russia. Dveri, the Democratic Party of Serbia (DSS), and the Serbian Party Oathkeepers (SSZ), all of which campaigned on their opposition to imposing sanctions on Russia, had entered the National Assembly. At the time of the campaign period, SSZ, SRS, and Serbian Right (SD) were viewed as allegedly under the control of the government. During the 2022 EuroPride event in Belgrade, far-right groups clashed with the police.

The Balkan Investigative Reporting Network published an interactive map of far-right organisations in Western Balkans in November 2022. Regarding Serbia, they listed Chetnik organisations, Conservative Movement Naši (formerly SNP Naši), Leviathan, Carostavnik, Moto Club Serbs, Obraz, People's Patrol, Rudder, Serbian Action, SNP Zbor, Youth 451, and Zentropa Serbia as far-right organisations. A month later, during the North Kosovo crisis, ultranationalist protests were organised by the People's Patrol. In the 2023 parliamentary election, the far-right lost all of its representation. The Mirëdita, dobar dan! festival was cancelled in June 2024, due to the protests organised by far-right groups against the festival.

== Political groups ==
According to the Anti-Discrimination Act, it is illegal for neo-Nazi or fascist groups to organise or display fascist symbols. Organisations that were banned due to their far-right views usually reorganised under a different name, while organisations that have received legal sanctions have either moved underground or transformed their ideological image. The government of Serbia has declared Obraz a clerical-fascist organisation, while Nacionalni stroj, skinheads, Blood and Honour, and Rasonalisti were labelled as neo-Nazi.

=== Organisations ===
==== Blood and Honour ====
Blood & Honour (Serbian: Крв и част, Krv i čast) was formed in Serbia in 1995. It cooperates with its UK-based counterpart. Ideologically oriented towards neo-Nazism, Blood & Honour has been operating as an unregistered and secret organisation in Serbia. Combat 18 is its self-described "activist branch", while Blood & Honour also has chapters in Belgrade, Novi Sad, and Niš. The organisation has regularly organised music concerts, and also takes part in neo-Nazi meetings abroad. Its members have had meetings with the National Socialist Movement of Denmark. The organisation is opposed to abortions, capitalism, and communism. It also claimed that Jews are enemies of the "white race" and that they were responsible for the NATO bombing of Yugoslavia, a view that they also share with Obraz.

==== I live for Serbia ====
I Live for Serbia (Serbian: Живим за Србију, Živim za Srbiju) is a far-right organisation that spreads anti-vax and nationalist views. Its views had been described as militaristic, and it has also expressed opposition to LGBT rights. I Live for Serbia wants to repeal the law that made vaccination mandatory and declares its support for making all non-governmental organisations illegal. Jovana Stojković, a former member of Dveri, heads the organisation. Stojković is a prominent anti-vaccination activist; she has claimed that vaccines cause autism, while also spreading misinformation regarding COVID-19. During the COVID-19 pandemic in Serbia, Stojković and her organisation opposed wearing protective masks. Due to her views, Stojković was detained several times, while the Court of the Regional Medical Chamber of Belgrade initiated a procedure to revoke her medical doctor licence in 2018.

I Live for Serbia previously cooperated with the neo-fascist Leviathan Movement. They organised protests together and participated in a joint list in the 2020 parliamentary election. During the 2020 electoral campaign, I Live for Serbia promoted antifeminist content. Their electoral list did not pass the 3-percent threshold. I Live for Serbia was later a part of the Sovereignists coalition, together with DJB and ZS. It participated in the 2022 general election but failed to win any seats. It was briefly part of the Healthy Serbia party in 2023.

==== Leviathan ====
Leviathan is a self-described animal rights group. Observers have described it as a "mix of National Front and PETA". Formed in 2015, it initially got its reputation from posting confessional videos on social media, in which individuals would apologise on camera for being cruel to animals. Individuals would continue by sharing their personal information, while Leviathan would sometimes confiscate pets from certain individuals. It later built a large following and garnered a large number of fans. Members of Leviathan had previously been members of neo-Nazi organisations. It has been described as a vigilantist group, and a group of its members were sentenced to prison for four months, with an additional 11 months under house arrest in 2020. Pavle Bihali, the leader of Leviathan, claimed that they do not use violence. A member of the group had driven into a migrant reception centre in Obrenovac in May 2020; the driver was later sentenced to eight months in prison. While driving, the driver chanted that "he does not want Serbia to become an Islamic country". Leviathan later organised an operation against the largest animal shelter in Serbia in 2021, claiming that its owner had let its dogs die. Dejan Gačić, the owner of the animal shelter, had claimed that his animal shelter was attacked because Leviathan wanted to force him out due to the amount of foreign donations that he had received before the raid. Leviathan had also conducted personal attacks on the Internet.

Observers have described Leviathan as neo-fascist, neo-Nazi, and alt-right. Bihali identifies himself as a far-right nationalist and has expressed sympathy for Nazism; observers have also assessed him as a neo-Nazi. Bihali is a supporter of the Greek neo-Nazi Golden Dawn organisation, and has considered the group a model for Leviathan. An anti-migrant group, members of Leviathan had taken part in "street patrols" with the People's Patrol, while they had also portrayed migrants as "rapists". Bihali had published misinformation regarding migrants. Its members have publicly expressed racist, anti-immigrant, and anti-ziganist views. Leviathan has promoted the Great Replacement conspiracy theory, while during the COVID-19 pandemic, Leviathan had spread misinformation about the virus.

Leviathan registered as an organisation in 2020 and participated in a joint list with I Live for Serbia in the 2020 parliamentary election, although it failed to cross the threshold. Jovo Bakić has claimed that the organisation was under the control of Aleksandar Vučić, while it has been alleged that Leviathan had cooperated with SNS.

==== Nacionalni stroj ====
Nacionalni stroj (lit. 'National Alignment') was a secret neo-Nazi organisation. It was affiliated with Blood & Honour and the neo-Nazi Internet forum Stormfront, and was considered to be a part of the "racist international". It was alleged that Nacionalni stroj and Blood & Honour concluded the destruction of Belgrade and Niš mosques in March 2004, attacks on the Women in Black movement in July 2005, and an assault on peace activists in Niš in May 2007. Nacionalni stroj also organised several far-right marches in 2007. These acts were celebrated by the organisations as "patriotic acts". During the anti-fascist walk in October 2007, members of the organisation attacked participants and threw rocks at them. The gendarmery responded by detaining the attackers, while some of them were sentenced to be tried at the Court. The Public Prosecutor's Office submitted a request in 2008 to ban Nacionalni stroj, which was concluded by the Constitutional Court in 2011. Its leader, Goran Davidović, nicknamed Führer, participated in the attack and was put on trial for the violent attacks. He did not appear in court, and instead moved to Trieste, where he lived until 2020, when he moved back to Serbia. The trial was suspended and charges were dropped in 2019. After moving back to Serbia, Davidović met with the leaders of Obraz and Leviathan.

The organisation supported the establishment of a strong centralised nation-state that would be headed by an authoritarian head of state who would enjoy the support of the military and the Serbian Orthodox Church. Nacionalni stroj was antisemitic, and stated that only white people would be entitled to full citizenship, while homosexuality, pornography, abortion, and other religious groups should be outlawed.

==== National Serb Front ====
Formed in 2011, the National Serb Front (Serbian: Национални српски фронт, Nacionalni srpski front) came to the far-right scene after the ban of Nacionalni stroj in 2011. The National Serb Front had organised meetings with several neo-Nazi parties, including the National Democratic Party of Germany and People's Party Our Slovakia. Its logo has drawn comparisons with the New Force of Italy and the Noua Dreaptă of Romania. Members of the National Serb Front have regularly participated in far-right protests and street fights. The organisation also published content dedicated to the leader of Nacionalni stroj. In 2017, the liberal New Party called for the ban of the National Serb Front. National Serb Front is ideologically opposed to neoliberalism and advocates for a "Europe of Nations".

==== Obraz ====
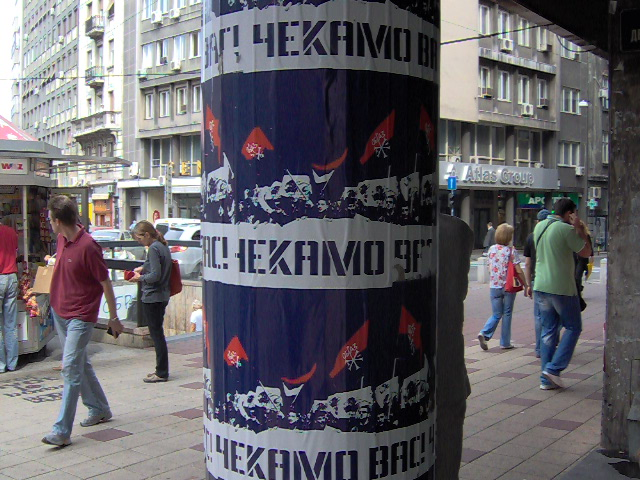
Obraz had organised attacks against homosexuals throughout the 2000s. It was banned in 2012 by the Constitutional Court, although it re-registered under a similar name.

Obraz was founded in the mid-1990s by a group of students who had published a magazine under an eponymous name. Nebojša M. Krstić led the organisation until his death in 2001, after which Mladen Obradović succeeded him in 2003. Under Obradović's leadership, Obraz formed connections with far-right groups from Romania, Slovakia, France, Italy, and Spain. Since its inception, Obraz has organised violent attacks. It played a central role in the Belgrade anti-gay riot that took place in 2010; its leader and other members were arrested a day before to stop the riot. After the parade, an additional 250 individuals were arrested. The government of Serbia had previously submitted an initiative in regards to its operations, and in 2012, the Constitutional Court banned Obraz. Obradović later re-registered the organisation under the name "Svetosavski savez Obraz". Throughout its existence, Obraz only participated in the 2014 parliamentary election, when it was a part of a joint list with the Serbian Radical Party (SRS) and SNP Naši. Obradović was a controller during the 2022 constitutional referendum.

The government of Serbia listed Obraz as a clerical-fascist organisation in 2005; observers also described Obraz as clerical-fascist. Obraz has been defined as hardline nationalist,and it is also openly antisemitic and it opposes minority rights. The organisation has also declared that Jews, Croats, Albanians, and other minority groups in Serbia are their enemies. Throughout the 2000s, Obraz concluded a series of attacks against minority groups and homosexuals; major attacks on homosexuals occurred in 2001 and 2010. They have also called for the punishment of homosexuals and non-Orthodox religious believers. Obraz called for rehabilitation of Dimitrije Ljotić, while also celebrating convicted war criminals Radovan Karadžić and Ratko Mladić as war heroes. Obraz supports the dismantling of liberal democracy, which it called a "judeo-masonic tool of oppression", argues that a corporative state must be established instead, and promotes theocracy. The organisation is opposed to Serbia joining the European Union, and calls instead for the establishment of Greater Serbia.

==== People's Patrol ====
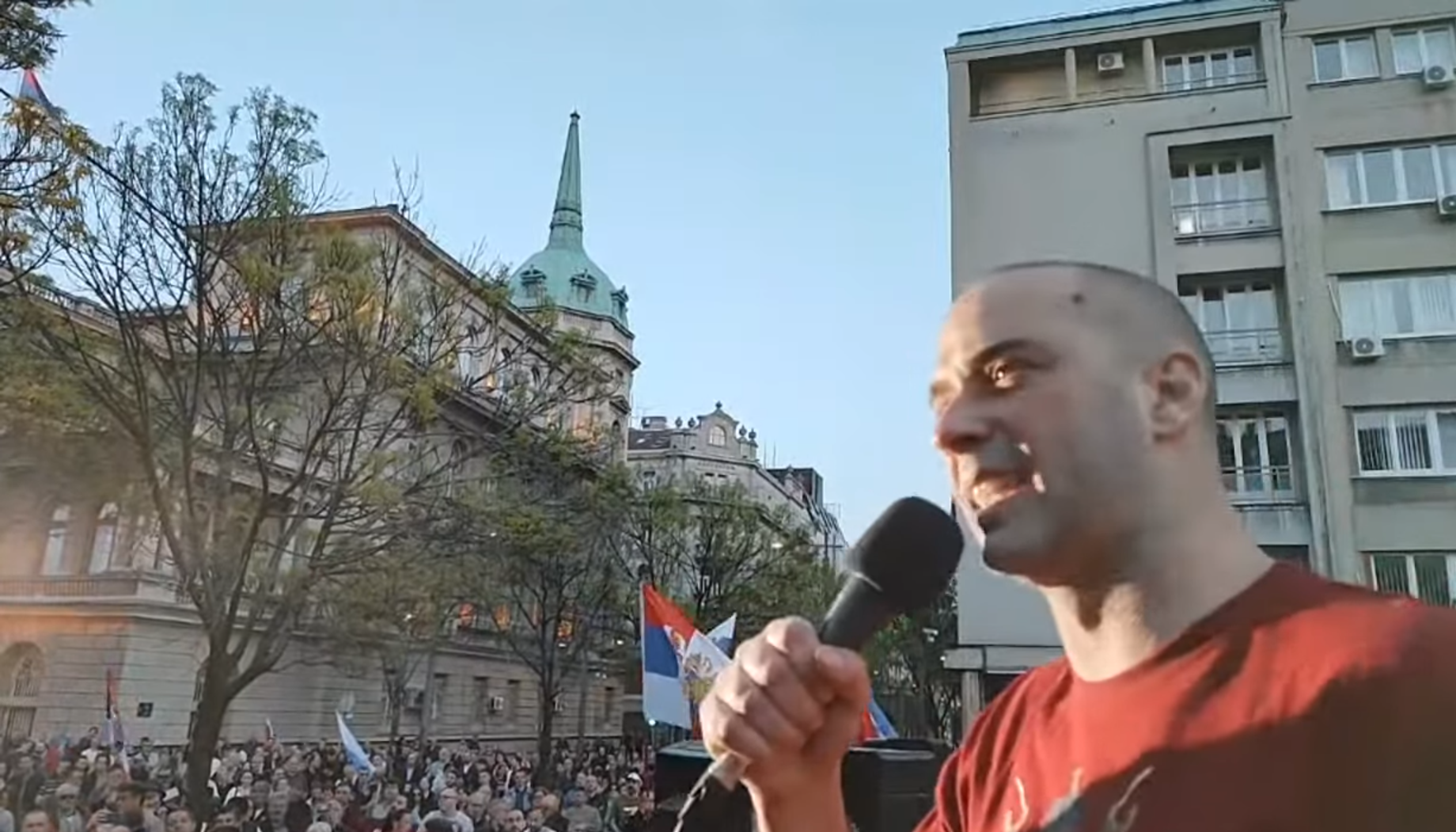
People's Patrol began its anti-immigrant actions in 2020, and following the 2022 Russian invasion of Ukraine, it also staged several protests in support of the Russian invasion.

The People's Patrol (Serbian: Народна патрола, Narodna patrola) is a far-right anti-immigrant organisation that began its actions in 2020. It is centred in Belgrade, although it also has branches in border towns such as Sombor, Bačka Palanka, and Šid. Its members occasionally stop migrants from entering Serbia in border towns. They had also disturbed journalists at their protests. Their members have been involved in several incidents; in late 2020, one of them threatened and blocked the paths of taxi drivers who were transporting migrants, while in 2021, a People's Patrol member kicked a group of migrants out of a bus and threatened them with violence. Later in October 2021, the People's Patrol attacked a Sombor resident who had let migrants sleep in his hostel. The person who operated the hostel received death threats from People's Patrol members and supporters. Multiple anti-immigrant protests were also organised by the People's Patrol, starting in March 2020. The participants had also showed nationalist and anti-vaccination sentiment.

People's Patrol has been described as ultranationalist. Like Leviathan, the organisation has portrayed migrants as "rapists" and called for people who helped migrants to be lynched. The People's Patrol had used the lack of trust in institutions as a reason and justification to patrol and arrest migrants, and it has also publicly criticised the police. Its leader, Damnjan Knežević, was summoned several times by the police for inciting hatred and intolerance. Knežević was a member of the SSZ, and served as its vice-president at one point. Besides their anti-immigrant activity, its members also launched an initiative regarding Kosovo, which was viewed as ethno-nationalist. The organisation has also promoted antifeminism and misogyny. Following the 2022 Russian invasion of Ukraine, People's Patrol staged several pro-Russian protests in March and April 2022. People's Patrol has connections with far-right groups in Russia that took part in the 2022 invasion of Ukraine. In January 2023, lawyer Čedomir Stojković accused Knežević of being a member of the Wagner Group and recruiting Serbian citizens to fight in Ukraine.

According to research, supporters of the People's Patrol tend to be younger and middle-aged men with a secondary education and manual jobs. Srđan Nogo, Jovana Stojković and Goran Davidović have stated their support for the organisation.

==== SNP 1389 ====
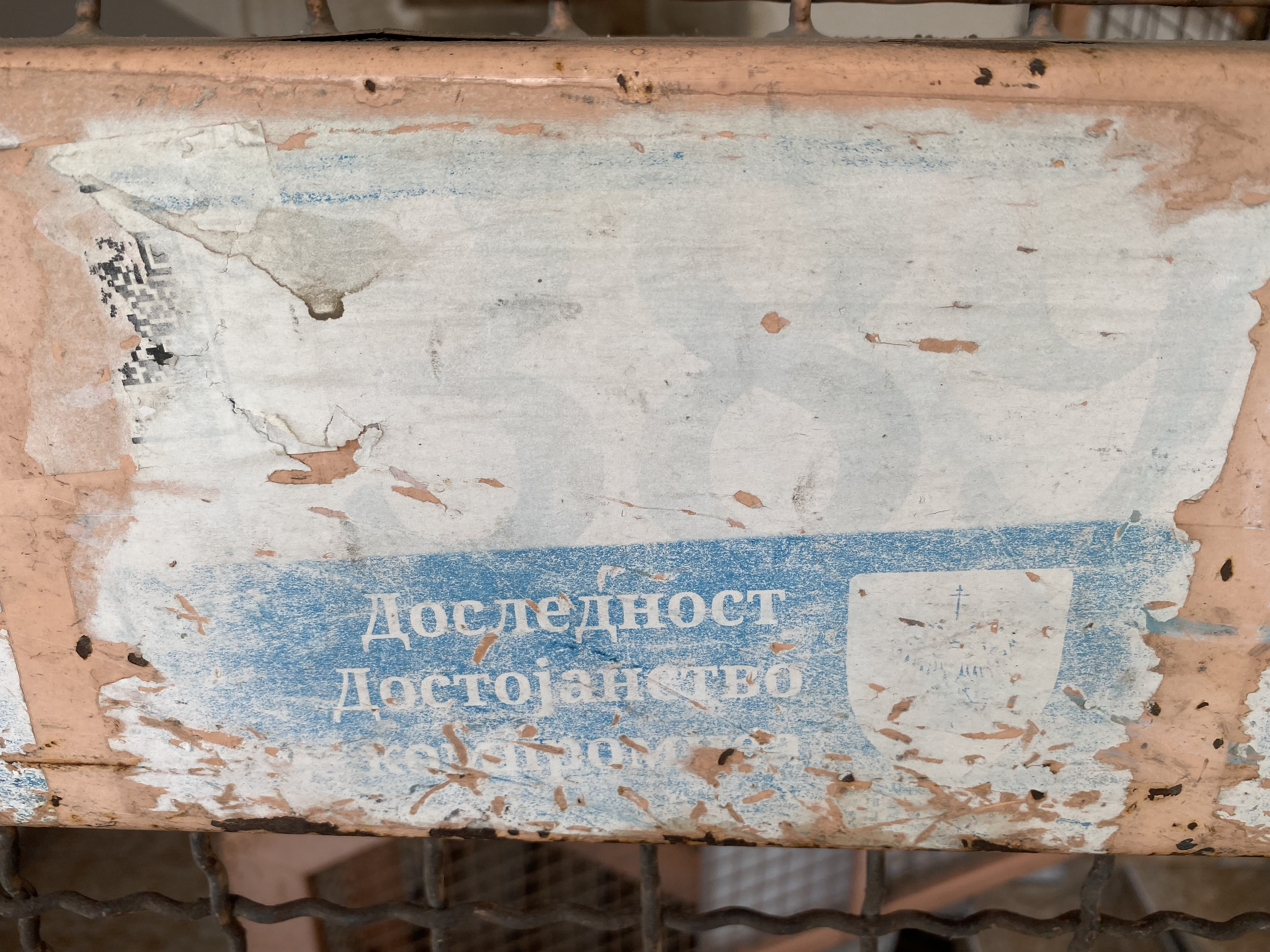
SNP 1389 is a far-right organisation. Miša Vacić led the organisation from 2008 until the mid-2010s.

SNP 1389 was formed in 2004. The organisation was initially called "1389", but it later changed its name to "1389 Movement" and then to SNP 1389. Radojko Ljubičić served as the first leader, although he was dismissed by Miša Vacić in 2008, after which Vacić proclaimed himself the leader of the organisation. During his leadership, Vacić participated in far-right protests across Europe and orchestrated anti-LGBT protests in Serbia. Due to his discriminatory actions against the LGBT population, Vacić was detained several times. The main belligerents of the movement are far-right hooligan groups that have been linked with organised crime. In 2008, a group of its members attacked the participants of the Queer festival; Vacić and others were arrested due to the attack. SNP 1389 has also organised protests in support of Ratko Mladić. For a brief period between 2010 and 2011, SNP 1389 was merged with SNP Naši. SNP 1389 participated in the 2014 Belgrade City Assembly election, in which it won 0.08% of the popular vote.

The organisation has been classified as far-right, staunchly nationalist and ultraconservative. SNP 1389 has also been described as neo-Nazi. It denies the notion that the Srebrenica massacre was a genocide and promotes irredentism; they have also claimed North Macedonia and parts of Northern Albania as part of Greater Serbia. It has listed drug addicts, homosexuals, and the Catholic Church as its enemies. SNP 1389 also advocates for the nationalisation of foreign-acquired Serbian companies.

==== SNP Naši ====
The organisation was founded in 2006 by former members of Obraz. A far-right organisation led by Ivan M. Ivanović, SNP Naši has used similar rhetoric to SNP 1389. Ivanović appeared in court multiple times, where proceedings against him were held due to provoking racial discrimination. Charges against him were dropped in 2018. SNP Naši later changed its name to Conservative Movement Naši. Observers had described it as a clerical-fascist organisation, it supports the creation of Greater Serbia and has opposed LGBT rights. As a staunch pro-Russian organisation, SNP Naši has called for Eurasian integration; it has also organised antisemitic acts. SNP Naši is staunchly critical of Josip Broz Tito. The organisation has also called to ban George Soros-funded NGOs in Serbia.

==== Serbian Action ====
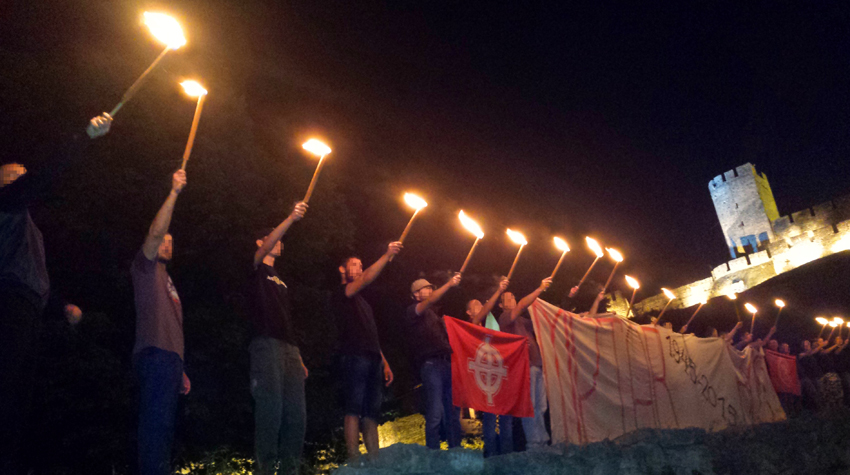
Serbian Action members honouring with torchlight 70th anniversary of the death of Serbian fascist ideologue Dimitrije Ljotić

Serbian Action was formed in 2010. The organisation tried to stop the "Propaganda Poster in Nedić's Serbia" forum from being held in 2015, although it failed. Serbian Action has also attended multiple far-right protests; in 2018, it organised a rally in support of rehabilitation of Milan Nedić. The organisation has been described as clerical-fascist, as well as neo-fascist with clerical elements. It is staunchly socially conservative, and opposes LGBT rights; it has accused the LGBT community of spreading "gay propaganda". Serbian Action had previously published several anti-ziganist articles. One of its members was arrested in 2014 after calling to lynch Romanis. It had also stated its support for monarchism and opposition to capitalism.

==== Serbian Honour ====
A self-described humanitarian organisation, Serbian Honour was formed in 2014. It has been led by Bojan Stojković since its formation. The organisation also has a branch in Republika Srpska; the branch was previously headed by Igor Bilbija, who was arrested for prostitution and racketeering. Serbian Honour garnered public attention in 2014 after participating in attacks during a football game between Albania and Serbia. Three years later, Stojković organised a protest to stop the projection of a documentary movie that showed positive relations between Serbs and Albanians during the Yugoslav Wars. In 2019, members of the Serbian Honour organisation stole a horse from a Romani boy. They subsequently video-taped his "re-education" and posted it across social media. Serbian Honour returned the horse to its owners later that year.

According to the Business Register Agency (APR), the organisation is listed as a youth organisation that promotes youth activism, human rights, and conservationism. In practice, it has been described as an extremist paramilitary organisation, while the organisation has also promoted militarism and praised convicted war criminals. Its members have also promoted homophobia and opposed minority rights. Serbian Honour has been described as a Russian-trained paramilitary organisation.

=== Political parties ===
==== Dveri ====
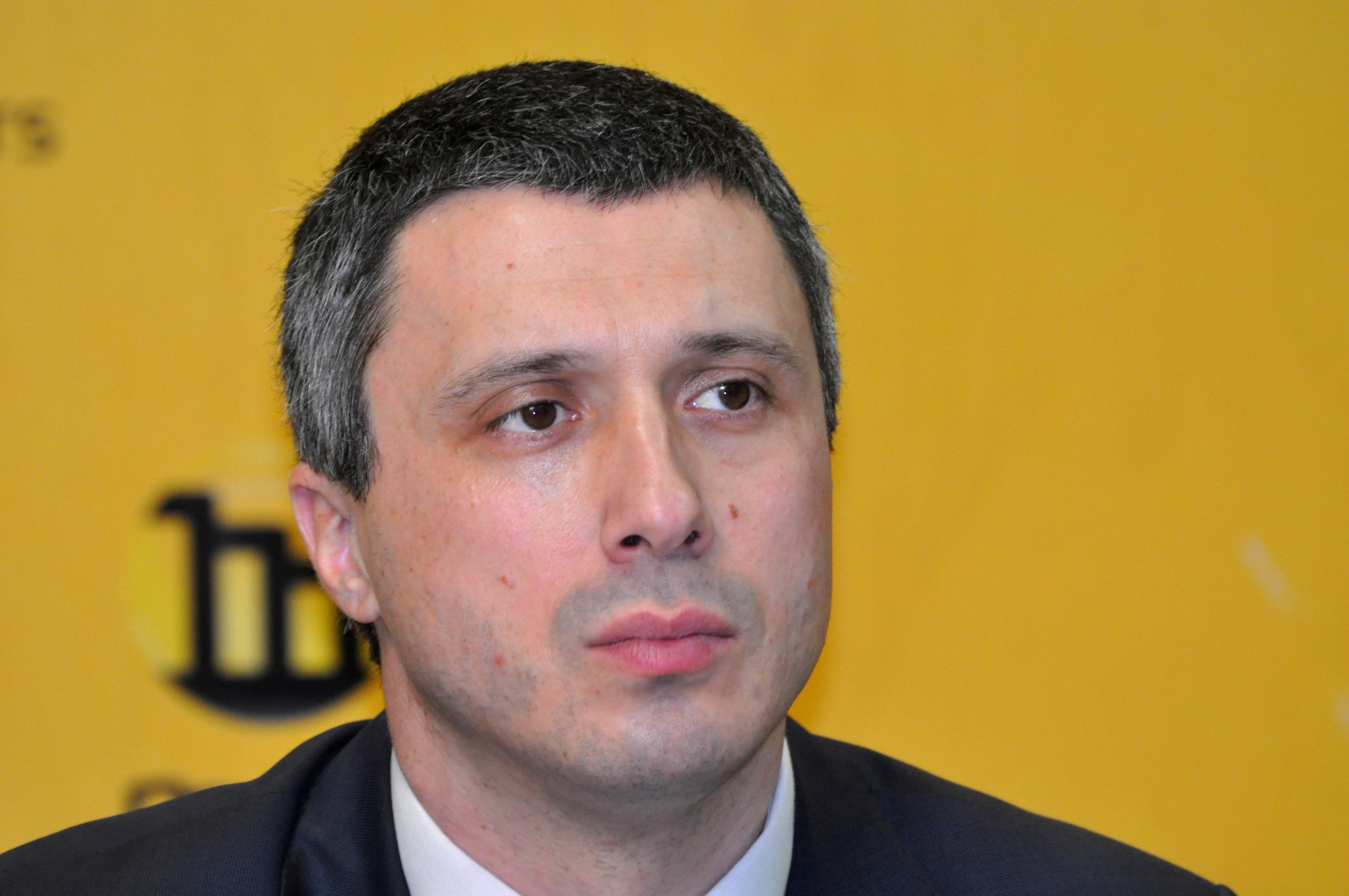
Boško Obradović co-founded Dveri in 1999 as a student organisation. He was its president from 2015 to 2023.

Initially a political organisation, Dveri was formed in 1999 by a group of students that had published a magazine named Dveri Srpske. Boško Obradović, one of the co-founders of the organisation, led Dveri from 2015 to 2023. Dveri already had the characteristics of a political party in the late 2000s, although it only registered as a political party in 2015. The party began participating in electoral politics in 2012 and has continued to do so since then, although it boycotted the 2020 parliamentary election. The party entered the National Assembly in 2016 after winning 7 seats in the parliamentary election. It was later a part of the catch-all opposition Alliance for Serbia. Dveri returned to the National Assembly following the 2022 election. It has also proven to have a relatively stable electorate at the national level. Dveri had previously cooperated with United Russia and Alternative for Germany.

Throughout the 2000s, Dveri promoted a combination of clericalism and extreme nationalism named svetosavlje, an ideology linked to Bishop Nikolaj Velimirović. Dveri promotes closer ties between the state and church, and has been accused of homophobia due to their Christian right stances. Máté-Tóth described Dveri as a religious fundamentalist party. Dveri has regularly organised "family walks" since 2009, as a counter-parade that promotes conservative values. It also has close ties with the Serbian Orthodox Church. Dveri has also campaigned against abortion and gay rights. A populist party, Dveri shifted their views from Jews to homosexuals and later campaigned for the "traditional family". It has also campaigned against immigration. Regarding economics, Dveri is supportive of economic nationalism and protectionism. It also advocates for monarchism and supports a hierarchical society that would be governed by a king and pseudo-democratic institutions which would eventually replace liberal democracy. Dveri is opposed to Serbia joining the European Union, and has shown its opposition to the West and its support for Russia. Vladan Glišić, a former high-ranking member, accused the European Union of being "fascist". It opposes sanctioning Russia in regards to the 2022 Russian invasion of Ukraine.

Scholars have described Dveri as far-right and right-wing extremist, while Rada Drezgić described it as a conservative movement. Bakić rejected describing Dveri as fascist and instead described it as extremely conservative, nationalist and anti-globalist. It has been also ideologically identified as ultranationalist. Dinić's comments on their political programme describe it as a fusion of ultranationalism with elements of fascism. Political scientists Florian Bieber and Filip Milačić have also described Dveri as far-right. Obradović himself has described Dveri as an anti-fascist party.

==== Serbian Party Oathkeepers ====
Formed in 2012, the Serbian Party Oathkeepers (SSZ) has been described as a far-right political party. Milica Đurđević Stamenkovski has been the main spokesperson of the party since its formation. SSZ had attacked non-governmental organisations (NGOs) and labelled them "foreign mercenaries". SSZ has also been aided by the ruling Serbian Progressive Party (SNS). It has cooperated with the Italian Lega Nord party and has had meetings with United Russia. In 2016, its representatives met with Sergey Lavrov during his visit to Belgrade.

An ultranationalist party, SSZ promotes socially conservative views and opposes immigration. SSZ has been a vocal supporter of historical revisionism; claiming that "Serbians have been victims of the West" and supporting the revision of history textbooks. It opposes Serbia joining the European Union and wants to establish closer ties with Russia. It has regularly participated in parliamentary elections, although it only managed to cross the threshold after the 2022 election. It lost participation in the 2023 election, but Đurđević Stamenkovski became a government minister in 2024.

==== Serbian Radical Party ====
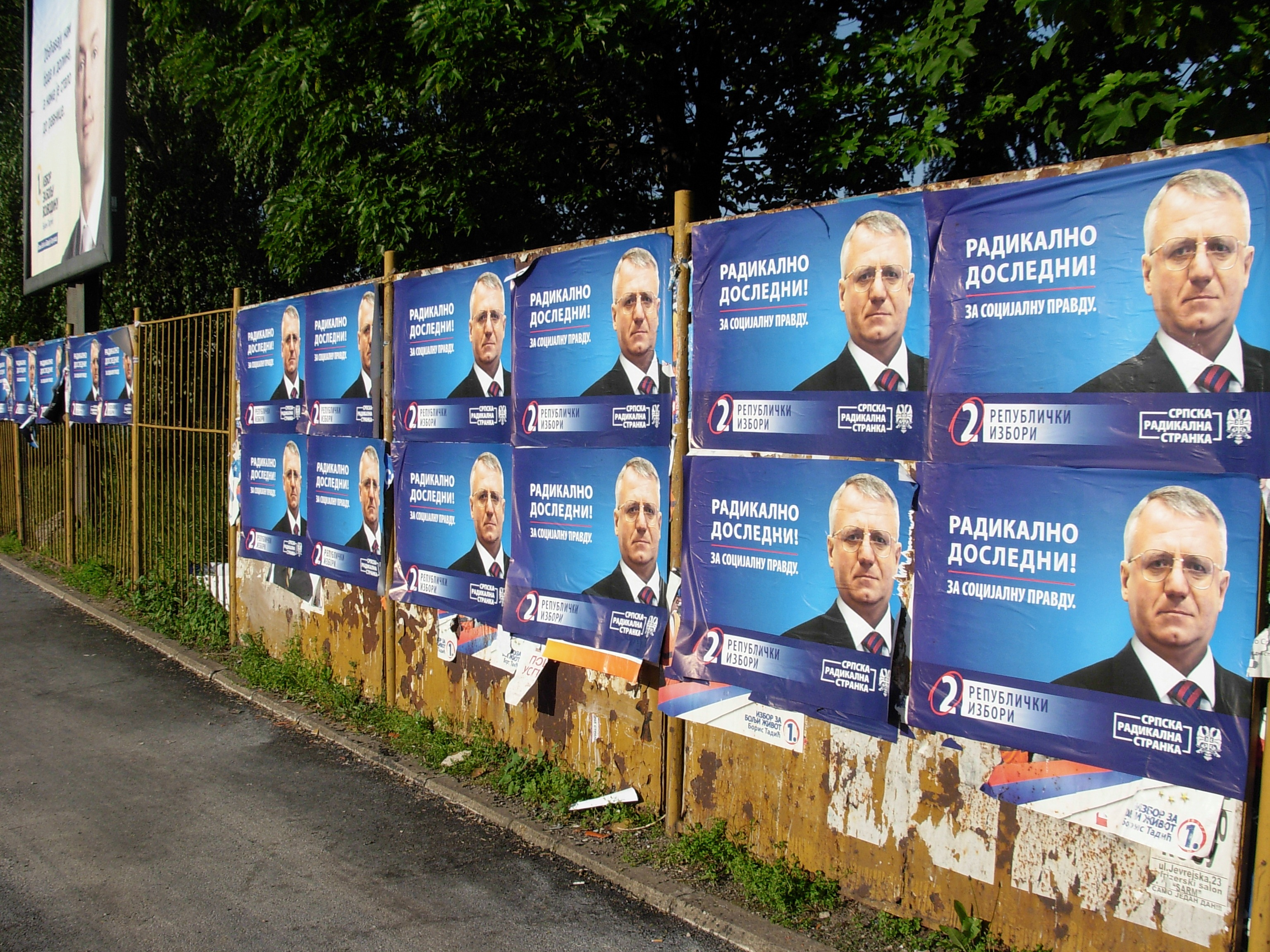
The Serbian Radical Party (SRS) was the most prominent far-right party in Serbia

Often described as the most prominent far-right party in Serbia, the Serbian Radical Party (SRS) was founded in 1991 and has been led by Vojislav Šešelj since its foundation. SRS supported Milošević and his SPS in the first half of the 1990s, as Milošević contributed to the mass support that SRS received due to media control. It also briefly served in opposition, but it again cooperated with SPS during the "war government". Members of SRS were involved in paramilitary activities during the Yugoslav Wars. Šešelj was convicted of war crimes by the International Criminal Tribunal for the former Yugoslavia (ICTY) in 2003, and later that year, after campaigning on an anti-corruption platform, it placed first in the 2003 parliamentary election, but did not join the government. Tomislav Nikolić and Aleksandar Vučić gradually moderated the image of the party, although in 2008 they split from SRS to form the SNS. In comparison with SRS, SNS has been supportive of accession of Serbia to the European Union. SRS dropped out of parliament in 2012, although it returned in 2016 after Šešelj was permitted to come back to Serbia. In the 2020 election and onwards, it has not received enough votes to cross the electoral threshold.

An ultranationalist party, it was also described as neo-fascist during the 1990s. Observers have also described it as quasi-fascist. SRS is a major proponent of Greater Serbia, an irredentist concept that would include parts of Bosnia and Herzegovina, Croatia, Montenegro, and Kosovo. A populist party, it opposes Serbia joining the European Union and promotes closer ties with Russia. It is socially conservative and is in favour of welfare chauvinism. SRS was previously supported by far-right skinheads, although they terminated their support following Šešelj's refusal to support them after the murder of a Romani child in 1999.

Serbian Radical Party has local branches in Bosnia and Herzegovina, Montenegro, and North Macedonia. It was also the guest of Vladimir Zhirinovsky, leader of the Liberal Democratic Party of Russia.

==== Serbian Right ====
Serbian Right (SD) is a far-right political party led by Miša Vacić. Vacić previously headed SNP 1389. The party was formed out of fifteen movements that held similar ideological beliefs, while it also received support from Jim Dowson, a British far-right activist, as well as from local political leaders. Observers have claimed that the party was under control of Aleksandar Vučić. During one of its early assembly conferences in Šabac, Vacić threatened opposition politicians Marinika Tepić and Nebojša Zelenović with violence. Government associates such as Milenko Jovanov and Zoran Đorđević participated in the conference. Vacić also organised attacks against opposition figures in 2017 and 2019. Later in June 2021, Vacić attended a meeting that was organised by the neo-fascist Alliance for Peace and Freedom. Vacić was a presidential candidate in the 2022 election; he won 0.9 percent of the popular vote.

As an ultranationalist party, it has promoted traditionalism, and stated its support for Serbia joining the Eurasian Economic Union. Vacić has stated his support for the Russian invasion of Ukraine. According to its programme, the party supports the formation of a patriarchal and hierarchal society, as well as monarchy, authority, and Serbian Orthodoxy. Its rhetoric has been considered to be racist and anti-migrant. Vacić and his party have cooperated with the neo-fascist Alliance for Peace and Freedom European party.

=== Others ===
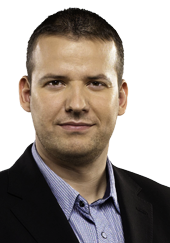
László Toroczkai led the Hungarian far-right Sixty-Four Counties Youth Movement.

Far-right organisations such as Sveti Justin Filozof and Nomokanon had also received media attention. Sveti Justin Filozof was a nationalist organisation that was led by Milan Bates. It later moderated their stances, although it was dissolved by 2008. Nomokanon was aided by the Serbian Orthodox Church (SPC). Rasonalisti, a neo-Nazi organisation, was active throughout the 2000s. They had rejected the left–right political spectrum and instead supported "racial nationalism". Rasonalisti also operated an Internet forum, which acted similar to Stormfront. Solidarité Kosovo, a far-right organisation, is led by Arnaud Gouillon and it promotes historical revisionism. Gouillion took part in the 2012 French presidential election, in which he was a candidate for the white supremacist Generation Identity movement. In 2020, he was appointed to the position of director of the Office for Cooperation with the Diaspora and the Serbs in the Region. Zentropa Srbija is a neo-Nazi group that has praised Nedić and organised a gathering to mark the anniversary of his suicide in 2023. Party of Serbian Unity was a far-right political party led by Željko Ražnatović "Arkan". An ultranationalist party, it was represented in the National Assembly during the 2000–2003 convocation.

The far-right Hungarian nationalist Sixty-Four Counties Youth Movement, which was led by László Toroczkai, was formed in Serbia in 2004. It advocated for separatism and the re-creation of Greater Hungary. Toroczkai was banned from entering Serbia by the government in 2008. Before forming the Sixty-Four Counties Youth Movement, Toroczkai was associated with the far-right Hungarian Justice and Life Party (MIÉP), and later served as vice-president of the ultranationalist Jobbik. Toroczkai was expelled from Jobbik, which had shifted ideologically to the centre-right, and then formed the Our Homeland Movement in 2018. By 2023, Toroczkai had shifted from his anti-Serbian stance, forming an alliance between Our Homeland Movement and the Serbian Party Oathkeepers and Dveri, and urging unity between nationalists in the two countries.

== Individuals ==
Vojislav Šešelj, the president of the Serbian Radical Party (SRS), has been noted to be the most famous far-right individual in Serbia. Alongside him, Tomislav Nikolić and Aleksandar Vučić, who were high-ranking members of SRS, were also noted as notable far-right individuals. Nikolić and Vučić abandoned the far-right after forming the populist Serbian Progressive Party (SNS) in 2008. SNS came to power in 2012, after which Serbia has suffered from democratic backsliding into authoritarianism. Šešеlj expressed support for Vučić in the 2022 election.

Individuals such as Boško Obradović, Miša Vacić, and Mladen Obradović have been described as notable far-right individuals. Vacić has been a prominent far-right individual since the 2000s, mainly due to regularly attending and organising far-right protests, as well as due to his arrests. Vacić was arrested several times for spreading hatred. Alongside him, Mladen Obradović, leader of Obraz, has received public attention due to his views. Srđan Nogo, who previously served as member of the National Assembly from 2016 to 2020, has promoted multiple far-right conspiracy theories.

Žejko Ražnatović "Arkan" was a prominent mobster associated with far-right criminal and paramilitary groups. He led a group of Belgrade criminals and was the leader of the far-right Party of Serbian Unity.

== See also ==
- Bosnian genocide denial
- Neo-fascism
- Neo-Nazism
- Radical right (Europe)
- Far-right politics in Croatia

== Sources ==
=== Books ===
- Bakić, Jovo (2013). Right-Wing Extremism in Serbia (PDF). Friedrich Ebert Foundation. ISBN 978-3-86498-463-1.
- Rrustemi, Arlinda (2020). "The Influences of Russia, Croatia, Serbia and Albania". Far-right Trends in South Eastern Europe: The Influences of Russia, Croatia, Serbia and Albania. The Hague Centre for Strategic Studies. JSTOR resrep24202.
- Petrović, Predrag; Ignjatijević, Marija; Pebić, Gorana; Starinac, Milica (2022). Migrants are Leaving, but Hatred Remains: The Anti-Migrant Extreme Right in Serbia. Belgrade: Belgrade Centre for Security Policy. ISBN 978-86-6237-214-7.
- Lažetić, Marina (2021). Migration, Extremism & Dangerous Blame Games: Developments & Dynamics in Serbia. Resolve Network. doi:10.37805/wb2021.1. S2CID 240463749. Archived from the original on 28 February 2024.
- Final Report Of The Commission of Experts Established Pursuant To Security Council Resolution 780 (PDF), United Nations Security Council, 1994
- Krajnja desnica u Srbiji 2000–2020: Politika, aktivnosti, grupe (PDF) (in Serbian). Collectivism and Equality. 2021.
- Stojarová, Věra (2012). "The Extreme Right in Croatia, Bosnia-Herzegovina and Serbia". Mapping the Extreme Right in Contemporary Europe: From Local to Transnational. Routledge. ISBN 978-0-415-50264-1.
- Pešić, Vesna (1996). Serbian Nationalism and the Origins of the Yugoslav Crisis. Vol. 31. U.S. Institute of Peace.
- Kisić, Izabela (2020). Desni Ekstremizam u Srbiji (PDF) (in Serbian). Helsinki Committee for Human Rights in Serbia.
- Batt, Judy (2005). "Front Matter". The question of Serbia (PDF). Paris: Institute for Security Studies. pp. 1–2. ISBN 978-92-9198-077-2. ISSN 1017-7566. JSTOR resrep07031.1.
- Šima, Karel (2021). From Identity Politics to the Identitarian Movement: The Europeanisation of Cultural Stereotypes?. Brill. doi:10.1163/9789004436107_006. ISBN 978-90-04-43610-7. S2CID 236580880.
- Kelly, Luke (2019). Overview of research on far right extremism in the Western Balkans. Brighton, UK: Institute of Development Studies.
- Stakić, Isidora (2011). Homophobia and Hate Speech in Serbian Public Discourse: How Nationalist Myths and Stereotypes Influence Prejudices against the LGBT Minority (Master thesis). University of Tromsø.
- Monitoring discriminatory signs and symbols in European football. 5. London: Fare Network. 2016.
- Mörner, Ninna (2021). The Many Faces of the Far Right in the Post-Communist Space: A Comparative Study of Far-Right Movements and Identity in the Region. Flemingsberg, Stockholm: Centre for Baltic and East European Studies. ISBN 978-91-85139-13-2.
- Regan, Krešimir (2007). Djelovanje Jugoslavenske radikalne zajednice u doba Banovine Hrvatske (1939-1941). Vol. 1. Studia lexicographica. pp. 217–254.
- Payne, Stanley G. (1995). A History of Fascism, 1914–1945. University of Wisconsin Press. ISBN 978-0-299-14874-4.
- Pavlowitch, Stevan (2008). Hitler's New Disorder: The Second World War in Yugoslavia. Columbia University Press. ISBN 978-0-231-70050-4.
- Tomasevich, Jozo (1975). War and Revolution in Yugoslavia, 1941–1945: The Chetniks. Stanford: Stanford University Press. ISBN 978-0-8047-0857-9.
- Byford, Jovan (2011). "Willing Bystanders: Dimitrije Ljotić, "Shield Collaboration" and the Destruction of Serbia's Jews". In the Shadow of Hitler: Personalities of the Right in Central and Eastern Europe. London: I.B. Tauris. ISBN 978-1-84511-697-2.
- LeBor, Adam (2003). Miloseivc: A Biography. A&C Black. ISBN 978-0-7475-6181-1.
- Vučićević, Damir (2017). Tito, Yugoslavia, and Communism: Historical Revisionism of the Second World War and its Competing Memories. Massachusetts: Tufts University.
- Petrović, Predrag; Stakić, Isidora (2018). Extremism Research Forum: Serbia Report. British Council. ISBN 978-0-86355-896-2.
- Spoerri, Marlene (2015). Engineering Revolution: The Paradox of Democracy Promotion in Serbia. University of Pennsylvania. ISBN 978-0-8122-4645-2.
- Džuverović, Nemanja; Stojarová, Věra (2022). Peace and Security in the Western Balkans: A Local Perspective. Abingdon-on-Thames: Taylor & Francis. doi:10.4324/9781003276661. ISBN 978-1-000-62872-2. S2CID 249104552.
- Ó Maoláin, Ciarán (1987). "Yugoslavia". The Radical right: a world directory. Harlow, GB Santa Barbara, Calif: Longman ABC-Clio. ISBN 0-582-90270-3.
- Perry, Valery (2019). Extremism and Violent Extremism in Serbia. Books on Demand. ISBN 978-3-8382-1260-9.
- Kisić, Izabela (2022). Uspon desnice: slučaj Srbija (in Serbian). Helsinki Committee for Human Rights in Serbia. ISBN 978-86-7208-224-1.
- Mitchell, Laurence (2017). Serbia. Bradt Travel Guides. ISBN 978-1-78477-056-3.
- Dörner, Wolfgang; List, Regina A. (2012). Civil Society, Conflict and Violence. London: Bloomsbury. ISBN 978-1-78093-047-3.
- McLeod, Laura (2015). Gender Politics and Security Discourse: Personal-Political Imaginations and Feminism in 'Post-conflict' Serbia. Routledge. ISBN 978-1-317-63562-8.
- Bancroft, Ian (2020). Dragon's Teeth: Tales from North Kosovo. ibidem. ISBN 978-3-8382-1364-4.
- Jelača, Dijana; Kolanović, Maša; Lugarić, Danijela (2017). The Cultural Life of Capitalism in Yugoslavia: (Post)Socialism and Its Other. Springer. ISBN 978-3-319-47482-3.
- Stjepić, Darija (2020). Hate Speech and Stereotyping in Traditional and New Media (PDF). Novi Sad: Novi Sad School of Journalism.
- Byford, Jovan (2008). Denial and Repression of Antisemitism: Post-communist Remembrance of the Serbian Bishop Nikolaj Velimirović. Central European University Press. ISBN 978-963-9776-15-9.
- Radoman, Marija (2007). Predstava o LGBT populaciji na desno-ekstremističkim web sajtovima u Srbiji (PDF). Belgrade: Faculty of Philosophy.
- Máté-Tóth, András; Rughinis, Cosima (2011). Spaces and Borders: Current Research on Religion in Central and Eastern Europe. Walter de Gruyter. ISBN 978-3-11-022814-4.
- Cvejić, Slobodan; Spasojević, Dušan; Stanojević, Dragan; Todosijević, Bojan (2020). Electoral Compass 2020: Analysis of the political landscape in Serbia (PDF). Friedrich Ebert Foundation.
- Jureković, Predrag (2016). Violent extremism in the western Balkans. Vienna: National Defence Academy. ISBN 978-3-902944-99-3. OCLC 1066091374.
- Pribićević, Ognjen (1999). Changing Fortunes of the Serbian Radical Right. Penn State. ISBN 978-0-271-01811-9.
- Bugajski, Janusz (2002). Serbian Radical Party (SRP). M.E. Sharpe. ISBN 978-1-56324-676-0.
- Mulhall, Joe; Khan-Ruf, Safya (2021). State of Hate: Far-right Extremism in Europe (PDF). HOPE not hate; Amadeu Antonio Foundation; EXPO Foundation.
- Voltmer, Katrin (2019). Media, Communication and the Struggle for Democratic Change: Case Studies on Contested Transitions. Springer. ISBN 978-3-030-16747-9.
- Bieber, Florian (2019). "Patterns of Authoritarianism". The Rise of Authoritarianism in the Western Balkans. New Perspectives on South-East Europe. pp. 31–88. doi:10.1007/978-3-030-22149-2_3. ISBN 978-3-030-22148-5. S2CID 211358655.
- Milačić, Filip (2022). Stateness and Democratic Consolidation: Lessons from Former Yugoslavia. Springer. ISBN 978-3-031-04822-7.

=== Journals ===
- Wiesinger, Barbara (2008). "The Continuing Presence of the Extreme Right in Post-Milošević Serbia". Balkanologie. 11 (1–2). doi:10.4000/balkanologie.1363.
- Mladenov Jovanović, Srđan (2018). "The Dveri Movement Through a Discursive Lens: Serbia's Contemporary Right-Wing Nationalism". Südosteuropa. 66 (4). De Gruyter Oldenbourg: 481–502. doi:10.1515/soeu-2018-0038. S2CID 158394022.
- Lažetić, Marina (2018). ""Migration Crisis" and the Far Right Networks in Europe: A Case Study of Serbia". Journal of Regional Security. 13 (2). Belgrade Centre for Security Policy: 131–178. doi:10.5937/JRS1802131L.
- Kešetović, Želimir; Ninković, Vladimir; Milašinović, Srđan (2012). "Ekstremna desnica u Srbiji i rizik desnog terorizma". Kultura Polisa (in Serbian). 9 (1). University of Belgrade: 287–309.
- Ramet, Sabrina (2010). "Serbia since July 2008: at the Doorstep of the EU". Comparative Southeast European Studies. 58. De Gruyter Oldenbourg: 15–40. doi:10.1515/soeu-2010-580105. S2CID 236535263.
- Newman, John Paul (2017). "War Veterans, Fascism, and Para-Fascist Departures in the Kingdom of Yugoslavia, 1918–1941". Fascism. 6. Brill: 42–74. doi:10.1163/22116257-00601003. S2CID 159471617.
- Bakić, Jovo (2005). "Fašizam u Jugoslaviji (1918–1941)". Nova Srpska Politička Misao. 1: 21–43. ISSN 1450-7382.
- Kindersley, R. K. (1976). "The Failure of the Chetniks". Canadian Slavonic Papers / Revue Canadienne des Slavistes. 18 (4). Taylor & Francis, Ltd.: 460–463. doi:10.1080/00085006.1976.11091469. JSTOR 40867508.
- Guzina, Dejan (2003). "Socialist Serbia's Narratives: From Yugoslavia to a Greater Serbia". International Journal of Politics, Culture, and Society. 17 (1). Springer: 91–111. doi:10.1023/A:1025341010886. JSTOR 20020199. S2CID 140426711.
- Bieber, Florian (2003). "The Serbian Opposition and Civil Society: Roots of the Delayed Transition in Serbia". International Journal of Politics, Culture, and Society. 17 (1). Springer: 73–90. doi:10.1023/A:1025388926816. JSTOR 20020198. S2CID 142950404.
- Spasić, Ivana (2008). "Serbia 2000-2008: a changing political culture?". Balkanologie: Revue d'Études Pluridisciplinaires. 11 (1–2). Association française d'études sur les Balkans. doi:10.4000/balkanologie.1282. ISSN 1965-0582.
- Kohl, Owen Nathaniel (2016). "Debating the Industrial Limits of Domestic Hip Hop". Signs and Society. 4 (2): 302–332. doi:10.1086/688642. S2CID 157071582.
- Kovačević, Predrag (2018). "Between the First and the Second Serbia: On the Political and Class Dimension of Hip-hop Subculture in Serbia". Sociološki pregled. 52 (3). Novi Sad: University of Novi Sad: 699–720. doi:10.5937/socpreg52-16767.
- Stakić, Isidora (2015). "Securitization of LGBTIQ Minorities in Serbian Farright Discourses: A Post-structuralist Perspective". Intersections. 1. Belgrade Centre for Security Policy. doi:10.17356/ieejsp.v1i1.17.
- Pavasović Trost, Tamara; Kovačević, Nikola (2013). "Football, hooliganism and nationalism: the reaction to Serbia's gay parade in reader commentary online". Sport in Society. 16 (8). Routledge: 1054–1076. doi:10.1080/17430437.2013.801224. S2CID 144835897.
- Korzeniewska-Wiszniewska, Mirella (2019). "Dynamics of the Serbian EU accession process – key issues and the challenges of state democratisation in an era of populism". Rocznik Instytutu Europy Środkowo-Wschodniej (in Polish). 17 (4). Lublin: 49–77. doi:10.36874/RIESW.2019.4.3. ISSN 1732-1395. S2CID 216381936.
- Stojarová, Věra; Vykoupilová, Hana (2008). "Populism in the Balkans: The Case of Serbia" (PDF). Stredoevropské Politické Studie. Central European Political Studies. ISSN 1212-7817. Archived from the original (PDF) on 2 February 2017.
- Mladenov Jovanović, Srđan (2020). "A New Political Scarecrow? The Political Program and Activity of the "Serbian Right"". Suvremene Teme. 11. Hrčak: 11–26. doi:10.46917/st.11.1.1. S2CID 232858193.
- Bieber, Florian (2008). "Patterns of competitive authoritarianism in the Western Balkans". East European Politics. 34 (3): 337–354. doi:10.1080/21599165.2018.1490272. S2CID 158413291.

=== News sources ===
- Stojanović, Milica (11 February 2022). "Islamism in Serbia Fading, Far-Right Extremism Growing, NGOs Warn". Balkan Insight.
- Eror, Aleks (9 February 2022). "In Serbia, A Toxic Mix of Nationalism and Animal Rights". Radio Free Europe.
- Smith, Hannah Lucinda; Pantović, Milivoje (23 March 2021). "How Europe's far-right found friends in Serbia". The Times.
- "Kosovo and the Far Right". Southern Poverty Law Center. 15 June 1999.
- "Far-right organisations attack feminist peace activists in Serbia". European Women's Lobby. 10 December 2021.
- Rujević, Nemanja (26 March 2022). "Desnica u Srbiji: Rascjepkani i jalovi u Vučićevoj igri" (in Serbian). Deutsche Welle.
- Gligorijević, Jovana (28 October 2010). "Udarne pesnice - Ko je ko na srpskoj ultradesnici" (in Serbian). Vreme.
- Zorić, Ognjen (25 January 2018). "Desno od Vučića i naprednjaka". Radio Free Europe (in Serbian).
- Todorović, Aleksandar (15 June 2021). "Vacić u Rimu, strani ultradesničari u Srbiji: Posle skupa u Italiji otvoreno pitanje umrežavanja ekstremista" (in Serbian). Euronews.
- Veljan, Nejra (10 May 2022). "Ekstremno polaganje prava: kako krajnja desnica koristi mizoginiju i antifeminizam za regrutovanje novih pristalica?" (in Serbian). Balkan Insight.
- Popović, Veljko (9 May 2020). "Na Dan pobede: Koji elementi fašizma i danas žive i ima li ih u Srbiji?". Glas Amerike (in Serbian). Voice of America.
- Bursać, Dragan (29 June 2019). "Fašistički poklič 'Srbija Srbima!'" (in Serbian). Al Jazeera.
- Cvetković, Ljudmila; Bogdanović, Nevena (13 November 2021). "Kako se štiti Mladićev mural u Beogradu: Danonoćne straže i bezbojni lak". Radio Free Europe (in Serbian).
- Diković, Jovana (24 November 2021). "Pivske flaše i prazne stolice "čuvaju" mural Ratka Mladića" (in Serbian). Danas.
- Traynor, Ian (13 October 2010). "Serbian thugs are the toys of nationalist and neo-fascist leaders". The Guardian.
- Pejić, Irena (12 May 2021). "Fascist song recited at the solemn celebration of the Victory Day over Fascism in Serbia". Mašina.
- Vio, Eleonora (19 November 2019). "Young Patriots: Serbia's Role in the European Far-right". Balkan Insight.
- Eror, Aleks (5 June 2022). "The Far-Right Parties Keeping The Serbian President In Check Over Ukraine". Radio Free Europe.
- Tomić, Đorđe (11 January 2014). "Serbia's Radical Right and Homophobia". Unique.
- Coloborne, Michael (18 November 2020). "An American White Supremacist's New Home in Serbia". Bellingcat.
- Kekić, Gojko (22 July 2021). "Antisemitism in Serbia – then and now". Terraforming.
- Sorguč, Albina; Rovčanin, Haris (5 February 2021). "Serb Chetniks' Links to War Criminals and Extremists Uncovered". Balkan Insight.
- "Serbia Expels Hungarian Far Right Activist". Balkan Insight. 14 May 2008.
- "Parada ponosa - "prst u oko" desničarima" (in Serbian). Balkan Insight. 17 September 2009.
- "Serbia seeks far-right bans after gay pride threat". Reuters. 25 September 2009.
- Ilić, Aleksa (18 March 2020). "¿No pasarán? - The rise of the extreme right wing in Serbian politics". European Policy Centre.
- Subotić, Nedeljko (19 February 2018). "Serbian hip-hop: how the music of the streets turned towards post-war nationalism". The Calvert Journal.
- Nikoletić, I. (18 October 2021). "Ekstremna desnica u Srbiji na državnom budžetu" (in Serbian). Danas.
- Komarčević, Dušan (14 October 2021). "'Hang Them From Trees': Serbian Far-Right Group Targets Hostel Owner For Welcoming Migrants". Radio Free Europe.
- Barlovac, Bojana (4 October 2011). "Serbia's Constitutional Court Monitors Rightists". Balkan Insight.
- Glavonjić, Zoran (12 June 2012). "Ustavni sud Srbije zabranio "Obraz"". Radio Free Europe (in Serbian).
- Dragojlo, Saša (8 April 2022). "BIRN Fact-Check: Did Serbia's Elections Signal a Further Tilt to the Right". Balkan Insight.
- Kojić, Nikola (5 June 2020). "Izbori 2012: Poraz Tadića i DS, Dačićev preokret i dolazak SNS na vlast" (in Serbian). N1.
- Bilefsky, Dan (30 July 2008). "Karadzic Sent to Hague for Trial Despite Violent Protest by Loyalists". New York Times.
- "Mladic: Serbia police on alert for nationalist protests". BBC News. 29 May 2011.
- "CeSID: SNS na 49%, cenzus za još šest lista" (in Serbian). B92. 25 April 2016.
- Pejić, Irena (6 March 2020). "Boosting the anti-migrant right". Mašina.
- Bieber, Florian (7 July 2020). "Conspiratorial Corona: Hoaxes and Conspiracy Theories in the Balkans". Graz: Balkan Insight.
- Mrenović, Lav (2 December 2020). "Who has a problem with artists?". Mašina.
- "Coronavirus: Belgrade protesters storm Serb parliament over curfew". BBC News. 8 July 2020.
- Stojanović, Milica (8 July 2020). "Serbian President Blames Belgrade Violence on Far-Right Extremists". Balkan Insight.
- Marković, Tomislav (6 April 2020). "Teorije zavjere: Ko nam je smjestio COVID-19?" (in Serbian). Al Jazeera.
- Popović, Aleksandra (29 January 2021). "Vakcina iz ugla opozicije – šta kažu stranke i političari koji su protiv režima" (in Serbian). Talas.
- "Centar za bezbednost i krizne situacije EJC - Antisemitizam i kriza zbog korona virusa" (in Serbian). Federation of Jewish Communities of Serbia. 28 April 2020.
- Komarčević, Dušan (22 July 2022). "Za EU opasnost, za Beograd 'njet': Veze ultradesničara iz Srbije i Rusije". Radio Free Europe (in Serbian).
- "Ministry in bid to shut down Obraz". B92. 28 February 2009.
- Komarčević, Dušan (1 June 2020). "Desničarska organizacija Obraz zaobišla ustavnu zabranu" (in Serbian). Radio Free Europe.
- Valtner, Lidija (12 January 2022). "I "Obraz" u referendumskoj kampanji" (in Serbian). Danas.
- Bogdanović, Nevena (12 October 2020). "Grupe i organizacije iza zabranjenog koncerta u Beogradu". Radio Free Europe (in Serbian).
- "Nova stranka: Tepić i Živković podneli inicijativu za zabranu NSF" (in Serbian). Novinska agencija Beta. 5 December 2017.
- "Konzervativni pokret Naši objavio: Manojlović zastupa interese stranog uticaja u Srbiji?" (in Serbian). B92. 15 July 2022.
- Leđenac, Maja (20 January 2018). "Vođa Srbke Časti napadao prošlog leta i ekipu NDNV-a u Nišu" (in Serbian). Vojvođanski istraživačko-analitički centar.
- Stojanović, Milan (19 September 2019). ""Srbska čast", aktivisti i vlasnik se dogovorili – konj se vraća u Zvezdu". N1 (in Serbian).
- Stojanović, Dušan (22 June 2022). "Explainer: Western Balkans' promised EU future still hazy". Associated Press.
- Borger, Julian (12 January 2018). "Russian-trained mercenaries back Bosnia's Serb separatists". The Guardian.
- "Ko su članovi Srbske Akcije: Osnivač i idejni vođa pravnik!" (in Serbian). Kurir. 5 December 2014.
- "Neonacisti upali na tribinu u Muzeju Vojvodine" (in Serbian). 021.rs. 21 November 2015.
- von Ahn, Thomas (7 May 2007). "Democracy or the street?". Eurozine.
- "Omladinski pokret 64 županije" (in Serbian). B92. 14 June 2004.
- "Who is Jovana Stojkovic, an anti-vaxxer and an anti-masker protester?". B92. 1 April 2021.
- "Right-wingers organise a rally in front of a migrant reception centre in support of an arrested member of far-right organisation Levijatan". Mašina. 15 May 2020.
- Gascón Barberá, Marcel; Ciobanu, Claudia; Malichudis, Stavros; Vladisavljević, Anja; Inotai, Edit; Stojanović, Milica; Todorov, Svetoslav (19 January 2021). "Religious Strain of Anti-Vax Grows In CEE". Balkan Insight.
- Anđelković, Nataša (3 December 2021). "Srbija, politika i izbori: Ko čini političke kolone - jednostavan vodič" (in Serbian). BBC News.
- "DJB: Posle Stamatovića našu deklaraciju podržali Jovana Stojković i Čedomir Antić" (in Serbian). Danas. 13 December 2021.
- "RIK: Rezultati parlamentarnih izbora sa 98,73 odsto biračkih mesta, lista SNS ima 120 mandata" (in Serbian). Danas. 6 April 2022.
- Nikolić, Maja (11 November 2021). "Crtaju mete, ometaju novinare – ko su Narodne patrole i zašto ih vlast "ne vidi"" (in Serbian). N1.
- Mitrović, Nemanja (9 March 2020). "Narodne patrole: Ko patrolira Beogradom u potrazi za migrantima" (in Serbian). BBC News.
- "Na poziv desničara skup protiv NATO-a i podrška Rusiji u Beogradu". Radio Free Europe (in Serbian). 24 March 2022.
- "Protest zbog glasanja Srbije protiv Rusije u UN" (in Serbian). Politika. 15 April 2022.
- Orlović, Slaviša (26 October 2008). "Desni centar sa dvojcem bez kormilara" (in Serbian). Politika.
- Gligorijević, Jovana (5 October 2011). "Pobednici sramne bitke" (in Serbian). Vreme.
- "SPC i desnica" (in Serbian). B92. 22 June 2005.
- "Ko je ko na desnici" (in Serbian). Politika. 2 August 2008.
- Skrozza, Tamara (15 December 2005). "Bez đona i obraza" (in Serbian). Vreme.
- "Boško Obradović" (in Serbian). Istinomer. 2020.
- "Pokret "Dveri" postaje politička stranka" (in Serbian). RTV Šabac. 19 February 2015.
- "Dveri srpske: Izlazimo na izbore, ali nismo stranka" (in Serbian). Radio Television of Vojvodina. 10 February 2011.
- Dobrilović, Jasmina (10 May 2020). "Dveri ne izlaze na izbore, ali poručuju da je bojkot mrtav" (in Serbian). NOVA portal.
- "Ukupni rezultati parlamentarnih izbora" (in Serbian). Radio Television of Serbia. 5 May 2016.
- Cvetković, Ljudmila; Nikitović, Vladimir (19 December 2019). "Savez za Srbiju se ne ograđuje od antimigrantske inicijative Dveri". Radio Free Europe (in Serbian).
- "Dveri: Na parlamentarnim izborima 3,9%, u Beogradu 3,5 odsto" (in Serbian). Radio Television of Vojvodina. 4 April 2022.
- Crosby, Alan (18 March 2019). "Belgrade Bedfellows: Divergent Aims, Styles Laid Bare As Serbia's Anti-Vucic Protests Intensify". Radio Free Europe.
- "Factbox: Parties running in Serbia's general election". Reuters. 24 April 2016.
- "Zavetnici i Dveri formirali blok protiv sankcija Rusiji" (in Serbian). Radio Television of Serbia. 13 April 2022.
- "Hundreds Of Gay Rights Activists March In Belgrade". Radio Free Europe. 28 September 2014.
- "Rusija i Vladimir Žirinovski: Preminuo lider ekstremne desnice" (in Serbian). BBC News. 6 April 2022.
- "Izbori 2012: Rezultati i postizborna trgovina" (in Serbian). Vreme. 10 May 2012.
- Domanović, Milka; Ristić, Marija (12 November 2014). "Vojislav Seselj Returns to Serbia After 11 Years". Belgrade: Balkan Insight.
- Cvetković, Ljudmila (4 April 2022). "Dobitnici i gubitnici izbora u Srbiji". Radio Free Europe (in Serbian).
- Ottaway, David (22 October 1993). "President of Serbia dissolves Parliament". The Washington Post.
- Traynor, Ian (12 June 2004). "Hardliner looks set to win poll in Serbia". The Guardian.
- Mardell, Mark (25 January 2007). "Europe diary: Serbian Radicals". BBC News.
- "Šešelj: Srbija da odustane od EU, decenijama propada zbog evrointegracija" (in Serbian). N1. 26 March 2022.
- "RIK objavila konačne rezultate predsedničkih izbora" (in Serbian). Euronews. 9 May 2022.
- Lalatović, Jelena (18 June 2020). "Zašto je opasno ne shvatiti koaliciju "Pokret Levijatan – živim za Srbiju" ozbiljno" (in Serbian). Mašina.
- Kuloglija, Nermina; Husarić, Azra (3 December 2021). "Far-Right Exploiting Pandemic to Spread Hate, in the Balkans Too". Sarajevo: Balkan Insight.
- Živanović, Katarina (22 April 2019). "Neki optužuju Levijatan za saradnju sa SNS". Danas.
- "Warlord's party hopeful of winning seats". CNN. 24 December 2000.
- Božić Krainčanić, Svetlana (4 March 2020). "Izborna godina u Srbiji: 20 godina parlamentarizma" (in Serbian). Radio Free Europe.
- "Milica Đurđević Stamenkovski" (in Serbian). Istinomer. 2020.
- Crosby, Alan (12 March 2018). "Serbian Ultranationalists Making Mark Despite Failure At The Ballot Box". Radio Free Europe.
- "Migranti i vakcina glavne teme za desnicu u Srbiji" (in Serbian). Boom93. 16 March 2020. Archived from the original on 14 June 2022.
- Ivković, Aleksandar (18 March 2019). "Who is leading the escalating protests in Serbia?". European Western Balkans.
- Bilefsky, Dan (2 May 2008). "Tomislav Nikolic, far right leader in Serbia, follows own path". New York Times.
- "Velika Srbija nerealna" (in Serbian). Radio Television of Serbia. 30 October 2008.
- "Nikolić: Službeno osnovana Srpska napredna stranka". Radio Free Europe (in Serbian). 10 October 2008.
- "Šešelj: Na ovim izborima nameravam da podržim Vučića za predsednika" (in Serbian). Nedeljnik. 25 February 2022.
- Wood, Nicholas (24 September 2004). "Cabby's a Politician, Taking Voters for a Ride. Honestly". New York Times.
- "Jobbik expels Toroczkai". Daily News Hungary. 8 June 2018.
- András, Kovács (27 September 2016). "Toroczkai László: szélsőségek, titkosszolgálatok, Jobbik-alelnökség" (in Hungarian). Origo.
- Sarnyai, Gábor (25 June 2018). "Brand New Far-Right Party Emerges from the Ashes of Jobbik". Hungary Today. Archived from the original on 29 May 2019.
- Ispanović, Igor (16 February 2022). "French Connection: 'Humanitarian' Far-Right Claims Kosovo as Cautionary Tale". Balkan Insight.
- Tregoures, Loïc (11 July 2019). "Kosovo, the global far right, and the threat to liberalism". European Council on Foreign Relations.
- Bogdanović, Nevena (27 November 2020). "Arno Gujon - od ekstremne desnice do funkcije u Vladi Srbije". Radio Free Europe (in Serbian).
- Đureinović, Jelena (31 March 2021). "Why Do the Radical Right And Populists In Serbia Celebrate Antifascism?". Centre for Analysis of the Radical Right. Archived from the original on 6 July 2022.
- Robinson, Matt (14 May 2015). "Serbia rehabilitates WWII royalist killed for collaborating with Nazis". Reuters.
- "Belgrade holds Pride march as far-right groups clash with police". Al Jazeera. 17 September 2022.
- "Far-right violence at pride march in Serbia". EUobserver. 19 September 2022.
- Tang, Isaac Chakyan (22 April 2022). "Echoes of a Turbulent Past: Turbo Folk War Music in Serbia". Harvard International Review.
- Tika, Vera (19 October 2022). "Kosovo Issue Has Expanded Serbian Far-Right's Global Reach". Balkan Insight.
- Komarčević, Dušan (14 December 2022). "Pod maskama u Beogradu 'brane' Kosovo". Radio Free Europe (in Serbian).
- "Ultradesničari izlepili plakate po Somboru, pozivaju na linč onih koji pomažu migrantima" (in Serbian). Danas. 10 October 2021.
- Stojsavljević, Vojislav (19 January 2023). "Čedomir Stojković podneo krivične prijave: Vulin dao smernice da se delovanje Vagner grupe ne sprečava, Damnjan Knežević pristupio organizaciji". Danas.
- "Jovana Stojković i njen pokret prešli u Stamatovićevu Zdravu Srbiju". Danas (in Serbian). 22 April 2023.
- "Predsednik Dveri podneo ostavku zbog neuspeha na izborima u Srbiji". Radio Free Europe (in Serbian). 23 December 2023.
- "Neonacisti obeležili smrt Milana Nedića u Beogradu". Radio Free Europe (in Serbian). 4 February 2023.
- "Poslednji podaci RIK-a i PIK-a: SNS blizu 50 odsto, Dveri i Zavetnici ispod cenzusa". N1 (in Serbian). 18 December 2023.
- "Nekada kritikovale Vučića i SNS "s desna i s leva", a sada će biti ministarke u novoj vladi". N1 (in Serbian). 30 April 2024.
- Hodžić, Enes (16 November 2022). "BIRN Launches Interactive Map of Far-Right and Extremist Groups". Balkan Insight.
- "Serbia". Balkan Investigative Reporting Network. 16 November 2022.
- "Serbian Far-Right Protesters Try To Break Through Police Cordons Into Kosovo". Radio Free Europe. 18 December 2022.
- "Ekstremna desnica u Srbiji ugošćuje Italijane i bori se za Ruse: Opasne ideje se šire i na Istok i na Zapad". Euronews (in Serbian). 30 October 2022.
- Dautović, Mirko (5 January 2024). "Serbia's Elections – Defeat for Far Right, as well as Moderate Opposition". Balkan Insight.
- Gec, Jovana (27 June 2024). "Serbian Police Ban Cultural Festival With Kosovo As Pressure Mounts On Liberal Voices". Associated Press.
- "Nacionalno okupljanje i evropske suvernističke stranke za formiranje saveza zbog migrantske krize" [National Gathering and European sovereignist parties to form an alliance due to the migrant crisis]. Novinska agencija Beta (in Serbian). 9 December 2023. "Lideri koalicije "Nacionalno okupljanje" Milica Đurđević Stamenkovski i Boško Obradović ocenili su na današnjem skupu u Beogradu, zajedno sa predstavnicima nekoliko nacionalno orijentisanih evropskih stranaka, da je neophodno formirati širi savez suverenističkih snaga kako bi se zaustavila migrantska kriza. ... Predsednik mađarske stranke Moja domovina Torockaj Laslo ocenio je da, ukoliko ne dođe do tog ujedinjenja, da će "Evropa i evropski narodi prestati da postoje". [The leaders of the "National Gathering" coalition, Milica Djurdjevic Stamenkovski and Bosko Obradovic, assessed at today's gathering in Belgrade, together with representatives of several nationally oriented European parties, that it is necessary to form a broader alliance of sovereignist forces in order to stop the migrant crisis. ... The president of the Hungarian Our Homeland party, Toroczkai Laszlo, said that if this unification does not take place, "Europe and European nations will cease to exist.]"
