= Obraz =

Obraz may refer to:

- Face (sociological concept), a traditional South Slavic expression for honor
- Obraz (organization), a nationalist organization from Serbia, banned since 2012
- Dragan Nikolić, co-host of the 1970s Serbian television show Obraz uz obraz (Cheek to cheek)
