= Oto Bihalji-Merin =

Yugoslav writer and art historian (1904–1993)

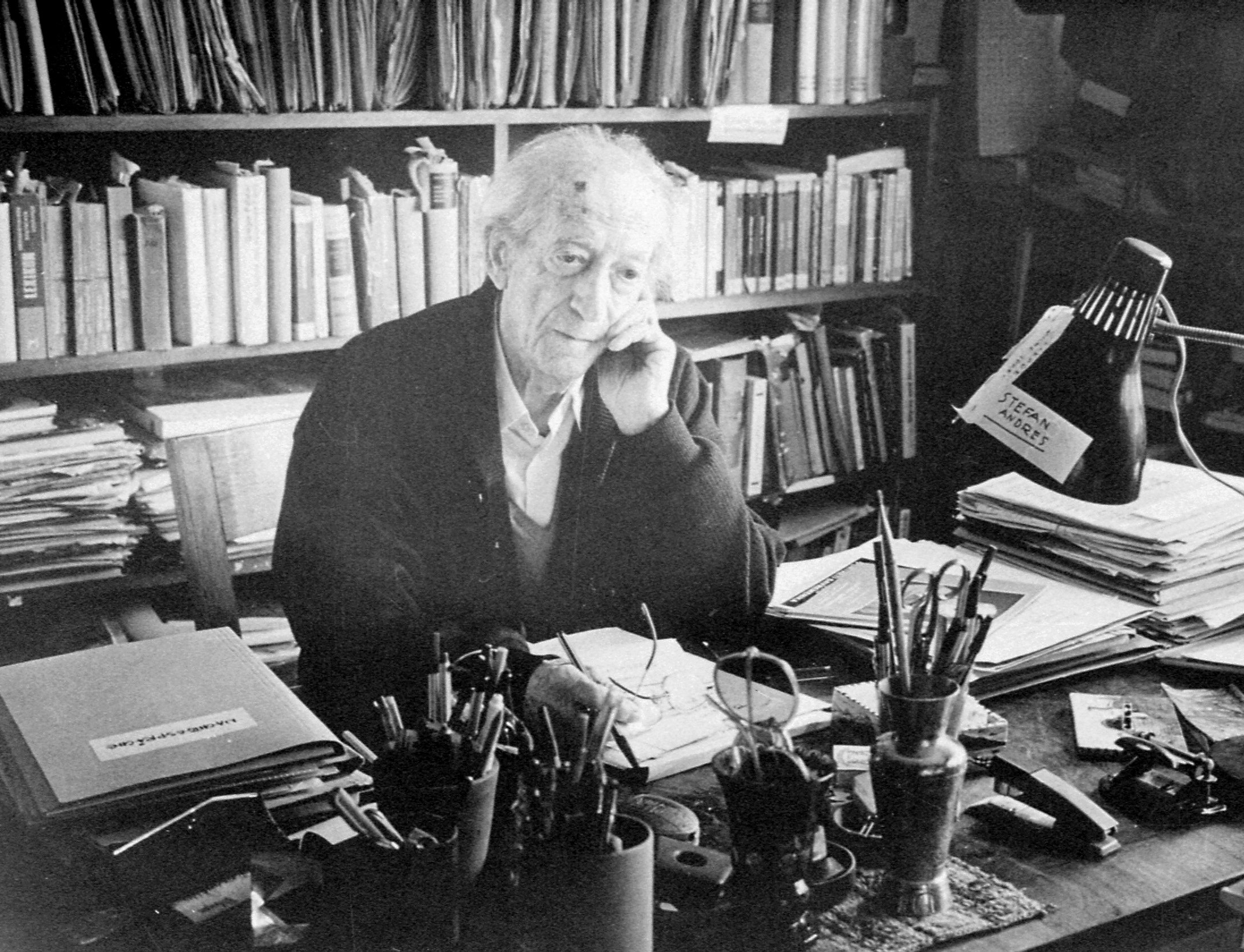
- Bihalji-Merin in the early 1990s
- Born: 3 January 1904; Zemun, Croatia-Slavonia, Austria-Hungary
- Died: 22 December 1993 (aged 89); Belgrade, Serbia, FR Yugoslavia
- Occupations: Art historian, art critic, writer
- Awards: Herder Prize (1964)

Oto Bihalji-Merin (Serbian Cyrillic: Ото Бихаљи Мерин; 3 January 1904 – 22 December 1993) was a Serbian writer, art historian, painter and art critic.

== Biography ==
Bihalji-Merin was born to a Jewish family in Zemun, then an Austro-Hungarian town on the very border with Kingdom of Serbia. After finishing high school he first enrolled at the University of Belgrade to study painting in 1924, before later continuing his studies in Berlin at the Unified State Schools for Fine and Applied Arts (German: Vereinigte Staatsschulen für freie und angewandte Kunst). In Berlin, he started working as an art critic and journalist for magazines Illustrierte Neuen Welt and later Die Linkskurve, which was a publication formed by a group of left-wing intellectuals. In 1924 Bihalji-Merin joined the Communist Party of Yugoslavia.

He returned to Belgrade in 1928 and became a pilot in the Royal Yugoslav Air Force. At the same time, Bihalji-Merin founded the Nova literatura magazine (1928–29) and the Nolit publishing house together with his brother Pavle. Nolit began publishing works by Jack London, Maxim Gorky, Erich Maria Remarque, Heinrich Mann, Sinclair Lewis, John Steinbeck, and Isaac Babel. The Yugoslav state censors at the time often considered these books provocative for promoting leftist ideas, which led to bans and confiscations. Because of an inherited heart condition, he was fired from the Air Force, after which he returned to Berlin and continued to work as a journalist and editor.

In Berlin in the early 1930s he witnessed the rise of German National Socialism, and in 1933 he moved to Paris, where he founded an Institute for the Study of Fascism with Arthur Koestler and Manès Sperber. In 1934 he joined the Communist Party of Germany. Although he continued to publish articles in the German press, he started using various pseudonyms, most often signing his articles as Pierre Merin or Peter Thoene. By 1936 Bihalji-Merin split his time between living in France and Switzerland. In 1936 he left for Spain to join the Republicans in the Spanish Civil War. Following the Republicans' defeat in April 1939, Bihalji-Merin returned to the Kingdom of Yugoslavia.

Following the short invasion of Yugoslavia in April 1941, he was captured as a Yugoslav prisoner of war by the German Army. His knowledge of German language and the fact that he mostly published his articles using pseudonyms have saved his life during internment, although his brother Pavle was arrested and shot by occupying forces immediately in the aftermath of the invasion. After World War II ended Bihalji-Merin returned to Belgrade and remained to live in the same apartment in the city centre for the rest of his life.

Bihalji-Merin authored dozens of books, mostly dealing with arts and mostly published in German. After witnessing Nazi persecution of modernist artists in Germany in the 1930s, he is credited with penning the first history of modern art in Germany, published in 1938 by Penguin Books, featuring a foreword by Herbert Read. After the war he was editor of Belgrade-based Borba, the communist party's official newspaper.

In the aftermath of World War II, when art circles in Yugoslavia were pressured to adopt the socialist realism state-approved policies of the Soviet Union, Bihalji-Merin used his influence to defend modernist and naïve art styles. For this reason he is thought to have been instrumental in Yugoslavia's departure from the Soviet-style populist and heavily politically influenced visual arts. He also kept a lifelong interest in expressionist art which had flourished in Germany in the interwar period of his youth before Nazis came to power and labelled it degenerate art.

Between 1949 and 1959 Bihalji-Merin was editor of a state-owned illustrated arts magazine, Jugoslavija. In the decades after the war he published a number of books promoting Yugoslav cultural heritage, especially on the topics of naïve homegrown artists like Ivan Generalić, the medieval Bosnian stećak tombstones as well as abstract painters such as Vangel Naumoski. He was a member of the international experts commission which organised the Fifty Years of Modern Art exhibition and is credited with securing unprecedented exposure for Yugoslav art at the 1958 World Fair in Brussels.

In the 1950s and early 1960s he wrote several short art documentaries produced by Avala Film, including two about the works of sculptor Toma Rosandić. As an art critic, he was one of the early proponents of the view that the modern scientific discoveries such as the theory of relativity, psychoanalysis, photography and new developments in technology enabling observations of the micro and macro worlds around us all work to expand our notion of reality, resulting in a radically changed perspective of artists, as well as the role of art itself. Bihalji-Merin also wrote fiction, including a 1947 novel titled Goodbye in October (Serbian: Doviđenja u oktobru) based on his World War II experiences as a prisoner of war, which was then adapted into a 1950 Yugoslav feature film titled The Red Flower, starring Dragomir Felba and Milivoje Živanović. He also published plays, travel writing and a memoir of his time in the Spanish Civil War, titled Spain Between Death and Birth (Španija između smrti i rađanja).

In 1964 he was one of the four inaugural recipients of the Herder Prize, an international humanities award presented at the University of Vienna to scholars from Southeast Europe. He was also awarded the Belgian Order of Leopold. Late in his life Bihalji-Merin started writing his autobiography, titled My Beautiful Life in Hell (Serbian: Moj lepi život u paklu) but did not manage to finish it by the time of his death in December 1993 at 89 years of age.

He is the grand-uncle of a Serbian animal rights activist and a far-right ultranationalist politician, Pavle Bihali.

== See also ==
- List of Serbian painters
