= Pavle Bihali =

Serbian politician (born 1982)

- Павле Бихали
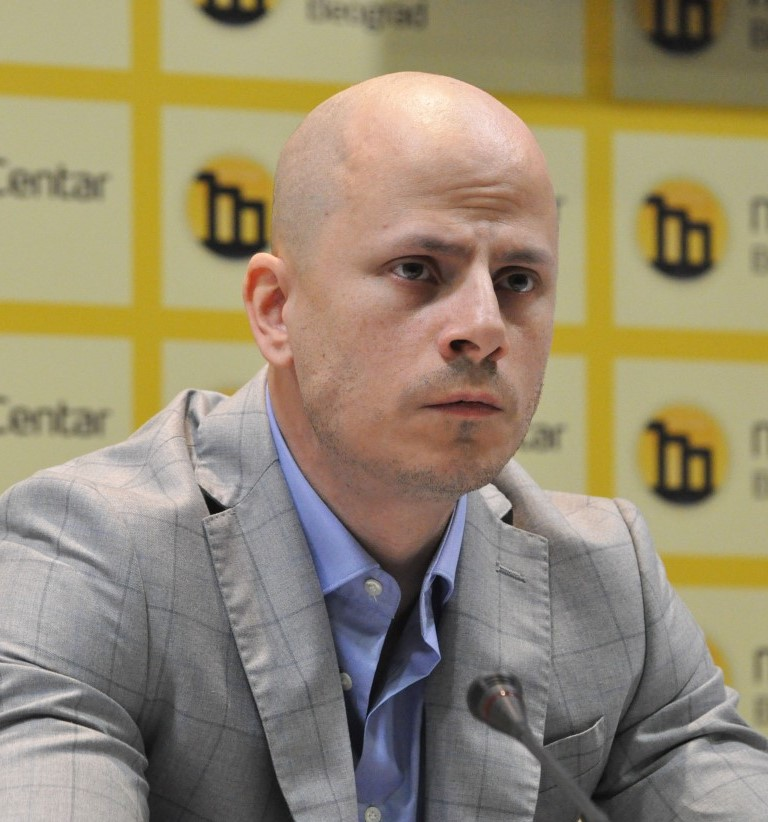
- Bihali in 2020

Personal details
- Born: 29 January 1982 (age 44) Belgrade, SR Serbia, Yugoslavia
- Party: Leviathan Movement
- Relatives: Oto Bihalji-Merin (grand-uncle)
- Occupation: Activist; politician

Pavle Bihali Gavrin (Serbian Cyrillic: Павле Бихали Гаврин, born 29 January 1982) is a Serbian far-right politician, animal rights activist, and the leader of the neo-fascist Leviathan Movement.

== Early life ==
Bihali was born in 1982 in Belgrade into a Serbian-Jewish family. According to the official documents, his grandfather, Pavle Bihali, a Communist writer and translator and the founder of the Nolit publishing house, was executed by the Gestapo in 1941 during the Nazi German occupation of Serbia during World War II; however, he claims that the Yugoslav communists killed him. He is the grand-nephew of the late Yugoslav, and Serbian academic, Oto Bihalji-Merin. As a child, he played a minor role in a Serbian TV series, Srećni ljudi. In 2004, he was a candidate of the Strength of Serbia Movement for the local elections.

== Leviathan ==
In 2015, he founded the Leviathan Movement, an animal right organization. Since then, the organization quickly got attention and it became the largest animal rights organization in former Yugoslavia. In 2016, the movement became popular when videos of the members of organization rescuing animals showed up on social media, as well as videos of them offering compensation for information on animal abusers. Initially, the movement only focused on animal rights issues, exposing animal abusers, and taking their animals away from them. However, the movement has shifted from solely being an animal rights group to openly talking about political issues, mainly illegal immigration. In 2020, the organization announced that they will be forming a party that will participate in the 2020 Serbian parliamentary election. The party since then has been described as ultranationalist, neo-fascist and anti-immigration by the media. He received second position on a combined electoral list of the Leviathan, and the "I Live for Serbia" movement for the 2020 election.

== Controversies ==
In 2018, Bihali was arrested for making threats on Facebook. Even after this, he continued threatening people on social media, including minors. In April 2020, members of the movement took the family dog of a Romani family in Dorćol away from them claiming that the dog was abused, and that it was used for dog fights, however, this claim was denied by the people living in the neighbourhood. Though he has Jewish heritage, he has been described as a neo-Nazi for having the 3rd SS Panzer Division Totenkopf tattoo. He has also been criticized for having relations with the mafia after he posted a photo of himself wearing a shirt with the image of Luka Bojović, a Serbian criminal. He defended himself by saying that the family of Bojović helped raise him as he didn't have contact with his family for almost twenty years. He also glorifies Milorad Ulemek, who was convicted of the assassinations of Serbian Prime Minister Zoran Đinđić and former Serbian President Ivan Stambolić.
