= Leviathan Movement =

Political party in Serbia

Leviathan Movement Покрет Левијатан
- President: Pavle Bihali
- Founded: 2015
- Registered: 2020
- Headquarters: Belgrade
- Ideology: Neo-fascism
- Political position: Far-right
- Colours: Black
- National Assembly: 0 / 250
- Assembly of Vojvodina: 0 / 120
- City Assembly of Belgrade: 0 / 110

Party flag

Website
- levijatan.org

The Leviathan Movement (Serbian: Покрет Левијатан, romanised: Pokret Levijatan) is a neo-fascist political organisation in Serbia, that presents itself as an animal rights organisation. It is led by Pavle Bihali.

== History ==
The organisation was formed in 2015 as an animal rights group, focused on safeguarding of stray dogs. In 2016, the movement became popular when videos of the members of organisation rescuing animals showed up on social media, as well as videos of them offering compensation for information on animal abusers. Initially, the movement only focused on animal rights issues, exposing animal abusers, and taking their animals away from them. However, the movement has shifted from solely being an animal rights group to openly talking about political issues, mainly illegal immigration. In 2020, the organisation announced that they will be forming a party that will participate in the 2020 parliamentary election, in a coalition with the far-right anti-vax "I live for Serbia" movement.

Its leader, Pavle Bihali, appeared under a Russian minority ballot list for the 2022 election which was ultimately rejected by the Republic Electoral Commission (RIK) because it did not collect enough valid signatures. According to CeSID, the ballot list did not support minority rights, but far-right politics. This was later overturned by the Constitutional Court, and on 22 March, RIK confirmed the ballot list. The list did not enter parliament.

In July 2023, the Constitutional Court of Serbia received a proposal from the Public Prosecutor's Office to ban Leviathan. According to the Public Prosecutor's Office of Serbia, Leviathan is a "paramilitary citizens association" and has been "aiming at violating guaranteed human or minority rights and caused racial, national and religious hatred".

== Ideology and controversies ==
Leviathan has been described as neo-fascist, neo-Nazi, and alt-right party, and it is positioned on the far-right on the political spectrum. It has been heavily criticised for its anti-human rights behaviour. It has been also described as a satellite party of the Serbian Progressive Party. In November 2018, the leaders of the movement, Pavle Bihali and Aleksandar Buhanac were arrested for making threats on Facebook, but soon after they were released. Even after this, he continued threatening people on social media, including minors. Leviathan has targeted minorities (mainly Roma), immigrants, the LGBT community, and Leviathan's political opponents. Its rhetoric has been described as xenophobic. It also support anti-vax politics.

In April 2020, members of the movement took the family dog of a Romani family away from them, claiming that the dog was abused and that it was used for dog fights. However this claim was denied by the people living in the neighbourhood. Not long after, a member of Leviathan drove through the gate of a refugee camp in Obrenovac, threatening to run over the refugees. After the attacker was arrested, the members of the movement protested in front of the camp.

In October 2020, police in Belgrade have arrested six members of Leviathan who are suspected of beating one person earlier that month.

== Electoral results ==
=== Parliamentary elections ===
National Assembly of Serbia
Year	Leader	Popular vote	% of popular vote	# of seats	Seat change	Coalitions	Government
2020	Pavle Bihali	22,691	0.7%	0 / 250	Steady	with I live for Serbia	No seats
2022	Pavle Bihali	9,569	0.25%	0 / 250	Steady	Serbo-Russian Movement (As part of Russian Minority Alliance)	No seats

== See also ==
- Far-right politics in Serbia
