= Jugoslavija (magazine) =

Illustrated biannual arts magazine in Yugoslavia (1949–1959)

- Editor: Oto Bihalji-Merin
- Categories: Illustrated arts magazine
- Frequency: Biannual
- Founded: 1949
- First issue: Fall 1949
- Final issue: 1959
- Country: Yugoslavia
- Based in: Belgrade
- Language: Multilingual
- ISSN: 1821-2360
- OCLC: 780578788

Jugoslavija was a Yugoslav multilingual illustrated arts magazine published between 1949 and 1959. Its full title in English was Yugoslavia: An Illustrated Magazine. The magazine was based in Belgrade. The magazine was a propaganda publication which included articles on arts and advertising illustrations.

== History and content ==
The first issue of Jugoslavija was published in Fall 1949. The founding editor of the illustrated magazine was Oto Bihalji-Merin. He was a Serbian writer, art historian and curator. The magazine was published biannually in Serbo-Croatian, English and German. Later French and Russian language editions were added. The magazine was distributed abroad, since its goal was to present sociopolitical situation, national treasures and touristic places of Yugoslavia to the Western readers. It also contained articles reflecting Balkan culture. It also covered articles on the history of Yugoslavia.

Some volumes of Jugoslavija were dedicated to single republics within Yugoslavia, including Bosnia and Herzegovina, Macedonia and Slovenia which had either small population or were located at the far end of the country or had a multicultural structure. However, the magazine never featured Croatia or Serbia of which population was dominant in the federation.

Oto Bihalji-Merin edited the magazine until 1959 when it ceased publication.
