= Nacionalni stroj =

Neo-nazi organisation in Serbia

Flag of the National Alignment

Nacionalni stroj (Serbian Cyrillic: Национални строј, National Alignment) was a neo-Nazi organization in Serbia, based in the Vojvodina Region. It had orchestrated several incidents since 2005. In late 2005, charges were pressed against 18 of the leading members in Novi Sad, and each of the suspects were facing up to eight years in prison. It was banned in Serbia in 2011.

== See also ==
- Serbian nationalism
