= Nebojša M. Krstić =

Serbian theologian and sociologist

- Born: 28 August 1964; Niš, SFR Yugoslavia
- Died: 3 December 2001 (aged 37); Highway between Niš and Leskovac, FR Yugoslavia
- Occupations: theologian and sociologist
- Known for: founding and presiding over the Serbian far-right youth organization Obraz

Nebojša M. Krstić (Serbian Cyrillic: Небојша М. Крстић; 28 August 1964 – 3 December 2001) was a Serbian theologian and sociologist.

Krstić was the founder and first president of the Serbian far-right youth organization Obraz (Honor), that was banned in June 2012. The name of the movement was taken from the magazine Obraz from which this movement emerged.

== Early life ==
Krstić was born on 28 August 1964 to father Milutin and mother Ružica.

== Theological and political work ==
Jovan Byford referred to him as a controversial right-wing antisemitic young theologian. Klaus Buchenau described Krstić, editor of journal Svetigora and contributor to journal Pravoslavlje, as charismatic leader who struggled against the New World Order. In 1991 Krstić received the Saint Sava Award from the Patriarch of the Serbian Orthodox Church Pavle for his philosophical-theological work Pojam Logosa kod Svetog Jovana Bogoslova and in 1993 he was awarded by the Yugoslav Society for Scientific Research of the Religion for the best work on theology published in 1993.

Buchenau explained that Krstić propagated a union of the Balkan countries with majority of Orthodox Christian population (like Balkan League in the First Balkan War) and recapture of the supposedly Serb territories lost during the Yugoslav Wars of the 1990s. Dragan Subotić emphasized that Krstić supported the position of bishop Nikolaj Velimirović, who believed that three bases of Serbdom are God, the King and the home (family). In an interview given in March 2001 Krstić rejected accusation that he was pro-fascist and confirmed that he was an admirer of "Serbian martyrs" Dragoljub Mihailović, Milan Nedić and Dimitrije Ljotić. In August 2001 Krstić announced that he was going to sue Helsinki Committee for Human Rights because this organization accused Obraz for antisemitism. He also emphasized that number of members of Obraz movement had reached more than 30,000 and was increasing.

== Death and legacy ==
On 3 December 2001 Krstić died in a car accident, which was perceived by his supporters as a politically motivated assassination. After his death Obraz broke into two different factions and lost its significance. The only faction which continued with its activities after Krstić's death was banned in June 2012 for violation of the minority rights and inspiring inter-ethnic and inter-religious hatred.

== Selected bibliography ==
Krstić was author of several works on theology and sociology including:

- "Шта је православни монархизам?" [What is Orthodox Monarchism], Pogledi бр. 199, 24–25, March 1999
- Pobediti ili nestati: ogledi o srbskom putu i antisrbckim bezpućima [To win or to perish]. Rivel Ko. 2002.
- Slovo i duh: pravoslavlje i nacionalna kultura. Rivel Ko. 2002. ISBN 978-86-82345-18-3.
