= Obraz (organization) =

Political organization in Serbia

Obraz Образ
- Leader: Mladen Obradović
- Founder: Nebojša M. Krstić
- Founded: 1993
- Headquarters: Belgrade
- Ideology: Clerical fascism; Neo-fascism; Serbian irredentism; Antisemitism
- Political position: Far-right
- Religion: Serbian Orthodox Church

Party flag

Website
- obraz.rs (archived)

Obraz (Serbian: Образ; fully the Fatherland Front "Obraz", Serbian: Отачаствени покрет "Образ", romanized: Otačastveni pokret "Obraz", lit. 'icon') is a far-right political organization in Serbia. The Constitutional Court of Serbia banned Obraz in 2012, although it shortly after re-registered under a similar name.

The organization is classified as clero-fascist by several organizations and government institutions, including the government of the Serbian province of Vojvodina and the Serbian Ministry of Interior. On 12 June 2012 Obraz was officially banned by the Constitutional Court of Serbia. While swearing allegiance to the Serbian nation and to the Serbian Orthodox religion, Obraz is committed to a struggle against those groups which it views as enemies of the Orthodox Serbian people, such as "Zionists (which they also include Kabbalists, Manichaeists, Freemasons and Illuminati as part of the wider Judeo-Masonic conspiracy theory), Ustashe (mainly Croatian nationalists), Muslim extremists (mainly Bosniak nationalists), Albanian terrorists (mainly Albanian nationalists), false pacifists (mainly human rights activists and NGOs in Serbia), political partisans, sectarians (religious sects), perverts (which they include pedophiles and the LGBT population), drug addicts and criminals (mainly Serbian mafia)". The movement's ideology is mainly influenced by Nikolaj Velimirović, Dimitrije Ljotić and the Yugoslav National Movement Zbor.

== Activities ==
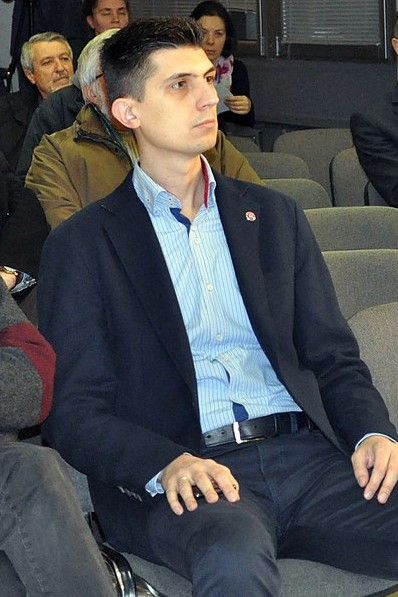
The current leader of Obraz, Mladen Obradović

In late 2001 they staged the First Assembly of the Orthodox-National Youth at the Belgrade University after 1944. Participants in the Assembly were members of society "Sveti Justin Filozof", Serbian Assembly "Dveri", and the Serbian Orthodox priests. However, most emphasized was the "Spiritual vertical of the Serb history and Serb people". The rally underlined the spiritual authority of Justin Popović and Nikolaj Velimirović and urged creation of the Serb state in line with their ideas. There were many priests and also girls dressed in Serb folk-costumes. The Assembly also called on reconciliation between followers of Draža Mihailović, and dissemination of their ideas in schools.

Obraz praised war criminal indictees Ratko Mladić and Radovan Karadžić: "We salute the last of Serb heroes! Gen. Ratko Mladić [...] and Dr. Radovan Karadžić [...] led Bosnian Serbs in their fight for survival; we thank the great men for their sacrifices with a hope that our pages will strike a spark of inspiration for future generations."

According to Professor Dr. Ljubiša Rajić, the message on the Obraz' web site: "re-hashes old ideas of svetosavlje, which attach primary importance to assembly-making, monarchy, clericalism, conservatism, and patriarchal culture. Moreover those ideas are currently openly espoused by contemporary ideologues of Serb nationalism, the far-right parties and some Serbian Orthodox priests”.

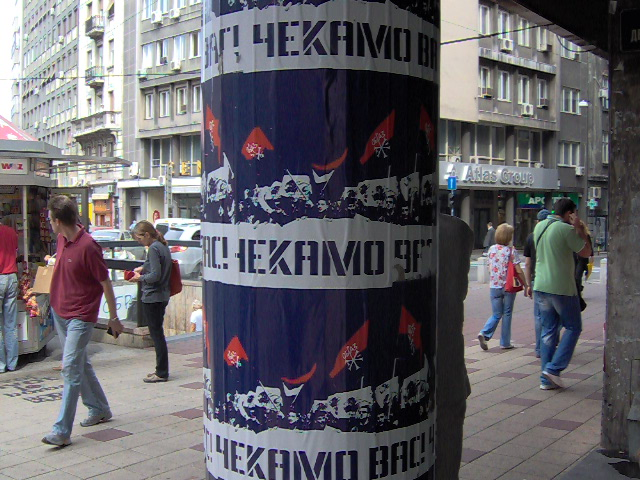
"We are waiting for you!", a message to participants of the 2009 Belgrade Gay Pride Parade that was ultimately banned by the state.

But that anti-LGBT sentiment is characteristic also of other organizations, like Fatherland Front "Obraz", which according to Nebojša M. Krstić, president of movement "verbally fights against abuses of human rights committed for the sake of legalization of sexually deviant homosexuals and lesbians and numerous sects in our country" Members of the organization chanted "Death to faggots" (Serbian: Смрт педерима, romanized: Smrt pederima).

In February 2008, Obraz symbols were displayed at a Kosovo Serb rally in the northern part of the city of Kosovska Mitrovica and during the Kosovo is Serbia rally in protest against the independence of Kosovo. And in September 2009, they issued open threats of violence through propaganda posters to the organizers and participants of the Gay Pride Parade in Belgrade.

On 11 July 2009, after the burial of 543 victims in Srebrenica, a group of men and women associated with Obraz "chanted insults directed towards the victims and in support of the Chetnik movement, calling for eradication of Islam".

== Legal status ==
On 28 February 2009, the Human and Minority Rights Ministry of Serbia sought to shut down Obraz and submitted an initiative to look into the legality of its work.

In 2011, Obraz was submitted to the constitutional court of Serbia to be forbidden as an extremist organization and to prevent its registration under a different name. The leader of this organization Mladen Obradović is accused for calls for lynch of the LGBT population in Serbia in 2009 and 2010. He was convicted for 10 months sentence for threatening LGBT people at the pride parade in 2009. He was also convicted for 2 years for the same crimes at the 2010 pride parade.

On 12 June 2012, the Constitutional Court of Serbia declared Obraz illegal.

== Literature ==
- Byford, J.T. (2002). Christian right-wing organisations and the spreading of anti-Semitic prejudice in post-Miloševic Serbia: The case of the Dignity Patriotic Movement. East European Jewish Affairs, Vol. 32(2), 42–60.
