= Christian nationalism =

Christian ideology espousing religious nationalism

Christian nationalism is an ideology that espouses a form of religious nationalism that focuses on promoting the Christian views of its followers in order to achieve prominence or dominance in political, cultural, and social life. In countries with a state church, Christian nationalists seek to preserve the status of a Christian state. Christian nationalism has been observed to overlap with antisemitism, racism and ethnonationalism.

== By country ==
=== Argentina ===
Nacionalismo was a movement described as Catholic nationalist and it was strongly influenced by Maurassisme and Spanish clericalism as well as by Italian fascism and Nazism. It espoused hatred of liberalism, leftism, Freemasonry, feminism, Jews and foreigners. The Argentine Patriotic League was a Nacionalista paramilitary group founded in 1919. It received military training from members of the Argentine Armed Forces and supported by the Church. They attacked in particular Catalans (accused of being anarchists) and Jews (accused of being Bolsheviks).

The Tacuara Nationalist Movement was a neo-Nazi urban guerilla group founded in Argentina in 1957, with its origins in Catholic Christian nationalism.

=== Brazil ===
In Brazil, Christian nationalism, a result of a Catholic-Evangelical coalition, has a goal of curbing the influence of "moral relativism, social liberalism, alleged neo-Marxism in its various forms, and LBGTQ rights".

A 2024 Pew Research Center survey found that 13% of Brazilians self-identified as "religious nationalists".

=== Canada ===
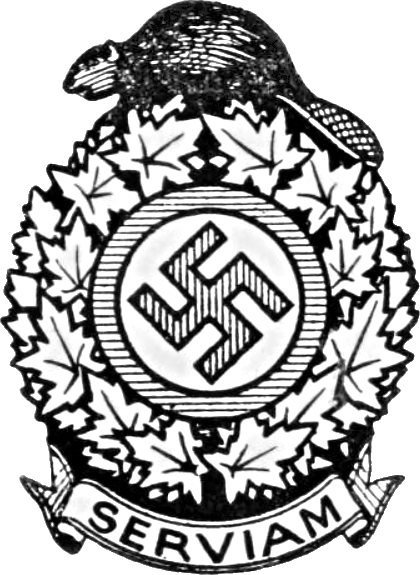
Symbol of Arcand's party: The Latin word serviam means "I will serve". The phrase refers to the traditional battle cry of Saint Michael the Archangel ("I will serve"), spoken in defiance of Satan's rebellious cry of non serviam ("I will not serve").

In the early 20th century, an antisemitic movement called the Christian Nationalist Party rose in Canada, led by the "Canadian Fuhrer" Adrian Arcand. Serviam was also the name of the newspaper founded after the suppression of the party under the War Measures Act for its pro-Nazi sentiment. Serviam defined itself as "pro-Gentile and pro-Christian" and "[Serviam] combats the error of communism which is the work of the Jews" and goes on to demand the suppression of the Talmud for supposedly slandering Christianity in its 1967 issue. Arcand also co-operated with the American Christian Nationalist Crusade, which distributed his writings from 1949 onwards and denounced "Jewish tyranny" in Canada.

The COVID-19 pandemic saw a rise in Christian nationalist activity with many groups using anti-lockdown sentiments to expand their reach to more people. The group Liberty Coalition Canada has garnered support from many elected politicians across Canada. In their founding documents, they argue that "it is only in Christianized nations that religious freedom has ever flourished". Their rallies have attracted the support of Alex Jones and Canada First, a spin-off of Nick Fuentes' group America First. Many of Liberty Coalition Canada's leaders are pastors who have racked up millions in potential fines for violating COVID protocols and in many cases express ultra-conservative views.

A 2024 Pew Research Center survey found that 3% of Canadians self-identified as "religious nationalists".

=== Croatia ===
The Atlantic describes the Ustashe as a Catholic Christian nationalist party, and claims Pope Pius XII was complicit in supporting the Croatian Christian nationalist movement despite its perpetrating a genocide of Jews, Roma, Serbs and others. The extent to which the Catholic Church was involved in Ustashe atrocities is a matter of academic debate. Rehabilitation of the Ustashe movement plays an important part in the Catholic-nationalist movement, for example a number of clergy petitioned the Croatian President to reintroduce the Za dom spremni-salute. According to the researcher Morgan Oddie:

Croat Catholic nationalism was centered upon the public campaign for the canonization of Cardinal Aloysius Stepinac, who was held in high esteem by Catholic Croat nationalists for his opposition to the Yugoslav communist regime’s attempt to control the church. His persecution made him a hero to the Croats, but he was loathed by Serbs and Serbian clergy for his suspected support of the Croatian Nazi puppet government in World War II.

Eurozine describes a coalition of the radical right and the local Catholic Church. Its goal is to reverse the outcome of the Second World War: to brand anti-fascist partisans as criminals, portray the Ustashe and the Nazis as liberators, and purge public life of all minorities: political, social, sexual, religious, and ethnic. Human rights would be sharply curtailed or subordinated to Catholic moral doctrine, including the elimination of abortion rights. Thousands of Croatian nationalists attend the annual memorial mass for the Croatian Nazi collaborators killed in Bleiburg, and Croatian parliament sponsors the event with some 500,000 kunas (71,500 dollars).

Chief Secretary of the Croatian Party of Rights (a member of European Conservatives and Reformists Group in the European Parliament) and MP Pero Ćorić stated that: "the party’s ultimate goal and dream is to make Croatia a non-secular state and to put a three meter tall cross in the Parliament". The party also opposes LGBT rights, racial and sexual minorities and seeks to rehabilitate the Ustashe. The party was described as Christian Catholic Nationalist and was in a governing coalition with the Croatian Democratic Union. Ćorić was also pictured with a portrait of Poglavnik Ante Pavelic.

=== Czech Republic ===
Cardinal Dominik Duka supported Christian traditionalist and nationalist causes and promoted “a populist approach and anti-immigrant rhetoric, islamophobia and disrespect for the Czech Prague intellectuals, political activists, NGOs, and human rights movements”.

A Dominican friar, Filip Antonín Maria Stajner, publicly recommended that Christians vote for the neo-fascist Freedom and Direct Democracy (SPD). In another case during the parliamentary elections Josef Nerušil, who worked for the Archbishop of Prague, as well as the social media representative of Cardinal Dominik Duka, declared himself as the main candidate of the SPD in a Prague electoral district. He claimed that the party represented Christian values better than the centrist Christian Democrats (KDU-ČSL). Neither Cardinal Duka nor the Prague Archbishopric issued any public disavowal or distancing from Nerušil's decision to join and run with the SPD. Nerušil became a Chamber of Deputies representative in 2026 for the SPD, which is also part of the Babiš cabinet. Nerušil and Duka were outright described as Christian nationalists by political scientist Pavla Čechová.

Among traditionalist currents in conservative Catholicism, various nationalistic initiatives linked to the Christian Right surfaced in the early 1990s, such as the Society of Charles IV and the Club of Francis Ferdinand d’Este. The Club of Francis Ferdinand d’Este specifically attracted supporters and members from the KDU-ČSL, radical groups, and exponents of neo-Nazism and antisemitism.

A broad coalition of groups formed to oppose government anti-COVID policies and related vaccination efforts. This alliance brought together participants from non-political civic associations, prominent media figures in the medical field, far-right organizations, and Christian nationalists and conservative Catholics, prominently through the groups Action D.O.S.T. and the St. Joseph Institute. They organized demonstrations against the introduction of COVID passes, condemning them as "permanent sanitationist apartheid". Christian nationalist activists associated with Michal Semín, wrote an open letter to Archbishop Jan Graubner, criticizing his support for the vaccination program. The letter was published on Te Deum, an ultra-Catholic online platform. Finally, Action D.O.S.T. played a key role in co-organizing large-scale mass protests in Prague against COVID restrictions. These events were jointly supported by smaller non-parliamentary parties and initiatives, including nationalist and neo-Nazi groups.

=== Finland ===
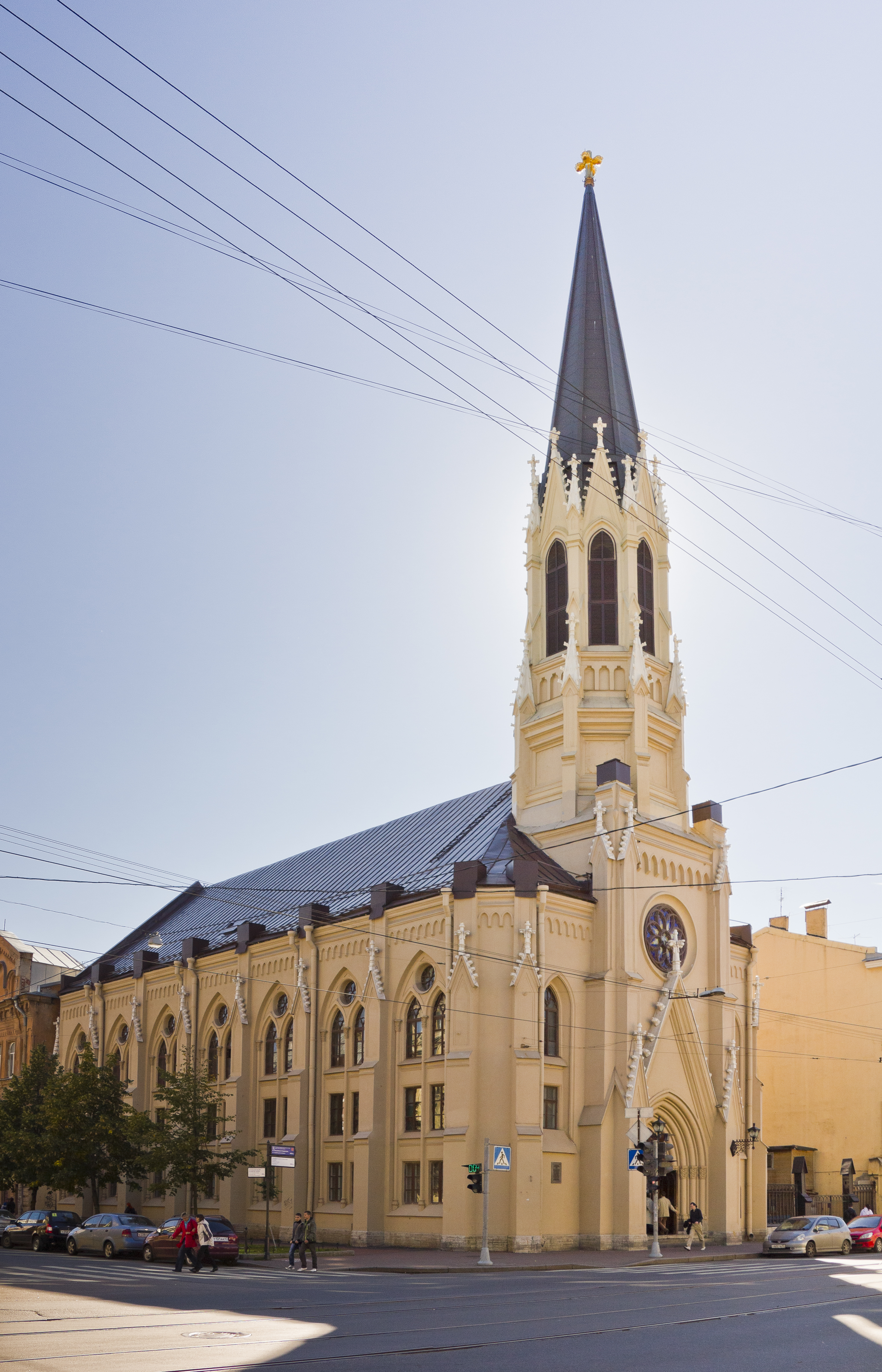
Finnish traditionalist Christians ordain priests in the conservative Ingrian Church.

The so called "Fighting Awakenism" was a militant Christian nationalist movement that incresingly embraced fascism in the 1930s, and violence was seen as a positive good in Awakenist-led extreme right movements like the Academic Karelia Society (AKS), the Lapua Movement and the Patriotic People's Movement (IKL). One of the most prominent Christian nationalists was Pastor Elias Simojoki, the leader of the fascist youth movement Blue-and-Blacks, MP of the fascist IKL and a founding member of the AKS. Simojoki wedded fanatical Christianity with Finnish irredentism and "sacred hatred" against communists and "godless ruskies", in service of which violence was justified, comparable to the Crusades.

Another IKL MP and Vicar of the Lutheran Church Kaarlo Kares welcomed Nazi Germany and openly supported the views of the German Christian movement, and according to him, with the Nazis, "new refreshing winds were blowing in the German church". IKL clergy in general felt that the church "imbued by nationalist spirit" like in Germany was the obvious right choice, as opposed to the liberal church corrupted by internationalism, like in England and the United States. Urho Muroma, the unofficial evangelist of the church and the founder of the Bible College of Finland held incendiary speeches to audiences of tens of thousands where he proposed following the example of the Nazi Germany and holding book burnings of "degenerate literature".

Former leader of the Finns Party and Speaker of Parliament Jussi Halla-Aho has called the state church Finnish Evangelical Lutheran Church a "Dhimmi-church" for being "too soft" on immigrants. Archbishop Tapio Luoma of the church has expressed his concern over the rise of Christian nationalism. Many Finnish traditionalist Lutherans are members of the Mission Diocese, as they consider the state church too secular and liberal.

The small far-right and pro-Russian Power Belongs to the People (VKK) party has been described as Christian nationalist by Helsingin Sanomat. The Freedom of Speech and Religion Association, associated with MP and former chair of the Christian Democrats Päivi Räsänen, has also supported openly fascist candidates of the Blue-and-Black Movement that seek to ban the LGBT movement and "non-native religions" (i.e. other than Christianity and paganism). The association also supports VKK and the Freedom Alliance. The Blue-and-Black Movement itself is also inspired by the Christian fascist Patriotic People's Movement and its leader Tuukka Kuru is a member of the Mission Diocese. Aforementioned local far-right pro-Russian parties have recruited combatants for the Russian side in Ukraine, who have then after gone to the Russian Imperial Movement's training camps in St. Petersburg and become fighters in the Russo-Ukrainian War.

The Finnish Bible Belt of Ostrobothnia has been significantly shaped by the conservative Finnish Lutheran revival and Awakenism. The area was also the place of origin of the Finnish fascist movements Lapua Movement and Patriotic People's Movement, and revivalism was a dominant force among Finnish fascists and Nazis. Even in the modern day, the Revivalist Lutheran Evangelical Association of Finland chooses to ordain their priests in the Russian Evangelical Lutheran Church of Ingria because of its strong opposition to the LGBT movement and women in ministry.

A Finnish Christian nationalist media ecosystem has emerged: the Neo-Nazi Nordic Resistance Movement has published the Magneettimedia newspaper that Suomen Kuvalehti characterized as Christian nationalist. The newspaper and its distribution were funded by department store tycoon and holocaust denier Juha Kärkkäinen. In 2013 the newspaper was circulated to some 660,000 households. Theological magazine Vartija also defined as Christian nationalist the alt-tech website Oikea Media, Patmos Mission Foundation and the television channels TV7 and AlfaTV. It further observes that "It has been noticeable that those on the extreme right, both religiously and politically, have found each other": there is an informal group of over 500 religious members of the far-right Finns Party.

=== Ghana ===
In Ghana, Christian nationalists seek to uphold what they see as "traditional markers of Ghanaian identity including, Christianity, social conservatism, and antagonism to 'progressive' 'Western' ideas, such as LGBTQ+ equality".

A 2024 Pew Research Center survey found that 17% of Ghanaians self-identified as "religious nationalists", which was the third highest after 21% in the Philippines and 32% in Kenya.

=== Hungary ===
The Kingdom of Hungary under the leadership of Miklós Horthy is seen by many historians as Christian nationalist in nature. Historian István Deák described the Horthy regime this way:

Between 1919 and 1944 Hungary was a rightist country. Forged out of a counter-revolutionary heritage, its governments advocated a "nationalist Christian" policy; they extolled heroism, faith, and unity; they despised the French Revolution, and they spurned the liberal and socialist ideologies of the 19th century. The governments saw Hungary as a bulwark against bolshevism and bolshevism's instruments: socialism, cosmopolitanism, and Freemasonry. They perpetrated the rule of a small clique of aristocrats, civil servants, and army officers, and surrounded with adulation the head of the state, the counterrevolutionary Admiral Horthy.

In 1944, the regency of Horthy was overthrown, and Nazi Government of National Unity led by Arrow Cross Party of Ferenc Szálasi was installed in its place. Although both Arrow Cross and established conservatives partook in "National Christian or Christian Nationalist ideology", Arrow Cross' antisemitism was much more extreme, and the Government of National Unity unleashed the Holocaust in Hungary. According to researcher and Holocaust survivor Moshe Y. Herczl:

A considerable portion of the media in Hungary described the swastika as a symbol of the forces defending European Christian culture, struggling bravely against the danger of Red expansion from the east and against the Bolshevik-Jewish Weltanschauung. It served as a source of inspiration for the various cross movements, including the Arrow-Cross party.

Hungarian Prime Minister Viktor Orbán has often advocated for Christian nationalism, both within Hungary and as a type of international movement including other European and American Christian nationalists.

A 2024 Pew Research Center survey found that 1% of Hungarians self-identified as "religious nationalists".

=== Italy ===
The Forza Nuova (New Force, FN) party "combines militant neo-fascism with traditionalist Catholic nationalism". The FN's platform includes reversing modern secular reforms and restoring the original 1929 Lateran Treaty signed by Benito Mussolini, establishing the privileged position of the Catholic church. Members of the FN have been accused of antisemitic acts and Holocaust denial. The FN is closely tied to the Polish neo-fascist Catholic National Radical Camp (ONR) and attends their independence day demonstration. Foreign Policy described the FN as "immigrant-hating Catholic fundamentalists" and "Italy's most dangerous populists". The FN also provided support and a lawyer for Luca Traini who went on a shooting spree, injuring 6 refugees. The FN was condemned by Italian Jewish organizations in 2022 when the coffin of an FN militant was draped with a swastika flag during the funeral procession in Rome.

The FN and its leader, former MEP Roberto Fiore were present at the 2026 Écône consecrations and declared they have always followed the line of the Society of Saint Pius X (SSPX) and "Lefebvrism". The FN is also connected to the Traditionalist Catholic Sedevacantist organization Christus Rex, through a member who is a candidate and the sedeprivationist congregation Istituto Mater Boni Consilii.

Hauptsturmführer Erich Priebke who perpetrated the Ardeatine massacre died in 2013. His funeral was performed by the SSPX in the church of their priory in Albano Laziale and was attended by many neo-fascists. Traditionalist Catholic priest Florian Abrahamowicz, celebrated a Mass in suffrage of Priebke in a chapel in Paese; the mayor of Resana, Loris Mazzorato (Lega Nord), was among those attending the Mass. Abrahamowicz is close to the far-right regionalist Lega Nord party and the founder of the party Umberto Bossi attended his masses. Lega Nord's all-Italian successor party Lega is part of the governing Meloni government. Abrahamowicz previously caused controversy for saying he doubted if gas chambers were used to kill people during the Holocaust.

Some Italians affiliated with the FN have joined the Russian separatist units in the Russo-Ukrainian war, which include sympathetic far-right and Christian nationalist groups. In 2019 the Italian police found a cache of firearms including assault rifles, machine guns and a Super 530 missile during raids on pro-Russian militants and FN officials.

=== The Netherlands ===
In the 19th-century Netherlands, the phrase christelijk-nationaal ("Christian-National") was used by the anti-revolutionary movement. Its forerunners in the Réveil included the poets Willem Bilderdijk and Isaäc da Costa, the latter of whom called the Netherlands "the Israel of the West". The movement's leader, Guillaume Groen van Prinsterer, interpreted modern history as a struggle between the Gospel and the "spirit of revolution" released in 1789, and described his movement as Christian-National. Its main practical demand concerned schooling. In 1860 Groen founded the Association for Christian-National Primary Education, and he campaigned for schools organised along denominational lines and under parental control, a right he was prepared to extend to non-Christian parents as well.

Abraham Kuyper organised the movement into the Anti-Revolutionary Party in 1879, the first modern political party in the Netherlands, and became prime minister in 1901. His doctrine of sphere sovereignty underpinned pillarisation, the system in which Protestants, Catholics and secular groups each ran their own schools, newspapers, unions and parties. Participation in the pillars was voluntary, and Kuyper was suspicious of state power. He also rejected the idea of a national church bound to a single people. Through ministers and scholars trained in the Netherlands, the Christian-National idea passed to South Africa, where it took on a more ethnic meaning.

=== Mexico ===
The foremost Mexican private university Universidad Autónoma de Guadalajara (UAG) was founded by anti-Marxist Jalisco Student Federation (FEJ). FEJ leaders Antonio Leaño Álvarez del Castillo and his brothel Ángel were among the UAG’s founders and del Castillo was a prominent member in the UAG-based Los TECOS, a Catholic nationalist neo-Nazi secret society recruited from the Catholic students and staff of the university. Carlos Cuesta Gallardo, the founder of Los TECOS and president of the FEJ, was also one of the founders of the UAG. He spent World War II in Nazi Germany, embraced its ideology, and was allegedly appointed by Nazi leadership to organize a pro-Nazi fifth column in Mexico. After the war he established the paramilitary TECOS, which collaborated with Nazi fugitives and neo-Nazi groups around the world. The United States gave millions of dollars of financial assistance to the UAG through the United States Agency for International Development (USAID) which was laundered through UAG by Los TECOS to support their political activities which included forging connections to neo-Nazi groups in Europe and South America, publication of anti-Semitic propaganda, including a magazine called Réplica, and coordinating with regional death squads.

Los TECOS as an extremely reactionary group was opposed to the Second Vatican Council and was an early group advocating and providing ideological and theological basis for Sedevacantism. Fr. Joaquín Sáenz y Arriaga served as the spiritual advisor of the group, and was staunchly anti-communist, supporting a so-called "Christian order" against an alleged "Judeo-Masonic conspiracy." In 1971, Sáenz y Arriaga published a work entitled La nueva iglesia montiniana ("The New Montinian Church"), in which he argued that Pope Paul VI (Giovanni Montini) was an illegitimate Pope and crypto-Jew who had the goal of creating a new Kabbalistic “homocentric religion of universal brotherhood” in place of the Catholic Church. In the 1990 the Mexican sedevacantist movement founded by Sáenz y Arriaga began to fracture with many new groups emerging, including Sociedad Sacerdotal Trento ("Tridentine Priesty Society"), Fundación San Vicente Ferrer and the Obra Mariana Carmelitana. Many of these groups developed good relations with Bishop Mark Pivarunas and the Congregation of Mary Immaculate Queen (CMRI) in the United States, which had developed in the mid-1980s as the CMRI had cut ties with Francis Schuckardt. Pivarunas had been consecrated in 1991 by Bishop Moisés Carmona, who in turn consecrated Martín Dávila Gándara of the Sociedad Sacerdotal Trento in 1999.

=== Poland ===
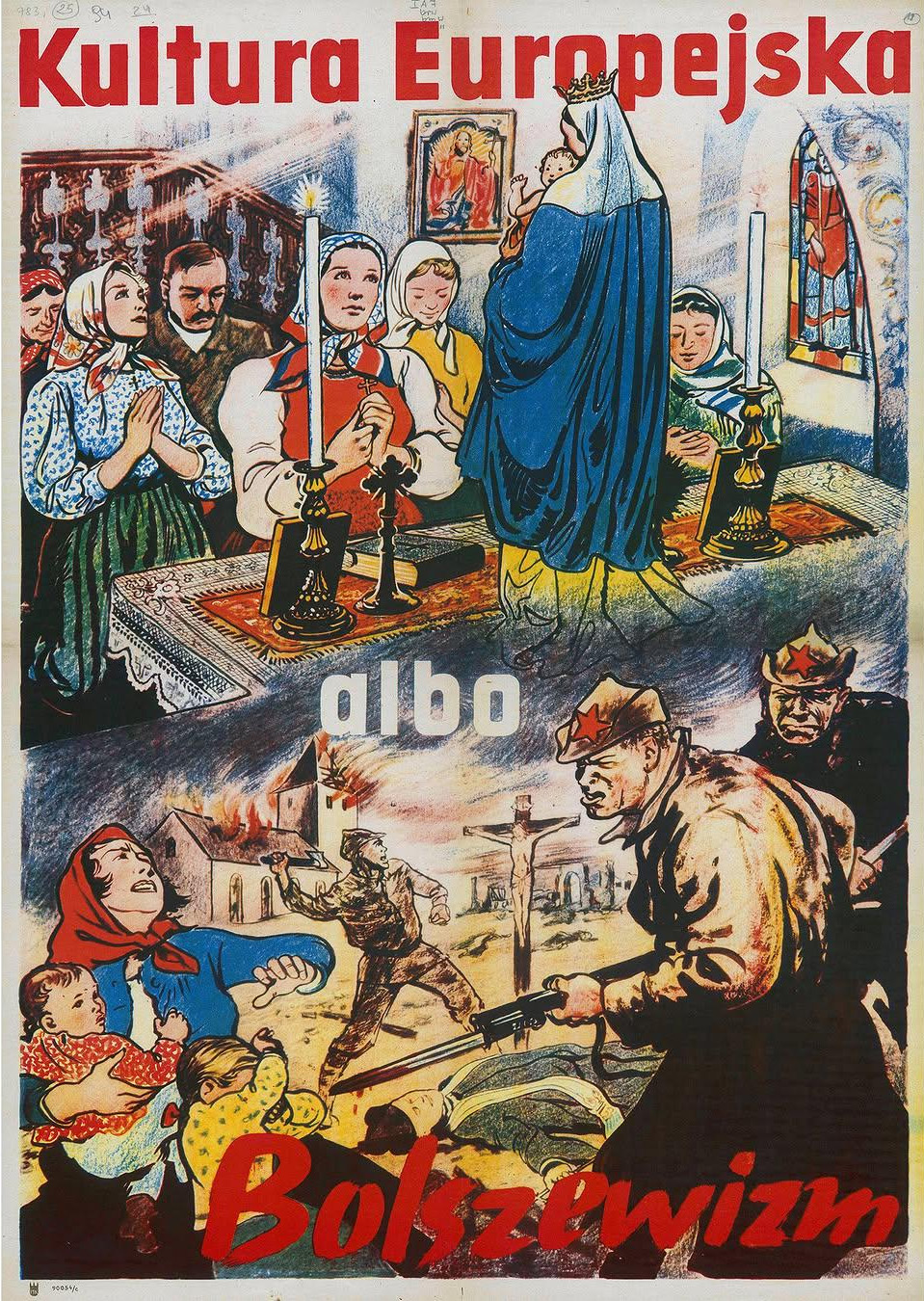
Nazi poster contrasting Christian European culture with Bolshevism

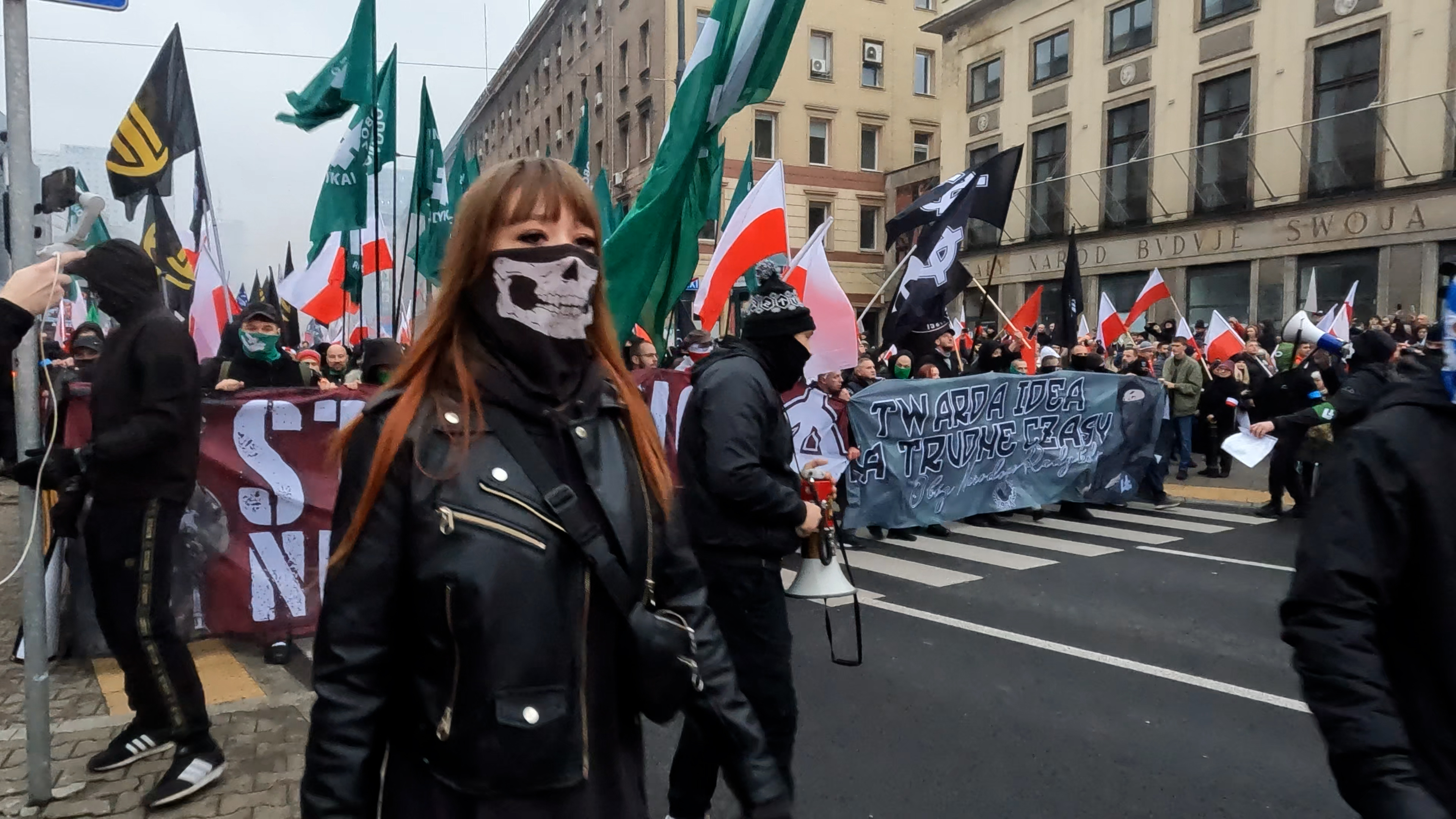
National Radical Camp demonstration

In the 1930s and 1940s, there existed some admiration for fascist movements in Poland. Prominent Polish nationalist Reverend Stanisław Trzeciak wrote in the Christian nationalist magazine Mały Dziennik that "Hitler's program is based on papal encyclicals... [Hitler plays] a providential role in curbing Jewish malice and saving humanity from Judeo-Bolshevism."

Robert Bakiewicz, who organizes the annual far-right nationalist Independence March attended by tens of thousands, is a member of a Traditionalist Catholic Society of Saint Pius X church. Bakiewicz is the former leader of National Radical Camp that has been described as neo-Nazi, neo-fascist and adherent of Catholic nationalism. The Law and Justice (PiS) government sponsored Bakiewicz by over 1 million euros. In 2017, Bakiewicz held a speech during the Independence March, kissing a crucifix and calling for a crusade against "cultural marxists" and for a Catholic theocracy. The attendees of the Independence March used slogans such as "We want God" and "White Poland".

The Christian nationalist All-Polish Youth has also been linked to neo-Nazis and caused controversy when its members were saluting swastika flags and chanting "sieg heil". All-Polish Youth is the unofficial youth group of the neo-fascist National Movement and one of the main participants of the Independence Day march. All-Polish Youth's self-declared aim is to "to raise Polish youth in a Catholic and patriotic spirit" and it operates under the slogan "Great Catholic Poland". The National Movement, then led by Robert Winnicki, described as an "ideological soulmate" of Bakiewicz, sponsored the November 2017 anti-Israel demonstration that was attended by 60,000 people. The Algemeiner characterized the demonstration as "Ultranationalist and neo-Nazi".

Christian nationalist groups like the League of Polish Families have dismissed pogroms committed by Poles such as Jedwabne massacre, while simultaneously arguing Jews were collectively guilty of treason in supporting the Soviet Union.

Former Polish ruling party PiS has been described as Christian nationalist. Under PiS, there was a near total ban on abortion, and many areas in the country were declared "LGBT-free zones". PiS allegedly facilitated co-operation between conservative institutions and far-right extremists. In 2023, the PiS affiliated fundamentalist Catholic group Ordo Iuris started a campaign for the release of a neo-Nazi activist Marika Matuszak convicted of attacking an LGBT event, and she was released by PiS Justice Minister Zbigniew Ziobro. Sejm member and chair of the Together Party Adrian Zandberg criticized PiS Prime Minister Mateusz Morawiecki for "commemorat[ing] a unit that openly collaborated with the Gestapo" for paying tribute to the Holy Cross Mountains Brigade and said Hubert Jura may be a hero to Morawiecki, but not to him.

=== Romania ===
The leader of the National-Christian Defense League Nichifor Crainic was described as a "veteran Christian-nationalist and anti-Semitic combatant" by the International Commission on Holocaust in Romania. Ion Antonescu's order to confiscate Jewish property was justified as "a way to honor the old traditions of Romanian Christian nationalism and culturally unite the country with the new European celebration of national freedoms." Professor of theology and cleric Ioan Gheorghe Savin hailed the formation of Romania into an antisemitic fascist National Legionary State as a "full victory of Christian Nationalism". A. C. Cuza and Octavian Goga, the leaders of the National Christian Party that adhered to Nazism and fascism used the label to describe their movement. Cuza stated that Nazism "will restore Aryan and Christian culture against the international Jewish domination." Christian Nationalist and fascist Iron Guard (officially the "Legion of the Archangel Michael") was responsible for the Bucharest Pogrom and Iași pogrom in which over 13,000 Jews were killed. According to a police report from 1937, 1.2% of legionnaires were ordained priests, numbering several thousands. Legionary death-squads included a significant number of Orthodox seminary students.

=== Russia ===
Flags of the Russian National Unity

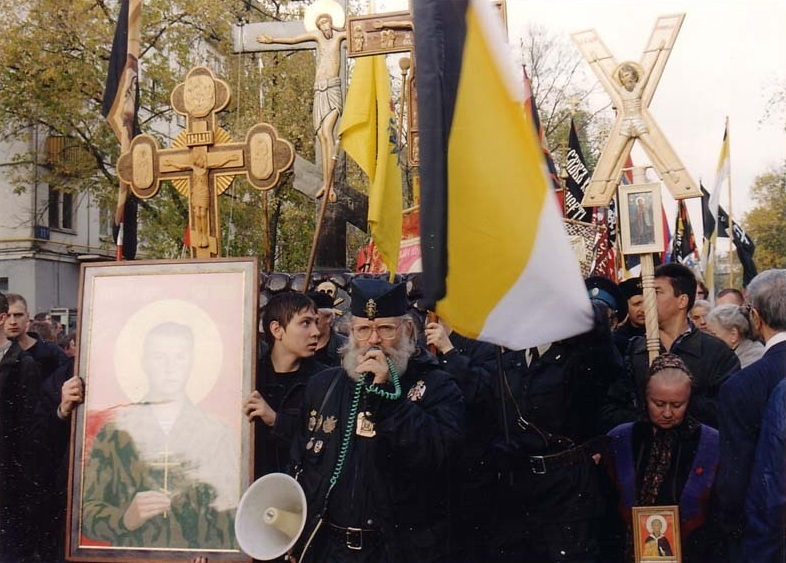
Procession with the cross at the White House in Moscow, Russia. The picture is that of Yevgeny Rodionov, bearing a halo.

President of Russia Vladimir Putin has been described as a global leader of the Christian nationalist and Christian right movements. As President, Putin has increased the power of the Russian Orthodox Church and proclaimed his staunch belief in Eastern Orthodoxy, as well as maintaining close contacts with Patriarchs of Moscow and all Rus' Alexy II and Kirill.

The National Patriotic Front Memory was a pioneer in wedding fanatical Orthodoxy, ethnic nationalism, xenophobia and antisemitism in the late 20th century Russia, having been founded in 1980 during the days of the Soviet Union when there was a dearth of such groups due to state repression. Alexander Kulakov, the leader of the Orthodox Front, one of the member organizations of "Memory", said that

The destruction of evil forces on earth, i.e., of Zionism will start with the revival of the Orthodox spirit among the grass roots…. The destruction of the Orthodox faith, of the Aryan genotype, and the ruin of Russia is the basic credo of Zionism…. It means that anti-Judaism and faith in God are inseparable.

In the 1990s, Ilya Lazarenko led the Front of National Revolutionary Action that according to their self-stated purpose supported "Orthodox national idea", primacy of Orthodoxy and "Great National-Socialist Russian Empire".

Arguably the most striking racist community in virtual Russia is that of the Russian Orthodox Church, which has attracted numerous individuals whose spirituality is intertwined with ethnic pride and a deep resentment of Western civilization, viewed as a vehicle of Jewish influence. Even this is insufficient for the most radical Orthodox Russian nationalists, who are members of the ROCOR or True Orthodox Church or Old Believers, due to viewing Moscow Patriarchate as subverted due to its ecumenism, ties with the KGB and due to the church recently opening dialogue with Jewish communities.

The Russian Imperial Movement is a prominent neo-Nazi Christian nationalist group that trains militants all over Europe and has recruited thousands of fighters for its paramilitary group, the Imperial Legion, which is participating in the invasion of Ukraine. The group also works with the Atomwaffen Division in order to network with and recruit extremists from the United States.

Alexander Barkashov was a parishioner of the Russian True Orthodox Church (RTOC), and the first cells of the neo-Nazi Russian National Unity (RNU) were formed as brotherhoods and communities of the RTOC. RNU is closely linked to the Russian Orthodox Army responsible for sectarian violence and antisemitic attacks in Donbass. The extreme nationalist Russian Catacomb Church of True Orthodox Christians has canonized Russian nationalists Konstantin Voskoboinik and Bronislav Kaminski as martyrs for their anti-communist stance which caused controversy due to their collaboration with the Nazis.

In September 2025 in St. Petersburg, multiple international far-right groups founded the International Sovereigntist League (ISL) Paladins. The groups were described as "white" and "Christian nationalist" and included Forza Nuova and Serbian Action. Its self-stated mission is to defend “white Christian values” and according to them “White Christians cannot coexist with non-whites.” The organization is named after the SS-Obersturmbannführer Otto Skorzeny's group of the same name. The event was preceded and followed by a procession led by Patriarch Kirill.

There is a culture of "political canonization" in Russia where Orthodox nationalists revere "warrior-martyrs" who fell fighting for Russia, most notably Yevgeny Rodionov. For example, it was alleged in the state-sponsored Russian Orthodox conference "Religion and Peace" that a picture of Vadim Kazak had miraculous qualities, such as weeping myrrh. Kazak was a soldier in the neo-Nazi Espaniola brigade who fell in the Russo-Ukrainian war.

=== Serbia ===
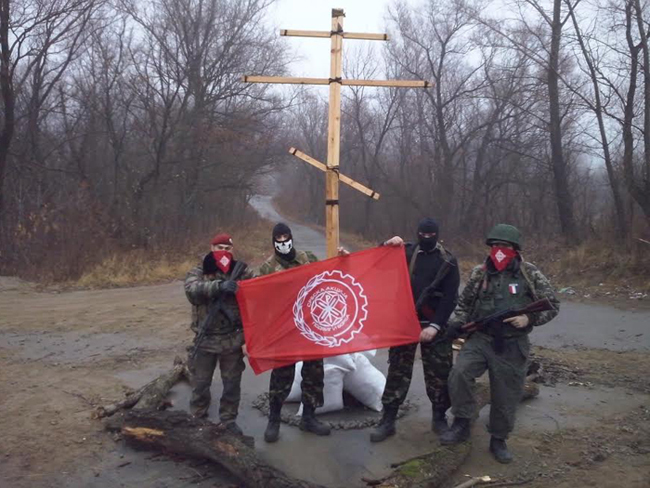
Serbian Action militants in Donbas.

Serbian Action is a prominent neo-Nazi Christian nationalist group in Serbia. The group adheres to the ideology of the fascist ZBOR and the Serbian Nazi collaborators Milan Nedic and Dimitrije Ljotić and Bishop Nikolaj Velimirović, an early supporter of Adolf Hitler. They also organize annual memorial events and marches for them. Serbian Action is also proponent of the ideology of accelerationism and supports overthrowing the government in favor of Orthodox monarchy. Serbian Action is also affiliated with the neo-Nazi monarchist Russian Imperial Movement, Golden Dawn and the Iron March network that has been described as "terroristic".

=== Slovakia ===
President and priest Jozef Tiso and his First Slovak Republic have been described as Christian nationalist. Tiso's regime was run by the Hlinka's Slovak People's Party, named after the priest and Slovak nationalist Andrej Hlinka, and it adopted Nazism and became a client state of Nazi Germany. According to professor and political scholar Hana Kubátová Slovak Christian nationalism inspired popular complicity in the Holocaust and collaboration with the Nazis. Clergy also enforced the racial stratification locally and the Roma and Jews were excluded and eventually exterminated as an obstacle to Slovakia as a pure Christian and Aryan nation.

President Tiso, preaching at a holiday mass, on August 15, at Holic, declared that it was a Christian deed to expel the Jews, since it was to the benefit of the Slovak nation to free itself of “its pests”. On this occasion he also cited Hlinka’s dictum that “a Jew remains a Jew even if he is baptized by a hundred bishops”.

In modern Slovakia, the neo-Nazi People's Party Our Slovakia and Ultranationalist Slovak National Party utilize Christian nationalism to legitimize ethnonationalist, neo-fascist, anti-immigration and antisemitic ideologies and glorify the Hlinka party regime as the ideal model of a "Christian national state".

=== Slovenia ===
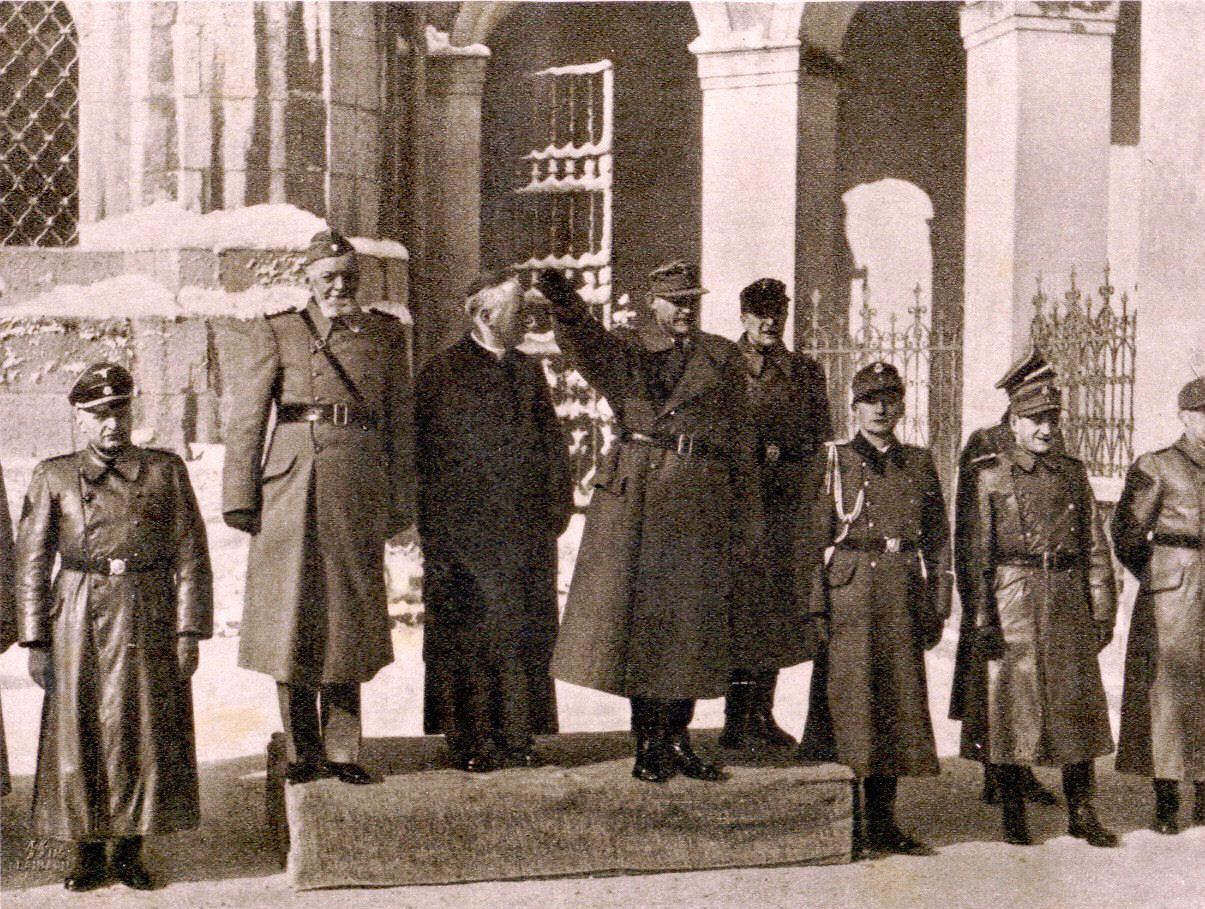
General Leon Rupnik, SS-General Erwin Rösener and Bishop Gregorij Rožman inspect Slovene Home Guard. Bishop Rožman called for all Christian Slovene patriots to fight "atheistic communism" and join the collaborator formations.

During the Second World War, the Catholic nationalist fascist terrorist group Black Hand assassinated hundreds of suspected communists and anti-fascists, allegedly with the support of the Gestapo and the Catholic Church.

According to Dnevnik, "The Guard Party" adheres to and propagates Catholic nationalism and presents itself as the "Catholic National Party" and uses "God. Family. Homeland." as its slogan. The Guard Party also caused controversy by using the slogan "My honor is called loyalty. Long live Christ the King of Slovenes!" The Scutum Fidei media is associated with the party's founder Alen Koman, who has been interviewed describing himself as the shield of Christianity, posing with firearms.

The Guard Party held a counterdemonstration to Ljubljana Pride with banners and flags, calling for "exorcism of the demons". The Guard Party promoted the event with pictures of the Nazi collaborator Leon Rupnik and his Slovene Home Guard with the text "They came, they saw, they conquered", echoing how they would "purge" Ljubljana. Activist and social worker Linn Julian Koletnik stated that the level of support for rehabilitation of Nazis is concerning. However, according to Sociologist and historian Grega Hrib the right-wing ruling Slovenian Democratic Party (SDS) is more dangerous because it is "respectable" and can often more effectively and tactfully act against those going against Church dogma. Chief editor of Catholic newspaper Družina railed against homosexual marriage and adoption, and SDS campaigned against the same issues. For example, an SDS MP and former Jesuit described homosexuality as ‘a psychological disease which should be treated”, comparing it to zoophilia and pedophilia in the National Assembly. Further, SDS has facilitated connections with the extreme right, Blood & Honour members serving as candidates in multiple localities. Investigative journalist Anuška Delić claimed she was targeted by the SDS government for documenting these ties.

Archbishop Franc Perko offered a defense of the Slovene Nazi collaborators who were killed in the Kočevski Rog massacre, framing them as Christian martyrs:

There are many true martyrs in the Kočevje caves, who resisted the violent communist revolution to defend their faith, their lives and Christian values of the Slovene nation.

=== South Africa ===
There can be no doubt of the lawfulness of conserving and defending one’s own race, even in war, and the point of laying down one’s life, if circumstances demand this.

— Fr. Bonaventure Hinwood in Race, The Reflections of a Theologian

In South Africa, Christian-National became a stock phrase of Afrikaner nationalism. The term and the idea behind it came from Groen van Prinsterer's movement in the Netherlands. At first it referred mainly to education. After the Second Boer War, when Lord Milner's administration set out to anglicise the schools of the former Boer republics, Afrikaner teachers and churchmen founded Christian-National private schools. These taught in Dutch, placed education under the responsibility of parents and stressed a Protestant Christian spirit. The small Reformed Church was among their strongest supporters. The founding programmes of the National Party, under J. B. M. Hertzog in 1914 and under D. F. Malan in 1934, both described the party as Christian-National in character. The historian Hermann Giliomee notes, however, that as a political creed the phrase remained vague and functioned "more as a shibboleth than as a comprehensive ideology".

In the 1930s, the Afrikaner Broederbond and Kuyperian academics at Potchefstroom gave the idea fuller content. The sociologist T. Dunbar Moodie describes the Christian-Nationalism they promoted as a Kuyperian interpretation of the Afrikaner civil religion, in which the term shifted from meaning Christian education to a theory of the nation's divine calling. J. C. van Rooy, chairman of the Broederbond, wrote that a "Divine Idea" was embodied in every people. The philosopher Hendrik Stoker went beyond Kuyper by treating the volk (nation) as a sphere of life with its own God-given calling. A more radical strand, influenced by German romantic nationalism and promoted by intellectuals such as Nico Diederichs, went further still and treated service to the nation as service to God. Stoker and the political scientist L. J. du Plessis criticised this as making an idol of the nation.

Afrikaner nationalism also had a radical-right fringe that admired Nazi Germany. In 1933 Louis Weichardt founded the South African Christian National Socialist Movement, popularly known as the Greyshirts. During the Second World War the Ossewabrandwag, which claimed a mass membership, campaigned for an Afrikaner republic on "national-socialist foundations". Several leading nationalist intellectuals, including L. J. du Plessis, Stoker and Piet Meyer, published work that Giliomee describes as close to Nazi ideology, and the future prime minister John Vorster was among the Afrikaner nationalists interned during the second world war. From 1942, however, Malan and other National Party leaders rejected National Socialism as an alien import, and the Dutch Reformed Church's journal Die Kerkbode rejected totalitarian state control of the church. Historians disagree over how closely the mainstream nationalist movement was tied to these groups. The historian Patrick Furlong has described the National Party and the radical right as an interconnected web with fascist features, a view Giliomee rejects as unconvincing.

After the National Party came to power in 1948, Christian-National principles were built into apartheid policy. In 1948 the Federation of Afrikaans Cultural Associations (FAK) set up an Institute for Christian-National Education. Its policy called for schools founded on Scripture, teaching in mother tongue and promoting a "national principle", and declared that black South Africans should be educated according to the same principles. A National Party commission had already recommended in 1947 a Christian-National education for black pupils according to their "ethnic nature". The theologian John de Gruchy notes that, unlike its Dutch original, Christian-National education in South Africa became part of the policy of apartheid. Moodie argues that the premises of "positive" apartheid, or separate development, were Christian-National. Black South Africans were to develop as separate "nations" in the way Afrikaners believed they themselves had become a people. By advancing ideas of Christian nationalism, the National Party could fit other "nations" into its programme of racial hierarchy and segregation. The Dutch Reformed Church provided much of the theological and moral justification for apartheid, although the Afrikaans Reformed churches later rejected it.

Historians disagree over how much weight to give religious ideas in all this. Giliomee argues that neo-Calvinism never won majority support among Afrikaner nationalists, and he explains their commitment to apartheid mainly by their preoccupation with survival as a people. Irving Hexham, by contrast, sees the Christian-National ideas of the Reformed Church as a main source of nationalist ideology.

A 2024 Pew Research Center survey found that 16% of South Africans self-identified as "religious nationalists".

=== Ukraine ===
According to Bellingcat, Orthodox Church of Ukraine (OCU) and far-right Ukrainian nationalists align on some issues, including their opposition to LGBT rights. From 2015 to 2018 Kyiv Pride has been physically attacked and intimidated by a coalition of religious and political extremist groups. Yaroslav Kulyk, a priest in the OCU, has prominently called for "patriots" to "crush" Kyiv Pride. His call has been answered by far-right extremist anti-LGBTQ online umbrella group "Tradition and Order" (Традиція і Порядок) and Karpatska Sich. Tradition and Order uses the slogan "Nation, Faith, Family", and is formed of Christian nationalist and neo-Nazi groups, such as C14 and Brotherhood. Dmytro Korchynsky, the leader of the Christian nationalist Brotherhood described his group as "Orthodox Taleban". In demonstrating against Kyiv Pride, Tradition and Order is joined by other far-right Christian anti-LGBT groups such as Katechon, National Resistance, Unknown Patriot, Sisterhood of Saint Olga, and the Interconfessional Chaplain Church. Order (Орден), the so-called "conservative wing" of the "nationalist hate group" National Corps had its banners consecrated by OCU priests. Leaders of these far-right groups have posed and marched with OCU head Epiphanius of Kyiv who in 2019 characterized LGBT ideas are "Western propaganda" and "sin".

The neo-Nazi C14 also allegedly helped to physically take over the Moscow-aligned churches for the Ukrainian Autocephaly and C14 leader Yevhen Karas posed with Patriarch Filaret.

=== United Kingdom ===
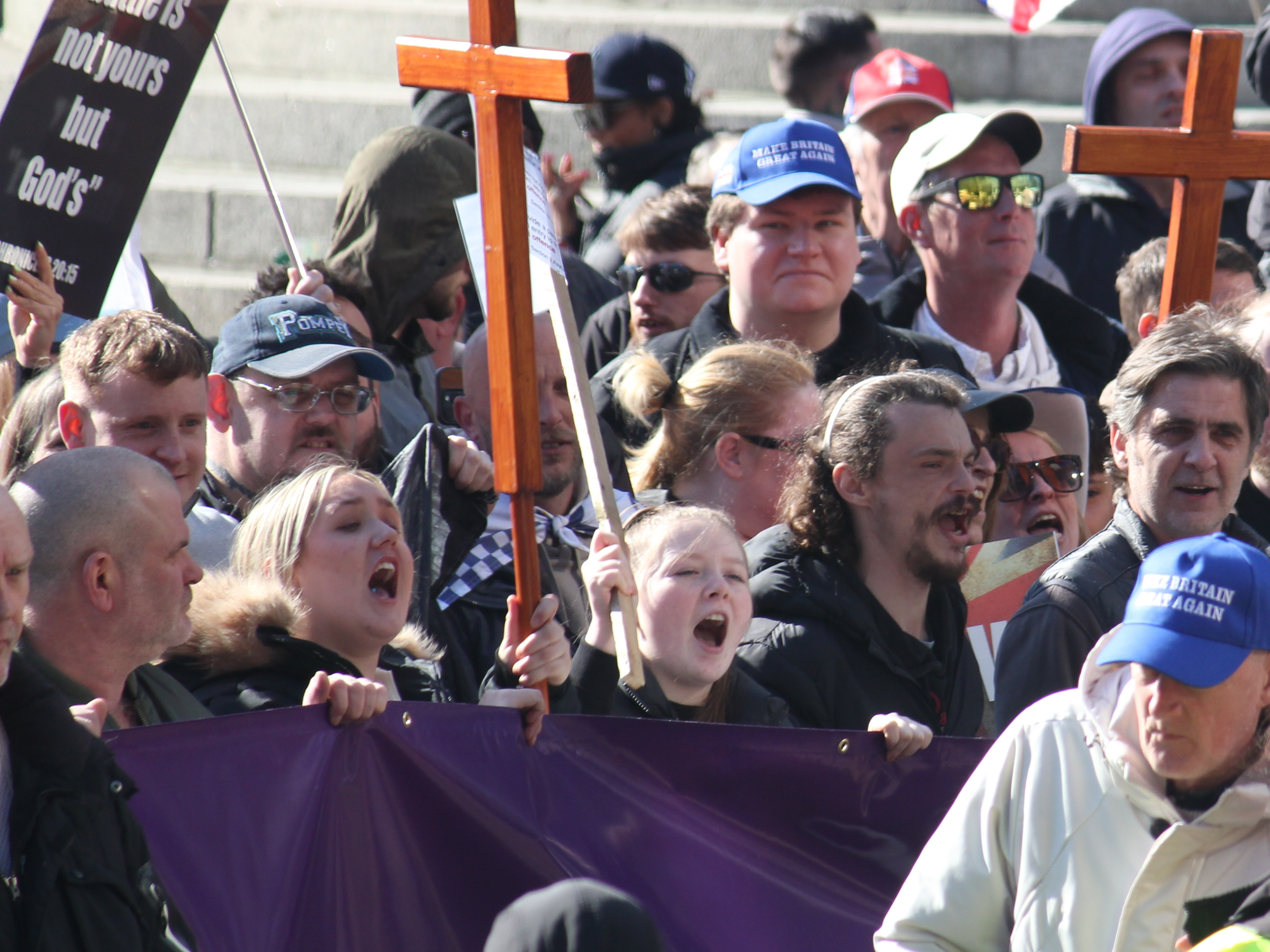
Christian and British nationalist protest in Portsmouth, England.

Former Naval officer Peter Huxley-Blythe was an influential figure on the British far-right: He mentored Colin Jordan and was the editor of the Natinform (Nationalist Information Bureau) and European Liberation Front's Frontfighter. He was also associated with the heads of the British-based House of Romanov and House of Tolstoy. Huxley-Blythe's writings promoted the supremacy of the Nordic race (ie. White, Christian and Northern European) and he equated the West with the white race and Christianity. He saw non-European immigration and the US Civil Rights movement as a plot to wipe out the white Christians by race-mixing.

According to BBC News, in 2006 the fascist British National Party (BNP) had "recently stepped up its efforts to present itself as a staunch defender of Christianity", using a Bible quote from Jesus in its European Union election campaign. The same year, the BNP founded the Christian Council of Britain, led by the Reverend Robert West. The founder of the BNP, John Tyndall's "linkage of Christian ideas to notions of race remained present throughout his BNP leadership years" and Tyndall's Spearhead magazine stated that "the white race thought of itself as Christendom", and "many of us still think that today". Tyndall's successor Nick Griffin also started streaming a "Christmas message" from Iona, chosen for its importance in Celtic Christianity, in which he railed against erosion of the Christian tradition. When a list of some BNP members was leaked in November 2008, it included multiple vicars. In BNP's Identity magazine, John Maddox wrote that atheism and Islam will end the Christian civilization of Britain. He added that "the struggle is political and social as well as spiritual and theological" and that Christians should resist by voting for BNP.

The SSPX Resistance, which split from the SSPX for being too moderate, is linked to the BNP and other British far-right nationalist groups. The Resistance has congregations in Southport, Kent, Berkshire and London among other locations. The founder of the Resistance, Bishop Richard Williamson was based in Kent and ministered to his congregation until his death in 2025. Williamson was a convicted Holocaust denier, and the Resistance is theologically and politically antisemitic.

In August 2026, Restore Britain member and speaker at Tommy Robinson's rallies Brett Murphy called Judaism "false Antichrist religion", called out Jewish "occult practices" and made homophobic and Islamophobic remarks. Murphy has been described as part of the Christian nationalist network in the United Kingdom.

=== United States ===
Christian nationalism asserts that the United States is a country founded by and for Christians. Christian nationalists in the United States advocate "a fusion of identitarian Christian identity and cultural conservatism with American civic belonging". It has been noted to bear overlap with Christian fundamentalism, white supremacy, Christian supremacy, the Seven Mountain Mandate movement, and dominionism. Most researchers have described Christian nationalism as "authoritarian" and "boundary-enforcing", but recent research has focused on how libertarian, small-government ideology and neoliberal political economics have become part of the American Christian political identity. Some Christian nationalists have openly advocated for neo-fascism, like Pastor Dale Partridge, who described Nazism as "a powerful form of Christian nationalism", and Corey Mahler, whose podcast was touted by Gab CEO Andrew Torba as the "#1 Christian Nationalist podcast in the world”, who praised Adolf Hitler and said that he was in Paradise. Torba's ChristianNationalist.com was promoted by Christian nationalist pastors like Joel Webbon and Brian Sauvé and their ministries. Pastor Joel Webbon organized the "Christ is King" event in Texas in November 2026, described as Christian nationalist and fascist. The event was attended by 1,300 people and speakers included Christian nationalists like Fr. Calvin Robinson and Nick Fuentes. Robinson called for the deportation of Jewish people from the United States.

Christian nationalism also overlaps with but is distinct from theonomy, with it being more populist in character. Theocratic Christians seek to have the Bible inform national laws and have religious leaders in positions of government; while in America, Christian nationalists view the country's founding documents as "divinely inspired" and supernaturally revealed to Christian men to preference Christianity, and are willing to elect impious heads of state if they support right-wing causes.

Christian nationalism supports the presence of Christian symbols in the public square, and state patronage for the practice and display of religion, such as Christmas as a national holiday, school prayer, singing "God Bless America", the exhibition of nativity scenes during Christmastide, and the Christian cross on Good Friday. During the Cold War, church attendance reached a highpoint in the 1950s, which was also when the United States added phrases like 'Under God' in the Pledge of Allegiance and on currency, described at the time as a "civil religion" that was motivated in part to show distance from communism. Christian nationalism also influenced the constitution of the Confederacy, which mentioned God overtly in contrast with the US Constitution.

A map showing the sum of Christian nationalist "adherents" and "sympathizers" in each US state according to the Public Religion Research Institute 2025 American Values Atlas

Christian nationalism has been linked to prejudice towards minority groups. Academics Li Ruiqian and Paul Froese have defined it as a belief that "celebrate[s] and privilege[s] the sacred history, liberty, and rightful rule of white conservatives". Christian nationalism prioritizes an ethno-cultural, ethno-religious, and ethno-nationalist framing around fear of "the other", those being immigrants, racial, and sexual minorities. Studies have associated Christian nationalism with xenophobia, homophobia, misogyny, political tolerance of racists, opposition to interracial unions, support for gun rights, pronatalism, and restricting the civil rights of those who fail to conform to traditional ideals of whiteness, citizenship, and Protestantism. The Christian nationalist belief system includes elements of patriarchy, white supremacy, nativism, and heteronormativity. It has been associated with a "conquest narrative", premillennial apocalypticism, and of frequent "rhetoric of blood, specifically, of blood sacrifice to an angry God".

American Christian nationalism is based on a worldview that America is superior to other countries, and that such superiority is divinely established. It posits that only Christians are "true Americans". Christian nationalism also bears overlap with the American militia movement. The 1992 Ruby Ridge standoff and the 1993 Waco siege served as a catalyst for the growth of militia activity among Christian nationalists. Christian nationalists believe that the US is meant to be a Christian nation, and that it was founded as a Christian nation, and want to "take back" the US for God.

Christian nationalists feel that their values and religion are threatened and marginalized, and fear their freedom to preach their moral values will be no longer dominant at best or outlawed at worst. Experimental research found that support of Christian nationalism increased when Christian Americans were told of their demographic decline. Studies have shown Christian nationalists to exhibit higher levels of anger, depression, anxiety, and emotional distress. It has been theorized that Christian nationalists fear that they are "not living up to" God's expectations, and "fear the wrath and punishment" of not creating the country desired by God.

== See also ==
- Antidisestablishmentarian – Political movement in the UK
- Antisemitism in Christianity
- Christian democracy – Christian socioeconomic model
- Christian fascism – Type of fascist philosophy
- Christian fundamentalism – Religious movement emphasizing biblical literalism
- Christian Identity – White supremacist interpretation of Christianity
- Christian reconstructionism – Fundamentalist Calvinist theonomic movement
- Christian right – Socially conservative Christian political ideology
- Christian supremacy – Belief in superiority of Christianity
- Christian terrorism – Terrorist acts by groups or individuals who profess Christian motivations or goals
- Christian theology – Study of Christian belief and practice
- Christianity and violence
- Dominion theology – Ideology seeking Christian rule
- The Handmaid's Tale – 1985 novel by Margaret Atwood
- Hindutva – Indian Hindu nationalist political ideology
- Integralism – Principle that the Catholic faith should be the basis of public law and policy
- Islam and nationalism – Overview of Islamic views on nationalistic practices
- Kahanism – Ideology based on Meir Kahane
- QAnon – American conspiracy theory and political movement
- Theocracy – Form of government with religious leaders
- Theonomy – Christian form of government ruled by divine law
