= Serbian Action =

Serbian Action Србска Акција Srbska Akcija
- Founded: 2010
- Ideology: Serbian ultranationalism; Neo-fascism; Clerical fascism; Right-wing populism; Monarchism; Hard Euroscepticism; Russophilia; Anti-Western sentiment; Anti-Zionism; Antisemitism; Xenophobia
- Political position: Far-right
- Religion: Serbian Orthodox Church
- Colors: Red White

Party flag

Website
- akcija.org (Serbian) akcija.org/serbian-action (English)

Serbian Action (Serbian: Србска Акција, romanized: Srbska Akcija) is an ultranationalist and clerical fascist movement, active in Serbia since 2010.

== Ideology ==
Ideals of Serbian Action are largely based on teachings of saint Nikolaj Velimirović and Serbian politician Dimitrije Ljotić, leader of the fascist movement ZBOR. Orthodox Christianity is seen as one of the main pillars of society and they are strongly against secularism, advocating for the restoration of Orthodox monarchy that would be "expressed through the testamental Serbian vertical: God - King – Homekeeper". Greater cooperation between Christian Orthodox nations are presented as alternative to EU integrations. Serbian Action also holds strong anti-democratic views and expresses the idea of Parliament made up of representatives of professions rather than representatives of political parties. Considering themselves as pan-European and anti-Zionist, their actions are against multiculturalism, promotion of LGBT rights and drug legalization and for preservation of Serbian people and their biological survival.

Furthermore, Serbian Action presents itself as third positionist and as an Orthodox Christian revolutionary nationalist movement, asserting that nationalism and fight for social justice are linked.

Activists of Serbian Action are encouraged to improve themselves spiritually and physically, all in purpose to become a "political soldier".

The organization is often described in the media, by political opponents and certain observers as neo-fascist or neo-Nazi. However, other academics suggest that accusations of neo-Nazism are based on the fact that Serbian Action uses the celtic cross and shows sympathy for Dimitrije Ljotić and Milan Nedić, although its ideology is primarily clericalist and Christian nationalist; so that Serbian Action would rather be comparable to Obraz, with some neo-Nazi aspects within the organisation.

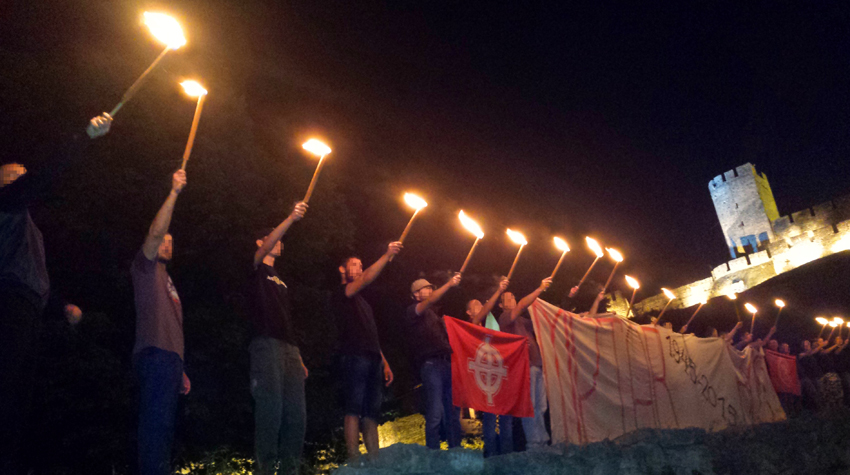
Activists of Serbian Action honoring with torchlight 70 years since the death of Serbian ideologist Dimitrije Ljotić.

== History ==
Serbian Action was founded by a young lawyer who graduated from the University of Belgrade Faculty of Law in early 2010.

Serbian Action became more known to the public in late 2014, when authorities arrested some of their members for hate speech, for distributing flyers against illegal settlements of Romani people and inviting to lynch them. The hate propaganda of Serbian Action was strongly condemned by the Serbian political class, and at the top of the state by Kori Udovički, vice-president of the government. In this year 2014, the far-right group gathered around fifty members and sympathizers, students aged 20 to 32 for the most part.

After the outbreak of the war in Donbas, a couple of activists from Serbian Action volunteered and fought on the separatist side. They have criticized the Serbian government for tolerating the volunteering of people to ISIS, but persecuting volunteers from Ukraine.

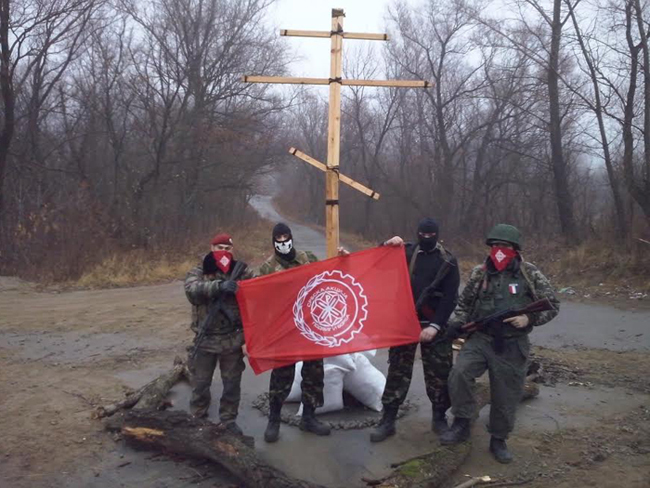
Serbian Action volunteers in Ukraine

In 2014, Serbian Action members attended a yearly Polish march in support of the Serbian claim on Kosovo, named "Kosowo jest serbskie" (Kosovo is Serbia).

In May 2014, during the large floods, activists of Serbian Action volunteered with supplies and men to help people that were affected by the tragedy.

On the 11th of July, Serbian Action published a text on their site, "Ђенерале, хвала ти!" ("General, thank you!"), giving thanks to Ratko Mladić for the massacre in Srebrenica, where they say that the massacre of 8,000 Bosniaks is Western anti-Serbian propaganda.

On the 22nd of March 2015, Serbian Action attended a Russian international conservative forum.

Serbian Action is also active on universities, organizing meetings and protests. The authority banned their meetings on the subject of Communist crimes, in response to which Serbian Action claimed that the Communists and their repressions are still present in universities.

In 2015 they organized a student march to mark 20 years since Operation Storm, and to protest Croatian celebration of it. Thousands attended the march.

During the peak of the immigrant crisis in Europe, Serbian Action called for a protest against immigration and asylum seekers. The protest was banned by Serbian police, who prevented anyone from attending.

On the 19th of September, Serbian Action organized a march with the slogan "For healthy Serbia". It was a counter-march to an LGBT parade. Around one thousand people attended.

They are known for glorification of Milan Nedić, the leader of the Serbian puppet government during World War II, who collaborated with the Germans and was responsible for persecution of Jews and Serbian communists during war. In February 2018, members of Serbian Action were among some 50 far-right activists protesting in Belgrade in memory of Nedić, whose descendants are calling for rehabilitation.

== International cooperation ==
Serbian Action has strong cooperation with Greek nationalist party Golden Dawn. They have exchanged visits on marches and supported each other. In 2013 activists of Serbian Action demonstrated and distributed propaganda material in support of persecuted members of Golden Dawn. In the same year, Golden Dawn representative joined and supported march of Serbian Action. In 2015, Serbian Action congratulated Golden Dawn on their result of 7,5% vote.
