= 2027 Slovenian presidential election =

- by October 2027
Incumbent President
Nataša Pirc Musar
Independent

Presidential elections are scheduled to be held in Slovenia by October 2027.

== Electoral system ==
The President of Slovenia is elected using the two-round system; if no candidate receives a majority of the vote in the first round, the top two candidates contest a runoff.

Under Slovenia's election law, candidates for president are required to meet one of three criteria:

- The support of ten members of the National Assembly
- The support of one or more political parties and either three members of the National Assembly or signatures from 3,000 voters
- Signatures from 5,000 voters

Each political party could support only one candidate.

== Candidates ==
=== Declared ===
Candidate	Born	Experience	Campaign announced	Ref
Alen Koman	October 9, 1988 (age 37); Zgornje Jezersko	Catholic commentator	June 25, 2026	

==== Alen Koman ====
Alen Koman is a political activist, Catholic commentator, and founder of the Straža Party, which he has led since its establishment in 2026. Prior to entering politics, Koman was known as the creator of Scutum Fidei, a media platform focused on Catholic traditionalism, conservative social values, and Slovenian national identity. Koman has frequently been regarded as a prominent figure within Slovenia's Catholic nationalist movement, most notably for his advocacy of traditional Christian values, opposition to abortion, criticism of immigration policies, and promotion of demographic and family-oriented policies.

==== Speculated by the media ====
Potential candidates
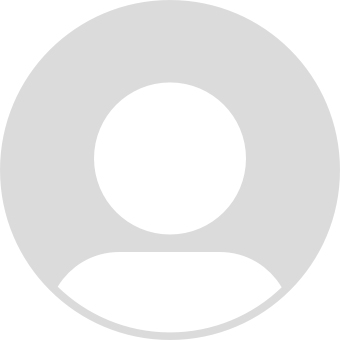
Law Professor
Matej Avbelj

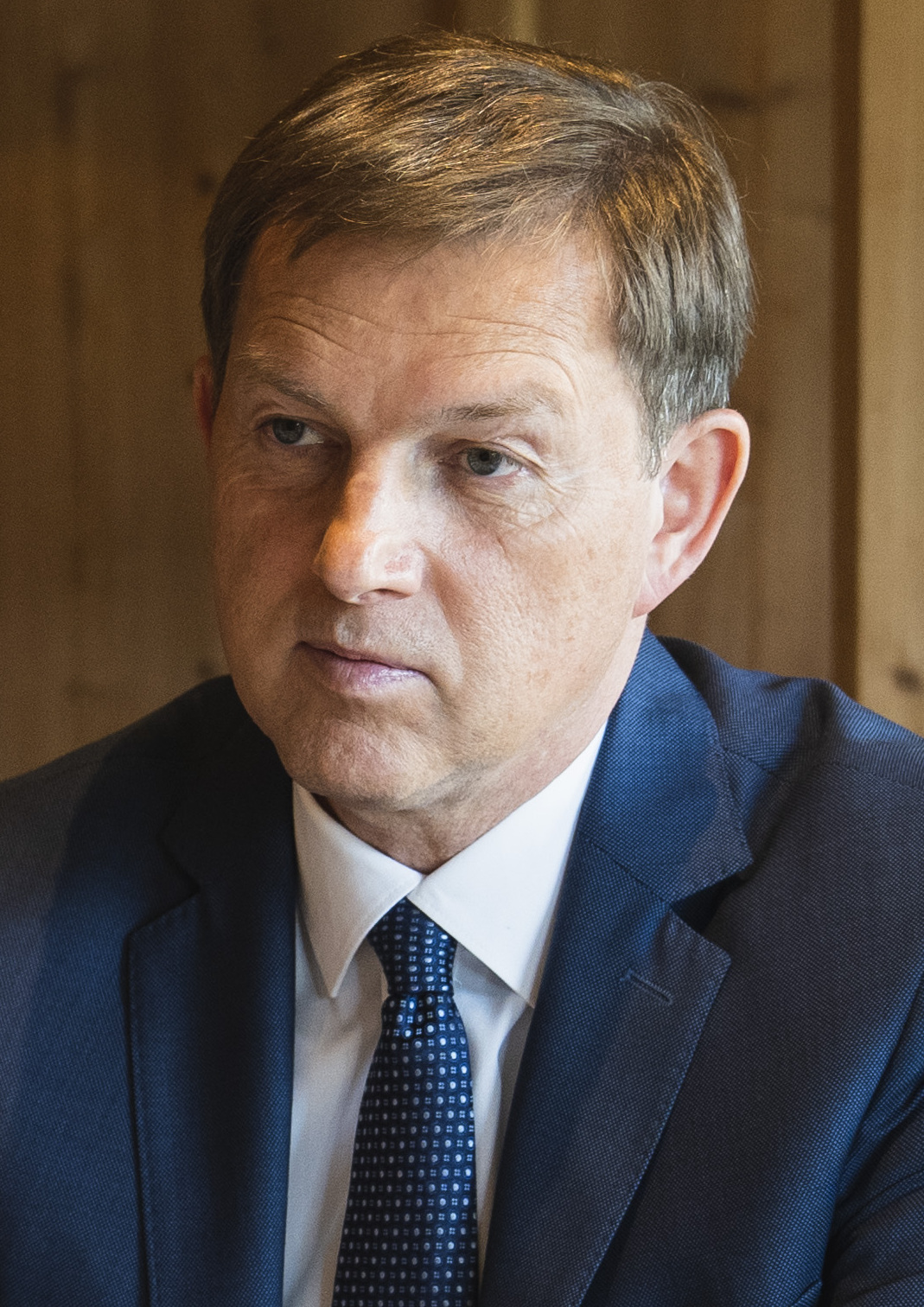
Former Prime Minister
Miro Cerar
(2014–2018)

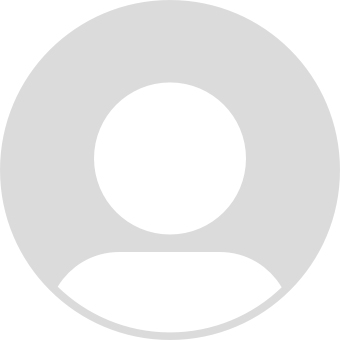
Former Justice of the Constitutional Court
Klemen Jaklič
(2017–2026)

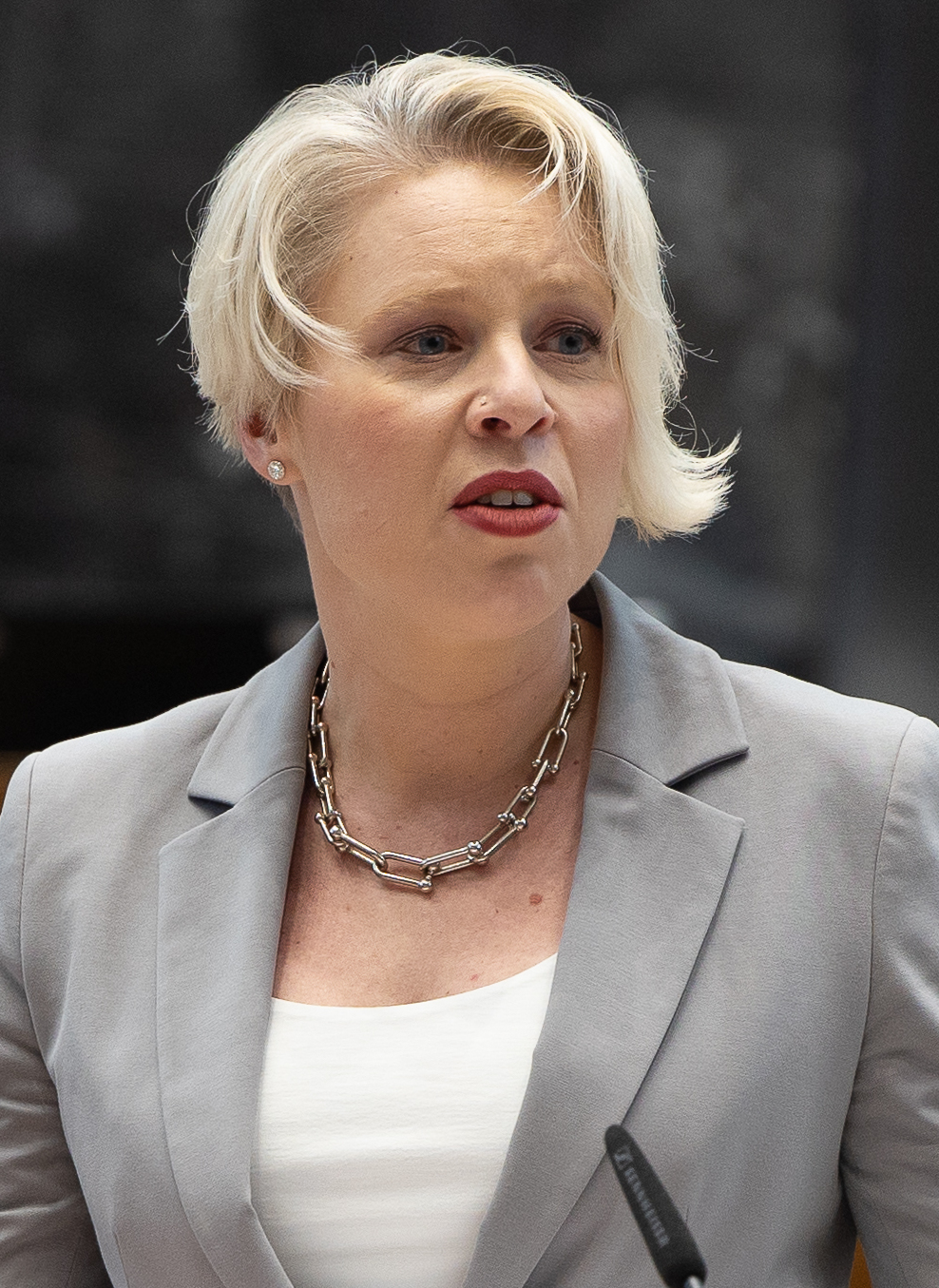
Former President of the National Assembly
Urška Klakočar Zupančič
(2022–2026)

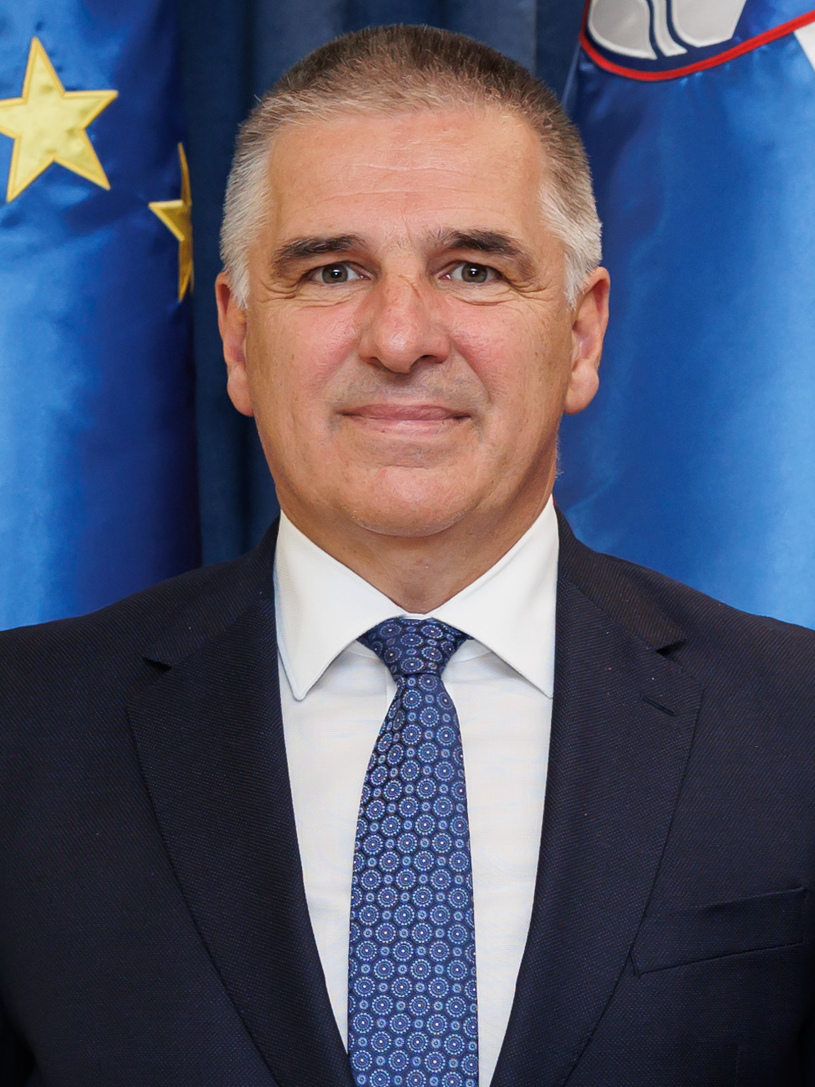
President of the National Council
Marko Lotrič
(2022–present)

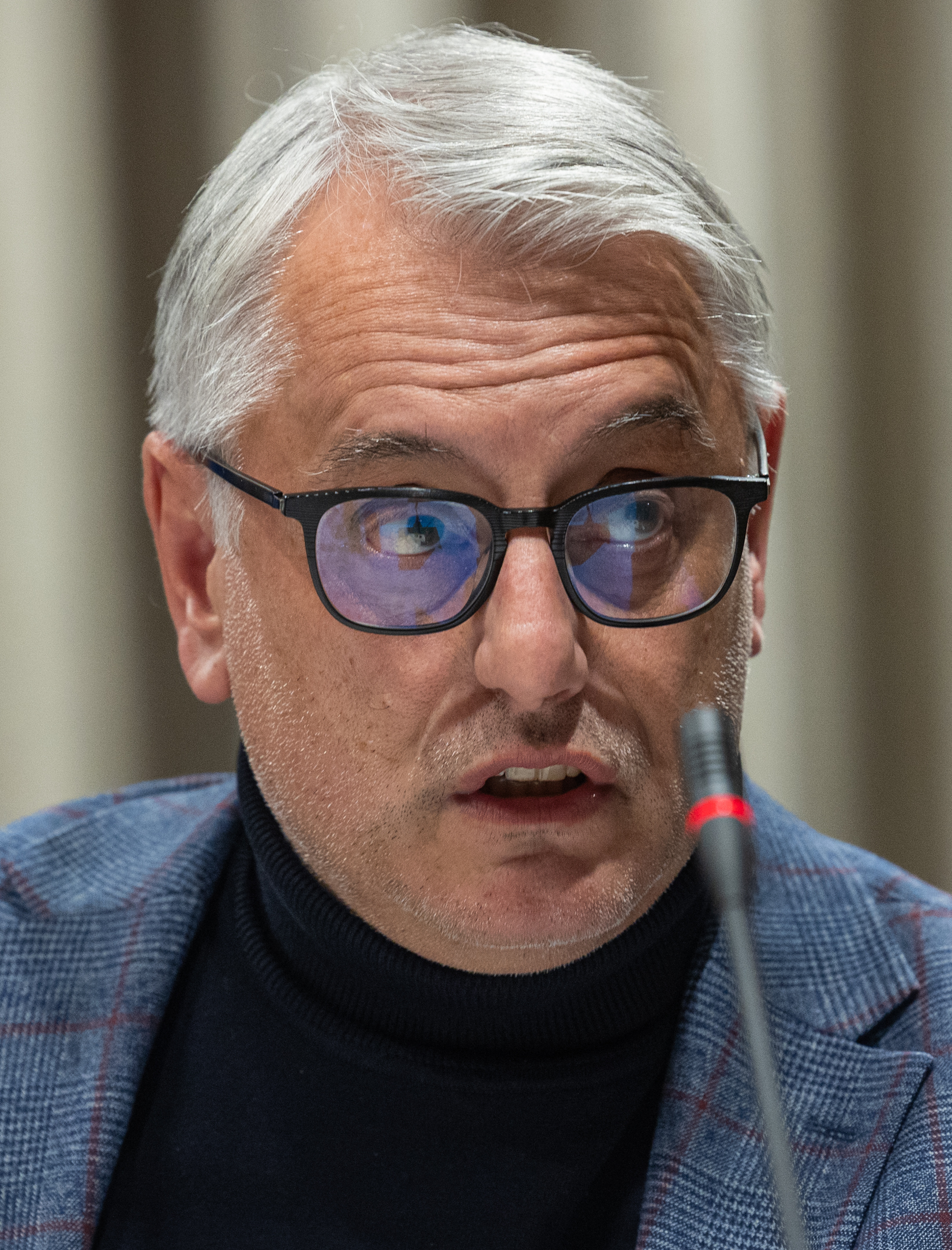
MP for Radeče
Matjaž Han
(2004–present)

===== Matej Avbelj =====
Matej Avbelj is a Slovenian legal scholar, constitutional law expert and professor of European law at New University. He graduated from the Faculty of Law, University of Ljubljana, obtained a Master of Laws degree from New York University School of Law, and earned his doctorate from the European University Institute in Florence. Avbelj has published extensively on European Union law, constitutional law, democracy, the rule of law and human rights. He has also served as editor-in-chief of the Commentary on the Constitution of the Republic of Slovenia and was named Slovenian Lawyer of the Year in 2023. In November 2026, Avbelj was mentioned by media reports as a potential candidate, although he had not publicly announced his candidacy.

===== Miro Cerar =====
Miro Cerar served as Prime Minister of Slovenia from 2014 to 2018, and previously served as Deputy Prime Minister and Minister of Foreign Affairs from 2018 to 2020. Cerar has frequently been regarded as a centrist politician and legal scholar, most notably for founding the Modern Centre Party, leading Slovenia's government after the 2014 parliamentary election, and advocating the rule of law and European integration. Cerar has been mentioned as a possible candidate. When asked about a potential candidacy, he confirmed to N1 that several people had encouraged him to run, stating: "It is true that people have been encouraging me to run, but at the moment I am not giving it much thought. I may have to consider it in the future if there is a great deal of encouragement. For now, however, I am fully focused on my duties as dean and on my teaching work."

===== Klemen Jaklič =====
Klemen Jaklič served as a Judge of the Constitutional Court of Slovenia from 2017 to 2026. Prior to his appointment, he taught constitutional law at Harvard University and pursued an academic career focused on constitutional law, human rights, and democratic theory. Jaklič has frequently been regarded as one of Slovenia's most prominent constitutional scholars, most notably for his judicial opinions on constitutional and electoral matters, his work on constitutional pluralism, and his public criticism of what he described as weaknesses in Slovenia's rule of law and democratic institutions. Following the end of his term on the Constitutional Court in 2026, Jaklič was increasingly mentioned as a potential candidate for higher elected office, including the presidency of Slovenia, though he had yet to formally announce any candidacy.

===== Urška Klakočar Zupančič =====
Urška Klakočar Zupančič served as the President of the National Assembly of Slovenia from 2022 to 2026, becoming the first woman to hold the position. Prior to entering national politics, she worked as a judge and later as a legal adviser, before being elected to the National Assembly as a member of the Freedom Movement in 2022. During her political career, Klakočar Zupančič became known for her outspoken political style, advocacy of human rights and the rule of law, and her prominent role in Slovenian national politics. Following the end of her parliamentary career in 2026, she remained politically active and, together with former prime minister Anton Rop, began establishing the List of Urška Klakočar Zupančič and Anton Rop, a political list set to contest the 2026 local elections in Ljubljana. Rop was subsequently announced as the list's candidate for Mayor of Ljubljana, while Klakočar Zupančič announced that she would stand for the Ljubljana City Council. Her decision not to run for mayor, together with remarks that her political "time will come" and indications that she had not said her last word in politics, prompted speculation about her future political ambitions, including a possible candidacy for President of Slovenia.

===== Marko Lotrič =====
Marko Lotrič is a Slovenian entrepreneur and politician who has served as President of the National Council since December 2022. Before entering politics, he established himself as a businessman and founded LOTRIČ Metrology, a company specializing in measurement and metrology services. Lotrič has also been active in representing the interests of Slovenian entrepreneurs and small businesses and has founded his own party FOCUS of Marko Lotrič in January 2025.

Lotrič has been mentioned as a potential candidate. In an interview with N1, he stated that the presidential election was still quite some time away and that he had not yet given a potential candidacy serious consideration. However, he acknowledged that the idea had already been raised during conversations at various events he had attended, adding that many challenges remained to be addressed before the election.

===== Matjaž Han =====
Matjaž Han has served as a Member of Parliament for Radeče since 2004, except during his tenure as Minister of the Economy, Labour and Sport from 2022 to 2026. During his parliamentary career, he served as Mayor of Radeče from 2006 to 2011 and was the long-time leader of the parliamentary group of the Social Democrats (SD). Before entering national politics, Han worked as director of a family-owned company. Since 2024, he has served as President of the Social Democrats. According to sources within the Social Democrats cited in media reports, Han has been discussed within the party as a potential candidate. The reports also suggested that, should Han decide to run for president, he would most likely be succeeded as party leader by either Matjaž Nemec or Luka Goršek.

===== Nataša Pirc Musar =====
Nataša Pirc Musar has served as President of Slovenia since 2022, and previously served as Information Commissioner of Slovenia from 2004 to 2014. Prior to entering politics, Pirc Musar worked as a journalist, lawyer, and advocate for privacy rights and freedom of information. Pirc Musar has frequently been regarded as one of Slovenia's most prominent liberal public figures, most notably for her work on data protection, human rights, government transparency, and her election as Slovenia's first female president. Throughout her presidency, she has emphasized the rule of law, democratic values, environmental sustainability, and a stronger role for Slovenia within the European Union.

In August 2026, Pirc Musar became involved in controversy following a traffic accident in the Kastelec tunnel in which she was injured while travelling in an official vehicle. One of her fellow passengers was subsequently identified as Viktorija Krivolutskaya, a Russian-born Slovenian citizen and a personal acquaintance of Pirc Musar. The President's office initially declined to disclose the identities of the two women travelling with her, while police later confirmed that one of the injured passengers was a Russian citizen. Media reports subsequently drew attention to Krivolutskaya's personal and reported business connections with Pirc Musar and her family. Krivolutskaya, who obtained Slovenian citizenship through extraordinary naturalisation in 2016, had been subject to security checks by both the Slovenian National Police Force and the Slovenian Intelligence and Security Agency during the naturalisation process. The episode, sometimes referred to in media and political discussion as the Krivolutskaya affair, prompted questions about the President's security arrangements and the circumstances surrounding her relationship with Krivolutskaya.

Pirc Musar is eligible to seek a second presidential term, though she has yet to formally announce her intentions regarding a re-election campaign.

=== Declined to run ===
The following individuals have, as of November 2026, publicly denied interest in being a candidate:

- Borut Pahor, 4th president (2012–2022), 6th prime minister (2008-2012), MEP (2004-2008) and 5th speaker of the National Assembly (2000–2004).
- Vladimir Prebilič, MEP (2024-present), 2nd Mayor of Kočevje (2010–2024) and candidate for president in 2022.
