= South African Gentile National Socialist Movement =

South African Nazi movement (1932–1949)

Greyshirts or Gryshemde is the common short-form name given to the South African Gentile National Socialist Movement, a South African Nazi, fascist movement that existed during the 1930s and 1940s. Initially referring only to a paramilitary group, it soon became shorthand for the movement as a whole.

The NSDAP/AO arrived in South Africa in 1932 and as a result a number of groups sympathetic to Nazism emerged. The most notable of these was the South African Gentile National Socialist Movement (also known as the South African Christian National Socialist Movement), formed by Louis Weichardt the following year. A fiercely antisemitic group, it organised the Gryshemde as its equivalent of the Sturmabteilung, although the grey shirt became so associated with the group that it was applied to the movement as a whole. In contrast to some extremist groups the Greyshirts did not split along linguistic lines, but rather sought to work with both the Afrikaans and the English-speaking populations.

The flag and brassard used by Greyshirts was a variation on the flag of Nazi Germany using the colors orange, blue and white in a Nazi swastika configuration; this was done deliberately to reflect the national colors of the then flag of South Africa, the "Oranje-blanje-blou".

The Greyshirts struggled to maintain unity and spawned a number of minor splinter groups, such as Johannes von Moltke's South African Fascists. Most of these groups united under Daniel François Malan's aegis when he formed his 'Purified' National Party, although the Greyshirts did not take part and contested the 1938 election alone. The decision proved unwise, however, as the Greyshirts failed to make any impact. The group was roundly attacked by the National Party, with an article appearing in Die Burger in October 1934 stating that: 'We believe that this party, generally known as the Greyshirts, under the cloak of an anti-Jewish movement, strives for a dangerous form of government in South Africa. The Greyshirts have as their aim to set up a dictator in South Africa.'

Jewish immigration from Nazi Germany to South Africa grew significantly during the 1930s and the Greyshirts launched a campaign calling for an end to the practice. A ship was chartered by the Council for German Jewry, a UK-based group, to bring as many Jews as possible to Cape Town, leading to the Greyshirts organising a mass protest against the move. The scale of opposition was such that Sarah Millin appealed to Jan Smuts to deal with the Greyshirts, although her request was ignored. Indeed, relations between the National Party and the Greyshirts actually improved, initially as a result of a 1937 letter from Frans Erasmus, at the time Secretary of the National Party, praising the Greyshirts for bringing the "Jewish problem" to the fore and culminating in a number of leading Greyshirts also holding National Party membership.

Activities were monitored during the Second World War, although the Greyshirts continued to exist and renamed themselves the White Workers Party in 1949. However, by this time most of the membership had been lost to the Ossewabrandwag or Oswald Pirow's proto-fascist New Order, both of which were marginalised and lost their supporters to the Herenigde Nasionale Party, which went on to win the general election and rule the country for 46 years. After this point the Greyshirts/WWP became a wholly marginal phenomenon.

== See also ==
- Afrikaner Weerstandsbeweging
- Blanke Bevrydingsbeweging (1985-1988)
- British Union of Fascists, whose party nickname was "Blackshirts"
- Conservative Workers' Party
