= Louis Weichardt =

Senator for Natal Province
- In office 1956–1970
- Constituency: Natal

Personal details
- Born: 21 May 1894 Paarl, Cape Colony
- Died: 26 October 1985 (aged 91)
- Party: National Party (1948–1970); New Order (1946–1948); South African Christian National Socialist Movement (1933–1948)

Louis Theodor Weichardt (21 May 1894 – 26 October 1985) was a South African political leader, born in Paarl of German extraction, who founded the Greyshirts, a Nazi organization.

In Cape Town, on 26 October 1933, Weichardt founded the South African Christian National Socialist Spider Movement with a paramilitary section (modeled on Nazi Germany's brown-shirted Sturmabteilung) called the Gryshemde or Grayshirts. He was interned during World War II, and released from custody in 1946. Afterwards, he worked with Oswald Pirow's New Order. Disbanding his party in 1948, Weichardt gave his allegiance to Daniel François Malan's National Party. He became senator from Natal Province from 1956 to 1970.
