= Michal Semín =

Czech journalist

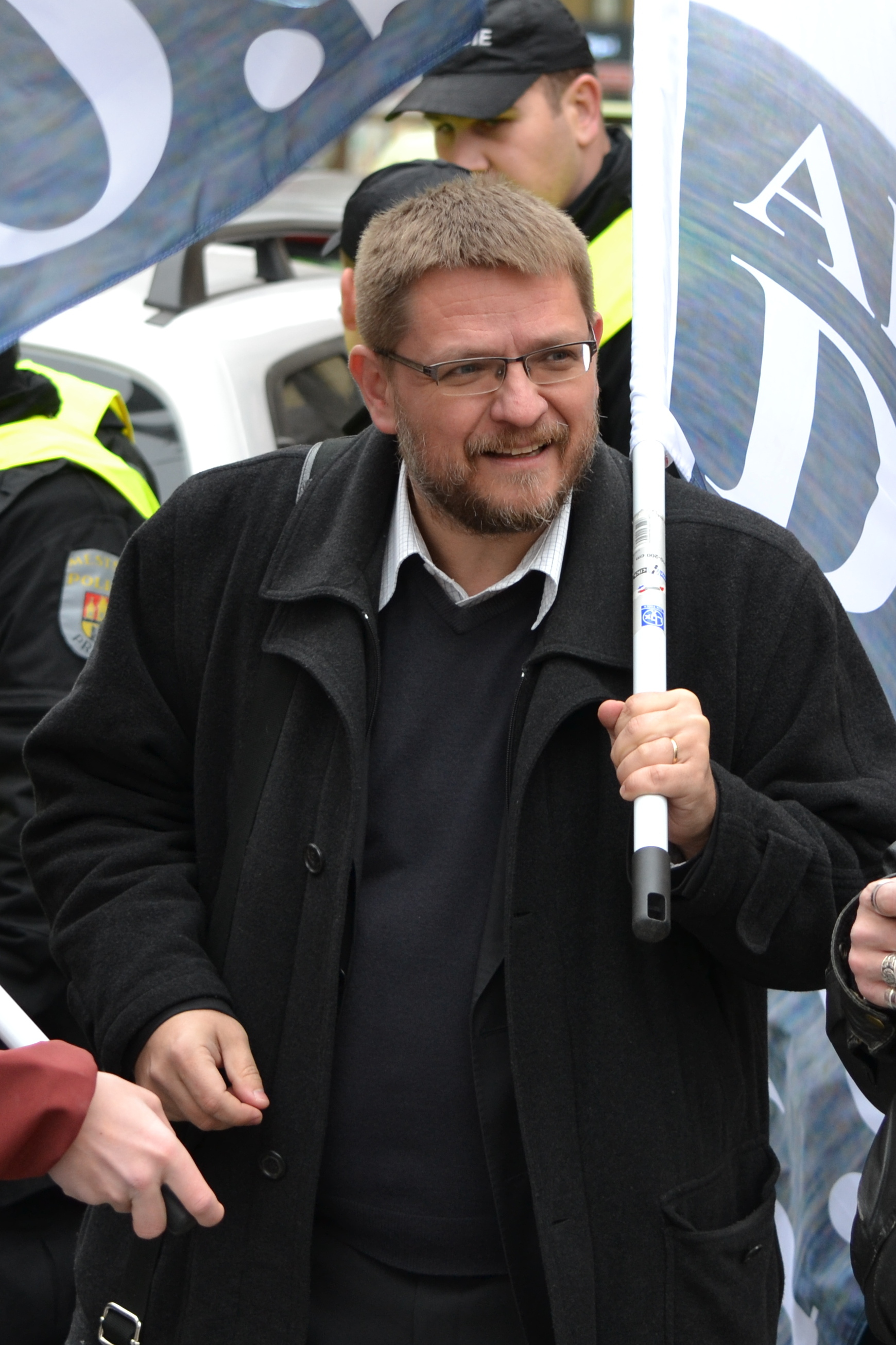
- Semín in 2012
- Born: 21 September 1967 (age 59); Prague, Czechoslovakia
- Citizenship: Czech Republic
- Education: Czech language and pedagogy
- Alma mater: Pedagogical Faculty, Charles University
- Occupations: Journalist, commentator, translator, writer, conservative activist
- Organization(s): Civic Institute (1991–2003), Saint Joseph Institute (2004–2014), Akce D.O.S.T (2010–), Svatopluk Association (2022–)
- Known for: Advocacy of traditional Catholic values, promotion of homeschooling, opposition to abortion, state-recognized same-sex unions, feminism, and pro-Russian views
- Spouse: Married (1993)
- Children: 9

Michal Semín (born 21 September 1967) is a Czech journalist, political commentator, translator, writer and conservative activist. He is a prominent advocate for traditional Catholic values, the family as the foundation of society, and homeschooling. Semín has held leadership roles in several conservative organizations like Civic Institute, Saint Joseph Institute, Akce D.O.S.T., Svatopluk Association and is a regular contributor to alternative media outlets. Critics accuse him of spreading conspiracy theories and holding views perceived as antisemitic or pro-Russian.

== Early life and education ==
Semín studied Czech language and pedagogy at the Pedagogical Faculty of Charles University in Prague. In the late 1980s, he was involved in dissident activities, including the Movement for Civic Freedom, and helped launch the independent student movement Stuha (lit. 'ribbon'). On 13 November 1989, he was expelled from the university for his anti-communist involvement. He was also one of the conveners of the student demonstration on 17 November 1989, a key moment of the Velvet Revolution in Czechoslovakia.

== Career ==
After the Velvet Revolution, Semín co-founded the Civic Institute (Občanský institut), a Czech conservative think tank based in Prague. The institute describes itself as “a non-state, non-partisan, non-profit educational institution of conservative orientation” and was formally created on 30 May 1990.

In 1997, the Civic Institute was a co-organizer of the first World Congress of Families (WCF) in Prague, and as the head of the Civic Institute, Semín was personally involved in organizing activities under the supervision of Allan C. Carlson, who was the founder and leader of the congress and president of the Howard Center for Family, Religion and Society. The WCF project itself had been conceived by Carlson in January 1995 following meetings in Moscow with Russian sociologist Anatoly Antonov of Moscow State University and fellow demographer Viktor Medkov to explore U.S.-Russian collaboration on demographic and family issues. According to Carlson, the idea for an international congress emerged during discussions at the apartment of Ivan Shevchenko, an Orthodox mystic and chairman of the Brotherhood of Scientists and Specialists "Tabor". Immediately after the Moscow meetings, Carlson traveled to Prague to attend a conference organized by the Civic Institute and formally proposed the congress to Civic Institute leader Semín, who agreed to co-organize and host the event.

A year later, in 1998, Semín spoke at the second WCF with Michaela Freiová, who also worked for the institute, and was also a speaker at the third congress in 2004 in Mexico City.

Semín is credited with being at the forefront of introducing homeschooling in the Czech Republic, where he advocated for its legalization in the 1990s and founded the Czech Home School Association (Společnost přátel domácí školy) in 1997 as its first chairman. This organization played a key role in lobbying for homeschooling rights.

Semín was a founding member and the first chairman of Una Voce Česká republika, the Czech branch of the International Federation Una Voce (FIUV), which promoted and preserved the traditional Latin Mass and pre-Vatican II Catholic liturgical practices. He had initiated the association in 1997, and it was formally registered with the Czech Ministry of the Interior in 1998, with Semín serving as chairman until 2000. The Czech Catholic Church, including Cardinal Miloslav Vlk, criticizes Una Voce for alleged ties to Lefebvrists (FSSPX), schismatic tendencies, extremism, and connections to far-right groups, leading to warnings against their activities and publications. The warning also specifically concerned the magazine Te Deum and the Saint Joseph Institute, both associated with Semín.

Semín led Civic Institute until 2003, when he left the institute and was succeeded by Roman Joch. In 2019, he explained that he left the institute after growing concerned that the increasing demands of U.S. sponsors - some allegedly linked to intelligence services - were influencing its activities and that foreign interests were being promoted through the institute. Despite this perspective and some differences of opinion with the current Civic Institute, for example, Semín is a critic of American neoconservative and Israeli foreign policy, he continued to cooperate with this organization.

After leaving the Civic Institute in 2003 (some sources state it was at the turn of 2004 and 2005), he founded the Saint Joseph Institute (Czech: Institut svatého Josefa) in 2004 with the consent of Fr. Tomáš Stritzko of the FSSPX. He served as its chairman until the institute suspended its activities in June 2014 due to internal conflicts within traditional Catholic circles. Semín cited the persistent hostile attitude of Fr. Stritzko towards him and his activities as the reason. The Institute aimed to support Catholic education, including homeschooling, through lectures, seminars, courses, and publications, while promoting a deeper understanding of Catholic social teaching and doctrine. It also sought to connect traditionalist Catholics in the US and Europe through joint initiatives, conferences, and pilgrimages.

In the 2009 European Parliament elections, he ran unsuccessfully on the candidate list of the Free Citizens’ Party, receiving only 209 preference votes.

After Ladislav Bátora's resignation, Semín was elected in December 2011 as president of the civic association Akce D.O.S.T. (Czech: 'Důvěra, Objektivita, Svoboda, Tradice' - lit. 'Trust, Objectivity, Freedom, Tradition'), a position he held until 2014, when he was succeeded by Petr Bahník. The association had been registered in 2010 and was established as a civic initiative based on the D.O.S.T. Manifesto, which was published on 7 November 2007. Semín was a co-author of the Manifesto, its first signatory, and one of the three initiators, together with Jiří Hejlek and Petr Bahník. He was also a co-author and the first signatory of the memorandum "We Support Our President," issued in May 2009 in support of President Václav Klaus. The group also organized a supportive demonstration, including a protest against a book criticizing Klaus in October 2010.

Since 2010, Akce D.O.S.T. has organized a series of discussion evenings titled Hovory na pravici (lit. 'Talks on the Right'), with active involvement from Semín. The events have featured international speakers, including Nigel Farage (2012), John Laughland (2012, 2014), Toni Brandi (2015), Alexey Komov (2015), and Petr Bystroň (2016), Jean-Pierre Hottinger, with prominent Czech figures such as former President Václav Klaus, politicians associated with him like Ladislav Jakl, Petr Hájek, and other notable politicians like Tomio Okamura (SPD).

In July 2012, as chairman of the Akce D.O.S.T., Semín criticized public Czech Television (ČT) for serving as the official media partner of the Prague Pride 2012 festival and demanded ČT withdraw from its media partnership. The organization sent formal protest letters to ČT's director general Petr Dvořák and to the Council of Czech Television, arguing that a publicly funded broadcaster financed by license fees was obliged to remain strictly impartial.

In August 2012, international pro-family organizations issued a declaration protesting U.S. Embassy support for Prague Pride, appreciating Michal Semín and Czech representatives for defending the natural family. It was signed by over 100 figures, including Allan C. Carlson, Larry Jacobs of the World Congress of Families, Alexey Komov, Pavel Parfentiev, Igor Beloborodov, Jennifer Roback Morse and groups like Alliance Defending Freedom and Family Watch International.

In 2013, Semín supported the manifesto "Democrats of Europe, wake up!", initiated by then Czech president Václav Klaus. It was presented as a counter-reaction to the transnational initiative "Young Europeans, unite!", which advocated deeper EU integration through civic mobilization against far-right nationalism. The signatories criticized the initiative as ideologically biased, with links to far-left figures, and warned that it risked reviving communist-style social engineering within the European Union. The signatories largely consisted of associates of the Václav Klaus Institute, along with Nigel Farage and John Laughland.

During the 2010s, Semín remained involved in activities of World Congress of Families (WCF). In the outlet Lidové Noviny, stated that he spoke at the 2014 international forum "Large Family and the Future of Humanity" in Moscow. This claim is supported by a leaked document listing foreign participants, which identifies him as a confirmed speaker associated with the WCF speakers group, with a proposed presentation on homeschooling, and notes that his plane ticket was sponsored by the St. Andrew the First-Called Foundation, chaired by Vladimir Yakunin. In the forum program, he is listed as an employee of Václav Klaus Institute. The forum, held at the Kremlin on 10-11 September, replaced the cancelled WCF VIII following Western sanctions imposed after the annexation of Crimea. Participants included Russian oligarch Malofeev and Yakunin, Patriarch Kirill, Metropolitan Hilarion, as well as WCF representatives Don Feder and Larry Jacobs. Semín was also labeled as an event partner at WCF IX in Salt Lake City in 2015, and according to the outlet Hlídací Pes, Semín also attended WCF XII in 2018 in Chișinău, Moldova.

In early November 2017, Semín participated in the first international conference on the Fatima message in Russia, held in Moscow and organized by the Canadian Fatima Center in cooperation with the Priestly Fraternity of St. Pius X (FSSPX). The event took place near the Kremlin and was led by FSSPX Superior General Bernard Fellay, with participation from traditional Russian Catholics.

In 2019, nomination of Semín by the SPD party to the Council of Czech News Agency (ČTK) sparked significant controversy, with critics accusing him of spreading conspiracy theories and holding views perceived as antisemitic or pro-Russian. The nomination ultimately failed amid strong political opposition. He was also described as an anti-Judaist by the Federation of Jewish Communities in the Czech Republic.

In 2020, together with businessman David Částek and Tomáš Kulman, who became its president, he co-founded the association Patrimonium Sancti Adalberti (PSA), which according to Czech media organizes conferences with far-right and pro-Russian circles and cooperates with NGO ecosystem of Orbán government. Semín also attended such conferences under its auspices. Částek had previously served on the supervisory board of the Russian ERB Bank, which was stripped of its license by the Czech National Bank due to financial irregularities. According to Czech media, Kulman continued to praise Russian President Vladimir Putin as late as 2022.

In November 2022 Semín co-founderd the Spolek Svatopluk (Svatopluk association) with Petr Drulák and Ilona Švihlíková The aim of the association is to unite people of various political convictions. The association focuses on organizing political discussions. Its activities include organizing debates, lectures, trips, cultural events, and conferences focused on topics such as politics, education, economy, and national identity. In Czech and Slovak media, it is labeled as pro-Russian, supporting Russian propaganda, which links the association's pan-Slavic ideas with militarization, fascist symbolism and ideology, and parties from the extreme spectrum such as Stačilo! and SPD, while calling for a change in the political regime towards authoritarianism and withdrawal from the European Union and NATO.

In 2022, Michal Semín supported the Česká republika na 1. místě! (Czech Republic first!) initiative, which organized large-scale anti-government protests in Prague. The main event was a massive demonstration on September 3, 2022, on Wenceslas Square, attended by an estimated 70,000 people. It expressed dissatisfaction with Prime Minister Petr Fiala's government, particularly over high energy prices, inflation, and the government's stance on Russia's invasion of Ukraine. The protests were often described in Czech media as populist, with pro-Russian undertones due to calls for energy deals with Russia amid the ongoing war, and they attracted participants from various anti-establishment groups, including far-right and communist sympathizers.

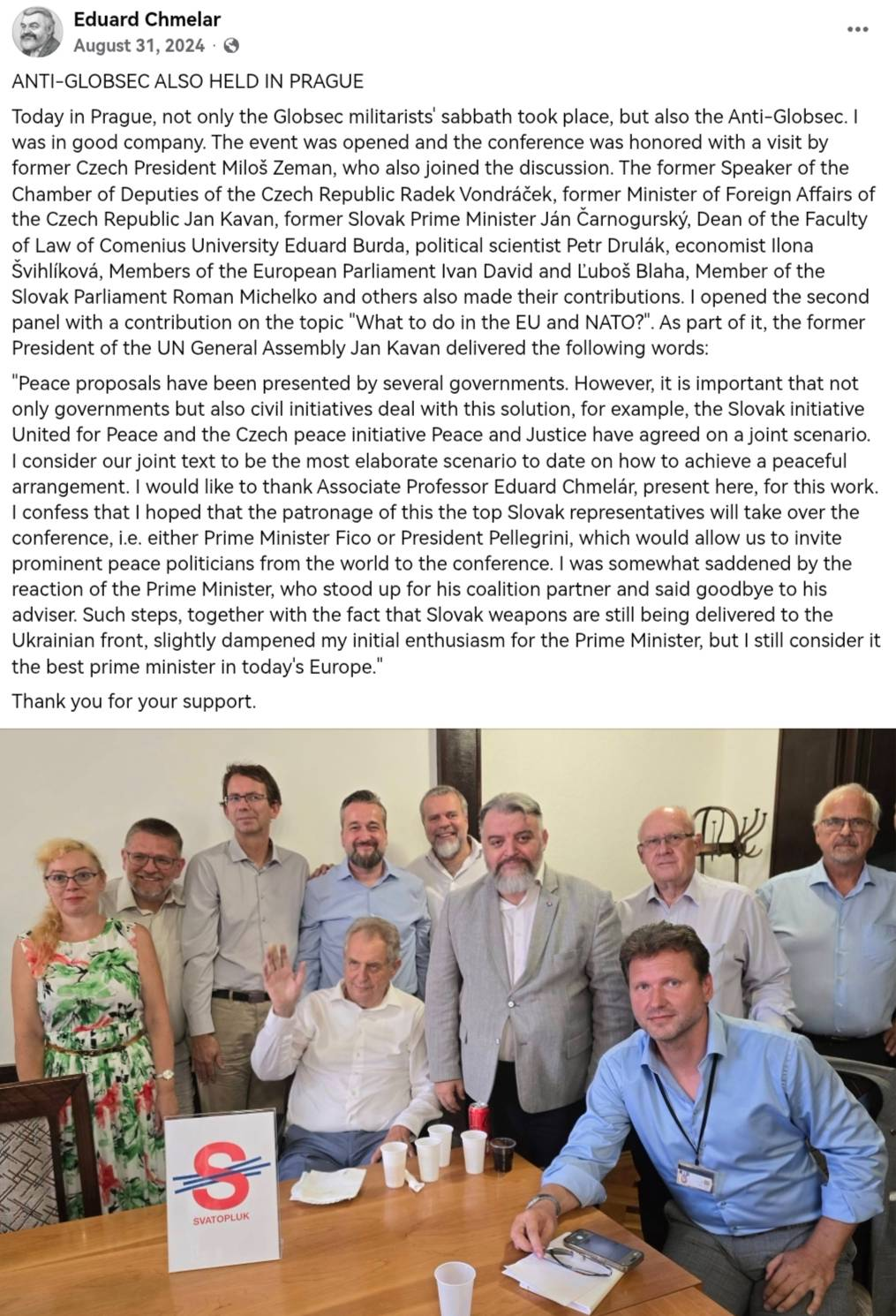
Screenshot from a post by Eduard Chmelár. Anti-Globsec event held in Prague in late August 2024. (Ilona Švihlíková, Michal Semín, Petr Drulák, Miloš Zeman, Ľuboš Blaha, Eduard Chmelár, Radek Vondráček, Jan Kavan, Ivan David)

On 31 August 2024, Semín took part in the "Anti-Globsec" event, organized by Spolek Svatopluk in Prague, as a counter to the Globsec security conference. The closed-door meeting featured pro-Kremlin figures, including former Czech President Miloš Zeman, Slovak MP Ľuboš Blaha, former Slovak PM Ján Čarnogurský, and Czech political scientist Petr Drulák. Critics argued that the event promoted Russian-aligned narratives, criticized Western states for Russia's actions in Ukraine, advocated closer Czech-Slovak-Russian ties, and was described by critics as spreading anti-Western propaganda.

On 9 May 2025, Semín and his colleague from Spolek Svatopluk Drulák visited the Russian Embassy in Prague for its Victory Day celebration, where they presented a letter of thanks to Russian Ambassador to Czech Republic Alexander Zmeyevsky for the liberation of the country from Nazism in 1945. At the official reception they also attended, propaganda films were shown and threats of a "special operation" were issued.

On 31 May 2025, the association held a closed-door meeting in Slovakia, streamed online. Besides Semín, attendees included Slovak PM Robert Fico, Interior Minister Matúš Šutaj Eštok, Parliament Speaker Andrej Danko, former Czech President Miloš Zeman, Czech MEP Kateřina Konečná, and ANO politician Radek Vondráček. The meeting drew criticism for uniting nationalist and communist figures, promoting pro-Russian narratives on Ukraine, calling for constitutional changes in the Czech Republic to strengthen the presidency at the expense of parliamentary and judicial powers, and expressing anti-EU sentiments. Fico used the platform to urge renewed Czech-Slovak dialogue and Visegrád Group cooperation, which then Czech officials rejected due to Slovakia's perceived pro-Russian orientation.

== Media contributions ==
Michal Semín is also active as a publicist. In 2006 he started publishing the traditionalist magazine Te Deum, where he is a member of the editorial board. Since its foundation, Te Deum has been led by editor-in-chief Martin R. Čejka and core editorial team consisting of Michal Kretschmer, Šárka Vorková and Leoš Pluhař, with long-term contributors including Radomír Malý, Petr Bahník, Pavel Zahradník, and Branislav Michalka.

His articles appear in several Czech media outlets, such as Protiproud, Parlamentní listy and Slovak Christianitas.sk. In the past, he appeared occasionally in mainstream media. More recently, he has been active on alternative media platforms such as the online Rádio universum.

Semín has also published through his personal blog on Lidové noviny - Neviditelný pes and later on Echo24.cz - Blogosvět.

Protiproud, Parlamentní listy, Radio Universum, and Christianitas.sk are considered conspiracy or disinformation media.

== Views and controversies ==
Michal Semín holds strongly conservative Christian views and regards the family as the foundation of the state and society. He is opposed to abortion, state-recognized homosexual unions, feminism, and social liberalism. He supports positions associated with Catholic traditionalism, promoted a defended the traditional Latin Mass and pre-Vatican II Catholic liturgical practices. He speaks out against joint prayers with people of other faiths, such as Muslims or Hindus, and against ecumenism in general. and has criticized U.S. neoconservative foreign policy and aspects of Israeli policy.

In a 2004 interview with Chronicles magazine by Srđa Trifković, Semín characterized the communist era in Czechoslovakia as a multifaceted period, acknowledging the severe political repression of the 1950s while suggesting that later decades preserved certain aspects of family life and social stability that secular liberalism has since eroded. He argued that contemporary Western liberalism poses a more insidious threat to traditional social norms than historic communism.

In the context of his criticism of Czech Television (ČT) for serving as the official media partner of the Prague Pride 2012 festival, Semín declared:

"Czech Television is a tool of left-wing propaganda of neo-Marxist trends, which also includes homosexualism, and that ČT is not impartial. With our money it supports the distasteful lifestyle of homosexuals, which is often marked by promiscuous sexual behaviour and the spread of various sexually transmitted diseases."

The statement was widely reported and later resurfaced in Czech media in June-July 2019 during the parliamentary debate over Semín's nomination by the SPD party to the Council of the Czech News Agency (ČTK). In 2014, in his report for Lidové noviny from the international forum “Large Family and the Future of Humanity,” Semín wrote about Russian oligarch Vladimir Yakunin in connection with the sanctions imposed on him by the West as part of a broader response to Russian annexation of Crimea and its military actions in Ukraine:

"Can you imagine any CEO of a state railway company here or elsewhere in Europe speaking about the evil of abortion, the destructive impact of nihilism and postmodern philosophy on the moral state of society, or the need to support the importance of motherhood and fatherhood? Warning against the global financial oligarchy that seeks to destroy originally Christian nations by undermining the natural family? In Russia, they have such a director - Vladimir Yakunin, who belongs to the closest circle of Putin’s collaborators. Presumably for this reason, he, together with Yelena Mizulina, another prominent figure of the Moscow conference and the main architect of contemporary Russian pro-family policy, ended up on the list of individuals targeted by Western sanctions."

In an interview for Parlamentní listy on 6 September 2016, Semín questioned the official account of the 11 September 2001 attacks, describing it as:

"The official interpretation of the events of 11 September is a fairy tale, in some respects even less credible than the conspiracy theories you mentioned. Of all the possible scenarios, the one that seems most probable to me is the one that allows for the involvement of part of the power structures within the American elites in the preparation and execution of the attacks. Whether the regime of Saudi Arabia had a hand in it, I do not know. Certainly, for example, Israel benefited far more from the situation and the subsequent invasions. After all, one of the motives of the foreign policy of American neoconservatives, also in view of their predominantly ethnic composition, is not primarily the benefit of the USA, but of Israel.(...) I would not suspect George Bush of direct involvement in organising the 11 September 2001 attacks, not because he would not have the stomach for it. He simply did not have the brains for it. But in the case of people like Wolfowitz, Perle or Rumsfeld, I can imagine it."

In 2019, Semín appeared on the program Na prahu změn, where he spoke about his experience with funding for the Civic Institute from US sponsors, which he cited as one of the reasons that contributed to his decision to leave the Institute:

"Over the years, I began to watch with some nervousness as the demands of American sponsors escalated, requiring us to support this or that, and with some of those sponsors, it started to become apparent that they were connected to intelligence services and had other hidden interests in their activities in Central Europe.(...) I started asking myself whether this was a suitable role for the Občanský institut. Over those years, it became clear that more than ideas, foreign interests were being promoted through us without us being able to significantly influence it. This is how American neoconservatism was spread."

== Personal life ==
Michal Semín is married since 1993 and has nine children. Together with his wife, the couple decided to homeschool most of their children after encountering the practice during travels abroad in the 1990s. He is a practicing traditionalist Catholic.
