= Straža Party =

Slovene political party

Straža Party – Catholic National Party Stranka Straža – Katoliška narodna stranka
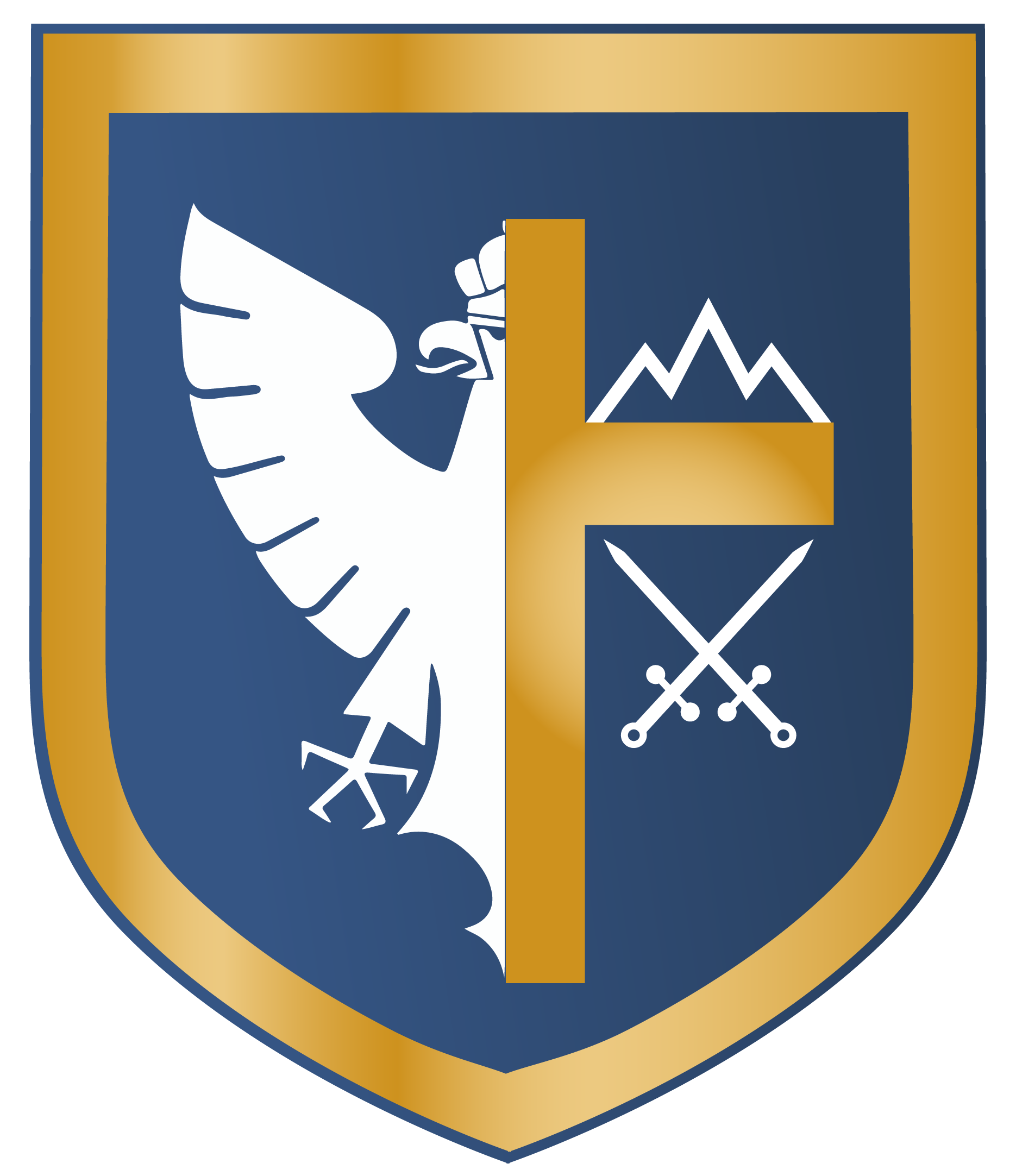
- Abbreviation: Straža; KNS
- President: Alen Koman
- Deputy President: Matija Vidmar
- General Secretary: Jernej Remic; Primož Kranjc
- Founded: 21 January 2026; 10 months ago
- Headquarters: Zgornje Jezersko 56, Jezersko
- Newspaper: Stražarski vestnik
- Membership (November 2026): ▲111
- Ideology: Traditionalist Catholicism Ethnic nationalism Anti-immigration Euroscepticism Sovereigntism Integralism
- Political position: Far-right
- Religion: Catholicism
- Colours: Gold; Blue; White
- Slogan: Bog. Družina. Domovina. ('God. Family. Homeland.')
- National Assembly: 0 / 90
- European Parliament: 0 / 9
- Mayors: 0 / 212
- Municipal council: 0 / 2,750

Party flag

Website
- strazar.si

Straža Party – Catholic National Party (Slovene: Stranka Straža – Katoliška narodna stranka, lit. 'The Guard'; KNS) is a nationalist political party in Slovenia led by Alen Koman. Founded in 2026, it is known for its hard Catholicism, Euroscepticism and opposition to immigration.

== History ==
=== Background ===
==== Origins (2020) ====
Alen Koman founded the platform Scutum Fidei in February 2020, which he described as a "lay apostolate for Catholic tradition in Slovenia." Through various podcasts on its YouTube channel, he presented and commented on topics related to Christianity.

==== Political engagement (2025–2026) ====
With the aim of political engagement, he joined Dejan Kaloh in January 2025 in the establishment of a new sovereigntist party and participated in drafting its program. At the end of February 2025, he announced that he would not continue the cooperation due to disagreements over the party's policy on abortion.

In June, the then MP Kaloh went on to establish the party Suvereni, while Koman soon after announced the formation of a new political party, Straža.

=== Founding ===
The founding meeting took place on 21 January 2026, when the party officially announced that it had collected the required 200 signatures of support.

The party did not contest the 2026 Slovenian parliamentary election.

== Ideology and positions ==
Straža describes itself as a Catholic nationalist and sovereigntist political party guided by the principles of "God, Family, Homeland". Its programme combines Catholic traditionalism, Slovenian nationalism, social conservatism, Euroscepticism and proposals for economic and administrative reform.

=== Catholicism and traditional values ===
Catholicism is a central component of the party's ideology. Straža advocates a greater role for Catholic moral values in public life and the preservation of Slovenia's Christian cultural heritage. The party supports the teaching of Catholic doctrine and the celebration of at least one Mass in Latin each month.

=== Housing ===
Straža advocates measures aimed at increasing housing affordability and reducing the number of vacant residential properties. Its proposals include a progressive tax on second and subsequent residential properties, taxation of vacant flats, restrictions on short-term tourist rentals such as Airbnb, and an expansion of public housing.

The party proposes that the state provide between 20 and 30 standardised architectural plans for family houses free of charge, allowing households to avoid the cost of commissioning individual designs. It also supports a ten-year moratorium on new residential construction in Ljubljana and Maribor.

Straža proposes establishing a public fund named "Slovenian Home", intended to reduce the number of vacant flats, which the party estimates at approximately 165,000. Housing provided through the fund would be prioritised for young Slovenian couples.

=== Public administration and bureaucracy ===
Straža advocates administrative reform, digitalisation and the decentralisation of government institutions. The party proposes creating a unified national digital platform inspired by Estonia's X-Road system, integrating public services and enabling greater interoperability between government databases. It also supports introducing artificial intelligence assistants across state digital platforms.

Its proposals include merging public agencies to reduce their number by 25%, reducing the number of government ministries to ten, and introducing a five-year moratorium on new public-sector recruitment.

The party advocates relocating selected ministries outside Ljubljana, including the Ministry of Agriculture to Ptuj, the Ministry of Culture to Nova Gorica, and the Ministry of the Environment to Velenje.

It also proposes a statutory 30-day deadline for issuing building permits.

=== Social policy and pensions ===
Straža advocates abolishing veterans' pensions and introducing pension incentives linked to motherhood. Under its proposal, mothers' pensions would increase according to the number of children they have: 5% for one child, 10% for two, 20% for three, 30% for four, and 50% for five children.

The party also supports a system of mandatory individual retirement savings, requiring employees to deposit between 5% and 10% of their wages into personal pension accounts.

Straža opposes abortion and divorce and advocates traditional family structures. It supports introducing a "family wage" intended to enable mothers to remain at home and raise children.

The party additionally proposes tax incentives for Slovenian citizens living abroad and university scholarships intended to encourage their return to Slovenia.

=== Education ===
Straža supports homeschooling and proposes that parents choosing this form of education receive public funding equivalent to the amount allocated by the state for each pupil attending a public school.

The party advocates reintroducing Catholic religious instruction in schools and incorporating logic and rhetoric into the final two years of primary education and the first year of secondary education.

It also proposes publishing the results of Slovenia's National Assessment of Knowledge (NPZ), disaggregated by pupils' mother tongue and immigration status.

=== Energy policy ===
Straža supports the expansion of nuclear energy in Slovenia, including the construction of the second unit of the Krško Nuclear Power Plant (JEK2) and the development of small modular reactors.

=== Infrastructure and transport ===
Straža proposes a national motorway construction programme extending to 2040, with the objective of building approximately 200 kilometres of additional motorways.

The party also advocates establishing a publicly accessible digital platform containing information on the condition and quality of Slovenia's road network.

To improve transparency in infrastructure spending, it proposes comparing the costs of Slovenian road construction projects with similar projects in neighbouring countries. Where costs exceed comparable foreign projects by more than 30%, the Slovenian Infrastructure Agency (DRSI) would be required to provide a public explanation.

=== Immigration ===
Straža advocates a restrictive immigration policy prioritising highly skilled foreign workers. The party proposes introducing a points-based immigration system intended to select applicants according to their qualifications and anticipated economic contribution.

It supports restricting family reunification to spouses or partners and minor children, with eligibility arising after five years of residence.

For lower-skilled employment, particularly in construction and agriculture, the party advocates temporary or seasonal labour arrangements requiring foreign workers to return to their countries of origin after completing their employment.

Straža also proposes state-assisted voluntary return programmes for migrants whom it considers to impose a net fiscal burden, including the provision of one-way travel to their countries of origin.

The party advocates stricter naturalisation requirements, including 25 years of residence in Slovenia and Slovenian-language proficiency at the C2 level of the Common European Framework of Reference for Languages.

It additionally proposes requiring foreign drivers to demonstrate their driving competence under Slovenian standards.

=== Economic policy ===
Straža advocates a unified tax rate of 10%. Its economic programme includes proposals for privatisation and a reduction in state participation in commercial markets.

The party supports privatising or dissolving state-owned commercial enterprises operating in sectors where private businesses already compete, including telecommunications, food production and distribution.

=== Defence and NATO ===
Straža advocates compulsory military service for citizens at the age of 18 and supports strengthening Slovenia's national defence capabilities.

=== European Union and foreign policy ===
Straža holds Eurosceptic and sovereigntist positions, advocating greater national autonomy and opposing further transfers of political authority to European Union institutions.

The party has organised a meeting discussing arguments in favour of Slovenia's withdrawal from the European Union, commonly referred to as "Sloexit".

=== Healthcare ===
Straža opposes compulsory vaccination and advocates ending mandatory vaccination requirements. The party supports greater competition between public and private healthcare providers, allowing patients to choose publicly funded services from either sector. It advocates requiring medical graduates whose education was publicly funded to work in Slovenia's public healthcare system for ten years, increasing medical school enrollment by 50%, and improving transparency in hospital waiting times and treatment outcomes. Straža also proposes reforms to health insurance, including individual contributions for adult family members, stricter eligibility requirements for dependent coverage, and limiting publicly funded healthcare for foreign workers and asylum seekers primarily to emergency medical services.

=== Non-governmental organisations ===
Straža proposes abolishing non-governmental organisations under the existing institutional framework while establishing a separate legal category for voluntary emergency and rescue organisations, including volunteer fire brigades and helicopter rescue services.

=== Law and order ===
Straža advocates tougher criminal penalties for sexual offences against children and stronger border security.

The party also proposes arrangements under which foreign nationals convicted of criminal offences in Slovenia would serve their sentences in prisons in their countries of origin.

== Controversies ==
In June 2026, members of Stranka Straža attended the Ljubljana Pride parade. The party subsequently published a video juxtaposing photographs of its members at the event with archival footage of Leon Rupnik and collaborationist formations from the Second World War. The party had described its presence at the parade as "exorcising demons" ("izganjanje demonov"). The Na radarju coalition of Slovenian LGBTIQ+ organisations condemned the publication, arguing that it associated the LGBTIQ+ community with demons and contributed to its stigmatisation.

Historian Božo Repe has associated Stranka Straža with militant pre-war and wartime clerical-fascist organisations and the Slovene Home Guard associated with Leon Rupnik.

== Organisation ==
The party is led by a president. Since its foundation, this position has been held by Alen Koman.

Leader		Took office	Left office	Tenure
1	Alen Koman (1988–)	21 January 2026	Incumbent	305 days

=== Membership ===
Membership numbers
2026	111

== Electoral results ==
=== Parliamentary elections ===
Although planning to partake in the 2026 Slovenian parliamentary election they later withdrew after failing to collect the needed signatures.

=== President ===
Election	Candidate	First round result			Second round result		
Election	Candidate	Votes	%	Result	Votes	%	Result
2027	Alen Koman	was not held yet					

=== European Parliament ===
Straža has not participated in any European Parliament election, due to them being founded in 2026 and last being held in 2024.

=== Local elections ===
Straža announced Aleš Ernecl, philosopher and a withdrawn candidate in 2022 Slovenian presidential election as their candidate in the 2026 Maribor mayoral election, while also running for councils in Maribor, Ljubljana, Kočevje, Novo mesto and Sevnica.

=== Local elections ===
Election	Leader	Mayors	Councillors	Parishes
2026	Alen Koman	0 / 212	0 / 2,750	0 / 7,726

== See also ==
- Politics of Slovenia
- List of political parties in Slovenia
