= George Nikolic =

Italian urologist (1852 – 1925)

George Nikolić also spelled Giorgio Nicolich (1852 – 11 February 1925) was an Austrian and Italian surgeon and urologist, renowned as a European pioneer in the treatments of tuberculosis and kidneys. He is remembered as the father of urology in Trieste.

== Biography ==
George Nikolić was the son of Serbian immigrants who settled first in Trieste and then in Venice, Austrian Empire, where George was born. He studied medicine at the University of Padua where he earned his medical license in 1875 like his name-sake uncle a generation before him. He was a trainee of the urologist Tito Vanzetti in Padua. He specialized at Graz and in Vienna under Theodor Billroth, the founding father of abdominal surgery. Afterwards, he got a job at the hospital in Trieste and in 1886 he became the primarius of the 7th ward, where patients with sexual and chronic diseases were treated. From 1889 to 1896 he was the president of the hospital medical council, and in 1889 he founded a fund to help poor convalescents.

In 1897, Dr. Nikolić succeeded in obtaining permission to receive urogenital surgery in his hospital ward, and thus de facto became the founder of the first urology ward in the Austro-Hungarian Empire, and consequently in Italy.

In 1907, he was appointed president of the Trieste Medical Society, whose uncle Djordje Nikolić (1818–1886) was one of the founders, a position he would hold for the rest of his life. He attended the XVIIth International Congress of Medicine in London in 1913. While there he stayed at the Curzon Hotel at Kensington and Chelsea.

In 1919, he established the first Department of Urology in Italy at the Faculty of Medicine in Florence, and two years later, in 1921, he founded the first Italian Society of Urologists and was its first president. In 1923, by a special decree of the mayor of Trieste, he remained a lifelong ad honorem primary care physician of the City General Hospital, although at that time he was already over seventy years of age with forty years of service.

In 1924, he founded the Italian Archives of Urology, and the following year, shortly before his death, he was appointed an honorary member of the Society of Urologists in Berlin and of the Belgium Society and member of the Academy of medicine of Constantinople. For a long time he was President of the Italian Society of Urology.

He also attended the Parisian School of Urology with Guyon, and Albarran. He was a student of the famous physicians Vanzetti, Billroth and Guyon.

He introduced the world's first surgical intervention in the treatment of tuberculosis of the kidneys and was one of the first doctors in Europe to perform prostatectomy. His merits for science and society include the modification of the hitherto extremely painful variant of Maisonneuve's urethrotome.

He was awarded the French Legion of Honor and the Italian Order of the Crown of Italy. He was made member of several medical and scientific academies and societies throughout Europe, Russia, Asia Minor, United Kingdom and the Western Hemisphere.

Dr. Nikolić was a great Italian patriot and, at the very beginning of the First World War, he pledged all his property as a guarantee of a war loan to Italy, and after the fall of Austria-Hungary, he became a member of the Trieste Health Committee.

He died in Trieste on 11 February 1925.

== Legacy ==
There is a street in Trieste named after him.

== Works ==
He contributed to the treatment of numerous diseases and on procedural operating cases:

- Nephrolithiasis
- Scleroderma
- Abcès des corps caverneux de la verge
- Die Hamleiterdarmanastomose
- Prolemi terapeutici attuali nei tumori della vescica
- coauthored the "Manual of Urology", a seminal work at the time.
- co-authored with Andrea Vesnaver and Umberto Ademollo, Tre deari della Grande Guerra

== See also ==
- Serbs in Italy
- Saint Spyridon Church, Trieste
- Dimitrije Frušić
- Marino Gopcevich
