= Dimitrije Frušić =

Serbian medical doctor and journalist (1790–1838)

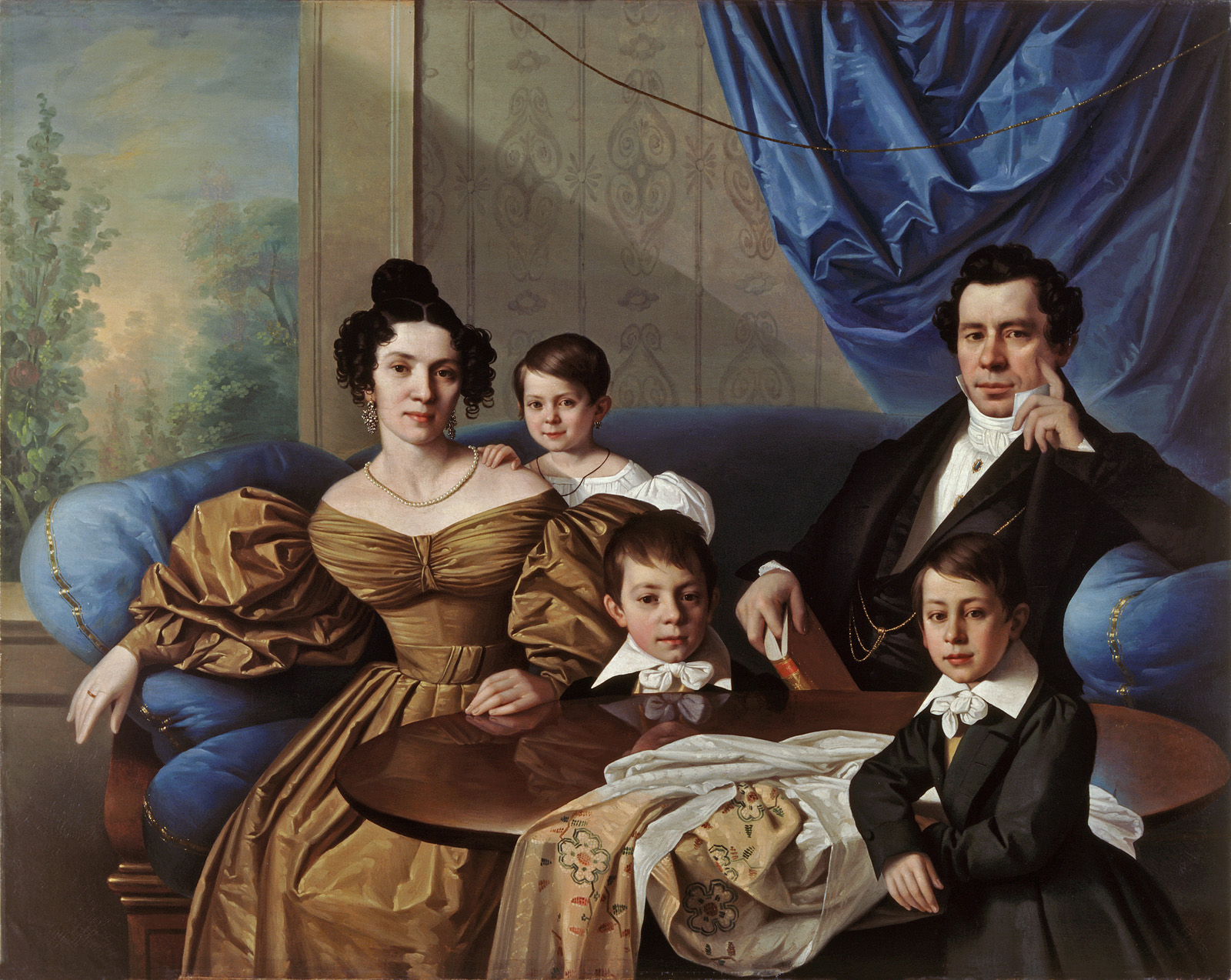
- Dr. Frušić z družino, circa 1832, by Giuseppe Tominz
- Born: 21 January 1790; Divoš, Habsburg monarchy
- Died: 13 October 1838 (aged 48); Trieste, Habsburg Monarch
- Occupations: medical doctor, journalist, and publisher

Dimitrije Frušić, also known in Trieste as Demetrio Frussich (21 January 1790 - 13 October 1838) was a prominent Serbian medical doctor, journalist, and publisher. He was the founder of the influential Novine Serbske (Serbian News) together with Dimitrije Davidović in Vienna during the Serbian Enlightenment. He was a well-respected physician in his day who played an important role in the construction of a new hospital -- Ospedale Maggiore -- in Trieste.

== Biography ==
Dimitrije Frušić was born in today's Vojvodina, in the village of Divoš, near Sremska Mitrovica in Fruška Gora, then part of the Habsburg monarchy. He originates from a noble family Frušić.

Dimitrije Frušić studied philosophy and medicine at the University of Vienna and became a doctor in 1815. At the university, he studied art and architecture as well. While still a medical student in Vienna, he and Dimitrije Davidović, launched the Novine Serbske on 17 August 1813. When the newspaper ran its course, Dimitrije Frušić, now a graduate from Medical School, left Vienna in 1819 for Trieste where he opened his practice and worked at a hospital there. Frušić designed plans for the construction of a new hospital, Ospedale Maggiore (later renamed Ospidali Riuniti di Trieste). He was also an active participant in the literary and political life of the city.

As a student in Vienna Frušić, who had an excellent command of the German language, served as an interpreter for Serbian envoy and Prota (priest) Matija Nenadović in the company of the Austrian emperor on two occasions. At that time he and Davidović also met Vuk Karadžić and Jernej Kopitar who were working on the language reform. In the modest premises of his printing shop, Frušić opened a Reading Room equipped with Serbian books and Novine Serbske that also became a meeting place for intellectuals.

Always impressed with Vuk Karadžić's work, Frušić raised money for the scholar with the help of such friends as Joakim Vujić, Atanasije Stojković, Pavle Solarić, and the wealthy Teodoroviches of Trieste. He supported Vuk's reforms along with many other intellectuals in Trieste and elsewhere at the time.

Dimitrije Frušić died in Trieste where he was buried in a Serbian cemetery.

== Family life ==
He was married to Jovanka, daughter of Lazar and Ana Lukić of Dubrovnik. They had three children: Čedomilj (born 6 February 1826; d. 1835), Dušan (born March 7, 1827; d. 1896) and Milica (born 17 July 1831; d. 1911).

== Legacy ==
A library is named after him in Divoš, his hometown.

== See also ==
- Serbs in Italy
- George Nikolic
- Vuk Karadžić
- Dimitrije Davidović
- Stefan von Novaković
- Jovo Kurtović
- Darinka, Princess of Montenegro
- Spiridione Gopcevich
