= Spiridon Gopčević =

Serbian astronomer and writer (1855–1928)

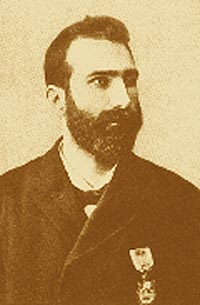
Spiridon Gopčević

Spiridon Gopčević (Serbian Cyrillic: Спиридон Гопчевић; 9 July 1855 – 1928), also known under the pseudonym Leo Brenner, was a Serbian-Austrian amateur astronomer, journalist, writer and historian born in Trieste. His works on the modern history of Serbia and the Balkans were written from a nationalist point-of-view.

== Life ==
Gopčević was born on 9 July 1855 in Trieste. He originated from the village of Podi near Herceg Novi, in Boka Kotorska (modern-day Montenegro), then a part of the Austrian Empire. Gopčević received his education in Vienna, after which he began his journalistic and writing career. He later became part of Serbian foreign service and worked as a diplomatic attaché in Berlin from 1886 to 1887 and Vienna from 1887 to 1890. He returned to his family's estate in Trieste in 1891, where he worked as a journalist for German-language newspapers.

Gopčević's journalistic career ended in 1893 when he was imprisoned for his anti-regime articles. As a self-educated man in astronomy, he practiced the field and published works in it under the pseudonym Leo Brenner. In 1894, he founded an observatory called "Manora" in the town of what is now called Mali Lošinj in present-day Croatia. At this observatory, Gopčević used the 17.5 cm refractor telescope to make observations of planets. Gopčević published observational reports and gained respect among lunar and planetary specialists, such as Philipp Fauth and Percival Lowell. Per academics Ronald Stoyan and Klaus-Peter Schroeder, his reports were extremely detailed and often fictional.

He initially published works in Journal of the British Astronomical Association and The English Mechanic and World of Science. However, when he began to produce results that seemed unrealistic to his contemporaries, such as claiming in the 1890s that the rotation time of Venus is 23 hours, 57 minutes and 36.2396 seconds, Mercury - 33.25 hours, Uranus - 8 hours and 17 minutes, his works were no longer accepted. After his observations received criticism, he made ad hominem attacks against his critics, with targets being French astronomer Camille Flammarion and his assistant Eugène Antoniadi. Gopčević even had a falling out with Lowell, and habitually abused the staff and equipment of the Vienna Observatory. His reputation was ruined due to this conduct. In 1898, the editor of the Astronomische Nachrichten, Heinrich Kreutz, refused to accept his submissions. Gopčević coped with this rejection by establishing his own monthly journal, Astronomische Rundschau (which he published and edited from 1899 to 1909), which served as a platform for self-promotion and allowed him to carry out personal vendettas against astronomers who disagreed with him. It occasionally featured fake endorsements of his work by luminaries. Many of the articles written by popular figures like Simon Newcomb, Thomas See, and Edward Barnard were copied from other journals. In 1902, he published the first observing guide of the deep-sky in German. His books on observational astronomy, Spaziergaenge durch das Himmelszelt (1898) and Beobachtungs-Objecte fuer Amateur-Astronomen (1902), had positive reception. According to astronomer Thomas Hockey, "Brenner published drawings of Jupiter that were well accepted", and "After being banned from many journals, Brenner published his own, which included invented endorsements from respected astronomers. Such trickery suggests his erroneous discoveries were not simply innocent errors but deceptions." Per Austrian historian Martin Stangl, he had "a nearly pathological craving for fame and recognition" in combination with an "overestimation of the possible."

He became a strong supporter of the Austro-Hungarian monarchy. In 1909, he revealed his identity to the readers of his journal and announced that he would stop publishing the journal, sell his observatory and library, and leave astronomy. By then, his credibility was lost to almost all professional astronomers and he left the field. Philipp Fauth, who kept respecting him, wrote in his letters that Gopčević committed suicide, but the year and circumstances of his death are disputed. He possibly died in 1928 in Berlin.

The crater Brenner on the Moon was named after his pseudonym. A new observatory was built on Mali Lošinj in 1993, and was named "Leo Brenner".

== Views ==
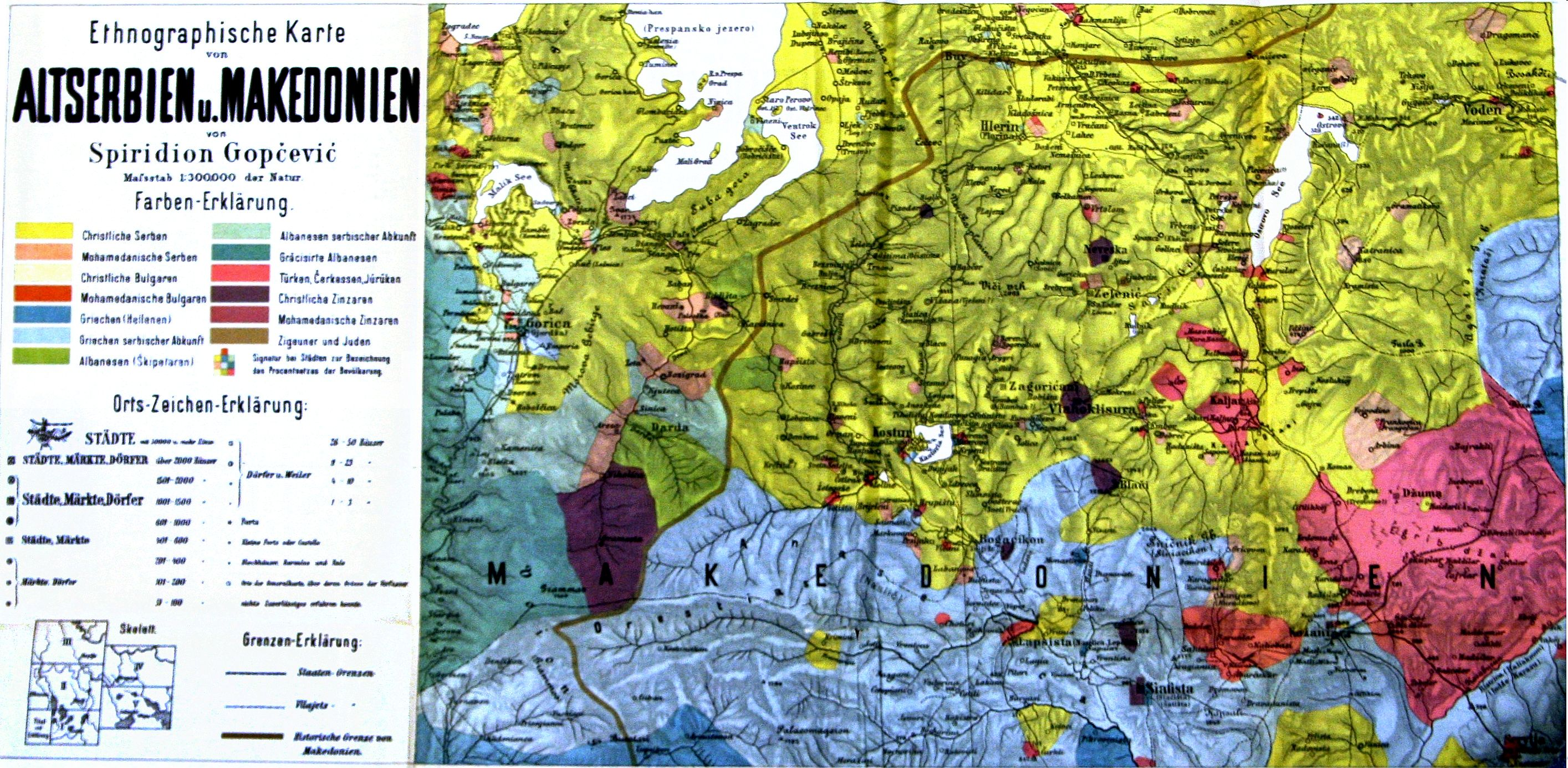
Pro-Serbian map of Macedonia by Spiridon Gopčević

Politically, Gopčević promoted the national interests and policy of Kingdom of Serbia. In 1889, Gopčević published a Serbian nationalist book titled Macedonia and Old Serbia (German: Makedonien und Alt Serbien) for German-language readers, which concerned Kosovo and Macedonia, and contained a pro-Serbian ethnographic map of Macedonia. The book was published in Serbian in Belgrade in 1890. It received publicity in Serbia and all German-speaking countries. His map also received publicity in Western countries and despite being regarded as a propagandistic work, his claim led to an impetus in demographic reclassifications. Gopčević's study was the first significant one from a Serbian scholar with a claim about Macedonian Slavs.

Gopčević's biographer argues that he did not actually go to Kosovo and the study is not based on authentic experiences. Within scholarship, Gopčević's study has been noted for its plagiarisms, manipulations and misrepresentations, especially overstressing the Serbian character of Macedonia. Gopčević's views on Serbian and Albanian populations in Kosovo and also the issue of the Arnautaš theory or Albanians of alleged Serbian (descent) have only been partially examined by some authors. In the book, Gopčević wrote that the Albanians of upper Reka are "albanicised Slavs". He claimed that most of the South Slavs were actually Serbs and that their languages were dialects of the Serbian language. Another claim made was that the population of Kosovo was originally almost entirely of Serbian origin and was partially Islamized. Gopčević split the non-Serb population of Kosovo into two groups: Albanians of Serbian origin and Islamized Serbs. Thus, Gopčević denied the existence of a long-established Albanian ethnicity in Kosovo, emphasizing its population as purely Serbian. Per him, the majority of Kosovo's population consisted of Serbian Christians. Gopčević did not include sources for his demographic data and it was an arbitrary assessment because Ottoman censuses were based on religion and not ethnicity. His book is seen as a work that opened the path for Serbian territorial claims in the region.

In his 1951 book Maps and Politics: A Review of the Ethnographic Cartography of Macedonia, British academic Henry Robert Wilkinson wrote about Gopčević's book: "It is a firm axiom of the propagandist, however, that an initial failure may be turned into an ultimate success by the simple process of reiteration. Gopčević at least provided the Serbs with their initial failure." According to academics Thomas A. Dobbins and William Sheehan, he championed conflicting causes, such as Serbian nationalism, Albanian independence, and a defense of the Hapsburg monarchy.

== Works ==
- Montenegro und die Montenegriner, 1877
- Oberalbanien und seine Liga, 1881
- Bulgarien und Ostrumelien, 1886
- Kriegsgeschichtliche Studien, 2 Bände, 1887
- Makedonien und Alt-Serbien (in German). Wien: L.W. Seidel. 1889. OCLC 10448229.
- (als Leo Brenner): Beobachtungs-Objekte für Amateur-Astronomen, 1902
- USA. Aus dem Dollarlande; Sitten, Zustände und Einrichtungen der Vereinigten Staaten, 1913
- Das Fürstentum Albanien, seine Vergangenheit, ethnographischen Verhältnisse, politische Lage und Aussichten für die Zukunft, 1914
- Geschichte von Montenegro und Albanien, 1914
- Aus dem Lande der unbegrenzten Heuchelei. Englische Zustände, 1915
- Rußland und Serbien von 1804-1915. Nach Urkunden der Geheimarchive von St. Petersburg und Paris und des Wiener Archivs, 1916
- Amerikas Rolle im Weltkriege, 1917
- Die Wahrheit über Jesus nach den ausgegrabenen Aufzeichnungen seines Jugendfreundes, 1920
- Kulturgeschichtliche Studien, 1920
- Österreichs Untergang : die Folge von Franz Josefs Mißregierung, 1920
- Serbokroatisches Gesprächsbuch verbunden mit kurzer Sprachlehre und Wörterverzeichnis, 1920

== See also ==
- Serbs in Italy
- Triestine Serbs
- Arthur Evans
- Marino Gopcevich
- Spiridione Gopcevich

== Sources ==
- Promitzer, Christian (2015). "Austria and the Balkans: Exploring the role of travelogues in the construction of an area". In Kaser, Karl (ed.). Southeast European Studies in a Globalizing World. Münster: Lit Verlag. pp. 189–206. ISBN 9781443842839.
