= Marino Gopcevich =

Italian physician (1899–1965)

Marino Gopcevich (17 February 1899 – 1965) was an Italian physician who founded the neurological division in the General Hospital of Trieste.

== Biography ==
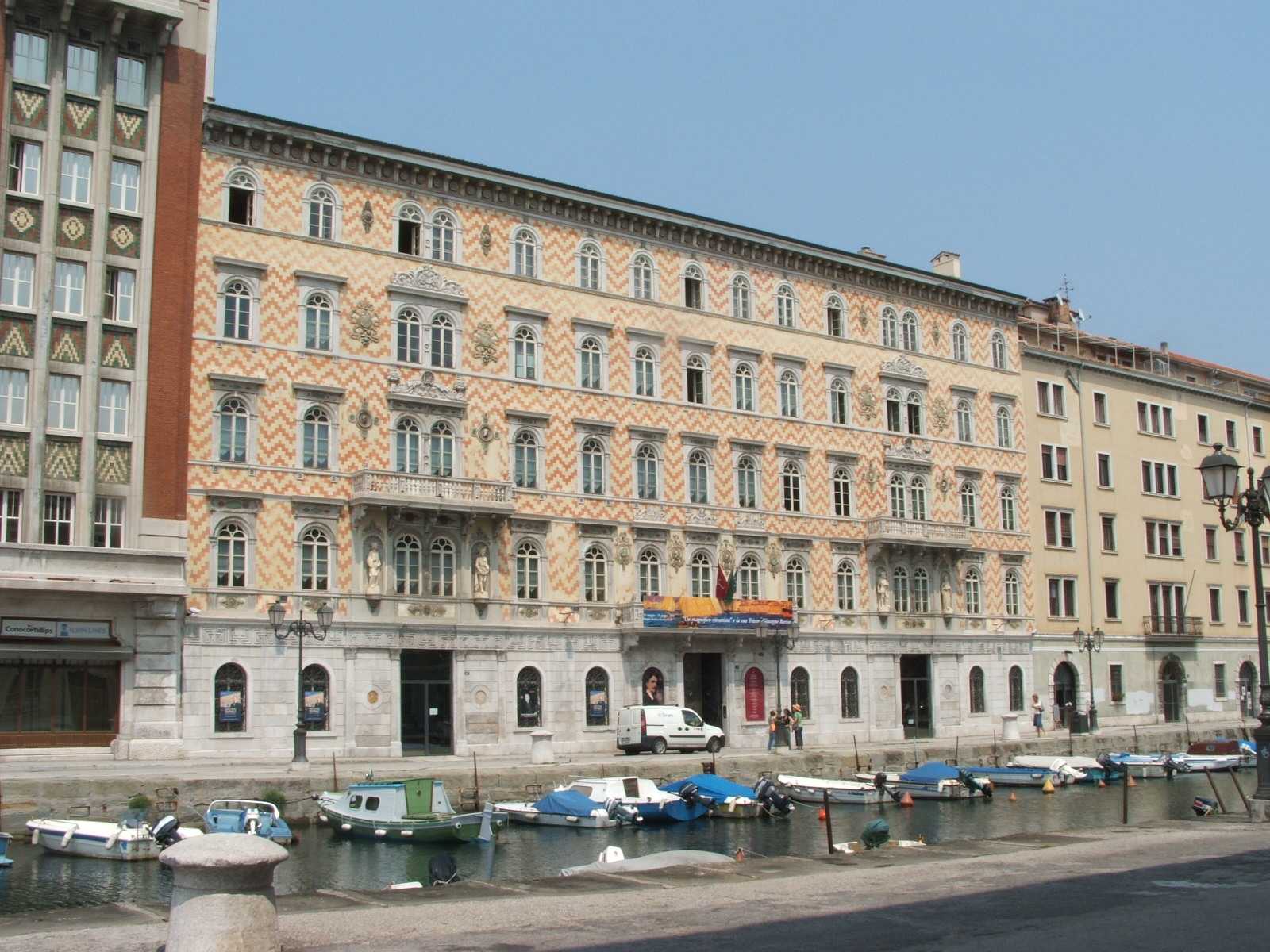
Palazzo Gopcevich in Canal Grande, Trieste, Italy

Marino Gopcevich, nephew of Spiridione Gopcevich, was born on 17 February 1899 in Trieste, where his family moved from Montenegro to Friuli-Venezia Giulia in 1805. Even in earlier generations, the Gopchevich family intermarried with the House of Petrović-Njegoš.

He was also part of a long line of Triestine Serbs, who were physicians going back to Dimitrije Frušić and the Nicolich family of doctors, namely George Nikolic, and his namesake uncle. Gopcevich graduated from the School of Medicine at the University of Padua, then went for post-graduate studies to France where he graduated in Paris. In Paris he worked as a chef de clinique (Senior house officer or resident physician) at the Pitié-Salpêtrière Hospital from 1925 to 1930. In the 1930s, he was assistant of neurology at the General Hospital in Padua.

Gopcevich worked at the special school for phrenasthenia in Villa Giulia. He founded the department of Neurology at the Regina Elena Hospital in Trieste (also known as Ospedale Maggiore part of Ospedali Riuniti di Trieste) in 1945. His research also focused on the treatment of epilepsy.

On 4 July 1964, he received the Order of Merit of the Italian Republic. He died the following year in Trieste. He was first cousin of Spiridon Gopčević, a prominent astronomer and historian, also from Trieste.

== Works ==
- Marino Gopcevich, Contribution à l'étude clinique de la statique et l'hypotonie musculaire, 1930.
- Co-authored with C. Bevilacqua, Breve storia dell'assistenza neurologica a Trieste, Lantemino, 1988.
- Co-authored with Flavio Tuvo, Les proplèmes de l'epilepsie en droit pénal (A propos du procès de Dallas).
- Co-authored with Vittorio, Su di una varietá rara di sindrome eccitomotoria co postencefalitica (Über eine seltenc Varietät des excitomotorischen Syndroms bei Postencephalitikern).
- Co-authored with Nestore Morandini, La cisternografia e l'esame del liquor C. R. come „ testa di guarigione nella meningite TBC (Die Cisternographie und die Liquoruntersuchung als Heilungstest bei der Meningitis tuberculosa).

== See also ==
- Dimitrije Frušić
