= Serbs in Switzerland =

Serben in der Schweiz Serbes en Suisse Срби у Швајцарској Srbi u Švajcarskoj

Total population
- 56,743 Serbian citizens (2024) ~120,000 of Serb ancestry (est.)

Regions with significant populations
- Canton of Zurich, Canton of Bern, Basel-Stadt

Languages
- Swiss German and Serbian

Religion
- Eastern Orthodoxy (Serbian Orthodox Church)

Related ethnic groups
- Serbs in Austria, Serbs in Germany

Serbs in Switzerland are Swiss citizens of ethnic Serb descent and/or Serbia-born persons living in Switzerland. According to official data from 2024, there were 56,743 Serbian citizens in the Switzerland, while estimated number of people of Serb ethnic descent (including Swiss citizens with full or partial Serb ethnic descent) stands at around 120,000.

== History ==
The first notable Serbian presence in Switzerland dates to the late-19th century, primarily for educational purposes. Zurich emerged as a hub for young Serbs studying at the University of Zurich, drawn by its reputation as a center for science and humanities. From 1863 to 1914, about 160 Serbian students enrolled there, including women such as physicist Mileva Marić, who studied in Zurich and later became Albert Einstein's wife; spending much of her life in Switzerland.

The largest wave began in the 1960s, fueled by Switzerland's economic boom and labor shortages. A 1965 bilateral agreement between Bern and Belgrade enabled the recruitment of Yugoslav guest workers (Gastarbeiter), many from rural Serbian areas facing unemployment under Yugoslavia's socialist economy. These migrants, often engineers, doctors, dentists, and agricultural laborers, arrived via collective contracts.

By the 1970s, immigration surged amid Switzerland's high demand for foreign labor, tripling the Yugoslav population to around 172,000 by 1990 (including Serbs, who formed a significant portion). This era marked the rise of the Gastarbeiter phenomenon, with many intending temporary stays but eventually settling due to family reunification policies.

The breakup of Yugoslavia triggered the most dramatic wave, with Switzerland granting asylum to tens of thousands fleeing ethnic violence in Bosnia and Herzegovina and Kosovo.

Family reunions sustained growth into the 2000s, despite Switzerland's 1991 "Three Circles" model restricting non-EU immigration (placing Yugoslavia in the restrictive third circle).

The 2011 creation of the Serbian Orthodox Eparchy of Austria and Switzerland strengthened cultural ties, supporting churches and community events. Today, migration continues via family ties, and skilled work, though economic factors like brain drain from Serbia persist.

== Culture ==
The Katarina Jovanović Library (Srpska biblioteka u Cirihu - Biblioteka Katarina Jovanović) is a cultural institution serving the Serb diaspora in Switzerland. Established in 1952 as a Serbian community library, it honors the legacy of Katarina Jovanović, a Serbian intellectual and humanitarian who spent much of her life in exile in Zurich. With collection of over 12,000 volumes, the library preserves Serbian heritage and is part of the broader Serbian cultural network in Switzerland.

== Notable people ==
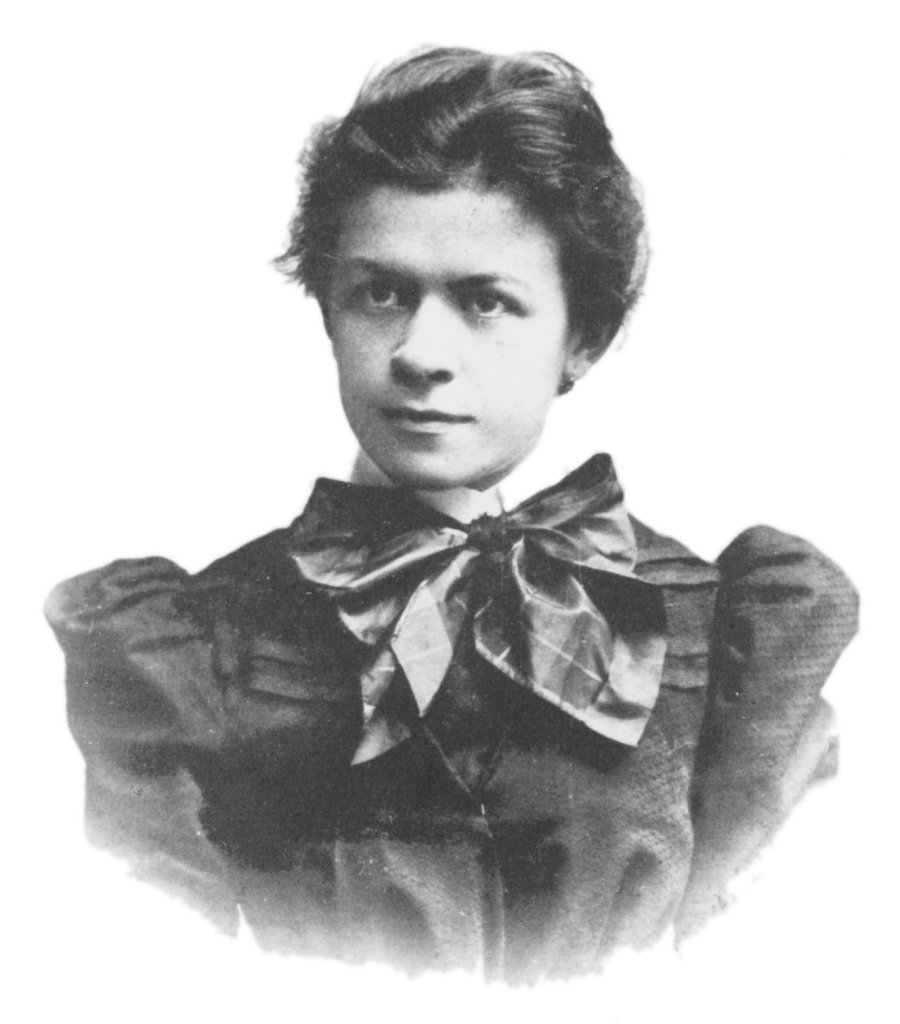
Mileva Marić

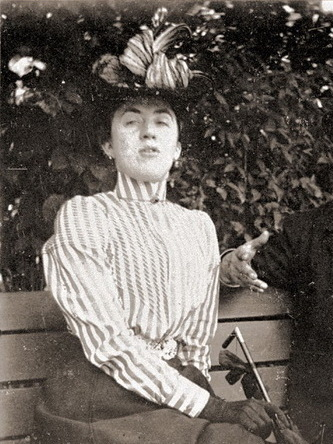
Katarina Jovanović

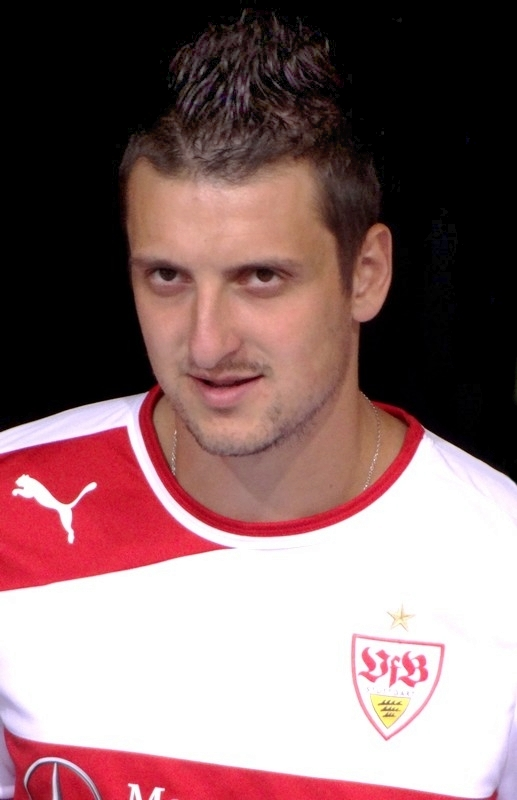
Zdravko Kuzmanović

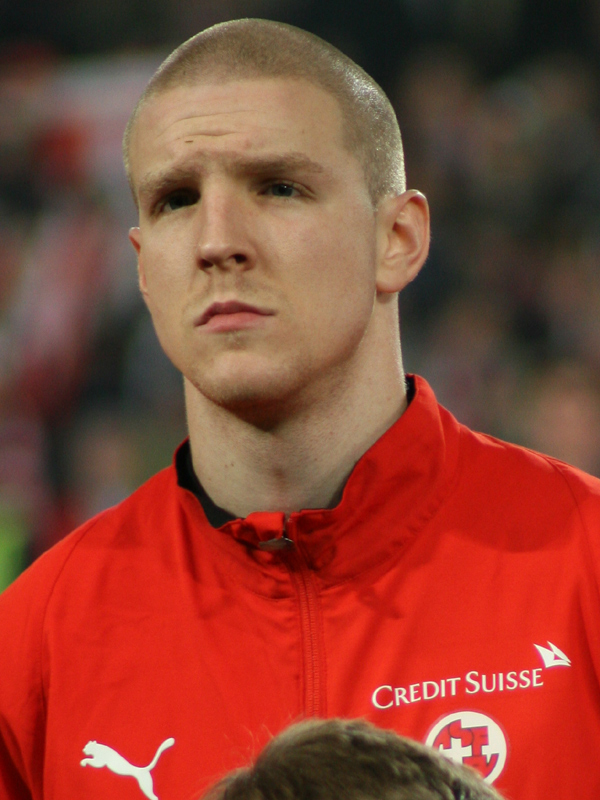
Philippe Senderos

- Mileva Marić – scientist
- Katarina Jovanović – philosopher, journalist
- Zdravko Kuzmanović – football player
- Philippe Senderos – football player, maternal Serb descent

== See also ==
- Immigration to Switzerland
- Serb diaspora
- Serbia–Switzerland relations
- Serbian Orthodox Eparchy of Switzerland
