= Spiridione Gopcevich =

Serbian businessman

Spiridon Gopčević Спиридон Гопчевић
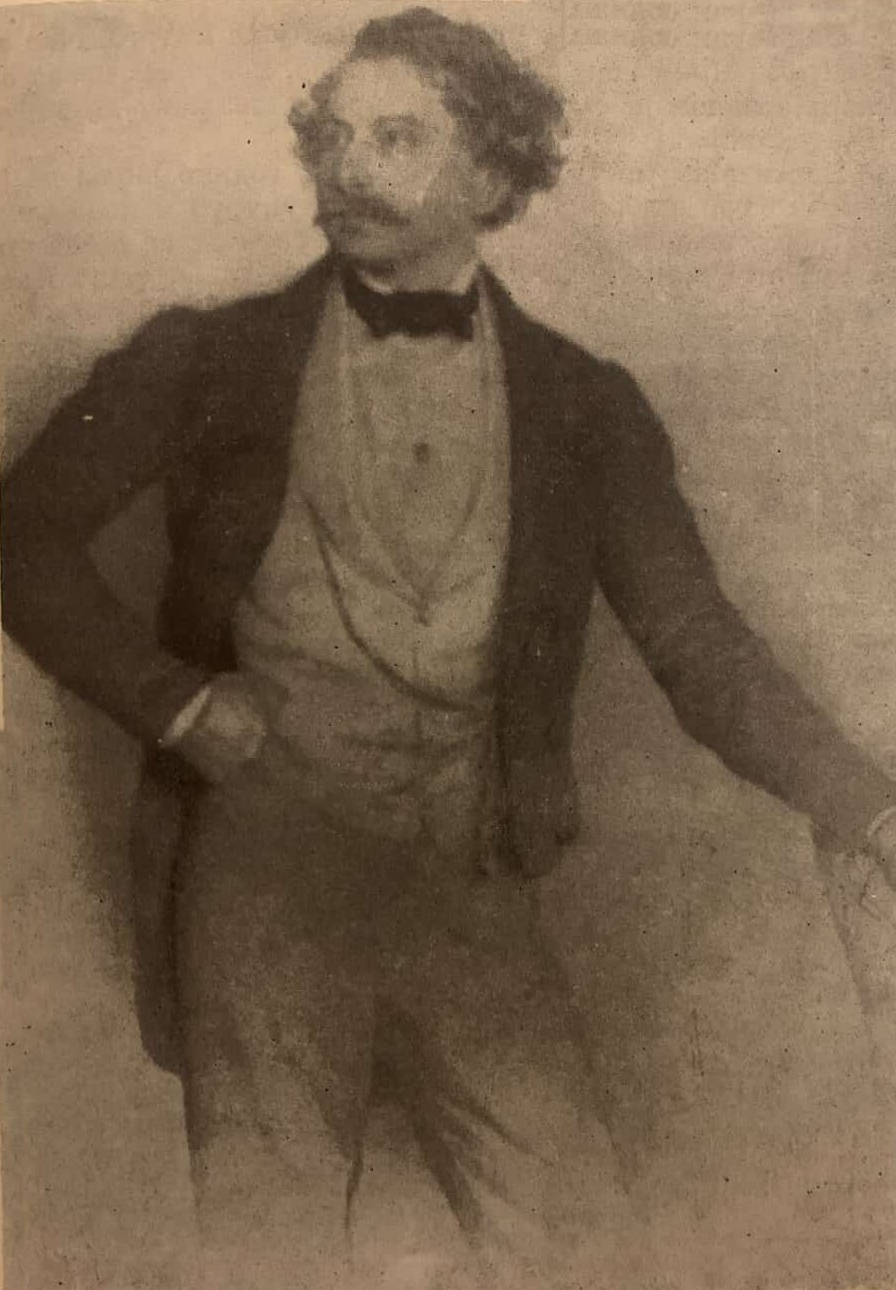
- Portrait of Gopcevich by August Prinzhofer (1850)
- Born: 1815; Trieste, Austrian Empire
- Died: 1861 (aged 45–46); Trieste, Austrian Empire
- Occupations: businessman, shipowner and benefactor

Spiridione Gopcevich (Serbian: Spiridon Gopčević, Cyrillic: Спиридон Гопчевић, 1815–1861) was a shipowner from Trieste, one of the richest and most influential Triestine Serbs.

== Biography ==
Gopchevich was of Serbian origin. His father, Christopher Gopcevich (Hristifor Gopcevic), born in 1765, originated from the village of Podi near Herceg Novi (modern Montenegro). He was also a shipowner who moved from Montenegro with three brigadiers to Trieste in 1805, attracted by the city's explosive growth and earning potential. Spiridone's mother was Sofia Kvekić (Herceg Novi 1792 - Trieste 1854) younger sister of Trieste shipping magnate Marko Kvekić (1786–1855), father of Darinka, Princess of Montenegro. Even in earlier generations, the Gopchevich family intermarried with the House of Petrović-Njegoš.

Spiridione was sent to Vienna to be educated. He spoke fluently thirteen languages and become a great shipowner in Trieste, then Austrian Littoral (modern Italy) and in Odessa, Imperial Russia. After attending universities abroad, upon his return to Trieste, he proceeded to improve his father's trade business. When his father died in the middle of the 19th century, Spiridone Gopcevich owned 33 sailing ships and 2 steamships. which was about 10% of the tonnage of all merchant ships registered in Trieste, the main port of Austria. His ships sailed to the Russian Black Sea ports with which he did lucrative business.

His ships traded on the Mediterranean and the Black Sea routes, and he knew many dignitaries of the time, namely the British Prime Minister William Gladstone and the revolutionary Giuseppe Garibaldi whom he helped with the transport of military and humanitarian aid.

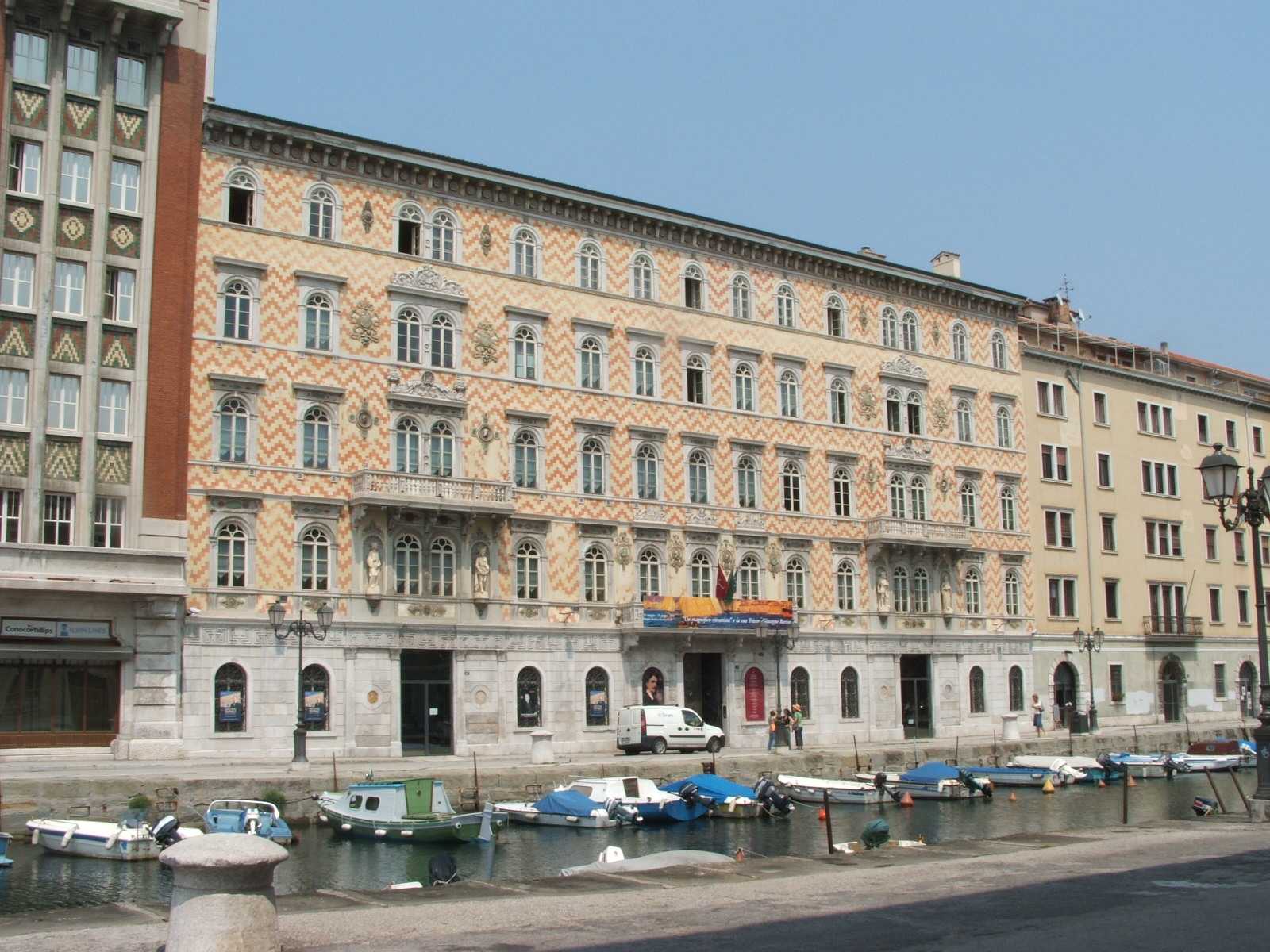
Palazzo Gopcevich in Canal Grande, Trieste, Italy

He then built the family palace (1850) on the Canal Grande in Trieste, partially copying the decoration on the façade of the Venetian Palazzo Ducale, designed by his architect Giovanni Andrea Berlam. Aware of his Serbian origin, Gopčević decorated the facade with four sculptures representing the heroes of the Battle of Kosovo (1389); Empress Milica, Tsar Lazar, Miloš Obilić and an anonymous Kosovo girl who helps the wounded. Today, the Palazzo Gopchevich still exists, bears his surname, but it now houses a museum.

At that time he was also a prominent member of the Illyrian community, as Serbian societies in Austria were called at the time, and was elected its president three times (1847, 1851 and 1854).

At the peak of his career, he was ruined by the business of importing Russian grain, for which he took out a large loan in Vienna. As the Crimean War was planned at that time, the grain remained blocked in the Black Sea ports, and he could not deliver it to Trieste even with great urgencies and letters to acquaintances - so he went bankrupt, and shortly afterwards killed himself in 1861.

Spiridone was an active member of the Serbian Orthodox community of Trieste. In addition, he was a benefactor who helped not only the institutions of Trieste but also those from his old, original homeland. In 1852 when a disaster hit the region, he helped the people of Sarajevo, and refugees from Herzegovina in general.

His son Spiridon Gopčević (1855–1928) was a journalist and world-famous astronomer.

Another illustrious descendant of the family was Marino Gopcevich (1899–1965), a neurologist, who in 1945 founded the Neurological division of the General Hospital in Trieste.

== See also ==
- Triestine Serbs
- Serbs in Italy
- Spiridon Gopčević
- Marino Gopcevich
