= Edoardo Bassini =

Italian surgeon

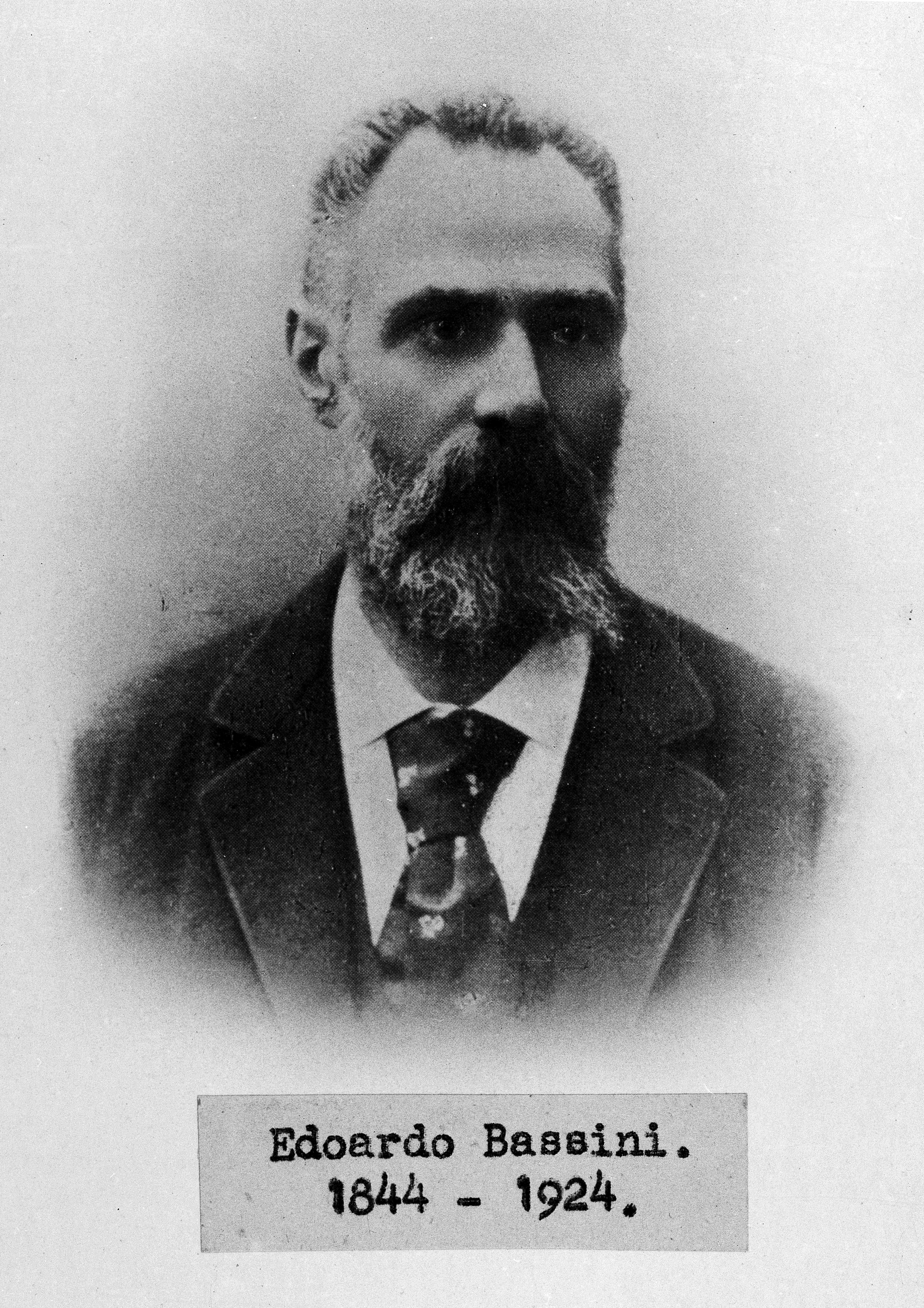
- Education: University of Pavia
- Occupation: Surgeon

Edoardo Bassini (April 14, 1844 – July 19, 1924) was an Italian surgeon born in Pavia.

== Early life and education ==
In 1866 he received his medical degree from the University of Pavia, and afterwards joined the Italian Unification movement as an infantry soldier under Giuseppe Garibaldi (1807–1882). In 1867 he was seriously wounded and taken prisoner.

== Surgical career ==
Following his release and recovery, he traveled throughout Europe, furthering his medical studies. He learned surgical procedures in Vienna under Theodor Billroth (1829–1894), in Berlin under Bernhard von Langenbeck (1810–1887), and in Munich with Johann Nepomuk von Nussbaum (1829–1890). He also visited London, where he met with Thomas Spencer Wells (1818–1897) and Joseph Lister (1827–1912).

Afterwards, he was in charge of the surgical department at the hospital La Spezia, and in 1878 became a lecturer in surgery at Parma. In 1882 he became head of surgical pathology at the University of Padua, where he later succeeded Tito Vanzetti (1809–1888) as the chair of clinical surgery (1888).

Bassini is remembered for his operative techniques involving inguinal hernia repair. In 1884 he introduced a surgical procedure that allowed for reconstruction of the inguinal canal and restoration of the patient's anatomy following removal of the hernial sac. It was a landmark operation because the posterior wall of the inguinal canal could be rebuilt and reinforced with only surgical sutures. It required no additional reinforcement or prosthesis. Despite the importance of the new surgical method, it didn't become known outside of Italy until 1890.

Bassini is credited for the advocation of antiseptic practices into Italian surgery. He introduced the usage of carbolic acid and eucalyptus to increase the chances of a patient's recovery and survival.

== Bassini's tomb in Pavia ==
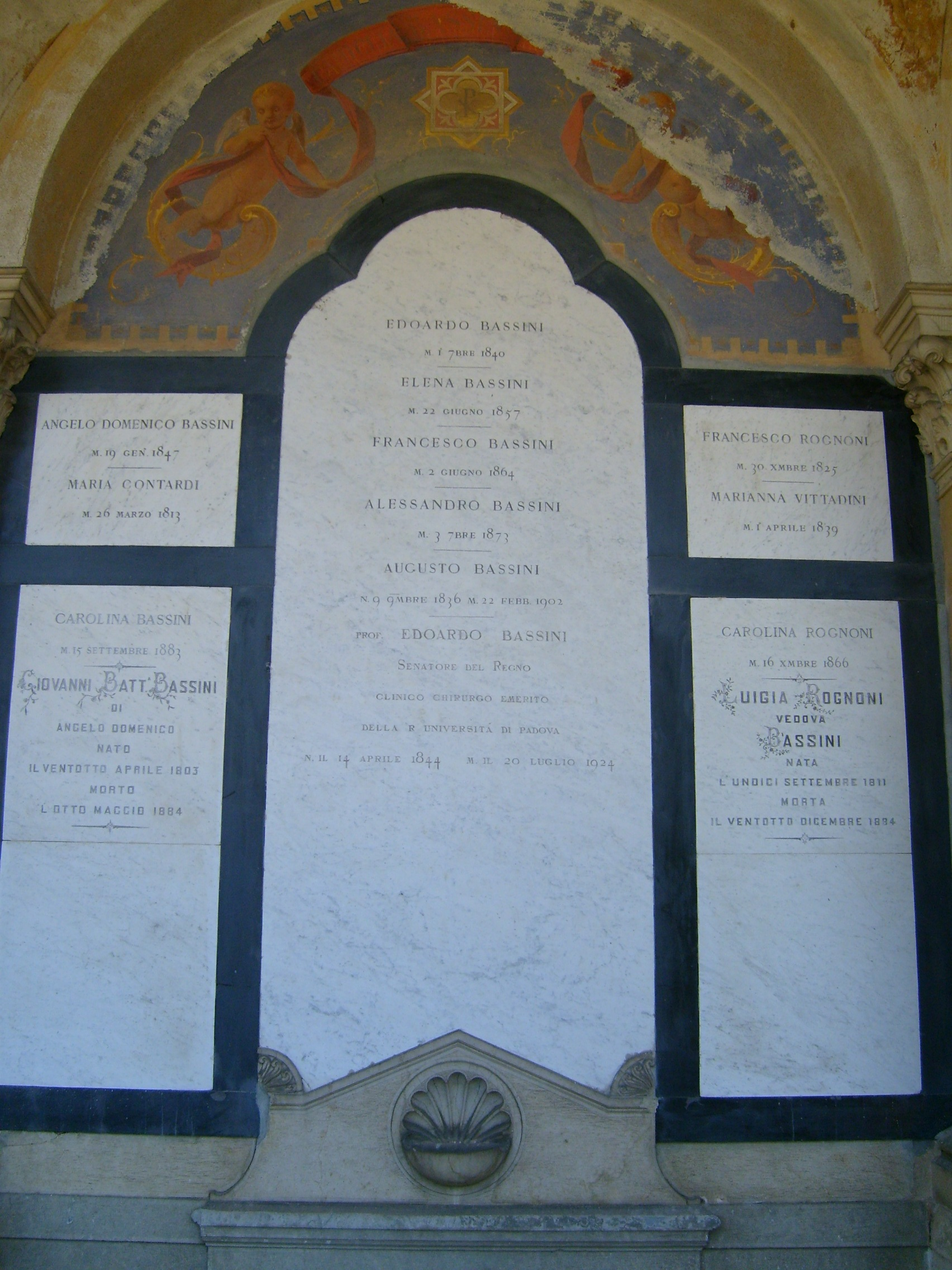
Bassini's tomb in the Monumental Cemetery in Pavia

Bassini was buried in his family tomb, in the "Cimitero Monumentale" of Pavia, as well as other important Italian medical scientists, such as Camillo Golgi, Bartolomeo Panizza and Adelchi Negri.

== Bibliography ==
- “Nuovo metodo operativo per la cura radicale dell'ernia inguinale”, Padova 1889.
