= Serbian Orthodox Eparchy of Switzerland =

Diocese of the Serbian Orthodox Church

Location
- Territory: Switzerland, Italy, Malta
- Headquarters: Zurich

Information
- Denomination: Eastern Orthodox
- Sui iuris church: Serbian Orthodox Church
- Established: 2024
- Cathedral: Holy Trinity Cathedral, Zurich
- Language: Church Slavonic, Serbian, Swiss German, Italian, French

Current leadership
- Bishop: Andrej Ćilerdžić

Map

Website
- Serbian Orthodox Eparchy of Switzerland

The Serbian Orthodox Eparchy of Switzerland (Serbian: Српска православна епархија швајцарска, romanized: Srpska pravoslavna eparhija švajcarska; German: Serbische Orthodoxe Diözese der Schweiz; Italian: Diocesi ortodossa serba della Svizzera; French: Diocèse orthodoxe serbe de Suisse) is a diocese (eparchy) of the Serbian Orthodox Church, covering Switzerland, Italy, and Malta.

== History ==
At the initiative of Serbian Patriarch German and with the blessing of Bishop Lavrentije of then-Western Europe, the Holy Trinity Parish in Bern was founded in 1969. The first priest in Switzerland was officially appointed as the then-graduate theologian, Father Draško Todorović. After a short time, in 1972, the headquarters of the original parish was moved from Bern to Zurich. A regular place of worship was maintained in Bern.

The single parish for Switzerland was divided in 1993 in three new parishes - Zurich, Bern, and St. Gallen. In 1994, a parish in Basel was also established, and by the end of the 1990s, parishes in Lausanne, Geneva, Lugano, and Lucerne.

== Structure ==
The Serbian Orthodox Eparchy of Switzerland comprises 8 eparchies. The episcopal see is located at the Holy Trinity Cathedral in Zurich.

== Gallery ==
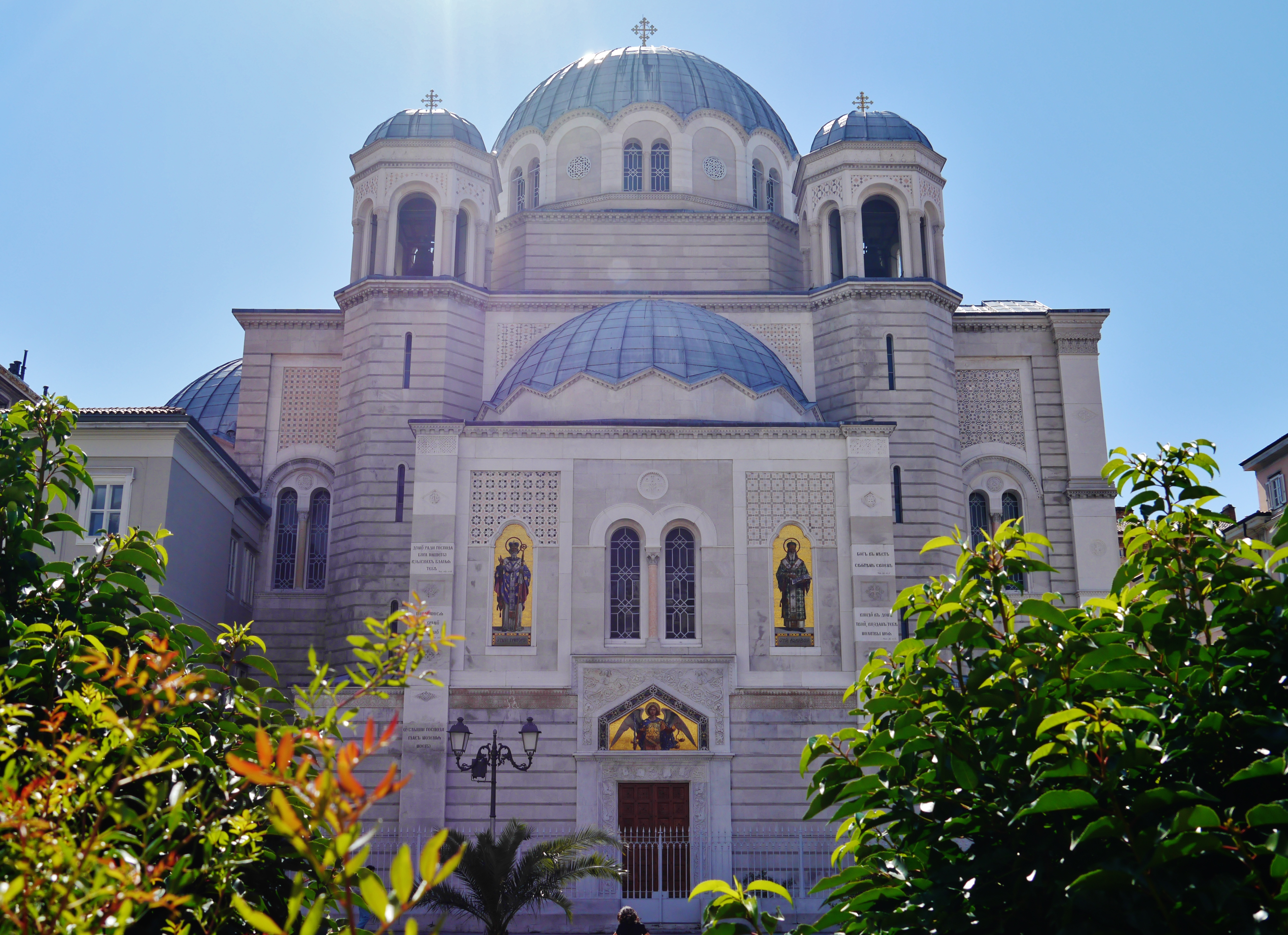
Saint Spyridon Church (Trieste)

== See also ==
- Assembly of Canonical Orthodox Bishops of Switzerland and Lichtenstein
- Assembly of Canonical Orthodox Bishops of Italy and Malta
- Eparchies and metropolitanates of the Serbian Orthodox Church
- Serbs in Switzerland
- Serbs in Italy
- Serbs in Malta
