= Andrej Ćilerdžić =

Bishop of the Serbian Orthodox Eparchy

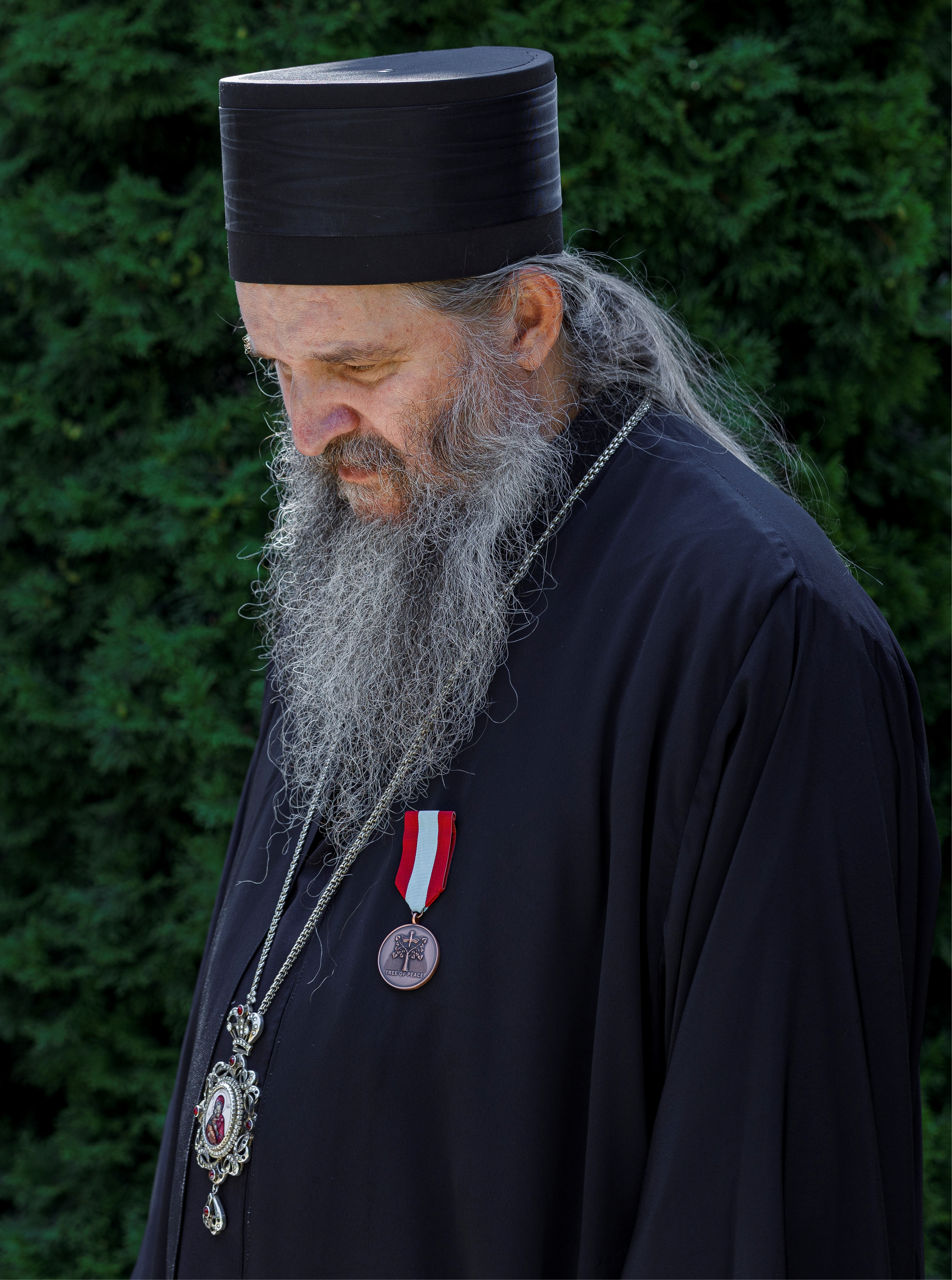
- Bishop Andrej in 2021
- Born: August 21, 1961 (age 64); Osnabrück, West Germany
- Church: Serbian Orthodox Church

Bishop Andrej (secular name Andreja Ćilerdžić; 21 August 1961) is a bishop of the Serbian Orthodox Church. He is the bishop of the Serbian Orthodox Eparchy of Switzerland.
