= Emilio Bisi =

Italian sculptor

Emilio Bisi (Milan, November 7, 1850 – Milan, February 19, 1920) was an Italian sculptor.

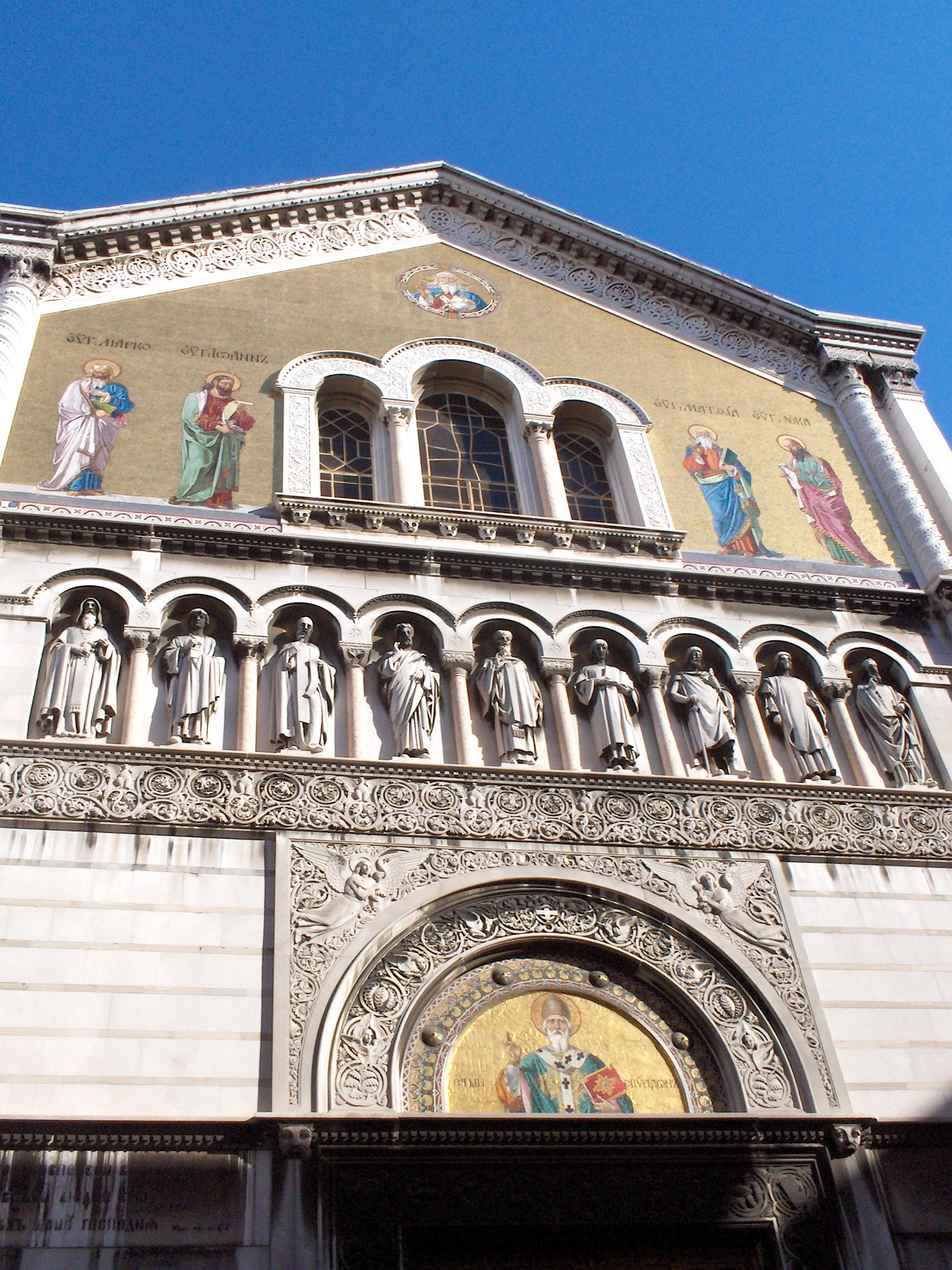
Statues by Emilio Bisi at St Spyridon in Trieste

His father was Luigi Bisi, a painter and president of the Brera Academy in Milan from 1880 till his death in 1886. Emilio donated a memorial statue of his father to the Academy. In 1883, Emilio's wife was a writer, Sofia Albini. He worked mostly on commissions for funeral monuments and churches. He completed the Santa Melania for the Duomo of Milan, two tombs for the brothers Maccia in the Monumental Cemetery of Milan, and a monument to Antonio Soneino Gussala, the friend of Pietro Giordani and donor of his manuscripts in the Mauricelliana Library. The latter monument with inscription by the poet Giosuè Carducci. He also completed nine larger than life figures for the facade of the Serbian church of St Spyridon in Trieste. He completed a monument to Covacevich for the Serbian cemetery of Trieste and Monument to Count Carlo Barbiani di Belgioioso, who had served as president of the Milan Academy before his father.
