= Jovo Kurtović =

Serbian shipping magnate (1718–1809)

Jovan "Jovo" Kurtović and/or Giovanni Curtovich (1718 – 12 August 1809) was a Serbian shipping magnate in the eighteenth century who lived and worked in Trieste. He is credited, together with Johann I. de Verpoorten, a Flemish merchant, for establishing maritime trade with the United States of America, few months after the British surrender in October 1781. He became one of the most famous shipping tycoons of his time with several homes to his name and a fleet of merchant ships which sailed the seven seas.

== Biography ==
He was born in Začula, Ottoman Empire. Jovo Kurtović was already a prominent merchant in Trebinje, Hercegovina before he came to settle indefinitely in Trieste in 1737. Shortly after arriving in Trieste, he soon brought three of his brothers over from Hercegovina getting one to set up a branch of the business in western Turkey at Smyrna, the other in Amsterdam and the third one in Vienna, and Prague. They were in a way Jovo's trading ambassadors, through whom, for a short while, they gained a lot of wealth with more of their shops appearing around town and several residential buildings.

Giacomo Casanova was commissioned by the Venetian government to investigate and report on Kurtović's economic progress in Trieste.

In 1782 Kurtović sent a ship from Trieste to Philadelphia, then America's largest port. The Kurtović vessel was one of the first to begin to trade with the new republic which then was only a year old, and the ship was a sensation for Philadelphians who never received a foreign vessel like it before.

Jovo Kurtović who lived to the age of 91 and died in Trieste, then part of the Napoleonic empire, in 1809, was kum (godparent) to numerous Serbs of Trieste: Cvetko Jovanović, Antonia Kvekić, Josif Miletić, Jovan Nikolić, Dimitrije Rajović, Stefan Riznić (father of Jovan Riznic, Dragutin Teodorović, and Petar Teodorović.

Jovo was the first Serbian president of the Greco-Illyrian (Serbian) Saint Spyridon Church parish, and benefactor of the two communities and one of the founding fathers of commercial trade in Trieste. Although he was married three times and had many children, none survived him. He bequeathed his wealth to his nephew Maksim Kurtović while he was still alive.

== See also ==
- Serbs in Italy
- Saint Spyridon Church, Trieste
- Jovan Riznic
