= Maps and Politics: A Review of the Ethnographic Cartography of Macedonia =

Ethnographic geography book

- Author: Henry Robert Wilkinson
- Language: English
- Genre: Non-fiction
- Publisher: University of Liverpool Press
- Publication date: 1951
- Publication place: United Kingdom

Maps and Politics: A Review of the Ethnographic Cartography of Macedonia is a book written by British academic Henry Robert Wilkinson and published in 1951 by the University of Liverpool Press. It is a detailed study of 216 ethnographic maps of the region of Macedonia dating from 1730 until 1949. The book deals with the politicisation of Macedonia's geography during the era of nationalism. It explores the development of theories based on ethnography and claims made on a national basis in relation to the region. The study looks at ethnographers and their classification and distribution of local peoples in maps, their historical context, the criteria used for compiling maps and their quality, the role that either personal views or geopolitical considerations played in favouring one group over another, and knowledge (or lack thereof) of the region.

== Reception in scholarship ==
In a book review published in the American Slavic and East European Review, Philip E. Mosely (1952) said that Wilkinson "performed a notable service in assembling and subjecting to painstaking analysis the numerous cartographic studies" regarding Macedonia. Mosely wrote that the study "shows convincingly the complexities and uncertainties which beset even the most conscientious scholar, as well as the temptations which beckon to the politician." Another book review published in The Geographical Journal, J. C. S. (1953) stated that it was "a well produced monograph on the ethnographic maps of Macedonia" and a "valuable addition" to "studies in Geography".

John Brian Harley (1988) wrote that Wilkinson's study was "an excellent discussion" that looked at the "difficulty" of "representation" in cartography related to "cultural or technical causes". Loring M. Danforth (1997) stated that Wilkinson's study of the Macedonian Question "examined in detail" the significant role cartography played during its early stages. Kyril Drezov (1999) described the cartographic study as a "painstaking analysis" and that Wilkinson's book is "indispensable reading for everyone who wants to orient himself in the web of mutually exclusive claims about Macedonia". Leften Stavros Stavrianos (2000) regards Wilkinson's work as "a good introduction to the Macedonian question" and a "valuable study". Dimitris Livanios (2008) considers the study by Wilkinson as a "rich collection" of content that covers "an interesting aspect" of the "paper warfare" and functionality of ethnological cartography regarding the region.
