= Katarina Jovanović =

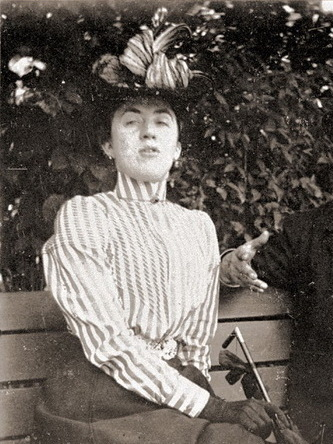
Katarina Jovanović, daughter of Anastas Jovanovic, sitting at the bench in Kelemegdan park

Katarina A. Jovanović (8 April 1869 – 31 May 1954) was a Serbian translator, literary historian, publicist, philosopher, journalist and humanitarian. She translated into German Petar II Petrović Njegoš's masterpiece "Mountain Wreath" (Gorski Vijenac).

== Biography ==
Katarina A. Jovanović was born in Belgrade, 8 April 1869. She spent most of her life abroad, having lived only 16 years in Serbia. Never forgetting her homeland, Katarina started her humanitarian work during the Balkan Wars. Thanks to her work, the Swiss Red Cross sent its mission and hospital in 1914, when the World War I broke out. She participated in the founding of the Department for Serbian Soldiers at the Swiss Red Cross and the "Zurich Bureau for the Location of Missing Persons", which was re-established during the World War II. She helped locate the missing, and organized distribution of humanitarian aid for the sick, wounded and imprisoned Serbian soldiers, their families and the families of the soldiers fighting at the Salonika front. Jovanović also helped Serbian schoolchildren and students, orphans and all those who found themselves far away from their homeland. Her kindness earned her the nickname “Little Mother” (Mamica). She died in Zürich on 31 May 1954.
