= Tito Vanzetti =

Tito Vanzetti (29 April 1809, Venice – 6 January 1888, Padua) was a surgeon and professor of medicine of the 19th century.

He studied surgery at the University of Padua under Bartolomeo Signoroni (1797-1844) and at the University of Vienna with Joseph Wattmann (1789-1866). Several years later, he was appointed professor of clinical surgery and ophthalmology at the University of Kharkiv. In 1853 he returned to Padua as a professor of clinical surgery.

In 1846 he performed the first ovariotomy in Russia. Vanzetti is credited for introducing a procedure of manual compression for treatment of popliteal aneurysms.

He became rector of the University of Padua in 1864. Together with other 16 professors, he was dismissed in 1866, after the annexation of Venetia to Italy, because of his position of support to old Austrian rule. He was reintegrated soon after, under international pressure.

He was made member of several scientific academies and societies.

== Associated eponym ==
- Vanzetti's sign: In sciatica the pelvis is always horizontal in spite of scoliosis; but in other lesions with scoliosis the pelvis is inclined.
