= Podi, Herceg Novi =

Village in Herceg Novi, Montenegro

Podi Поди
- Town
- Location within Montenegro
- Country: Montenegro
- Region: Coastal
- Municipality: Herceg Novi

Population (2011)
  - Total: 1,358
- Time zone: UTC+1 (CET)
  - Summer (DST): UTC+2 (CEST)

Podi (Montenegrin: Поди) is a village in the municipality of Herceg Novi, Montenegro.

== Demographics ==
According to the 2003 census, the town had a population of 1,199.

According to the 2011 census, its population was 1,358.

Ethnicity in 2011
Ethnicity	Number	Percentage
Serbs	767	56.5%
Montenegrins	405	29.8%
Croats	12	0.9%
other/undeclared	174	12.8%
Total	1,358	100%
