= Saint Spyridon Serbian Orthodox Church (Trieste) =

Serbian Orthodox church in Trieste, Italy

Coordinates: 45°39′05″N 13°46′24″E

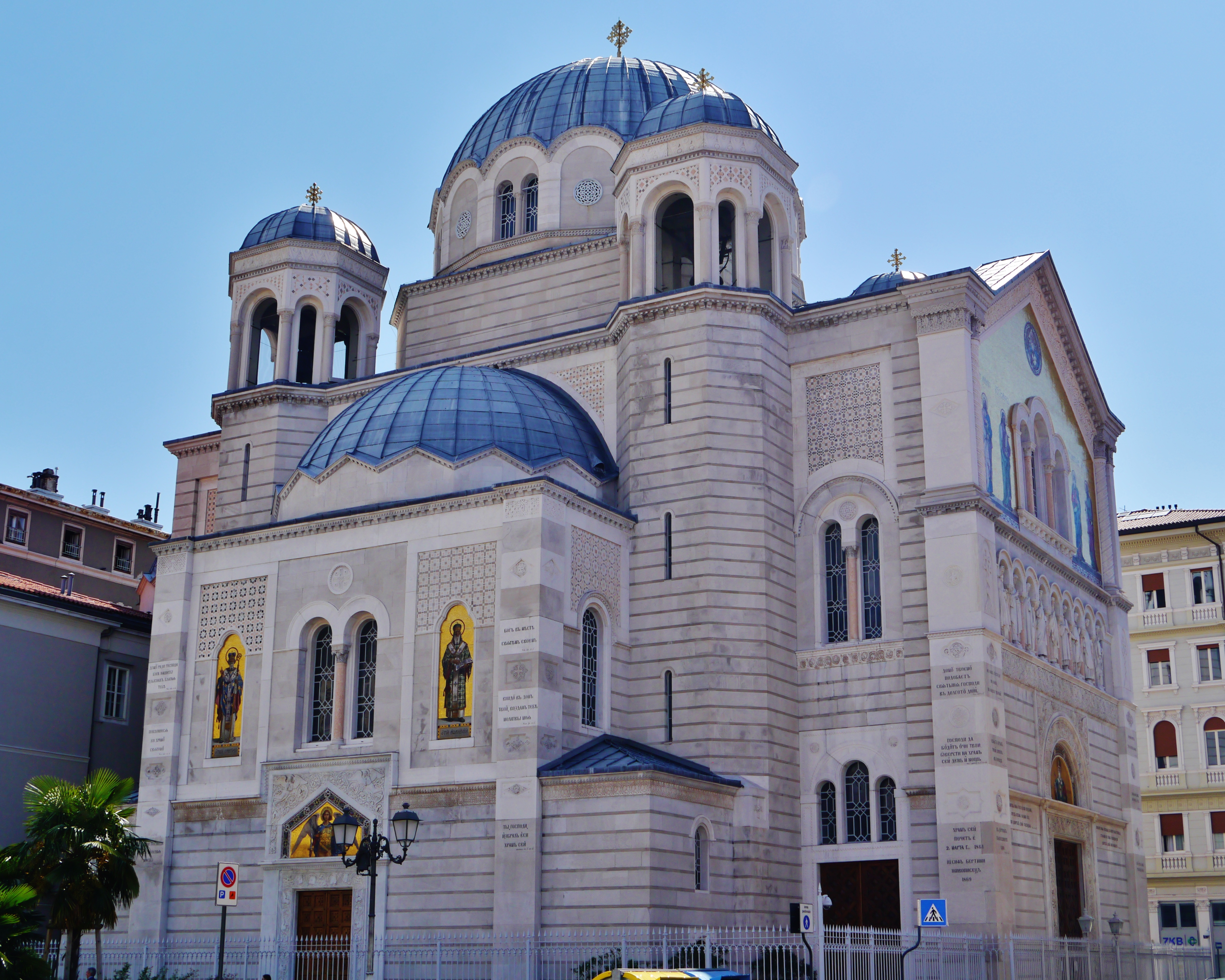
- Saint Spyridon Serbian Orthodox Church
- Saint Spyridon Serbian Orthodox Church
- Location: Trieste
- Country: Italy
- Denomination: Serbian Orthodox Church

History
- Dedication: Saint Spyridon

Architecture
- Architect: Carlo Maciachini
- Style: Neo-Byzantine
- Years built: 1861-1868

Administration
- Archdiocese: Serbian Orthodox Eparchy of Switzerland

Saint Spyridon Serbian Orthodox Church (Italian: Chiesa ortodossa serba di San Spiridione; Serbian: Српска православна црква светог Спиридона, romanized: Srpska pravoslavna crkva svetog Spiridona) is an Eastern Orthodox church located in Trieste, Italy. It is under jurisdiction of the Serbian Orthodox Eparchy of Switzerland of the Serbian Orthodox Church.

Church treasury holds numerous objects, historical documents, icons and various works of art, dating back to 1751. Next to the church is a Serbian curriculum school, named after Jovan Miletić, a wealthy merchant from Sarajevo who in his will left 24,000 florins for the education of the Serb children of Trieste.

== History ==
The Orthodox community in Trieste was established in 1748 but it was not until 1751 when Empress Maria Theresa allowed free practice of religion for Orthodox Christians, prompting immigration of Serb traders from Herceg Novi, Trebinje, and Sarajevo to Trieste. The first Eastern Orthodox Church was built in mid XVIII century and it served as a place of worship for local Serbs and Greeks both. The first service in the church was carried out in 1755, with two bell towers built in 1782. Disagreements between two ethnic groups on the issues of church affairs led to the dissolution of the joint community in 1781. The separate Serb community continued its work independently and as early as 1782 it was officially established. The Greeks left Saint Spyridon and later built a new church dedicated to Saint Nicholas. The Serbs eventually paid them 20,000 florins for their share of Saint Spyridon.

Due to the instability of the grounds on which the first church was erected, a join decision was made to demolish the existing one and to erect a second church. Construction began on March 2, 1861, and it was designed by architect Carlo Maciachini. The exterior decor was entrusted to Pompey Bertini and Antony Karelia, the interior painted decorations and the design of exterior decorations were done by Giuseppe Bertini, while Emilio Bisi produced sculptures for the facade. The marble used to build the church comes from Carrara, Verona, Karst Plateau, and Istria. Construction of the church was finished on 2 September 1868, and a small consecration took place on 20 September 1869.

The first permanent Serbian priest in Trieste was Haralampije Mamula from Ogulin in the western Military Frontier. He served from 1771 until his death in 1790.

== Gallery ==
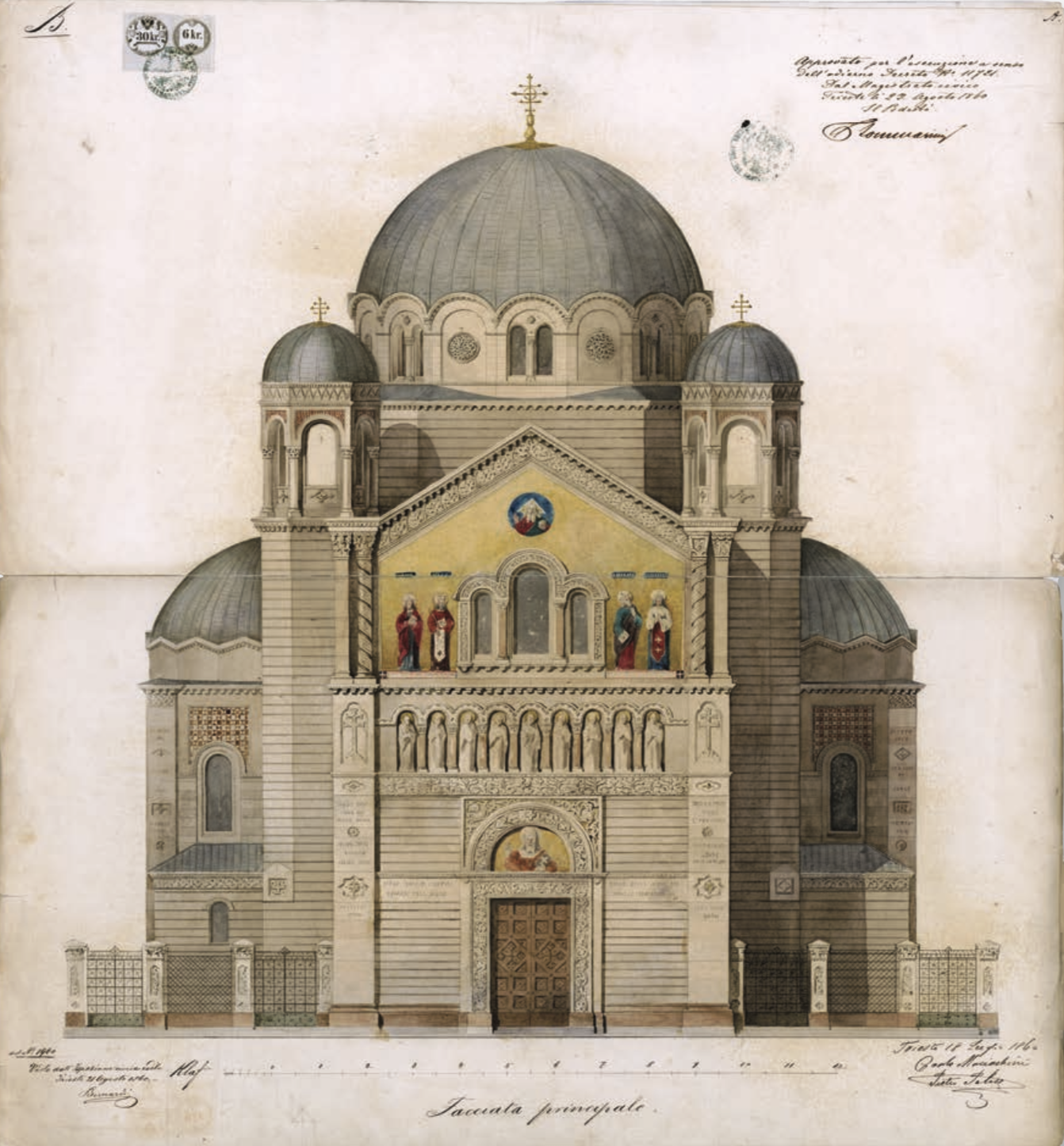
Maciachini's project, 1860

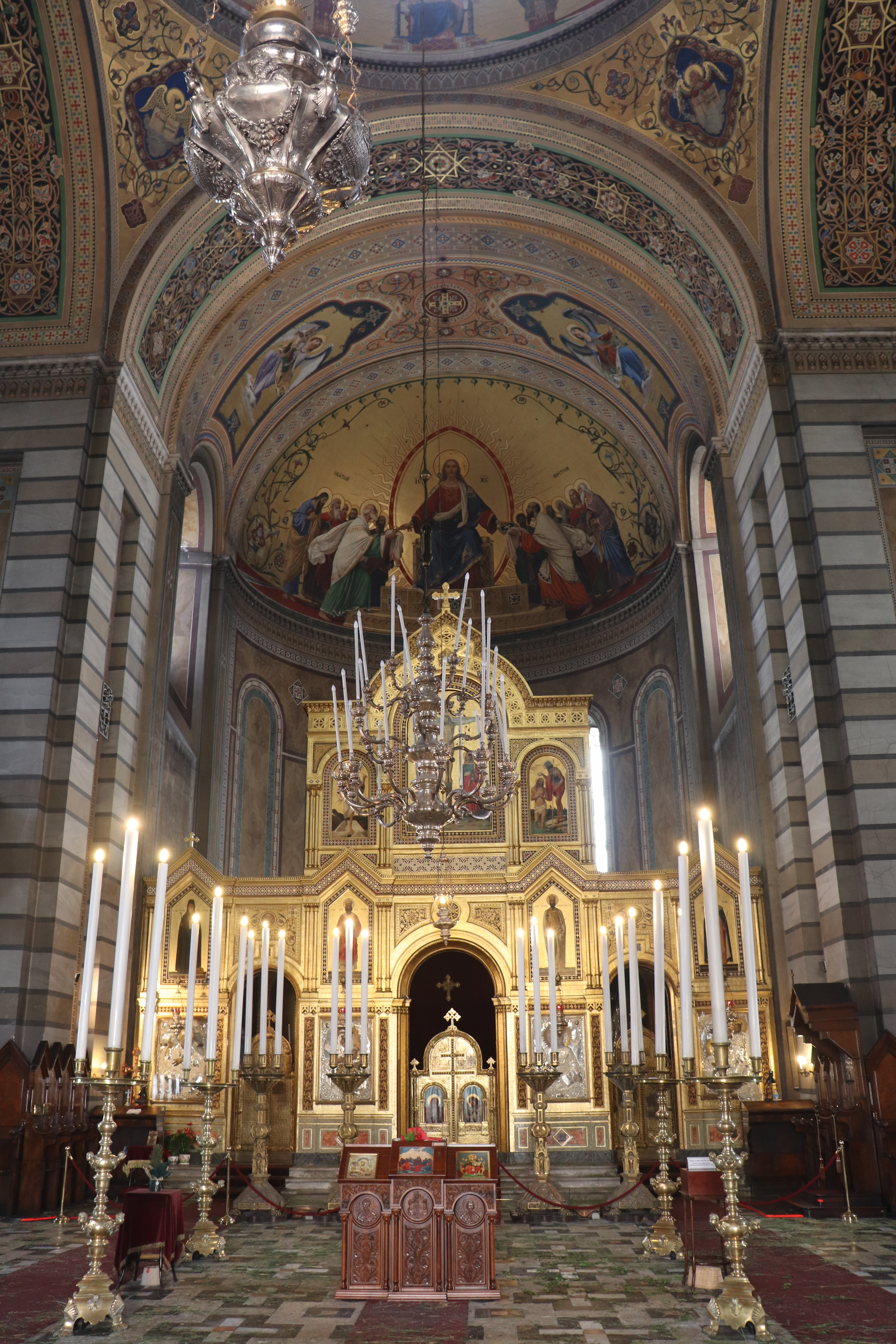
Altar

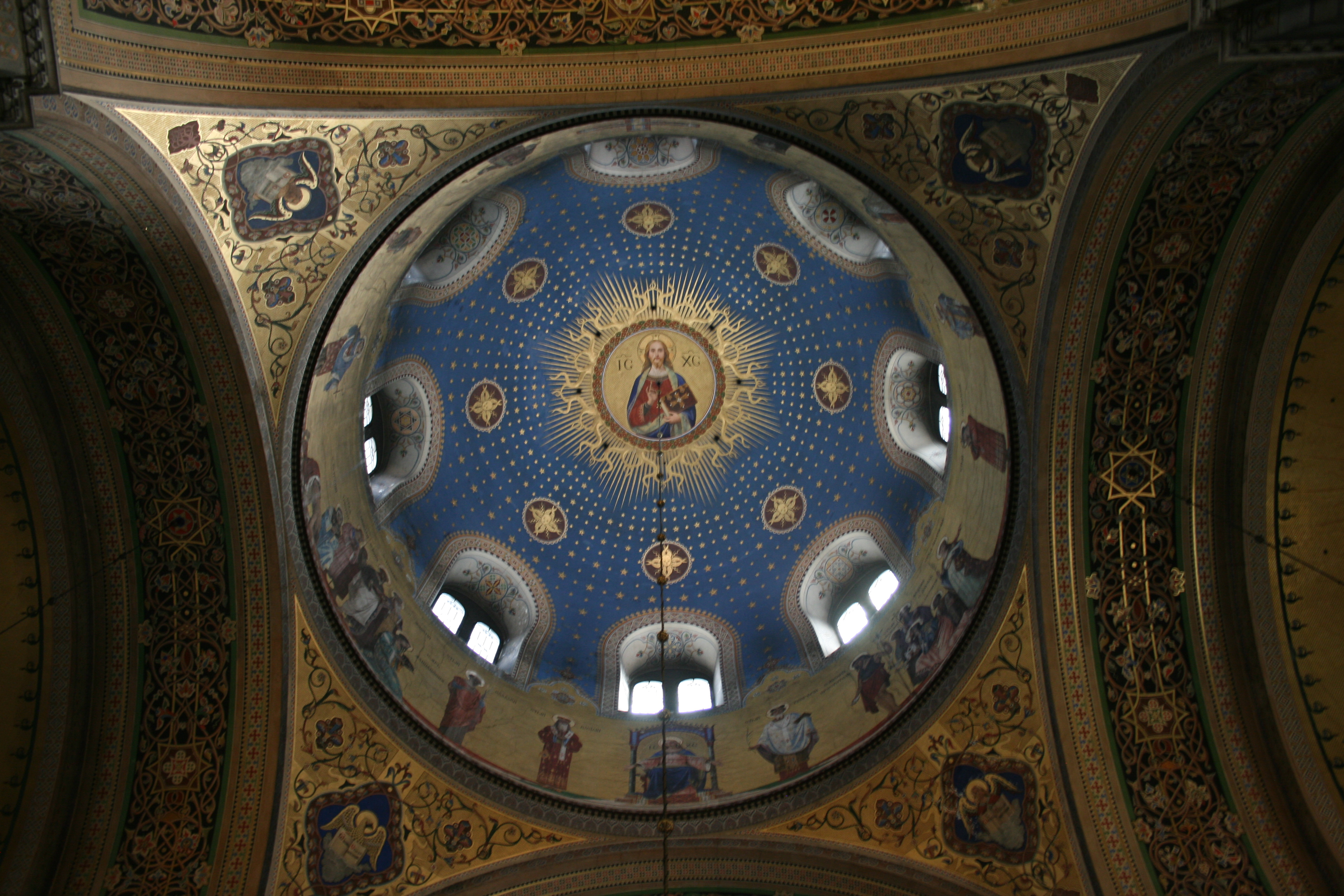
Dome

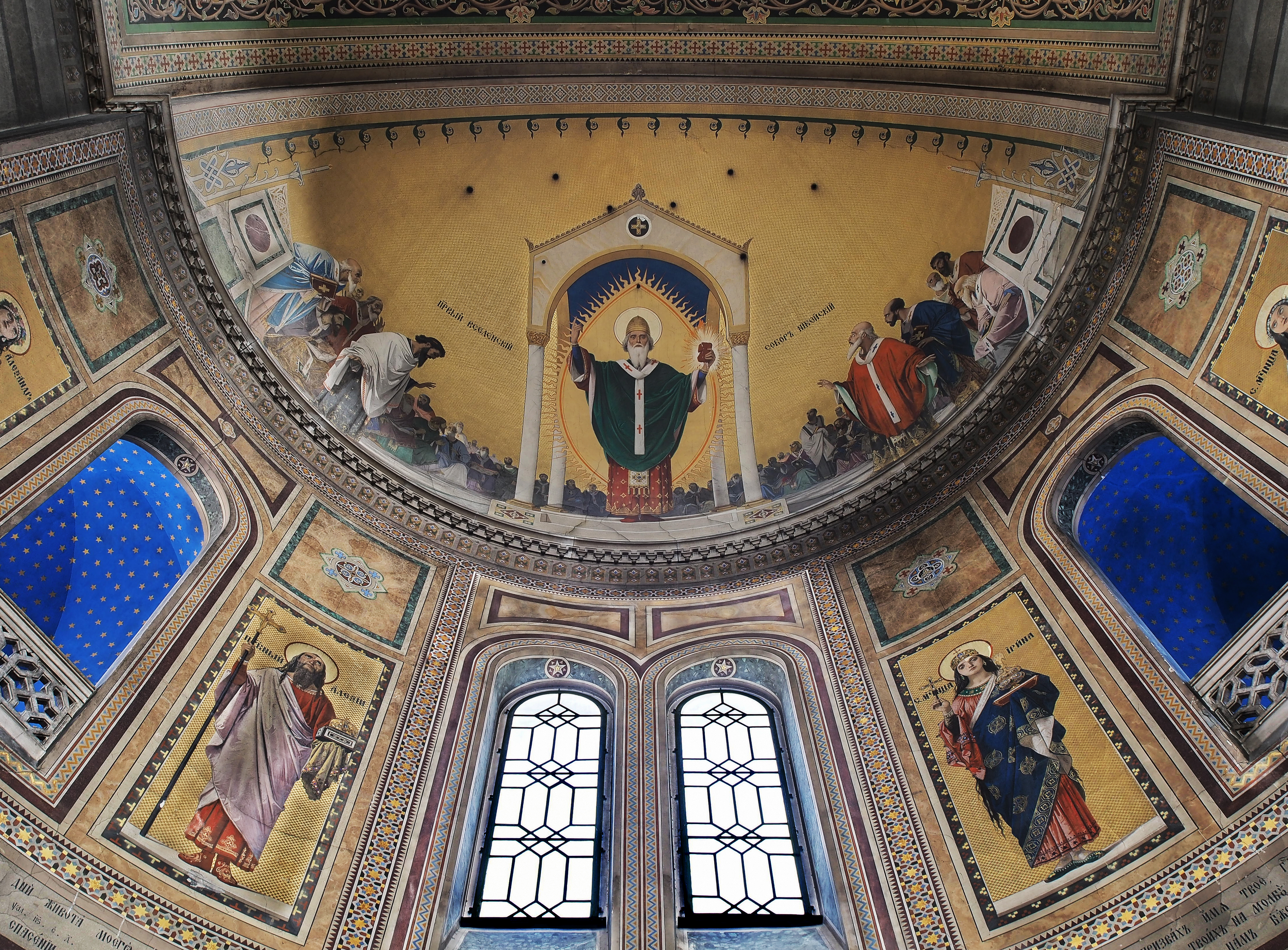
Ceiling of southern transept

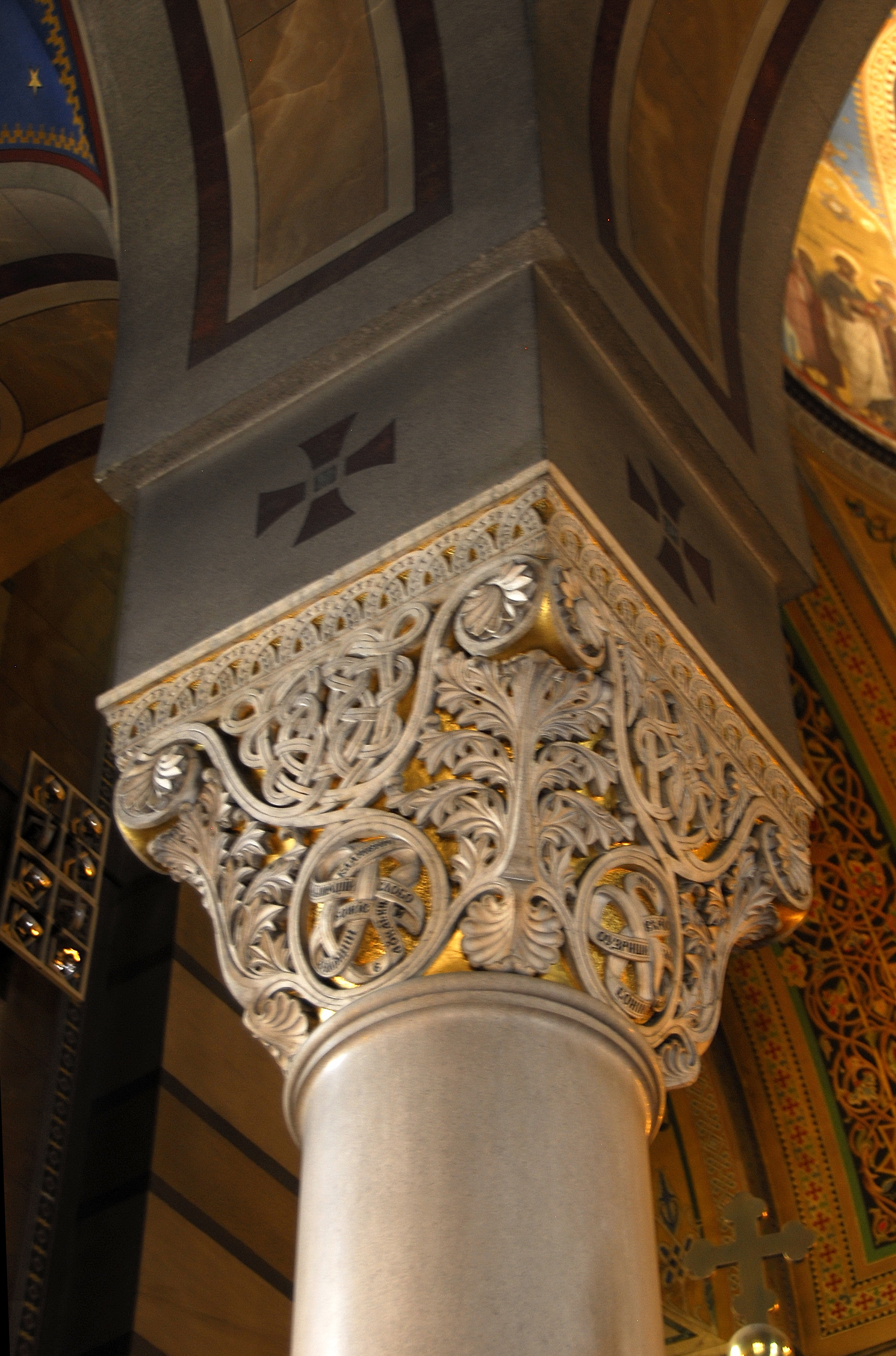
Column details

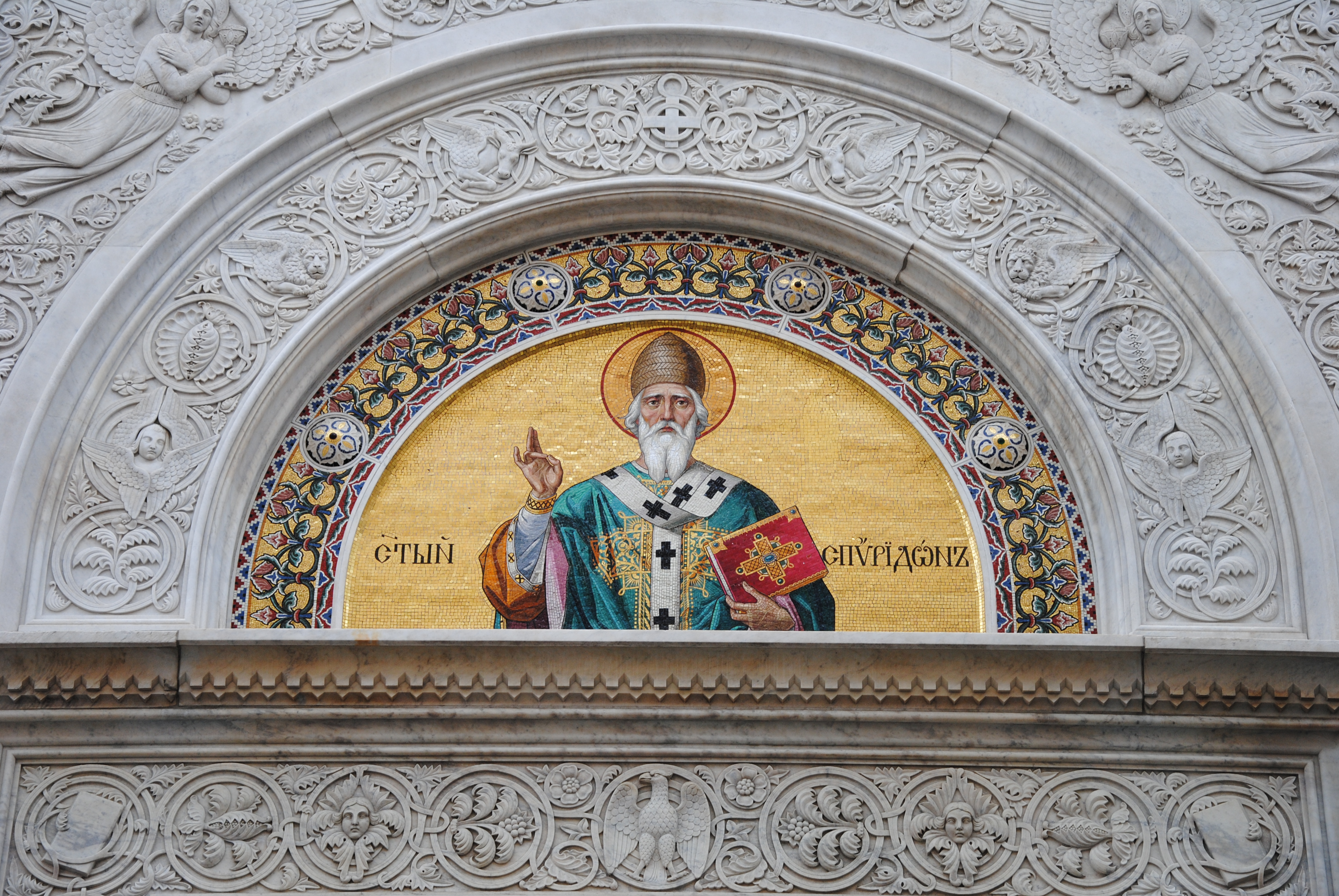
Saint Spyridon

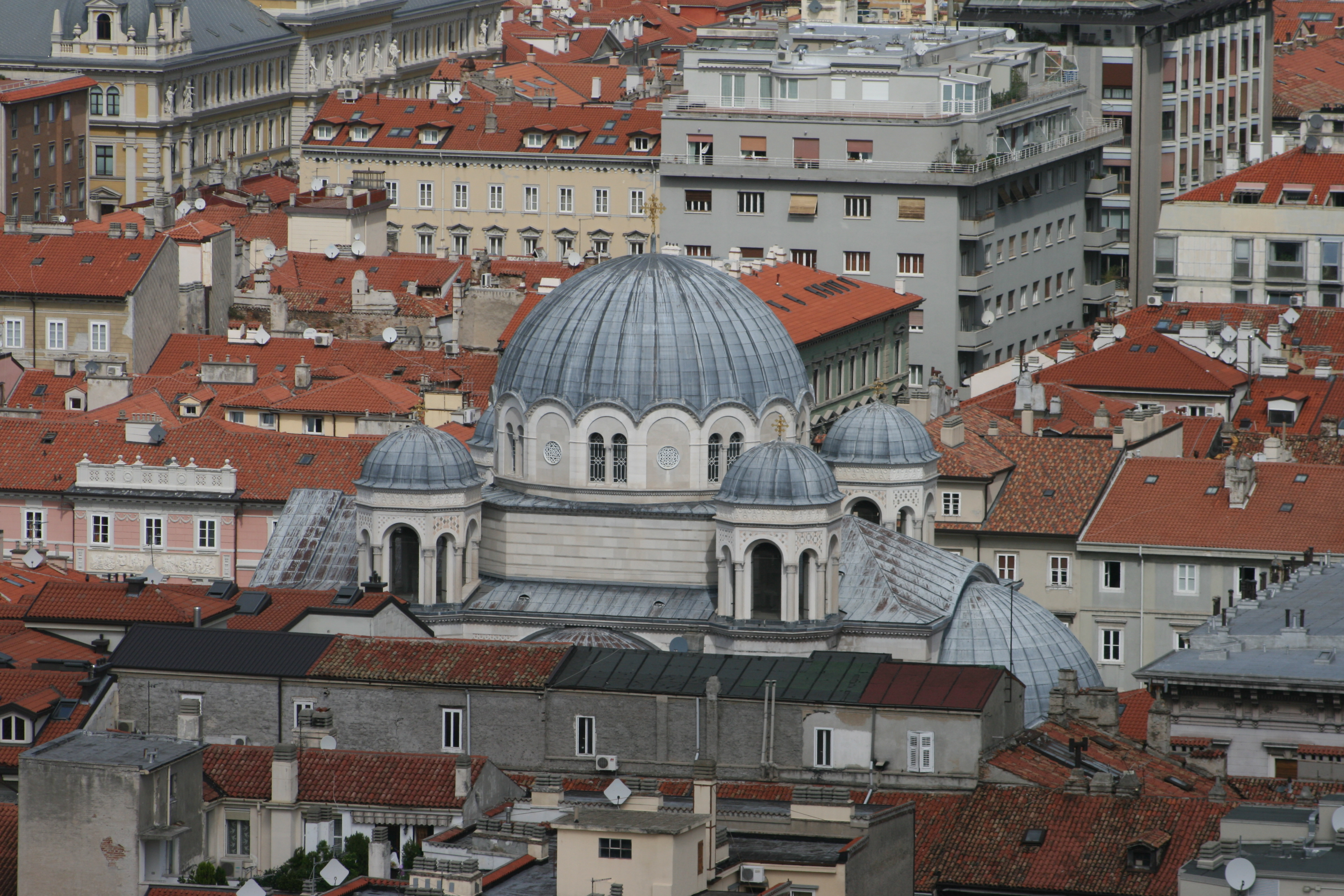
Domes of the church

== See also ==
- Serbian Orthodox Eparchy of Switzerland
- Serbs in Italy
