= Serbs in Italy =

Ethnic group

Serbi in Italia Срби у Италији Srbi u Italiji
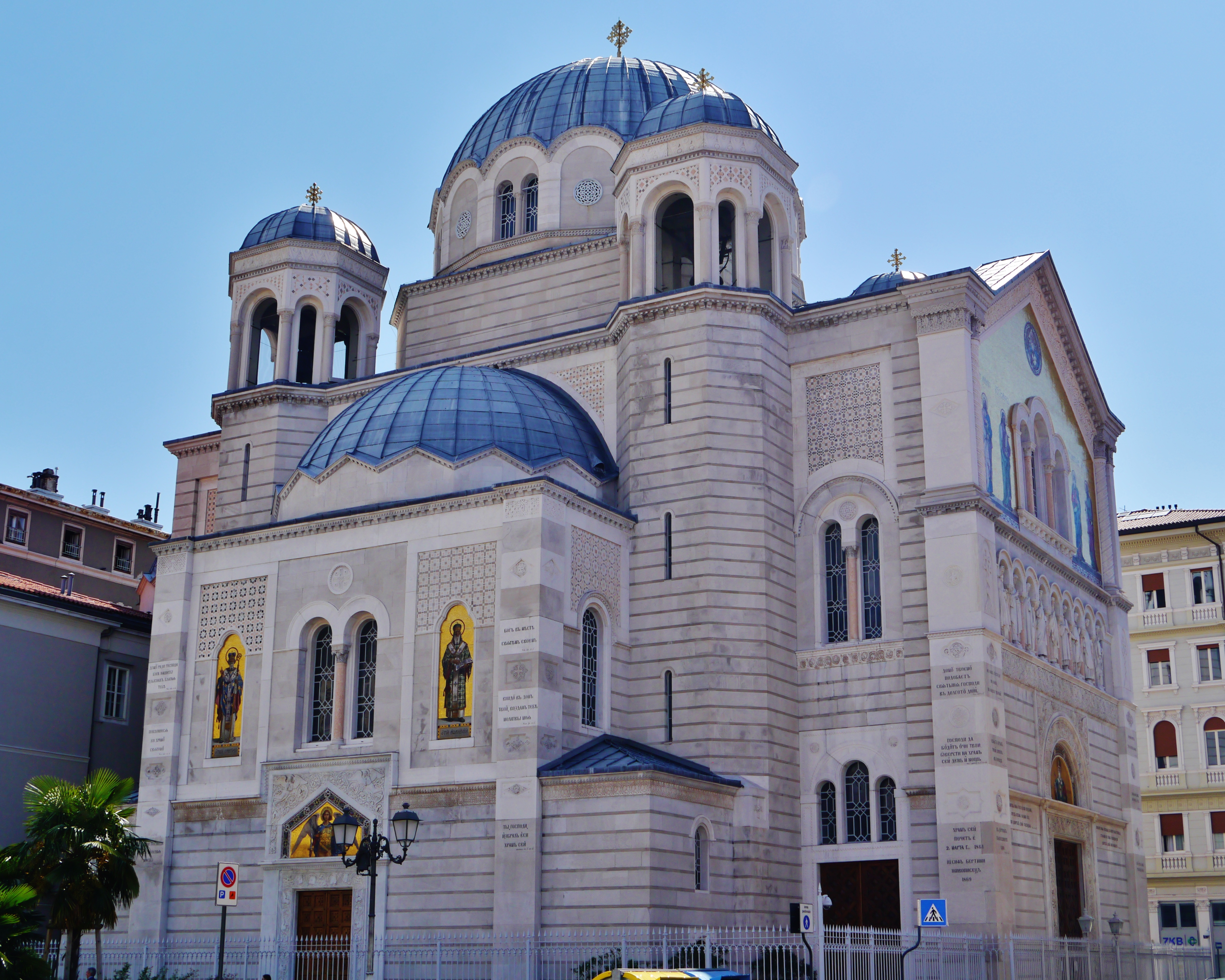
- Saint Spyridon Serbian Orthodox Church in Trieste

Total population
- 29,679 (2024)

Regions with significant populations
- Veneto, Friuli-Venezia Giulia, Lombardia

Languages
- Serbian and Italian

Religion
- Eastern Orthodoxy (Serbian Orthodox Church)

Serbs in Italy are Italian citizens of Serb ethnic descent or Serbia-born people who reside in Italy. According to data from 2024, there were 29,679 Serbia-born people in Italy. The city of Trieste has served as the cultural capital of Serbs in Italy for over three centuries.

== History ==
The history of Serbs in Italy is intertwinned with the city of Trieste.

At the start of the 18th century, Serb merchants, mostly from Sarajevo, Trebinje, and the Bay of Kotor, established a community in Trieste, which as a free port, served as the Austrian Empire's outlet to the world. The most influential of the wealthy Serbian merchants of the time were the Gopčević, Kvekić, Kurtović, Vojnović, Vučetić, Popović, Teodorović, Nikolić, Škuljević, Opujić, Rajović, Mekša, Kovačević, and Miletić families, who owned most of the structures and dock area of the Porto Vecchio (lit. 'Old Port'). In 1766, Triestine Serbs numbered 50; by 1780, the number had grown to 200.

In 1751, Austrian Empress Maria Theresa proclaimed religious freedom in the city, and the Serbs and Greeks of Trieste built the Saint Spyridon Church that same year. In 1782, the Serbian Orthodox and Greek Orthodox communities of Trieste split due to major disagreements concerning church rituals and language-usage, at which point the Greek community built its own Greek Orthodox Church of San Nicolò dei Greci in the neoclassical style, and the Serbs continued to use the original church of Saint Spyridon. But in 1861, the Serb community demolished the original church, and rebuilt a new, much more grandiose one in its stead, in Serbo-Byzantine Revival style, in order to "stamp their identity architecturally in the midst of a baroque Austro-Italian city". The church's construction was completed seven years later, in 1868. With the added capacity for 1,600 worshippers, it was for a long time the second-largest Serbian Orthodox church in the world. The church is filled with liturgical masterpieces of the time—including works in gold from the 17th and 18th centuries, and antique Orthodox icons and handmade books—making it an important monument to Serbian history and culture. The Serbian population in Trieste numbered 309 in the year 1802, and approximately 500 in 1864.

In 1782, the Serbian community of Trieste expressed its desire for a Serbian-language day school, a place for their children to be passed down Serbian culture and language. Jovan Miletić, a wealthy Serb merchant, donated 24,000 florins to build a Serbian elementary school in 1787. In 1792, the local government approved its opening, and the Jovan Miletić Private School began operation, located in the downtown, right beside the Saint Spyridon Church. A night school and reading room were opened in 1911. In 1911, an asylum was added to the school, for Serbian political refugees, due to the constant warfare and bloodshed occurring between the Austro-Hungarian and Ottoman empires on the Balkan Peninsula. The school represented a pillar of the Serbian community of Trieste, where the children of the wealthy Serbian merchants went to school and integrated into the city's community. In 1973, the school was shut down due to lack of student enrollment and became a Sunday school for Serbian language and culture.

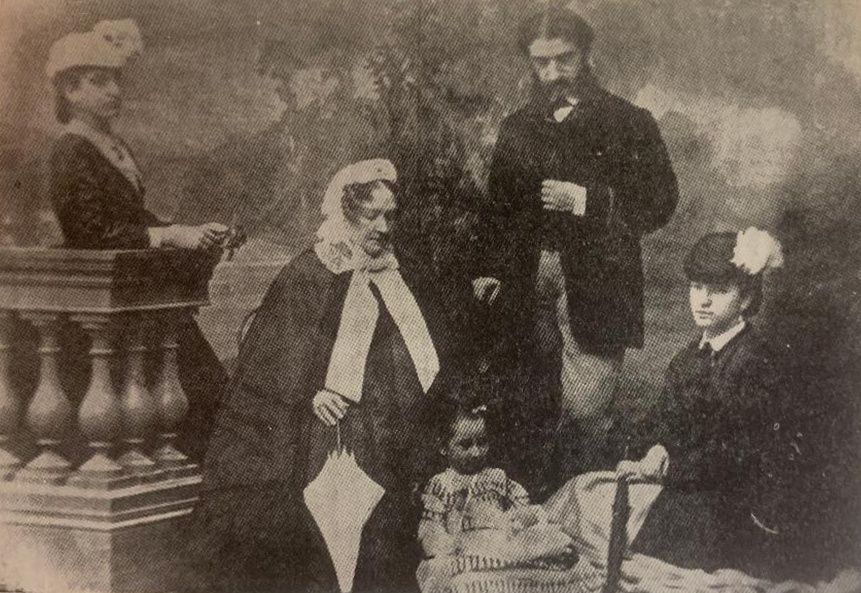
Members of the prominent Triestine Serb Kvekić family with Princess Olga of Montenegro. From left to right: Darinka Kvekić, mother of Princess Olga; Elisabetta Cattarina Kvekich (née Contessa de Mircovich), the family matriarch; Nikola Kvekić (standing); and Aspasia Kvekić (right).

Besides the Saint Spyridon Church and the Jovan Miletić Serbian School, the Serbs of Trieste contributed to several other important landmarks of the city. The Gopčević family built the Palazzo Gopcevich on the Canale Grande, near the St. Spyridon Serbian Church, in 1850 in commemoration of the heroes who fought for the independence of Serbia from the Ottoman Empire. Cristoforo Popovich owned many famous merchant ships in Trieste, some of the largest in the Adriatic—the Tartana, Il Feroce Dalmata, La Forza, and the Ripatriato - and was instrumental in the Russian-side during the Crimean War. Cristoforo Scuglievich (Risto Skuljevic) built the Palazzo Scuglievich in the mid-1800s along the banks of the city, and donated the palace in his will to the Serbian community of Trieste; today it is owned by the Serb community. In addition to this, in the city center there are also the palaces of Serb merchants, such as the Palazzo Vucetich, Palazzo Popovich, Palazzo Kurtovich, Palazzo Riznich, Palazzo Ivanovic, Palazzo Kovacevich, Palazzo Palikucha, Palazzo Bota, Palazzo Teodorovich, Palazzo Nikolich, Palazzo Stella Polare and many others. Triestine Serbs participated in city administration by 1809 and had seats on the municipal council as early as 1812, when the city was part of the French Illyrian Provinces.

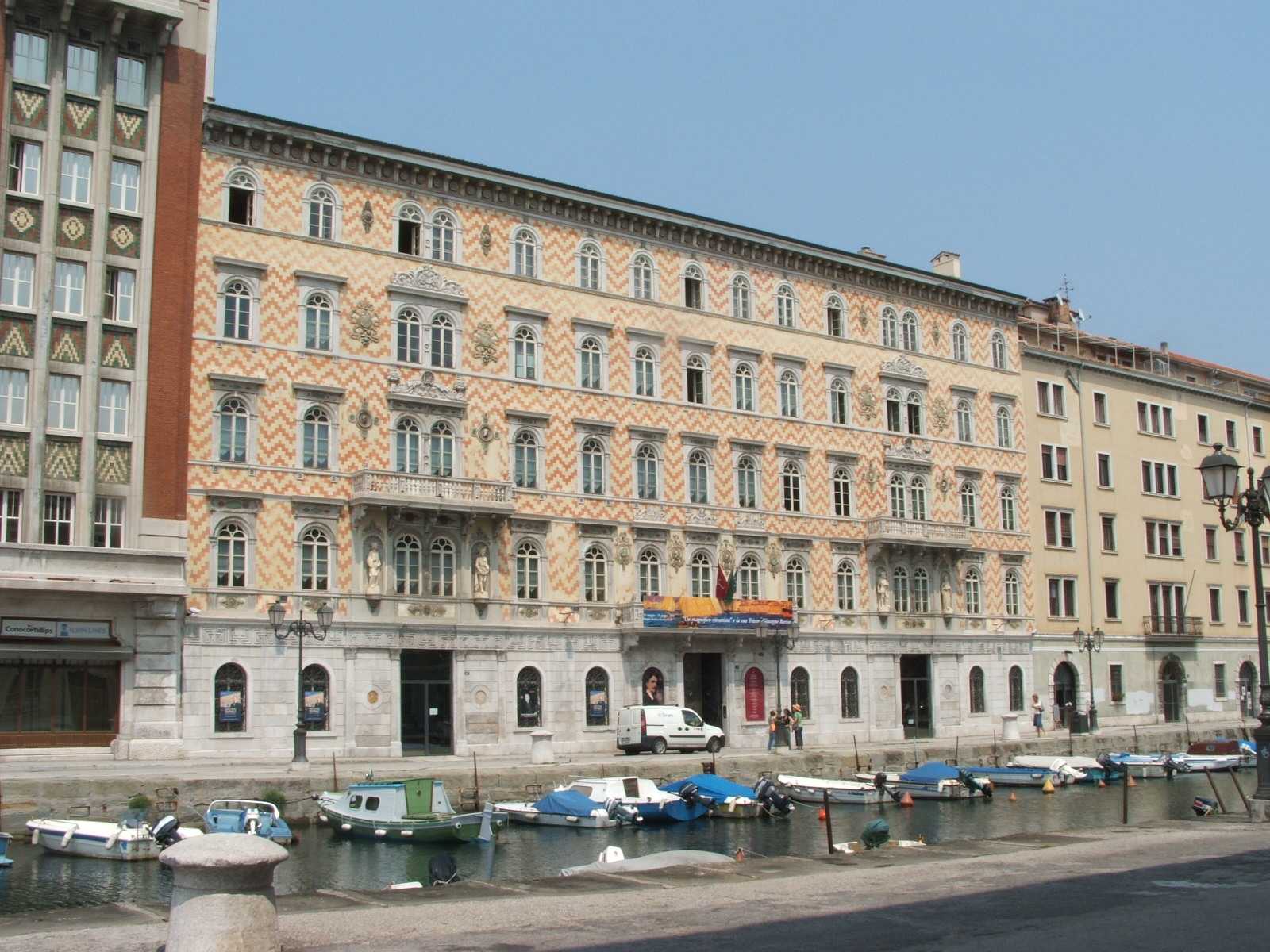
Palazzo Gopcevich, Canal Grande, Trieste

After the World War I, Trieste became part of Italy and social life drastically changed for the Serbs. Due to the contentious national border with Kingdom of Yugoslavia, Italian society became increasingly hostile towards all Slavs in Trieste, including the Serbs, as anti-Slavic attitudes began to flourish in Italy.The anti-Slavic propaganda focused on the idea that Slavic people were barbaric and could not integrate properly into a civilized society. Tensions came to a head in World War II, when the Germans, who had occupied northern Italy in 1943, built the only Nazi extermination camp in Italy, Risiera di San Sabba, on the outskirts of Trieste. Three thousand Jews, Serbs, and other Slavs were executed here in 1944, while thousands more were imprisoned awaiting transfer to other extermination camps.

Nowadays, Serbia-born Serbs represent one of the largest foreign-born community in Trieste, numbering around 5,000. The overwhelming majority of Serbs in Trieste descend from the immigration wave following the Yugoslav Wars of the 1990s. Recently, the Serbian Orthodox Society in Trieste has called on the local government to grant the Serb Community of Trieste cultural autonomy and reinstate the Jovan Miletic Serbian School as a full-time school since its downgrading to a Sunday school due to inactivity in 1973.

== Demographics ==
According to the official data from 2024, 29,679 Serbia-born people live in Italy, with 70% of them in regions of Veneto (10,277) and Friuli-Venezia Giulia (5,444). Lombardy (4,229) and Emilia-Romagna (2,485) follow, driven by employment in manufacturing and services. Trieste with its 3,667 Serbia-born inhabitants is the city with largest concentration of Serbs in Italy.

The exact number of ethnic Serbs in Italy is not known, as the Italian government does not collect data on ethnic groups in its census or national statistics. The Federation of Serbs in Italy estimates the community size at over 60,000 people as of 2021.

== Organizations ==
There are several Serb community organizations in Italy.

The Association of Serbs of Italy was established in 2015 at the meeting in Trieste.

Since 2009, the Serbian Association "Vuk Karadžić", has been organizing an annual Balkan-style trumpet festival on the outskirts of Trieste called "Guča on Karst" (Guča na Karstu) modeled after the famous Guča Trumpet Festival in Serbia. Since its beginnings, the festival has managed to gain recognition and popularity, succeeding in getting famous musicians like Goran Bregović, as well as many popular Italian acts.

The oldest active Serbian sports organisation in Trieste is the amateur football club "Serbia Sport", founded in 1992, which has won a multitude of championships in the local Trieste football league. It organizes an annual Serbian-Diaspora Football Tournament in Trieste on the Serbian holiday Spasovdan.

== Notable people ==
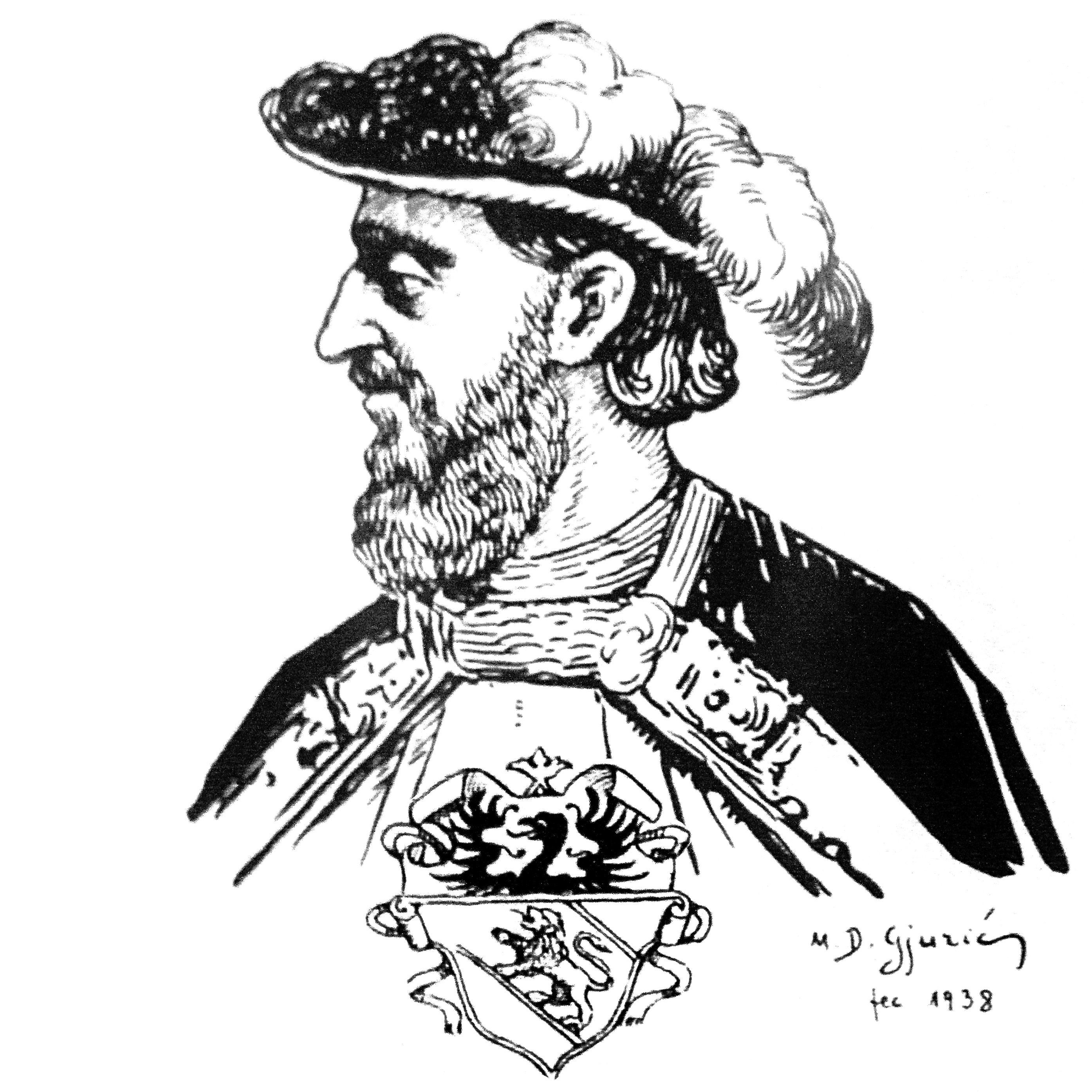
Božidar Vuković

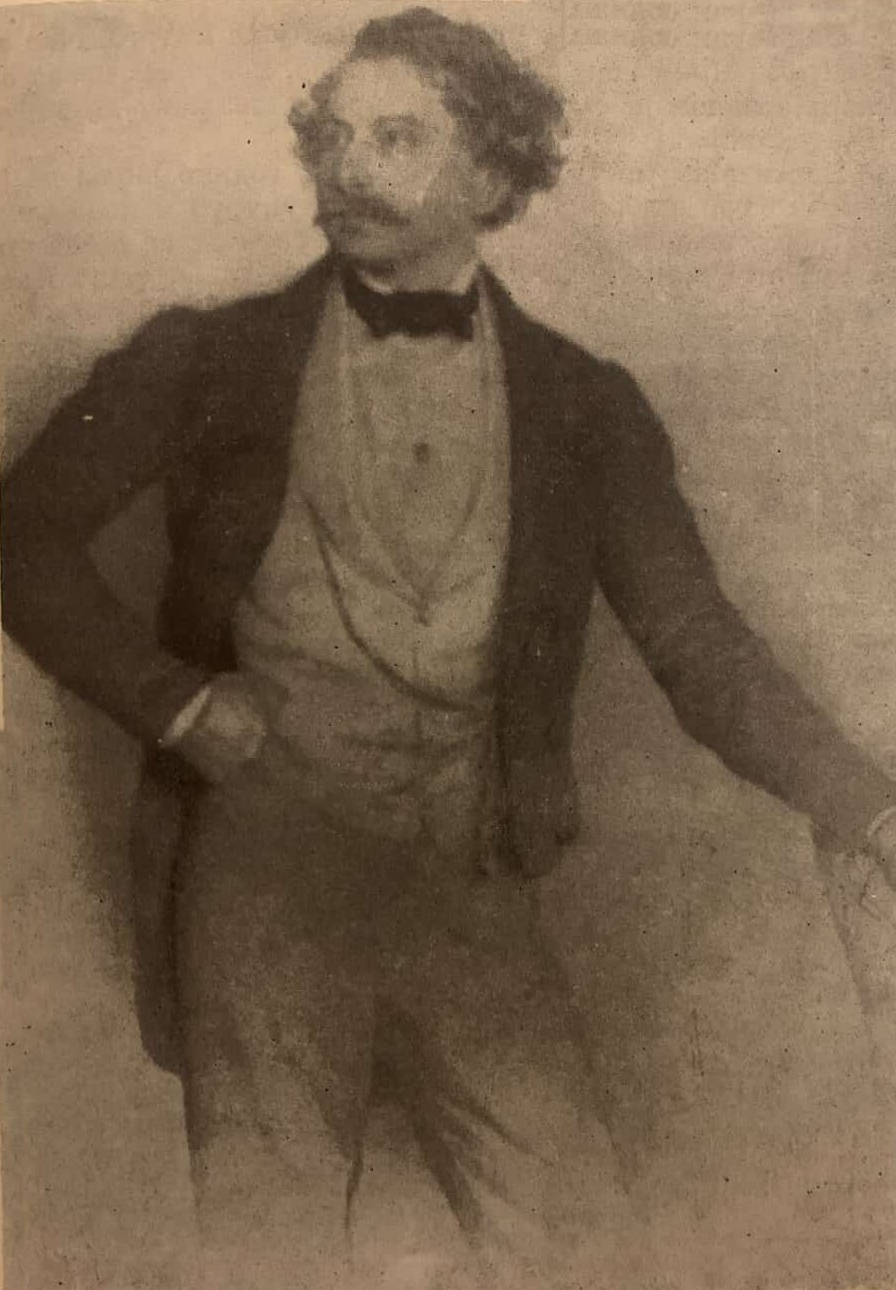
Spiridione Gopcevich

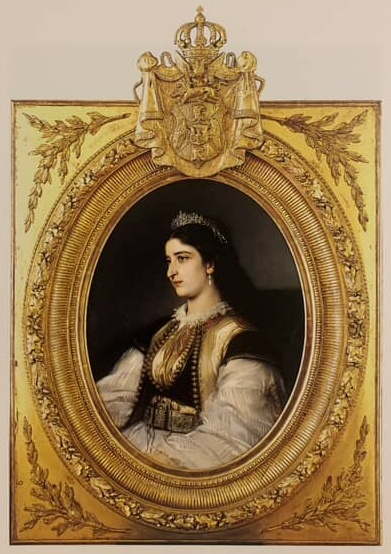
Darinka Kvekić

Ivan Rassimov

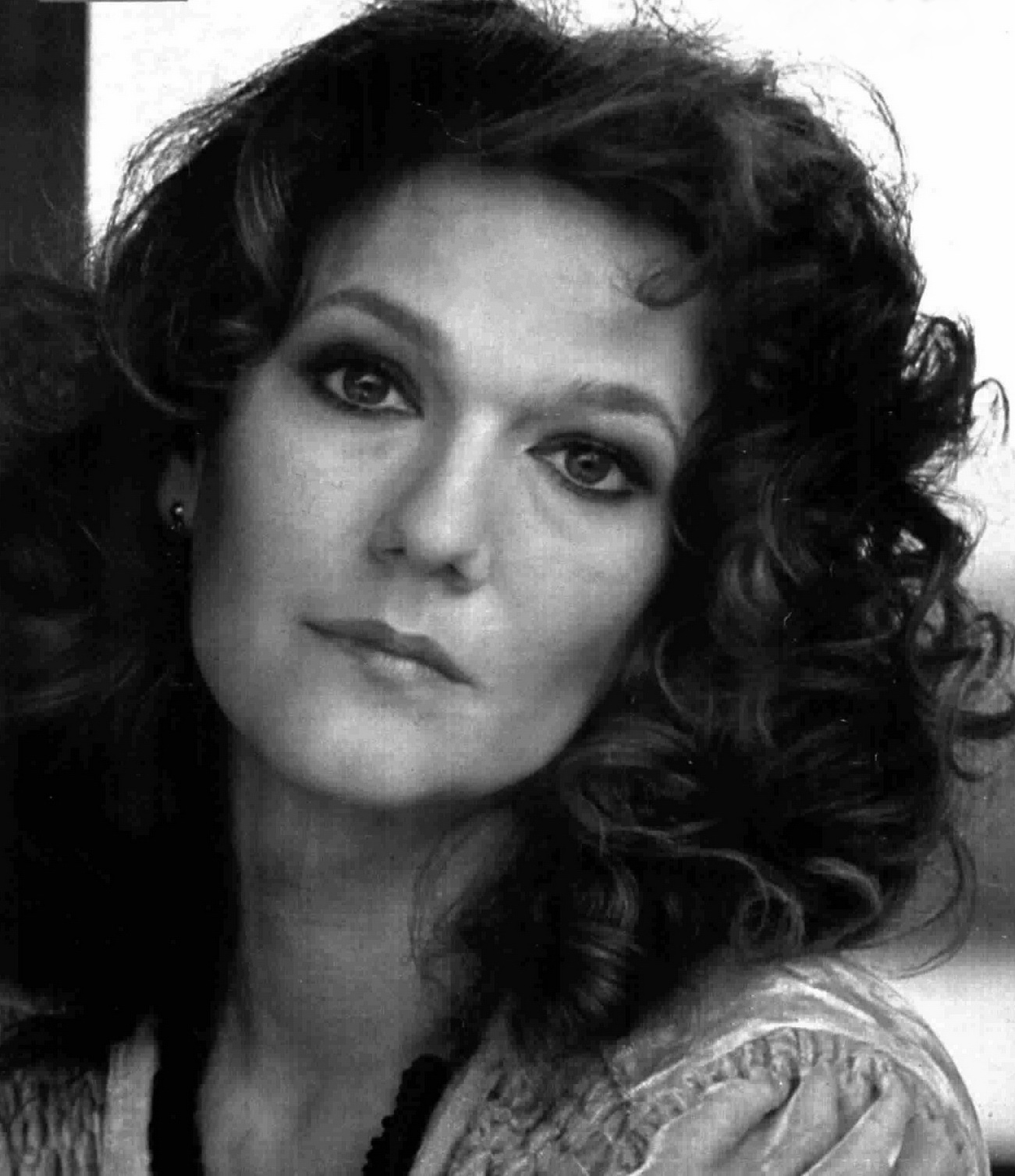
Rada Rassimov

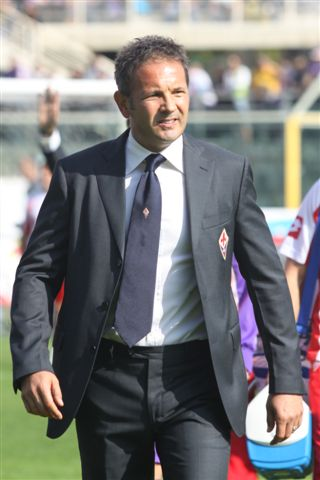
Siniša Mihajlović

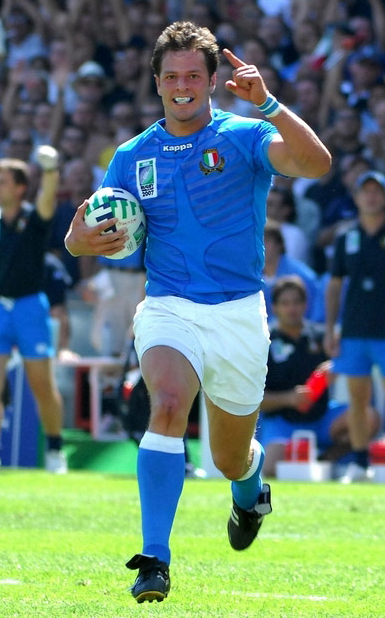
Marko Stanojevic

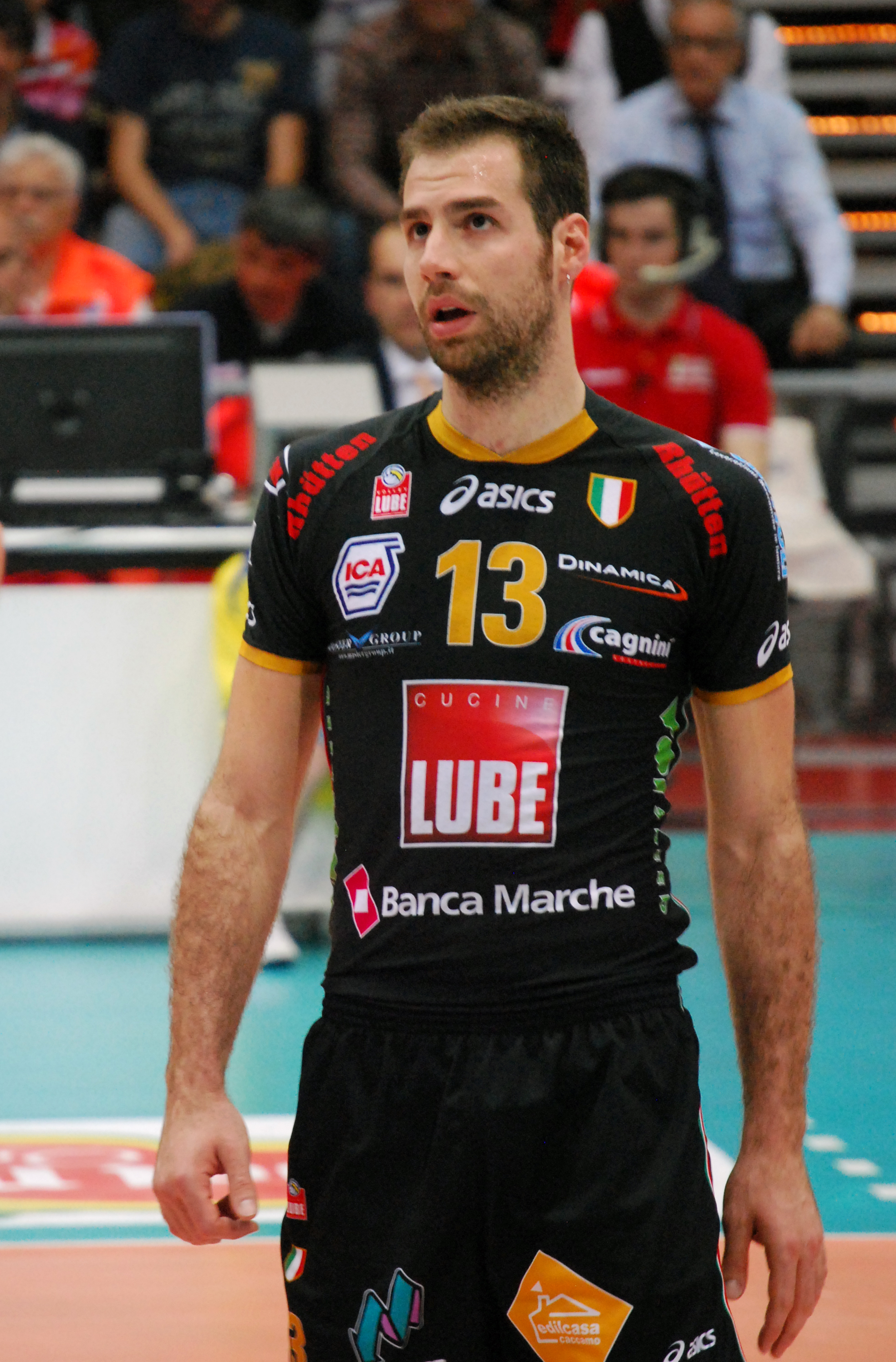
Dragan Travica

- María Baxa – actress
- Olga Bisera – actress
- Alessandro Egger – actor
- Spiridione Gopcevich – shipowner
- Spiridon Gopčević – scientist
- Cristoforo Ivanovich – librettist
- Darinka Kvekić – princess of Montenegro
- Natalija Konstantinović – princess of Montenegro
- Beba Lončar – actress
- Tomo Medin – writer and adventurer
- Siniša Mihajlović – football player and coach
- Sasha Montenegro – actress
- Giovanni Raicevich – wrestler
- Ivan Rassimov – actor
- Rada Rassimov – actress
- Nina Seničar – model and actress
- Aleksandar Stanković – football player
- Marko Stanojevic – rugby union player
- Dragan Travica – volleyball player
- Mihajlo Vučetić – merchant, shipowner
- Božidar Vuković – printer
- Vićenco Vuković – printer
- Ljudevit Vuličević – writer
- Stefano Zannowich – writer and adventurer
- Milan Zloković – architect

== See also ==
- Immigration to Italy
- Serb diaspora
- Italy–Serbia relations
