= Atanasije Jevtić =

Serbian Orthodox bishop (1938–2021)

His Grace Atanasije Jevtić
- Bishop
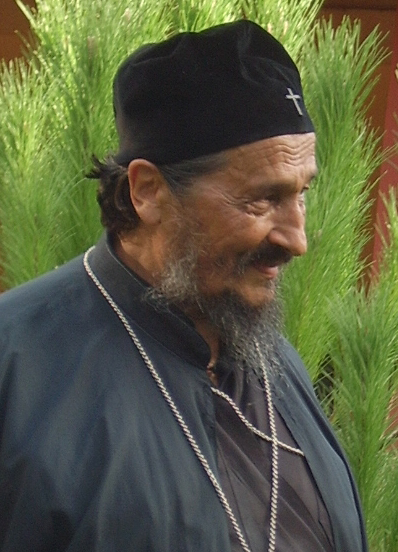
- Bishop Atanasije in Trebinje, 2011
- Church: Serbian Orthodox Church
- Diocese: Eparchy of Zachlumia, Herzegovina and the Littoral
- Elected: May 1992
- Retired: September 1999
- Predecessor: Vladislav Mitrović
- Successor: Grigorije Durić
- Previous post: Bishop of Banat (1991–1992)

Orders
- Ordination: 3 December 1960 by Justin (Popović)
- Consecration: 7 July 1991 by Patriarch Pavle
- Rank: Bishop

Personal details
- Born: Zoran Jevtić; 8 January 1938 Brdarica, Kingdom of Yugoslavia
- Died: 4 March 2021 (aged 83) Trebinje, Bosnia and Herzegovina
- Buried: Tvrdoš Monastery
- Denomination: Eastern Orthodoxy

Atanasije Jevtić (Serbian Cyrillic: Атанасије Јевтић; 8 January 1938 – 4 March 2021) was a Serbian Orthodox prelate who served as the bishop of Banat from 1991 until 1992, and the bishop of Zachlumia, Herzegovina, and the Littoral from 1992 until his retirement in 1999.

Atanasije was a long-time professor and former dean of the Orthodox Theological Faculty of the University of Belgrade. He was a leading expert on Patristics and has written a series of books on the subject. Together with bishop Amfilohije Radović, Atanasije translated the Deuterocanonical books of the Old Testament to Serbian language.

== Biography ==
Atanasije was born on 8 January 1938 in the village of Brdarica near Valjevo, Yugoslavia.

=== Consecration ===
On 7 July 1991 on the feast of the Nativity of John the Baptist, Archimandrite Atanasije was consecrated as Bishop of Banat at the Saint Nicholas Cathedral in Vršac by Pavle, Serbian Patriarch, Metropolitan Nikolaj Mrđa of Dabar and Bosnia, Metropolitan Amfilohije Radović of Montenegro and the Littoral, Bishops Irinej Bulović of Bačka, Stefan Boca of Žiča, Artemije Radosavljević of Raška and Prizren, Dositej Motika of Britain and Scandinavia, Nikanor Bogunović of Upper Karlovac, Vasilije Vadić of Srem, and Lavrentije Trifunović of Šabac and Valjevo.

Atanasije also briefly served as administrator of the Eparchy of Raška and Prizren in 2010 after Bishop Artemije Radosavljević was forced to resign from his position due to alleged embezzlement of funds.

=== Illness and death ===
He died on 4 March 2021 in Trebinje, from complications of COVID-19 during the COVID-19 pandemic in Bosnia and Herzegovina. He was buried at the cemetery of Tvrdoš Monastery three days later, on 6 March.

Some authors described Atanasije's death as "the possible end of the golden era of theology".

Porfirije, Serbian Patriarch stated that he is one of the three most notable Serb theologians to be recognized internationally.

Patriarch Daniel of Romania stated that Anatansije's body of work is of significant importance to all Orthodox Christianity.

== Awards ==
- Order of the Republika Srpska, 2012
- Order of Njegoš
- Seal of herzog Šćepan, 2018

== Selected works ==
- Jevtić, Atanasije (1973). "Uvod u teologiju kapadokidijskih otaca o Svetome Duhu" (PDF). Teološki pogledi. 6 (1): 22–36. Archived from the original (PDF) on 2018-03-23.
- Jevtić, Atanasije (1981). "Drugi Vaseljenski sabor" (PDF). Teološki pogledi. 14 (1–3): 81–96. Archived from the original (PDF) on 2018-03-23.
- Jevtić, Atanasije, ed. (1986). Sabornost-katoličnost Crkve: Zbornik članaka pravoslavnih teologa. Vol. 1. Beograd: Bogoslovski fakultet SPC.
- Jevtić, Atanasije (1989). "Hronika stradanja Srba na Kosovu i u Metohiji (1941-1989)" (PDF). Bogoslovlje: Časopis Pravoslavnog bogoslovskog fakulteta u Beogradu. 33 (1–2): 55–79. Archived from the original (PDF) on 2019-09-24.
- Jevtić, Atanasije (1990). Stradanja Srba na Kosovu i Metohiji od 1941. do 1990. Priština: Jedinstvo. ISBN 9788670190658.
- Jevtić, Atanasije (1991). "O unijaćenju na teritoriji Srpske pravoslavne crkve" (PDF). Teološki pogledi. 24 (1–4): 131–146. Archived from the original (PDF) on 2020-10-01.
- Jevtić, Atanasije (2011). "Hristologija Sevira Antiohijskog nije pravoslavna" (PDF). Teološki pogledi. 44 (2): 47–54. Archived from the original (PDF) on 2020-10-19.
- Jevtić, Atanasije (2012). "Sveti Vaseljenski Sabori: Osmi (879–880. g.) i Deveti (1351. g.)" (PDF). Teološki pogledi. 45 (1): 69–90. Archived from the original (PDF) on 2020-09-11.

Eastern Orthodox Church titles
Preceded by Amfilohije (Radović)	Bishop of Banat; 1991–1992	Succeeded by Hrizostom (Stolić)
Preceded by Vladislav (Mitrović)	Bishop of Zahumlje and Herzegovina; 1992–1999	Succeeded by Grigorije (Durić)
