= Diocese of Central Europe =

Diocese of Central Europe may refer to:

- Antiochian Orthodox Diocese of Germany and Central Europe, a diocese (eparchy) of the Greek Orthodox Patriarchate of Antioch
- Bulgarian Orthodox Diocese of Western and Central Europe, a diocese (eparchy) of the Bulgarian Orthodox Church
- Romanian Orthodox Diocese of Germany and Central Europe, a diocese (eparchy) of the Romanian Orthodox Church
- Serbian Orthodox Diocese of Central Europe, former name of the Serbian Orthodox Eparchy of Frankfurt and all of Germany

== See also ==
- Diocese in Europe
- Diocese of Western Europe (disambiguation)
