= Dormition of the Theotokos Serbian Orthodox Monastery (Himmelsthür) =

Serbian Orthodox monastery near Hildesheim, Germany

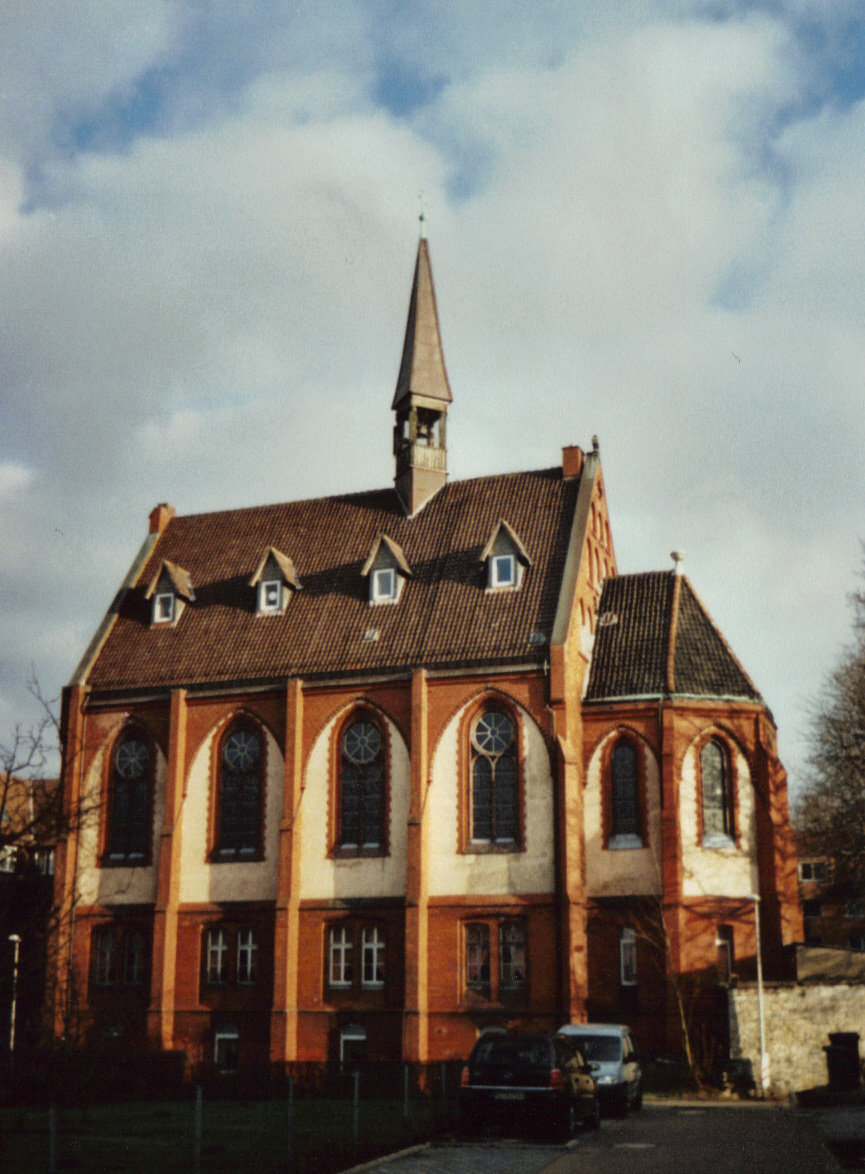
- Dormition of the Theotokos Serbian Orthodox Monastery, pictured in 2008
- Interactive map of Dormition of the Theotokos Serbian Orthodox Monastery

Monastery information
- Order: Serbian Orthodox Church
- Established: 1978
- Dedication: Dormition of the Mother of God
- Diocese: Serbian Orthodox Eparchy of Düsseldorf and Germany

Architecture
- Architect: Adelbert Hotzen
- Style: Neo-Gothic Saalkirche

Site
- Coordinates: 52.15889°N 9.90967°E

The Dormition of the Theotokos Serbian Orthodox Monastery (Serbian: Српски православни манастир Успењa Пресвете Богородице, romanized: Srpski pravoslavni manastir Uspenja Presvete Bogorodice; German: Kloster der Entschlafung der Gottesmutter) is an Eastern Orthodox Christian monastery located in Himmelsthür, Germany. It is under jurisdiction of the Serbian Orthodox Eparchy of Düsseldorf and Germany of the Serbian Orthodox Church.

It is the first Serbian Orthodox monastery in Germany and the spiritual point of ethnic Serb community in Germany. The parish near the monastery, which includes Hildesheim, Hameln, Goslar and Holzminden, has about 150 registered households, which help the monastery permanently or occasionally. The monastery often hosts church gatherings and symposiums, exhibitions of paintings and lectures. The Assembly of Serbian Youth of Western Europe is held regularly. It also has a workshop for making candles, and the whole complex is decorated with a gate with a tree line and a garden.

== History and architecture ==
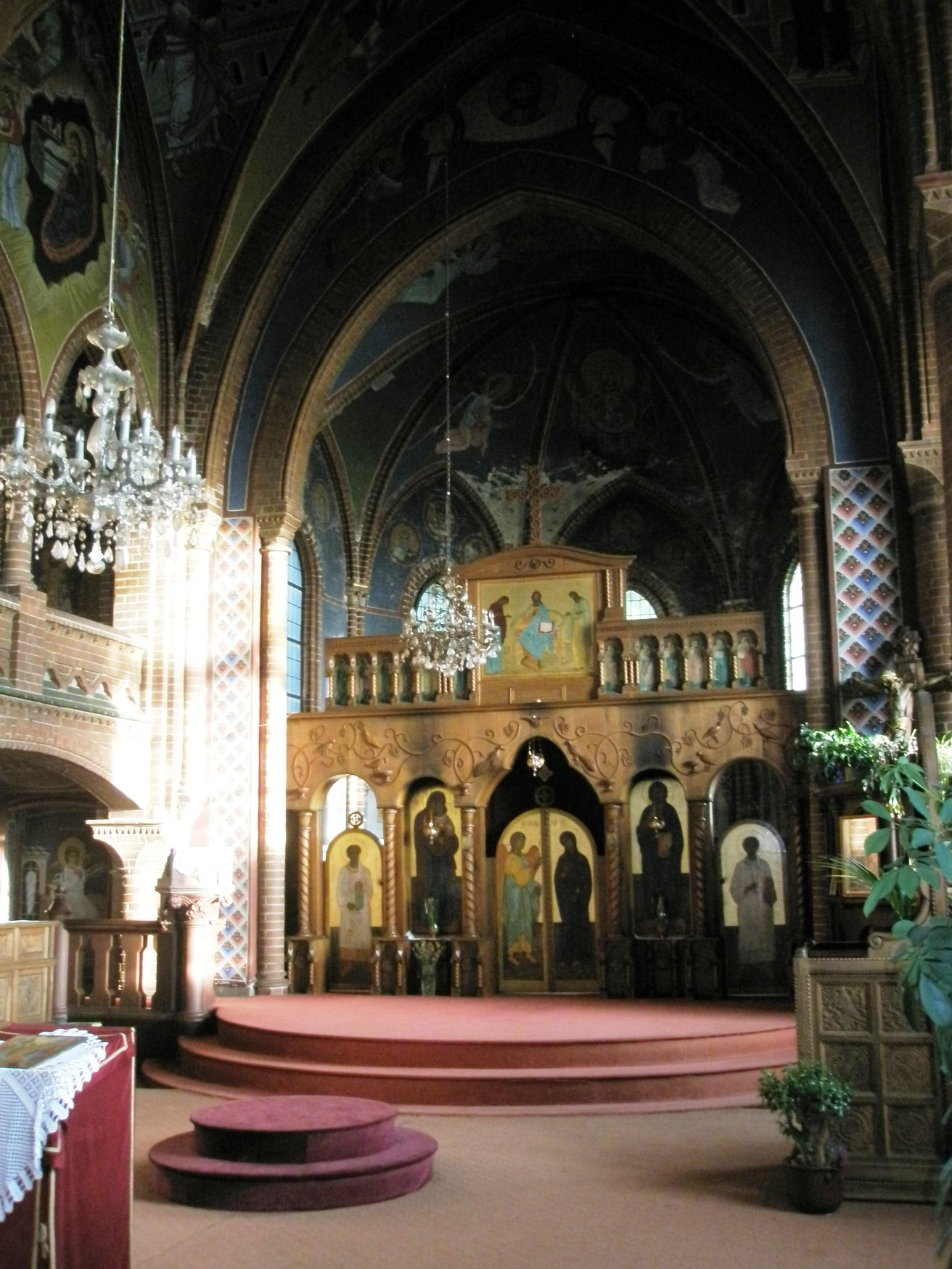
Interior of the monastery church

The church was built from 1902 to 1904 by Adelbert Hotzen built as a chapel of the Protestant church of Frauenheims Himmelsthür founded by Pastor Bernhard Isermeyer. It is a Neo-Gothic Brick-Saalkirche with a retracted polygonal closing chancel and roof turret. Under the church there are two basement floors, which originally served as ironing and sorting rooms for the diaconal facility. The last Protestant service was celebrated in the old asylum church in 1977.

In 1978, the Serbian Orthodox Eparchy of Central Europe bought the church and the adjoining buildings and set up their bishopric with a monastery there. After the redesign for the orthodox liturgy, especially the decoration with iconostasis, the church was consecrated to the Dormition of the Theotokos. In 1992, it also became parish church. In 2015, the monastery lost its status as an episcopal see to Saint Sava Cathedral in Düsseldorf.

== See also ==
- List of Serbian Orthodox monasteries
- Serbs in Germany
