= Grigorije Durić =

Serbian Orthodox bishop

His Eminence Grigorije Durić
- Metropolitan bishop
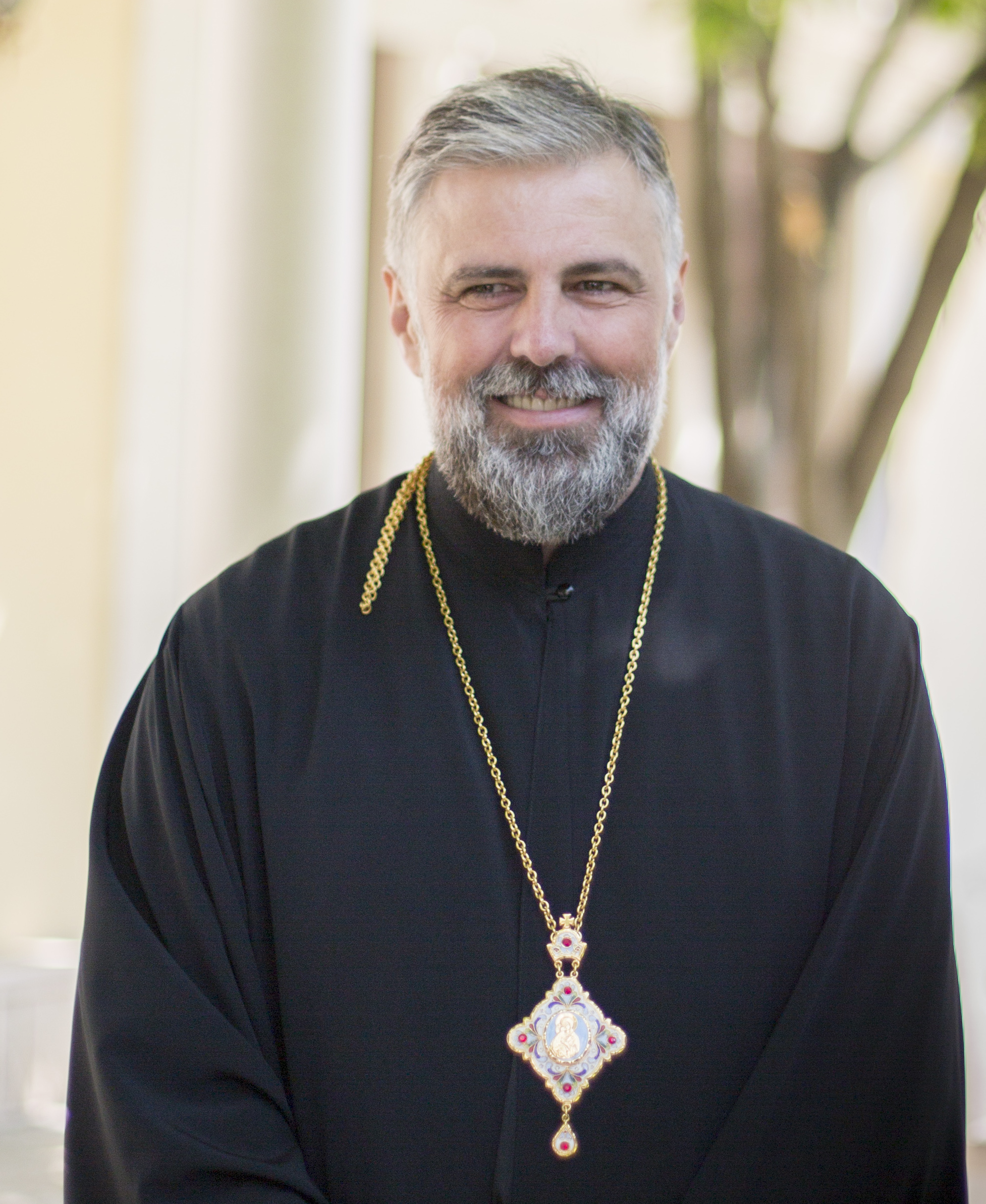
- Grigorije in 2014
- Church: Serbian Orthodox Church
- Diocese: Eparchy of Düsseldorf and Germany
- Installed: 16 September 2018
- Predecessor: Andrej Ćilerdžić
- Previous post: Bishop of Zachlumia, Herzegovina, and the Littoral (1999–2018)

Orders
- Ordination: 23 June 1992
- Consecration: 13 May 1999

Personal details
- Born: Mladen Durić; 17 December 1967 (age 58) Vareš, Bosnia and Herzegovina, Yugoslavia
- Denomination: Eastern Orthodoxy
- Education: Faculty of Theology, University of Belgrade

Grigorije Durić (Serbian Cyrillic: Григорије Дурић; born Mladen Durić; 17 December 1967) is a Serbian Orthodox archbishop who has been serving as the head of the Eparchy of Düsseldorf and Germany since 2018. He is a former head of the Eparchy of Zachlumia, Herzegovina, and the Littoral.

== Early life ==
Durić was born in Vareš, Bosnia and Herzegovina, Yugoslavia. He spent his childhood in the village of Planinica, where his family lived, originally from the Old Herzegovinian village of Banjani in the vicinity of Bilećko Lake.

Durić finished middle school and the Electronic School (so called at the time) also in Vareš. He enrolled in the Theological High School in 1984 and graduated in 1988 in Belgrade, after which he enrolled at the Faculty of Theology and then in 1989 went to serve his military service in Zagreb. As a student he participated in the 1992 protests against the president of Serbia, Slobodan Milošević.

== Career ==
Durić was ordained a monk on 23 June 1992 in the Ostrog Monastery, from where he went with Bishop Atanasije to the renovated Tvrdoš Monastery near Trebinje. He was ordained a hierodeacon on 17 July 1992 and a hieromonk on 19 August 1992. He became the abbot of Tvrdoš on 12 May 1996 and the archimandrite on 19 August 1997. He graduated from the Faculty of Theology in 1994, and from 1995 to 1997 he was in postgraduate studies in Athens.

At the regular session of the Council of Bishops of the Serbian Orthodox Church on 13–15 May 1999, Durić was elected vicar bishop of Hum in the Eparchy of Zachlumia, Herzegovina, and the Littoral. At the extraordinary session on 13–18 September 1999, after the withdrawal of Bishop Atanasije, Grigorije was elected to the acting diocesan bishop. He was enthroned as the bishop of Zahumlje and Herzegovina by the Metropolitan of Montenegro and the Littoral, Amfilohije on 3 October 1999, with the blessing of Patriarch Pavle.

Bishop Grigorije administered the Metropolitanate of Dabar and Bosnia from 2015 until 2017, and on several occasions he was a member of the Holy Synod of Bishops. At the regular session of the Holy Synod in May 2018, he was elected bishop of the Eparchy of Düsseldorf and Germany (today the Eparchy of Düsseldorf and Germany). He was enthroned on 16 September 2018 at the Saint Sava Cathedral in Düsseldorf. Since his arrival to Germany, the Serbian Orthodox Church has increasingly started doing services in German.

In 2014, Durić received his doctorate in theology from the Orthodox Theological Faculty in Belgrade. In 2017, he was appointed a member of the Senate of Republika Srpska for a seven-year term. He wrote the book Across the Threshold, for which he received the Kočić Pen Award in December 2017, as well as the Kočić Book Award.

== Views ==
Durić is an ecumenist. He is a strong critic of Serbian president Aleksandar Vučić, provoking hostility from the Serbian Orthodox Church and the media close to the government. In July 2020, he criticized the Serbian government for providing funds for the Temple of Saint Sava instead of funding hospitals during the COVID-19 pandemic. The Serbian Orthodox Church responded by accusing him of anti-clericalism and anti-Serbdom. In the midst of the anti-government protests in Serbia after the proposed reintroduction of the COVID-19 curfew, the deputy mayor of Belgrade, Goran Vesić, called him an inspirator of the protest, and he filed criminal charges against Grigorije for "incitement to murder".

== Orders and decorations ==
- Order of Njegoš, 2nd class
- Order of the Republika Srpska on sash

== Publications ==
Books written by Bishop Grigorije:

=== Theology ===
- "Dolazi čas i već je nastao" (The Moment Is Coming and It's Already Here), 2004
- "Biti sa drugim: Relaciona ontologija Jovana Zizjulasa" (Being with the Other: Relational Ontology of John Zizioulas), 2018

=== Fiction ===
- "Priča o starom kralju" (Story of an Old King), 2009 (novel)
- "Vera, radost života" (Faith, the Joy of Life), 2010 (novel)
- "Lazar", 2010 (novel)
- "Preko praga" (Across the Threshold), 2017 (novel)
- "Gledajmo se u oči" (Let's Keep the Eye Contact), 2019 (book of interviews)
- Nebeska dvorišta (2022)
- Stranac u šumi (2024)
- Jedni drugima potrebni (2026)

Serbian Orthodox Church titles
Preceded by Atanasije Jevtić	Bishop of Zahumlje and Herzegovina; 1999 – 2018	Succeeded by Dimitrije Rađenović
Preceded by Sergije Karanović	Bishop of Düsseldorf and all of Germany; 2018 – present	Incumbent
