= Diocese of Western Europe =

The term Diocese of Western Europe or Eparchy of Western Europe may refer to:

- Serbian Orthodox Diocese of Western Europe, a diocese (eparchy) of the Serbian Orthodox Church
- Antiochian Orthodox Diocese of France and Western Europe, a diocese (eparchy) of the Greek Orthodox Patriarchate of Antioch
- Assyrian Church of the East Diocese of Western Europe, a diocese of the Assyrian Church of the East
- Bulgarian Orthodox Diocese of Western and Central Europe, a diocese (eparchy) of the Bulgarian Orthodox Church
- Georgian Orthodox Diocese of Western Europe, a diocese (eparchy) of the Georgian Orthodox Church
- Russian Orthodox Diocese of Geneva and Western Europe, a former diocese (eparchy) of the Russian Orthodox Church Outside of Russia, now merged into the Russian Orthodox Diocese of Great Britain and Western Europe
- Patriarchal Exarchate in Western Europe, an exarchate of the Russian Orthodox Church

== See also ==
- Western Europe
- Diocese of Central Europe (disambiguation)
