= Konstantin Grcic =

German industrial designer (born 1965)

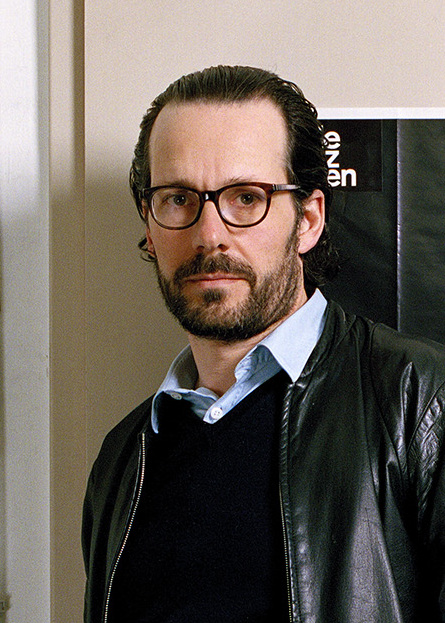
- Konstantin Grcic by Oliver Mark, Munich 2010
- Born: 1965 (age 60–61); Munich, West Germany
- Occupation: Industrial designer
- Known for: Functional designs, geometric shapes, simplicity and high tech materials
- Notable work: Chair_ONE, Mayday lamp, MIURA stool
- Website: http://konstantin-grcic.com

Konstantin Grcic (Serbian: Константин Грчић / Konstantin Grčić; born 1965) is a German industrial designer known for his design of furniture and household products, some of which have been featured in design shows and museums. His design language is characterized by the use of geometric shapes and unexpected angles.

== Early life and education ==
Grcic was born in Munich, West Germany, in 1965, to a Serbian father and German mother, and grew up in Wuppertal. His father, born in Belgrade, then in the SFR Yugoslavia, collected 18th-century art, and his mother was an art dealer. As a child, Grcic was surrounded by art and loved to build things, and during high-school he restored furniture.

Grcic studied cabinetry making in the Arts and Crafts tradition at the John Makepeace School for Craftsmen in Wood in Parnham House, Beaminster, Dorset, starting in 1985. in 1988, he began his graduate studies in Industrial Design at London's Royal College of Art. Grcic worked with British designer Jasper Morrison as a studio assistant in the late 1980s until 1990, when he began designing furniture for SCP, one of London's largest design stores. He credits his time in London for helping develop his individual style, describing his time in England as "stirring his creative potential."

== Career ==
=== Portfolio ===
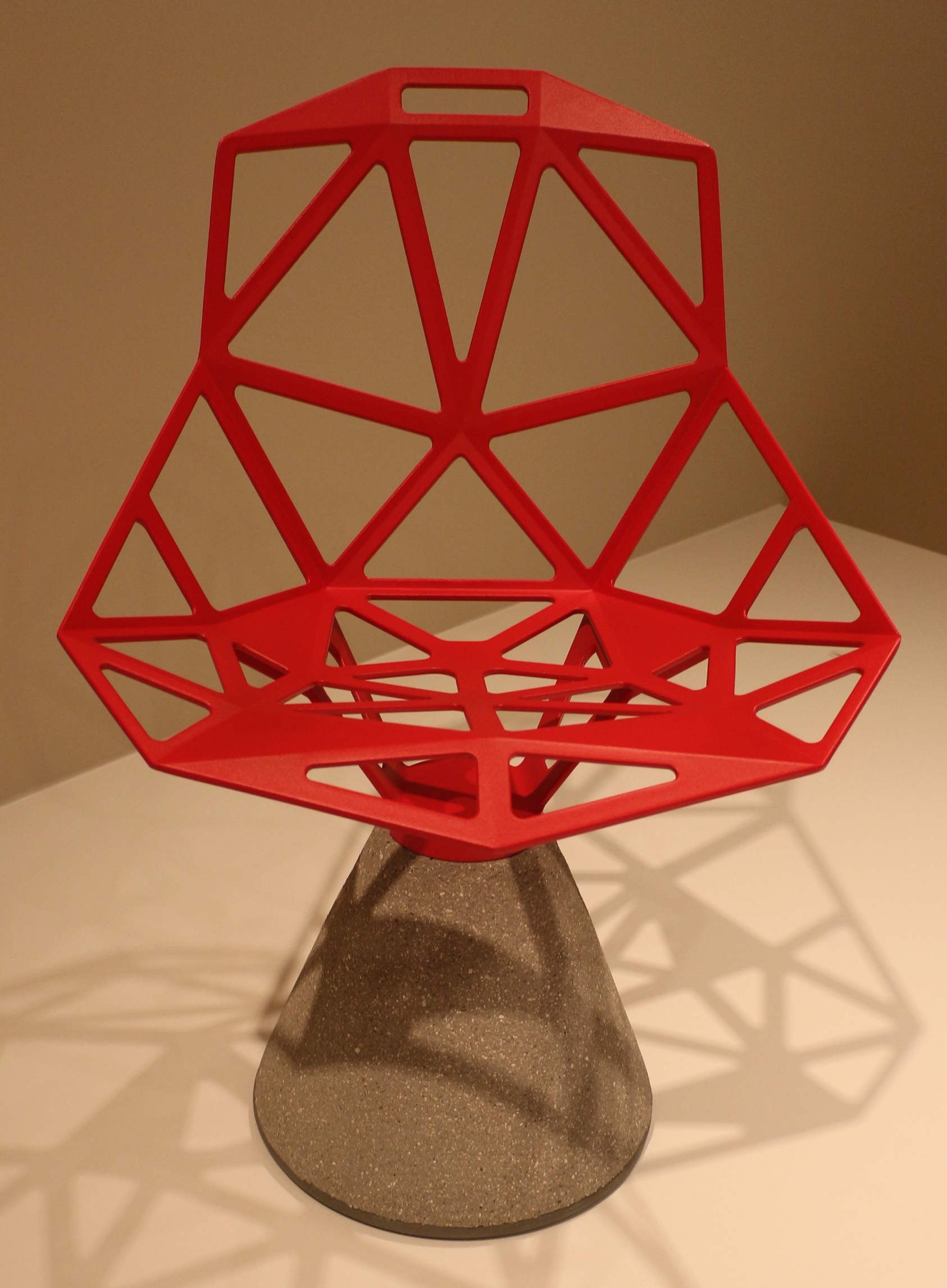
Chair_One for Magis (2004)

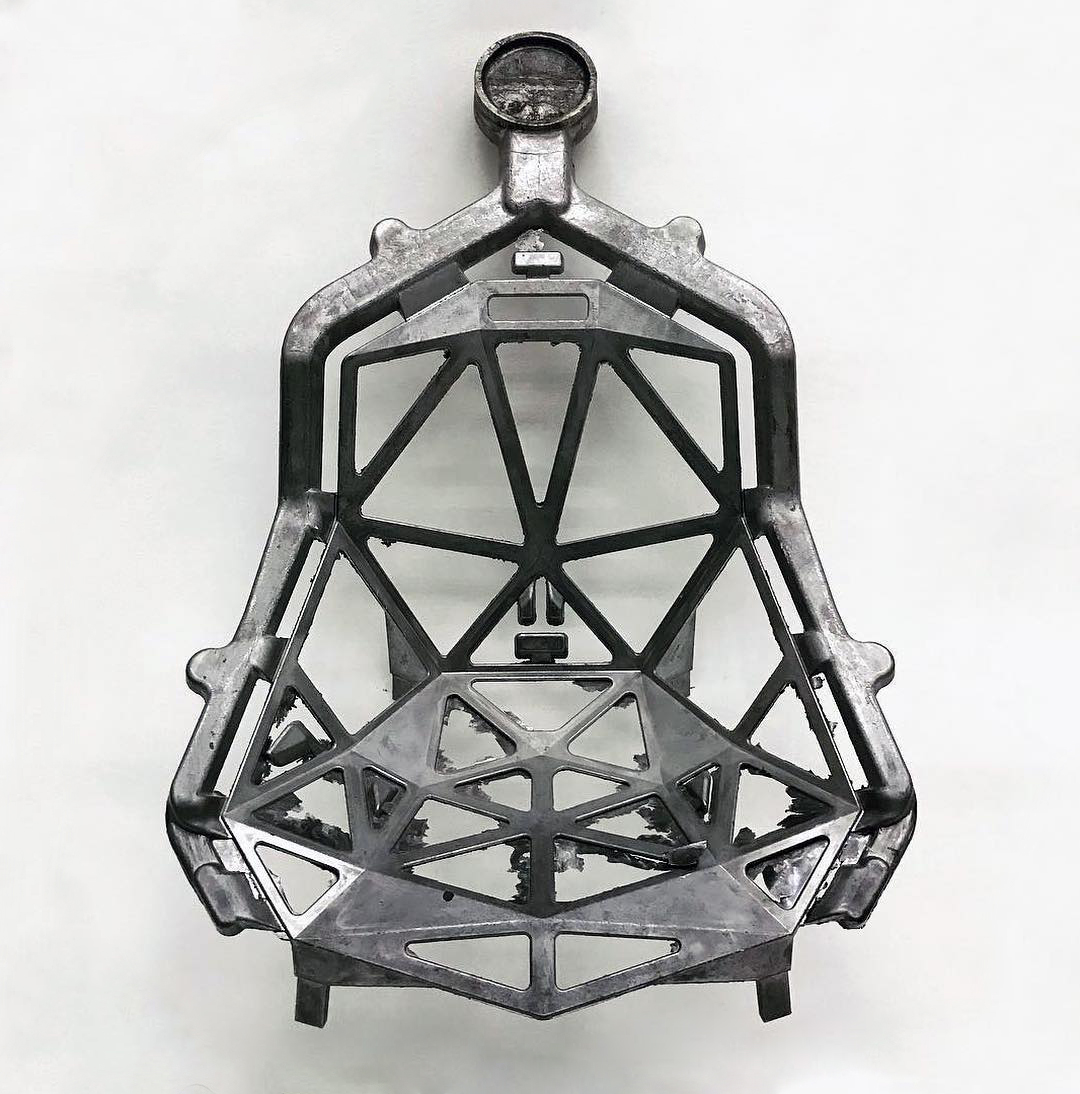
Chair_One (process image)

In 1991, Grcic founded his studio, "Konstantin Grcic Industrial Design" (KGID), in Munich, Germany. Working with a staff of five, he creates "pieces that have been described as both revolutionary and intelligent." According to The New York Times, he has a "rigorous focus on logic, utility and simplicity."

Grcic is known for having a spartan and functional approach to design, relying on geometric forms, unusual angles and hard edges. He has created installations and developed products such as furniture, lighting, watches, tableware, espresso makers, and umbrellas. Grcic became recognized for his 1995 Refolo trolley, 1997 Wanda dish rack, 1998 award-winning Mayday lamp, 1999 ES shelf and 2001 Chaos chair.

His 2004 Chair_One and 2006 Miura stool are both described as being comfortable to sit on, despite their oddly shaped compositions. Grcic has a philosophical approach to design, especially when it comes to seating products, his favourite objects to tackle, "Designing chairs touches issues of society, how we live...How life changes – that’s most interesting."

He has used cutting edge technology, such as high-tech ceramics and 3D modeling software, to create his mass-produced items. Advanced engineering plastics were the basis of his award-winning Myto Chair, launched at the Milan Furniture Fair in 2008. Grcic also relies on low-tech solutions to advance the design process, manually creating and deconstructing rough paper models. An engineering-oriented approach and extensive research make up his methodology; this has been attributed to his German upbringing.

His furniture and lighting designs, including the OK pendant light and the Noctambule lighting series, combine functional minimalism with distinctive visual detailing.

=== Exhibits and media ===
In 2009, the Chicago Art Institute held a retrospective of Grcic's work. Zoë Ryan, who curated the exhibit, states that the designer "is very mindful of how we interact with and use objects." In 2014, a Grcic exhibition of fictional products was showcased at the Vitra Design Museum in Weil am Rhein, Germany. His design pieces are also found in the permanent collections of the MoMA in New York City and the Centre Georges Pompidou in Paris. In 2019, his work was exhibited at Design Miami and in 2021, it was announced he would collaborate with Cake, a motorbike manufacturer from Sweden.

In 2005, London's Phaidon Press published the first book examining Grcic's body of work. Other publications include monographs accompanying his museum exhibitions. He is also the subject of various design books like "How to Design a Chair", as well as "Chroma: Design, Architecture and Art in Color" where he mentions how the Lego color palette has inspired him. A film about Grcic's developmental process was screened at "A Design Film Festival 2017" held in Singapore.

=== Related activities ===
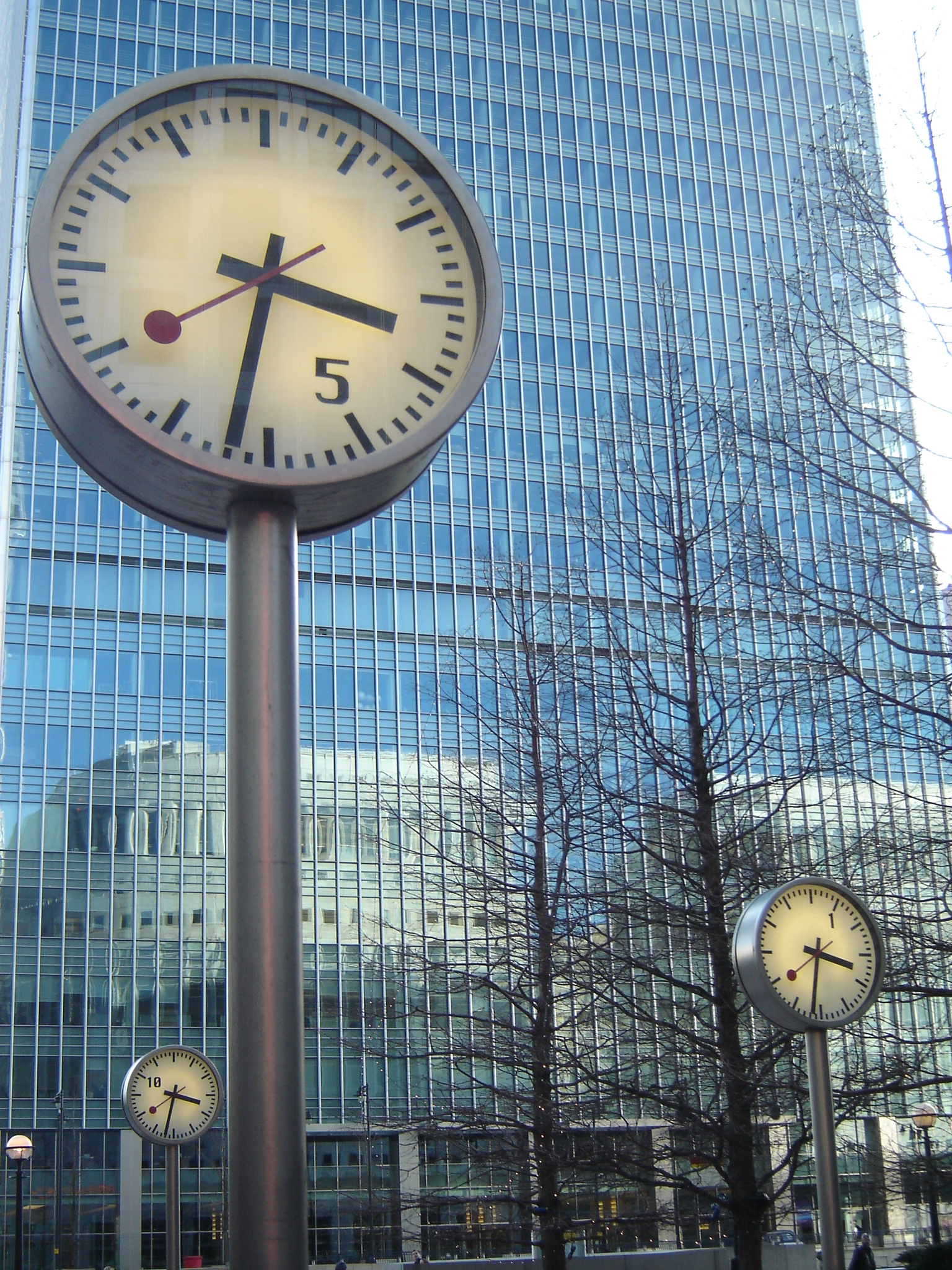
Six Public Clocks by Grcic, Reuters Plaza, Canary Wharf, London (1983)

In 2009, Grcic curated an exhibition called "Design Real" at the Serpentine Gallery in London, England. He selected products with a practical function, from well known and lesser known designers, which reflected the first ten years of the millennium. In 2010, he curated two shows, one for France's "St. Etienne Design Biennale" and the other for the Istituto Svizzero (Swiss Institute) in Rome.

Grcic has also participated in design initiatives happening in Belgrade, Serbia, such as speaking at "Belgrade Design Week" or sitting on the juries of the "Mikser Festival" and the "University of Arts in Belgrade" final year competition. Concerning the burgeoning design scene in Serbia's capital city, Grcic has said,"I was not sure what to expect but I encountered a fantastic atmosphere and amazing people." The 2014 retrospective exhibition on Grcic's work, Panorama, held at the Vitra Design Museum, featured the installation Life Stage. Life Stage was a fictitious product meant as a mobile power source made of the eco-friendly resin Acrodur.

== Awards and honours ==
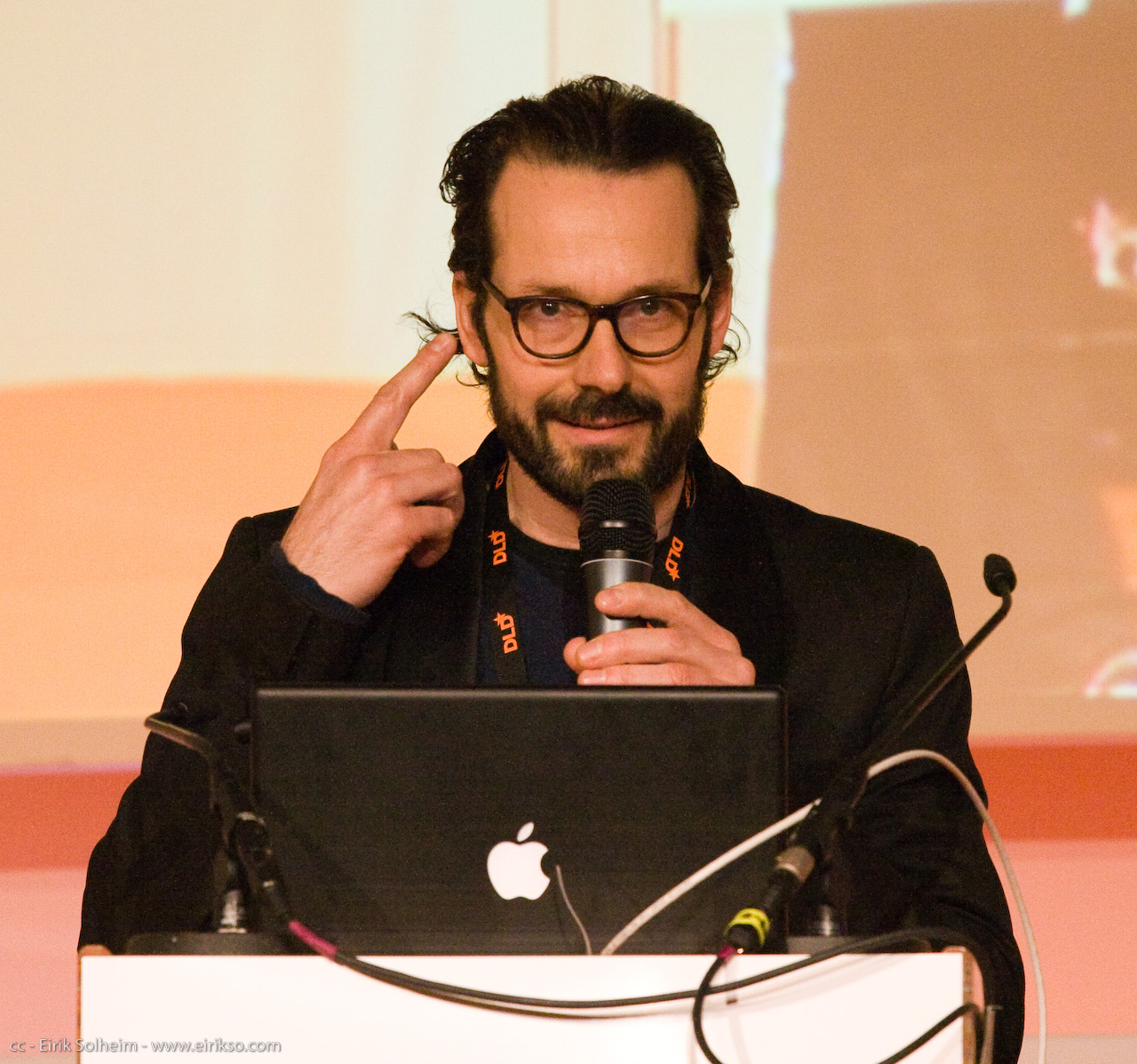
Konstantin Grcic (2008)

In 2001, Grcic received a "Compasso d'Oro" award for his Mayday lamp. He won another "Compasso d'Oro" in 2011 for his Myto chair. He won two "Designpreis Deutschland" prizes, from the Government of Germany, for his Chair_ONE and Miura stool in 2006 and 2007 respectively. In 2006, his Miura stool also received a "Best of the Best" Red Dot award and an IF Design Award.

In 2010, Grcic was named "Designer of the Year" at Design Miami, where he also created an installation consisting of seating made with polypropylene netting. In 2016, Dezeen magazine listed him as number 14 on their list of top 100 designers, based on the 48 articles written about him. That same year he also received the "Best Designer of the Year" award at the Salone del Mobile in Milan.

In 2014 his Parrish chair for Emeco received the iF Design Award.
