= Serbs in Germany =

Ethnic group

Serben in Deutschland Срби у Немачкој Srbi u Nemačkoj
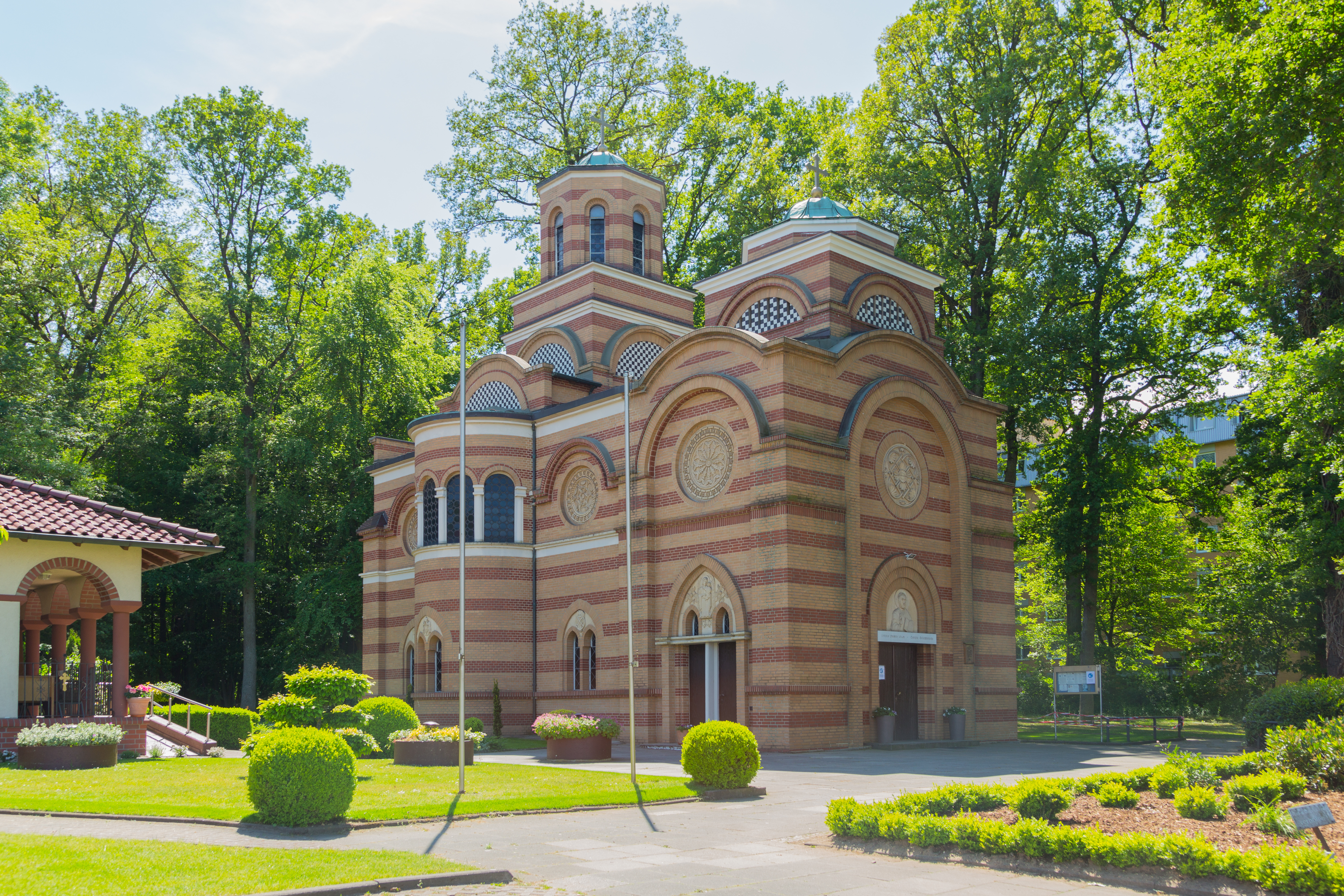
- Saint George Serbian Orthodox Church in Osnabrück

Total population
- 272,690 Serbian citizens (2024) ~387,000 of Serb ancestry (2023)

Regions with significant populations
- North Rhine-Westphalia, Baden-Württemberg, Bavaria, Hessen, Lower Saxony, Berlin

Languages
- German and Serbian

Religion
- Eastern Orthodoxy (Serbian Orthodox Church)

Related ethnic groups
- Serbs in Austria, Serbs in Switzerland

Serbs in Germany are German citizens of ethnic Serb descent and Serbian citizens living in Germany. According to data from 2024, there were 272,690 Serbian citizens in Germany, while estimated number of people of Serb ethnic descent stands at around 387,000, representing the largest group within the global Serb diaspora.

== History ==
Serbian immigration to Germany began during the 1960s and 1970s when Germany's Gastarbeiter ("guest worker") program attracted many laborers from Yugoslavia, including ethnic Serbs.

The foundations of the modern Serbian community in Germany were laid during West Germany’s Wirtschaftswunder ("economic miracle"). Devastated by war and facing acute labor shortages, the West Germany turned to southern Europe for workers. In 1968, West Germany and Yugoslavia signed the Belgrade Treaty, the first bilateral labor recruitment agreement between a NATO-aligned state and a non-aligned communist country: Germany needed labor for its factories; Yugoslavia needed hard currency remittances to fund its industrialization.

Serbs formed a significant portion of the Yugoslav migrant stream, though official statistics recorded them simply as "Yugoslavs". Most came from rural Serbian regions with high unemployment and strong traditions of seasonal labor migration. Recruitment offices in Belgrade, Niš, and Kragujevac processed thousands of young men, often with only primary education, promising two-year contracts in auto plants, steelworks, and construction. They concentrated in industrial corridors: the Ruhr (Essen, Duisburg, Dortmund), Baden-Württemberg (Stuttgart, Mannheim), and Bavaria (Munich). Companies like Volkswagen, Opel, ThyssenKrupp, and Siemens became synonymous with Yugoslav-labor. Workers lived in factory dormitories, wages were modest by German standards but transformative back home.

In 1965, the Serbian Orthodox Church in Düsseldorf consecrated Saint Sava Church in the first permanent Serbian parish in Germany. Weekend gatherings, slava celebrations, folk dances, and choir practices, became vital for preserving identity in an alien industrial landscape.

The 1973 oil crisis and subsequent recession abruptly ended active recruitment. The Chancellor Willy Brandt’s government imposed a freeze on new guest worker visas. But rather than triggering mass return, it accelerated permanent settlement. Workers already in Germany were allowed to extend contracts, and crucially, family reunification became possible under a new legislation. This marked a profound demographic shift as wives and children arrived, transforming single-male enclaves into family communities. By 1980, the Yugoslav population in Germany had significantly grown, with a growing second-generation born in Germany. Children attended German schools but maintained Serbian language and culture through weekend supplementary schools (dopunska škola), often held in Serbian Orthodox churches. The first such school opened in Cologne in 1977, followed by others in Hamburg, Berlin, and Frankfurt. Radio programs in Serbo-Croatian, such as WDR’s "Yugoslav Hour", broadcast news, music, and call-ins, linking diaspora to Yugoslavia.

The violent breakup of Yugoslavia in the 1990s brought another wave of Serbian migration to Germany. Germany, bound by its liberal asylum laws, became the primary destination. Many entered on tourist visas and applied for Duldung ("tolerated stay") or asylum. The German government, overwhelmed, introduced the "safe third country" rule and restricted benefits, but family ties built over decades facilitated chain migration. This wave was different than the one in 1960s and 1970s: more urban and educated.

== Demographics ==
Serbian citizens in Germany, numbering 232,252 according to data from the 2022 census, are heavily concentrated (72%) in four federal states: North Rhine-Westphalia, Baden-Württemberg, Bavaria, and Hesse. Major hubs of Serbian immigration include Frankfurt, Düsseldorf, Cologne, Berlin, Munich, and Stuttgart.

People with Serbian ancestry (including Serbian citizens born in Germany and all persons born in Germany as German citizens with at least one Serbian parent who migrated to Germany or was born in Germany as a Serbian citizens) are currently estimated to number around 387,000, forming the 15th largest ancestry group in the country.

Map of districts by population of Serbian citizens

State		Serbian citizens (2022)
Flag of North Rhine-Westphalia	North Rhine-Westphalia	60,391
Flag of Baden-Württemberg	Baden-Württemberg	42,983
Flag of Bavaria	Bavaria	38,139
Flag of Hesse	Hesse	28,271
Flag of Lower Saxony	Lower Saxony	18,451
Flag of Berlin	Berlin	15,019
Flag of Rhineland-Palatinate	Rhineland-Palatinate	7,739
Flag of Hamburg	Hamburg	6,143
Flag of Bremen (state)	Bremen	3,604
Flag of Schleswig-Holstein	Schleswig-Holstein	3,052
Flag of Saxony	Saxony	2,006
Flag of Thuringia	Thuringia	1,609
Flag of Saxony-Anhalt	Saxony-Anhalt	1,570
Flag of Brandenburg	Brandenburg	1,379
Flag of Saarland	Saarland	1,247
Flag of Mecklenburg-Vorpommern	Mecklenburg-Vorpommern	646

City	Serbian citizens (2022)
Frankfurt (incl. Offenbach am Main)	18,670
Düsseldorf	18,450
Cologne	15,627
Berlin	15,019
Munich	12,340
Stuttgart	10,210
Nuremberg	7,627
Mannheim	5,931
Essen	3,774
Bremen	3,604
Hanover	2,748
Mainz	2,639
Gelsenkirchen	2,582
Duisburg	2,488
Oberhausen	2,090
Bielefeld	2,037

Serbs in Germany predominantly belong to the Eastern Orthodoxy with the Serbian Orthodox Church as the traditional church. There is Serbian Orthodox diocese, the Serbian Orthodox Eparchy of Düsseldorf and Germany, encompassing over 30 parishes across Germany with 18 churches as well as monastery in Hildesheim.

== Notable people ==
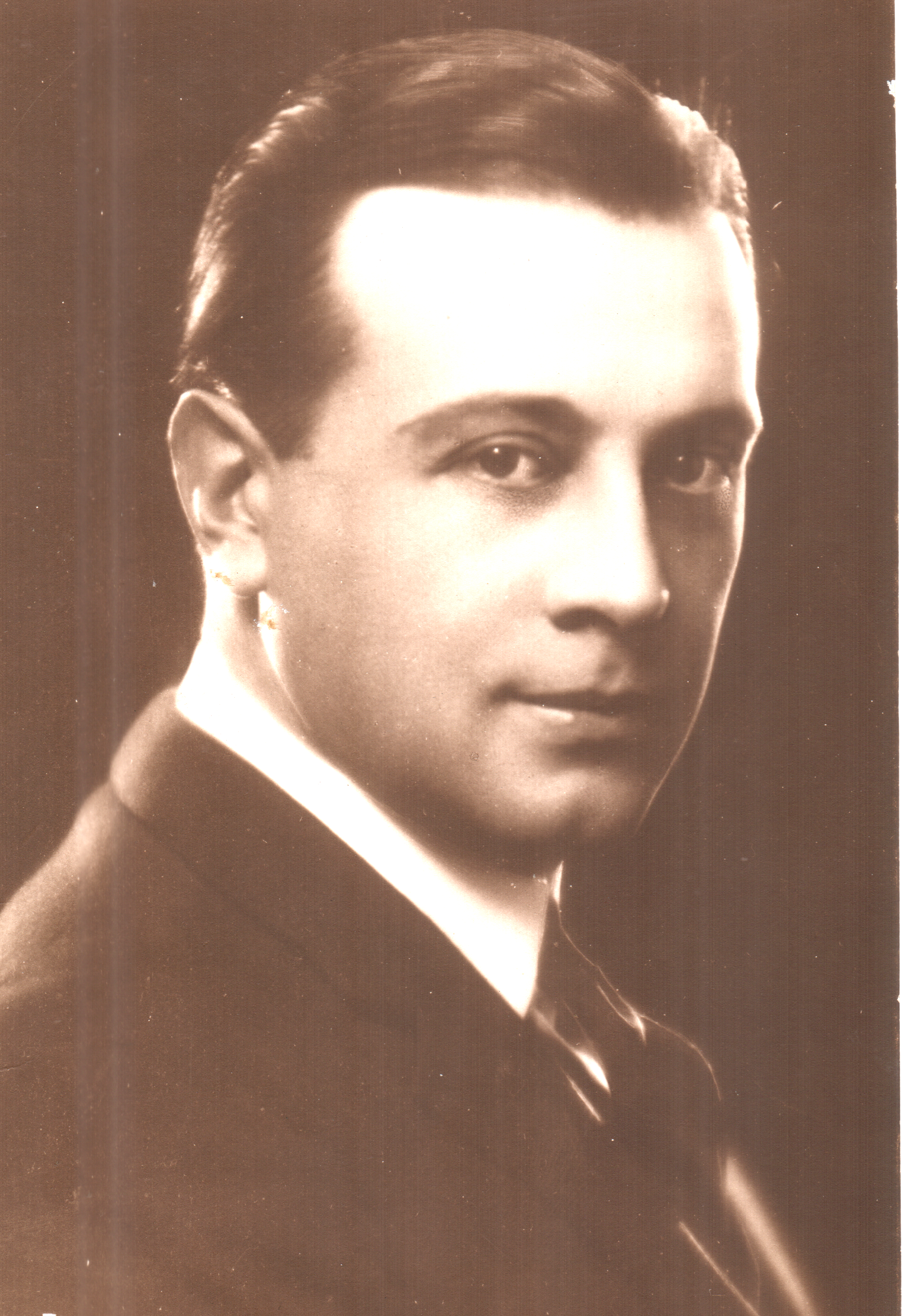
Iván Petrovich

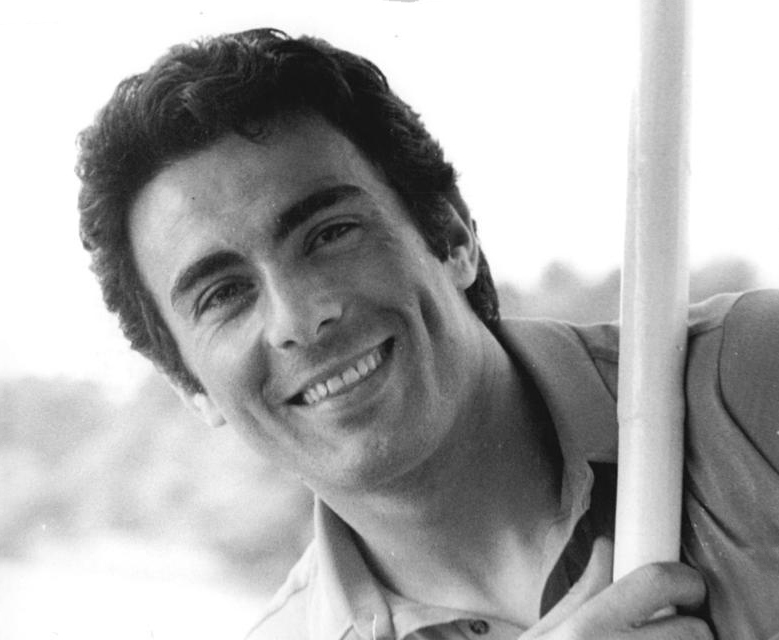
Gojko Mitić

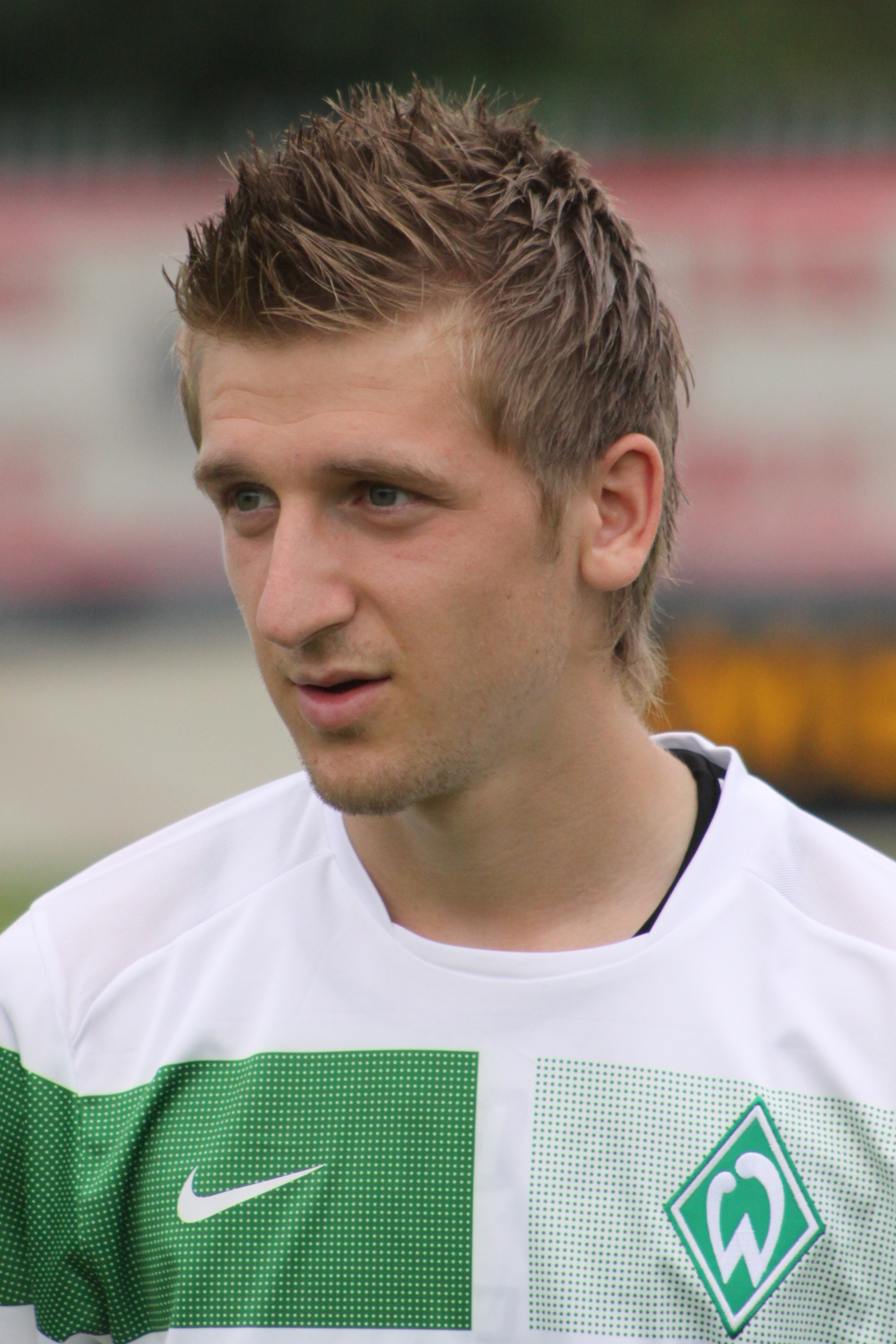
Marko Marin

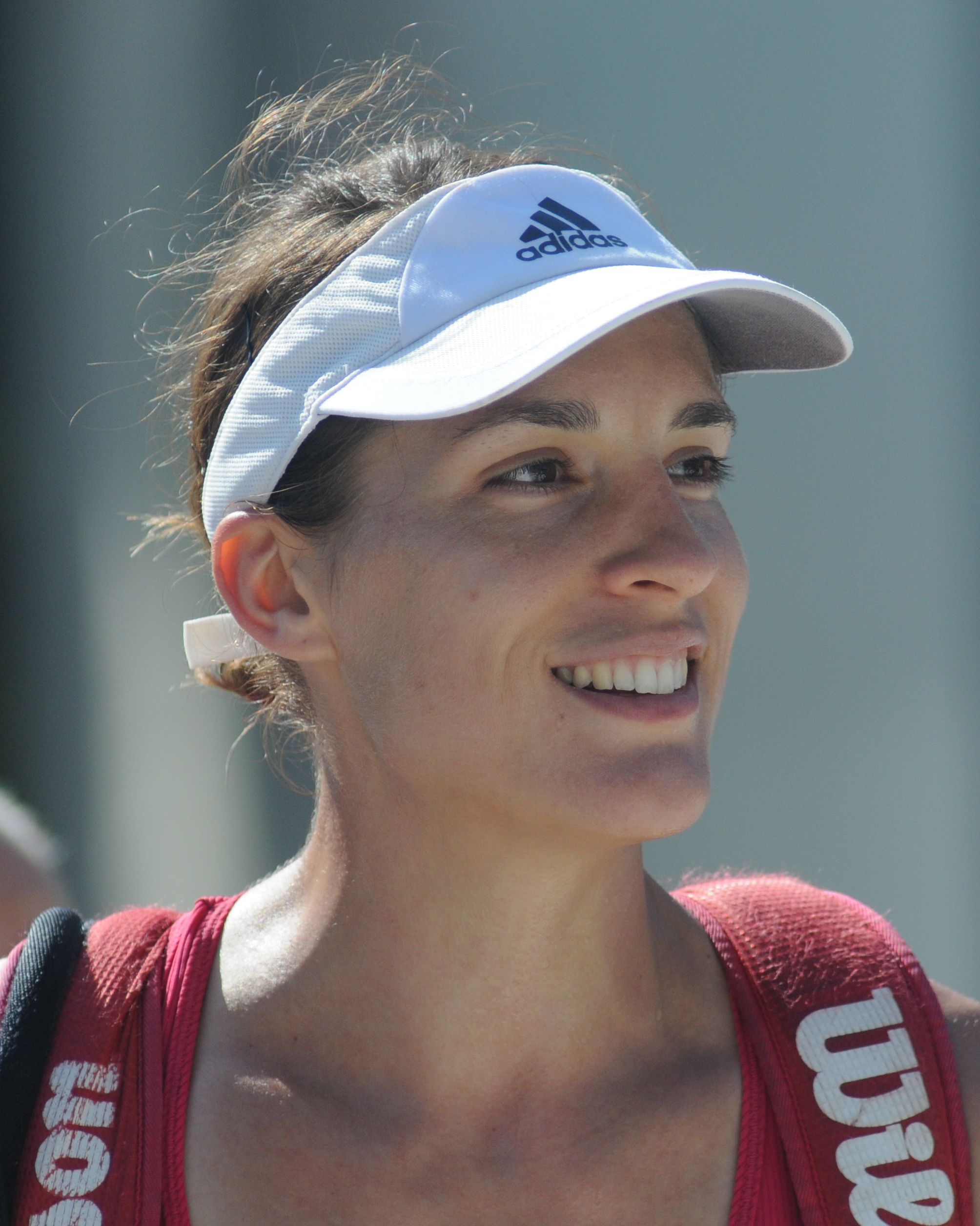
Andrea Petkovic

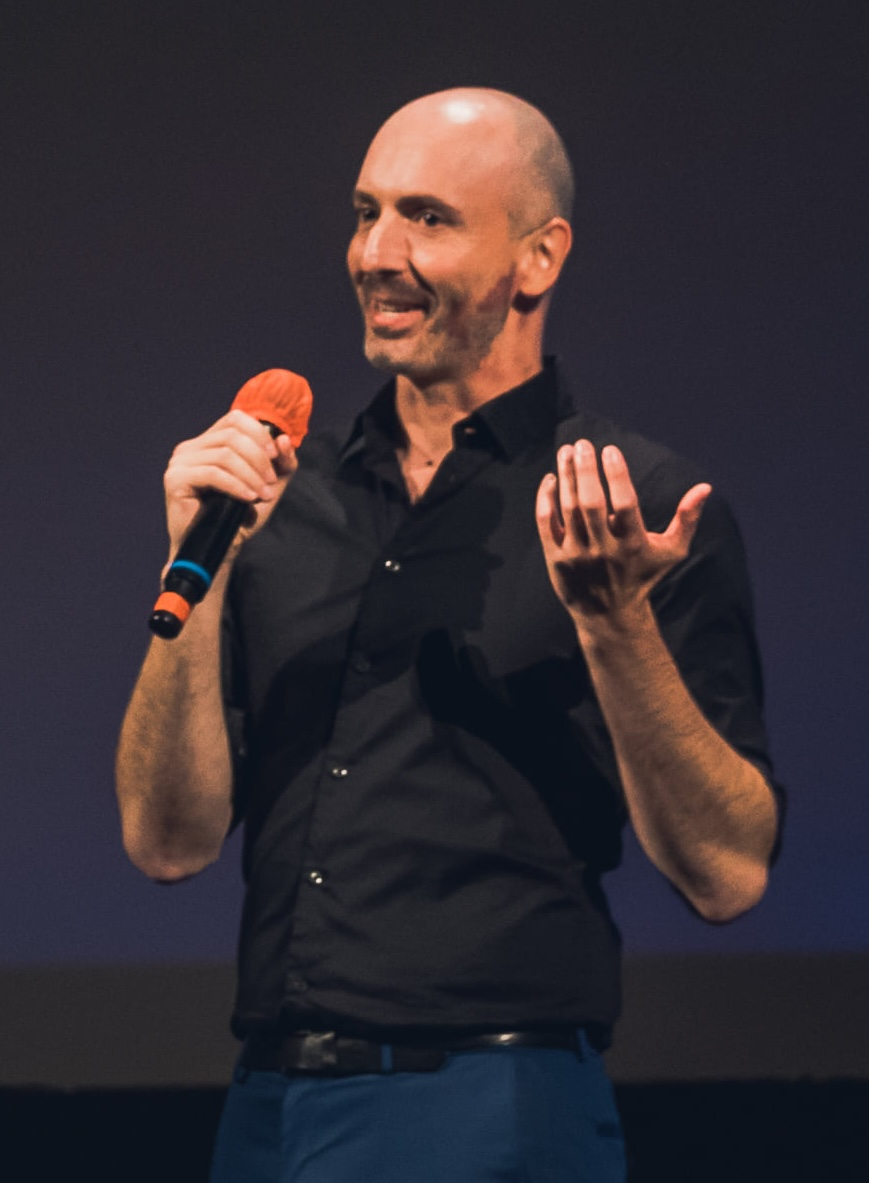
Branko Tomović

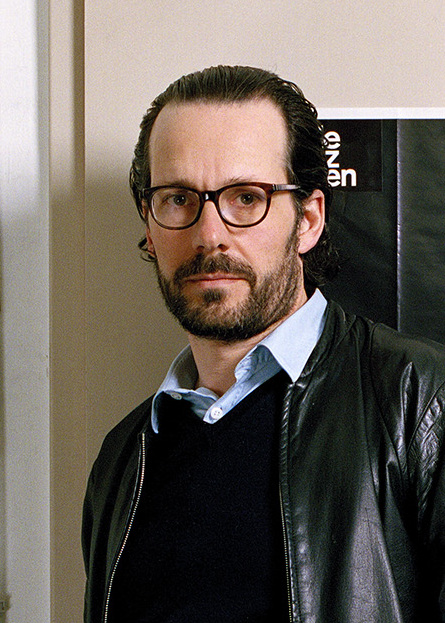
Konstantin Grcic

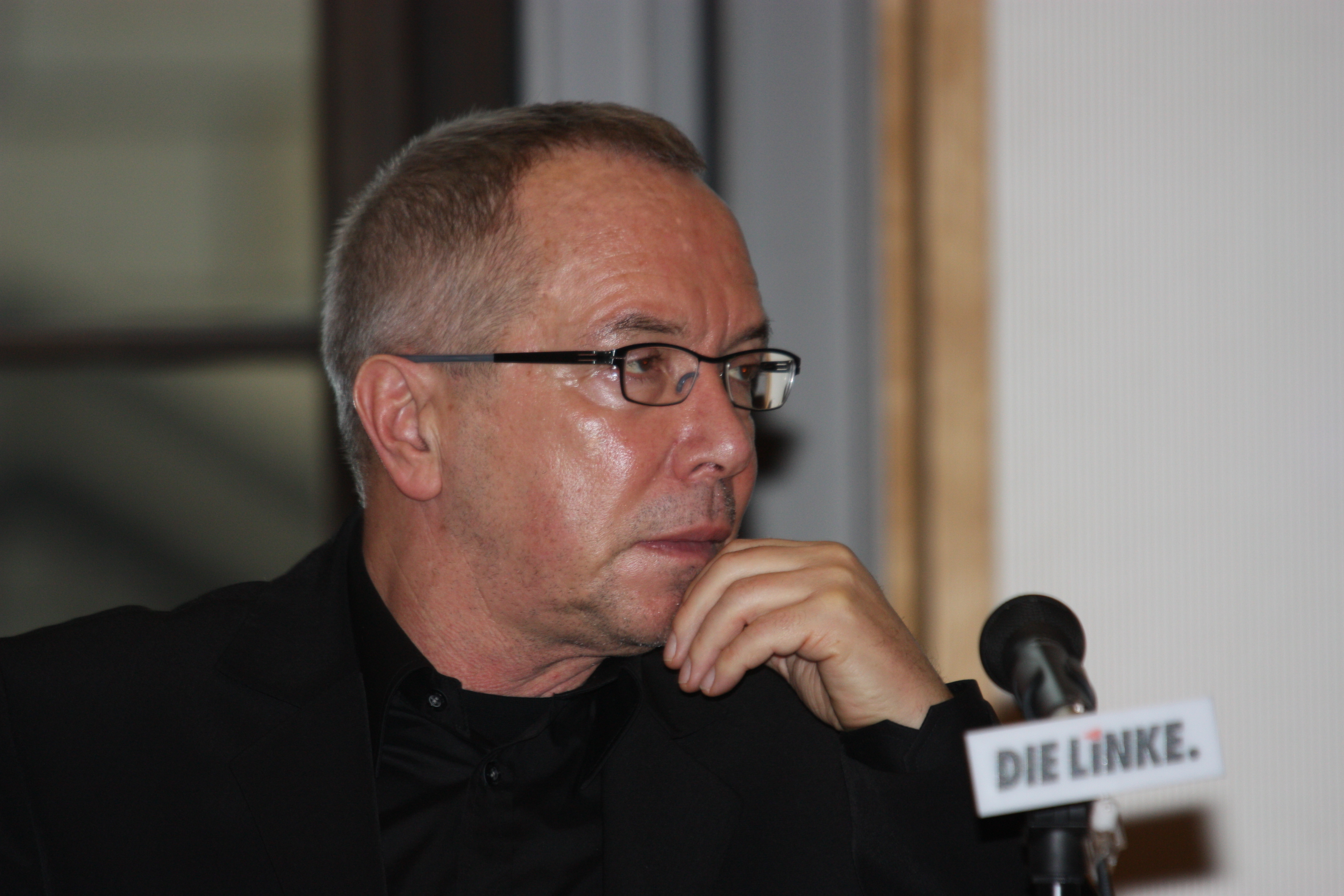
Wolfgang Nešković

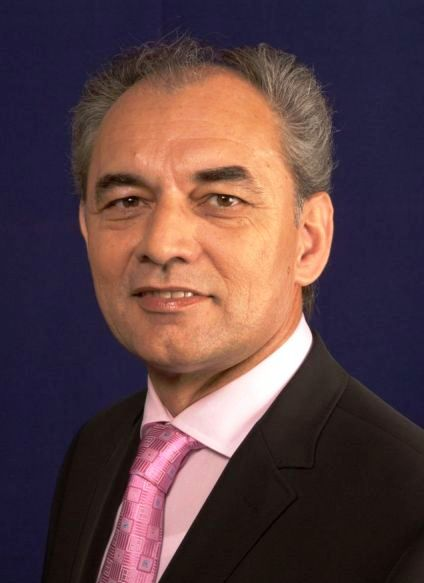
Dejan Ilić

- Marko Djurdjević – illustrator
- Konstantin Grcic – industrial designer
- Dejan Ilić – scientist
- Slobodan Komljenović – football player
- Marko Marin – football player
- Marijana Marković – fencer, Olympic medalist
- Tamara Milosevic – documentary filmmaker
- Gojko Mitić – actor
- Wolfgang Nešković – politician
- Aleksandar Pavlović – football player
- Andrea Petkovic – tennis player
- Iván Petrovich – actor
- Michael Rensing – football player
- Emilio Sakraya – actor
- Lazar Samardžić – football player
- Branko Tomović – actor

== See also ==
- Immigration to Germany
- Serb diaspora
- Germany–Serbia relations
- Serbian Orthodox Eparchy of Düsseldorf and Germany
