= Brdarica =

- Village (Selo)
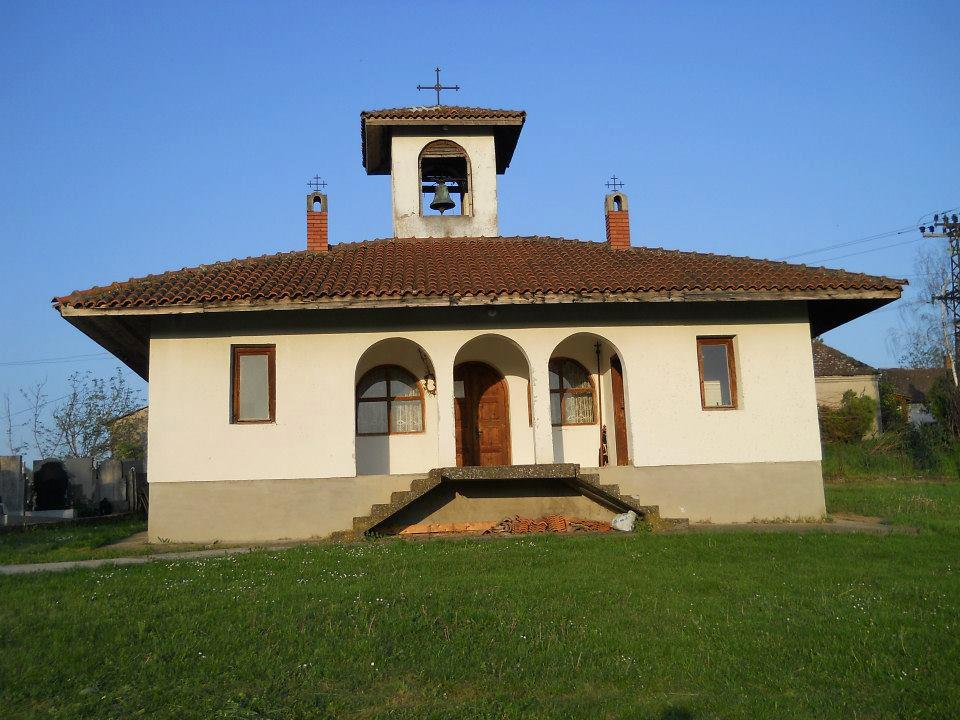

- Location within Serbia
- Coordinates: 44°33′12″N 19°46′14″E
- Country: Serbia
- Municipality: Koceljeva
- Time zone: UTC+1 (CET)
  - Summer (DST): UTC+2 (CEST)

Brdarica (Serbian Cyrillic: Брдарица) is a village in Serbia. It is situated in the Koceljeva municipality, in the Mačva District of Central Serbia. The village had a Serb ethnic majority and 1,519 inhabitants in 2002. There is a large Romani minority in the village numbering 488 persons or about one third of the population.

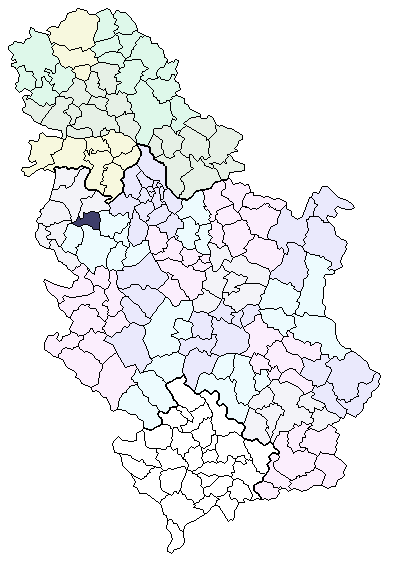
Location of the Koceljeva municipality in Serbia

== Historical population ==
- 1948: 1,603
- 1953: 1,710
- 1961: 1,753
- 1971: 1,675
- 1981: 1,690
- 1991: 1,618
- 2002: 1,519
- 2011: 1,180

== Notable people ==
- Atanasije Jevtić (1938–2021), Serbian Orthodox bishop and theologian

== See also ==
- List of places in Serbia
