= Order of the Republika Srpska =

Order of the Republika Srpska Орден Републике Српске
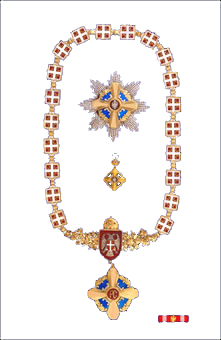
- Order of Republika Srpska on necklace
- Type: State order
- Awarded for: Merits to Republika Srpska
- Presented by: Republika Srpska
- Eligibility: Heads of state Prominent individuals
- Status: Currently awarded
- Established: 1993
- First award: 1993

Highlights
- Total: Unknown
- Ribbon bar Sash of the Order

Precedence
- Next (higher): None
- Next (lower): Order of Nemanjići

The Order of the Republika Srpska (Serbian: Орден Републике Српске, romanized: Orden Republike Srpske) is the Republika Srpska's highest award. It can be awarded to any head of state, "exceptional person", or institution in recognition of "excellent work strengthening the national consciousness [regarding] the fight for freedom", or to persons who made significant contributions to the creation of the Republika Srpska. The award was established on April 25, 1993 by an order of the National Assembly of Republika Srpska. The medal may be awarded on a necklace or strips with the order star worn on the breast. The right to grant the award is the sole privilege of the President of Republika Srpska.

The order can be awarded in three forms; the Order insignia, the Order necklace, and the Order star.

== Recipients ==
=== Order of Republika Srpska on necklace ===
- 2023 - (Hungary) Viktor Orbán (by Milorad Dodik, President of Republika Srpska)
- 2023 - (Russia) Vladimir Putin (by Milorad Dodik, President of Republika Srpska)
- 2018 - (Russia) Sergey Lavrov (by Milorad Dodik, President of Republika Srpska)
- 2018 - (Russia) Valentina Matviyenko (by Milorad Dodik, President of Republika Srpska)
- 2018 - (Serbia) Aleksandar Vučić (by Milorad Dodik, President of Republika Srpska)
- 2009 - (Serbia) Serbian Patriarch Pavle (by Rajko Kuzmanović, President of Republika Srpska)
- 1994 - (Serbia and Montenegro) Slobodan Milošević (by Radovan Karadžić, President of Republika Srpska)

=== Order of Republika Srpska on sash ===
- 2022 - (Serbia) Ivica Dačić (by Željka Cvijanović, President of Republika Srpska)
- 2021 - (Austria) Peter Handke (by Željka Cvijanović, President of Republika Srpska)
- 2019 - (Serbia) Ana Brnabić (by Željka Cvijanović, President of Republika Srpska)
- 2018 - (Russia) Georgy Poltavchenko (by Milorad Dodik, President of Republika Srpska)
- 2018 - (Austria) Heinz-Christian Strache
- 2018 - (Serbia) Tomislav Nikolić (by Milorad Dodik, President of Republika Srpska)
- 2013 - (Serbia) Novak Djokovic (by Milorad Dodik, President of Republika Srpska)
- 2013 - (Serbia) Military Medical Academy
- 2012 - (Israel) Arie Livne
- 2012 - (Serbia) Vojislav Koštunica (by Milorad Dodik, President of Republika Srpska)
- 2012 - (Serbia) Boris Tadić (by Milorad Dodik, President of Republika Srpska)
- 2012 - (Bosnia and Herzegovina) Dragan Čavić
- 2012 - (Bosnia and Herzegovina) Grigorije Durić
- 2012 - (Bosnia and Herzegovina) Mirko Šarović
- 2012 - (Bosnia and Herzegovina) Nikola Poplašen
- 2012 - (Bosnia and Herzegovina) Rajko Kuzmanović
- 2011 - (Serbia) Serbian Patriarch Irinej (by Milorad Dodik, President of Republika Srpska)
- 2009 - (Bosnia and Herzegovina) Milorad Dodik
- 1994 - (Republika Srpska) Radovan Karadžić
- 1994 - (Republika Srpska) Ratko Mladić
- 1994 - (Republika Srpska) Momčilo Krajišnik
- 1994 - (Republika Srpska) Biljana Plavšić
- 1994 - (Republika Srpska) Nikola Koljević

== See also ==
- Orders, decorations and medals of Republika Srpska
