= Serbian Orthodox Eparchy of Düsseldorf and Germany =

Diocese of the Serbian Orthodox Church

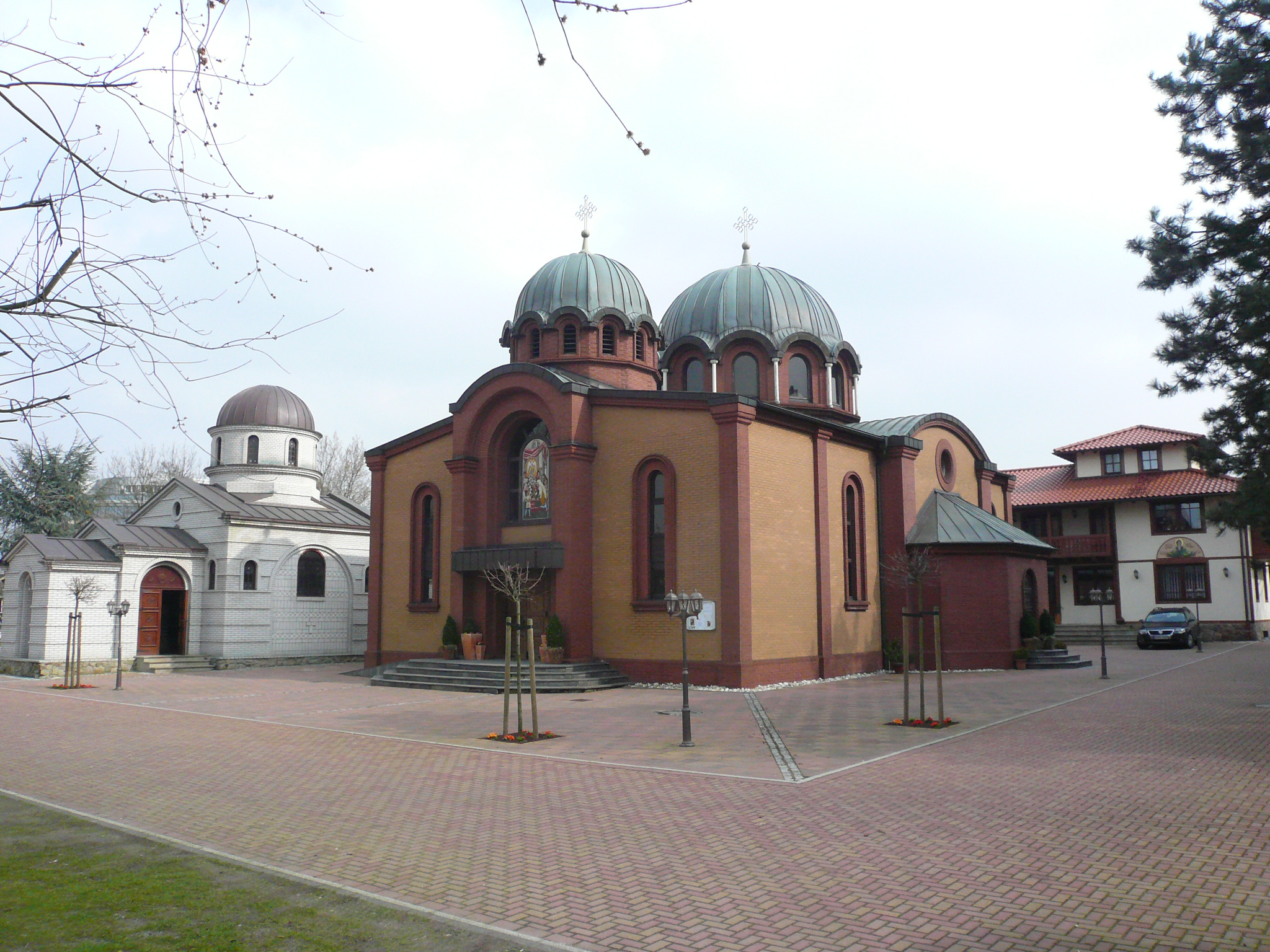
- Saint Sava Cathedral, Düsseldorf

Location
- Territory: Germany
- Headquarters: Düsseldorf, North Rhine-Westphalia

Information
- Denomination: Eastern Orthodox
- Sui iuris church: Serbian Orthodox Church
- Established: 1990 (as Central Europe); 2015 (as Frankfurt and all of Germany); 2024 (as Düsseldorf and Germany)
- Cathedral: Saint Sava Cathedral, Düsseldorf
- Language: Church Slavonic, Serbian, German

Current leadership
- Bishop: Grigorije Durić

Map

Website
- Serbian Orthodox Eparchy of Düsseldorf and Germany

The Serbian Orthodox Eparchy of Düsseldorf and Germany (Serbian: Српска православна епархија диселдорфска и немачка, romanized: Srpska pravoslavna eparhija diseldorfska i nemačka; German: Serbische Orthodoxe Diözese von Düsseldorf und Deutschland) is a diocese (eparchy) of the Serbian Orthodox Church, covering Germany.

== History ==
First Serbian Orthodox parishes in Germany, those in Hamburg and in Hanover, were established in the years after the World War II. Labor migration has brought tens of thousands of ethnic Serbs to Germany in the 1960s. To meet their religious needs, the Eparchy of Western Europe was established in 1969. Initially, it covered all states west of the Iron Curtain and, until 1973, also included Australia. The Serbian community in Germany was particularly large, leading to the founding of numerous additional church communities as well as the Monastery of the Dormition of the Theotokos in Hildesheim, Lower Saxony, which served as the episcopal seat from 1979. In 1990, the Eparchy of Western Europe was divided and two new eparchies were established: the Eparchy of Britain and Scandinavia (based in Stockholm, Sweden) and the Eparchy of Central Europe (based in Hildesheim-Himmelsthür, Germany) which encompassed the remaining Western European countries. In 1991, the protosingelos and former professor at the seminary of Sremski Karlovci, Konstantin (Đokić), was elected and ordained as the first bishop of the eparchy. Over time, the eparchy underwent several territorial changes. In 1994, jurisdiction over Italy was transferred to the Metropolitanate of Zagreb and Ljubljana; jurisdiction over France, the Benelux countries, and Spain were assigned to the newly founded Eparchy of Western Europe based in Paris. In 2011, jurisdiction over Austria and Switzerland were transferred to the separate Eparchy of Austria and Switzerland. In 2012, then-Bishop Konstantin Đokić was suspended as Bishop of the Eparchy and Serbian Patriarch Irinej assumed temporary administrative leadership of the eparchy until 2014 when Archimandrite Sergije Karanović was elected as new Bishop of Central Europe. In 2015, the diocese was officially renamed the Serbian Orthodox Eparchy of Frankfurt and all of Germany. From 2017 until Bishop Grigorije Durić took office, Andrej Ćilerdžić, Bishop of the Eparchy of Austria and Switzerland, headed the eparchy as administrator. In 2018, the previous bishop of the Eparchy of Zachlumia, Herzegovina, and the Littoral was appointed as the new bishop of Frankfurt and all of Germany. By a synodal decision in November 2018, the diocese was renamed the Eparchy of Düsseldorf and Germany. In 2019, the eparchy celebrated its 50th anniversary.

== Structure ==
The Serbian Orthodox Eparchy of Düsseldorf and Germany comprises over 30 eparchies. The episcopal see is located at the Saint Sava Cathedral in Düsseldorf.

The diocese operates, among others, churches in following cities and towns:

- Hamburg
- Cologne
- Munich
- Augsburg
- Regensburg
- Wuppertal
- Kassel
- Villingen-Schwenningen
- Mannheim
- Wiesbaden
- Berlin
- Ulm
- Stuttgart
- Karlsruhe
- Nuremberg
- Osnabrück

== Gallery ==
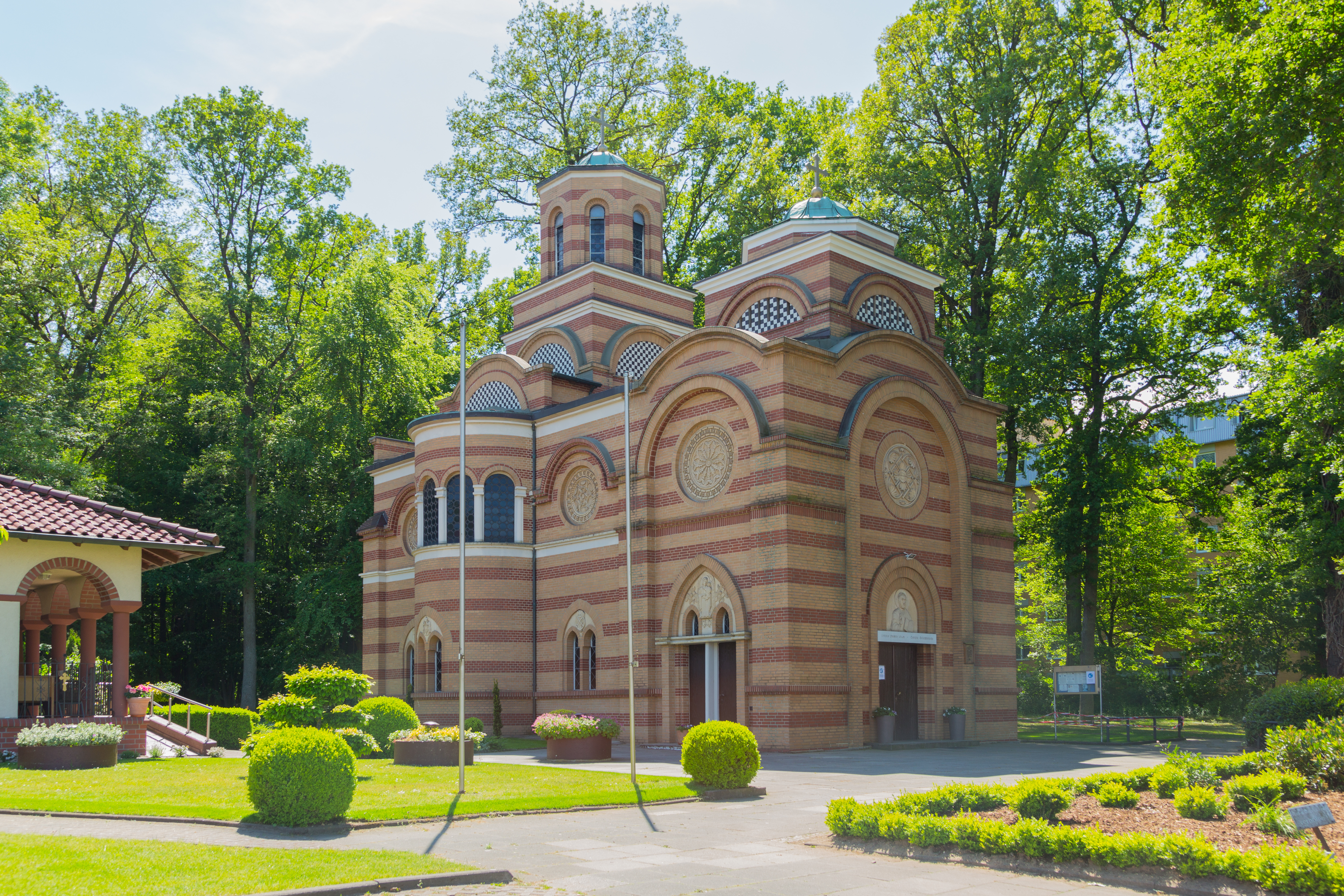
Saint George Church (Osnabrück)

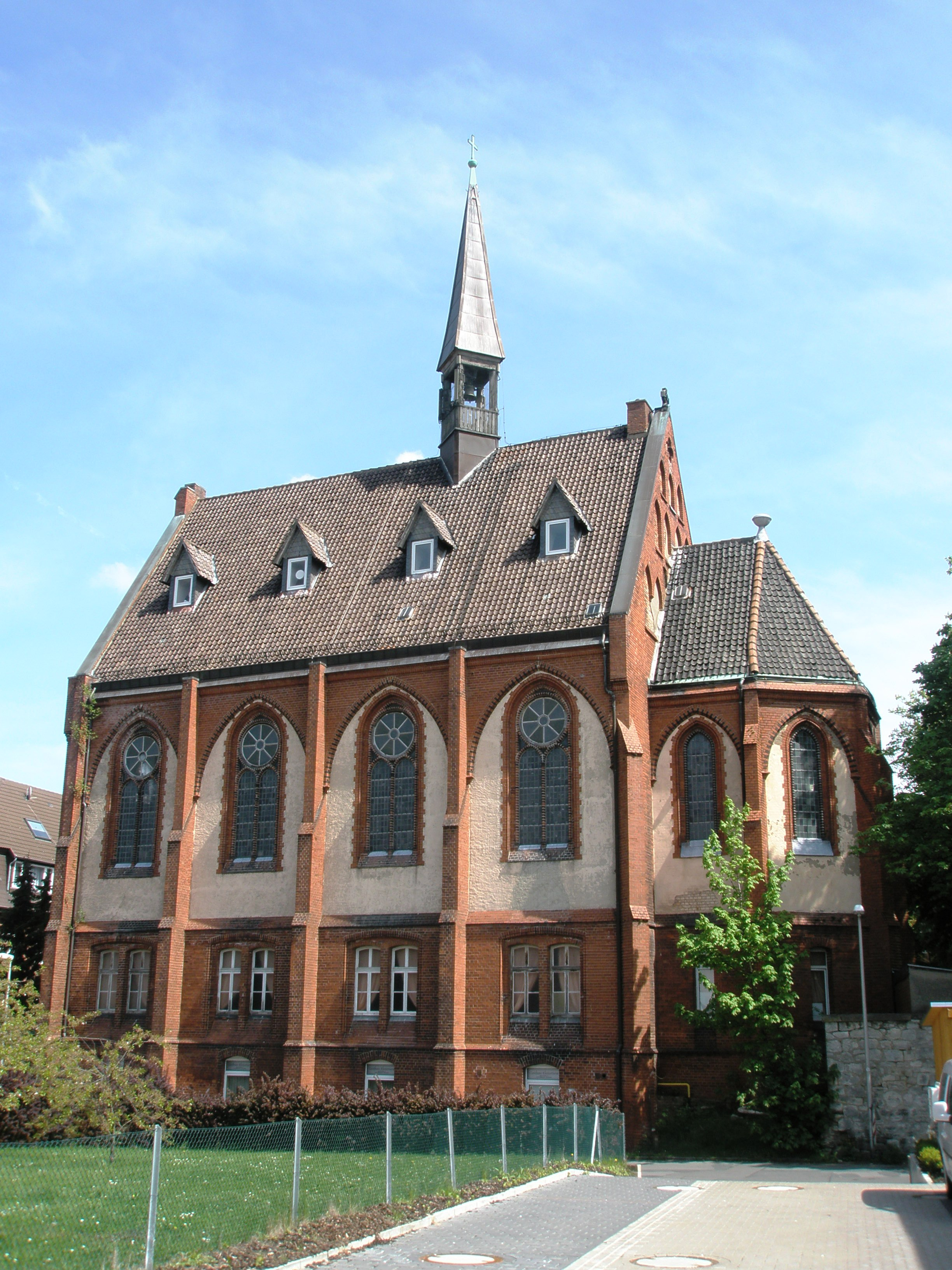
Dormition of the Theotokos Monastery (Hildesheim)

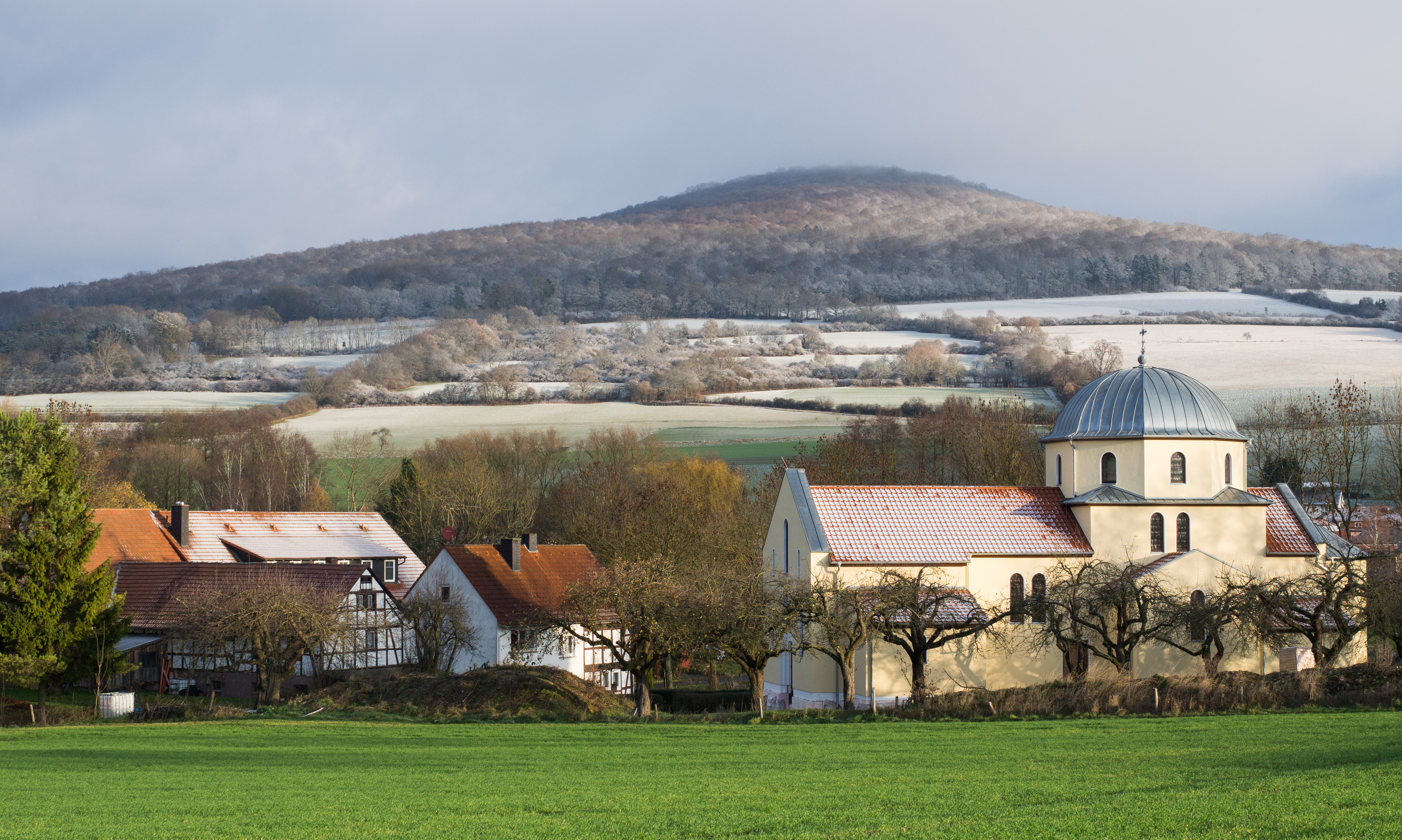
Saint Justin of Ćelije Monastery (Eiterfeld)

== See also ==
- Eastern Orthodox Church in Germany
- Assembly of Canonical Orthodox Bishops of Germany
- Eparchies and metropolitanates of the Serbian Orthodox Church
- Serbs in Germany
