= Tvrdoš Monastery =

Serbian Orthodox monastery near Trebinje, Bosnia and Herzegovina

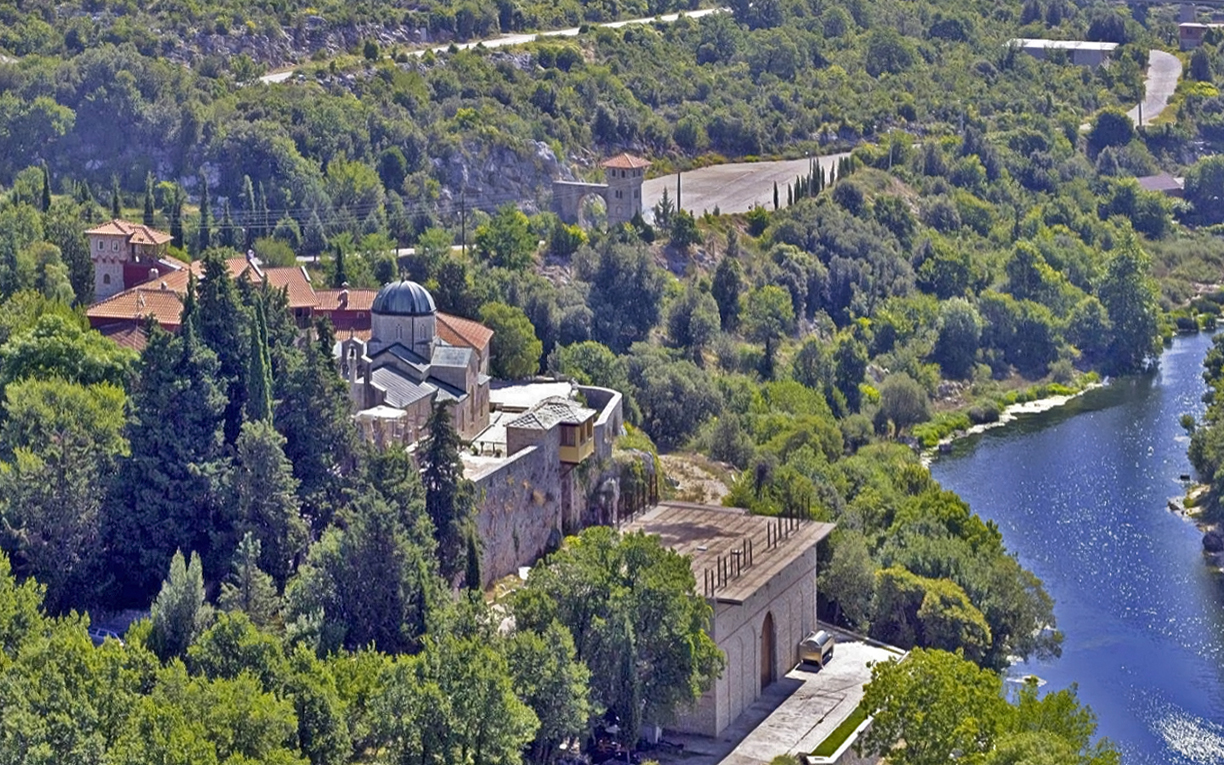

- Location within Bosnia and Herzegovina
- Interactive map of Tvrdoš Monastery

Monastery information
- Order: Serbian Orthodox Church
- Established: Late 15th/early 16th century
- Diocese: Eparchy of Zachlumia, Herzegovina, and the Littoral

Architecture
- Heritage designation

KONS of Bosnia and Herzegovina
- Official name: "Tvrdoš Monastery - Provisional list (1763)".
- Type: Category II cultural monument
- Criteria: Tentative List
- Reference no.: 1763
- Status: Tentative/Provisional List of National Monuments of Bosnia and Herzegovina

Site
- Location: Trebinje, Republika Srpska, Bosnia and Herzegovina
- Coordinates: 42.7186°N 18.2967°E

The Tvrdoš Monastery (Serbian: Манастир Тврдош, romanized: Manastir Tvrdoš) is a 15th-century Serbian Orthodox monastery near the town of Trebinje, Republika Srpska, Bosnia and Herzegovina. It was established at the end of the 15th or in the early 16th century.

== History ==
The monastery was established at the end of the 15th or in the early 16th century. The monastery remained a seat of the archbishops of Herzegovina until the Venetian overseas dominion destroyed it in 1694. The current monastery building was constructed in 1924. Today, the monastery is renowned for its wine production (in particular from the local Vranac and Žilavka grape varieties) and its wine cellars, one of which dates to the 15th century, which are a popular tourist attraction.

In 2021, the retired Bishop of Zachlumia, Herzegovina, and the Littoral (1992–1999), Atanasije Jevtić was buried at the Chapel of the Resurrection of the Lord in the cemetery of the monastery.

== National monument provisional list ==
As of May 2026, the monastery remains on the KONS's Provisional List of National Monuments of Bosnia and Herzegovina.

== Gallery ==
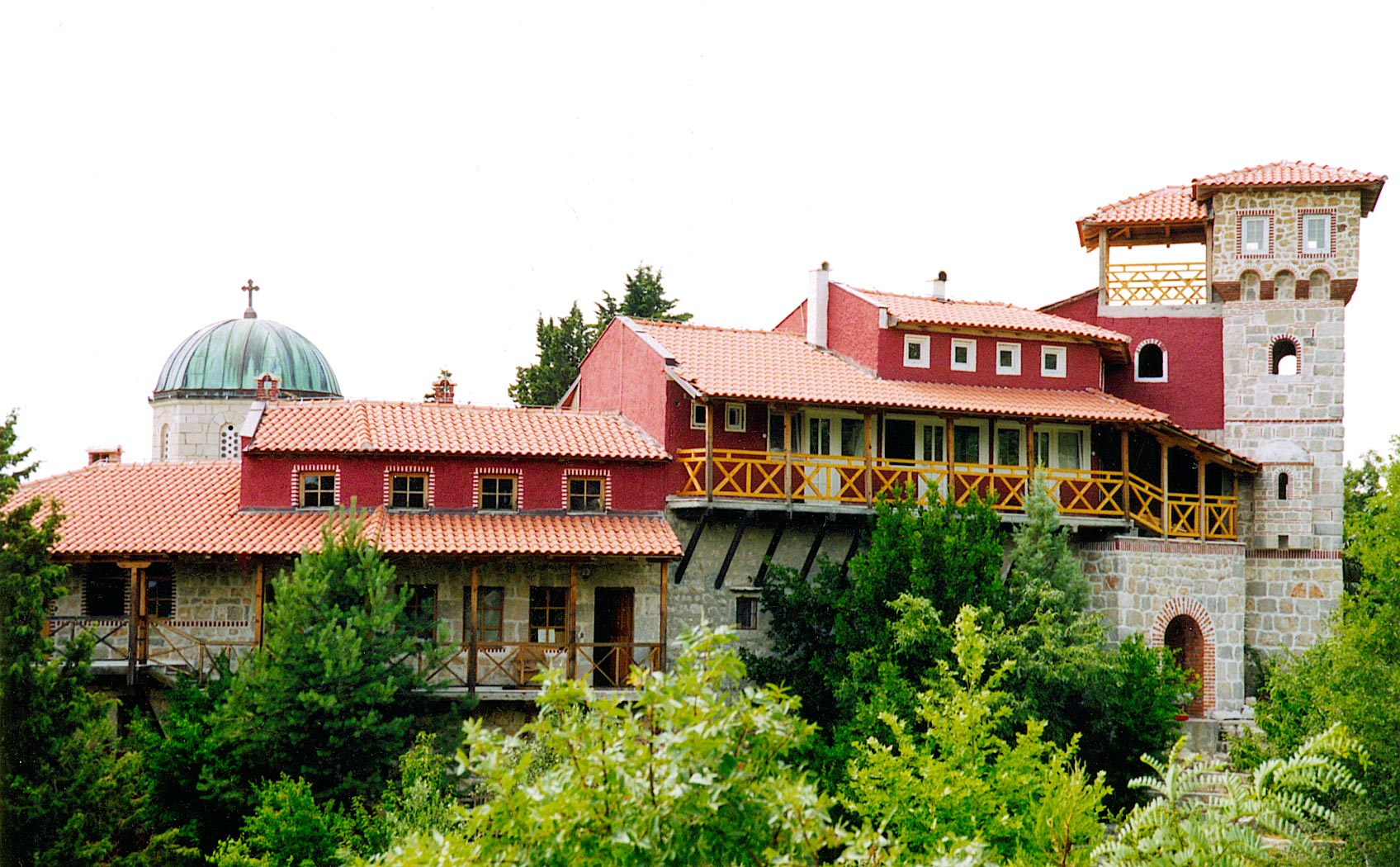
Monastery

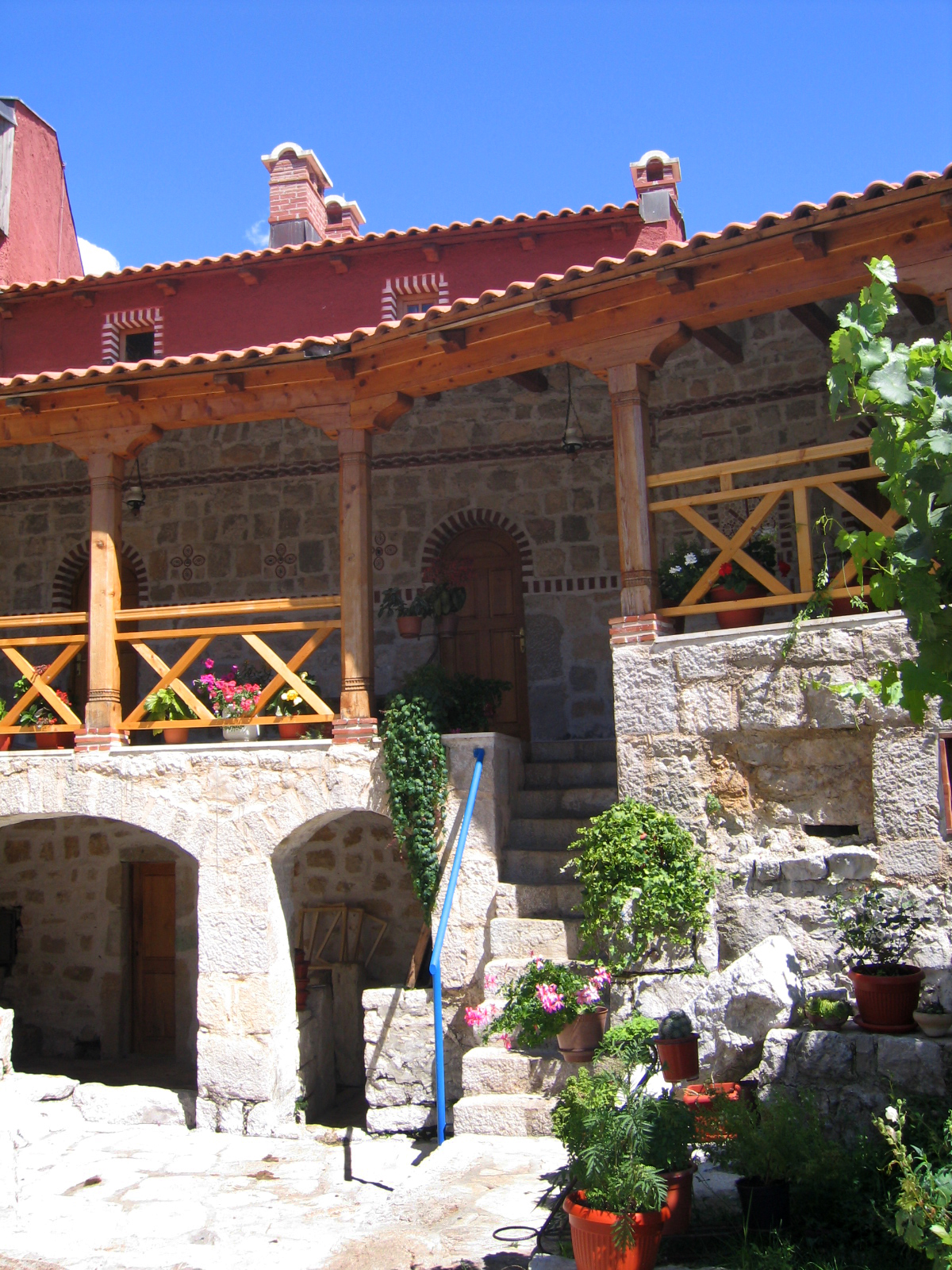
Courtyard

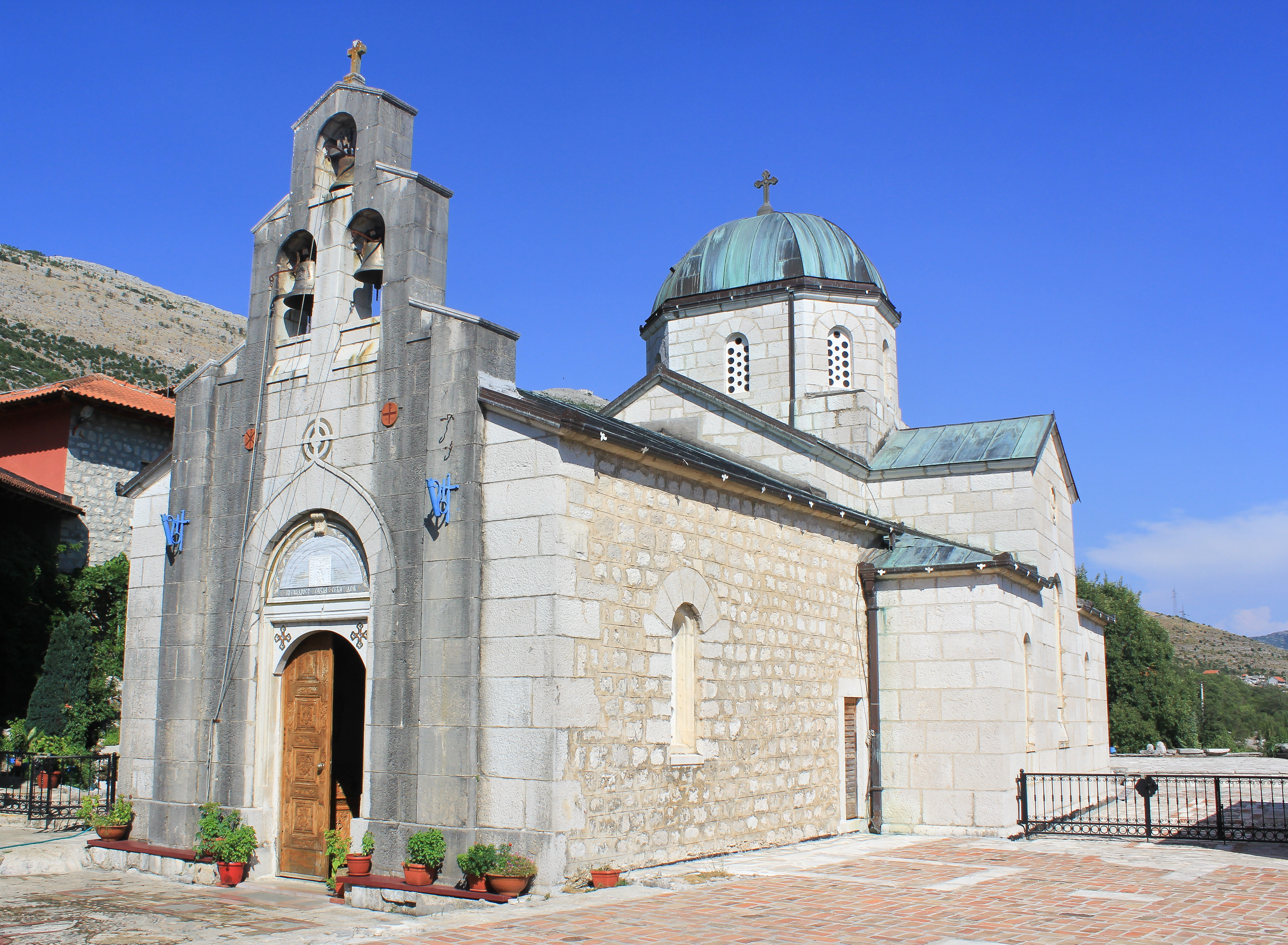
Church

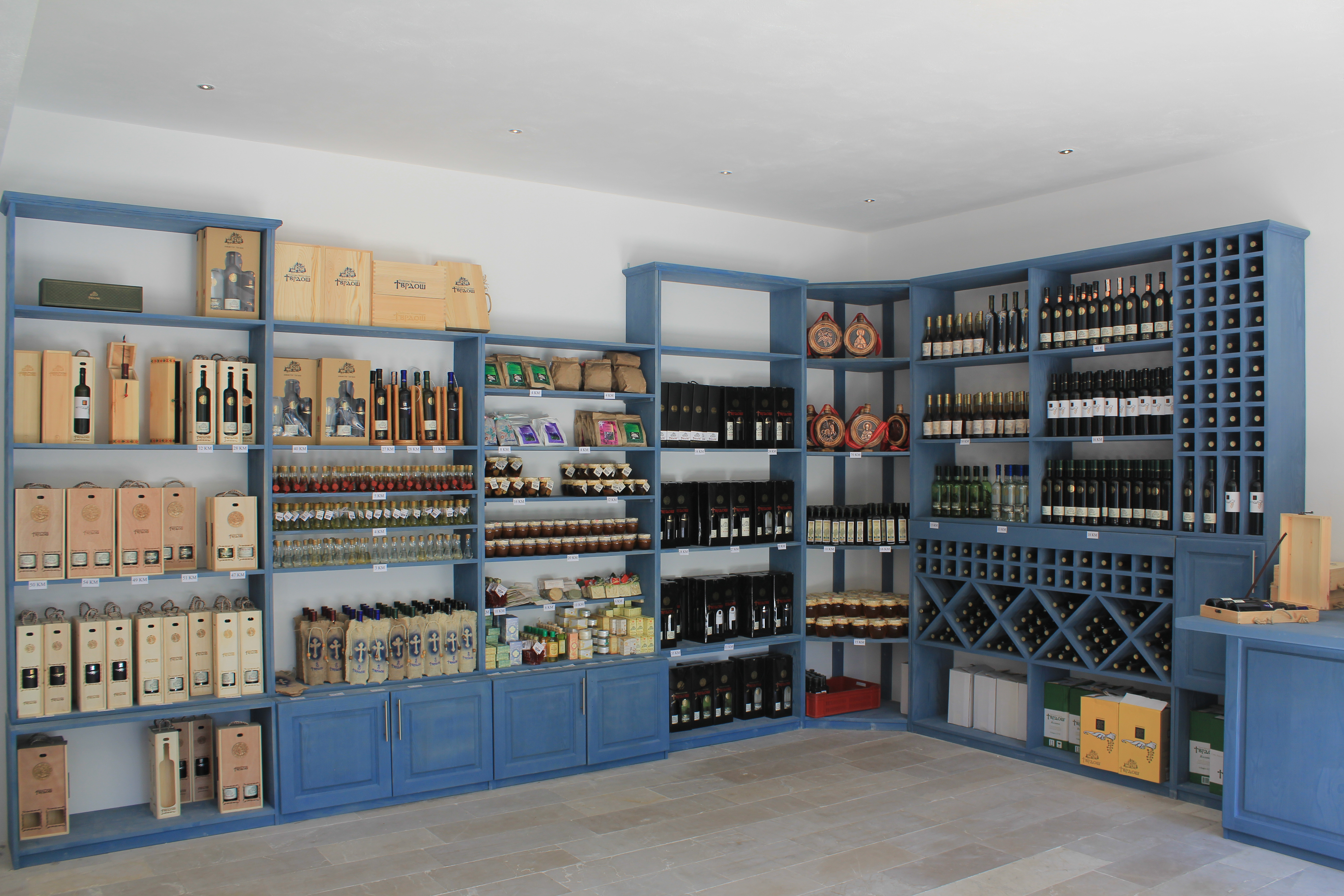
Souvenir shop

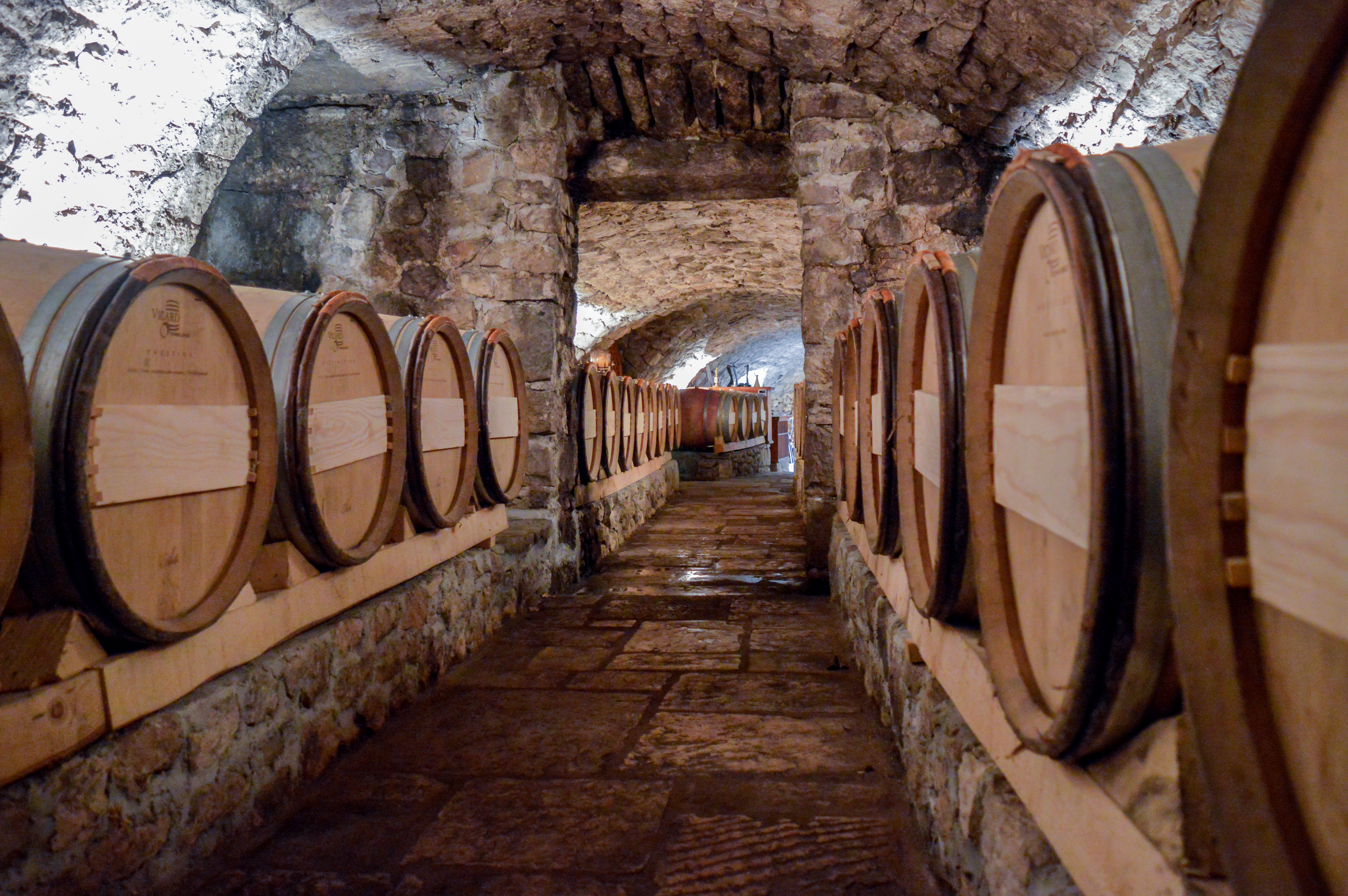
Monastery wine cellars

== See also ==
- List of Serbian Orthodox monasteries
