= Order of Njegoš (Republika Srpska) =

Republika Srpska order

Order of Njegoš Орден Његоша
- Type: Civil decoration
- Awarded for: "for merits in education, culture and economy"
- Presented by: Republika Srpska
- Status: Active
- Established: 28 April 1993
- 1st class 2nd class 3rd class Ribbon bars of the Order of Njegoš

Precedence
- Next (higher): Order of Miloš Obilić
- Next (lower): Order of Honor

Order of Njegoš (Serbian: Орден Његоша) is an Order of the Republic of Srpska. It is established in 1993 by the Constitution of Republika Srpska and 'Law on orders and awards' valid since 28 April 1993.

It is named after Petar II Petrović-Njegoš, the vladika (Prince-bishop) of the Principality of Montenegro from 1830 to 1851.

== Ranks ==
Order of Njegoš is awarded for merits in education, culture and economy, and has three classes.

1st class	2nd class	3rd class

== Notable recipients ==
- 1993 - (Serbia) Grigorije Durić
- 1993 - (Serbia) Jefrem Milutinović
- 1994 - (Montenegro) Amfilohije Radović
- 1996 - (Serbia) Vojislav Topalović
- 1999 - (Bosnia and Herzegovina) Ognjen Tadić
- 2012 - (Serbia) Vojislav Koštunica
- 2018 - (Slovenia) Goran Dragić
- 2018 - (Serbia) Ivana Španović
- 2024 - (Serbia) Mirko Pajčin

== See also ==
- Njegoš
- Orders, decorations and medals of Republika Srpska
