= Dejan Ilić (scientist) =

Serbian scientist

- Дејан Илић
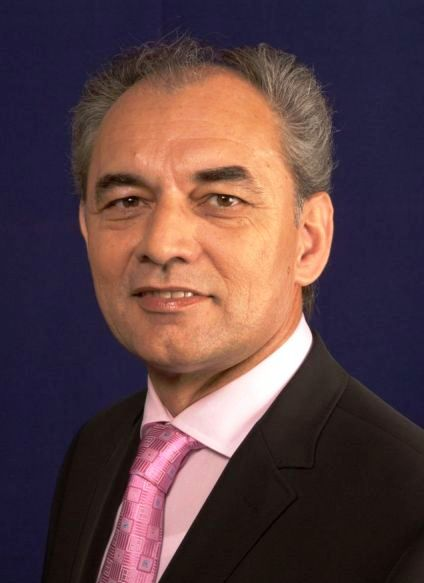

Member of the National Assembly of the Republic of Serbia
- In office 1 August 2022 – 6 February 2024

Personal details
- Born: 27 July 1957 (age 68) Smederevska Palanka, PR Serbia, FPR Yugoslavia
- Party: Independent

Dejan Ilić (Serbian Cyrillic: Дејан Илић; born 27 July 1957) is a Serbian scientist, inventor, academic, and politician. For many years, he was a prominent technological innovator in Germany. He served in the Serbian national assembly from 2022 to 2024 as a non-party delegate endorsed by the Serbian Progressive Party (SNS).

== Early life and private career ==
Ilić was born in the village of Selevac in the municipality of Smederevska Palanka, in what was then the People's Republic of Serbia in the Federal People's Republic of Yugoslavia. He played for the Yugoslavia men's national volleyball team in his youth and studied physical chemistry at the University of Belgrade Faculty of Science and Mathematics, graduating in the French city of Meudon in 1982.

Ilić's volleyball career led him to move to Dresden, then part of the German Democratic Republic, in the early 1980s. He took doctoral studies at TU Dresden and did well in all fields except an obligatory course in Marxism-Leninism; to avoid this requirement, he transferred to the faculty of physical chemistry at Leipzig University. One of his classmates in Leipzig was Angela Merkel, who became a lifelong friend.

After the fall of the Berlin Wall in 1989, Ilić moved to Ellwangen in the Federal Republic of Germany to work as a scientist-researcher for VARTA. He developed a production line for microbatteries in 1996, making the company a world leader in the field. This technology was vital in the development of iPods, iPhones, and related products, and Ilić's involvement with microbatteries led to his becoming a friend of Steve Jobs.

Ilić became a professor at the University of Graz in 2002. In 2006, he was appointed as the head of the German film and television equipment firm Arri; in this role, he created an electronic chip that produced three-dimensional images by converting signals into three primary colours (rather than one colour, which had been the standard up to this time). This invention led to the creation of the Arriflex 235, which in turn led to Ilić winning an Academy Award for technological achievement for his contribution to the James Bond film Quantum of Solace.

In 2013, the Serbian newspaper Politika described Ilić as second only to Nikola Tesla as Serbia's most prolific inventor, with six hundred recognized inventions (two hundred of which were still awaiting publication).

== Parliamentarian ==
In the 2022 Serbian parliamentary election, the Serbian Progressive Party reserved several prominent positions on its Together We Can Do Everything electoral list for non-party cultural figures and academics. Ilić was given the eighth position on the list; this was tantamount to election, and he was indeed elected when the list won a plurality victory with 120 out of 250 mandates. During his assembly term, he was a deputy member of the education committee. (Note: Formally known as the Committee on Education, Science, Technological Development, and the Information Society.)

He was not a candidate in the 2023 Serbian parliamentary election, and his term ended when the new assembly convened in February 2024.
