= Miroslav (given name) =

- Pronunciation: Czech: [ˈmɪroslav] Slovak: [ˈmirɔslaw] Serbo-Croatian: [mîroslaʋ, mǐ-] Russian: [mʲɪrɐˈslaf] Slovene: [ˈmíːrɔslaw] Ukrainian: [ˈmerɔsˈɫau̯]
- Gender: Male
- Name day: Czech Republic: March 6 Croatia: February 1 and July 14; Slovakia: March 29

Origin
- Origin: Slavic
- Meaning: mir 'peace, world' + slav 'celebrate'

Other names
- Alternative spelling: Mirosław, Myroslav
- Nicknames: Miro, Mirko, Slavko, Sláva, Slávek, Mirek, Mireček, Miroušek, Míra, Myrosyk, Mirďa, Mirda
- Related names: Slavomir, Miroslava (f)

Miroslav (Cyrillic: Мирослав) is a Slavic masculine given name. It is derived from the Slavic elements mirŭ ('peace, world') and -slav (slava, 'glory'), thus meaning 'one who celebrates peace, one who celebrates the world'. The feminine form of the name is Miroslava.

It is popular in many Slavic countries, such as Serbia, Croatia, Slovakia, and the Czech Republic. The Polish form of the name is Mirosław / Mirosława.

The Ukrainian form of the name is Myroslav (Ukrainian pronunciation: [merɔsˈɫau̯]) / Myroslava (Ukrainian pronunciation: [merɔsˈɫaʋɐ]).

== Notable people with the name ==
=== Nobility and royalty ===
- Miroslav (kaznac) (fl. 1305–06), Serbian nobleman
- Miroslav, King of Croatia (fl. 945–949), medieval king of Croatia
- Miroslav of Hum (died 1198), Serbian king of Zahumlje
- Miroslav of Podgoria, Serbian Zupan of Podgorica

=== A ===
- Miroslav Abelovský (born 1948), Slovak politician
- Miroslav Adámek (1957–2002), Czech painter, graphic artist and illustrator
- Miroslav Adlešič (1907–2002), Slovene physicist
- Miroslav Aleksić (born 1954), Serbian politician
- Miroslav Aleksić (born 1978), Serbian politician
- Miroslav "Miša" Aleksić (1953–2020), Serbian musician
- Miroslav Antić (1932–1986), Serbian poet, film director and journalist
- Miroslav Antonov (born 1986), Bulgarian footballer

=== B ===
- Miroslav Bajgar (born 1958), Czech handball player
- Miroslav Baranek (born 1973), Czech footballer
- Miroslav Barnyashev (born 1985), Bulgarian professional wrestler better known as Miro
- Miroslav Bartůšek (1921–1985), Czech swimmer
- Miroslav Barčík (born 1978), Slovak footballer
- Miroslav Baumruk (born 1926), Czech basketball player
- Miroslav Beblavý (born 1977), Slovak investor and startup founder
- Miroslav Belanský (1941–2023), Slovak agronomist and politician
- Miroslav Benka (born 1956), Serbian screenwriter, actor and director
- Miroslav Berić (born 1973), Serbian basketball player
- Miroslav Beznoska, Czech fencer
- Miroslav Bičanić (born 1969), Croatian footballer
- Miroslav Bjeloš (born 1990), Serbian footballer
- Miroslav Blaťák (born 1982), Czech ice hockey player
- Miroslav Blažević (1935–2023), Croatian football coach
- Miroslav Bobek (born 1967), Czech natural scientist and manage
- Miroslav Bogosavac (born 1996), Serbian footballer
- Miroslav Bojčeski (born 1968), Macedonian footballer
- Miroslav Bojko (born 1971), Croatian football player and manager
- Miroslav Borshosh (born 1972), Bulgarian politician
- Miroslav Bošković (1947–2023), Serbian footballer
- Miroslav Boyadzhiev (born 1979), Bulgarian short track speed skater
- Miroslav Božok (born 1984), Slovak footballer
- Miroslav Brandt (1914–2002), Croatian historian, writer and publicist
- Miroslav Brozović (1917–2006), Bosnian Croat football player and manager
- Miroslav Budinov (born 1986), Bulgarian footballer
- Miroslav Bukovsky, Australian jazz trumpeter
- Miroslav Bulešić (1920–1947), Croatian Catholic priest
- Miroslav Buljan (born 1955), Croatian football manager

=== C ===
- Miroslav Čabrilo (born 1992), Serbian footballer
- Miroslav Čangalović (1921–1999), Serbian opera and concert singer
- Miroslav Celler (1991–2023), Slovak squash player
- Miroslav Ceplák (born 1983), Czech footballer
- Miroslav Cerar (gymnast) (born 1939), Slovene gymnast and Olympian
- Miroslav Cerar (politician) (born 1963), Slovenian law professor and politician, former Prime Minister of Slovenia
- Miroslav Čermelj (born 1972), Serbian footballer
- Miroslav Chvíla (born 1967), Slovak footballer
- Miroslav Cikán (1896–1962), Czechoslovak film director
- Miroslav Číž (1954–2022), Slovak politician
- Miroslav Čopjak (1963–2021), Czech football manager
- Miroslav Čovilo (born 1986), Bosnian footballer
- Miroslav Čučković (born 1979), Serbian politician
- Miroslav Ćurčić (1962–2017), Serbian footballer
- Miroslav Cvijanović (born 1985), Slovenian footballer

=== D ===
- Miroslav Danov (born 1979), Bulgarian bobsledder
- Miroslav Deronjić (1954–2007), Bosnian Serb politician and criminal
- Miroslav Despotović (born 1983), Macedonian basketball player
- Miroslav Djordjevic (born 1965), Serbian surgeon
- Miroslav Donutil (born 1951) is a Czech actor
- Miroslav Drastík, Czechoslovak slalom canoeist
- Miroslav Drobňák (born 1977), Slovak footballer
- Miroslav Duben (born 1974), Czech professional ice hockey player
- Miroslav Dudekov (born 1955), Bulgarian fencer
- Miroslav Duga (born 1989), Slovak footballer
- Miroslav Dujmović (born 1978), Bosnian footballer
- Miroslav Đukić (born 1966), Serbian footballer
- Miroslav Durak (born 1981), Slovak ice hockey player
- Miroslav Đuričić (born 1977), known as Miki, Serbian television personality
- Miroslav Dvorský (born 1960), Slovak operatic tenor
- Miroslav Dvořák (ice hockey) (1951–2008), Czech ice hockey player
- Miroslav Dvořák (skier) (born 1987), Czech Nordic combined skier

=== E ===
- Miroslav Enchev (born 1991), Bulgarian footballer

=== F ===
- Miroslav Feldman (1899–1976), Croatian-Jewish poet and writer
- Miroslav Fiedler (1926–2015), Czech mathematician
- Miroslav Filipko (born 1973), Slovak footballer
- Miroslav Filipović (1915–1946), Croatian Franciscan friar and war criminal
- Miroslav Filip (1928– 2009), Czech chess grandmaster
- Miroslav Forman (born 1990), Czech ice hockey player
- Miroslav Forte (1911–1942), Slovenian gymnast
- Miroslav Fousek (1923–1993), Czech racecar driver
- Miroslav Šalom Freiberger (1903–1943), Croatian rabbi
- Miroslav Fryčer (1959–2021), Czech ice hockey player

=== G ===
- Miroslav Gajdůšek (born 1951), Czech footballer
- Miroslav Gegić (born 1984), Serbian footballer
- Miroslav Georgiev (born 2005), Bulgarian footballer
- Miroslav Giuchici (footballer, born 1954), Romanian football midfielder
- Miroslav Giuchici (footballer, born 1980), Romanian football striker
- Miroslav Gjokić (born 1973), Macedonian football player
- Miroslav Glavaš (born 1951), Serbian politician
- Miroslav Gochev (born 1973), Bulgarian freestyle wrestler
- Miroslav Gojanović (born 1949), former Yugoslav ice hockey player
- Miroslav Gono (born 2000), Slovak footballer
- Miroslav Gradinarov (born 1985), Bulgarian volleyballer
- Miroslav Grčev (born 1955), Macedonian architect and graphic designer, creator of the North Macedonian flag
- Miroslav Grebeníček (born 1947), Czech politician
- Miroslav Gregáň (born 1996), Slovak footballer
- Miroslav Grujičić (born 1994), Serbian footballer
- Miroslav Grumić (born 1984), Serbian footballer
- Miroslav Guzdek (born 1975), Czech javelin thrower

=== H ===
- Miroslav Hajdučík (born 1962), Czechoslovak slalom canoeist
- Miroslav Hajn (1894–1963), Czech aircraft engineer
- Miroslav Hák (1911–1978), Czechoslovak photographer
- Miroslav Hanuljak (born 1984), Czech ice hockey player
- Miroslav Hanuš (born 1963), Czech actor
- Miroslav Haraus (born 1986), Slovak Paralympic skier
- Miroslav Havel (1922–2008), Czech glass designer
- Miroslav Hlinka (1972–2014), Slovak ice hockey player
- Miroslav Holec (born 1987), Czech ice hockey player
- Miroslav Holeňák (born 1976), Czech footballer
- Miroslav Holub (1923–1998), Czech poet and immunologist
- Miroslav Horníček (1918–2003), Czech actor and director
- Miroslav Horčic (1921–2017), Czechoslovak sprinter
- Miroslav Hozda (born 1986), Czech footballer
- Miroslav Hrdina (born 1976), former Slovak footballer
- Miroslav Hroch (born 1932), Czech historian, political theorist and professor
- Miroslav Hubmajer (1851–1910), Slovenian officer and volunteer in the Herzegovina Uprising
- Miroslav Hýll (born 1973), Slovak football player and manager

=== I ===
- Miroslav Ihnačák (born 1962), Slovak ice hockey player
- Miroslav Ilić (born 1950), Serbian singer-songwriter
- Miroslav Iličić (born 1998), Croatian footballer
- Miroslav Indrák (born 1995), Czech ice hockey player
- Miroslav Ivanišević (born 1956) Montenegrin politician
- Miroslav Ivanov (footballer) (born 1981), Bulgarian footballer
- Miroslav Ivanov (musician) (born 1975), Bulgarian guitar player
- Miroslav Ivanov (writer) (1929–1999), Czech nonfiction writer

=== J ===
- Miroslav Jambor (born 1979), Slovak para table tennis player
- Miroslav Jančich (born 1968), Slovak water polo player
- Miroslav Janíček (born 1974), Slovak weightlifter
- Miroslav Janota (born 1948), Czech wrestler
- Miroslav Jantek (born 1968), Slovak footballer
- Miroslav Janů (1959–2013), Czech football manager
- Miroslav Januš (born 1972), Czech sport shooter
- Miroslav Javín (born 1968), Slovak ice hockey player
- Miroslav Jemelka (born 1931), Czechoslovak sprint canoer
- Miroslav Jenča, Slovak diplomat
- Miroslav Jíška (born 1933), Czech rower
- Miroslav Jočić (born 1962), Serbian judoka
- Miroslav Juhn (July–1941). Croatian Jewish publicist and politician
- Miroslav Jurek (born 1935), Czech long-distance runner
- Miroslav Jureňa (born 1954), Slovak politician
- Miroslav Jurka (born 1987), Czech handball player

=== K ===
- Miroslav Káčer (born 1996), Slovak footballer
- Miroslav Kadlec (born 1964), Czech footballer
- Miroslav Kalousek (born 1960), Czech politician
- Miroslav Kanjevac (born 1963), Serbian professional basketball coach
- Miroslav Karas (born 1964), Czech football player and coach
- Miroslav Karhan (born 1976), Slovak footballer
- Miroslav Kárný (1909–2001), Czech historian and writer
- Miroslav Katětov (1918–1995), Czech mathematician, chess master, and psychologist
- Miroslav Keresteš (born 1989), Slovak footballer
- Miroslav Kirchev (born 1990), Bulgarian sprint canoeist
- Miroslav Kirov (born 1991), Bulgarian freestyle wrestler
- Miroslav Klinger (1893–1979), Czech gymnast
- Miroslav Klose (born 1978), German footballer
- Miroslav Klásek (1913–1976), Czech athlete
- Miroslav Klůc (1922–2012), Czech ice hockey player
- Miroslav Knapek (born 1955), Czech rower
- Miroslav Knedla (born 2005), Czech swimmer
- Miroslav Koev (born 1990), Bulgarian footballer
- Miroslav Kokotović (1913–1988), Bosnian-Croatian footballer
- Miroslav Kollár (born 1969), Slovak politician
- Miroslav Komárek (1924–2013), Czech historical linguist and professor
- Miroslav Kondić (born 1980), Serbian politician
- Miroslav Koníček (born 1936), Czech rower
- Miroslav König (born 1972), Slovak footballer
- Miroslav Konôpka (born 1962), Slovak racing driver
- Miroslav Konštanc Adam (born 1963), Slovak Roman Catholic priest
- Miroslav Kopal (born 1963), Czech Nordic combined skier
- Miroslav Kopřiva (born 1983), Czech ice hockey player
- Miroslav Koranda (1934–2008), Czech coxswain
- Miroslav Kosev (born 1974), Bulgarian footballer
- Miroslav Kostadinov (born 1976), Bulgarian singer
- Miroslav Kostelka (born 1951), Czech diplomat and politician
- Miroslav Košuta (1936–2026), Slovene poet, playwright and translator
- Miroslav Koubek (born 1951), Czech football player and manager
- Miroslav Kouřil (born 1960), Czech football player and manager
- Miroslav Kozák (born 1976), Slovak footballer
- Miroslav Král (born 1986), Czech footballer
- Miroslav Kráľ (born 1947), Slovak footballer
- Miroslav Kraljević (1885–1913), Croatian painter, printmaker and sculptor
- Miroslav Krišan (1968–2023), Serbian politician
- Miroslav Krištić (born 1990), Croatian footballer
- Miroslav Kříženecký (born 1946), Czech lawyer and politician
- Miroslav Krleža (1893–1981), Croatian writer
- Miroslav Krobot (born 1951), Czech theatre director and actor
- Miroslav Krstić (born 1964), American control theorist
- Miroslav Kultyshev (born 1985), Russian pianist
- Miroslav Kurelac (1926–2004), Croatian historian
- Miroslav Kusý (1931–2019) was a Slovak political scientist and politician
- Miroslav Kutle (born 1957), Bosnian Croat entrepreneur
- Miroslav Kvočka (born 1957), Bosnian convicted war criminal

=== L ===
- Miroslav Lacek (born 1959), Czech tennis player
- Miroslav Laholík (born 1952), Czech rower
- Miroslav Lajčák (born 1963), Slovak politician and diplomat, President of the United Nations General Assembly
- Miroslav Lap (born 1950), former Yugoslav ice hockey player
- Miroslav Latiak (born 1981), Slovak footballer
- Miroslav Lazanski (1950–2021), Serbian journalist and diplomat
- Miroslav Lažo (born 1977), Slovak ice hockey player
- Miroslav Lehký (born 1947), Czech/Slovak human rights activist and civil servant
- Miroslav Leitner (born 1966), Slovak ski mountaineer
- Miroslav Lečić (born 1985), Serbian footballer
- Miroslav Lidinský (born 1972), Czech politician
- Miroslav Lipovský (born 1976), Slovak ice hockey player
- Miroslav Lipták (born 1968), Slovak cyclist
- Miroslav Lobantsev (born 1995), Russian professional footballer

=== M ===
- Miroslav Macejko (born 1992) is a Slovak professional ice hockey player
- Miroslav Macek (1944–2024), Czech politician and writer
- Miroslav Macháček (1922–1991), Czech theatre director and actor
- Miroslav Makaveev (born 1973), Bulgarian wrestler
- Miroslav Málek (1915–1995), Czech gymnast
- Miroslav Manolov (born 1985), Bulgarian footballer
- Miroslav Marcinko (born 1964), Slovak ice hockey player
- Miroslav Marcovich (1919–2001), Serbian-American philologist and university professor
- Miroslav Marinov (born 2004), Bulgarian footballer
- Miroslav Maričić (born 1998), Serbian footballer
- Miroslav Markićević (born 1958), Serbian politician
- Miroslav Marković (born 1989), Serbian footballer
- Miroslav Martinjak (born 1951), Croatian organist, composer and university professor
- Miroslav Matiaško (born 1982), former Slovak biathlete
- Miroslav Matušovič (born 1980), former Czech footballer
- Miroslav Menc (born 1971), Czech shot putter
- Miroslav Mentel (born 1962), former Slovak football player and coach
- Miroslav Metzner-Fritz (1904–1992), Yugoslav wrestler
- Miroslav Michalek (born 1965), Slovak ice hockey player
- Miroslav Mikolášik (born 1952) Slovak politician
- Miroslav Miletić (1925–2018), Croatian composer and a violin player
- Miroslav Miller (born 1980), Czech footballer
- Miroslav Milošević, multiple people
- Miroslav Milutinović (born 1985), Bosnian footballer
- Miroslav Minchev (born 1989), Bulgarian male track cyclist
- Miroslav Mindev (born 1980), Bulgarian footballer
- Miroslav Mironov (1963–2014), Bulgarian footballer and coach
- Miroslav Mišković (born 1945), Serbian oligarch and business magnate
- Miroslav Moravec (1939–2009), Czech actor
- Miroslav Mosnár (born 1968), Slovak ice hockey player and coach
- Miroslav Musil (born 1950), Czech wrestler

=== N ===
- Miroslav Navratil (1893–1947), Croatian military commander
- Miroslav Nedvěd, Czechoslovak slalom canoeist
- Miroslav Nekola (born 1947), Czech volleyball player and coach
- Miroslav Nemec (footballer) (born 1971), Slovak footballer and manager
- Miroslav Nemec (actor) (born 1954), German actor of Croatian descent
- Miroslav Nemirov (1961–2016), Russian poet
- Miroslav Nenadović (1904–1989), Serbian engineer and professor
- Miroslav Nešković (1953–2020), Serbian politician
- Miroslav Nikolić (born 1956), Serbian basketball coach
- Miroslav Novák (1907–2000), Czech theologian
- Miroslav Nový (1930–1988), Czech ice hockey player

=== O ===
- Miroslav Obermajer (born 1973), Czech footballer
- Miroslav Ondříček (1934–2015), Czech cinematographer
- Miroslav Opsenica (1981–2011), Serbian footballer
- Miroslav Orlić (born 1993), Austrian footballer
- Miroslav Ouzký (born 1958), Czech politician

=== P ===
- Miroslav Parović (born 1984), Serbian politician
- Miroslav Pastva (born 1992), Slovak footballer
- Miroslav Pavelec (1927–2019), Czechoslovak sprint canoer
- Miroslav Pavlović (1942–2004), Serbian footballer
- Miroslav Pavlov (born 1956), Slovak boxer
- Miroslav Pašajlić (born 1995), Serbian basketball player
- Miroslav Pašek (1922–1956), Czechoslovak ice hockey player
- Miroslav Pecarski (born 1967), Serbian basketball player
- Miroslav Pejić (born 1986), Croatian footballer
- Miroslav Penkov (born 1982), Bulgarian writer
- Miroslav Perković (born 2001), Montenegrin water polo player
- Miroslav Petković (born 1968), Serbian politician
- Miroslav Petko (born 1995), Slovak footballer
- Miroslav Petronijević (born 1987), Serbian footballer
- Miroslav Poche (born 1978), Czech politician and economist
- Miroslav Podrazký (born 1984), Czech footballer
- Miroslav Polak (born 1958), Serbian football player and manager
- Miroslav Poliaček (born 1983), Slovak football executive and former player
- Miroslav Poljak (1944–2015), Croatian water polo player
- Miroslav Popov (basketball) (born 1957), Serbian basketball coach
- Miroslav Popov (born 1995), Czech motorcycle racer
- Miroslav Pospíšil (1890–1964), Czechoslovak footballer
- Miroslav Preisinger (born 1991), Slovak ice hockey player
- Miroslav Přerost (born 1963), Czech ice hockey player
- Miroslav Příložný (born 1955), Czech football player
- Miroslav Pribanić (born 1946), Croatian handball player
- Miroslav Proft (1923–2011), Czech sports shooter
- Miroslav Pržulj (born 1959), known as Lepi Mića, Bosnian Serb singer and songwriter
- Miroslav Pupák (born 1985), Slovak ice hockey player

=== R ===
- Miroslav Rada (born 1976), Czech footballer
- Miroslav Radačovský (born 1953), Slovak judge and politician
- Miroslav Radić (born 1962), Serbian army officer
- Miroslav Radman (born 1944), Croatian biologist
- Miroslav Radoman (born 1958), Serbian football referee and player
- Miroslav Radović (born 1984), Serbian footballer
- Miroslav Radošević (born 1973), Serbian basketball player and coach
- Miroslav Raduljica (born 1988), Serbian basketball player
- Miroslav Radulovič (born 1984), Slovenian footballer
- Miroslav Raičević (born 1981), Serbian professional basketball player and coach
- Miroslav Rede (born 1938), Croatian sports journalist
- Miroslav Rejman (1925–2008), Czech ice hockey player
- Miroslav Řepa (1930–2023), Czech architect
- Miroslav Rikanović (born 1983), Serbian footballer
- Miroslav Rizov (born 1976), Bulgarian footballer
- Miroslav Rodić (born 1968), Serbian politician
- Miroslav Romaschenko (born 1973), Belarusian football manager and former player
- Miroslav Rožić (born 1956), Croatian politician
- Miroslav Růžička (born 1959), Czechoslovak sport shooter
- Miroslav Rypl (born 1992), Czech cross-country skier

=== S ===
- Miroslav Šandor (born 1958), Czechoslovak boxer
- Miroslav Šarić (born 1986), Croatian footballer
- Miroslav Šašek (1916–1980), Czech author and illustrator
- Miroslav Šatan (born 1974), Slovak professional ice hockey player
- Miroslav Savanović (born 1985), Serbian footballer
- Miroslav Savić (born 1973), Serbian footballer
- Miroslav Sedlák (born 1993), Slovak footballer
- Miroslav Sekera, Czech pianist
- Miroslav Seman (born 1973), Slovak footballer
- Miroslav Šeparović (born 1958), Croatian lawyer
- Miroslav Šimek (born 1959), Czech slalom canoeist
- Miroslav Šimonovič (born 1977), Slovak ice hockey player
- Miroslav Šindelka (born 27 June 1963), Slovak director, writer and producer
- Miroslav Singer (born 1968), Czech economist
- Miroslav Škoro (born 1962), Croatian musician and politician
- Miroslav Škovira (born 1973), Slovak ice hockey player
- Miroslav Škumát, Czech ice hockey player
- Miroslav Sládek (24 1950), Czech politician
- Miroslav Sláma (1917–2008), Czechoslovak ice hockey player
- Miroslav Slepička (born 1981) is a Czech football player
- Miroslav Slušný (born 1964), Slovak ski jumper
- Miroslav Šlouf (1948–2018), Czech lobbyist
- Miroslav Šmíd (1952–1993), Czech rock climber and mountaineer
- Miroslav Smíšek (1925–2013), New Zealand potter
- Miroslav Smotlacha (1920–2007), Czech mycologist
- Miroslav Šoška, Slovak figure skater
- Miroslav Soukup (born 1965), Czech football player and manager
- Miroslav Sovič (born 1970), Slovak footballer
- Miroslav Soviš (1954–2015), Czech biathlete
- Miroslav Spalajković (1869–1951), Serbian diplomat
- Miroslav Španović (born 1949), Serbian politician and military official
- Miroslav Šperk (born 1984), Czech Paralympic athlete
- Miroslav Srnka (born 1975), Czech composer
- Miroslav Štandera (1918–2014), Czech fighter pilot during World War II
- Miroslav Stanić (born 1993), Serbian footballer
- Miroslav Stanovský (born 1970), Slovak slalom canoeist
- Miroslav Štefan (born 1933), Czech sports shooter
- Miroslav Štefanka (born 1973), Slovak ice hockey player
- Miroslav Štěpán (1945–2014), Czechoslovak politician
- Miroslav Štěpánek (artist) (1930–2005), Czech artist
- Miroslav Štěpánek (footballer) (born 1990), Czech footballer
- Miroslav Stevanović (born 1990), Bosnian footballer
- Miroslav Stević (born 1970), Serbian footballer
- Miroslav Stoch (born 1989), Slovak footballer
- Miroslav Stojanović (born 1939), Serbian sport shooter
- Miroslav Štolfa (1930–2018), Czech painter, printmaker and university lecturer
- Miroslav Strejček (1929–2000), Czech rower
- Miroslav Šubrt (1926–2012), Czech ice hockey executive
- Miroslav Šugar (born 1957), Croatian footballer
- Miroslav Šulek (born 1993), Slovak cross-country skier
- Miroslav Šuput (born 1948), Slovenian painter and illustrator
- Miroslav Šustek (1947–2015), Slovak writer
- Miroslav Šustera (1878–1961), Czech track and field athlete
- Miroslav Šuta (born 1969), Czech environmental expert
- Miroslav Šutej (1936–2005), Croatian painter and graphic artist
- Miroslav "Žiarislav" Švický (born 1967), Slovak musician and modern pagan leader
- Miroslav Svoboda (football coach), Slovak football coach
- Miroslav Svoboda (ice hockey) (born 1995), Czech ice hockey player

=== T ===
- Miroslav Táborský (born 1959), Czech actor
- Miroslav Tadić (born 1959), Bosnian guitarist and composer
- Miroslav Tanjga (born 1964), Serbian former footballer
- Miroslav Tankosić (born 1978), Serbian footballer
- Miroslav Tetter (1938–2021), Czech politician and academic
- Miroslav Tichý (1926–2011), Czech photographer
- Miroslav Todić (born 1985), Bosnian basketball player
- Miroslav Todorov (born 1985), Bulgarian footballer
- Miroslav Toman Sr. (1935–2023), Czech businessman and politician
- Miroslav Tóth (born 1978), Slovak footballer
- Miroslav Trejtnar (born 1962), Czech puppeteer and teacher of puppetry
- Miroslav Třetina (born 1980), Czech ice hockey player
- Miroslav Trifunović (1894–1945), Yugoslav brigadier general
- Miroslav Trunda (born 1984), Czech equestrian
- Miroslav Tulis (born 1951), Czech sprinter
- Miroslav Tuđman (1946–2021), Croatian politician
- Miroslav Tyrš (1832–1884), Czech philosopher and art historian

=== U ===
- Miroslav Úradník (born 1996), Slovak racewalking athlete

=== V ===
- Miroslav Vacek (1935–2022), Czech politician and lieutenant general
- Miroslav Vajs (born 1979), Macedonian footballer
- Miroslav Vanko (born 1973), Slovak long-distance runner
- Miroslav Vardić (1944–2018), Serbian professional footballer
- Miroslav Varga (born 1960), Czechoslovak sport shooter
- Miroslav Vejvoda (1932–1994), Czech sailor
- Miroslav Venhoda (1915–1987), Czech choral conductor
- Miroslav Verner (born 1941), Czech egyptologist
- Miroslav Viazanko (born 1981), Slovak footballer
- Miroslav Vicković (1951–2004), Montenegrin politician
- Miroslav Vidac (1949–2011), Romanian footballer
- Miroslav Josić Višnjić (1946–2015), Serbian writer and poet
- Miroslav Vitouš (born 1947), Czech jazz bassist
- Miroslav Vjetrović (born 1956), Serbian footballer
- Miroslav Vlach (1935–2001), Czechoslovak ice hockey player
- Miroslav Vodehnal (born 1976) Czech footballer
- Miroslav Vodovnik (born 1977), Slovenian shot putter
- Miroslav Volf (born 1956), Croatian Protestant theologian and professor
- Miroslav Votava (born 1956), German football player and manager
- Miroslav Vraštil Jr. (born 1982), Czech rower
- Miroslav Vraštil Sr. (born 1951), Czech rower
- Miroslav Vujadinović (born 1983), Montenegrin footballer
- Miroslav Vujasinović, Croatian handball coach
- Miroslav Vukašinović (born 1948), Serbian football player and manager
- Miroslav Vulićević (born 1985), Serbian footballer
- Miroslav Vučetić (born 1976), Croatian swimmer
- Miroslav Vymazal (1952– 2002), Czech cyclist
- Miroslav Válek (1927–1991), Slovak poet, publicist and politician
- Miroslav Vítek (1909–1976), Czechoslovak athlete

=== W ===
- Miroslav Wanek (born 1962), Czech poet and composer
- Miroslav Wlachovský (born 1970), Slovak diplomat

=== Z ===
- Miroslav Zálešák (born 1980), Slovak former professional ice hockey player
- Miroslav Žamboch (born 1972), Czech physicist and author
- Miroslav Žbirka (1952–2021), Slovak singer and songwriter
- Miroslav Zei (1914–2006), Slovene marine biologist
- Miroslav Zelinka (born 1981), Czech football referee
- Miroslav Zeman (born 1946), Czechoslovak wrestler
- Miroslav Zikmund (1919–2021), Czech travel writer and explorer
- Miroslav Žitnjak (born 1967), Croatian footballer
- Miroslav Živković (1934–2009), Serbian naïve art painter

== See also ==
- Miroslava (given name), feminine form of the name
- Mirosław (given name), Polish form of the name
- Myroslav, Ukrainian form of the name
- Miroslavs Mitrofanovs (born 1966), Latvian journalist and politician
