= Myroslav =

- Pronunciation: [merɔsˈɫau̯]
- Gender: male
- Language: Ukrainian

Origin
- Meaning: myr 'peace, world' + slav 'glory, celebrate'
- Region of origin: Ukraine

Other names
- Variant form: Myroslava (feminine)
- Derived: Myroslav
- Related names: Slawomyr

Myroslav (Мирослав, IPA: [merɔsˈɫau̯]) is a Ukrainian masculine given name of Slavic origin, equivalent to Miroslav. It is composed of the elements myr ("peace, world") and -o- and slav ("glory, fame"), thus meaning 'person who loves peace', or 'person who achieves fame by establishing peace'.

Diminutive forms include Miro, Mirko, Myrosyk and Slavko, Slava.

Its feminine form is Myroslava (Ukrainian pronunciation: [merɔsˈɫaʋɐ]). Diminutive forms include Mira, Mirka, Myrosya and Slava.

== Notable people with the name ==
- Myroslav Bundash (born 1976), Ukrainian footballer
- Myroslav Dumanskyi (1929–1996), retired Soviet football player and Ukrainian coach
- Myroslav Dykun (born 1982), Ukrainian born British amateur wrestler
- Myroslav Ivan Lubachivsky (1914–2000), Major Archbishop of Lviv and head of the Ukrainian Greek Catholic Church
- Myroslav Marynovych (born 1949), vice-rector of the Ukrainian Catholic University in Lviv
- Myroslav Skoryk (1938–2020), famous Ukrainian composer of diverse and impressive compositions
- Myroslav Slavov (born 1990), Ukrainian football forward
- Myroslaw Stechishin (1883–1947), socialist activist and Ukrainian-Canadian public figure
- Myroslav Stupar (born 1941), former Soviet and Ukrainian football referee

== See also ==
- Myroslava, female form of the name
- Miroslav (given name)
