= Miroslav Giuchici =

Miroslav Giuchici may refer to:

- Miroslav Giuchici (footballer, born 1954), Romanian football midfielder
- Miroslav Giuchici (footballer, born 1980), Romanian football striker
