= Mirosław (given name) =

- Pronunciation: [miˈrɔswaf]
- Gender: male
- Language: Polish
- Name day: 2 February or 26 February

Origin
- Meaning: mir 'peace, world' + slav 'glory, celebrate'
- Region of origin: Poland

Other names
- Variant form: Mirosława (feminine)
- Derived: Miroslav
- Related names: Sławomir

Mirosław (Polish pronunciation: [miˈrɔswaf]) is a Polish masculine given name of Slavic origin, equivalent to Miroslav. It is composed of the elements miro ('peace, world') and sław ('glory, fame'), thus meaning 'person who loves peace' or 'person who achieves fame by establishing peace'.

Diminutive forms include Mirek and Mirka. Its feminine form is Mirosława (Polish pronunciation: [mirɔˈswava]).

Individuals with this name celebrate name day on February 26.

== Notable people with the name ==
=== A-J ===
- Mirosław Adamczyk (born 1962), Polish prelate of the Catholic Church
- Mirosław Araszewski (born 1941), Polish photographer and cinematographer
- Mirosław Bąk (born 1961), Polish footballer
- Mirosław Baka (born 1963), Polish actor
- Miroslaw Balka (born 1958), Polish sculptor and video artist
- Mirosław Baszak, Polish-Canadian cinematographer
- Mirosław Bojanowicz (1906–1986), Polish philatelist
- Mirosław Bulzacki (born 1951), Polish footballer
- Mirosław Car (1960–2013), Polish footballer
- Mirosław Chmara (born 1964), Polish pole vaulter
- Mirosław Chojecki (1949–2025), Polish publisher and film producer
- Mirosław Copija (born 1965), Polish ice hockey player
- Mirosław Czech (born 1962), Polish journalist and politician
- Mirosław Dreszer (born 1965), Polish footballer
- Mirosław Drzewiecki (born 1956), Polish politician
- Mirosław Dzielski (1941–1989), Polish philosopher and writer
- Mirosław Ferić (1915–1942), Polish fighter pilot, flying ace of World War II
- Mirosław Formela (1978–2025), Polish middle distance runner
- Mirosław Giruć (born 1972), Polish footballer
- Mirosław Głos (1953–2020), Polish footballer
- Mirosław Gojdź (born 1962), Polish politician and diplomat
- Mirosław Golon (born 1964), Polish historian
- Mirosław Grabarczyk (born 1971), Polish chess grandmaster
- Mirosław Graf (born 1959), Polish former ski jumper
- Mirosław Handke (1946–2021), Polish chemist and politician
- Mirosław Hermaszewski (1941–2022), Polish cosmonaut and the first Pole in space
- Mirosław Hydel (born 1963), Polish long jumper
- Mirosław Iringh (1914–1985), Polish-Slovak military commander
- Mirosław Jabłoński (born 1950), Polish football manager
- Mirosław Jarzembowski (born 1954), Polish rower
- Mirosław Jasiński (born 1960), Polish film director and diplomat

=== K-R ===
- Mirosław Kalita (born 1970), Polish football player and manager
- Mirosław Kochalski (born 1965), Polish politician
- Mirosław Korbel (born 1963), Polish motorcycle speedway rider
- Mirosław Kowalewski (born 1952), Polish rower
- Mirosław Kowalik (speedway rider) (born 1969), Polish motorcycle speedway rider
- Mirosław Koźlakiewicz (born 1957), Polish politician
- Mirosław Krajewski (born 1946), Polish politician
- Mirosław Kuba Brożek, Polish cinematographer
- Mirosław Ławrynowicz (1947–2005), Polish violinist and teacher
- Mirosław Kubisztal (born 1962), Polish footballer
- Mirosław Madzia (born 1979), Polish Paralympic athlete
- Mirosław Maliszewski (born 1968), Polish politician
- Mirosław Małek (born 1975), Polish windsurfer
- Mirosław Małolepszy (1955–2022), Polish footballer
- Mirosław Milewski (1928–2008), Polish communist activist
- Mirosław Mosór (born 1968), Polish footballer
- Mirosław Mruk (born 1962), Polish rower
- Mirosław Mścisz (born 1963), Polish footballer
- Mirosław Nahacz (1984–2007), Polish novelist
- Mirosław Obłoński (1938–2023), Polish poet and writer
- Mirosław Okoński (born 1958 in Koszalin), Polish footballer
- Mirosław Orzechowski (born 1957), Polish politician
- Mirosław Pawlak (born 1942), Polish politician
- Mirosław Pękala (born 1961), Polish footballer
- Mirosław Piękoś (born 1963), Polish footballer
- Mirosław Pietrewicz (1941–2022), Polish politician
- Mirosław Piotrowski (born 1966), Polish politician
- Mirosław Pych (born 1972), Polish paralympic athlete
- Miroslaw Rogala, Polish-born American video artist and interactive artist
- Mirosław Romanowski (1901–1991), Canadian mathematician and metrologist
- Mirosław Rybaczewski (born 1952), Polish volleyball player
- Mirosław Rzepa (born 1968), Polish footballer
- Mirosław Rzepkowski (born 1959), Polish sport shooter

=== S-Z ===
- Mirosław Sawicki (1946–2016), Polish teacher and activist
- Mirosław Sekuła (born 1955), Polish chemist and politician
- Mirosław J. Skibniewski (born 1957), Polish professor of construction engineering
- Mirosław Smyła (born 1969), Polish football player and manager
- Mirosław Spiżak (born 1979), Polish footballer
- Mirosław Jan Stasik (1929–2023), Polish medical doctor and toxicologist
- Mirosław Suchoń (born 1976), Polish politician
- Mirosław Szłapka (born 1956), Polish equestrian
- Mirosław Sznaucner (born 1979), Polish footballer
- Miroslaw Szonert (1926–1995), Polish film and television actor
- Mirosław Szymkowiak (born 1976), Polish footballer
- Mirosław Tłokiński (born 1955), Polish footballer
- Mirosław Tomasik (born 1965), Polish ice hockey player
- Mirosław Tryczyk (born 1977), Polish philosopher and writer
- Mirosław Trzeciak (born 1968), Polish footballer
- Mirosław Turko (1918–1981), Polish-Ukrainian football player and coach
- Mirosław Vitali (1914–1992), Polish physician specialising in treatment and care of amputees
- Mirosław Waligóra (born 1970), Polish footballer
- Mirosław Widuch (born 1971), Polish footballer
- Mirosław Więckowski (born 1952), Polish luger
- Mirosław Włodarczyk (born 1959), Polish high jumper
- Mirosław Wodzyński (born 1951), Polish hurdler
- Mirosław Żak (1936–2025), Polish surveyor and academic
- Mirosław Zbrojewicz (born 1957), Polish actor
- Mirosław Żerkowski (born 1956), Polish runner
- Mirosław Ziętarski (born 1993), Polish rower
- Mirosław Złotkowski (1956–2006), Polish wrestler
- Mirosław Żuławski (1913–1995), Polish writer, diplomatist and screenwriter

== See also ==
- Mirosława, female form of the name
- Mirosław (disambiguation)
- Miroslav (given name)
- Aleksandra Mirosław (born 1994), Polish competition speed climber
- Rafael Miroslaw (born 2001), German swimmer
