= Miroslav =

Miroslav may refer to:

- Miroslav (given name), a Slavic masculine given name
- Young America (clipper) or Miroslav, an Austrian clipper ship in the Transatlantic case oil trade
- Miroslav (Znojmo District), a town in the Czech Republic

== See also ==
- Miroslava (disambiguation)
- Mirosław (disambiguation)
