= Šuput =

Šuput is a Serbian surname. It may refer to:

- Bogdan Šuput (born 1914–1942), Serbian painter
- Maja Šuput (born 1979), Croatian singer
- Miroslav Šuput (born 1948), Slovene painter and illustrator
- Predrag Šuput (born 1977), Serbian basketball player
