= Kurelac =

Kurelac is a Croatian surname. Notable people with the surname include:

- Fran Kurelac (1811–1874), Croatian writer and philologist
- Miroslav Kurelac (1926–2004), Croatian historian
- Iva Kurelac (*1975), Croatian classical philologist and historian
