= Ceplak =

Čeplak or Ceplák is a surname. Notable people with the surname include:

- Jolanda Čeplak (born 1976), Slovene middle-distance runner
- Miroslav Ceplák (born 1983), Czech footballer
