= Miroslava (given name) =

- Pronunciation: Czech: [ˈmɪroslava] Slovak: [ˈmirɔsɫava] Serbo-Croatian: [mîroslaʋa] Ukrainian: [mɪrosˈɫaʋɐ]
- Gender: Female

Origin
- Language: Slavic
- Origin: Slavic
- Meaning: mir 'peace, world' + slav 'celebrate'

Other names
- Variant form: Mirosława (Polish form)
- Nickname: Mirka
- Related names: Miroslav

Miroslava or Myroslava (Cyrillic: Мирослава) is a Slavic feminine dithematic given name. It is the feminine form of Miroslav, derived from the Slavic elements mirŭ ('peace, world') and slava ('glory'), thus meaning 'one who celebrates peace, one who celebrates the world'.

== People with the given name Miroslava ==
- Miroslava of Bulgaria, Bulgarian-Byzantine noblewoman, daughter of tsar Samuil of Bulgaria
- Miroslava of Pomerelia (died 1240), Duchess consort of Pomerania
- Miroslava Brdíčková (1927–1957), Czech gymnast
- Miroslava Breach (1962–2017), Mexican investigative journalist
- Miroslava Černá (born 1972), Czech archer
- Miroslava Chavez-Garcia, Mexican-American professor of history
- Miroslava Dagbaeva (born 1987), Russian-Mongolian archer
- Miroslava Duma (born 1985), Russian entrepreneur and investor
- Miroslava Federer (born 1978), Swiss tennis player, wife and manager of Roger Federer
- Miroslava Geč Korošec (1939–2002), Slovenian lawyer and judge
- Myroslava Gongadze (born 1972), Ukrainian journalist
- Miroslava Jánošíková (born 1969), Slovak Olympic judoka
- Miroslava Jaškovská (born 1955), Czechoslovak cross-country skier
- Miroslava Karpovich (born, 1986), Russian actress and model
- Miroslava Kijaková (born 1988), Slovak volleyball player
- Miroslava Knapková (born 1980), Czech rower
- Miroslava Kopicová (born 1951), Czech politician
- Miroslava Koželuhová (born 1951), Czech tennis player
- Miroslava Milenović (born 1963), Serbian forensic accountant
- Miroslava Montemayor (born 1990), Mexican sportscaster
- Miroslava Najdanovski (born 1988), Serbian Olympic swimmer
- Miroslava Němcová (born 1952), Czech politician
- Miroslava Pribylova (born 1970), Canadian volleyball player
- Miroslava Ritskiavitchius (born 1964), German-Lithuanian handball player
- Miroslava Șandru (1916-1983), Romanian ethnographer and folklorist
- Miroslava Sedláčková (born 1977), Czech Paralympic athlete
- Miroslava Skleničková (born 11 March 1951), Czech gymnast
- Miroslava Stanković Đuričić (born 1976), Serbian politician
- Miroslava Stern (1926–1955), Czechoslovak-Mexican actress
- Miroslava Syllabová (born 1990), Slovak swimmer

== See also ==
- Mirosława, Polish form of the name
- Miroslava (disambiguation)
- Miroslav (given name)
