= Miroslav Krišan =

Serbian politician (1968–2023)

- Мирослав Кришан

Mayor of Kovačica
- In office 2000 – 29 October 2015
- Succeeded by: Jan Husarik

Member of the Assembly of Vojvodina
- In office 16 July 2008 – 17 May 2010

Member of the National Assembly of the Republic of Serbia
- In office 25 January 1994 – 3 December 1997

Personal details
- Born: 29 January 1968
- Died: 15 August 2023 (aged 55)
- Party: DS

Miroslav Krišan (Serbian Cyrillic: Мирослав Кришан; 29 January 1968 – 15 August 2023) was a Serbian politician. He was the mayor of Kovačica from 2000 to 2015 and served at different times in the National Assembly of Serbia and the Assembly of Vojvodina. Krišan was a member of the Democratic Party (DS).

== Private career ==
Originally from the village of Debeljača, Krišan was an electrical technician of electromechanics by profession. From 1992 until his death, he was the manager of a shoe factory in Kovačica.

== Politician ==
=== National Assembly ===
Krišan appeared in the twenty-seventh position (out of twenty-eight) on the Democratic Party's electoral list for the Zrenjanin division in the 1993 Serbian parliamentary election. The list won four mandates, and, perhaps somewhat improbably, he was included in the party's delegation when the assembly convened in January 1994. (From 1992 to 2000, Serbia's electoral law stipulated that one-third of parliamentary mandates would be assigned to candidates on successful lists in numerical order, while the remaining two-thirds would be distributed amongst other candidates at the discretion of sponsoring parties or coalitions. Krišan's low position on the list did not prevent him from receiving a mandate.) At the time he was sworn in, Krišan was the youngest member of the assembly. The Socialist Party of Serbia (SPS) won the election, and the DS served in opposition for the term that followed.

The DS boycotted the 1997 parliamentary election, and Krišan was not a candidate for re-election.

=== Mayor of Kovačica ===
In 2000, the Democratic Party joined the Democratic Opposition of Serbia (DOS), a broad and ideologically diverse coalition of parties opposed to Slobodan Milošević's administration. DOS candidate Vojislav Koštunica defeated Milošević in the 2000 Yugoslavian presidential election, a watershed moment in Serbian and Yugoslavian politics. The DOS won a landslide majority in Kovačica in the concurrent 2000 Serbian local elections, and Krišan was chosen afterward as mayor. He oversaw the privatization of several local industries in his first term, and in 2002 he presided over the municipality's two-hundredth anniversary.

Serbia introduced the direct election of mayors for the 2004 local elections, and Krišan was re-elected in Kovačica. Direct election was discarded after a single term; Krišan led the Democratic Party to victories in the 2008 and 2012 local elections, and on both occasions he was confirmed for a new term as mayor by the elected delegates. He announced his resignation in late 2011, after the construction of a facility for recycling, processing, and storage of hazardous waste was defeated in a referendum vote and local citizens staged protests against the project. His resignation notice was not final, and he withdrew it a month later.

Krišan was arrested in October 2013 on suspicion of corruption involving overpayments for local road construction. He denied the charge, saying that it was politically motivated. He was acquitted in 2018, by which time he had already left the mayor's office.

The Serbian Progressive Party (SNS) formed a new governing coalition in the municipality in October 2015, and Krišan's term as mayor came to an end. He led the DS list in Kovačica for the 2016 local elections and was re-elected when the list won nine out of twenty-nine mandates. The SNS won a majority victory, and he served in opposition in his last assembly term. He was not a candidate in the 2020 local elections, which were boycotted by the DS.

=== Provincial and republican politics after 2000 ===
Serbia's electoral system was reformed in 2000, such that all mandates were awarded to candidates on successful lists at the discretion of the sponsoring parties or coalitions, irrespective of numerical order, and the entire country became a single electoral division at the republican level. Krišan appeared in the 179th position on the DS's electoral list in the 2003 parliamentary election and did not receive a mandate when the list won thirty-seven seats. He sought election to the DS's presidency in 2006 but was unsuccessful.

Krišan appeared in the thirty-eighth position on the DS's For a European Vojvodina list in the 2008 Vojvodina provincial election and was given a mandate when the list won twenty-three proportional seats. The DS and its allies won a majority victory overall; Krišan was a supporter of the administration and chaired the committee for administration and local self-government. He resigned his seat in May 2010 due to a change in Vojvodina's conflict-of-interest laws involving dual mandates.

Serbia's electoral laws were changed again in 2011, such that all mandates were awarded in numerical order to candidates on successful lists. Krišan received the twenty-third position on the DS's list in the 2012 provincial election and was not re-elected when the list won sixteen proportional mandates. He was promoted to the sixteenth position in the 2016 provincial election and again missed election when the list fell to ten seats.

Krišan also received the 121st position on the DS's list in the 2014 Serbian parliamentary election. Election from this position was improbable, and he was not elected when the list won nineteen mandates.

== Death ==
Miroslav Krišan died of a heart attack at his home in Kovačica, on 15 August 2023, at the age of 55.

== Electoral record ==
=== Local (Kovačica) ===
2004 Municipality of Kovačica local election: Mayor of Kovačica (second round results)
Candidate	Party	Votes	%
Miroslav Krišan (incumbent)	Democratic Party	3,656	57.41
		2,712	42.59
Total		6,368	100.00
