= Miroslava =

Miroslava may refer to:

- Miroslava (given name), list of people with the name
- Miroslava (film), a 1993 film about Miroslava Stern
- Miroslava (fly), a genus in family Scathophagidae
- Miroslava, Iași, a commune in Iaşi County, Romania
- CS Știința Miroslava, Romanian football club from Miroslava, Iași

== See also ==
- Miroslav (disambiguation)
- Mirosława
