= Miro (given name) =

Miro is a masculine given name.

Notable people with the name include:

- Miro (Suebian king) (died 583), Galician king
- Rusev (wrestler) (born 1984), Bulgarian-American professional wrestler who used to wrestle in AEW as Miro
- Miro, Count of Barcelona (died 966), Catalan nobleman
- Miro the Elder (died 896), Catalan nobleman
- Miroslav Kostadinov (born 1976), Bulgarian singer known as "Miro"
- Michael Rodenberg (born 1970), German musician nicknamed Miro
- Miro Alilović (born 1977), Slovenian basketball coach
- Miro Allione (1932–2006), Italian executive
- Miro Baldo Bento (born 1975), East Timorese football player
- Miro Barešić (1950–1991), Yugoslav-Croatian convicted murderer and later soldier
- Miro Cerar (born 1963), Slovenian lawyer and politician
- Miro Gavran (born 1961), Croatian writer
- Miro Heiskanen (born 1999), Finnish ice hockey player
- Miro Jurić (born 1972), Croatian basketball coach and former player
- Miro Karjalainen (born 1996), Finnish ice hockey player
- Miro Kepinski (born 1980), Polish film composer, music producer, and performer
- Miro Kocuvan (athlete, born 1947), Yugoslav sprinter
- Miro Kocuvan (born 1971), Slovenian athlete who specialised in the 400 metres hurdles
- Miro Kovač (born 1968), Croatian diplomat and politician
- Miro Little (born 2004), Finnish-American basketball player
- Miro Kwasnica (born 1935), former educator, driving instructor, and political figure in Saskatchewan
- Miro Major (born 1980), New Zealand footballer and futsal player
- Miro Moreira (born 1984), Brazilian male model
- Miro Muheim (born 1998), Swiss footballer
- Miro Oman (1936–2012), Yugoslavian ski jumper
- Miro Pandurević (born 1964), Yugoslav bobsledder
- Miro Quimbo (born 1969), Filipino politician
- Miro Ronac (born 1961), Peruvian athlete
- Miró Ruiz, Peruvian politician
- Miro Sipek (born 1948), Bosnian (ex-Yugoslav) Australian rifle shooting coach
- Miro Slavov (born 1990), Ukrainian football forward
- Miro Steržaj (born 1933), Slovene 9 pin bowler and businessman
- Miro Tabanelli (born 2004), Italian freestyle skier
- Miro Teixeira (born 1945), Brazilian lawyer, politician and journalist
- Miro Tenho (born 1995), Finnish footballer
- Miro Tërbaçe, a semi-legendary Albanian
- Miro Turunen (born 2003), Finnish footballer
- Miro Schluroff (born 2002), German handball player
- Miro (footballer) (born 2003), Angolan footballer

== See also ==
- Miroslav (given name)
