= Mirka (name) =

Mirka is a Finnish or Slavic feminine given name, and a surname. It can also be a diminutive of given names such as Miroslava or Mirosław

Notable people with the name include:

== Given name ==
- Mirka Andolfo (born 1989), Italian comic book artist and writer
- Mirka Cabrera (born 1994), Ecuadorian model
- Mirka Federer (Miroslava Vavrinec, born 1978), Slovak-born Swiss tennis player
- Mirka Francia (born 1975), Cuban-Italian volleyball player
- Mirka Grujić (1869–1940), Serbian nurse
- Mirka Koželuhová (born 1951), Czech tennis player
- Mirka Miller (1949–1916), Czech-Australian mathematician and computer scientist, university professor
- Mirka Mora (1928–2018), French-born Australian visual artist
- Mirka Rantanen, Finnish musician
- Mirka Soinikoski (born 1975), Finnish politician
- Mirka Vasiljević (born 1990), Serbian actress
- Mirka Velinovska (born 1952), Macedonian journalist
- Mirka Yemendzakis (died 2013), Greek actress, musician and voice coach

== Surname ==
- Vladimír Mirka (born 1928), Czech football coach
