= Miroslav Macejko =

Slovak ice hockey defenceman

- Born: 9 April 1992 (age 33) Košice, Slovakia
- Height: 6 ft 0 in (183 cm)
- Weight: 198 lb (90 kg; 14 st 2 lb)
- Position: Defence
- Shoots: Left
- Slovak team Former teams: HK Dukla Michalovce; HC Košice; HC 46 Bardejov; HK Orange 20; MsHK Žilina; HC 07 Detva; Aigles de Nice; Dizel Penza
- Playing career: 2011–present

Miroslav Macejko (born 9 April 1992) is a Slovak professional ice hockey defenceman who currently playing for HK Dukla Michalovce of the Slovak Extraliga.

Macejko previously played in the Tipsport Liga for HC Košice, HK Orange 20, MsHK Žilina and HC 07 Detva. On 19 May 2018, Macejko moved to France and signed for Aigles de Nice of the Ligue Magnus. On 23 July 2019, he moved to Russia to play with the ice hockey team Dizel Penza in the Supreme Hockey League.

== International play ==
Macejko played in the 2010 IIHF World U18 Championships for Slovakia.

== Career statistics ==
=== Regular season and playoffs ===
| | | | Regular season | | | | | Playoffs |
| Season | Team | League | GP | G | A | Pts | PIM | GP | G | A | Pts | PIM |

=== International ===
| Year | Team | Event | Result | GP | G | A | Pts | PIM |
|---|---|---|---|---|---|---|---|---|
| 2010 | Slovakia | WJC18 | 8th | 6 | 0 | 0 | 0 | 0 |
| Junior totals | | | | 6 | 0 | 0 | 0 | 0 |

== Awards and honours ==
| Award | Year |
Slovak Extraliga
| Champion | 2014, 2015 |
