= Miroslav Glavaš =

Serbian politician (born 1951)

Miroslav Glavaš (Serbian Cyrillic: Мирослав Главаш; born 4 March 1951) is a politician in Serbia. He was briefly recognized as a member of the National Assembly of Serbia in 2002.

== Private career ==
Glavaš is a private entrepreneur. He is from the village of Gajdobra in the municipality of Bačka Palanka, Vojvodina.

== Politician ==
In the 2000 Serbian parliamentary election, Glavaš received the 220nd position out of 250 on the electoral list of the Democratic Opposition of Serbia (DOS), a broad and ideologically diversion coalition opposed to the authoritarian rule of former president Slobodan Milošević. At the time, Glavaš was a member of the League of Social Democrats of Vojvodina (Liga socijaldemokrata Vojvodine, LSV). The list won a majority victory with 176 seats, and Glavaš was not initially given a mandate. (From 2000 to 2011, parliamentary mandates were awarded to sponsoring parties or coalitions rather than to individual candidates, and it was common practice for the mandates to be assigned out of numerical order; Glavaš could have been included in the DOS delegation when the assembly met in January 2001 despite his low position on the list, but he was not.

Several members of the national assembly voluntarily resigned or were deprived of their mandates on 12 June 2002, amid the backdrop of serious divisions between the DOS and the Democratic Party of Serbia (Demokratska stranka Sribje, DSS). Glavaš was awarded a mandate as the replacement for another member and served, in this capacity, as part of the administration's parliamentary majority. The resignations and expulsions of 12 June 2002 were later overturned on a technicality; the delegates who left the assembly on that day had their mandates restored, and the mandates of the replacements were revoked.

Glavaš led his own coalition list for the Bačka Palanka municipal assembly in the 2004 Serbian local elections. He later appeared in the ninth position on the Together for Vojvodina list in the 2008 local elections and the fourth position on a coalition list led by the Serbian Renewal Movement in the 2012 local elections. In each case, the list failed to cross the electoral threshold to win representation in the assembly.
