= Mirosław Mosór =

Polish footballer

Personal information
- Date of birth: 25 February 1968 (age 58)
- Place of birth: Skawina, Poland
- Height: 1.69 m (5 ft 7 in)
- Position: Midfielder

Senior career*
Years	Team	Apps	(Gls)
1987–1996	Ruch Chorzów	167+	(5+)
1997	Wawel Kraków		

Managerial career
- 2003–2004: Rozwój Katowice
- * Club domestic league appearances and goals

Mirosław Mosór (born 25 February 1968) is a Polish former football manager and player who played as a midfielder. He was the chairman of ROW 1964 Rybnik from 2022 to 2023.

== Honours ==
Ruch Chorzów

- Ekstraklasa: 1988–89
- Polish Cup: 1995–96
