= Miroslava Milenović =

Serbian economist

- Мирослава Миленовић
- Born: 11 June 1963 (age 63)
- Education: University of Belgrade
- Occupation: Forensic accounting
- Political party: Enough is Enough (2016-2018)

Miroslava Milenović (Serbian Cyrillic: Мирослава Миленовић, born 11 June 1963) is a Serbian forensic accountant. She also was a member of the Anti-Corruption Council of Serbia from 2012 until her resignation in 2016.

== Early life and education ==
Born on 11 June 1963, she graduated from the Faculty of Geology of the University of Belgrade in 1984. In 2004, she received a certificate of certified specialist in the fight against terrorism and organized crime, at the Faculty of Political Sciences, University of Belgrade.

== Career ==
In 2002, she served as the special adviser of the Minister of Finance Božidar Đelić, mainly in the department for the restructuring of public enterprises.

From 2007, she worked as an expert of the Attorney of Serbia/ Special Prosecutor for Organized Crime, with the recommendation of the United States Department of Justice.

From 2012, she was a member of the Anti-Corruption Council of Serbia. In 2013, she served as the special adviser of the Minister of Economy Saša Radulović.

She was named the 2015 Person of the Year by the OSCE Mission to Serbia, for her contribution to the fight against corruption and for the promotion of freedom of the media. From 2010 to present she is a member of the Board of directors of the Atlantic Council of Serbia

Following her resignation from the position in the Anti-Corruption Council of Serbia, she founded the political party Enough is Enough in 2014 and in 2016 became the vice president of the party. She left the party in 2018 when party from central moved to right nationalist wing.
