= Miroslav Vodehnal =

Czech footballer

Personal information
- Full name: Miroslav Vodehnal
- Date of birth: 25 April 1976 (age 50)
- Place of birth: Pardubice, Czechoslovakia
- Height: 1.84 m (6 ft 1/2 in)
- Position: Forward

Senior career*
Years	Team	Apps	(Gls)
2000–2005	Jablonec	107	(14)
2005	Panachaiki	10	(1)
2005–2006	AEP Paphos		
2006–2007	APOP Kinyras Peyias		
2007–2008	Hradec Králové		
2008	→ Náchod (loan)		
- * Club domestic league appearances and goals

Miroslav Vodehnal (born 25 April 1976) is a former professional footballer who played as a forward for clubs in the Czech Republic, Greece and Cyprus.

== Playing career ==
Vodehnal began his career playing for Czech Gambrinus liga side FK Jablonec 97, appearing in 107 league matches for the club. He moved abroad in January 2005, joining Greek second division side Panachaiki for six months. He spent the next two seasons in the Cypriot second division, helping AEP Paphos F.C. and then APOP Kinyras Peyias FC gain promotion, before returning to the Czech Republic to play for FC Hradec Králové. Towards the end of his playing career he spent time on loan with Náchod.

== Coaching career ==
In 2009 Vodehnal was named head coach of regional championship (fifth tier) side Česká Skalice.
