= Mirosław Małolepszy =

Polish footballer (1955–2022)

Personal information
- Date of birth: 16 June 1955
- Date of death: 14 October 2022 (aged 67)
- Height: 1.83 m (6 ft 0 in)
- Position: Defender

Senior career*
Years	Team	Apps	(Gls)
1973–1980	Raków Częstochowa	133	(56)
1980–1981	Zagłębie Sosnowiec	10	(0)
1981–1982	Skra Częstochowa		
1982–1983	Korona Kielce		
1984	Skra Częstochowa		
- * Club domestic league appearances and goals

Mirosław Małolepszy (16 June 1955 – 14 October 2022) was a Polish footballer who played as a defender for Korona Kielce, Raków Częstochowa, Zagłębie Sosnowiec and Skra Częstochowa.
