= Miroslav Rodić =

Serbian politician (1968–2026)

Miroslav Rodić (Serbian Cyrillic: Мирослав Родић; 8 March 1968 – 23 October 2026) was a Serbian politician. He has served in the municipal government of Bačka Palanka and was a member of the Assembly of Vojvodina from 2016. Once a member of the Democratic Party of Serbia (Demokratska stranka Srbije, DSS), he was later part of the Movement of Socialists (Pokret socijalista, PS).

He is not to be confused with a different Miroslav Rodić from Bačka Palanka, a kayaking expert who has also been involved in local politics.

== Background ==
Rodić lived in Bačka Palanka. He had a background as a mechanical technician and held a bachelor's degree in economics.

Rodić died on 23 October 2026, at the age of 58.

== Politician ==
=== Municipal politics ===
Rodić served a number of terms in the local assembly of Bačka Palanka and at one time was the municipality's deputy mayor. He received the lead position on a shared electoral list of the DSS and New Serbia in the 2008 Serbian local elections and entered the assembly when the list won three mandates. He was chosen as president (i.e., speaker) of the assembly in 2010, after a new municipal government was formed with the DSS and the far-right Serbian Radical Party.

He was given the second position on the DSS list in the 2012 local elections and was re-elected when the list won four mandates. At some time after the election, he left the DSS and joined the PS.

The PS has a stronger presence in Bačka Palanka than in most other parts of Serbia, and it ran its own electoral list in the municipality in the 2020 local elections. Rodić received the (largely ceremonial) final position on the list. Winning election from this position was a mathematical impossibility, and indeed he was not returned when the list won ten out of forty-one mandates.

=== Provincial assembly ===
Rodić received the thirteenth position on the DSS's list in the 2012 Vojvodina provincial election. The list won four mandates, and he was not elected.

The Movement of Socialists has a long-standing alliance with the Serbian Progressive Party at both the republic and provincial levels. Rodić was awarded the seventeenth position on the Progressive list in the 2016 provincial election as a PS candidate and was elected when the list won a majority victory with sixty-three out of 120 mandates.

He was promoted to the ninth position on the Progressive-led Aleksandar Vučić — For Our Children list in the 2020 provincial election and was re-elected when the list won a majority victory with seventy-six mandates. He was later a member of the assembly committee on economy and the committee on youth and sports.
