= Miroslav Juhn =

- Born: July 15, 1897; Podgorač, Austria-Hungary (now Croatia)
- Died: 1941 (aged 43–44); Jadovno concentration camp, Croatia
- Occupation: politician
- Relatives: Mavro (father); Adela (mother); Hinko (brother); Ina Brod (wife)

Miroslav Juhn (July 15, 1897 – 1941) was a Croatian Jewish publicist and politician, and a leading figure of the Praxis School.

== Biography ==
Miroslav Juhn was born on July 15, 1897, in Podgorač, a municipality near Našice, Croatia, to a Jewish family. Juhn finished high school in 1915 in Osijek. During World War I, he was mobilized and taken as a prisoner on the Eastern Front. In 1917, he took part in the Russian Revolution, and lived in Moscow. In 1921, he returned to Yugoslavia and joined the Communist Party of Yugoslavia. From 1922 to 1940, Juhn was a member of the Croatian Journalists' Association and worked for several prominent newspapers. He published discussions about the individual psychology of Alfred Adler from the viewpoint of Manès Sperber. Sperber warned about psychology's social and historical context on the problem of alienation. He assessed man's alienation as a product of the society in the early works of Marx (Književnik, 1934). The politician Božo Kovačević held Sperber to be one of the forerunners of the Praxis School.

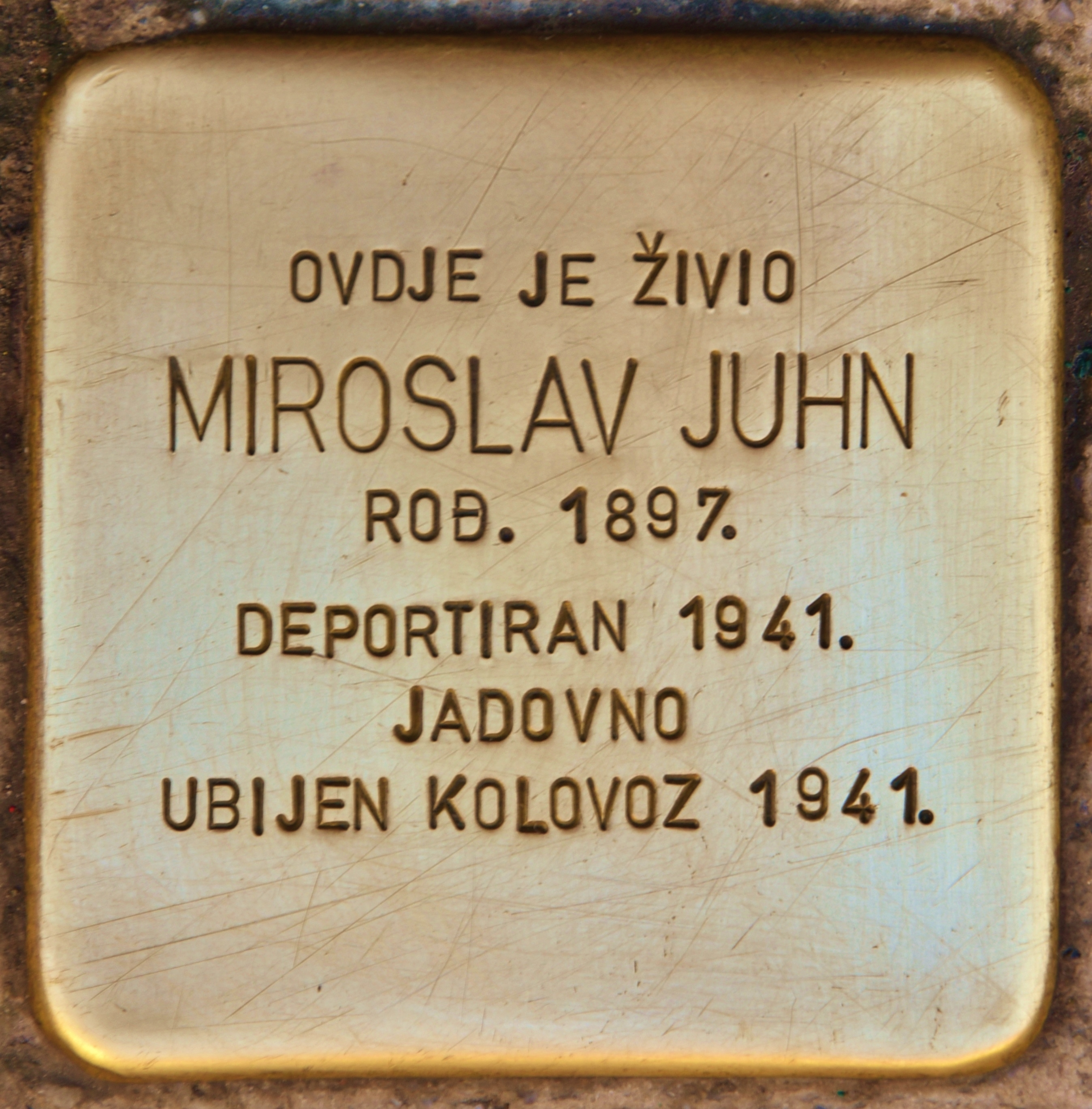
Stolperstein in Zagreb

In 1939 and 1940, he took part in organizing the return of Yugoslav volunteers in the Spanish Civil War. In July 1941, Juhn was arrested and brought to the Jadovno concentration camp, where he was killed in August. Although the communist authorities listed him as a victim of Jadovno, he was officially listed as a victim of the Jasenovac concentration camp.
