= Miroslav Martinjak =

- Born: 1951 (age 73–74); Gornja Voća, Croatia
- Genres: Liturgical
- Occupation(s): Organist, composer, arranger, priest, professor
- Instrument: Pipe organ

Miroslav Martinjak (1951) is a Croatian organist, liturgist, composer, arranger, church musician, Catholic priest and university professor. He is among the most prominent Croatian contemporary composers of liturgical choral music, influenced by Croatian liturgical tradition (Dugan, Vidaković, Klobučar etc.) and Gregorian chant. He is also regens chori of the Zagreb Cathedral.

== Biography ==
He was born on 4 August 1951 in Gornja Voća, where he attended elementary school. He graduated theology in 1976 at the Catholic Faculty of Theology, University of Zagreb. The same year he is ordained as a priest. After two years of pastoral service in Samobor, he studied sacral music at the Pontifical Institute of Sacred Music in Rome, receiving a master's degree in Gregorian chant and bachelor's degrees in sacral composition (Compozicione sacra) and organs (Organo liturgico).

Martinjak is a member of the Committee for Liturgy of the Croatian Bishops' Conference (since 1992) and Conferénce Européenne des Associations de Musique d’Église (since 1995). He was the president of the Institute for sacral music in Zagreb (1996-2012) and, since 2001, the editor-in-chief of the liturgical magazine "Sveta Cecilija" (Saint Cecilia).

== Works ==
=== Music works ===
(selected)

- Hrvatska misa za troglasni zbor i orgulje, 1989
- Misa za troglasni mješoviti zbor, 1989
- Misa brevis, 2005
- Misa novorođenom kralju, 2005

=== Scientific papers ===
(selected)

- Gregorijansko pjevanje baština i vrelo rimske liturgije, Zagreb, 1997.
- Orguljska pratnja gregorijanskih napjeva
- Gregorijanska nadahnuća: Muke po Mateju, Marku, Luki i Ivanu
- Liturgijske skladbe u glazbenom prilogu časopisa sv. Cecilija
