= Miroslav Pupák =

Slovak ice hockey player

- Born: 20 January 1985 (age 41) Nitra, Czechoslovakia
- Height: 5 ft 9 in (175 cm)
- Weight: 185 lb (84 kg; 13 st 3 lb)
- Position: Forward
- Shoots: Left
- Slovak 1. Liga team Former teams: HC Topoľčany; HK Nitra; HK Levice; HC Nové Zámky; MHk 32 Liptovský Mikuláš; HK Spišská Nová Ves; HSC Csíkszereda; ŠHK 37 Piešťany
- Playing career: 2003–present

Miroslav Pupák (born 20 January 1985) is a Slovak professional ice hockey forward for HC Topoľčany of the Slovak 1. Liga.

Pupák has played the majority of his career with his hometown team HK Nitra, playing from 2003 to 2007 and from 2012 up to the present day. He is the team's all-time leader in games played with 659 games up to the end of the 2019–20 season.

Pupák also spent a season with MHk 32 Liptovský Mikuláš as well as a season with HSC Csíkszereda of the MOL Liga and the Romanian Hockey League.
