= Mirosława =

- Pronunciation: [mirɔˈswava]
- Gender: Female
- Language: Polish

Origin
- Meaning: mir 'peace, world' + slav 'glory, celebrate'
- Region of origin: Poland

Other names
- Variant form: Mirosław (m)
- Derived: Miroslava

Mirosława (Polish pronunciation: [mirɔˈswava]) is a Polish feminine dithematic name. It is the feminine form of Mirosław, derived from the Slavic elements mirŭ ('peace, world') and slava ('glory').

== Notable people with the name ==
- Lucyna Mirosława Falkowska (1951–2021), Polish scientist and oceanographer
- Miroslawa Danuta Golos (born 1949), the wife of the former President of Poland Lech Wałęsa
- Mirosława Jastrzębska (born 1921), Polish scientist, ethnographer, and museum curator
- Mirosława Krajewska (born 1940), Polish actress
- Mirosława Litmanowicz (1928–2017), Polish chess player
- Mirosława Makuchowska, Polish LGBT rights activist
- Mirosława Marcheluk (1939–2025), Polish actress
- Mirosława Masłowska (born 1943), Polish politician
- Mirosława Nykiel (born, 1953), Polish politician, manager, and teacher
- Mirosława Ostrowska (born 1969), Polish professor of oceanology
- Mirosława Sagun-Lewandowska (born 1970), Polish sport shooter
- Mirosława Sarna (born 1942), Polish track and field athlete
- Mirosława Stachowiak-Różecka (born 1973), Polish politician
- Mirosława Turowska (born 1962), Polish former paralympic table tennis player
- Mirosława Zakrzewska-Kotula (1932–1985), Polish volleyball, basketball and handball player

== See also ==
- Mirosław (disambiguation)
- Miroslava (given name)
