= Mirosław =

Mirosław may refer to:

- Mirosław (given name), a Polish given name of Slavic origin
- Mirosław, Masovian Voivodeship (east-central Poland)
- Mirosław, Greater Poland Voivodeship (west-central Poland)

== See also ==
- Miroslav (given name), the Slavic name upon which Mirosław is based
