= Jan Husarik =

Serbian politician

Jan Husarik (Serbian Cyrillic: Јан Хусарик; born 22 December 1961) is a politician in Serbia from the country's Slovak community. He has been a member of the National Assembly of Serbia and the Assembly of Serbia and Montenegro, and from 2015 to 2016 he was the mayor of Kovačica. At one time a member of G17 Plus, he later joined the Serbian Progressive Party (Srpska napredna stranka, SNS).

== Private career ==
Husarik is a graduated engineer of agronomy. He lives in Kovačica.

== Politician ==
=== Early years ===
Husarik was elected to the Kovačica municipal assembly in the 2000 Serbian local elections as a member of the Democratic Opposition of Serbia (Demokratska opozicija Srbije, DOS), a broad and ideologically diverse coalition of parties opposed to Slobodan Milošević's regime. The DOS won a majority victory in the municipality, and Husarik supported the local government in the assembly. G17 Plus became a political party during this term, and he became a member of the organization.

=== Parliamentarian ===
Husarik appeared in the 242nd position out of 250 on G17 Plus's electoral list in the 2003 Serbian parliamentary election. The list won thirty-four seats, and he was included in his party's delegation when the assembly convened in January 2004. (From 2000 to 2011, mandates in Serbian parliamentary elections were awarded to sponsoring parties or coalitions rather than individual candidates, and it was common practice for the mandates to be assigned out of numerical order. The G17 Plus list was in any event mostly alphabetical; the letter "H" appears toward the end of the Serbian alphabet, and Husarik's specific list position had no bearing on his chances of election.)

By virtue of its performance in the 2003 election, G17 Plus had the right to appoint twelve members to the federal assembly of Serbia and Montenegro in February 2004. Husarik was included in the party's delegation and so was required to resign his seat in the national assembly. While serving in the federal assembly, he was also part of Serbia and Montenegro's delegation to the Parliamentary Assembly of the Black Sea Economic Cooperation (PABSEC). In September 2005, he oversaw a display of Slovak folkways art in Kovačica that was organized by PABSEC.

The federal assembly ceased to exist in 2006, after Montenegro declared independence. Husarik again appeared on G17 Plus's list in the 2007 Serbian parliamentary election and was not given a new mandate when the list fell to nineteen seats.

=== Local and provincial politics since 2012 ===
Serbia's electoral system was reformed in 2011, such that all mandates were awarded to candidates on successful lists in numerical order.

After leaving the federal assembly, Husarik joined a local political party called Zelena Jabuka (English: Green Apple). He appeared in the lead position on the party's list for Kovačica in the 2012 local elections and was elected when the list won three seats. He also ran for the Assembly of Vojvodina in the concurrent 2012 provincial election and was defeated in Kovačica's constituency seat.

He later joined the Serbian Progressive Party. A new coalition government came to power in Kovačica in October 2015, and he was chosen for a term as the municipality's new mayor.

Husarik was given the eighth position on the SNS's list for Kovačica in the 2016 local elections and was re-elected when the list won a majority victory with twenty-one out of thirty-nine mandates. When the new local assembly convened, he was reassigned as deputy mayor. He also appeared in the ninety-sixth position on the SNS list in the concurrent provincial election (the first provincial vote in Vojvodina to be held under full proportional representation) and was not elected when the list won sixty-three seats.

On 12 April 2018, he was replaced as deputy mayor by Jaroslav Hrubik.

== Electoral record ==
=== Provincial (Vojvodina) ===
2012 Vojvodina provincial election: Kovačica
Candidate	Party	First round		Second round	
Candidate	Party	Votes	%	Votes	%
Martin Zloh (incumbent)	Choice for a Better Vojvodina–Bojan Pajtic (Affiliation: Democratic Party)	3,920	33.67	6,447	64.49
Živojin Matejić	Let's Get Vojvodina Moving–Tomislav Nikolić (Serbian Progressive Party, New Serbia, Movement of Socialists, Strength of Serbia Movement)	2,105	18.08	3,550	35.51
Jan Husarik	Citizens' Group: Green Apple	1,493	12.83		
Jan Paul	All Together Against the Construction of an Asbestos Processing Factory–Slovak Party Jan Paul	1,278	10.98		
Milorad Đukić	League of Social Democrats of Vojvodina–Nenad Čanak	964	8.28		
Ranko Stojanović	SPS, PUPS, JS, SDP Serbia	710	6.10		
Stevan Diklić	Serbian Radical Party	655	5.63		
Dušanka Petrak	U-Turn Liberal Democratic Party–Vojvodina's Party	516	4.43		
Total		11,641	100.00	9,997	100.00
