= Miroslav Španović =

Miroslav Španović (Serbian Cyrillic: Мирослав Шпановић; born 18 May 1949) is a politician and retired military official in Serbia. He has served in the Assembly of Vojvodina since 2012 as a member of the Party of United Pensioners of Serbia (PUPS).

== Private life ==
Španović is a retired colonel. He lives in Novi Sad.

== Politician ==
The PUPS contested the 2007 Serbian parliamentary election in an alliance with the Social Democratic Party, and Španović received a position on their combined electoral list. The list did not cross the electoral threshold to win representation in the national assembly. The United Pensioners subsequently formed an alliance with the Socialist Party of Serbia at both the republic and the provincial level, and Španović appeared in the second position on the Socialist-led electoral list in the 2012 Vojvodina provincial election. He was elected when the list won nine proportional mandates. The election was won by the Democratic Party and its allies, and Španović served in opposition for the next four years.

For the 2016 provincial election, the PUPS formed a new alliance with the Serbian Progressive Party. Španović received the eighth position on the latter's Aleksandar Vučić – Serbia Is Winning list and was re-elected when the list won a majority victory with sixty-three out of 120 mandates. He was appointed as head of the assembly's security committee after the election and, in this role, took part in a number of nationally televised forums on security issues.

In 2019, Španović called for a public discussion on the best system for adjusting pensions to account for inflation and wage growth. He said that he did not necessarily oppose the "Swiss model" approach favoured by Siniša Mali but wanted to ensure a proper consideration of the issue.

He was given the seventh position on the Progressive Party's coalition list in the 2020 provincial election and was elected to a third term when the list won an increased majority with seventy-six mandates. He is now a member of the committee on security and the committee on national equality.

Španović is the leader of the PUPS provincial board in Vojvodina.
