= Miroslav Milošević =

Miroslav Milošević may refer to:

- Miroslav Milošević (footballer, born 1975)
- Miroslav Milošević (footballer, born 1976)
- Miroslav Milošević (footballer, born 1985)
- Miroslav Milošević (footballer, born 1986)
