= Miroslav Nešković =

Serbian politician (1953–2020)

Miroslav Nešković (Serbian Cyrillic: Мирослав Нешковић; 23 March 1953 – 30 October 2020) was a politician in Serbia. He served in the National Assembly of Serbia from 1994 to 2001 and was also active in the local politics of Bajina Bašta. Nešković was a member of the far-right Serbian Radical Party (Srpska radikalna stranka, SRS).

== Early life and private career ==
Nešković was born in the village of Bioska (now in Užice), in what was then the People's Republic of Serbia in the Federal People's Republic of Yugoslavia. He graduated from the University of Belgrade Faculty of Dentistry and worked as a dentist at the Bajina Bašta health center, later serving for several years as director of the institution.

== Politician ==
=== Parliamentarian ===
Nešković joined the Radical Party on its founding in 1991. He appeared in the fourth position on the party's electoral list for the Užice division in the 1993 Serbian parliamentary election and was given a mandate when the list won four seats in the division. (From 1992 to 2000, Serbia's electoral law stipulated that one-third of parliamentary mandates would be assigned to candidates from successful lists in numerical order, while the remaining two-thirds would be distributed amongst other candidates at the discretion of the sponsoring parties. Nešković's position on the list did not give him the automatic right to a seat in parliament, though he was awarded a mandate all the same). He took his seat when the assembly convened in January 1994. The Socialist Party of Serbia (Socijalistička partija Srbije, SPS) and its allies won the election, and the Radicals served for the next four years in opposition.

In the 1997 Serbian parliamentary election, Nešković was given the lead position on the SRS's list for a smaller, redistributed Užice division and was re-elected when the list won three mandates. The SPS and its allies once again won the election. The Socialists formed a coalition government with the Radical Party and the Yugoslav Left (Jugoslovenska Levica, JUL) in early 1998, and Nešković served as a supporter of the administration until the government fell in October 2000.

Serbia's electoral laws were reformed in the buildup to the 2000 parliamentary election, such that the entire country was counted as a single electoral division and all mandates were awarded to candidates at the discretion of the sponsoring parties and coalitions, irrespective of numerical order. Nešković was given the 142nd position on the Radical Party's list and did not receive a mandate for a third term when the list won only twenty-three mandates. His parliamentary term ended in early 2001.

Serbia's electoral laws were again changed in 2011, such that all mandates were awarded to candidates on successful lists in numerical order. Nešković appeared in the 205th position on the SRS's list in the 2012 parliamentary election. This was too low for election to be a realistic prospect; the party did not, in any event, cross the electoral threshold to win representation in the assembly. He was given the 119th position in the 2014 election, in which the party again did not cross the threshold.

=== Local politics ===
Nešković was president of the Radical Party's municipal board in Bajina Bašta for several years. He ran for the fourth division in Bajina Bašta's municipal assembly in the 2000 Serbian local elections. It is not clear from online sources if he was elected; the Radicals won only one seat out of forty-one in that year's local cycle. (This was the last regular local election cycle in which members were elected for single-member constituencies; subsequent local elections have been held under proportional representation.)

Nešković was elected to the local assembly at the head of the SRS list in the 2004 local elections and was re-elected in the 2008 local elections. A coalition led by the DS initially took power in the municipality after the 2008 vote, but in April 2011 the defection of two government supporters resulted in the Radicals forming government in an alliance with the Democratic Party of Serbia (Demokratska stranka Srbije, DSS). Nešković was chosen as president (i.e., speaker) of the assembly. He was re-elected in the 2012 local elections; the Radicals later formed a somewhat unusual local government with both the DSS and the DS, and Nešković stood down as speaker.

He led the SRS list in the 2016 local elections and was re-elected when the list won three seats. In the 2020 local elections, he appeared sixth and was not re-elected when the Radicals fell to two mandates.

For several years, Nešković was involved in a friendly rivalry with Zvonko Zarić, a local supporter of the Democratic Party (Demokratska stranka, DS), as to which party would receive the most votes in Serbian elections at the republic level. The loser was required to pay for a feast that would be attended by prominent local supporters of both parties.

== Death ==
Nešković died on 30 October 2020 after a short illness.
