= Miroslav Štolfa =

Czech painter (1930–2018)

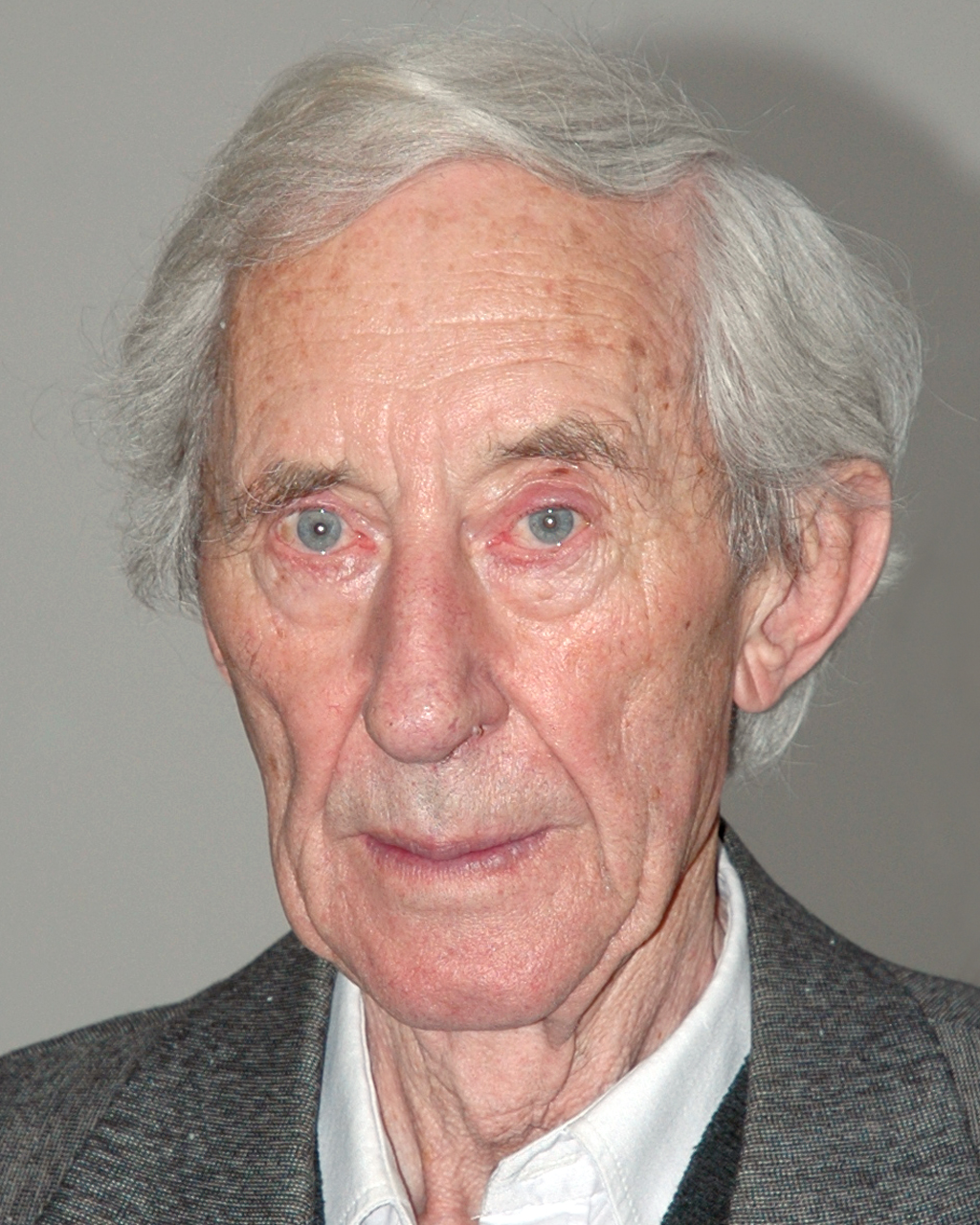
Miroslav Štolfa (2013)

Miroslav Štolfa (11 August 1930, in Brno – 26 February 2018, in Brno) was a Czech painter, printmaker, and university lecturer.

== Life ==
Miroslav Štolfa achieved his A-levels at grammar school in Brno-Husovice and between 1949 and 1953 studied art (taught by Prof. E. Milén, B. S. Urban, and V. Makovský) at the Faculty of Education at Masaryk University and history at the Faculty of Arts (taught by Prof. F. Stiebitz, J. Macůrek, and R. Holinka).

After completing his studies, Štolfa focused on painting and teaching at pedagogical schools in Boskovice, Tišnov, and Brno. In 1955 he married his fiancée Věra; they had a son, Jaromír and a daughter, Jana. In the same year, his first solo exhibition took place in the Education Employees Club in Brno.

In 1963 he co-founded the creative group Parabola which was gradually joined by a number of important Brno artists (A. Čalkovský, R. Fila, R. Hliněnský, D. Chatrný, J. Jankovič, Z. Macháček, E. Ovčáček, M. Urbásek, D. Valocký, K. Veleba, V. Zykmund, and others). Václav Zykmund was both group theorist and spokesperson.

At that time Miroslav Štolfa was teaching at the Department of Art Theory and Education at the Faculty of Arts at Palacký University in Olomouc. In 1966, he was named an assistant professor in painting on basis of his degree.

During the 1960s, Štolfa undertook several foreign study trips (Belgium, France, Italy, the Netherlands, Hungary, Germany, Poland, Austria, and Spain). Between 1978 and 1983, he taught drawing and painting at the Department of Aesthetic Education at the Faculty of Education at Jan Evangelista Purkyně University in Brno (now Masaryk University). From 1979 he was an assistant professor there. At the age of 53, he left his pedagogical activities and from then on he devoted himself exclusively to his own works of art.

In 1990, Štolfa co-founded the artists’ association “TT klub” whose members were not only artists born in the 1950s but also a few art theorists (R. Horáček, J. Valoch, I. Zhoř). In 1992, he participated in the founding of the Institute of Fine Arts at the Faculty of Architecture, Brno University of Technology and until 1993 he was head of the newly established painter’s studio.

Štolfa’s body of work includes an extensive collection of paintings and drawings based on a thorough knowledge of avant-garde movements. The importance of his work grew beyond the borders of his own region. Throughout his life, he arranged 50 solo exhibitions and participated in 170 collective exhibitions, of which more than 70 were abroad. Miroslav Štolfa lived and worked in Brno.

== Work ==
Miroslav Štolfa had painted since his early childhood and he was interested in the periphery of Brno with a marshalling yard, the Masaryk circuit and the unspoiled landscape of the Vysočina region from which his ancestors had come from. During his studies, he was greatly influenced by the Group 42 and Cubist movements.

In his first creative phase, Štolfa painted recesses of the city of Brno with subdued colours, but his affinity to machines and technical civilization soon prevailed, which was also reflected in his paintings of the 1950s and 1960s. At that time, he was fascinated by the ambience of motor racing and motorcycles (The Racing Driver, The Depot, The Engine cycles of pictures), cars and airplanes. Later he was also riveted by large industrial buildings (the Power Stations cycle of pictures). He gradually broke away from a compilation of civilizational and technical forms and symbols which was an original theme of the cycles of pictures, and from the real environment, and by the end of the 1960s, he reached an abstract way of expression and exploration of general relationships, forces and movements.

In the 1970s, besides painting, Štolfa devoted himself also to black and white large-format charcoal and ink drawings depicting fictitious mechanical devices and their components. From the beginning of the 1980s, there appeared featured stylized figures in his paintings too, such as those marked by racing overalls.

In 1981, Štolfa started working on the cycle of images named The New Nature. In his artistic reflection, technology had become a decisive factor that had shaped the environment to be pictured. The painter considered the opportunities offered by technology to humans as well as its dark side which is accompanied by a catastrophe caused by its misuse. This cycle of 35 paintings was exhibited at the House of Arts in Brno in 1984 and the title The New Nature has become the common name for other exhibitions dealing with civilizational themes.

Also in other cycles of paintings focusing on landscape, technology is depicted as an element of art or a metaphor. Nevertheless, this inspiration was shifted to the level of general features, and the paintings were dominated by rational reflection and artistic sensitivity (the Horizons, Painting Studios, Signals, Landscape of Machine Hoods, Movements in the Landscape, and Vistas cycles).

From the end of the 1990s, Štolfa’s work became less concrete when displaying reality. His paintings gained a meditative character; referring to oppressive aspects of human existence (The Victim, 2002, A Memento, 2007), indicating feelings of loneliness (A Hermit, 2009) or showing the theme of a rebellion and a fall (The Story of Icarus, 2011). In some of his other paintings he came back to the symbols of buildings and stations of the periphery of Brno (The Landscape of My Childhood).

The work of Miroslav Štolfa presents the entire aspects of technical civilization, from hope and admiration to negative consequences for the environment, the loss of illusions, and feelings of alienation. Nevertheless, his work also offers hope and better prospects with the inclination to meditative motifs and the reflection of the invisible.

=== Paintings ===
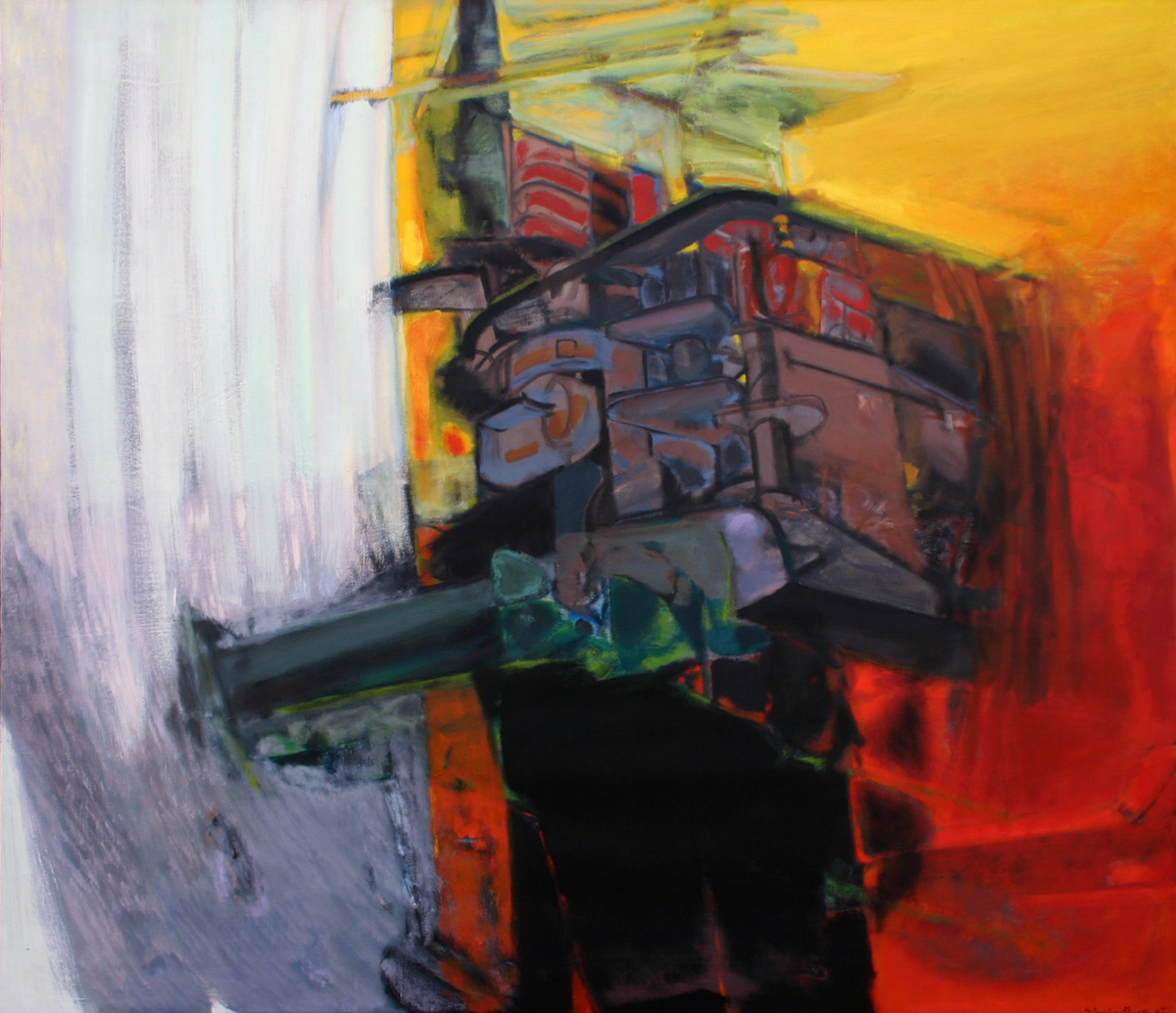
Memento, 1980

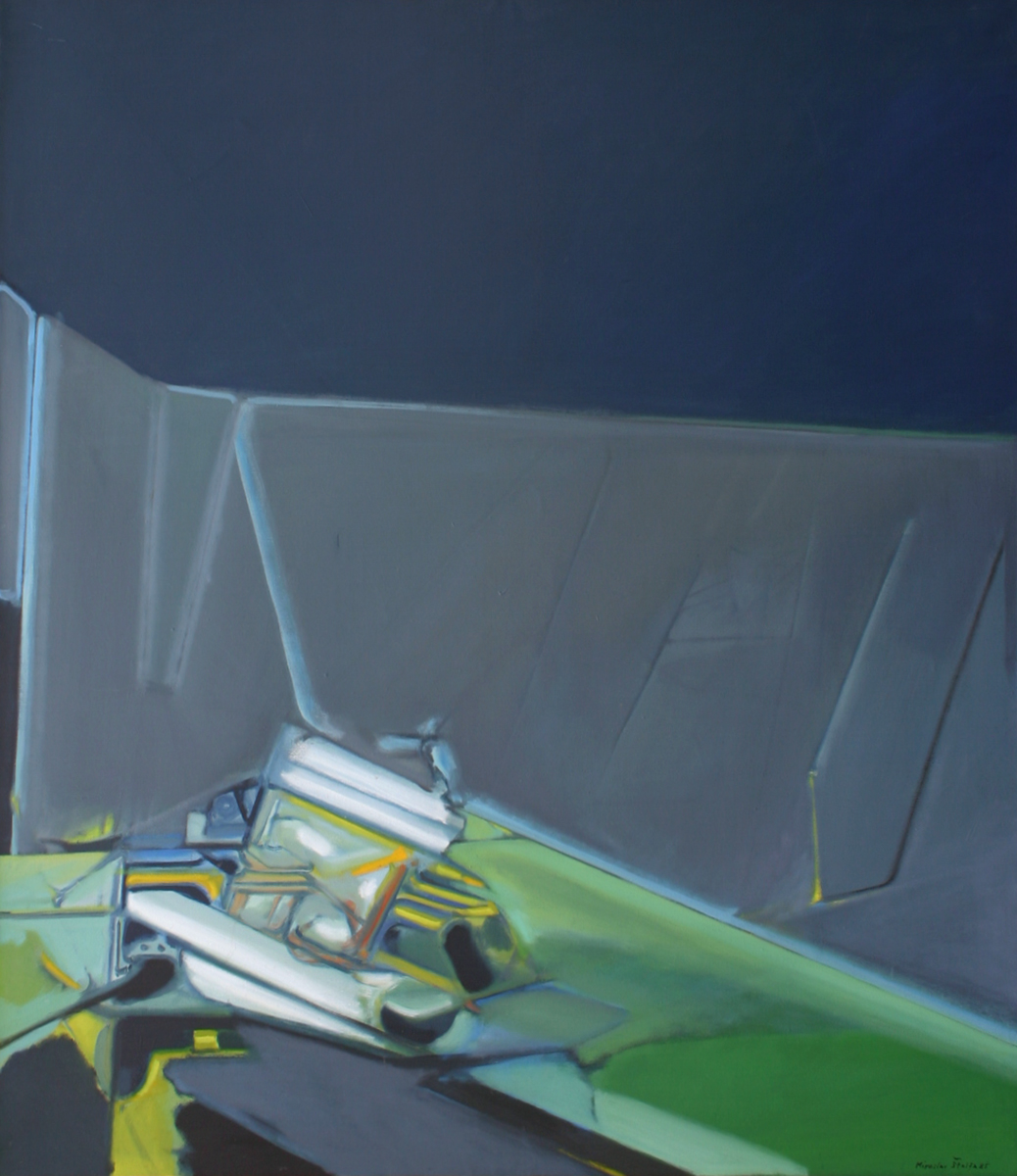
New Nature, 1985

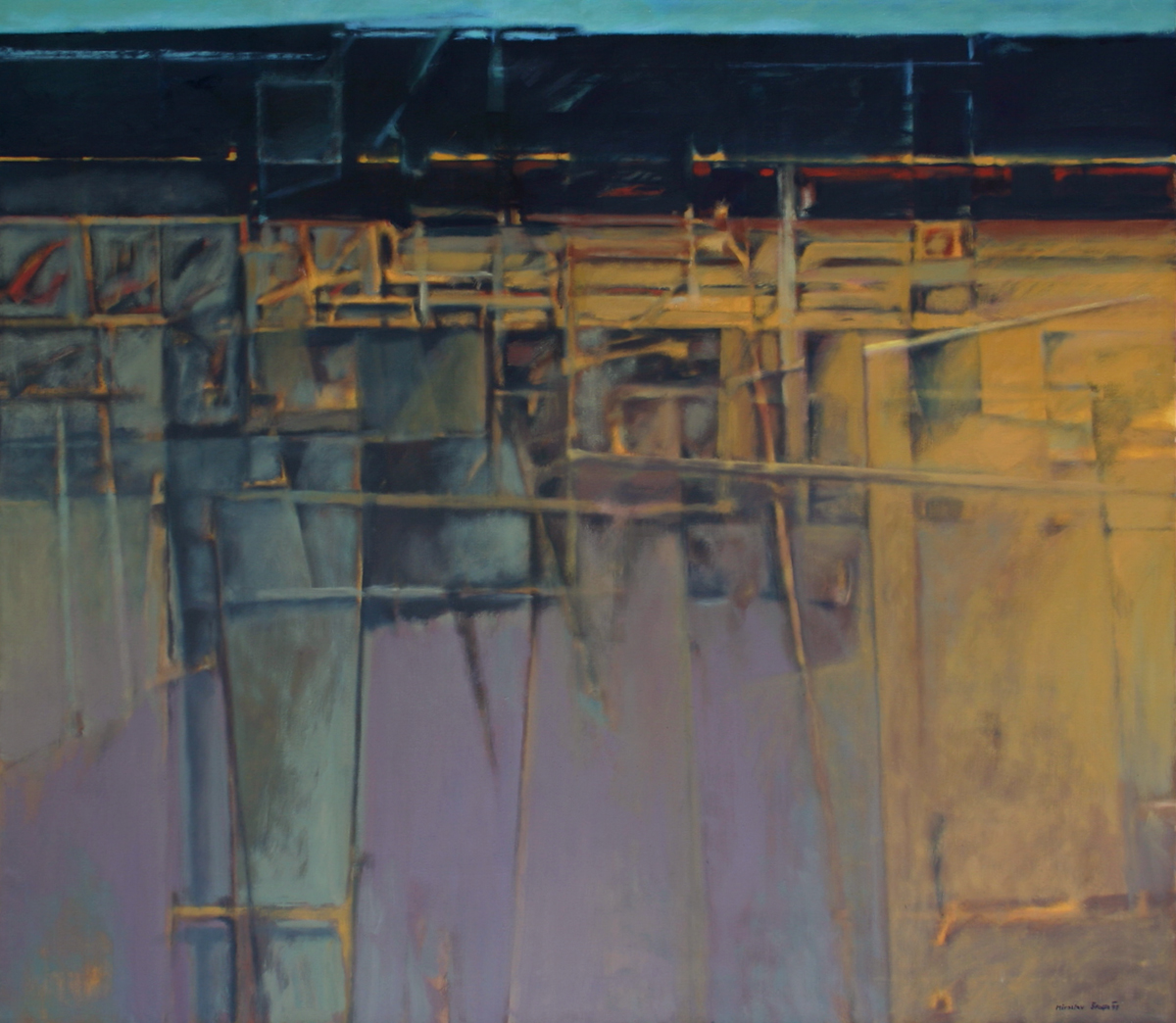
Double horizon, 1997

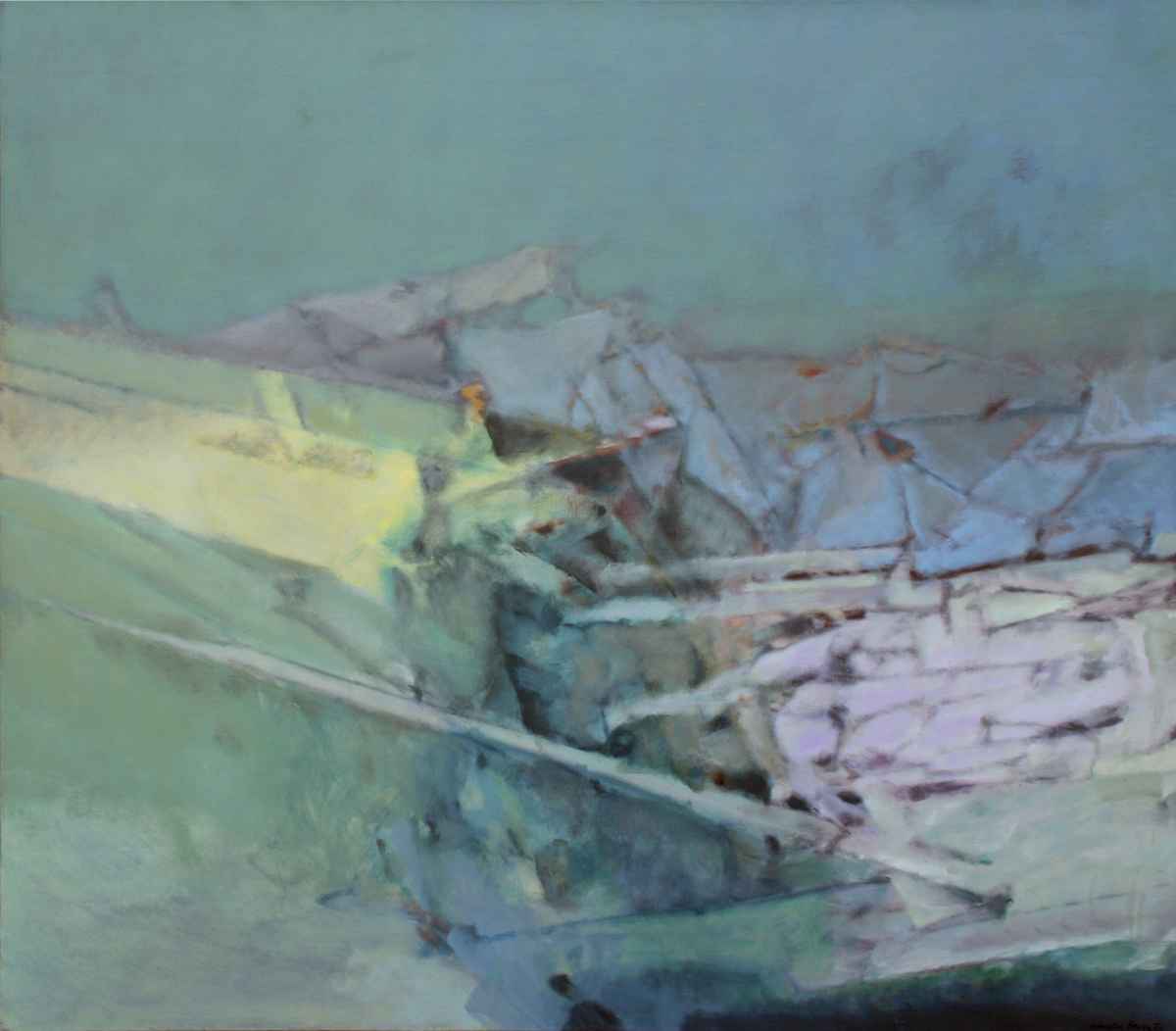
Misted horizon, 2000

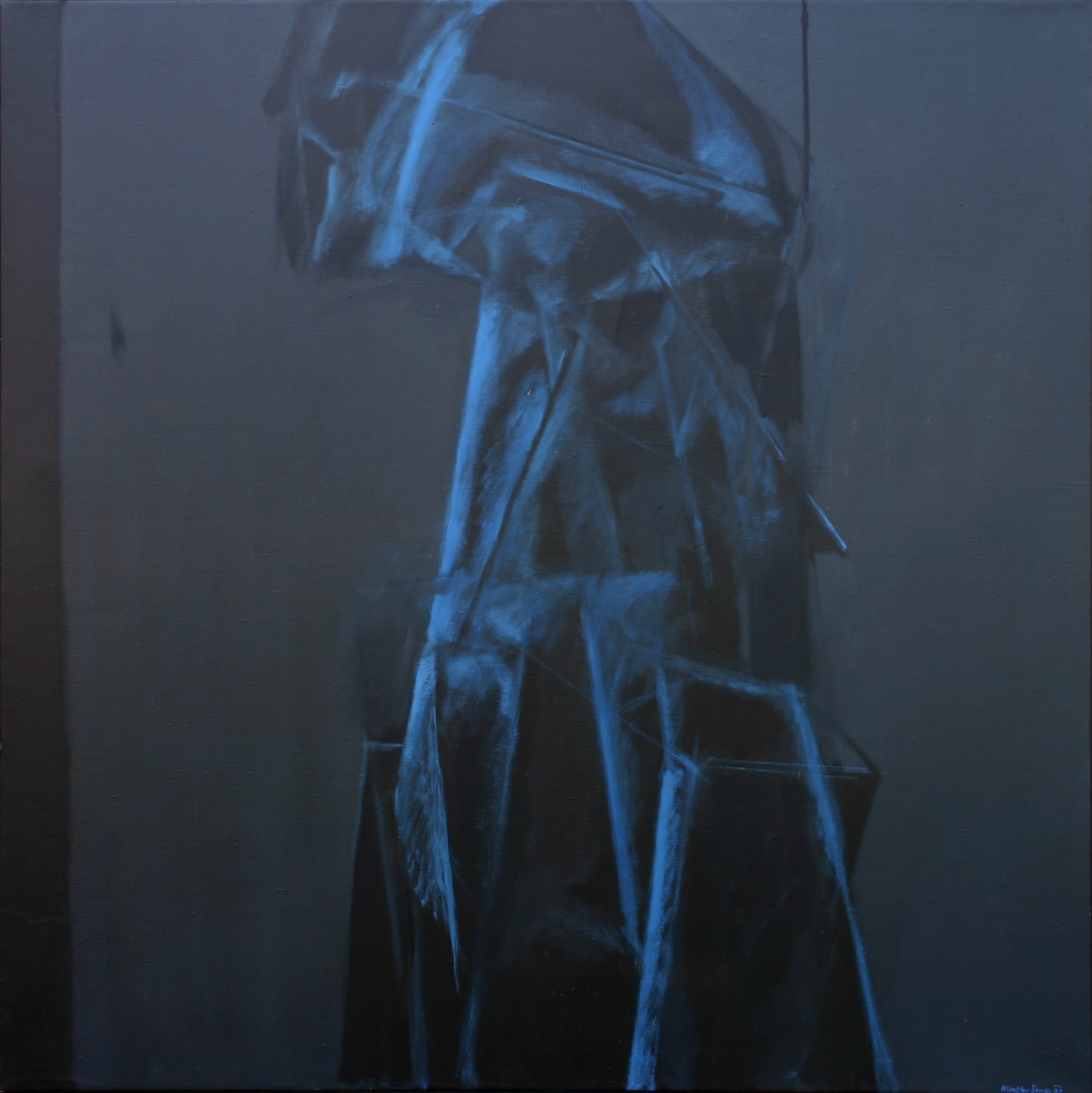
Big torso, 2002

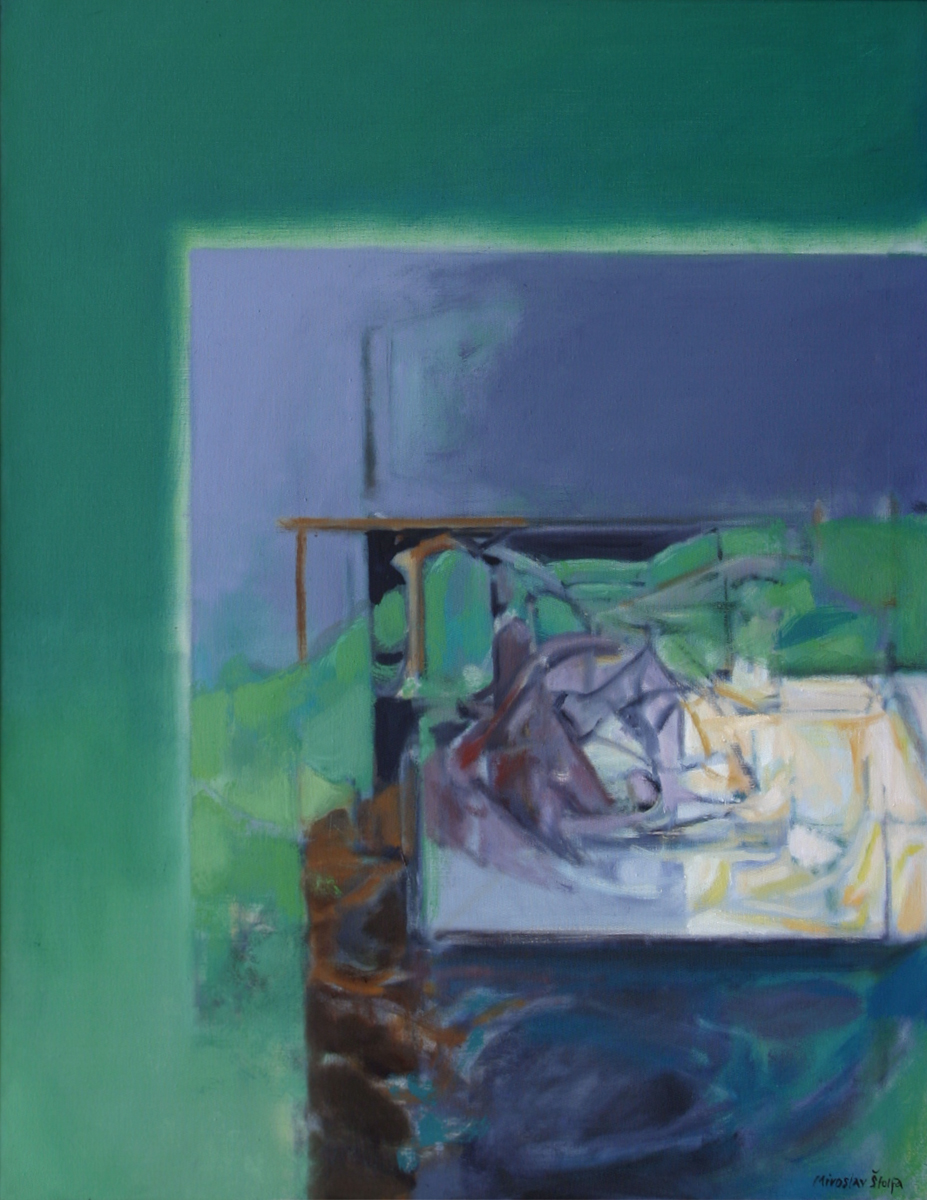
Metaphysical still life VI, 2012

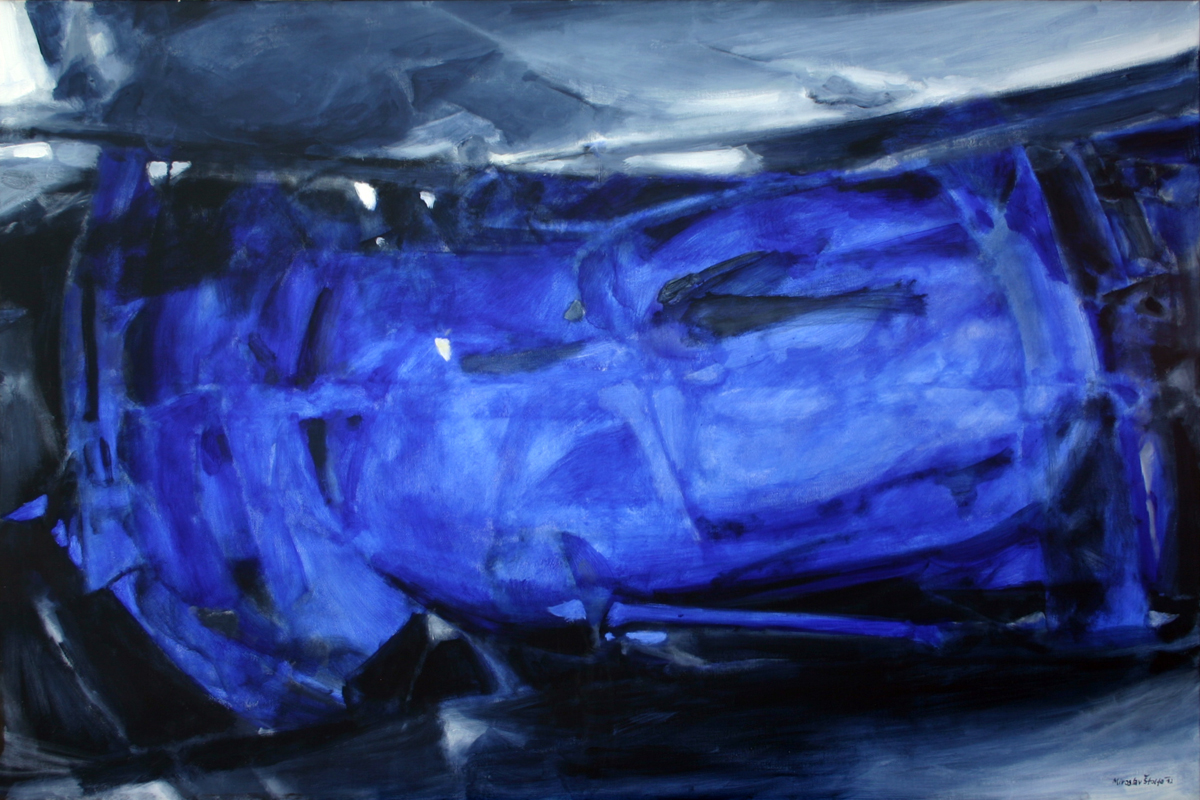
Ascent of Blue, 2012

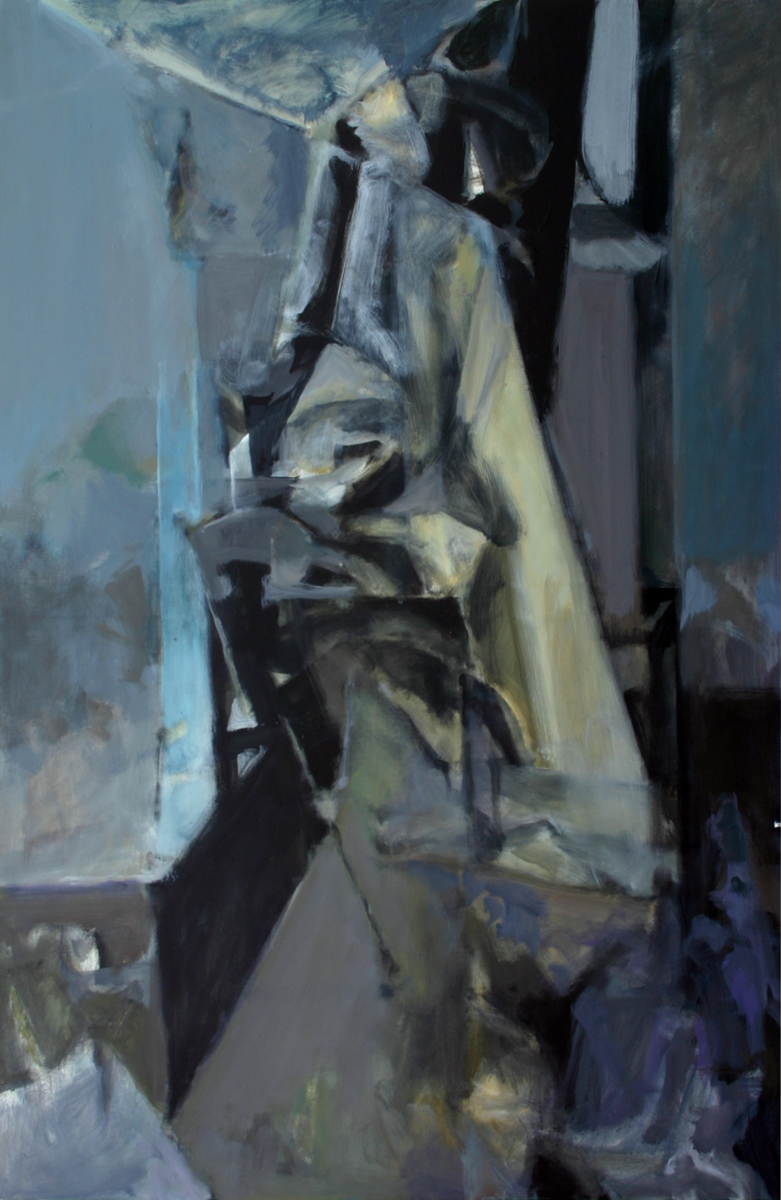
On the theme of figure, 2013

=== Drawings ===
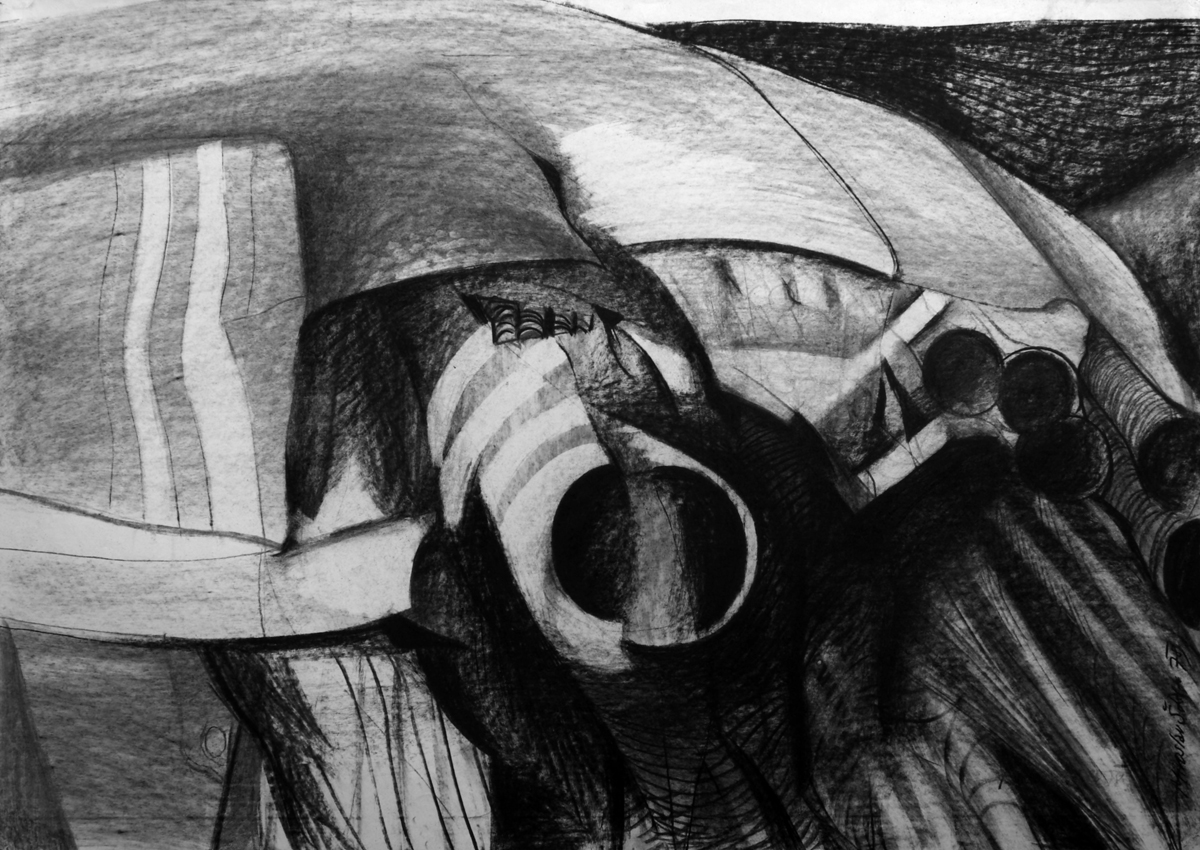
Hooding, 1978, charcoal 61 x 86 cm

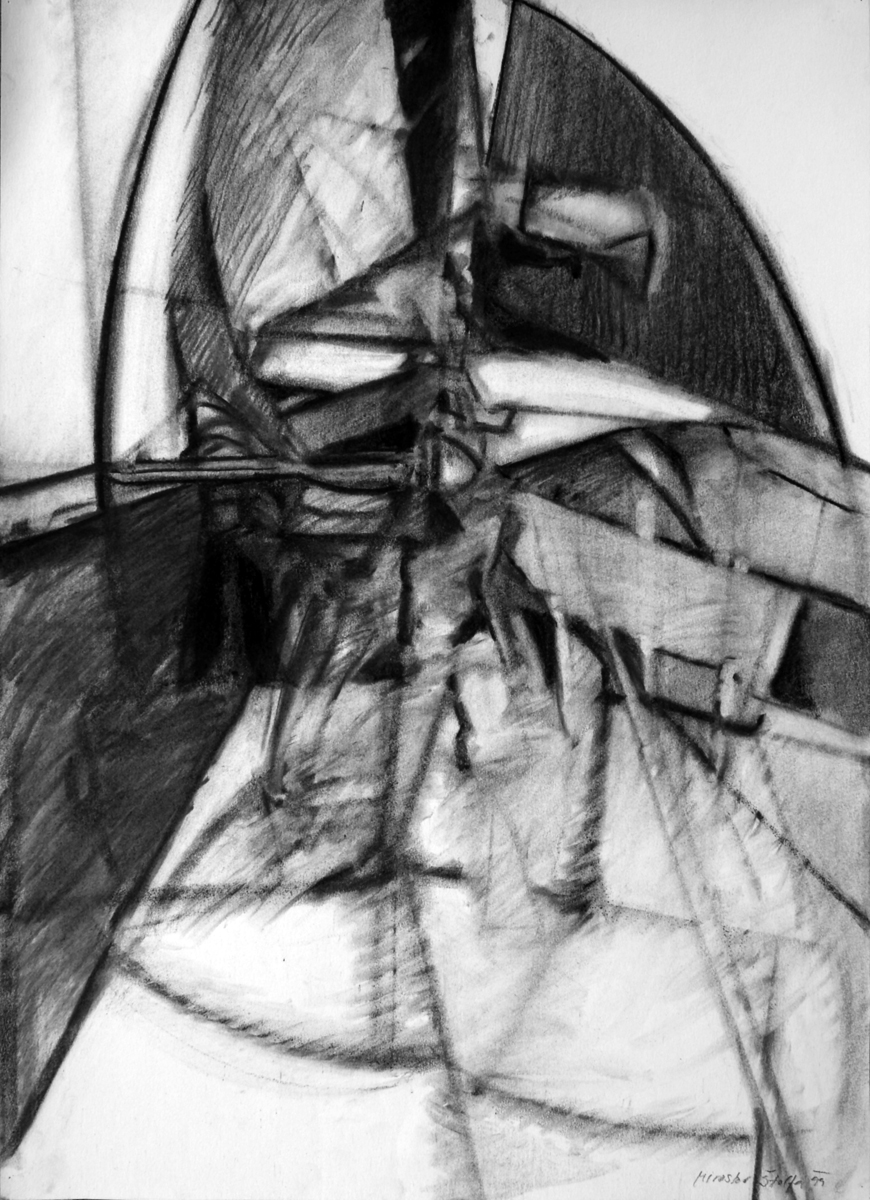
No name, 1986, charcoal, 86 x 61 cm

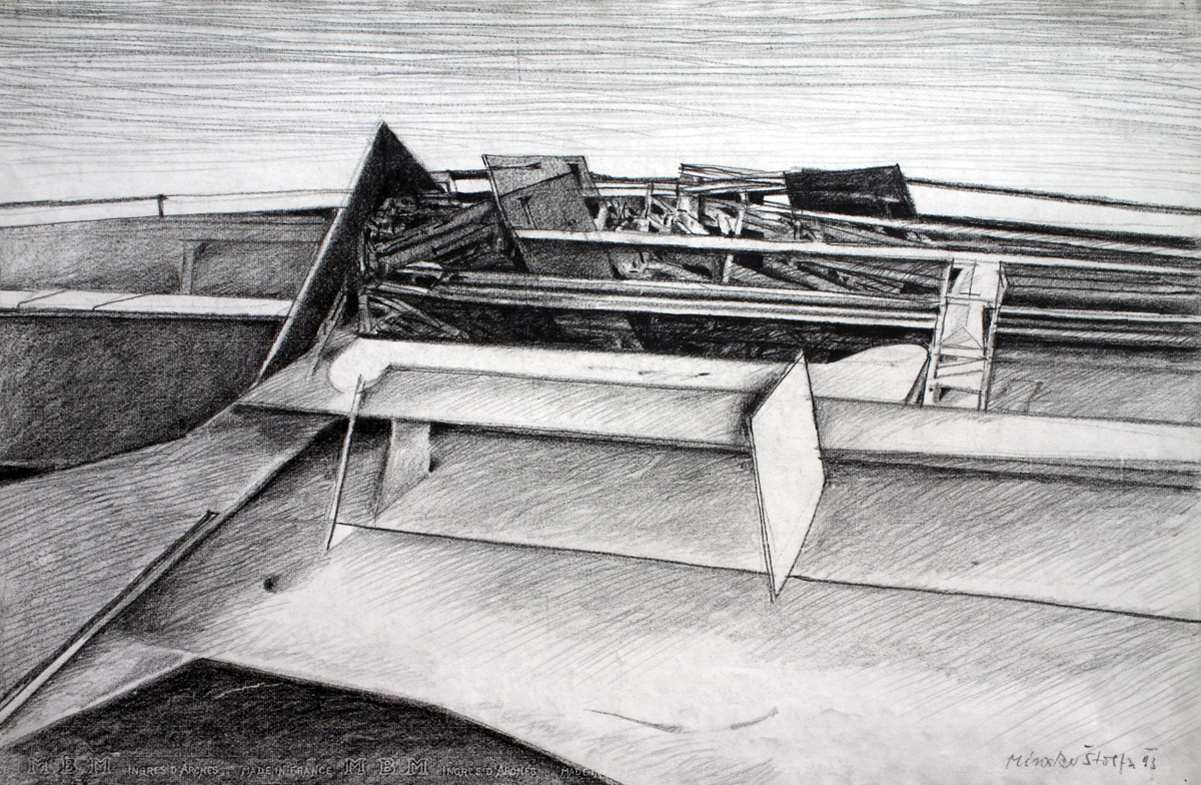
Hooded countryside, 1993, charcoal, 65 x 100 cm

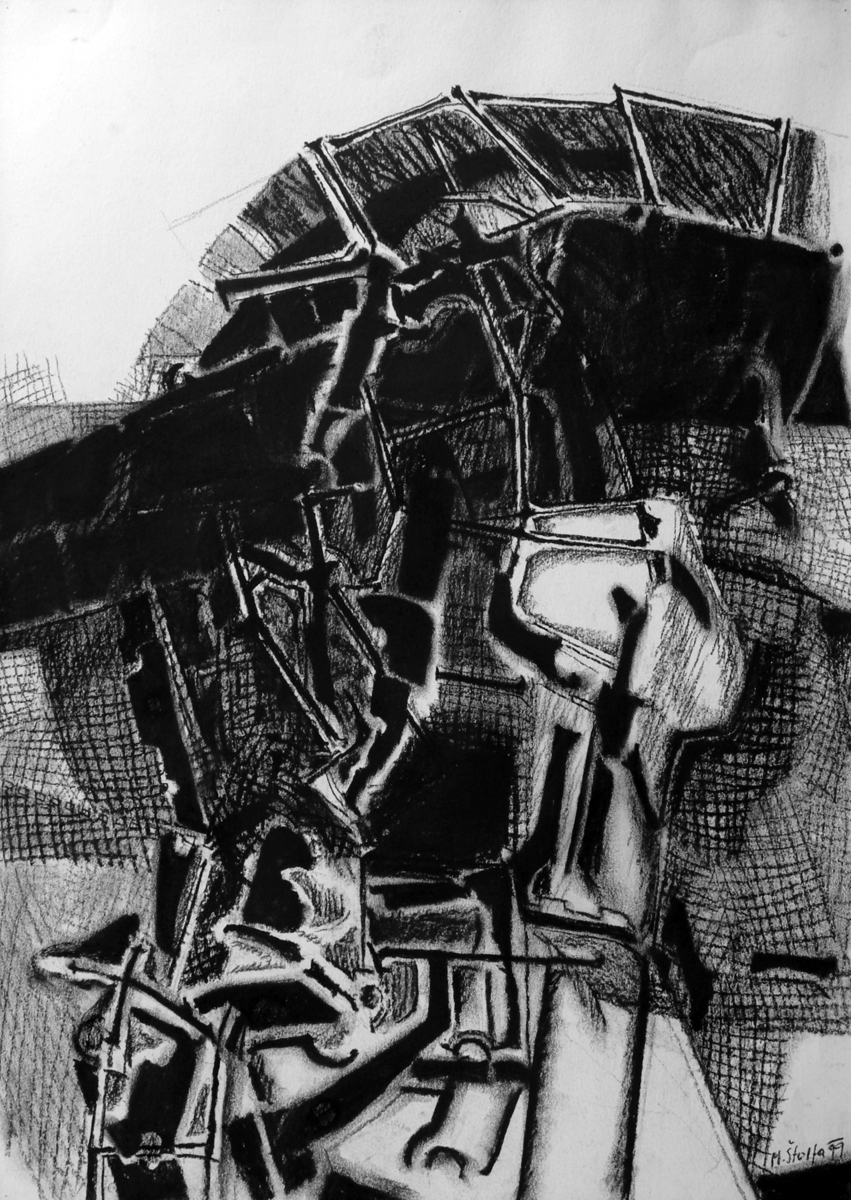
New Nature, 1999, charcoal, 86 x 61 cm

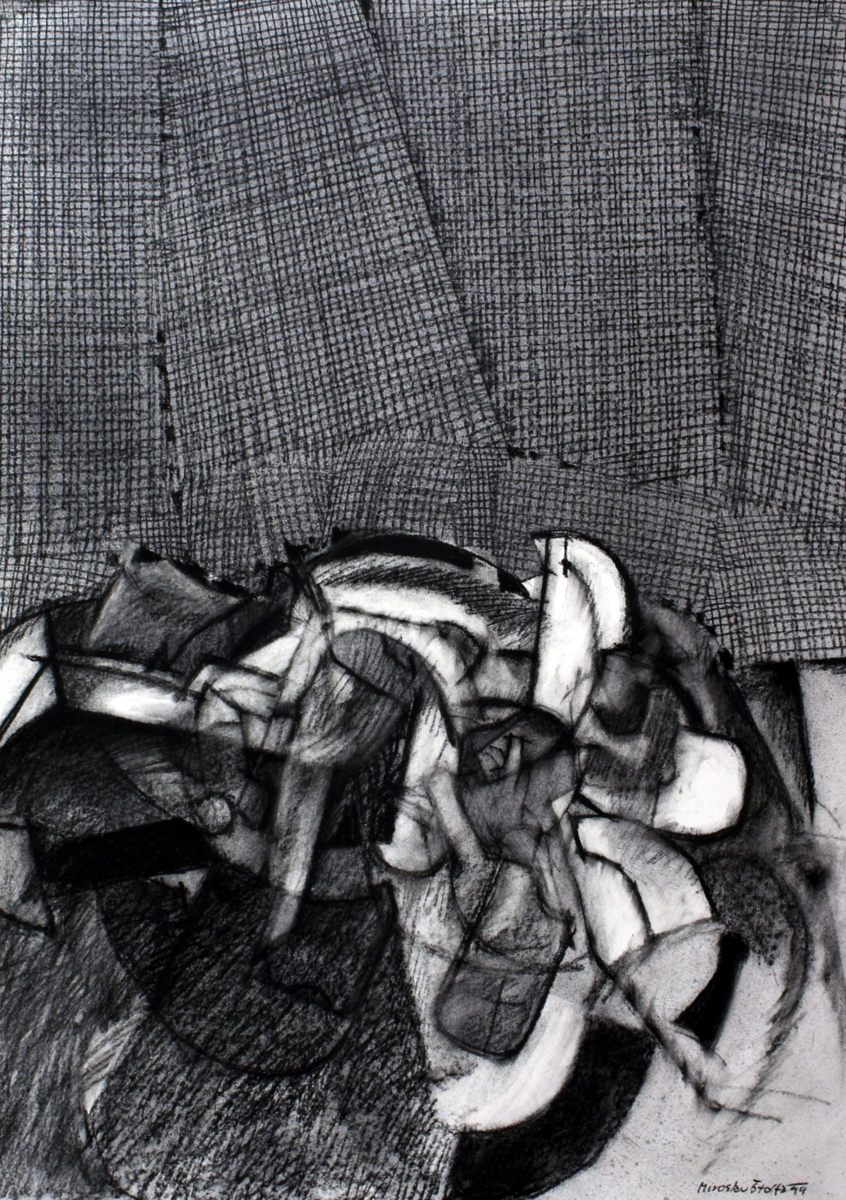
Start of traffic, 1999, charcoal, 86 x 61 cm

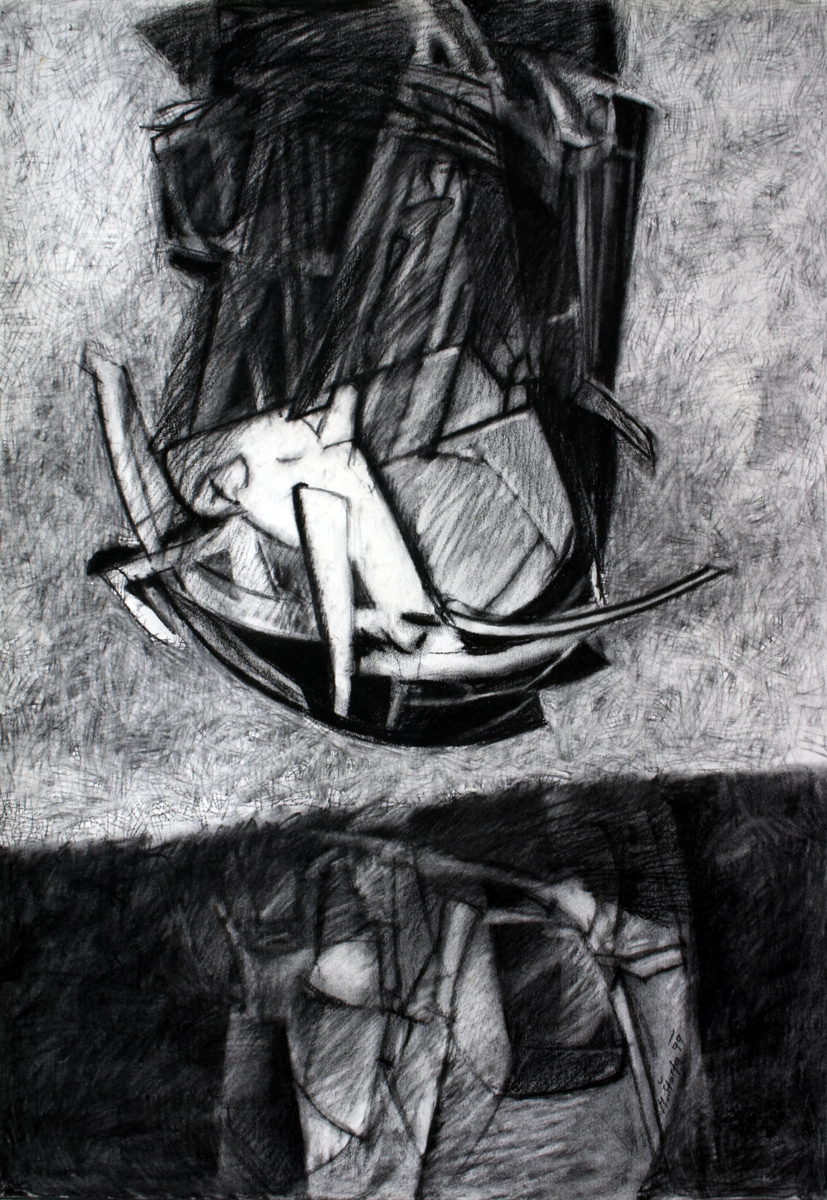
Fatum, 1999, charcoal, 100 x 70 cm

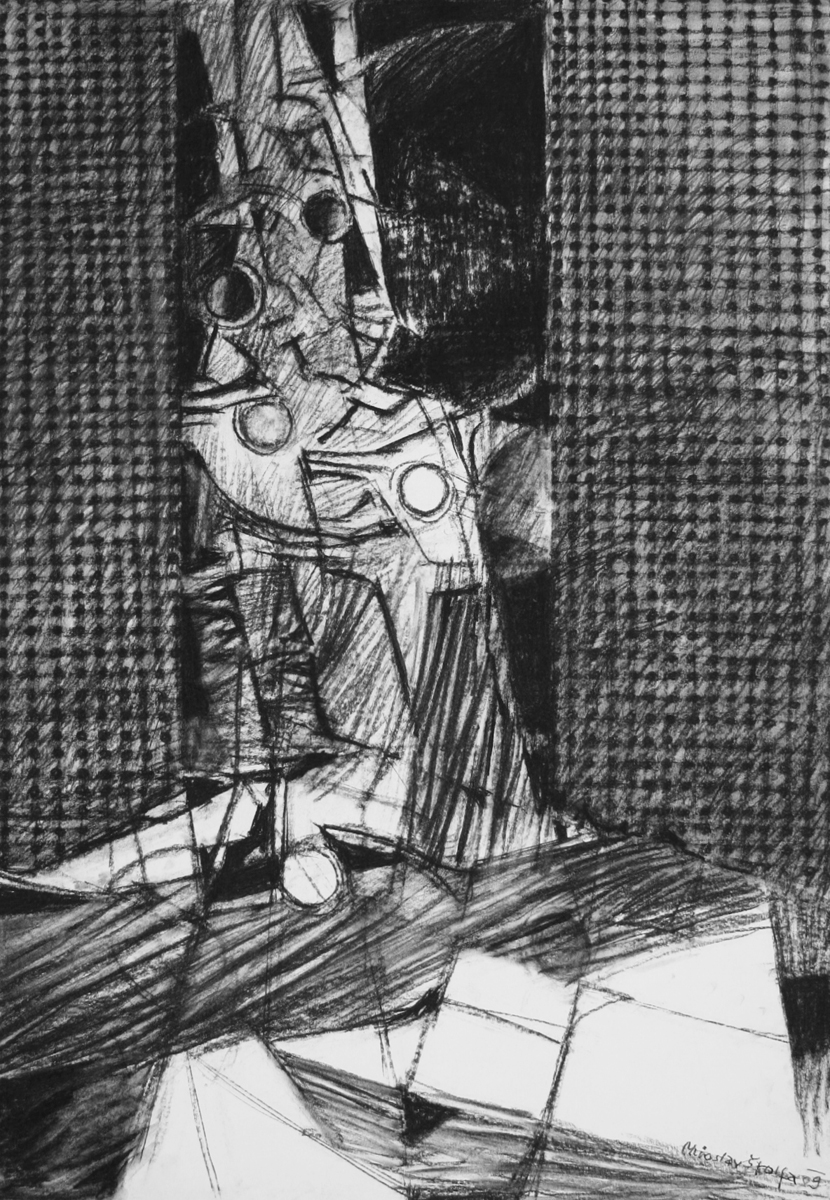
Visitor, 2009, charcoal, 100 x 70 cm

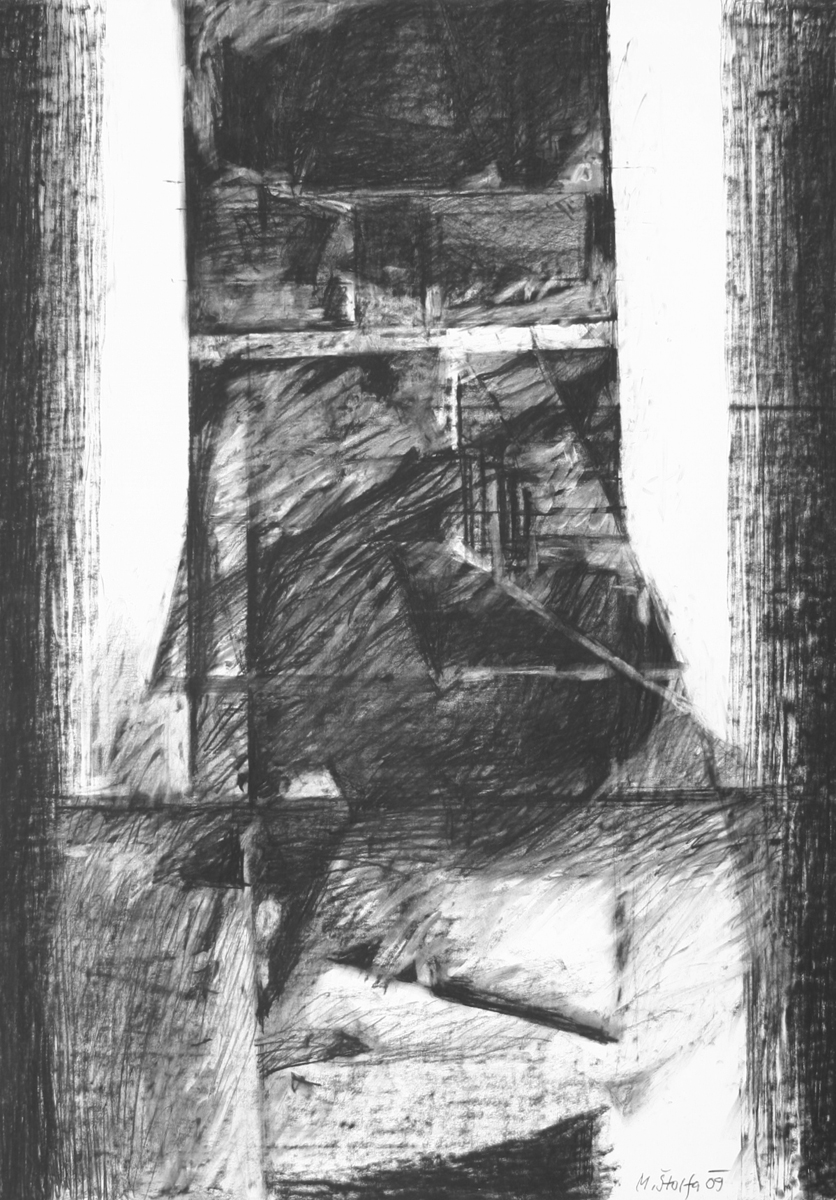
Window, 2009, charcoal, 100 x 70 cm

=== Public collections ===
- National Gallery in Prague
- Moravian Gallery in Brno
- Museum Bochum
- Albertina Wien
- Landesmuseum Niederösterreich, Wien
- Galerie Artica, Cuxhaven
- Print Consortium, San José
- Aleš South Bohemian Gallery, Hluboká nad Vltavou
- Muzeum of Fine Arts Olomouc
- Regional Gallery of Fine Arts, Zlín
- Regional Gallery of Fine Arts, Jihlava
- Regional Gallery of Fine Arts, Nové Město na Moravě
- Regional Gallery of Fine Arts, Hodonín
- Regional Gallery of Fine Arts, Havlíčkův Brod
- West Bohemian Gallery, Plzeň (Pilsen)
- Ministry of Culture of the Czech Republic

=== Selected collective exhibitions abroad ===
- 1988 21 zeitgenössische Maler aus Südmähren, Staatlichen Lindenau-Museum, Altenburg
- 1989 Suvreme Čehoslovačko slikarstvo, Galerija Karas, Zagreb
- 1992-2002 Minisalon, Galerie Nová síň, Praha, Art and Culture Centre, Hollywood, Los Angeles, Contemporary Arts Center, Cincinnati, Courtyard Gallery, New York City, Chicago Cultural Center, Indianapolis Museum of Art, The Museum of Fine Arts, St. Petersburg (Florida), Gallery of Fine Arts, Fort Myers (Florida), McKissick Museum, Columbia (South Carolina), National Czech & Slovak Museum & Library, Cedar Rapids (Iowa), University Art Gallery, North Dartmouth (Massachusetts), Jonson Gallery, Albuquerque (New Mexico), Telfair Museum of Art, Savannah (Georgia), Bibliothèque royale de Belgique, Brussels, Prague Castle, Galeri Nasional Indonesia, Jakarta, Museum Puri Lukisan, Ubud, Majapahit Mandarin Hotel, Surabaya, Centre tchèque Paris
- 2000 Schenkungen, Museum Bochum
- 2002 La Bohême en voiture, Musée national de l'automobile, Mulhouse
- 2016 Blickpunkt Abstrakt, Barockschloss, Riegersburg

== Notes ==
- translation from Czech Wikipedia
