= Miroslav Giuchici (footballer, born 1954) =

Romanian footballer

Personal information
- Date of birth: 18 April 1954 (age 72)
- Place of birth: Schei, Romania
- Position: Attacking midfielder

Youth career
- 1965–1967: Partizan Diniaș
- 1967–1972: Politehnica Timișoara

Senior career*
Years	Team	Apps	(Gls)
1972–1973	Electromotor Timișoara		
1973–1974	CFR Timișoara		
1974–1980	Politehnica Timișoara	33	(4)
1976–1977	→ UM Timișoara (loan)		
1979–1980	→ UM Timișoara (loan)		
1980–1982	Jiul Petroșani	60	(22)
1982–1986	Politehnica Timișoara (Note: The statistics for the 1983–84 and 1986–87 Divizia B seasons are unavailable.)	74	(23)
1987	Oblici Sânmartinu Sârbesc		
1987–1989	Progresul Timișoara		
Total		167	(49)
- * Club domestic league appearances and goals

Miroslav Giuchici (born 18 April 1954) is a Romanian former footballer who played as a midfielder. His son who was also named Miroslav Giuchici was also a footballer. After he ended his playing career, Giuchici started his own football academy, which was called Srbianka Giuchici Timișoara. He wrote a book which was released in 2018 called Viață și fotbal (Life and football).

== Honours ==
Politehnica Timișoara

- Divizia B: 1983–84, 1986–87
- Cupa României runner-up: 1982–83
