= Miroslav Kurelac =

Croatian historian

- Born: May 25, 1926
- Died: October 7, 2004 (aged 78)
- Occupation: Historian

Miroslav Kurelac (25 May 1926 – 7 October 2004) was a Yugoslav and Croatian historian.

He was born in Zagreb. He received a degree in history in 1954 at the Faculty of Philosophy in Zagreb, and a Ph.D. at the University of Zadar in 1987. Until 1956 he worked as an archivist in the Archives of the City of Zagreb. In 1954 he took a specialist training at the Archives Nationales de France where he attended courses in paleography at the École des Hautes Études at the Sorbonne. In 1956 he became an assistant at the Historical Institute of the Academy in Zagreb, where he worked since 1988 as a research associate, and since 1990 as a scientific advisor. From the 1979 he served as a manager, and in the period 1995-2002 as the Head of the Department of Historical Sciences at the Croatian Academy of Sciences and Arts. In 1994 he was elected as an associate member of the Academy.

In his scientific papers Kurelac studied the Croatian historiography of the period of Humanism and the Renaissance, especially the historiographical work of Ivan Lučić. His main work is Ivan Lučić-Lucius: otac hrvatske historiografije ("Ivan Lučić-Lucius: The Father of Croatian Historiography"), 1994.

He died in Zagreb.
