= Miroslav Ceplák =

Czech footballer

Personal information
- Date of birth: 16 June 1983 (age 43)
- Place of birth: Czechoslovakia
- Height: 1.76 m (5 ft 9 in)
- Position: Midfielder

Team information
- Current team: FK Fotbal Třinec
- Number: 15

Senior career*
Years	Team	Apps	(Gls)
?–2005	FK Žiar nad Hronom	-	(-)
2005–	Fotbal Třinec	141	(13)
- * Club domestic league appearances and goals as of 30 June 2012

Miroslav Ceplák (born 16 June 1983) is a Czech footballer who plays midfielder. He played for FK Žiar nad Hronom before moving to his current club FK Fotbal Třinec.
