= Miroslav Giuchici (footballer, born 1980) =

Romanian footballer

Personal information
- Full name: Miroslav Matea Giuchici
- Date of birth: 27 February 1980 (age 46)
- Place of birth: Timișoara, Romania
- Height: 1.82 m (6 ft 0 in)
- Position: Striker

Youth career
- Srbianka Giuchici Timișoara

Senior career*
Years	Team	Apps	(Gls)
1999–2000	Steaua București	1	(0)
2000–2001	UM Timișoara	40	(12)
2002	Petrolul Ploiești	2	(0)
2002–2003	Apulum Alba Iulia	21	(10)
2003–2005	Gloria Bistrița	18	(6)
2004	→ FC Brașov (loan)	9	(1)
2005	→ Apulum Alba Iulia (loan)	13	(3)
2005	Pandurii Târgu Jiu	0	(0)
2006	Jiul Petroșani	0	(0)
2009	CFR Timișoara		
Total		104	(33)
- * Club domestic league appearances and goals

Miroslav Matea Giuchici (born 27 February 1980) is a Romanian former footballer who played as a striker. His father who was also named Miroslav Giuchici was also a footballer.

== Honours ==
UM Timișoara

- Divizia B: 2000–01

Apulum Alba Iulia

- Divizia B: 2002–03
