= Miroslav Šuput =

Slovene painter and illustrator (born 1948)

- Born: 4/1/1948
- Known for: painting and illustrating
- Notable work: Children's books illustrations
- Awards: Levstik Award; 1989 for Begavka po valovih

Miroslav Šuput (born 1948) is a Slovene painter and illustrator.

He won the Levstik Award in 1989 for his illustrations in Alexander Grin's story Begavka po valovih (She Who Runs on the Waves).

== Selected Illustrated Works ==
- V osemdesetih dneh okoli sveta (Around the World in Eighty Days), written by Jules Verne, 2005
- Argonavti (Argonauts), written by Dane Zajc, 1999
- Brbi gre po barve (Brbi Find Some Colours), written by Samo Kuščer, 1994
- Žalostni princ (The Sad Prince), written by Barbara Andrews, 1993
- Begavka po valovih (She Who Runs on the Waves), written by Alexander Grin, 1989
- Mlin na veter (The Windmill), written by Stevan Raičković, 1988
- Morska dežela na železniški postaji (The Land of Sea at the Railway Station), written by Mate Dolenc, 1986
- Sveti trije kralji (The three Wise Men), written by Michel Tournier, 1989
- Kanglica kaše (The Bucket of Porrige), written by Kristina Brenk, 1986
