= František Mertl =

Franta (František Mertl)
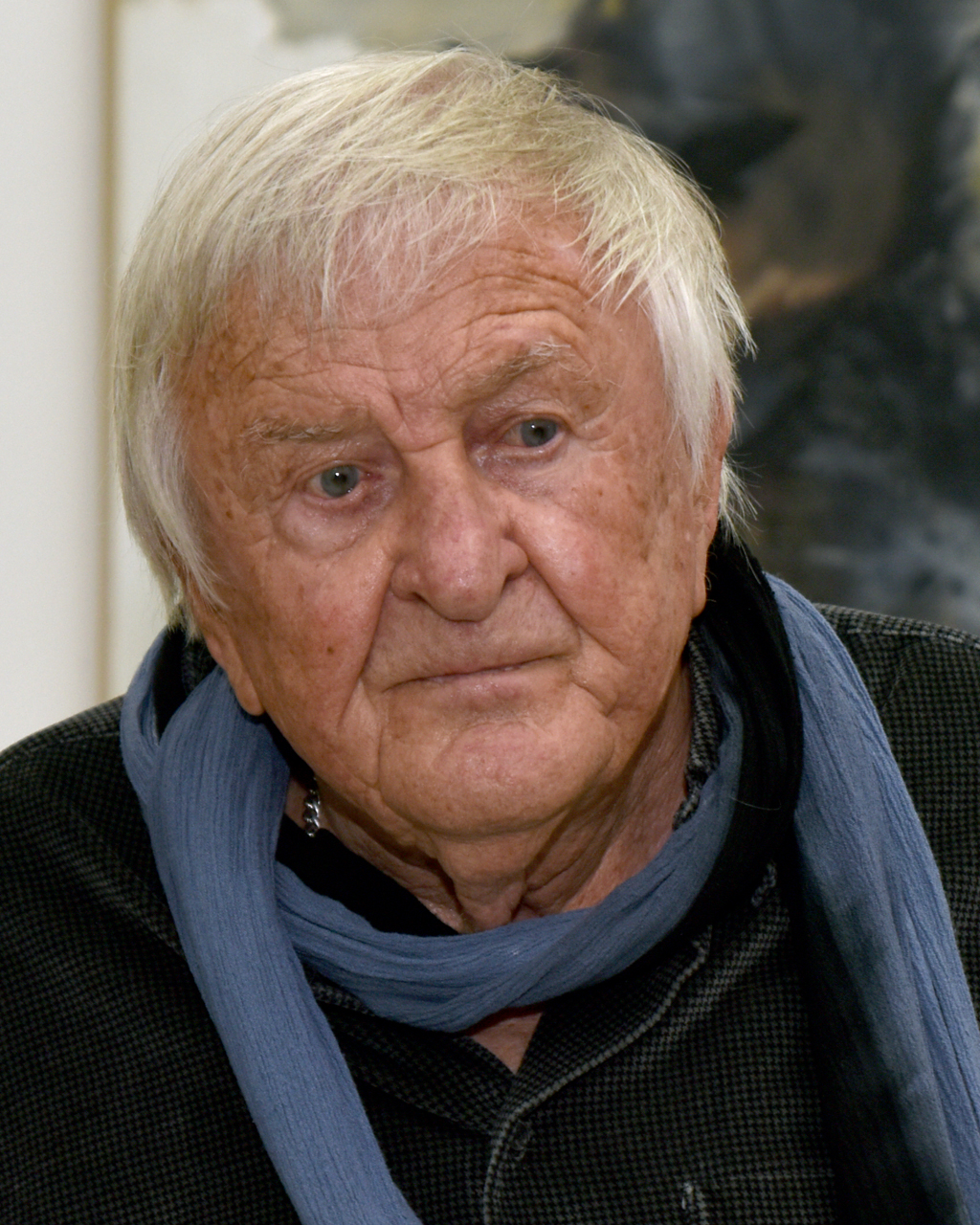
- Mertl in 2019
- Born: 16 March 1930 (age 96); Třebíč, Czechoslovakia
- Education: Academy of Fine Arts, Prague, Accademia Belle Arti Perugia
- Known for: painter, sculptor, teacher at the École supérieure d'Art de Grenoble
- Awards: Artis Bohemiae Amicis award (2017)

František Mertl (born 16 March 1930), who has used the artistic name Francois Mertl dit Franta in France since the 1960s, is a Czech painter and sculptor who emigrated to France in 1958 to join his wife. He lives in Vence, in the Nice area.

== Biography ==
=== Youth in Czechoslovakia ===
František Mertl came from Třebíč, but during the war he lived with his mother and brother in Brtnice in the Vysočina Region. His father, Miloš Mertl, traded in Czech crystal. He was deeply educated and spoke several languages. At the age of seventeen he enlisted in the First World War and later fought in the Czechoslovak legions. At the outbreak of the Second World War he was stationed in Turkey and from Istanbul went straight to southern France where a Czech unit was being formed. He fought on the northern front and after the French surrender he was transported to England. He fought as a tanker at Dunkirk and then went all over Europe. During the war, his mother was often interrogated by the Gestapo and threatened with deportation to Terezín. After František father's return, the family moved to Olomouc.

František Mertl attended school in Brtnice during the war, where his talent as a draughtsman was noticed by his drawing teacher Alois Toufar and influenced his future direction. However, at his father's request, František and his brother began their studies at the Slavic Gymnasium in Olomouc, and only after two years were they able to go to secondary art school in Brno. Even before passing the entrance exams to the Higher School of Art Industry in Brno, he took evening drawing classes based on a model at the Faculty of Education. After graduation, František Mertl decided between studying architecture or painting. In 1952 he was admitted to the Academy of Fine Arts in Prague to the studio of Prof. Miloslav Holý. During his studies, Mertl's friends included Jan Koblasa, Bedřich Dlouhý, Karel Nepraš, Theodor Pištěk, Milan Ressel and Rudolf Komorous - the circle of the future Šmidra group. Together with them, he participated in the Malmuzherciada recessionist exhibition in December 1954.

In 1956 the school received an offer through the Ministry of Education to study at the Accademia Belle Arti in Perugia. Thanks to the financial guarantee of a former business partner of Mertl's father, who lived in Italy, František Mertl was the only student who managed to obtain visa. He traveled privately without the Ministry of the Interior noticing in time. In Italy, he had the opportunity to study the works of Italian masters and contemporary art, as well as to experience Italian neorealism in film. There he met Jacqueline Sussan, a French student of Italian language and art history. He returned to Prague only out of a sense of responsibility towards his mother and Prof. Holý, who had vouched for him and would have been threatened with punishment by the StB. Upon his return, he discovered that the StB had also been following him in Italy and years later learned that they had planted an agent who posed as an Italian but was from Russia. This was followed by a ban on any further travel abroad.

Jacqueline came from an ancient Jewish family living in Algiers since the 15th century. She visited František Mertl twice in Prague, was arrested several times, and throughout her stay the couple was followed by the StB. On her second return, she was abducted, stripped and interrogated by the StB at Ruzyně airport, and only when she began to cry for help was she rescued by Air France pilots. The StB was bothered by her Jewish origin and considered her a spy. Before her flight, she was told that she would not receive another visa to Czechoslovakia.

=== Life in France ===
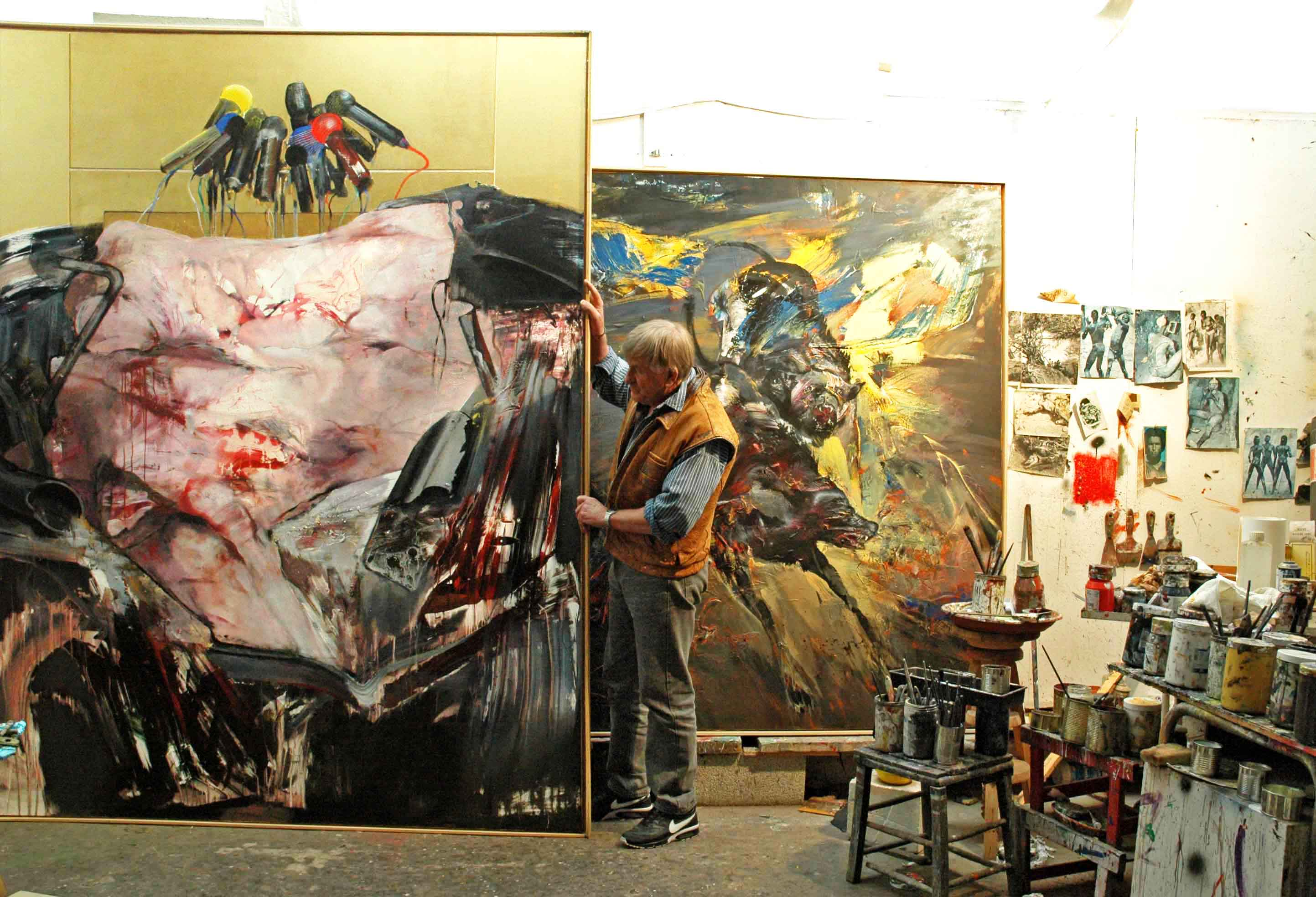
Roland Michaud photographe, Franta, atelier in Vence (2006)

František Mertl was forbidden to travel after his return from Italy, but in 1958 he managed to join a trip of Academy students to the East Germany. During a stopover in Berlin, he mingled with a group of workers at the Brandenburg Gate and crossed with them to the British sector in West Berlin. He spent two months in refugee camps, but eventually escaped, crossed the border into France on foot and travelled by train to Nice, where Jacqueline lived. When he checked in at the office, he chanced upon a Frenchman who had fought with his father at Dunkirk. Together with a guarantee from Jacqueline's parents, this helped to obtain new documents. In Czechoslovakia, the state authorities took revenge on the family - the father lost his job and the StB tried to force him to cooperate by indiscriminate pressure; his brother's studies at university were interrupted. František Mertl married in France in 1959 and with his wife Jacqueline has a son Pierre (* 1960) and a daughter Catherine (* 1961). Jacqueline's family shared a similarly dramatic fate to that of František Mertl - her parents and brother were expelled from their home in 1962, along with other Frenchmen, after the end of the Algerian War of Independence. So the whole family built a new house in Vence, which included a painting studio.

František Mertl was granted French citizenship, while his Czech citizenship was revoked. When his father died and his mother fell ill, he looked for ways to visit her. The Czechoslovak authorities did not recognize his French citizenship until 17 years after his emigration and after he had paid a large sum for his studies, and granted him a visa in 1974. Throughout his stay, his family was followed and harassed by the StB, who subsequently interrogated the friends he met.

František Mertl first exhibited independently in Paris in 1960 and the following year in Nice, London and Versailles. Since his first exhibitions in France, he has signed his paintings only with his first name Franta. He represented France at the Biennale de Paris (1963, 1965). In the 1960s, the director of the National Gallery, Jiří Kotalík, visited him and purchased a painting, drawings and a sculpture for his collection. In the late 1960s, he was offered a solo exhibition at the Musée d'art moderne de la Ville de Paris by the director Pierre Gaudibert, but the director was dismissed in 1972 shortly before the planned exhibition and the show was cancelled. It took place two years later at the Musée Galliera.

In 1977, he was invited to participate in the exhibition "Mythologies Quotidiennes (Everyday Mythologies)" organized by Gérald Gassiot-Talabot and J.L. Pradel at the Musée National d'Art Moderne in Paris. In the 1980s, Franta taught painting at the École supérieure d'Art de Grenoble and for several years ran summer painting courses in Vence. The Fondation Maeght built studios in Saint-Paul-de-Vence and Franta met many artists there - Antoni Tàpies, Joan Miró, Eduardo Chillida, Paul Rebeyrolle, etc. His neighbours were Marc Chagall, Arman and Graham Greene, with whom he became friends. Graham Greene introduced him to the work of Francis Bacon. He had known Jiří Kolář since the time of his studies in Prague and kept in contact with him throughout the time Jiří Kolář lived in France. Jan Koblasa, a fellow student living in Germany, also visited him regularly in Vence.

In 1983 he had a retrospective exhibition at the Centre national d'art contemporain in Nice. In the 1980s, he and his wife frequently visited the countries of North Africa and the Sahara, and later made some sixteen trips to the Central African region, where he found new inspiration for his work. With an all-terrain vehicle and a tent, he travelled through Mali, Kenya, Niger, Burkina Faso, Senegal, Gambia and Chad. After visiting the slave island of Goree, he decided to travel to the USA to meet African Americans. Since his first visit to New York, he has returned there frequently and has mapped the black neighborhoods of the Bronx, Haarlem and Brooklyn in detail, from where he has taken many drawings. Since 1985, Franta has had six solo exhibitions in New York, most notably two parallel exhibitions in 1989 at the Bronx Museum of the Arts and the Terry Dintenfass Gallery on 57th Street in Manhattan. At that time he always rented a studio in New York and socialized with the art community there, which included Robert Rauschenberg, Louise Bourgeois, Roy Lichtenstein, Thomas Messer, director of the Guggenheim Museum, Charlotta Kotik, curator of Contemporary Art at The Brooklyn Museum, Richard Oldenburg, director of Museum of Modern Art, and critics Dore Ashton and Robert Pincus-Witten followed his work with interest.

František Mertl has been a competitive cyclist since his youth and aspired to be nominated for the Peace Race. However, at the age of 16 he suffered an injury while racing and only returned to cycling in France. Here he struck up a friendship with French champion Jean Fréchaut and together with him founded a cycling club in Vence. The two trained together and Franta's son raced for the club.

In 2014, Franta donated 40 of his paintings and drawings to his hometown of Třebíč, which set up a permanent exhibition of his work in the former National House - the Franta Gallery. Since 2016, the exhibition has included his most important sculpture, The Eighth Day (1993), which the town purchased.

=== Awards ===
- 2014 Honorary citizenship of Třebíč, opening of the permanent exhibition Franta - František Mertl
- 2016 graduation from the Université Nice Sophia Antipolis
- 2017 Artis Bohemiae Amicis award, presented by Minister of Culture

== Work ==
Franta is one of the leading representatives of the European post-war wave of New Figuration, which responded to a deep crisis of human values and feelings of alienation. It represents a radical break from realistic representation and interprets the artist's inner reflection in confrontation with the social and existential catastrophes of modern times. He became one of the few Czech artists who have stood out on the world art scene and his importance in France can be ranked alongside names such as Alphonse Mucha, František Kupka, Josef Šíma and Jiří Kolář.

=== Paintings and drawings ===
Prof. Holý's students at the academy devoted much time to drawing figures and portraits from a model, and were also given the task of modelling a portrait in clay. František Mertl also deepened his thorough knowledge of human anatomy through his friendship with medics who arranged for him to participate in autopsies. During his studies in Italy, he became directly acquainted with the works of the old masters and modern art, and was also influenced by the cinematic wave of Italian neorealism.

After arriving in France, he painted mostly physical and expressive human figures, and the subjects of his paintings often had a social charge (The Fishermen, 1960). All of his early works from around 1962 were acquired by a private gallery, which entered into a three-year contract with Franta. He was later able to buy some of them back at auction. A transition to a different painting style is represented by the strongly expressive painting Total Striptease (1965). Franta does not shy away from depicting extreme existential distress and drastically naturalistic renderings of mutilated or dead bodies (Shelter, 1966).

==== Early works ====
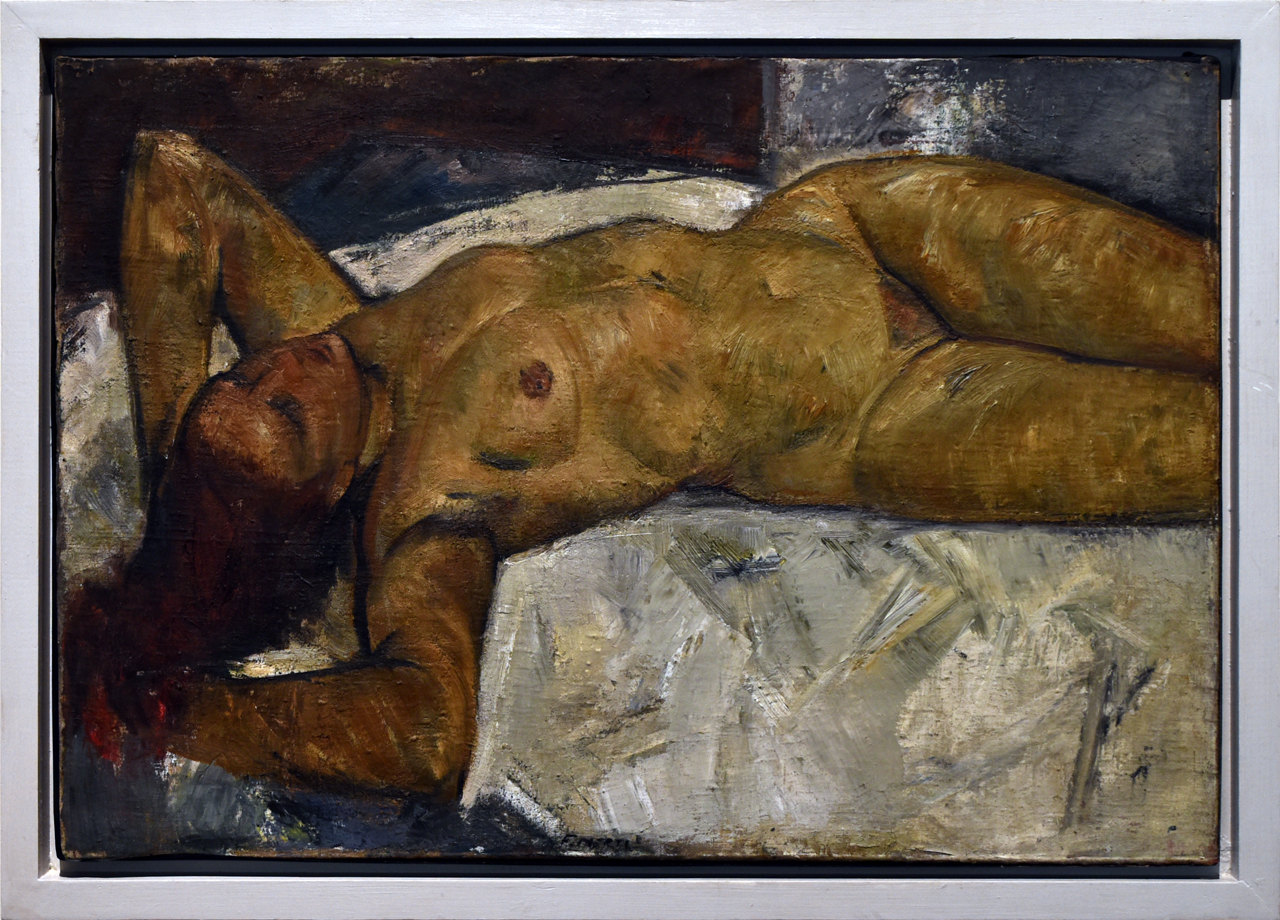
Study of the nude (1954)

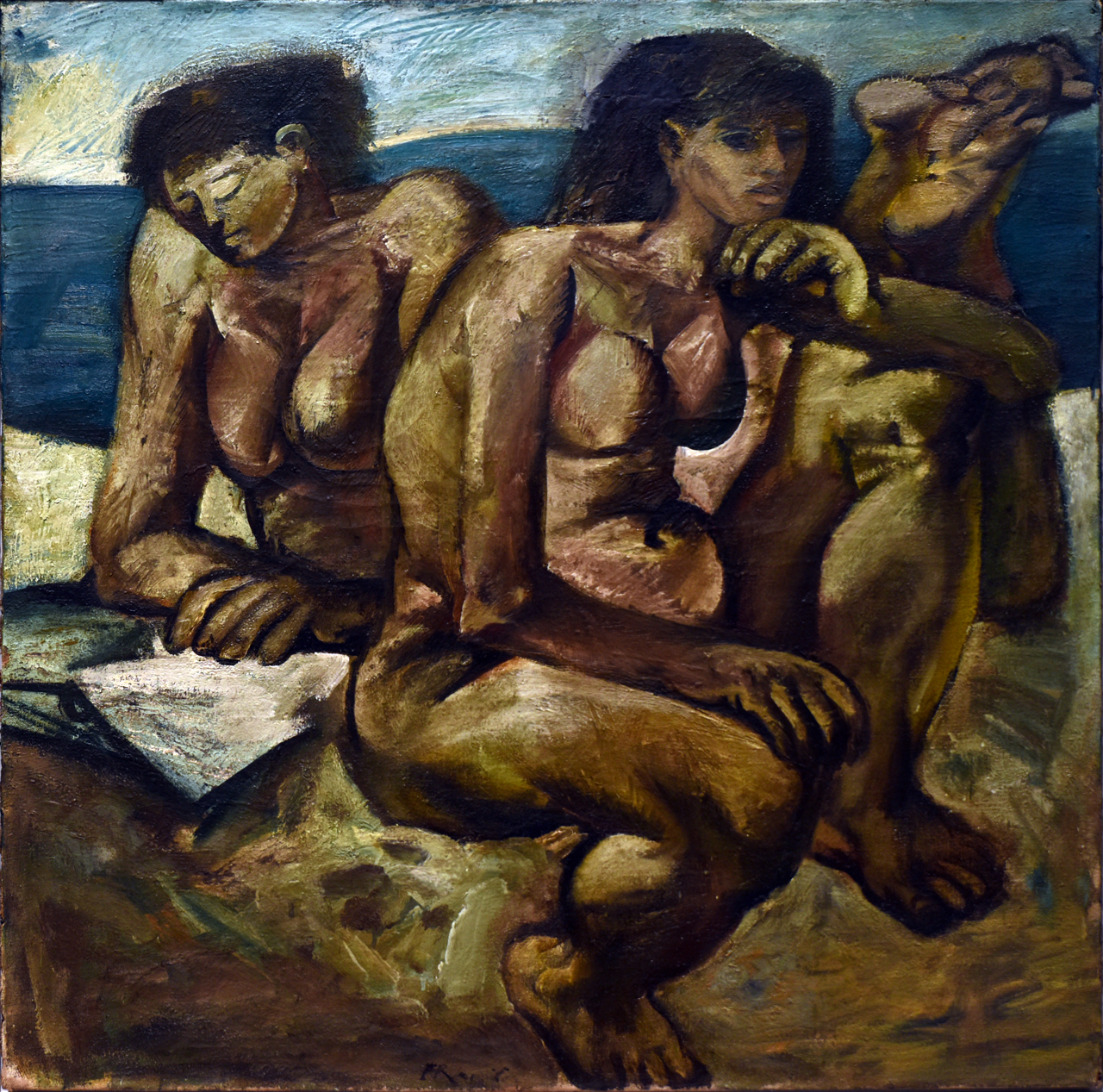
Beach (1960)

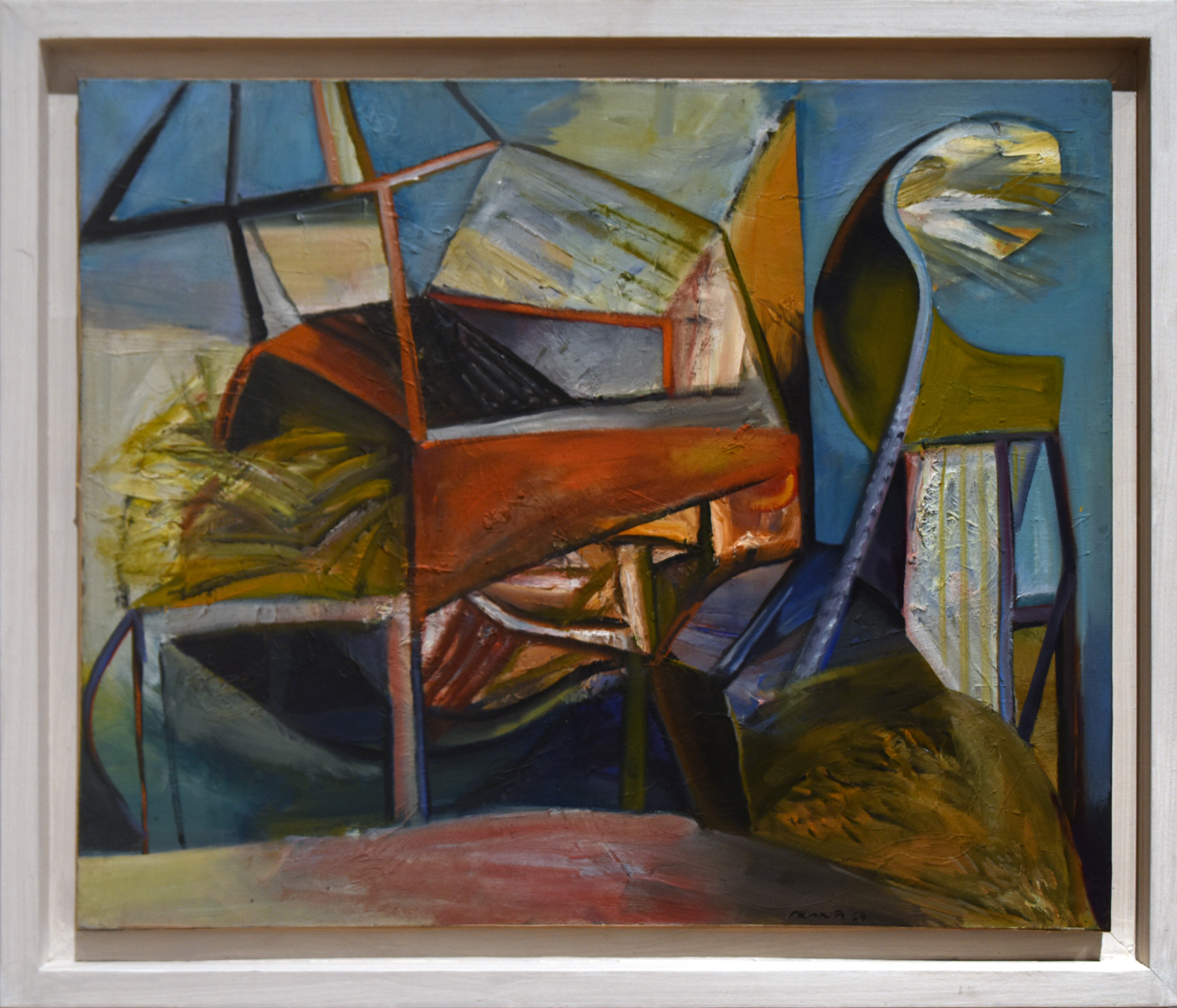
Threshing machine (1963)

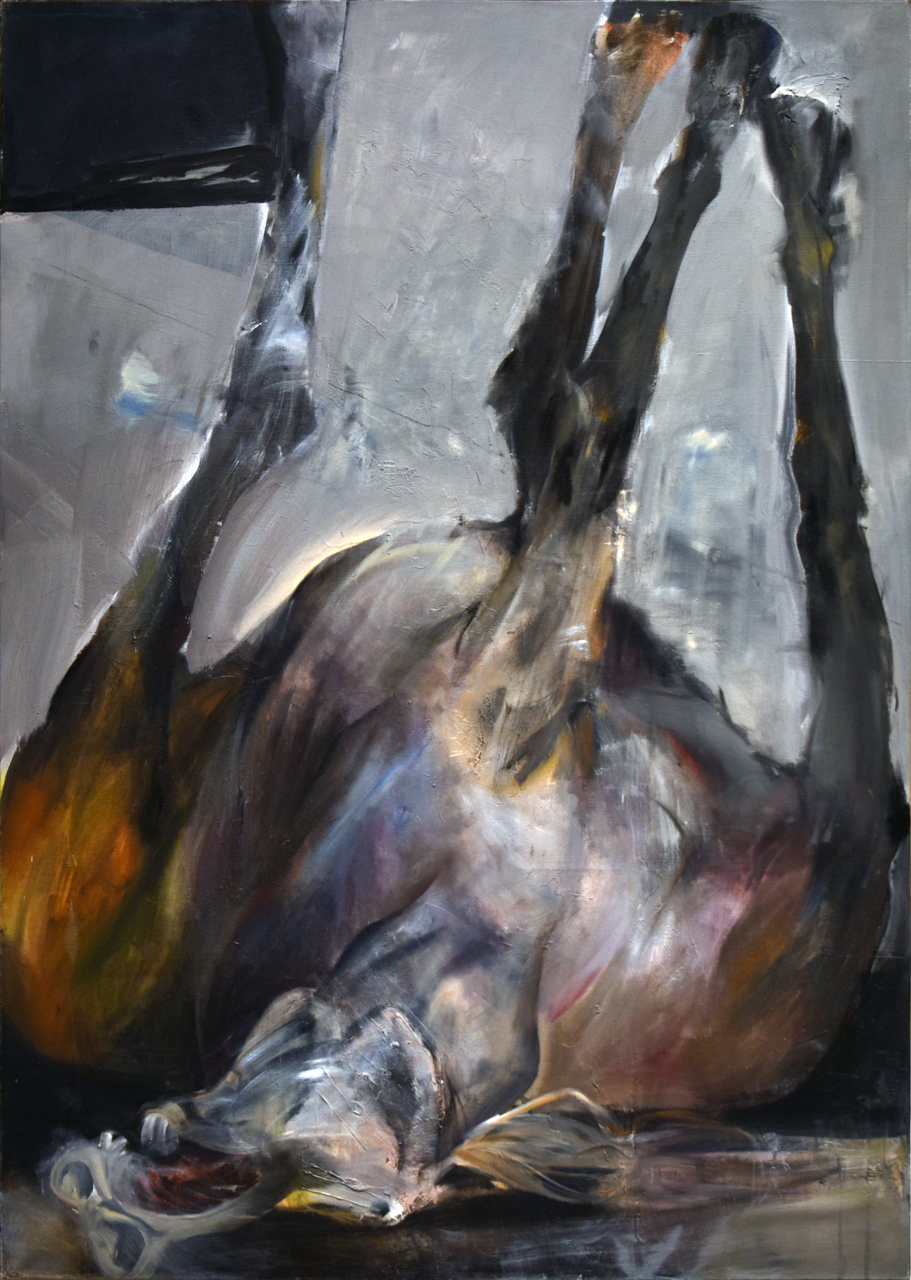
The End (1964)

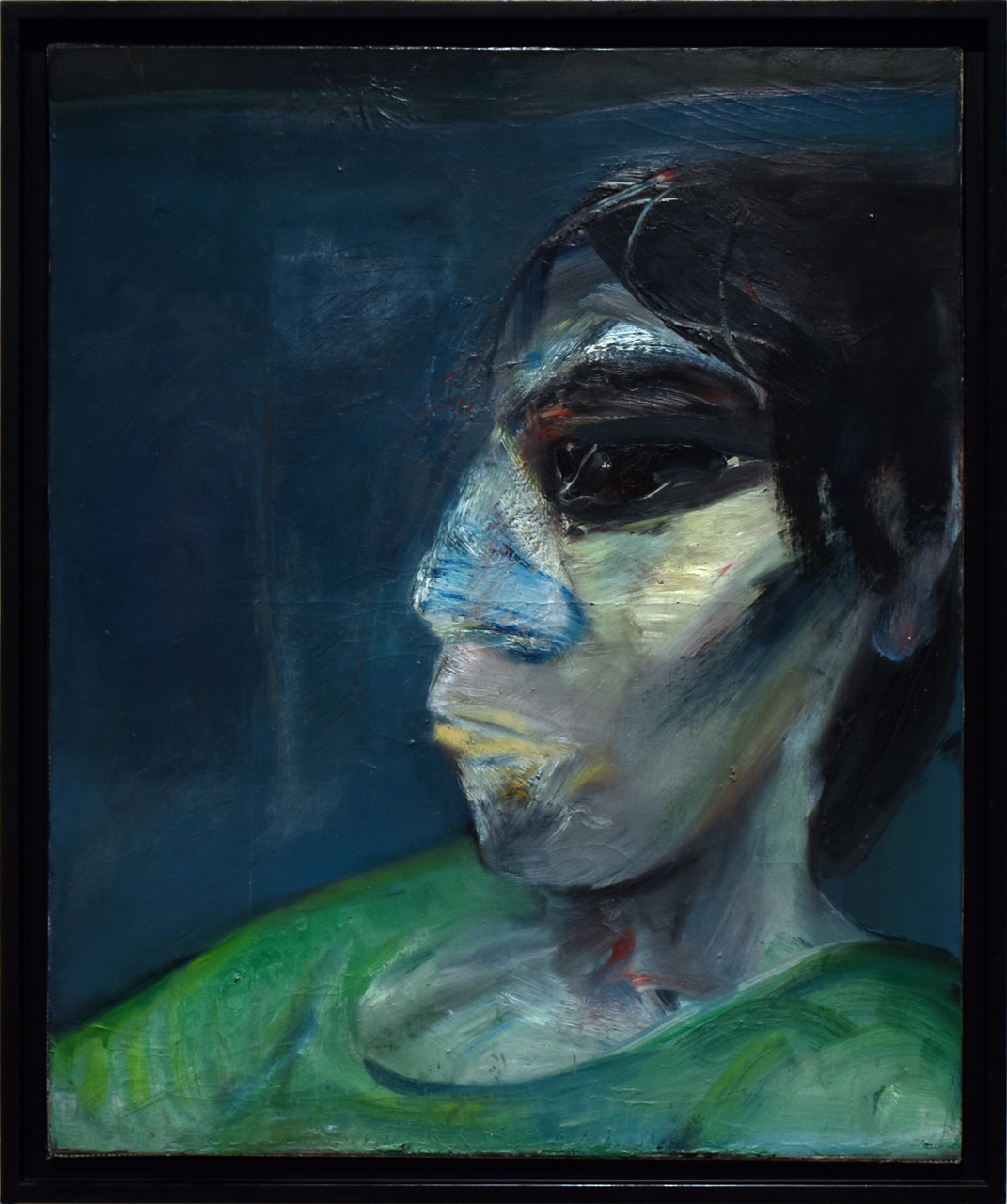
Jacqueline (1965)

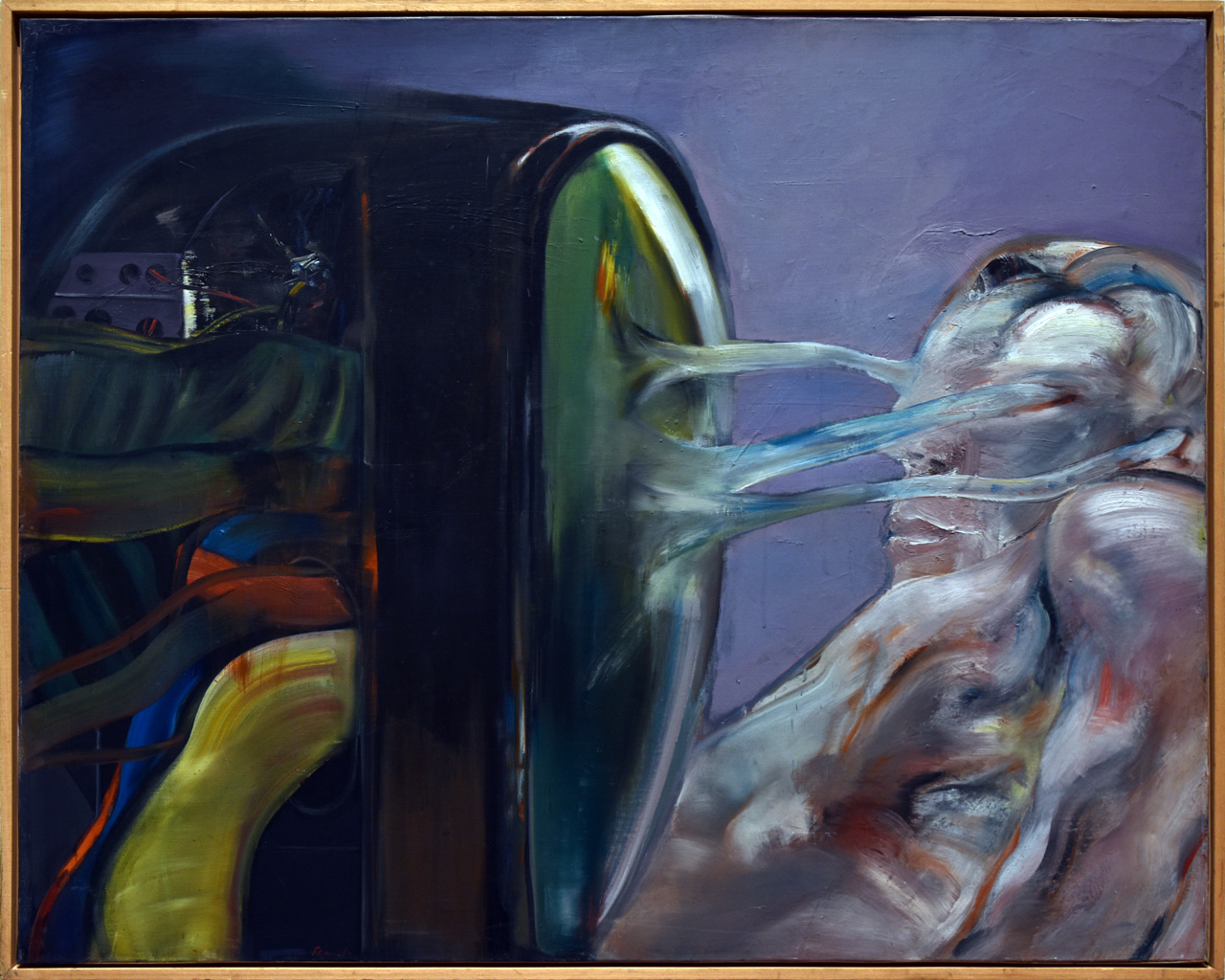
Live Broadcast (1966)

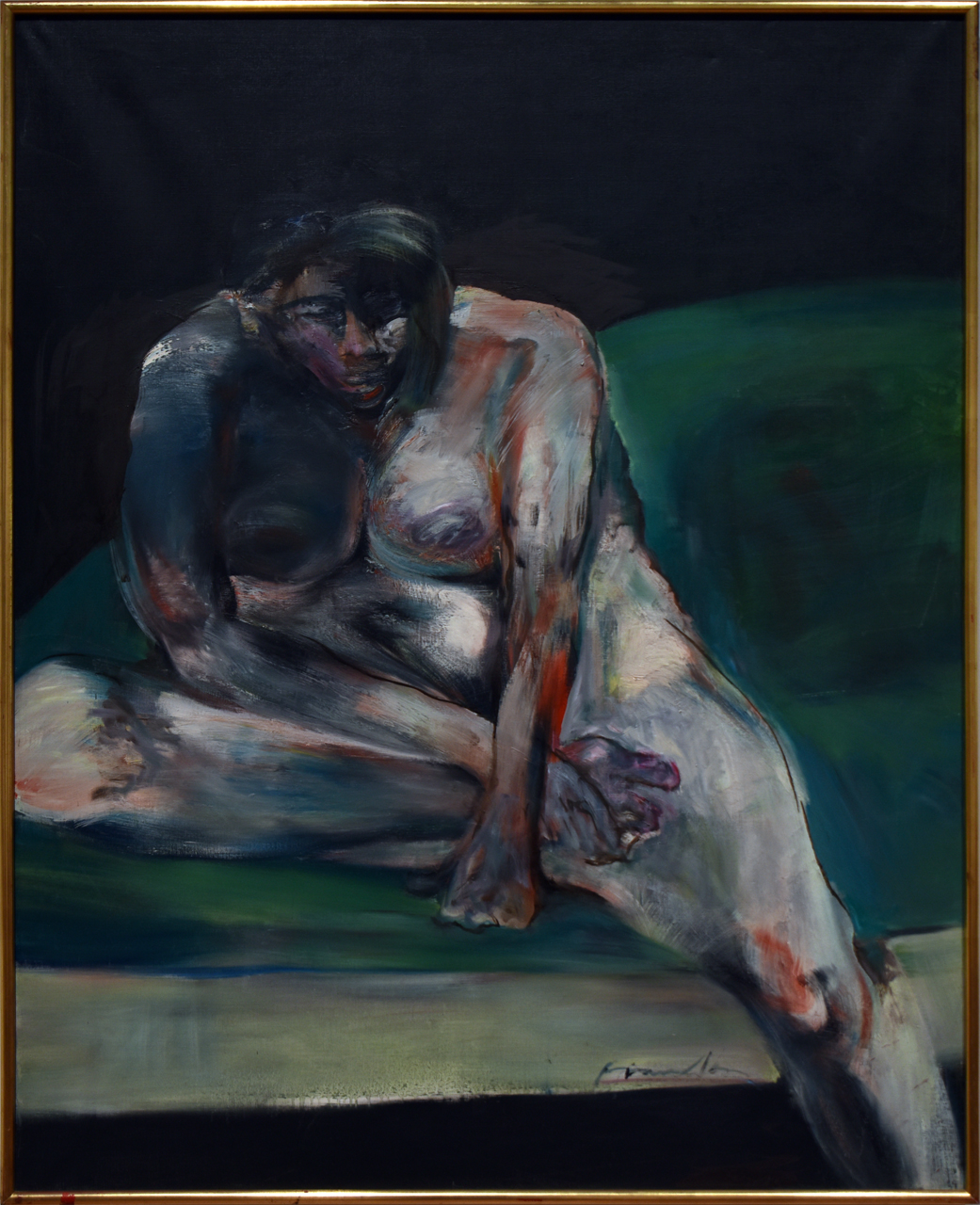
VLarge Nude (1966)

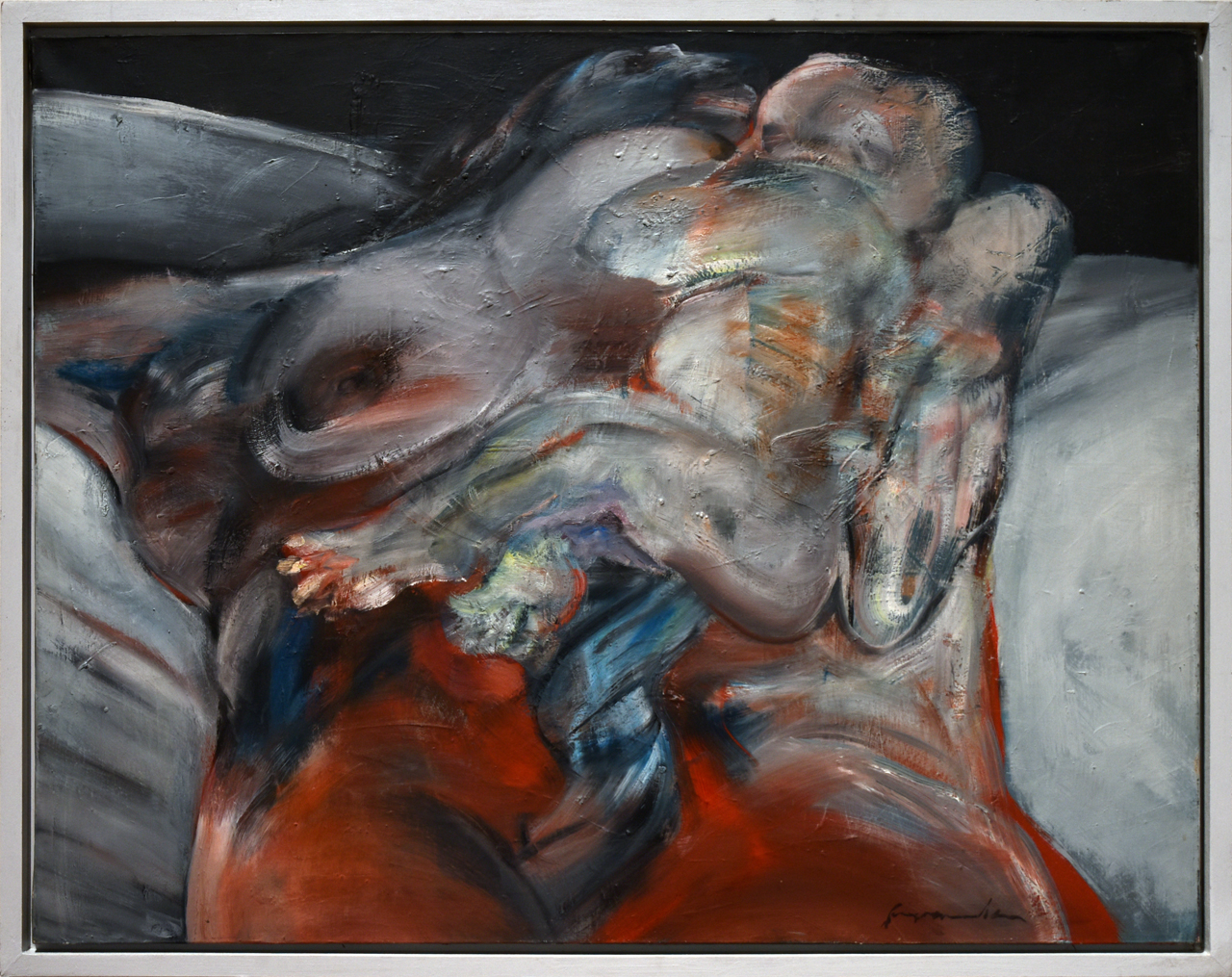
Birth (1967)

The painter was strongly influenced by his direct participation in the birth of both of his children, and he returned to the subject repeatedly. His painting became spontaneous to the point of gesture, as if he were trying to capture a fleeting intense sensation. The enclosed volume of the figure opens up into space through illusionistic painting, and the human body is transformed into a symbolic and dynamic metaphor (Motherhood, 1967, Father and Child, 1968, Birth, 1978). The human figure is also the subject of Franta's large-scale lavished Chinese ink drawings. The torsos of human bodies are set in an impersonal, presumably hospital setting, and are a masterful example of modelling volume with light and shadow (The Cage, 1977, Awakening, 1982).

The subjects of Franta's paintings have a deeply human appeal, even as they reflect a world full of evil and civilizational violence and indifference to human fate. The central motif is the human victim as a naked figure, often reduced to mere matter. As oppressive metaphysical symbols, fragments of bodies are moved on a kind of conveyor belt (Ascension, 1969) or wedged in the middle of a crashed car (Full Line, 1970). Drastic images, reminiscent of medieval paintings of death row convicts entangled in a wheel, show the soft mass of the human body trapped amidst real or only hinted at impersonal, cold and aggressive technical or military props (Brothers Enemy, 1973, Chain, 1976, Escalator, 1977). In 1974, the French critic Pierre Gaudibert wrote of Franta's paintings: "Franta pursues one of the two most important practices of mid-20th-century art: an organic anonymity that is the antithesis of the tradition of the portrait of human individuality. The defeat of man here cries out in endless suffering, without recourse, without redemption, without justification..."

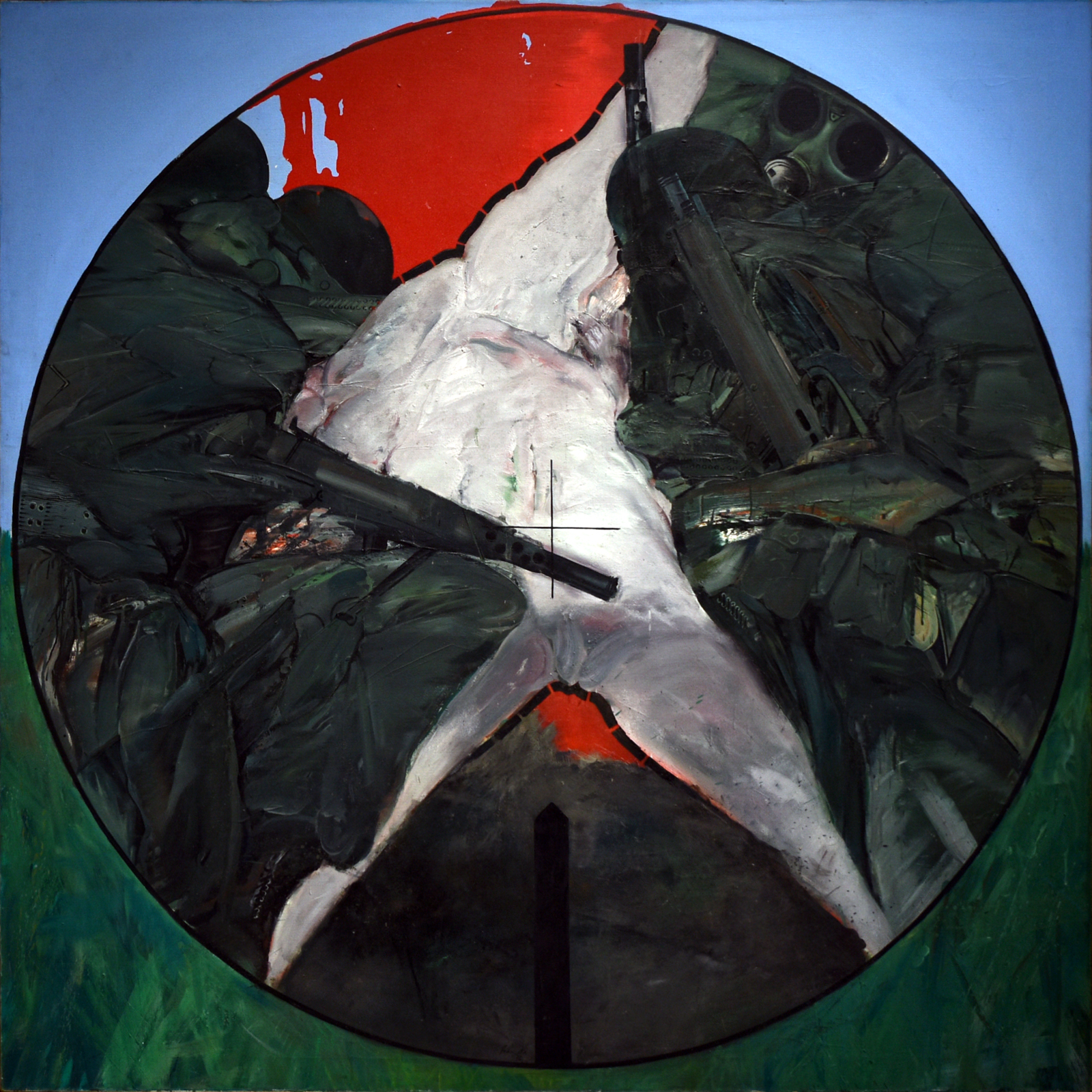
Target (1972)

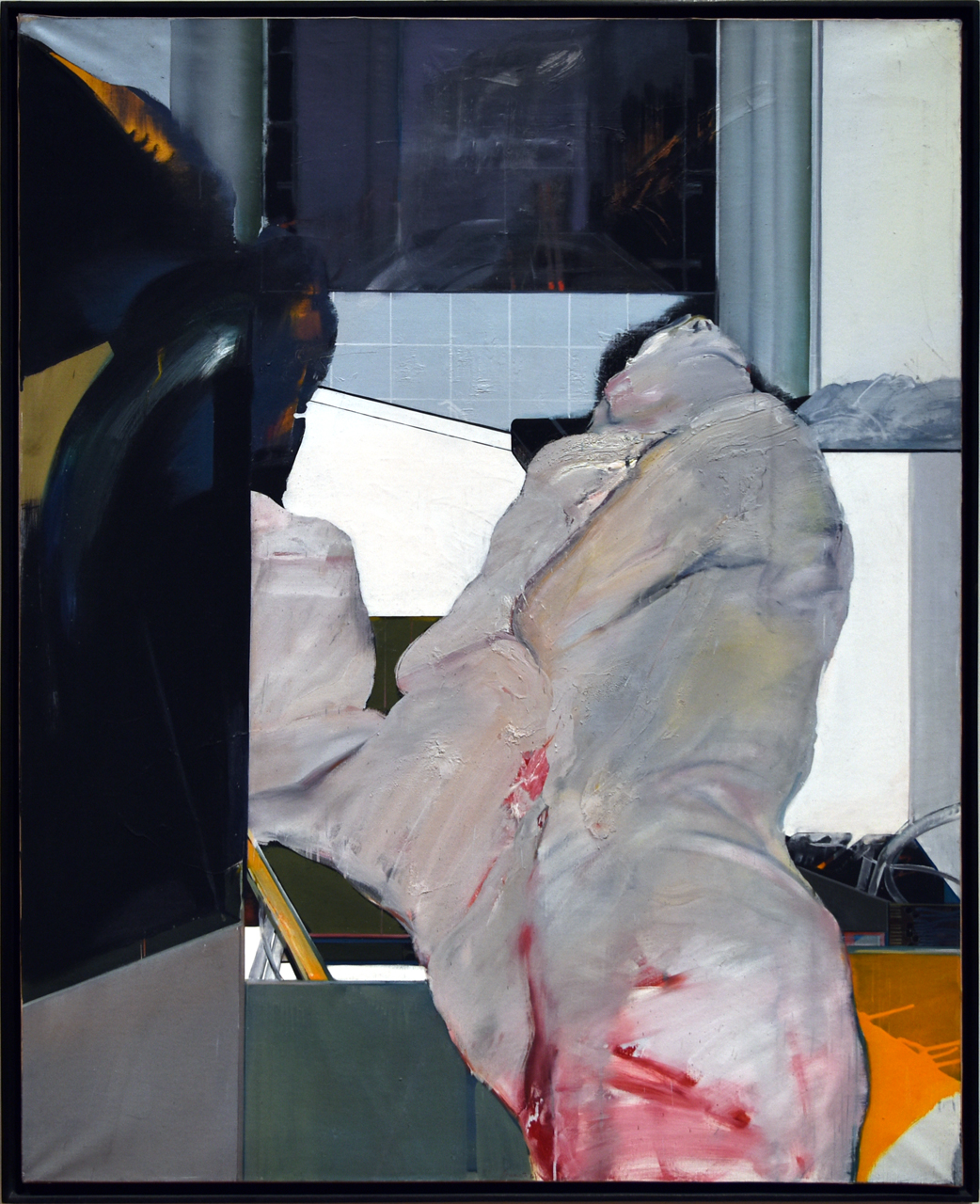
Transplantation (1972)

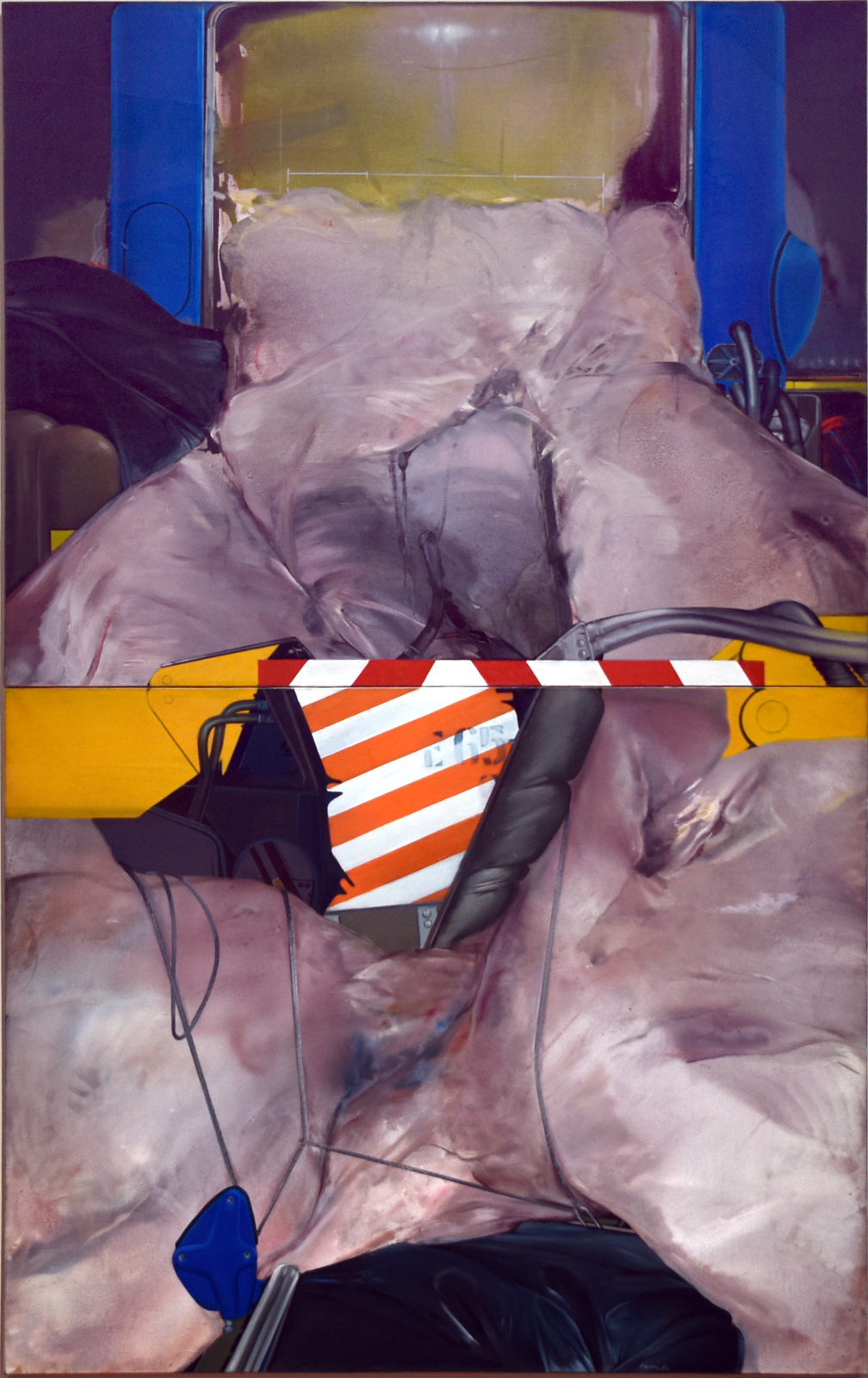
Lifting device (1973)

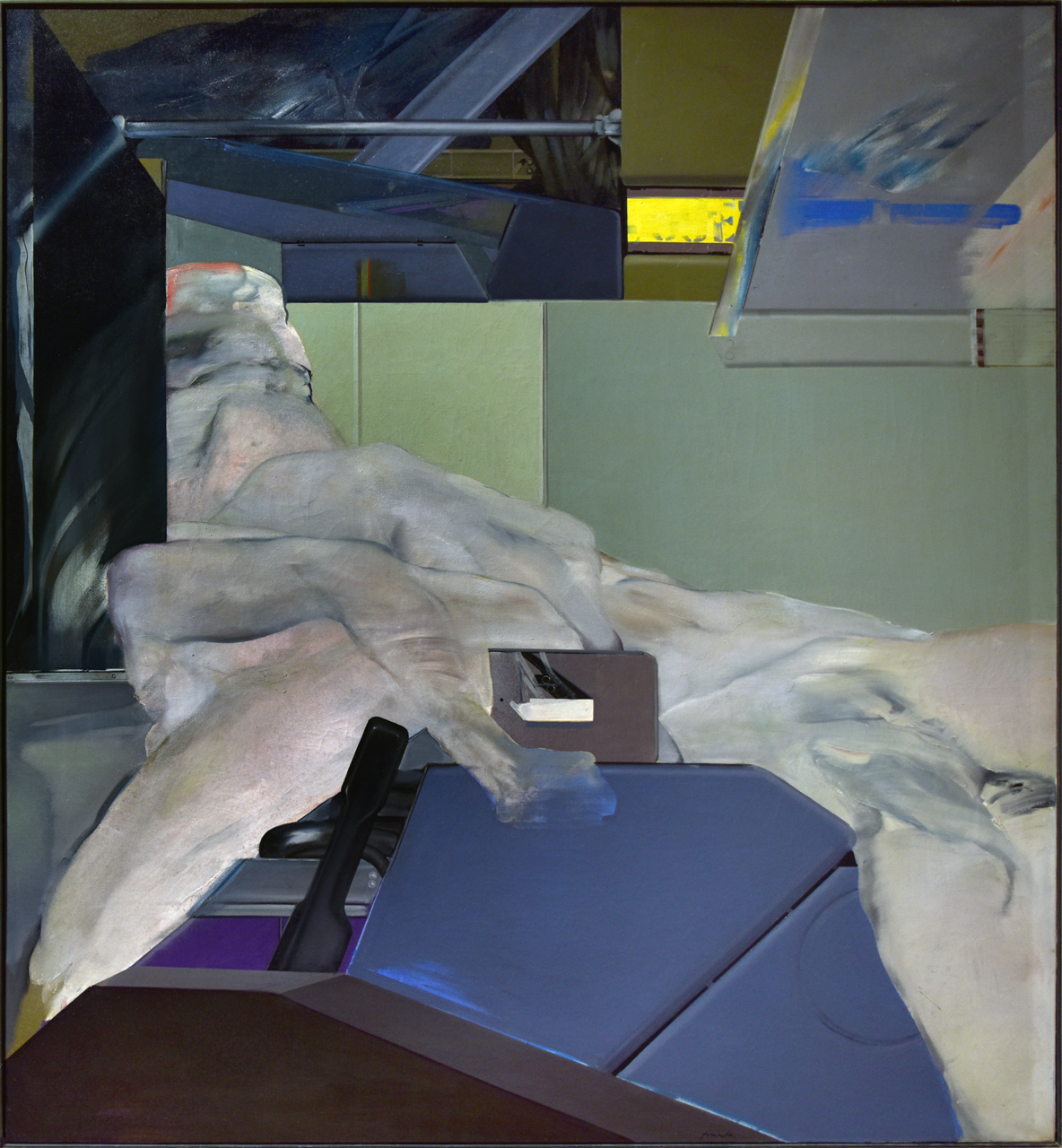
Escalator (1977)

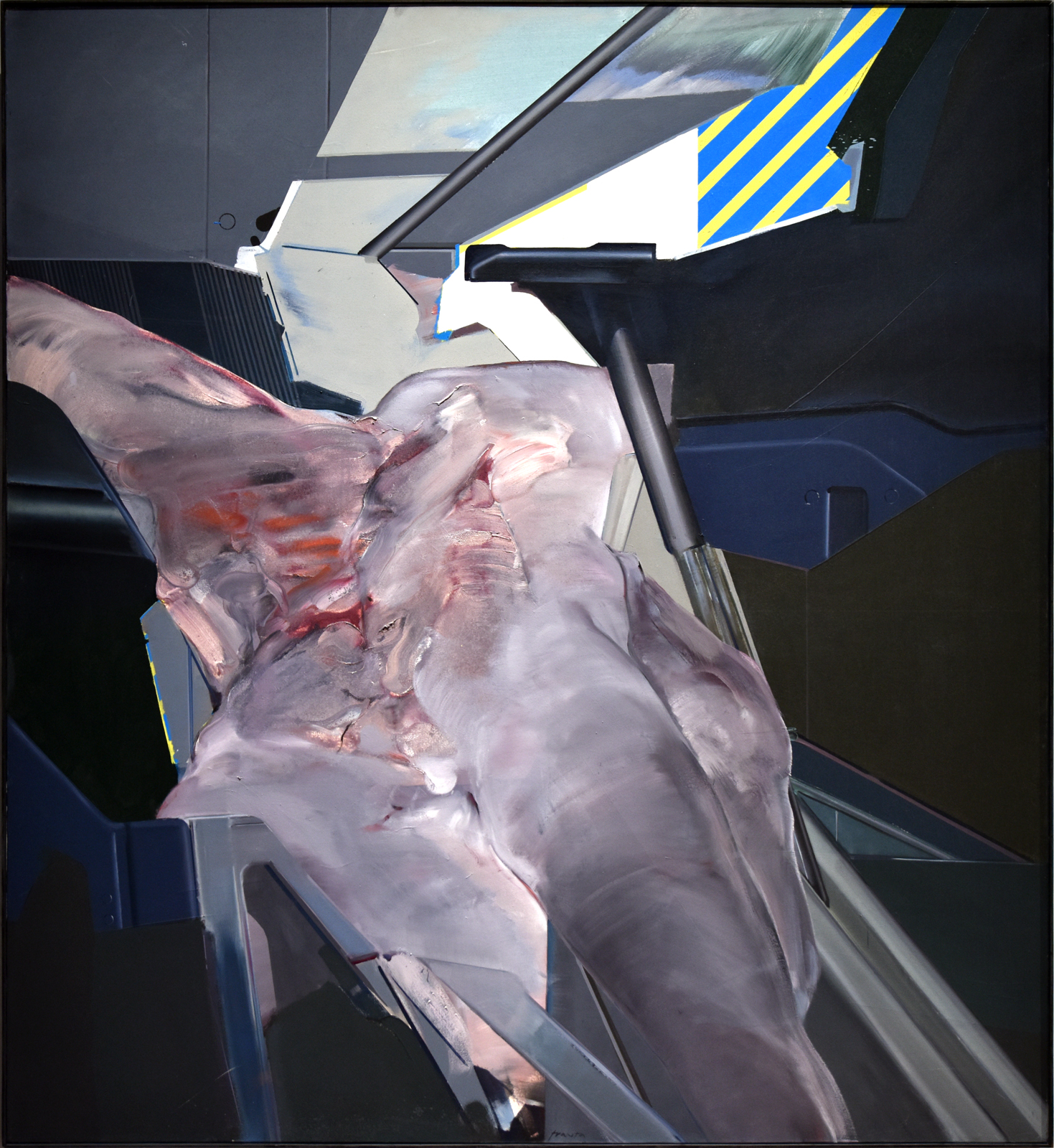
Fall (1977-1979)

As a metaphor of physical and moral evil, comprehensible to all those who are memorials or witnesses of the not too distant history of genocides, concentration camps, mass graves or the explosion of the atomic bomb, the triptych Testimony (8 x 2.5 m, 1993–1994), originally intended for the Lidice Memorial, was created during six months of intensive work. The painting was subsequently exhibited in Litoměřice at an exhibition marking the fiftieth anniversary of the liberation of the Terezín concentration camp and in several places in France. In Japan, where it is considered an allegory of Hiroshima, it was purchased for a collection in Nagoya, and installed in a newly built separate space next to the painting by Anselm Kiefer.

The breakthrough in Franta's painting was marked by direct experience of his sojourns in equatorial Africa. In a culturally distant environment outside his own civilization, he found an intense experience of the beauty of the body and being in its most immediate physical existence. He began to draw the human figure and its details anew. The style of painting is subordinated to a brisk, almost reportorial depiction of the figures, and the medium of expression is the sketched drawing and the free brushstroke. He increasingly replaced oil paint with acrylic, which allows for a faster process.

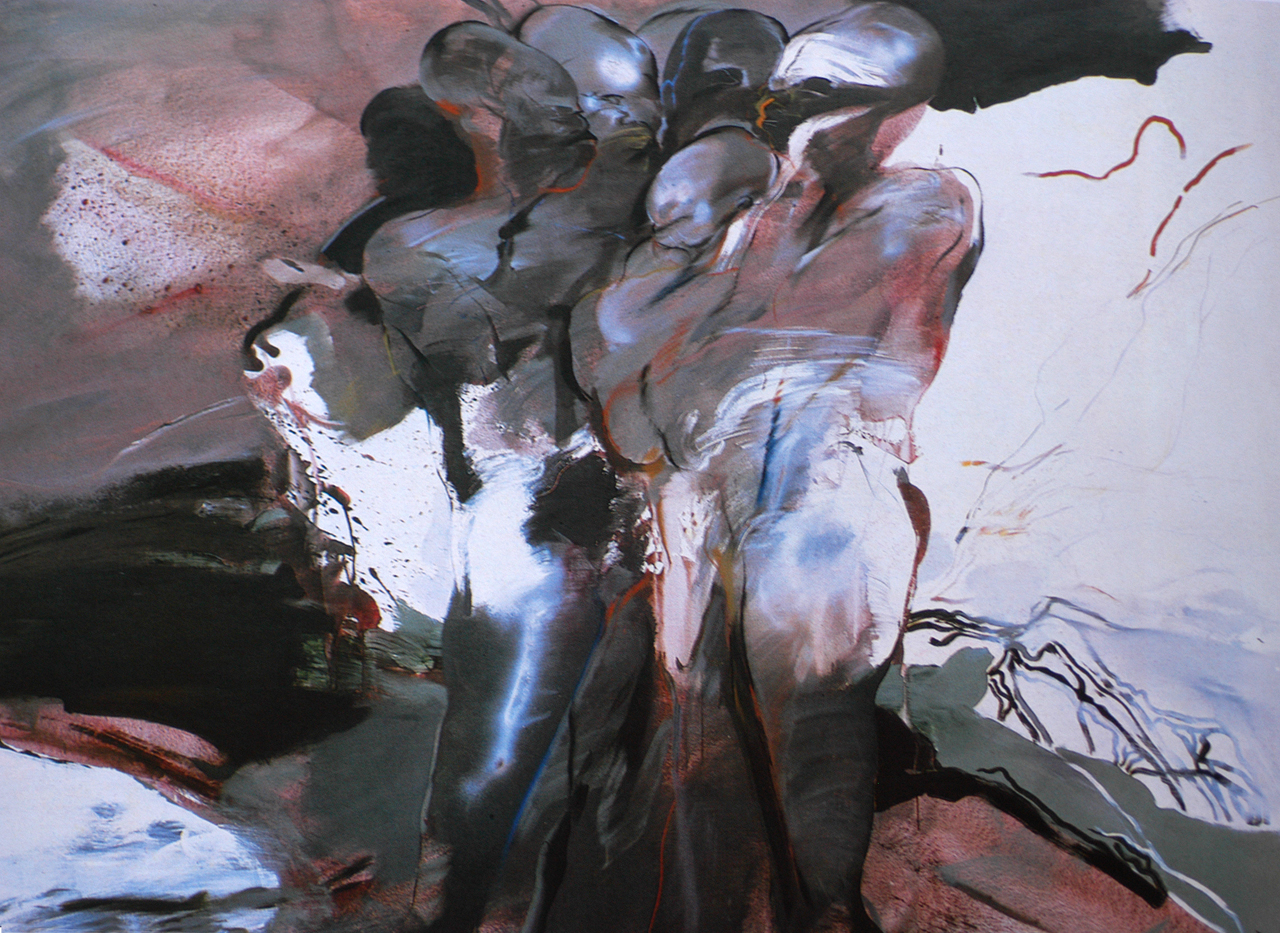
Meeting (1986)

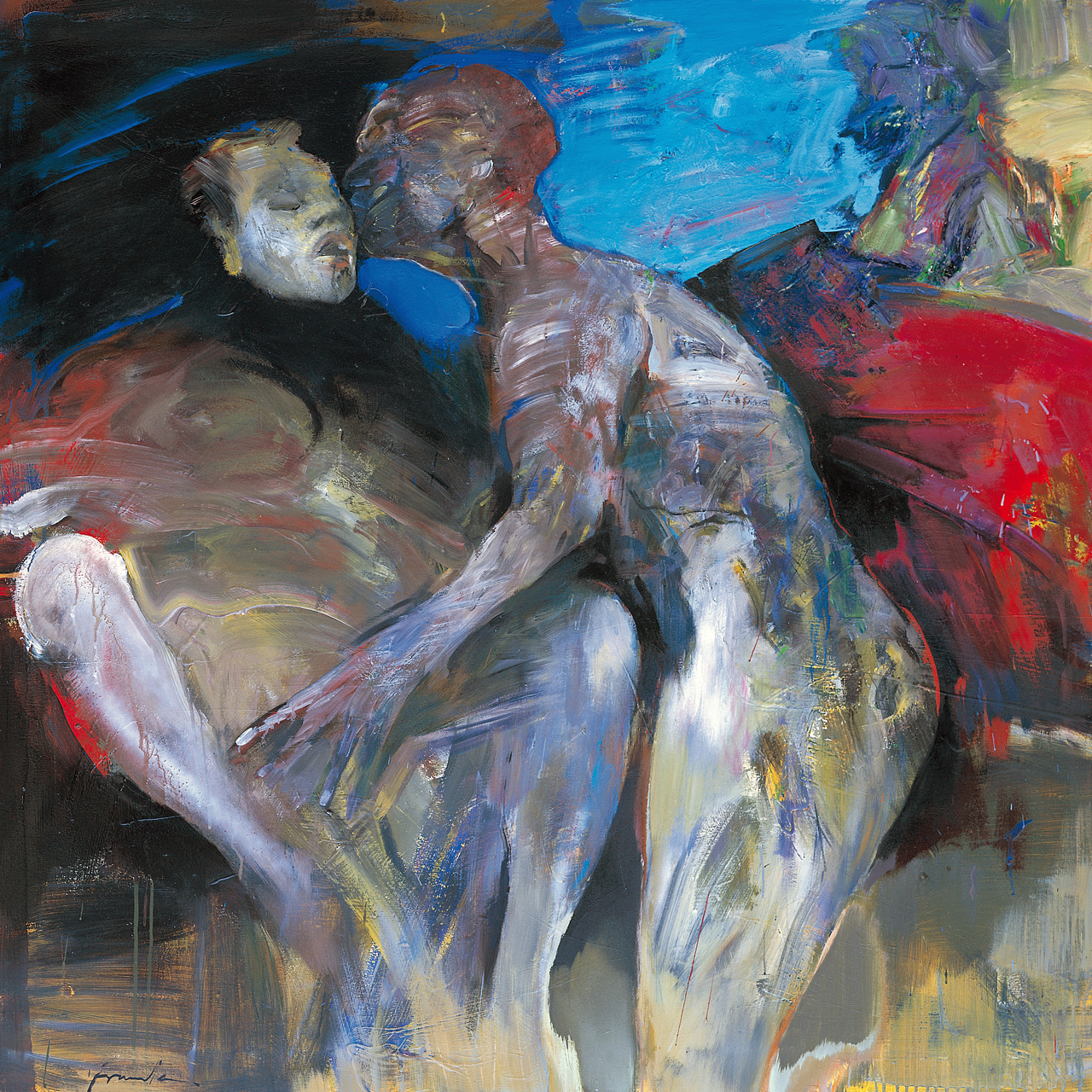
Couple (1998)

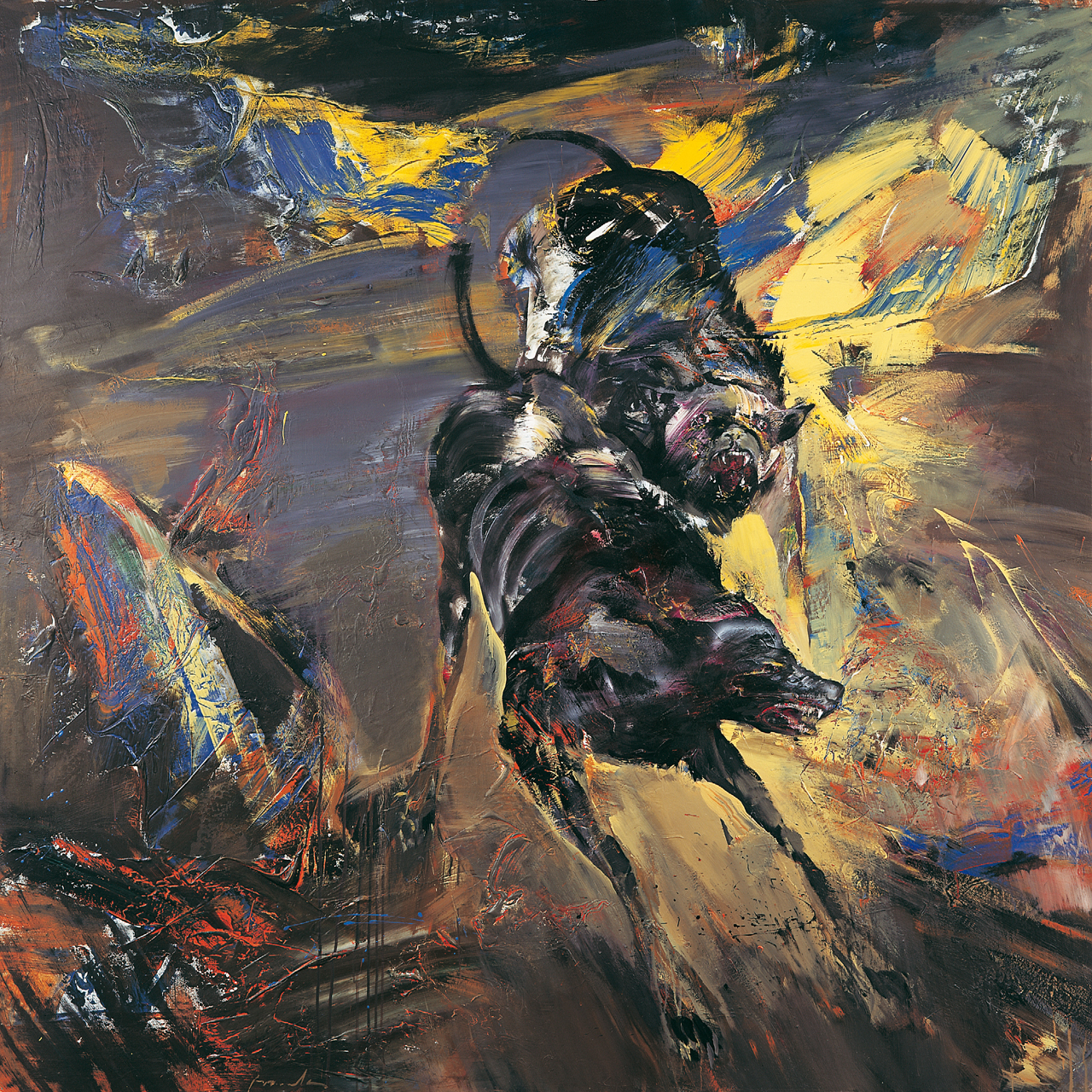
Fury (1995)

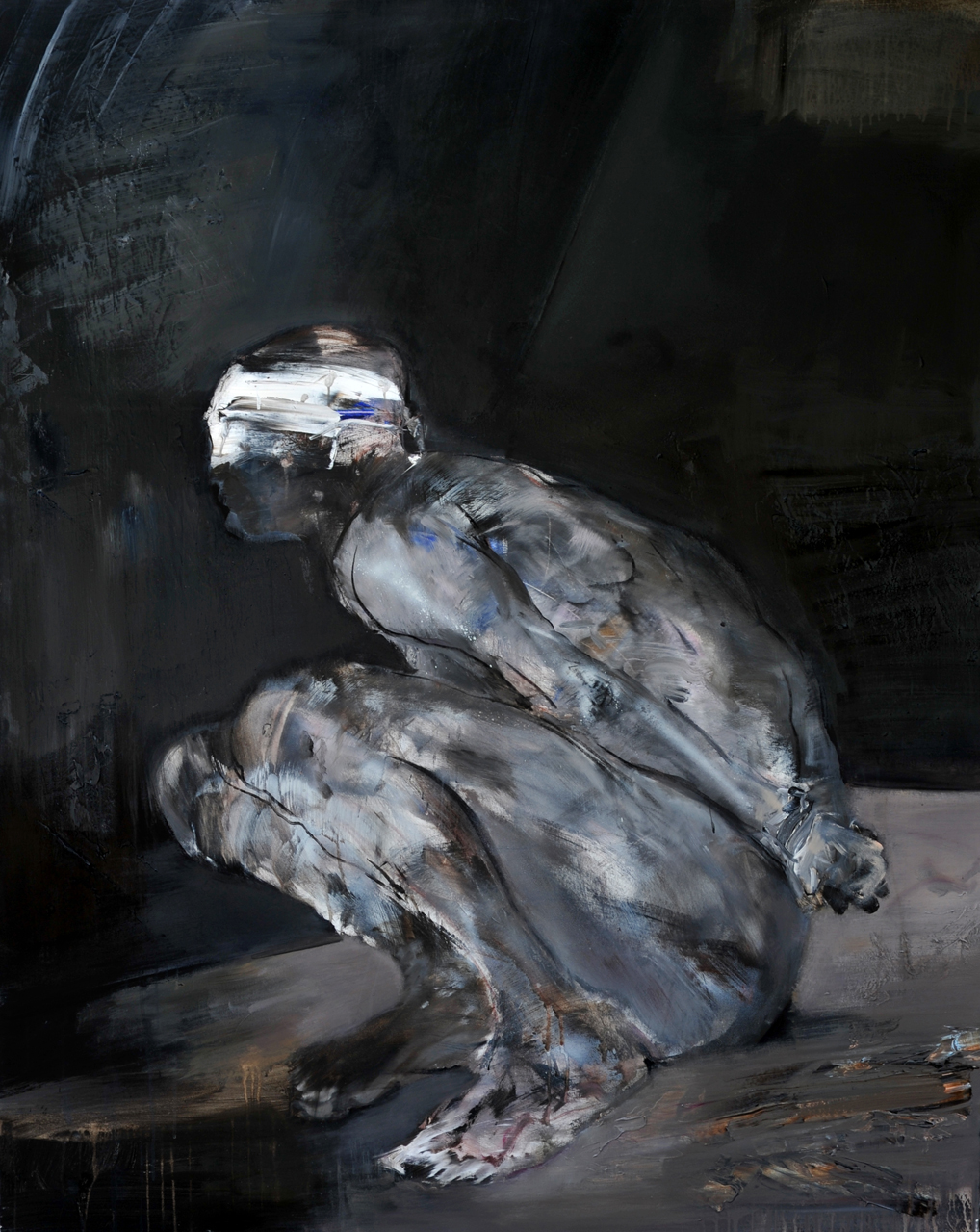
Hostage (2009)

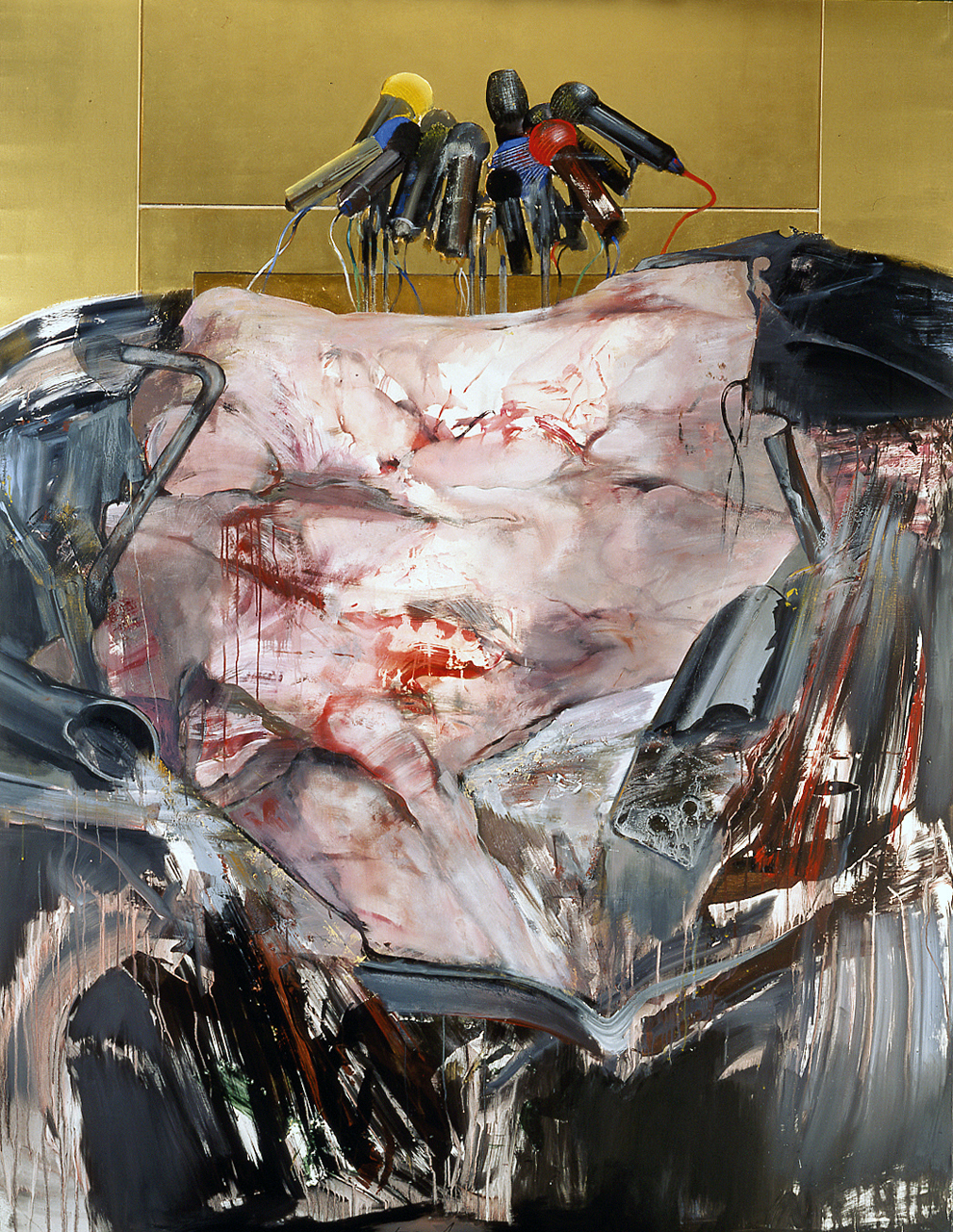
September 11 (2001)

For a long time, the naked human figure became his subject, often depicted in large-scale black and white drawings in ink wash painting (Adam and Eve, 1982). Beauty here is not an object of observation but a matter of everyday life, the black colour of the skin sometimes appearing white in the reflection of sunlight. At other times, the naked bodies are the same colour as their surroundings and appear to emerge from the ground (Maasai, 1985). A symbol of resilience in the harsh conditions of the arid land is the cycle of burnt yet vibrant African palm trees that Franta painted from 1988 to the 1990s. They exude an undying determination to survive, an elemental energy and strength with which they must constantly defy the harsh conditions of life. African nature sometimes bursts with colour against the background of the figures (Paradise, 1985), at other times it is bleakly desolate (Drought, 1986). The recordings from Africa include paintings of domestic animals (Steppe, 1989–1990), their unpathetic deaths (Prey, 1990) and an impressive black and white still life with an animal skull and skeleton (Still Life, 1988).

Franta's paintings of African-Americans in New York have a very different character. They depict seemingly the same human types as in Africa, but the setting is dramatically different - the battered human heads with averted glances in the subway (In the Subway, 1991), street violence (Harlem II - Pushed Against the Wall, 1989), the bleakness of life on the street (Without shelter, 1990, Homeless, 1991), junkyards and landfills (Junkyard, 1992, Warehouse 58, 1993).

A consumer society littered with its own garbage (Large Still Life, 1974) and the devastation of the environment by scrapyards and landfills became an urgent subject for artists of Franta's generation. There are obvious parallels between Theodor Pištěk's installation (Cabinet with Remains, 1993) and Franta's cycle Urban Landscapes (Landfill, 2004), or with the painting cycle by Brno-based Miroslav Štolfa, entitled New Nature.

From New York, Mertl also took away a horrifying experience of human inattention and unwillingness to help when he witnessed a dog attacking a man who had climbed over a fence onto a private building plot (Fury, 1995, Too Late, 1998). Jiří Sozanský is closest to his preoccupation with the abused human body in terms of subject matter among Czech artists, and Vladimir Veličković among foreign artists. Franta has remained sensitive to the horrors of the present, whether it be the Srebrenica massacre (A tribute to Srebrenica, 2002) or the 9/11 tragedy in New York. The depth of incomprehensible human hatred, which cannot even be commented on, is symbolized by the abandoned microphones in the background of the painting (September 11, 2001).

In a series of paintings from 2006, the subject is the African desert, which is encroached upon by civilization with its garbage, but due to its vastness remains untouched by nature (Untamed Land, 2006).

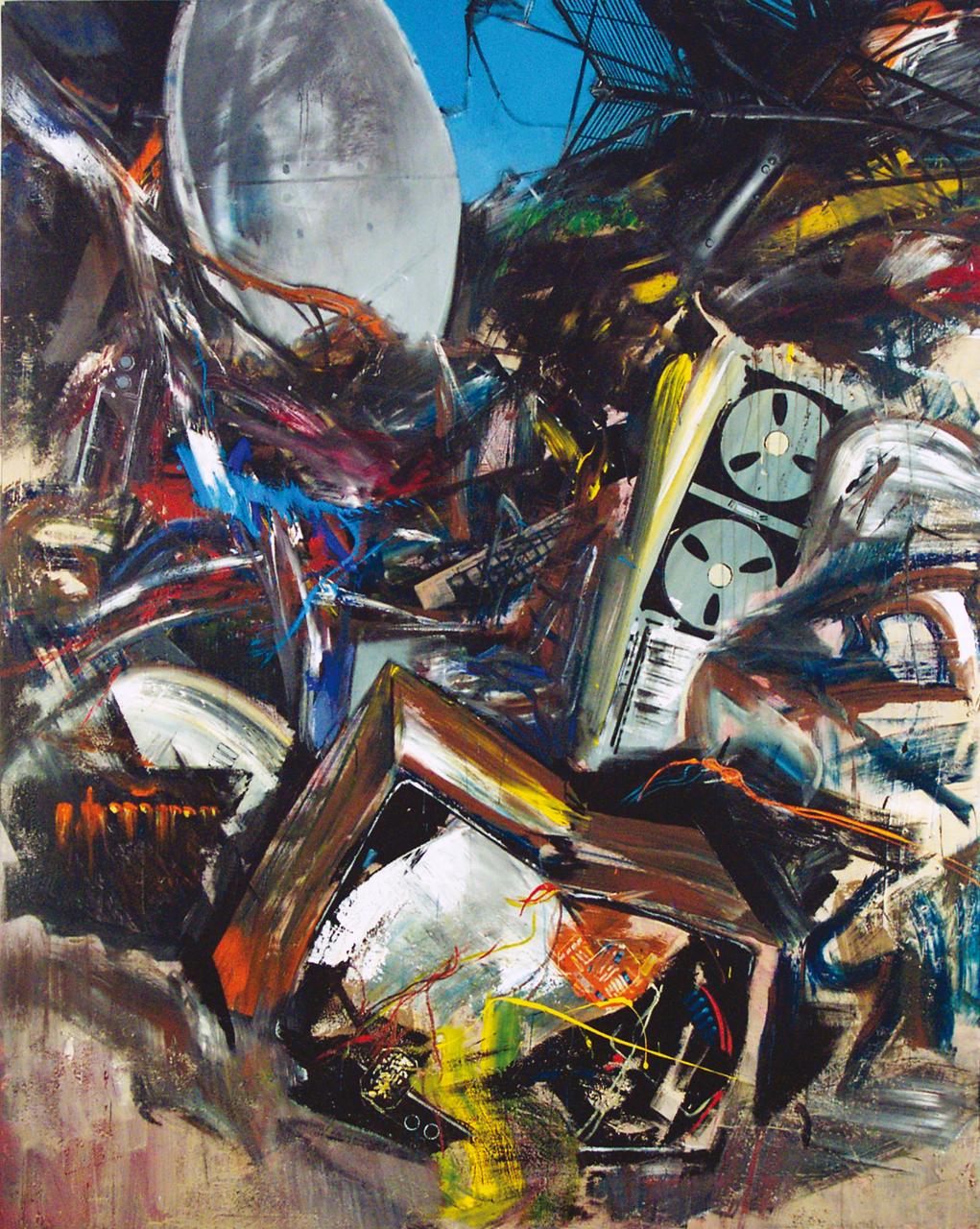
No news (2002)

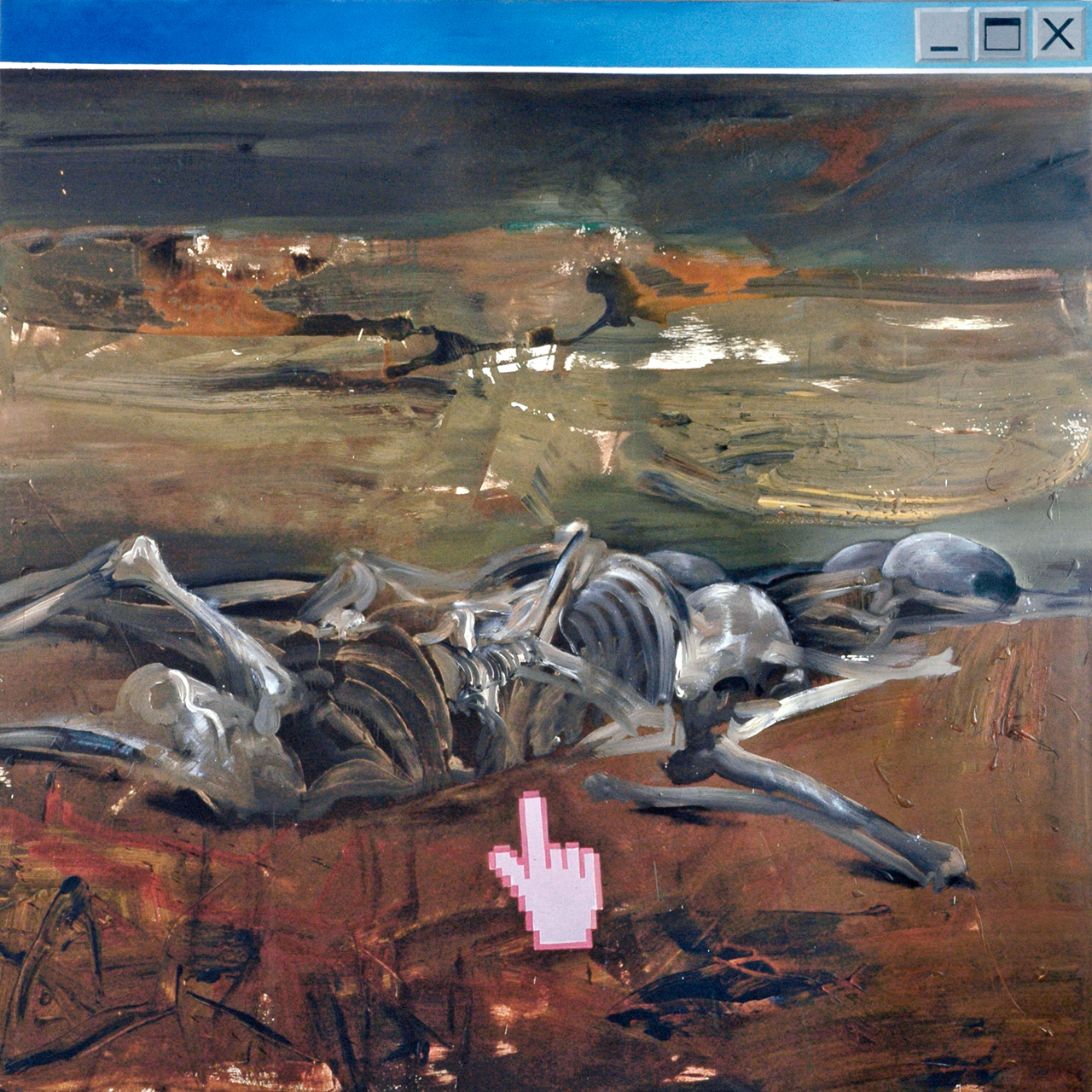
A tribute to Srebrenica (2002)

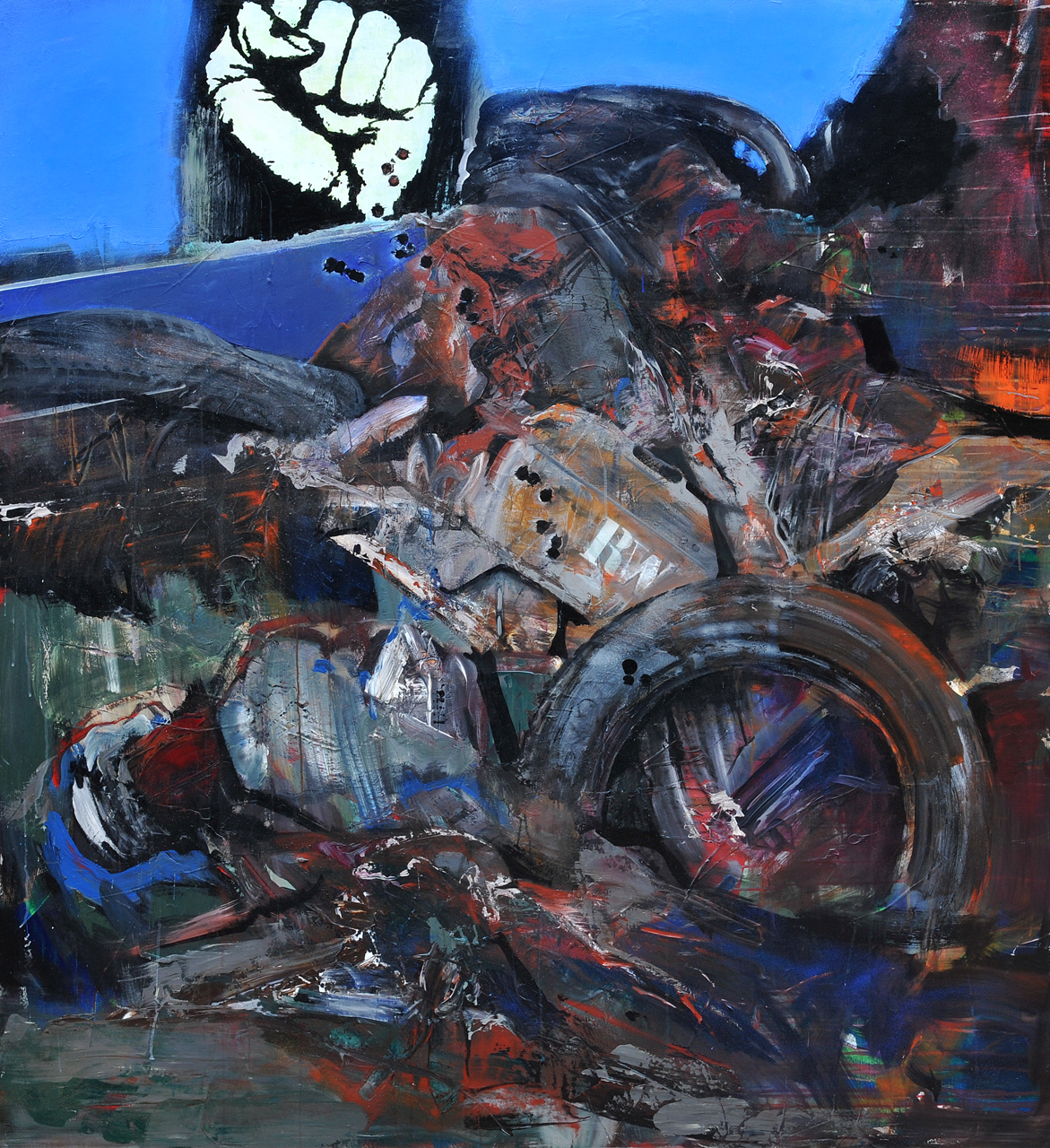
Barricade (2012)

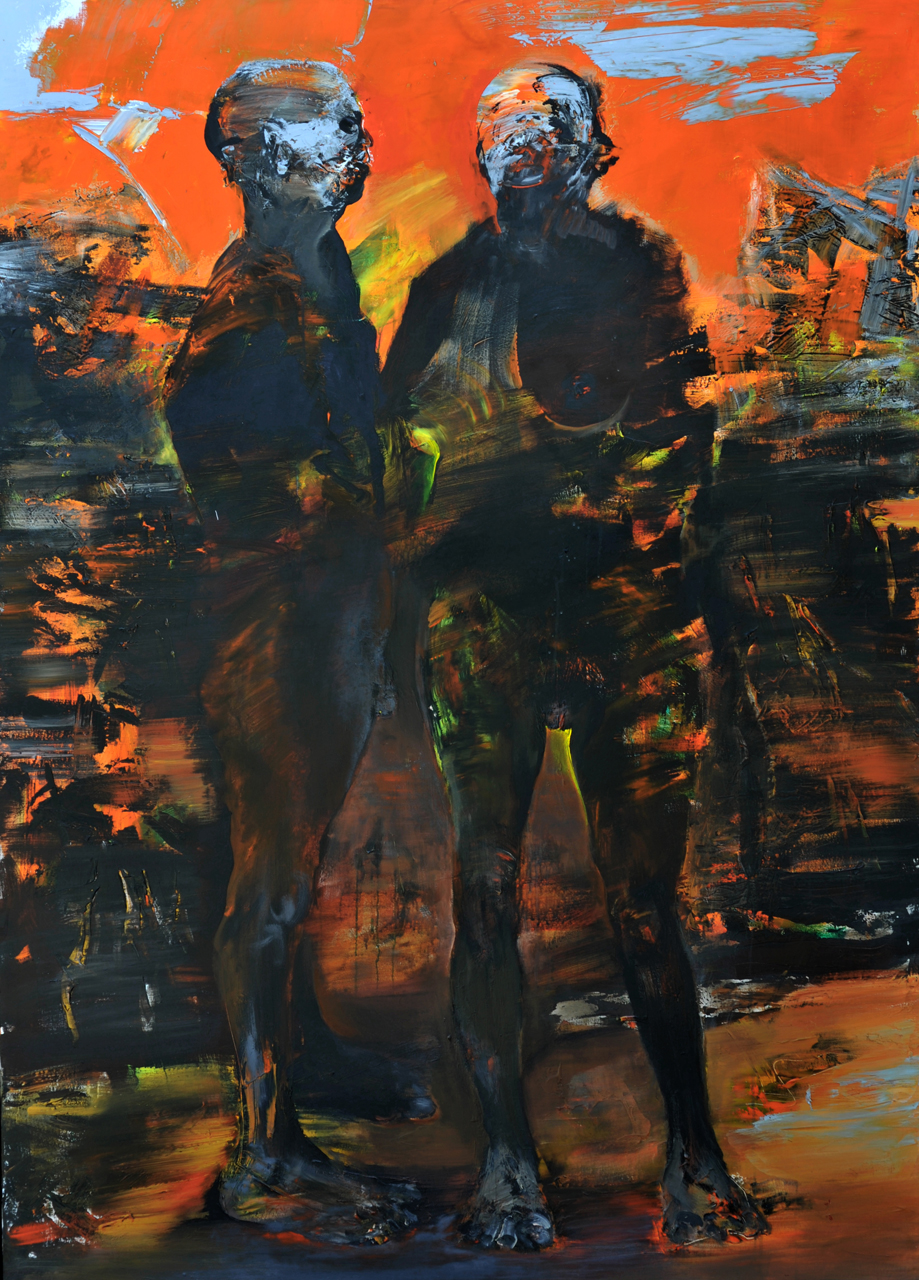
Fukushima (2012)

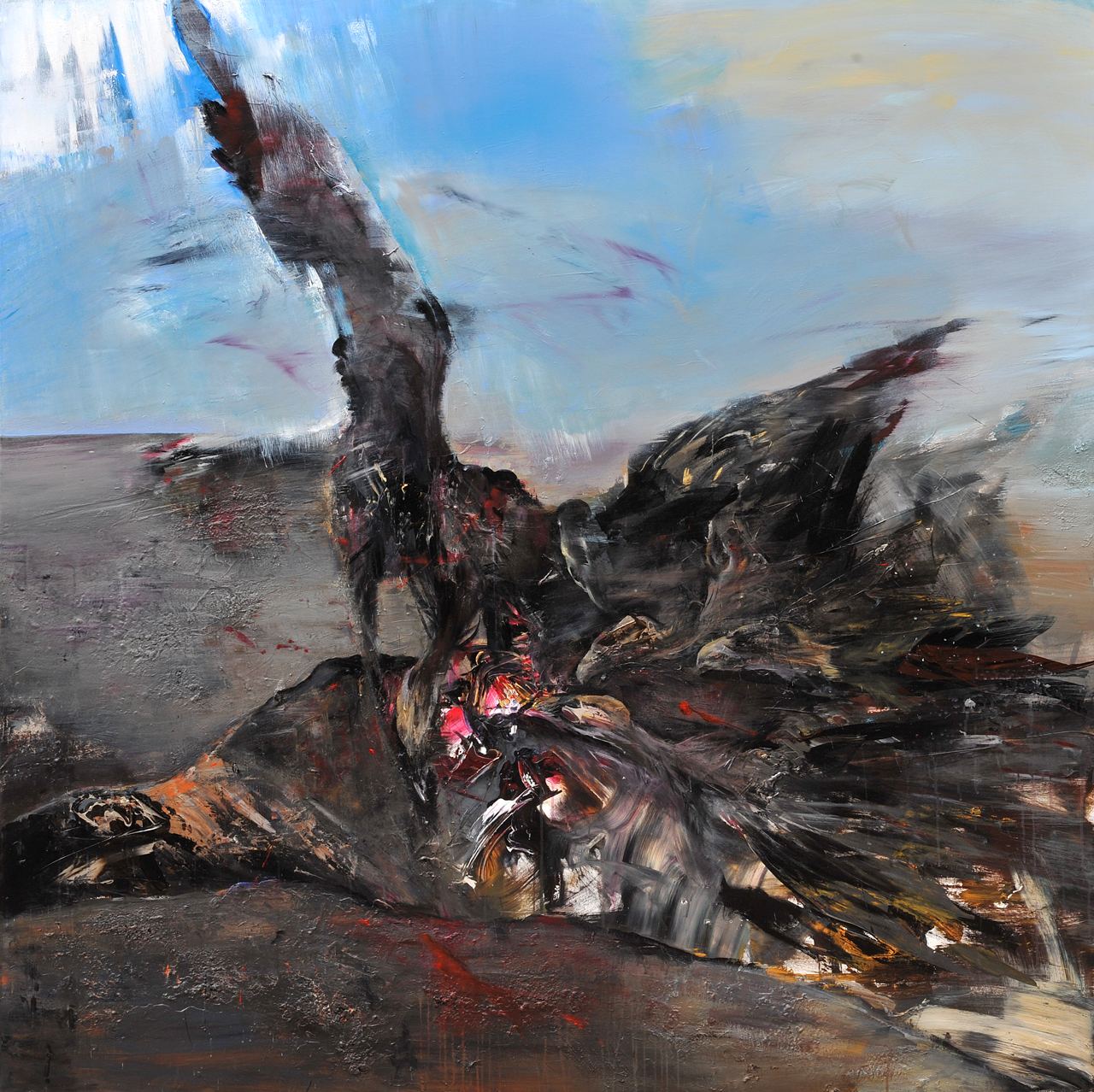
Vultures (2014)

=== Ink drawings ===
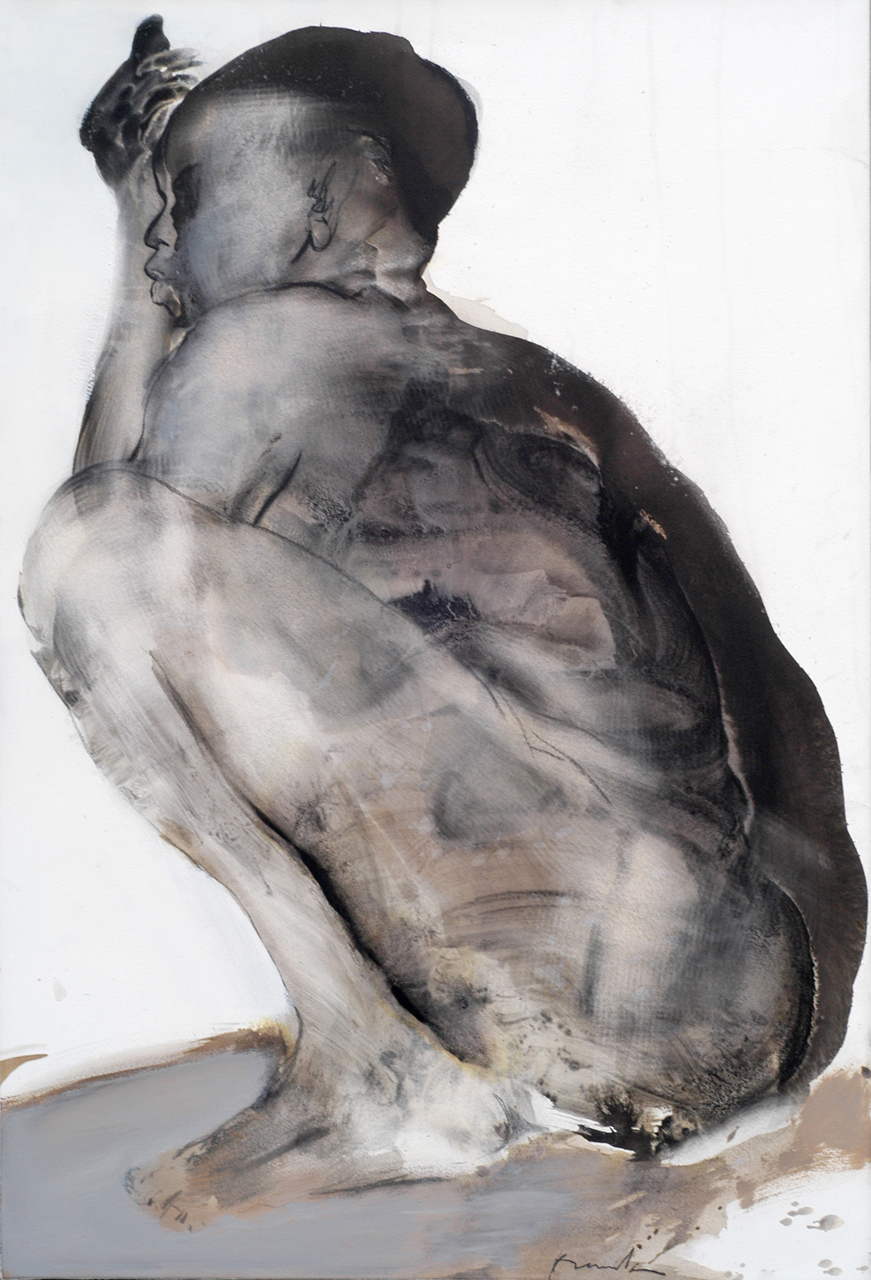
Dreamer Chinese ink on paper (2002)

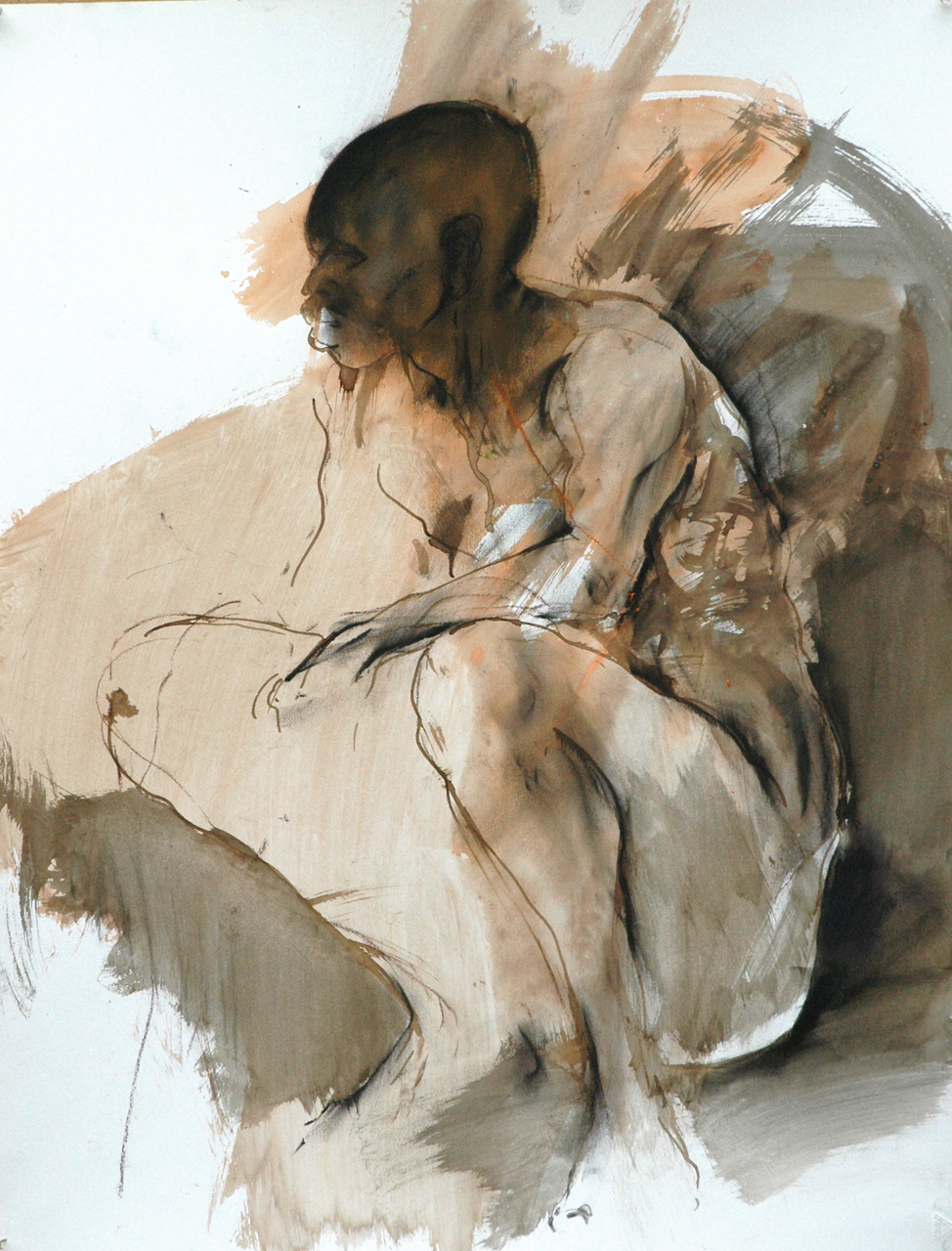
Waiting, colored ink on paper (2005)

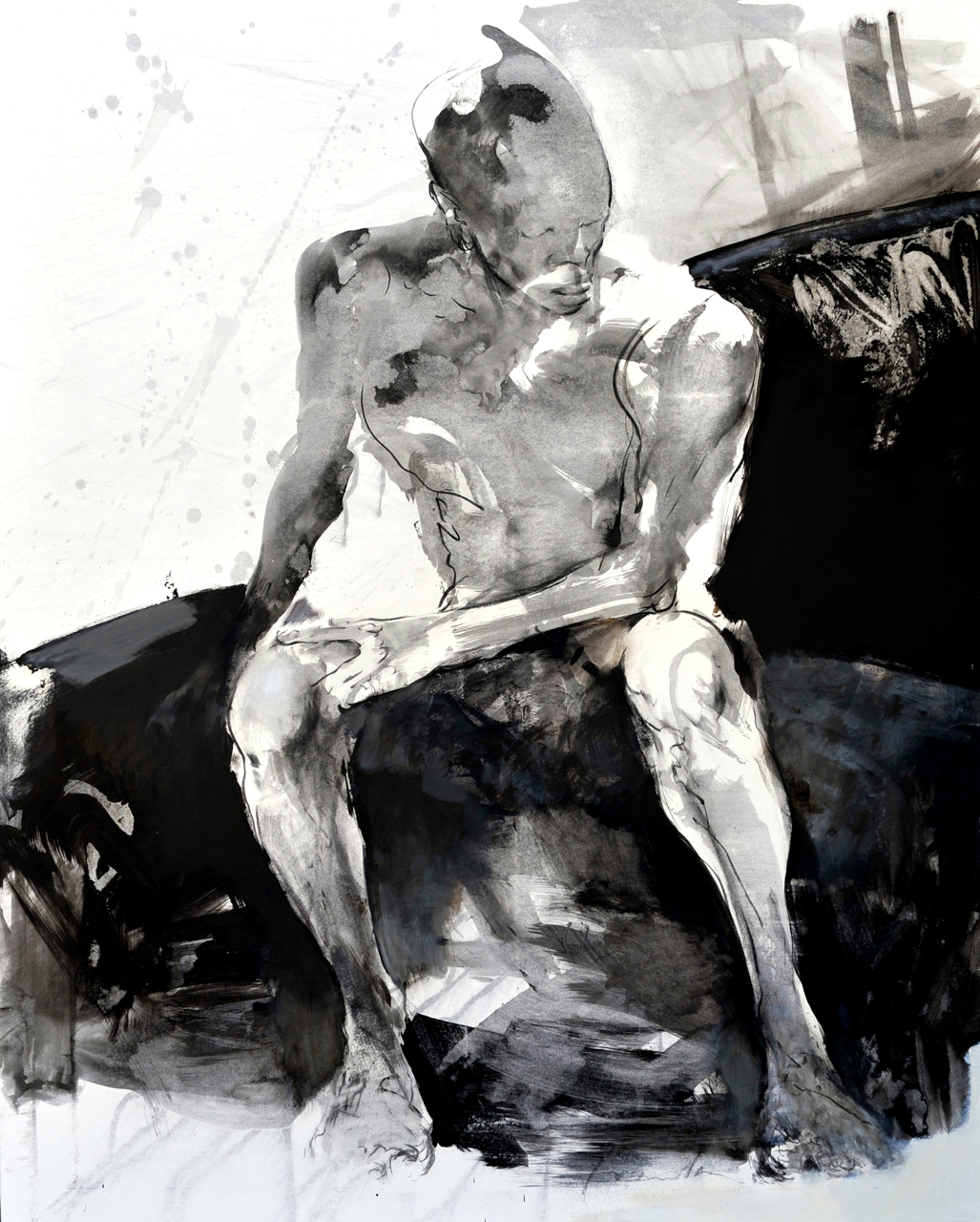
Relaxation, ink wash drawing on paper (2011)

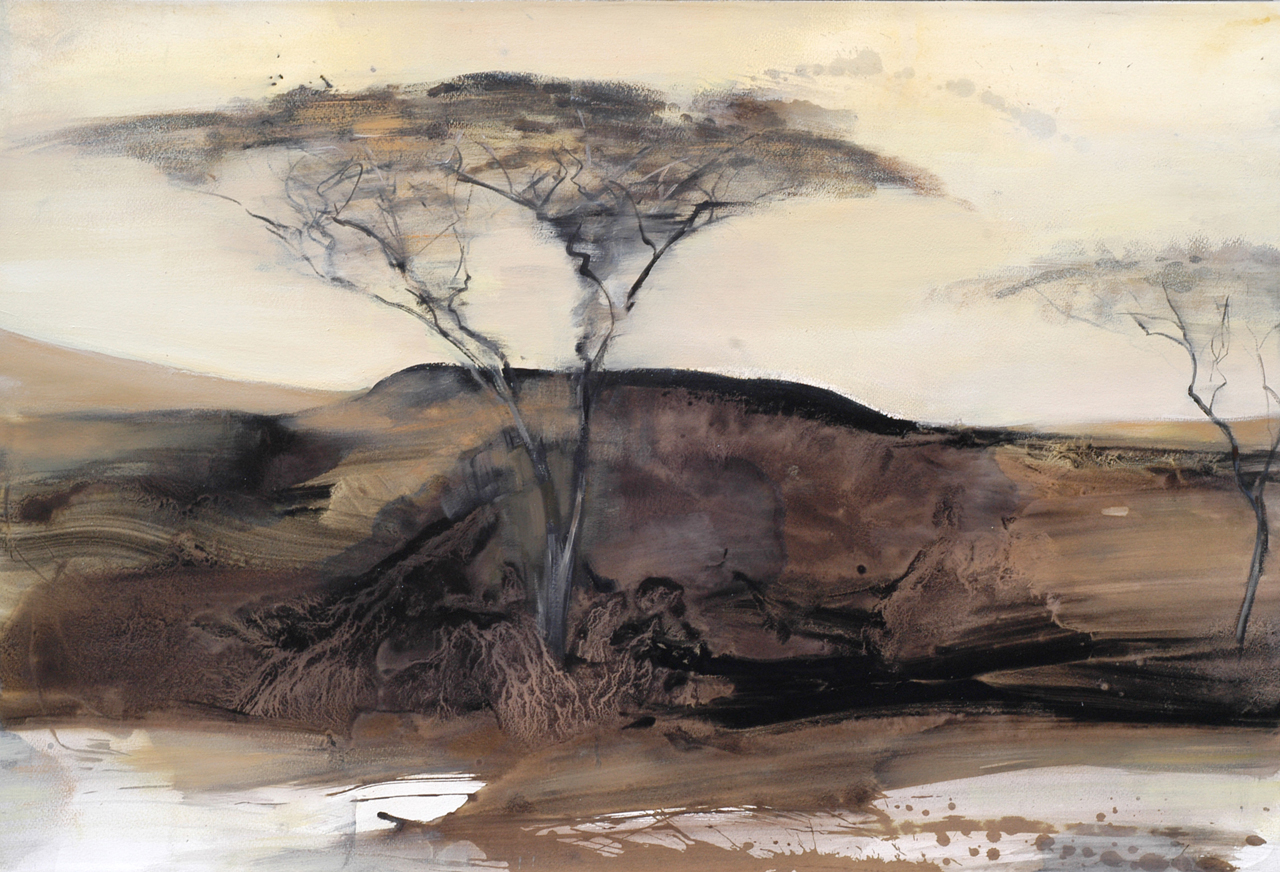
African landscape, coloured ink and gouache on paper (2003)

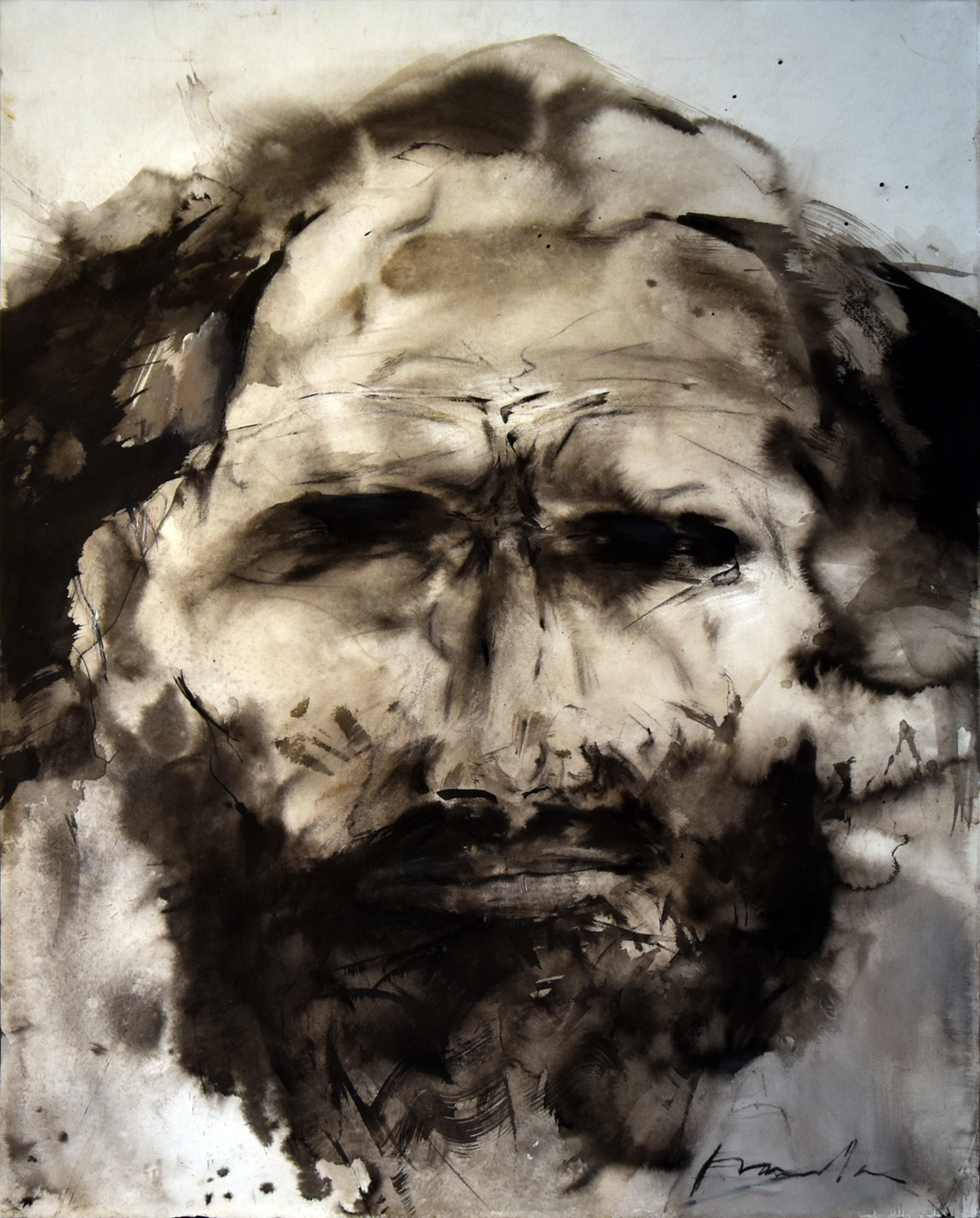
Man from Afghanistan (2022)

=== Sculptures ===
The fascination with the naked human figure that František Mertl brought back from Africa was also at the beginning of his sculptural work. He worked on similar themes and his expressive torsos are more intimate studies of seated or standing black figures (Massai, 1985, Seated Woman, 1988). Mertl's largest sculpture to date is The Eighth Day (1989). This expressive sculpture of a one-armed man with an upraised arm is a symbol of the vulnerability of man, but also emphasises the strength of his soul and his indomitability even in the most difficult moments. The sculpture is also a memorial to Franta's late friend Michel and has become a symbol of the Audabiac civic association, which awards it in a scaled-down form every year as the Rays of Humanity Award. Many studies have been made on the statue, which the artist wanted to use to achieve the strongest possible effect in the final version of his work.

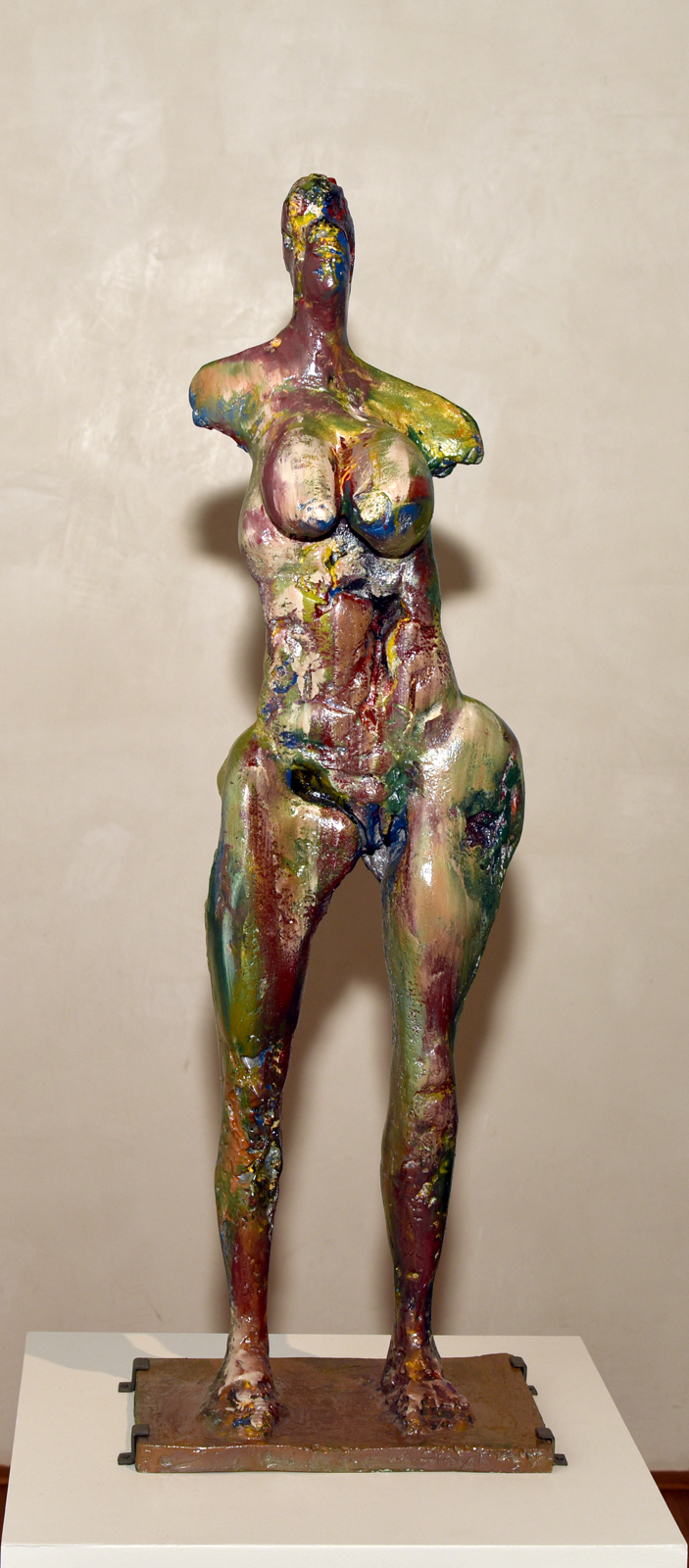
Large Standing Woman (1988)

=== Prints ===
František Mertl works mainly with lithography. He cooperates with Pierre Chave's workshop in Vence, where Marc Chagall, Max Ernst and Jean Dubuffet also printed their prints. His lithographic illustrations are in the books by Katy Remi - La grand peste (1997), Robert Butheau - M... quotidien (1989) and Gilbert Casula - Sirventes (2006).

=== Representation in collections (selection) ===
- National Gallery in Prague
- Museum Kampa - Jan and Meda Mládek Foundation, Prague
- Musée d'Art Moderne de la Ville de Paris (ARC), Paris
- Centre National d'Art Contemporain (Centre Pompidou), Paris
- Bibliothèque nationale de France, Paris
- Cité des Sciences et de l'Industrie, Paris
- Fonds régional d'art contemporain (FNAC), Paris
- Fonds régional d'art contemporain (FRAC), Strasbourg
- Fonds régional d'art contemporain (FRAC), Marseille
- Fonds régional d'art contemporain (FRAC), Reims
- Musée d'art contemporain de Lyon (MAC Lyon), Lyon
- Fondation Maeght (Fondation Marguerite et Aimé Maeght), Saint-Paul-de-Vence
- Fondation Vincent van Gogh Arles, Arles
- Collection de la Ville, Grenoble
- Solomon R. Guggenheim Museum, New York City
- Bronx Museum of the Arts, New York
- Brooklyn Museum, New York
- Hasegawa Collection, Tokyo
- Fondazione Pagani, Legnano
- Foundation Colas, Boulogne-Billancourt
- Foundation Veranneman, Kruishoutem
- Gallery of Contemporary Art - Bunkier Sztuki, Kraków
- Gallery of the Central Bohemian Region (GASK), Kutná Hora
- Gallery of Fine Arts Slovenj Gradec, Slovenj Gradec
- Haggerty Museum of Art, Milwaukee
- Israel Museum, Jerusalem
- Musée Cantini, Marseille
- Musée d'Art Contemporain, Dunkerque
- Musée de la Castre, Cannes
- Musée de la Ville, Menton
- Musée de la Ville, Toulon
- Musée de peinture et de sculpture, Grenoble
- Musée Départemental d'Art Ancien et Contemporain, Épinal
- Musée des Arts Graphiques, Roquebrune-Cap-Martin
- Musée des Beaux-Arts Jules Chéret, Nice
- Musée municipal, Besançon
- Musée Picasso, Antibes
- Museo d'Arte Moderno, Castelanza
- Museum Bochum, Bochum
- Museum Kunstpalast (Kunstmuseum Düsseldorf)
- Brno City Museum
- Regional Gallery of the Highlands in Jihlava
- Terezín Memorial
- Lidice Gallery, Lidice
- West Moravian Museum, Třebíč
- Collection of the city, Sarajevo
- Muzej na sovremena umetnost / The Museum of Contemporary Art, Skopje
- Museum of Contemporary Art of Belgrade MoCAB, Belgrade

=== Exhibitions in the Czech Republic ===
- 1995 Czech Museum of Fine Arts in Prague, in the Cross Corridor Karolina, Prague
- 1997 FRANTA: Selected works 1980 - 1996. Gallery Malovaný dům, Třebíč
- 2009 FRANTA - František Mertl. Egon Schiele Art Center Český Krumlov
- 2009 FRANTA, Brno City Museum at Špilberk
- 2012 FRANTA (paintings - sculptures), Museum Kampa, Prague
- 2012 FRANTA - selection of works (paintings), Nová síň Gallery, Prague
- 2015 FRANTA - selection of works, Gallery of Fine Arts in Ostrava
- 2017 Franta - from private collections, Museum of Vysočina Třebíč
- 2025 FRANTA - retrospective exhibition, Riding Hall of the Prague Castle

=== Exhibitions abroad ===
More than 120 solo exhibitions in Europe, USA, Japan. In group exhibitions he was represented alongside artists such as Pablo Picasso, Marc Chagall, Max Ernst, Joan Miró, Antoni Tàpies, Henri Matisse, etc.

== Sources ==
=== Monographs ===
- FRANTA in the collections of Czech private collectors, Třebíč: Museum of Vysočina Třebíč 2017, ISBN 978-80-86894-41-6
- Duňa Panenková (ed.), Franta, publisher Gallery Jaroslav Kořán, Prague 2009, ISBN 978-80-86990-72-9
- Jean Luc Chalumeau, Franta, (130 colour reproductions), Somogy éditions d'art, Paris 2007, ISBN 9782757200940
- Evelyne Artaud et al., Franta, (146 reproductions), Cercle d'Art, Paris, Düsseldorf 2000, ISBN 9782702205907
- Bernard Noël, introduction by Thomas Messer, Franta. Peintures et travaux sur papier / Paintings and works on paper, (109 reproductions), Mage Publisher Inc., Washington DC 1987, ISBN 9780934211031
- Franta, travaux sur papier et peintures, interview with Michéle Demoulin, (36 reproductions) Éd. Limage/Alin Avila, Cahier 4, 1981
- Franta, Parcours 1968–1979, (24 colour reproductions), Theimer 1979

=== Diploma theses ===
- Jitka Fischerová, Painter Franta (František Mertl) and his classmates from the Academy of Fine Arts in Prague: a comparison of works, Bachelor thesis, UHV, FF MUNI Brno 2017 Online
- Céline Berge, L'Expérience de l'exil travers l'oeuvre picturale de Franta, University of Toulouse II-Le Mirail 2004

=== Encyclopaedic publications (selection) ===
- L'art depuis 1945, Bruxelles 1972
- La Grande Histoire de la peinture moderne, Tendance d'ajourd'hui, Skira 1982
- Bénamou Genéviève, Sensibilités Contemporaines, 70 artistes d'origine tchèque et slovaque hors Tchécoslovaquie, éd. G.B., 1985
- Grand Larousse universel, supplément, Paris, éd. Larousse 1992
- Parent Francis, Entendre l'écrit, Paris, E.C. édition 2000
- Delarge, Jean-Pierre, Dictionnaire des arts plastiques modernes et contemporains, éd. Gründ 2003
- Figuration contemporaine / Les corps, Édition AZART 2006
