= Véronique Joumard =

French artist

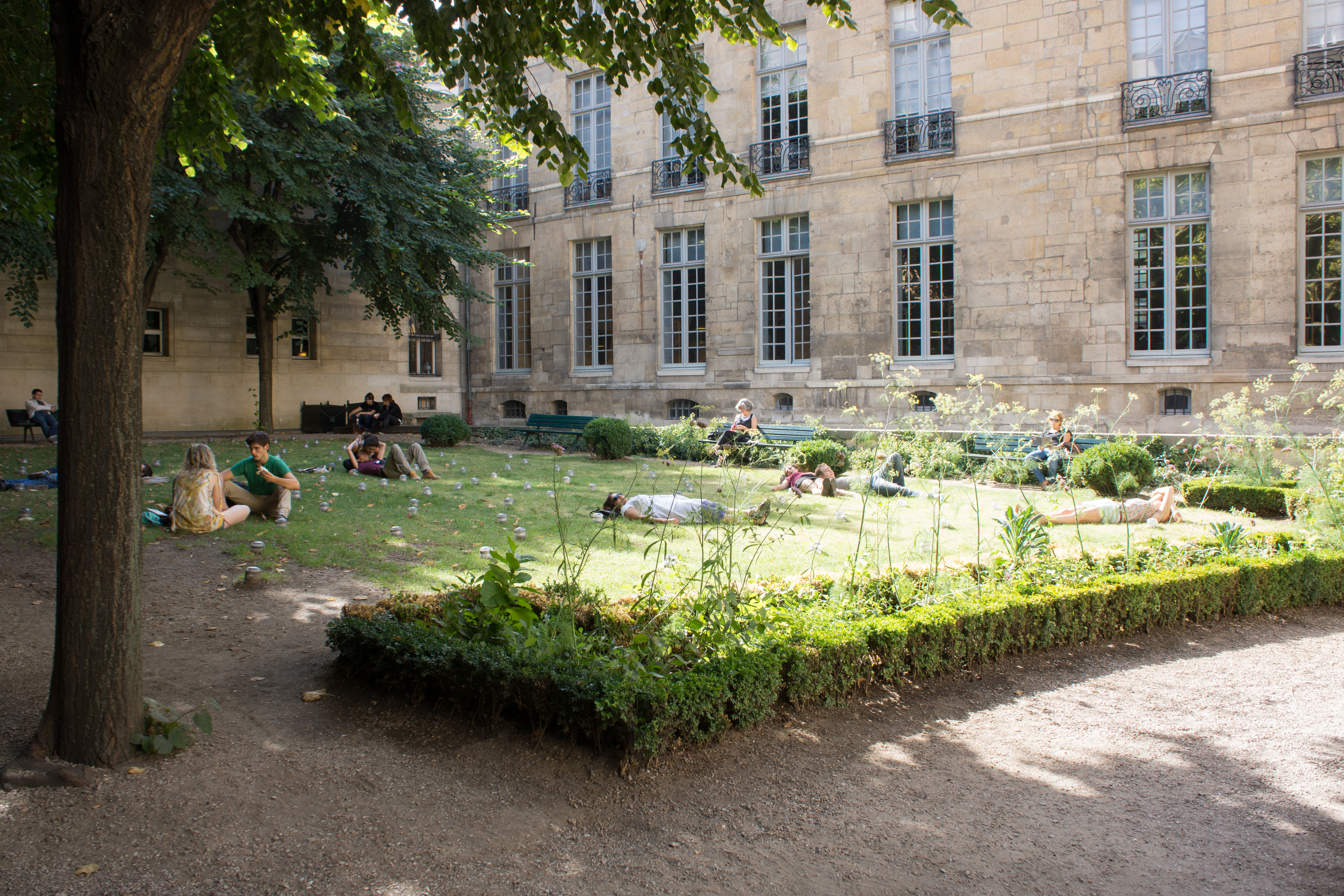
- Éclats verts, jaunes, rouges installed at Mark Ashton Garden, 2004
- Born: 1964; Grenoble, France
- Education: École supérieure d'Art de Grenoble
- Known for: Visual art, installation, photography
- Awards: Opline Prize 2018
- Website: www.veronique-joumard.net

Véronique Joumard (born 1964 in Grenoble) is a French artist.

== Biography ==
=== Early life and studies ===
Véronique Joumard was born in Grenoble, France in 1964.

She studied at the École supérieure d'Art de Grenoble, and began her career as an artist in 1987 with an exhibition at the Villa Arson in Nice.

== Career ==
=== Specificity of her work ===
Véronique Joumard is a photographer, videographer, sculptor and installation artist. She is represented by the parisian gallery Gilles Drouault, galerie/multiples.

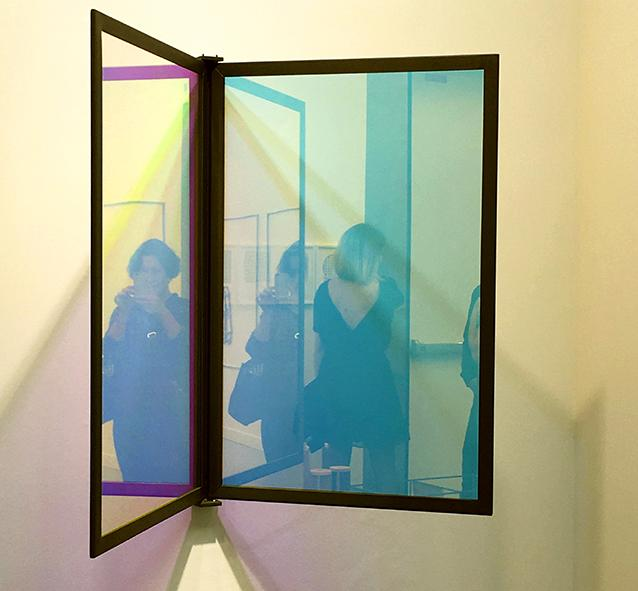
Photograph of artist Véronique Joumard taken in the mirror of one of her artworks

Most of her projects are in relation with light and interact with the exhibition space. Véronique Joumard is known for working with technical devices making energy visible. Her work invites the public to physically experiment its environment. If her work can recall minimalism, Véronique Joumard constantly enriches it of new and specific elements: mirrors, thermosensitive painting, etc.

Véronique Joumard is also a teacher at the École Nationale Supérieure d'Art de Paris-Cergy (ENSAPC).

=== Exhibitions, commissions and residencies ===
Véronique Joumard has participated in exhibitions in art centres, museums and galleries in France and abroad. Her work has been shown in exhibitions at the Setouchi Triennale in Takamatsu Japan, in the Kunsthaus Baselland in Muttenz, Switzerland, at the Mudam in Luxembourg, the Credac in Ivry-sur-Seine in France, among others.

She has completed several public commissions in France, where she notably works on the recreation of the vitraux of the Cathédrale de Bayeux, as well as in Italy and Japan.

Véronique Joumard was a pensionate of the Villa Kujoyama (Kyoto, Japan) in 1996.

== Bibliography ==
- Véronique Joumard, Oeuvres 1985-1998, Dijon, Le Consortium, 1998, ISBN 978-3-906539133
- Véronique Journard, Dijon : Les presse du réel, 2010, ISBN 978-2-84066-362-1
