= École supérieure d'Art de Grenoble =

School of Fine Arts in France

Coordinates: 45°11′12″N 5°43′36″E

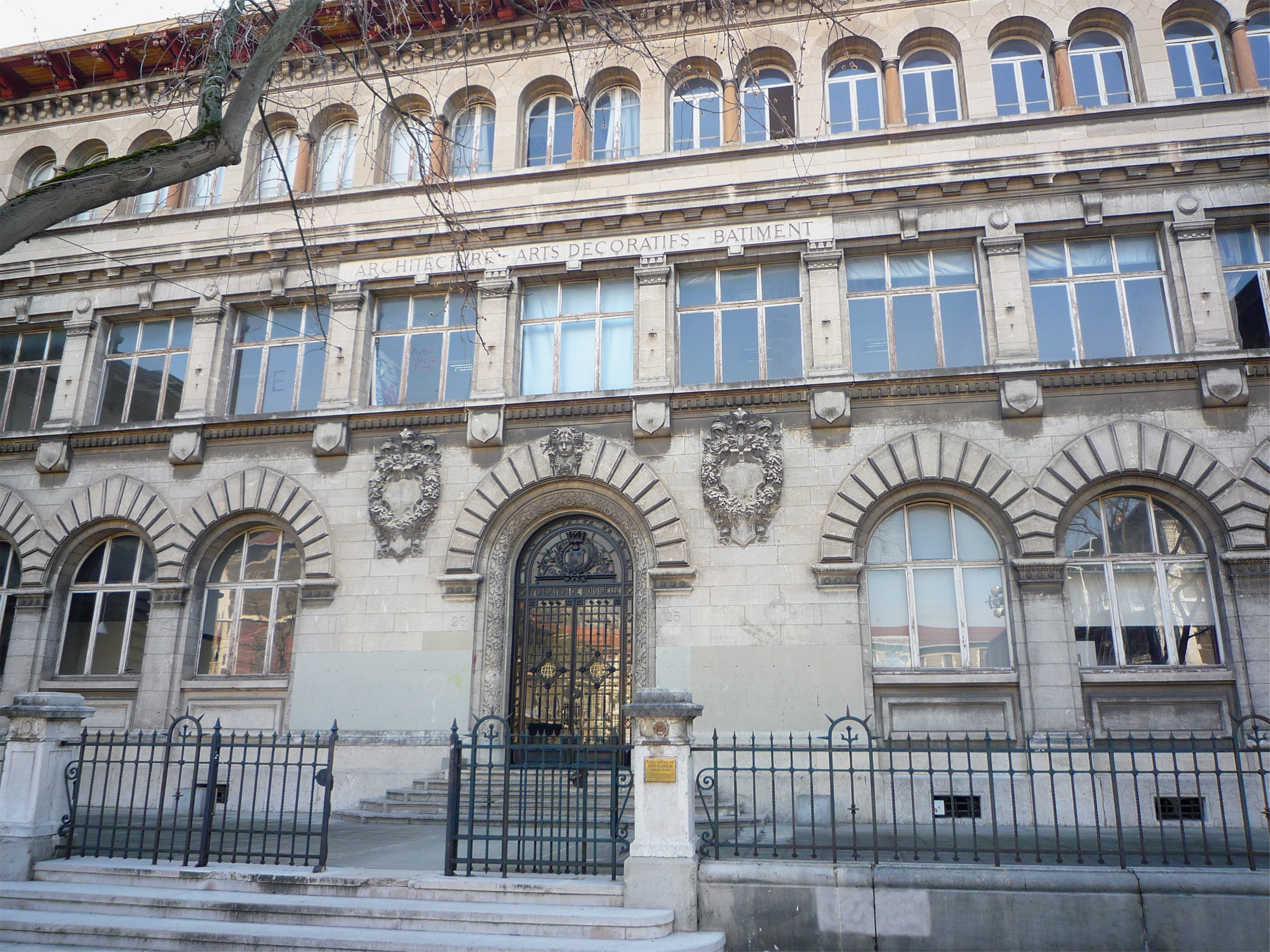

Location
- Grenoble; France

Information
- Other names: École supérieure d'art et design Grenoble Valence; ÉSAD Grenoble Valence
- Website: esad-gv.fr

École supérieure d'Art de Grenoble is a school of Fine Arts in Grenoble, France.

== Notable graduates ==
- Samuel Rousseau
- Matthieu Laurette
- Barthélémy Toguo
- Dominique Gonzalez-Foerster
- Véronique Joumard
- Philippe Parreno
- Pierre Joseph
- Bertrand Planes
