= Pierre-Joseph =

Pierre-Joseph (also Pierre Joseph) is a given name and can refer to:

- Pierre-Joseph Alary, (1689–1770), French ecclesiastic and writer
- Pierre-Joseph Amoreux (1741–1824) French physician and naturalist
- Pierre Joseph Bonnaterre (1752–1804), French naturalist
- Pierre-Joseph Bourcet (1700–1780), French tactician, general, chief of staff, mapmaker and military educator
- Pierre-Joseph Cambon, (1756–1820), French statesman
- Arthur Cardin (1879–1946), Canadian politician
- Pierre-Joseph-Olivier Chauveau (1820–1890), first Premier of the Canadian province of Quebec
- Pierre-Joseph Thoulier d'Olivet (1682–1768), French abbot, writer, grammarian and French translator
- Pigneau de Behaine (1741–1799), French Catholic priest, helped establish Vietnamese Nguyễn Dynasty after Tây Sơn rebellion
- Pierre Joseph Céloron de Blainville (1693–1759), French Canadian Officer of Marine
- Pierre-Joseph Desault, (1738–1795), French anatomist and surgeon
- Pierre Macquer (1718–1784), French chemist
- Pierre Joseph Pelletier (1788–1842), French chemist
- Pierre-Joseph Proudhon (1809–1865), French politician, mutualist philosopher and socialist
- Pierre-Joseph Redouté (1759–1840), Belgian painter and botanist
- Amédée Tremblay (1876–1949), Canadian organist, composer, and music educator
- Pierre-Joseph van Beneden (1809–1894), Belgian zoologist and paleontologist

== See also ==
- Pierre-Joseph-Marie Chaumonot (1611–1693) French-Canadian Catholic missionary
- Pierre-Joseph-Guillaume Zimmermann (1785–1853), French pianist, composer, and music teacher
- Pierre-Joseph-Justin Bernard (1708–1775), French military man and salon poet
