= Mykola =

Mykola (Ukrainian: Микола, IPA: [mɪˈkɔlɐ]) is a Ukrainian variant of the masculine name "Nicholas", meaning "victory of the people". It may refer to:

== People ==
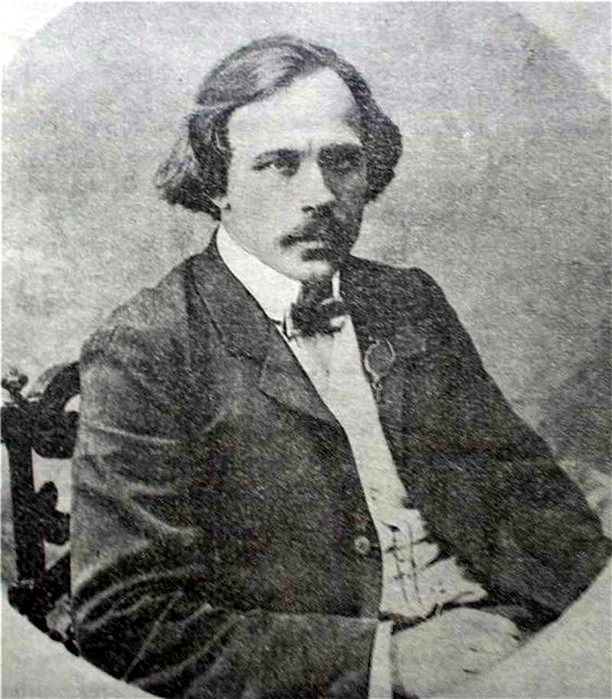
Mykola Voronyi (1871–1938), Ukrainian writer, poet, actor, director, and political activist

- Mykola Arkas (1853–1909), Ukrainian composer, writer, historian, and cultural activist
- Mykola Avilov (born 1948), Ukrainian Soviet decathlete, competed at the 1968, 1972 and 1976 Olympics
- Mykola Azarov (born 1947), Ukrainian politician, Prime Minister of Ukraine from 2010 to 2014
- Mykola Babak (born 1954) is a Ukrainian artist, writer, publisher, and art collector
- Mykola Bahlay (born 1976), Ukrainian football forward
- Mykola Bakay (1931–1998), Ukrainian singer, composer, poet, author and Soviet dissident
- Mykola Balan, Ukrainian military official, Lieutenant General, a commander of the National Guard of Ukraine
- Mykola Bazhan (1904–1983), Soviet Ukrainian writer, poet and politician
- Mykola Belokurov (1926–2006), Soviet middle-distance runner
- Mykola Berezutskiy (born 1937), Ukrainian hurdler
- Mykola Bevz (born 1954), Ukrainian scientist, architect, member of ICOMOS
- Mykola Biliashivsky (1867–1926), Ukrainian archaeologist, ethnographer, art historian
- Mykola Bilokon (born 1955), Ukrainian politician, Minister of Internal Affairs of Ukraine (2003–2005)
- Mykola Bohuslavsky (1850–1933), organiser & sponsor of the kobzar renaissance in the Kuban, a community leader, publisher
- Mykola Budnyk, luthier and traditional performer in the Kobzar tradition
- Mykola Burachek (1871–1942), Ukrainian Impressionist painter and pedagogue
- Mykola Butsenko (born 1991), Ukrainian amateur boxer
- Mykola Buy (born 1996), professional Ukrainian football midfielder
- Mykola Bychok (born 1980), cardinal and catholic Ukrainian bishop
- Mykola Chaban, Soviet and Ukrainian journalist, Ukrainian prose writer, specialist in Dnipropetrovsk region
- Mykola Chupryna (born 1962), Ukrainian rower
- Mykola Dementiuk (born 1949), American author
- Mykola Dibrova, Ukrainian Paralympic athlete with cerebral palsy
- Mykola Dmitrishin (born 1990), Ukrainian badminton player
- Mykola Dovhan (born 1955), Ukrainian Olympic rower
- Mykola Dzhyha (born 1949), Ukrainian career militsiya officer and later politician, member of the Verkhovna Rada
- Mykola Fedorenko (born 1955), Soviet football player, current Ukrainian football coach
- Mykola Fedoruk (1954–2025), Ukrainian politician, mayor of Chernivtsi
- Mykola Fomin (1905–1975), Soviet football player
- Mykola Fominykh (1927–1996), Soviet football coach and football administrator
- Mykola Gogol (1809–1852), Ukrainian-born writer who wrote in Russian because the Ukrainian language was banned in the Russian Empire
- Mykola Grigoriev (1885–1919), paramilitary leader noted for numerous switching of sides during the civil war in Ukraine
- Mykola Hlushchenko (1901–1977), Ukrainian artist
- Mykola Hnatyuk (born 1952), Soviet, Ukrainian singer, popular in the early 1980s
- Mykola Hobdych (born 1961), Ukrainian choral conductor, founder and director of the Kyiv Chamber Choir
- Mykola Holonyak (1928–2022), American engineer and educator
- Mykola Holovko (1937–2004), Ukrainian football (soccer) player and coach
- Mykola Holubets (1891–1942), Ukrainian historian, archivist, local historian, art historian, poet, prose writer, publicist, editor, translator, and bibliographer.
- Mykola Horbal (born 1940), Ukrainian dissident, human right activist, member of parliament of Ukraine
- Mykola Hordiychuk (born 1983), Ukrainian weightlifter
- Mykola Hrabar, self-nominated candidate in the 2004 Ukrainian presidential election
- Mykola Hreshta (born 1984), Ukrainian footballer
- Mykola Hrinchenko (born 1986), professional Ukrainian football midfielder
- Mykola Hulak (1821–1899), Ukrainian political and cultural activist, journalist, scientist, interpreter, lawyer
- Mykola Ischenko (born 1983), Ukrainian footballer
- Mykola Ivanovych Tseluiko (1937–2007), Ukrainian painter and textile artist
- Mykola Ivasyuk (1865–1937), Ukrainian painter; executed during the Great Purge
- Mykola Kanevets, Artistic Director & Ballet Master of the Cheremosh Ukrainian Dance Company in Edmonton, Alberta, Canada
- Mykola Kapustiansky (1879–1969), General in the army of the Ukrainian National Republic, founder of the Organization of Ukrainian Nationalists
- Mykola Karpov (1929–2003), Ukrainian playwright
- Mykola Karpuk (born 1982), Ukrainian bodybuilder and personal trainer
- Mykola Karpyuk, Ukrainian political activist, former vice leader of the UNA-UNSO, member of the central council of the Right Sector
- Mykola Katerynchuk, Ukrainian politician and lawyer, former member of the Ukrainian parliament
- Mykola Khvylovy (1893–1933), Ukrainian writer and poet of the early Communist era Ukrainian Renaissance (1920–1930)
- Mykola Kmit (born 1966), Ukrainian politician and the former head of the Lviv Oblast State Administration
- Mykola Kniazhytskyi (born 1968), Ukrainian journalist, People's Deputy of Ukraine, Head of the Committee on Culture and Spirituality
- Mykola Kolessa (1903–2006), Ukrainian composer and conductor
- Mykola Koltsov (1936–2011), Soviet footballer and Ukrainian football children and youth trainer
- Mykola Kolumbet (1933–2012), Ukrainian cyclist
- Mykola Komarov (born 1961), Ukrainian rower who competed for the Soviet Union in the 1988 Summer Olympics
- Mykola Kondratyuk (1931–2006), Soviet and Ukrainian Chamber concert and opera singer (baritone), educator, social activist
- Mykola Konrad, Ukrainian Greek Catholic priest who became a martyr in 1941
- Mykola Kostyak (born 1954), Ukrainian politician
- Mykola Koval (born 1952), Belarusian-born operatic baritone
- Mykola Kovtalyuk (born 1995), Ukrainian football forward
- Mykola Kravchenko (1983 – 2022), Ukrainian public and political figure, historian
- Mykola Kremer, Ukrainian sprint canoeist who has competed since the late 2000s
- Mykola Krotov (1898–1978), Ukrainian and Soviet football player and manager
- Mykola Krupnyk (born 1972), Ukrainian biathlete
- Mykola Kucher (born 1959), Ukrainian politician and entrepreneur
- Mykola Kudrytsky (born 1962), Ukrainian professional football player
- Mykola Kulinich (born 1953), Ukrainian diplomat
- Mykola Kulish (1892–1937), Ukrainian prose writer, playwright, pedagogue, veteran of World War I, Red Army veteran
- Mykola Kut (born 1952), Ukrainian artist
- Mykola Kvasnyi (born 1995), Ukrainian football defender
- Mykola Labovskyi (born 1983), Ukrainian middle-distance runner
- Mykola Lahun, Ukrainian businessman, the majority shareholder and the Chairman of the Supervisory Board of JSC Delta Bank
- Mykola Lebed (1909–1998), Ukrainian political activist, Ukrainian nationalist, and guerrilla fighter
- Mykola Lebid (1936–2007), Ukrainian painter, graphic artist, designer, Honored Artist of Ukraine, and professor
- Mykola Lemyk (1914–1941), Ukrainian political activist and leader of the Organization of Ukrainian Nationalists
- Mykola Leontovych (1877–1921), Ukrainian composer, choral conductor, and teacher
- Mykola Liubynsky (died 1938), Ukrainian politician and diplomat
- Mykola Livytskyi (1907–1989), Ukrainian politician and journalist
- Mykola Luchok (born 1974), Ukrainian prelate of the Latin Church of the Catholic Church, Titular Bishop of Giru Marcelli, Auxiliary bishop of Diocese of Mukachevo
- Mykola Lukash (1919–1988), Ukrainian literary translator, theorist and lexicographer
- Mykola Lysenko (1842–1912), Ukrainian musician and composer
- Mykola Lytvyn, chief of the State Border Guard Service of Ukraine, General of the Army of Ukraine
- Mykola Lytvyn (footballer) (born 1963), professional Ukrainian football coach and former player
- Mykola Makhynia (1912–1990), Soviet and Ukrainian football player and coach
- Mykola Malomuzh (born 1955), Ukrainian politician, General of the army of Ukraine
- Mykola Marchak (1904–1938), Ukrainian and Soviet politician, acting Chairman of the Council of People's Commissars of the Ukrainian SSR
- Mykola Marchenko (1943–2018), sculptor, a representative of realism in Ukrainian art
- Mykola Markevych (1804–1860), Russian Imperial historian, ethnographer, musician and poet of Ukrainian Cossack descent
- Mykola Martynenko (born 1961), Ukrainian politician
- Mykola Matviyenko (born 1996), Ukrainian football left defender
- Mykola Medin (born 1972), Ukrainian professional football coach and a former player
- Mykola Melnychenko (born 1966), bodyguard of Leonid Kuchma (President of Ukraine), an officer of the State Security Administration
- Mykola Melnyk (1953–2013), Ukrainian pilot and liquidator hero renowned for his high-risk helicopter mission on the dangerously-radioactive Chernobyl Nuclear Power Plant
- Mykola Mikhnovsky (1873–1924), Ukrainian political and social activist, lawyer, journalist, founder, ideologue and leader of a Ukrainian independence movement
- Mykola Milchev (born 1967), Ukrainian sports shooter and 2000 Olympic skeet champion
- Mykola Morozyuk (born 1988), Ukrainian footballer
- Mykola Mozghovyi (1947–2010), Ukrainian and Soviet composer, producer, and songwriter
- Mykola Musiyenko (born 1959), Ukrainian former triple jumper who represented the Soviet Union and later Ukraine
- Mykola Musolitin (born 1999), professional Ukrainian football midfielder
- Mykola Mykhailov (1903–1936), Ukrainian bandurist, composer and arranger
- Mykola Nakonechnyi (born 1981), retired Ukrainian football player
- Mykola Nechyporuk (1952–2025), Ukrainian scientist
- Mykola Ovsianiko-Kulikovsky (1768–1846), purported author of a famous musical hoax Symphony No. 21, perpetrated by composer and violinist Mikhail Goldstein
- Mykola Pavlenko (born 1979), Ukrainian football player
- Mykola Pavlov (born 1954), former Ukrainian football defender, former head-coach of Illychivets Mariupol in the Ukrainian Premier League
- Mykola Pavlyuk (born 1995), professional Ukrainian football defender
- Mykola Pawluk (born 1956), television video editor over four decades
- Mykola Pinchuk (born 1946), retired Ukrainian and Soviet football player
- Mykola Plaviuk (1925–2012), Ukrainian social and political activist in emigration, who served as the last President of the Ukrainian People's Republic in exile
- Mykola Polyakov, Ukrainian scientist and rector of Dnipropetovsk National University
- Mykola Popovych (born 1971), Ukrainian cross-country skier
- Mykola Porsh, political and civil activist of Ukraine, economist, member of the Russian Constituent Assembly
- Mykola Prostorov (born 1994), Ukrainian male trampoline gymnast and member of the national team
- Mykola Prystay (born 1954), retired Soviet football player and current Ukrainian coach
- Mykola Prysyazhnyuk (born 1960), the former Minister of Agrarian Policy and Food of Ukraine
- Mykola Puzderko (born 1990), Ukrainian freestyle skier, specializing in aerials
- Mykola Pymonenko (1862–1912), Ukrainian painter
- Mykola Redkin (born 1928), Ukrainian athlete
- Mykola Riabchuk (born 1953), Ukrainian public intellectual, journalist, political analyst, literary critic, translator and writer
- Mykola Riabovil (1883–1919), Ukrainian political figure in the Kuban
- Mykola Rohozhynskyy, self-nominated candidate in the 2004 Ukrainian presidential election
- Mykola Rudenko (1920–2004), Ukrainian poet, writer, philosopher, Soviet dissident, human rights activist, founder of the Ukrainian Helsinki Group
- Mykola Savolaynen (born 1980), Ukrainian triple jumper
- Mykola Selivon, Ukrainian jurist, judge, diplomat and former chairman of the Constitutional Court of Ukraine
- Mykola Semena (born 1950), Ukrainian journalist who worked for Radio Free Europe/Radio Liberty,
- Mykola Shaparenko (born 1998), Ukrainian professional football midfielder
- Mykola Shapoval (1886–1948), military, public and political figure, Major General of the Ukrainian People's Army
- Mykola Shevchenko, former Ukrainian football player, former head coach of Indian I-League side Churchill Brothers
- Mykola Shmatko (1943–2020), contemporary Ukrainian sculptor and painter
- Mykola Shytyuk (1953–2018), Ukrainian academician, historian, doctor of historical sciences
- Mykola Simkaylo (1952–2013), eparch of the Ukrainian Catholic Eparchy of Kolomyia – Chernivtsi in Ukraine since 2 June 2005 until his death
- Mykola Skorodynskyi (1751–1805), Ukrainian Greek Catholic hierarch
- Mykola Skoryk (born 1972), Ukrainian politician who was Chairman of the Odesa Regional State Administration
- Mykola Skriabin (born 1978), Ukrainian alpine skier
- Mykola Skrypnyk (1872–1933), Ukrainian Communist leader, proponent of the Ukrainian Republic's independence
- Mykola Soroka (1952–2024), Ukrainian mechanical engineer and politician
- Mykola Stakhovsky (1879–1948), Ukrainian diplomat, politician, medic
- Mykola Stasyuk, Ukrainian political and public figure
- Mykola Storozhenko (painter) (1928–2015), Ukrainian painter
- Mykola Stsiborskyi (1897–1941), Ukrainian nationalist politician, chief theorist of the central leadership council of the Organization of Ukrainian Nationalists
- Mykola Suk (born 1945), Ukrainian American pianist and Merited Artist of Ukraine
- Mykola Sumtsov (1854–1922), Ukrainian ethnographer, folklorist, art historian, literary scholar, educator and museum expert
- Mykola Syniuk (born 1988), Ukrainian paracanoeist
- Mykola Szczerbak (1927–1998), Ukrainian zoologist and ecologist, a prolific herpetologist, a full professor and a Corresponding Member of the National Academy of Sciences of Ukraine
- Mykola Tabola (1952–2025), Ukrainian oncologist
- Mykola Temniuk (born 1992), Ukrainian footballer
- Mykola Tomenko (born 1964), Ukrainian politician
- Mykola Tomyn (born 1948), former Soviet/Ukrainian handball player who competed in the 1976 and 1980 Summer Olympics
- Mykola Tsybulenko (1942–1998), Ukrainian major general
- Mykola Tsygan (born 1984), Ukrainian football goalkeeper
- Mykola Vasylenko (1866–1935), Ukrainian academician historian and law professor
- Mykola Vechurko (born 1992), professional Ukrainian football midfielder
- Mykola Velychkivsky (1889–1976), economist, professor, Ukrainian politician and statesman, chairman of the Ukrainian National Council
- Mykola Vilinsky (1888–1956), Ukrainian composer, professor at the Odesa and Kyiv Conservatories
- Mykola Volosyanko (1972–2012), Ukrainian professional footballer and assistant manager
- Mykola Voronyi (1871–1938), Ukrainian writer, poet, actor, director, and political activist
- Mykola Vynnychenko (born 1958), former Soviet Ukrainian race walker
- Mykola Yankovsky (born 1944), former Ukrainian businessman who has influenced Ukraine's chemical production landscape and made it environmentally friendly
- Mykola Yunakiv (1871–1931), Ukrainian general, military pedagogue
- Mykola Yurchenko (born 1966), Soviet and Ukrainian professional footballer
- Mykola Zaichenkov, Ukrainian sprint canoeist
- Mykola Zaludyak (1941–2010), Ukrainian politician and the first secretary (mayor) of Kremenchuk city committee of Communist Party of Ukraine
- Mykola Zerov (1890–1937), Ukrainian poet, translator, classical and literary scholar and critic
- Mykola Zhabnyak (born 1979), Paralympian athlete from Ukraine competing mainly in category F37/38 throwing events
- Mykola Zhovtyuk (born 1992), professional Ukrainian football defender
- Mykola Zlochevsky (born 1966), Ukrainian oil and natural gas businessman, politician and a Ukrainian oligarch

== See also ==
- Mykolas
- Makola (disambiguation)
- Mycula
- Mikkola (disambiguation)
- Mäeküla (disambiguation)
