= Krushelnytskyi =

Krushelnytskyi or Krushelnytsky (Ukrainian: Крушельницький) is a Ukrainian masculine surname, its feminine counterpart is Krushelnytska. The Polish variant of this surname is Kruszelnicki (masculine) or Kruszelnicka (feminine). It may refer to:

- Amvrosii Krushelnytskyi (1841–?), Ukrainian Greek Catholic priest, public figure, choral conductor; the father of Solomiya, Hanna, Anton, Emiliya, Osypa:
  - Anton Krushelnytskyi (1866–95), Ukrainian singer (bass), conductor, collector of folklore
  - Solomiya Krushelnytska (1872–1952), Ukrainian soprano, considered to be one of the brightest opera stars of the first half of the 20th century
  - Emiliya Krushelnytska (1875–1965), Ukrainian folklorist, singer and conductor
  - Hanna Krushelnytska (born 1887–1965), Ukrainian opera singer (soprano)
- Antin Krushelnytskyi (1878–1937), Ukrainian writer and literary critic
- Marian Krushelnytsky (1897–1963), Ukrainian actor and theater director
- Ivan Krushelnytsky (1905–1934), Ukrainian poet, graphic artist, and art critic, son of Antin Krushelnytskyi
- Larysa Krushelnytska (1928–2017), Ukrainian archaeologist
- Mike Krushelnyski (born 1960), Canadian hockey player

== See also ==
- Krushelnitskiy
