= Krushelnitskiy =

Krushelnitskiy, Krushelnitski or Krushelnitsky (/ˌkrʊʃəlˈnɪtski/ KRUUSH-əl-NIT-skee; Russian: Крушельницкий) is a Polish and Russian masculine surname, its feminine counterpart is Krushelnitskaya, Krushelnitskaia. The Polish variant of this surname is Kruszelnicki (masculine) or Kruszelnicka (feminine). It may refer to:

- Alexander Krushelnitskiy (born 1992), Russian curler
- Hanna Krushelnytska (1887–1965), Ukrainian soprano singer
- Karl Kruszelnicki, Australian science communicator and populariser
- Larysa Krushelnytska, Ukrainian archaeologist and librarian
- Maria Krushelnytska (1934–2025), Ukrainian pianist
- Solomiya Krushelnytska (1872–1952), Ukrainian soprano singer
- Tadeusz Kruszelnicki (born 1955), Polish wheelchair tennis player
- Yaroslav Krushelnitskiy (born 1983), Uzbekistani football defender

== See also ==
- Krushelnytskyi
