= Karpuk =

Karpuk is a surname, which could refer to:

- Ilya Karpuk (born in 1997), Russian football player
- Mykola Karpuk (born in 1982), Ukrainian bodybuilder and personal trainer
- Pete Karpuk (c. 1927 – 1985), Canadian football player.
