= Mikkola =

Mikkola is a Finnish language name that can occur both as a surname and as a toponym. It may refer to:

== Surname ==
- Mikkola (surname)

== Places ==
- Mikkola, Ontario, Canada
- Mikkola, Vantaa, Finland
- Mikkola, Pori, Finland

== See also ==
- Luolajan-Mikkola
