= Halyna Levytska =

Ukrainian piano performer and music teacher

- Галина Левицька
- Born: Галина Львiвна Левицька; Halyna Lvivna Levytska; 23 January 1901; Pruchnik, Galicia, Austria-Hungary
- Died: 13 July 1949 (aged 48); Lviv, Ukrainian SSR, USSR
- Other names: Галина Левицька-Крушельницька; Halyna Levytska-Krushelnytska
- Spouse: Ivan Krushelnytskyi (died 1934)
- Children: Larysa Krushelnytska
- Relatives: Antin Krushelnytskyi (father-in-law); Maria Krushelnytska (niece)
- Musical career
- Education: University of Music and Performing Arts Vienna, 1920
- Occupation: Professor
- Instrument: Piano
- Writing career
- Pen name: Оксана Пʼятигорська; Olena Piatyhorska

Halyna Lvivna Levytska (married name Halyna Levytska-Krushelnytska; Ukrainian: Галина Львiвна Левицька, 23 January 1901 – 13 July 1949), also known by the nom-de-plume Olena Piatyhorska (Ukrainian: Оксана Пʼятигорська), was a Ukrainian and Soviet pianist and professor. Levytska was a professor of Lviv Conservatory and the first director of the musical school associated with the conservatory.

== Biography ==
Levytska was born in Pruchnik, Austria-Hungary (currently Poland), in a Ukrainian family. Her father, Lev Levytskyi, was a lawyer. She first learned piano from her mother, an amateur piano player, continued in a girls boarding school in Przemyśl, and in 1920 she graduated from Vienna Academy of Music and Performing Arts. After that, she was giving concerts, mainly in Eastern Europe, in particular, performing pieces of Ukrainian composers.

Since 1926, Levytska was teaching at Mykola Lysenko Music Institute, and, between 1926 and 1932, in the Stryi branch of the institute. In 1932, her husband and his family, including their daughter, left for the Soviet Union where they thought new opportunities for national cultural revival were opening up. Levytska was ill and stayed behind in Lviv. In 1934, her husband was arrested and subsequently executed. She managed, with the help of the Red Cross, to get the daughter back to Lviv.

In August 1939, Levytska was invited to visit the Sydney Conservatorium of Music. She had to postpone the trip due to illness and never made it to Sydney, since World War II started.

After the Soviet annexation of Eastern Galicia and Volhynia in 1939 Levytska was appointed a professor at Lviv National Music Academy, which was founded by merging of several institutions including the Lysenko Institute, and in 1940 she helped organize a musical school associated with the conservatory and was appointed the director of the school. After the war, Levytska continued to give concerts in Lviv, solo as well as together with her sisters, Mariia (cello) and Stefaniia (violin). She died in 1949 in Lviv. The house where she lived now features a memorial plaque.

== Personal life ==
Levytska married the poet and artist Ivan Krushelnytskyi. Levytska and Krushelnytskyi had one daughter the historian Larysa Krushelnytska.

Levytska was the maternal grandmother of the physicist and professor Tetyana Krushelnytska (born 1946).
