= Mykolas =

Mykolas is a Lithuanian male given name derived from Michael. People with the name include:

- Mykolas Arlauskas (born 1930), agronomist, professor of biomedicine and signatory of 1990 Act of the Re-Establishment of the State of Lithuania
- Mykolas Biržiška (1882–1962), Lithuanian editor, historian, professor of literature, diplomat & politician; signatory of Act of Independence of Lithuania
- Mykolas Burokevičius (1927–2016), communist political leader in Lithuania
- Mykolas Kęsgaila (died 1451), Lithuanian nobleman, a precursor of the Kęsgailos family
- Mykolas Kęsgaila (died 1476), Lithuanian nobleman from Kęsgailos family
- Mykolas Krupavičius 1885–1970), Lithuanian priest and politician
- Mykolas Natalevičius (born 1985), Lithuanian composer
- Mykolas Ruzgys (1915–1986), Lithuanian basketball player
- Mykolas Sleževičius (born 1882), Lithuanian lawyer, politician, journalist, interpreter, actor and director of noble Lithuanian extraction

== See also ==
- Mikalojus, name derived from Nicholas but often confused with Mykolas
