= Mäeküla =

Mäeküla may refer to several places in Estonia:

- Mäeküla, Hiiu County, village in Hiiumaa Parish, Hiiu County
- Mäeküla, Paide, village in Paide, Järva County
- Mäeküla, Türi Parish, village in Türi Parish, Järva County
- Mäeküla, Lääne County, village in Haapsalu, Lääne County
- Mäeküla, Pärnu County, village in Põhja-Pärnumaa Parish, Pärnu County
- Mäeküla, Saare County, village in Saaremaa Parish, Saare County
- Mäeküla, Tartu County, village in Kambja Parish, Tartu County
- Mäeküla, Valga County, village in Otepää Parish, Valga County
- Mäeküla, Mulgi Parish, village in Mulgi Parish, Viljandi County
- Mäeküla, Põhja-Sakala Parish, village in Põhja-Sakala Parish, Viljandi County
- Mäeküla, Tallinn, subdistrict of Tallinn

== See also ==
- Mäekülä, village in Võru Parish, Võru County, Estonia
