= Olimpik =

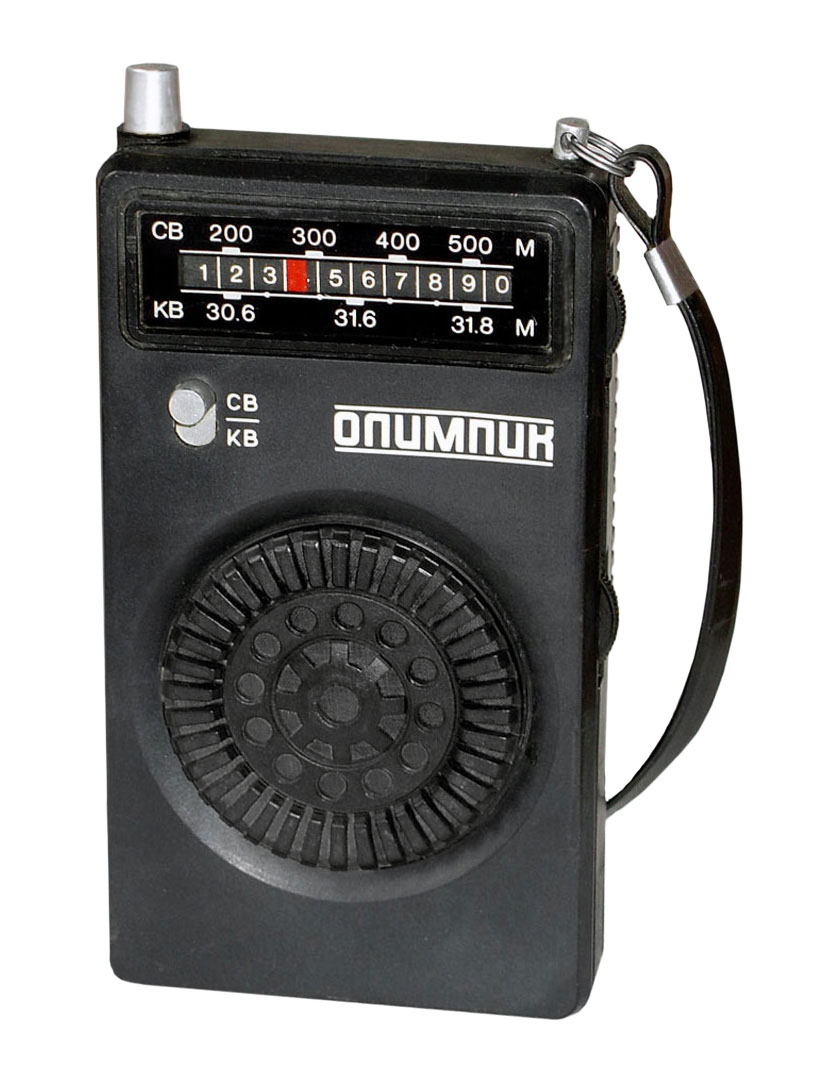
Portable radio Olimpik. The first model, designed by artist Mykola Lebid (1977)

Olimpik (or sometimes named Olympic, in Russian: Олимпик, in Ukrainian: Олімпік) — a series of Soviet produced superheterodyne portable radio receiver. The first model was developed in 1977 by the Ukrainian artist Mykola Lebid. The production was timed to coincide with the 1980 Summer Olympics in Moscow. Radio receivers were made at the Svitlovodsk plant Olymp in Ukraine. Some models were also manufactured by the production association Alatau in Kazakhstan.

== Models ==
Medium frequency band, one or two High frequency bands - depends on model. A concentrated selection filter or piezofilter is used. Audio power amplifier is made on four or five transistors. Radio receivers have monaural headphone jacks and the speaker is automatically muted. The arrangement of all receivers in the series is vertical. Known models:

=== Olimpik ===
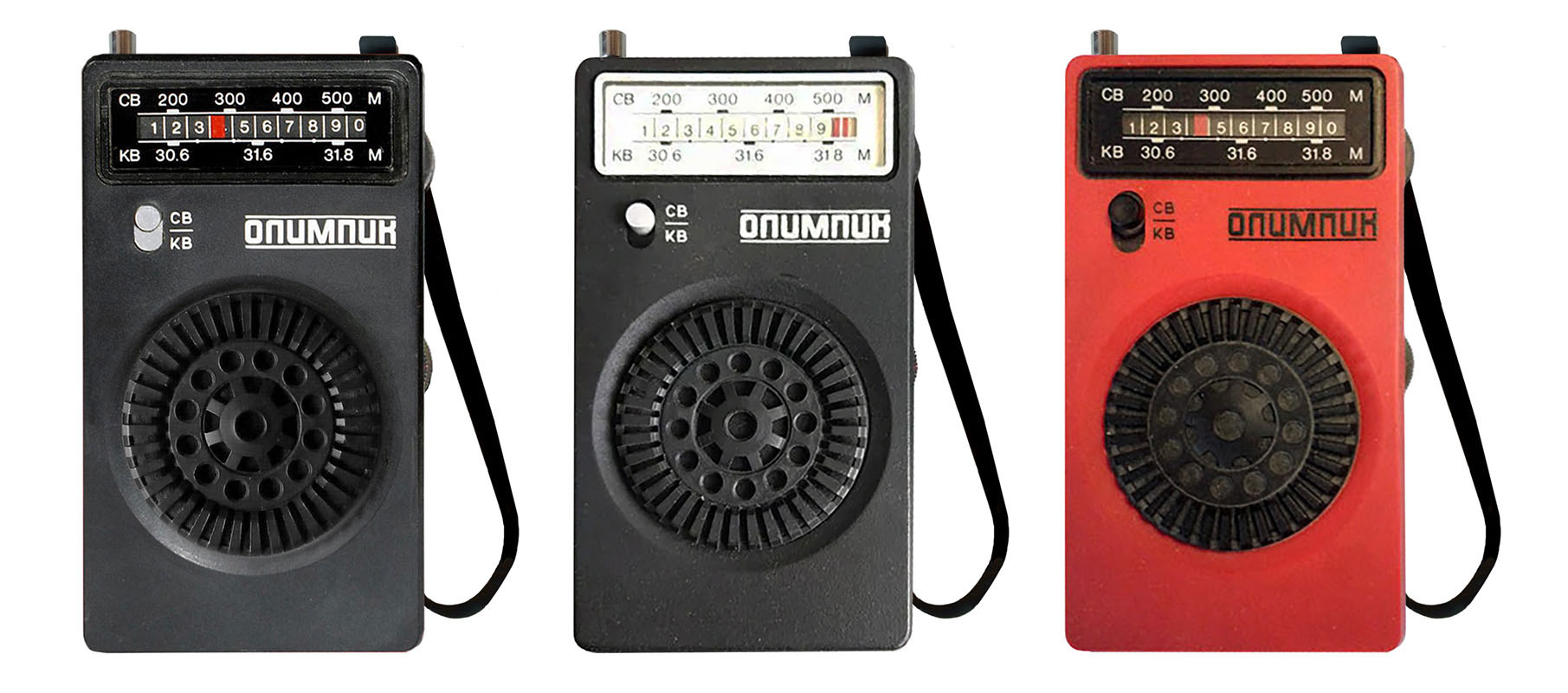
Olimpik

The first model of the series, designed by Mykola Lebid in 1977. The radio has a reliable, user-friendly design and was popular in the USSR. Today receivers are still used by some owners, more than 40 years after the start of production. High frequency band ("KB") 30.6-31.8m, Medium frequency band ("СВ") 186.7-571.4m. An audio frequency power amplifier based on four transistors: КТ315Б (first stage), КТ209Б (second stage), КТ315Б and КТ209Б.

=== Olimpik-401 ===
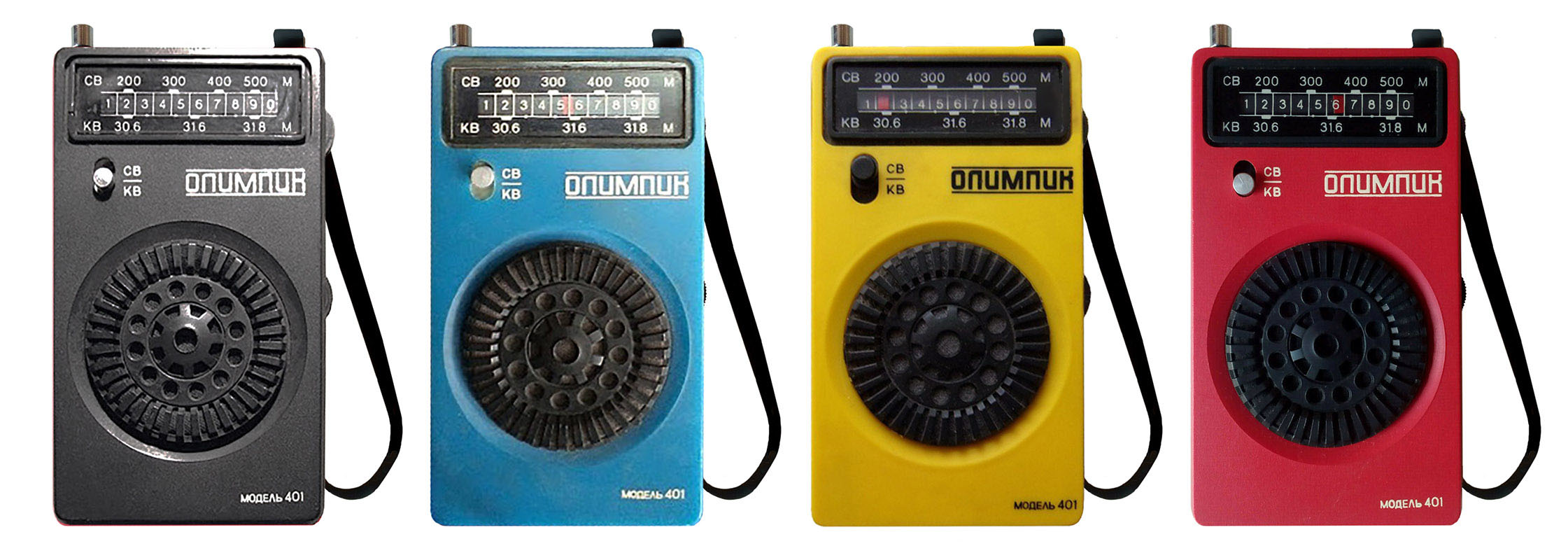
Olimpik-401

Mykola Lebid's original design is practically unchanged, minor variations in the strap fastening, black or silver color of the range switch and antenna attachment, etc. The radio has a reliable, user-friendly design and was popular in the USSR. Today receivers are still used by some owners. High frequency band ("KB") 30.6-31.8m, Medium frequency band ("СВ") 186.7-571.4m.

=== Olimpik-402 ===
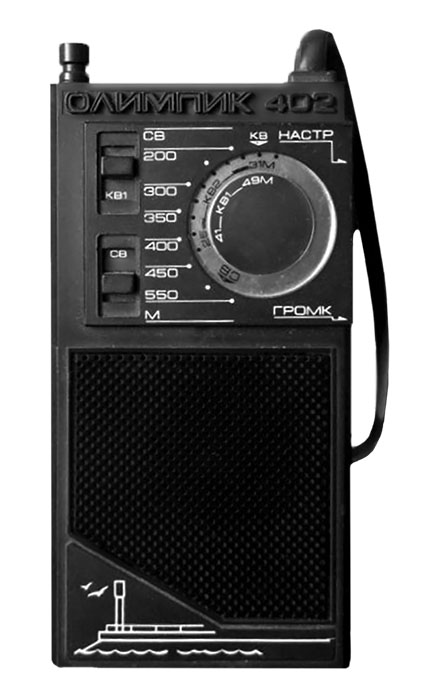
Olimpik-402

Redesigned, two HF bands instead of one. High frequency band 1 ("KB1") 40.5-50.8m, High frequency band 2 ("KB2") 24.8-31.7m, Medium frequency band ("СВ") 186.7-571.4m. Radio receiver was produced in two versions, with audio power amplifier on four or five transistors. The second version of the audio power amplifier uses an additional КТ315Б transistor to stabilize the output stage mode. Known colors - black, white, blue, yellow, green, red, brown, burgundy.

=== Olimpik-305 ===
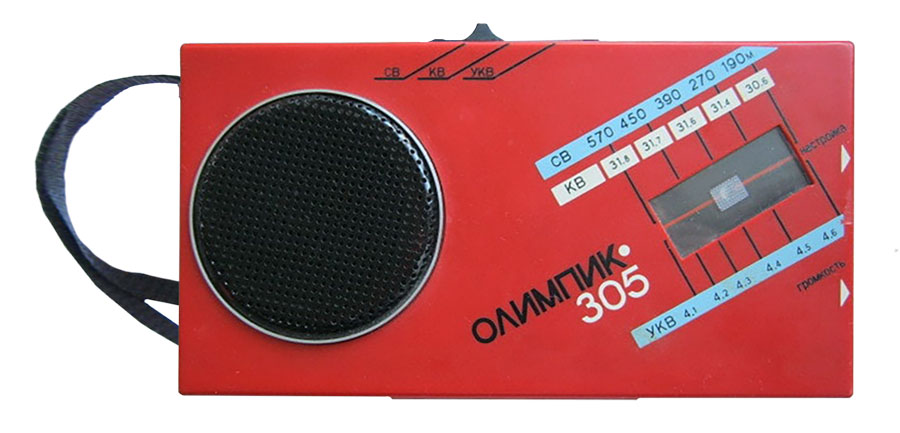
Olimpik-305

Known colors are red, green, etc.

=== Olimpik-2 ===
Another design, modified circuit. A piezofilter is used in the intermediate frequency path. In Audio power amplifier two diodes are used instead of resistors to set the mode of the output stage.

=== Olimpik-403 ===
Radio receiver with LCD clock. Unlike previous models, it only has a Medium frequency band (probably to maintain a reasonable price despite the addition of a clock) and is powered by three 316 elements. Rare model

== See also ==
- List of radios – List of specific models of radios
