= Stefanyk National Scientific Library =

Library in Lviv, Ukraine

Coordinates: 49.836163°N 24.025882°E

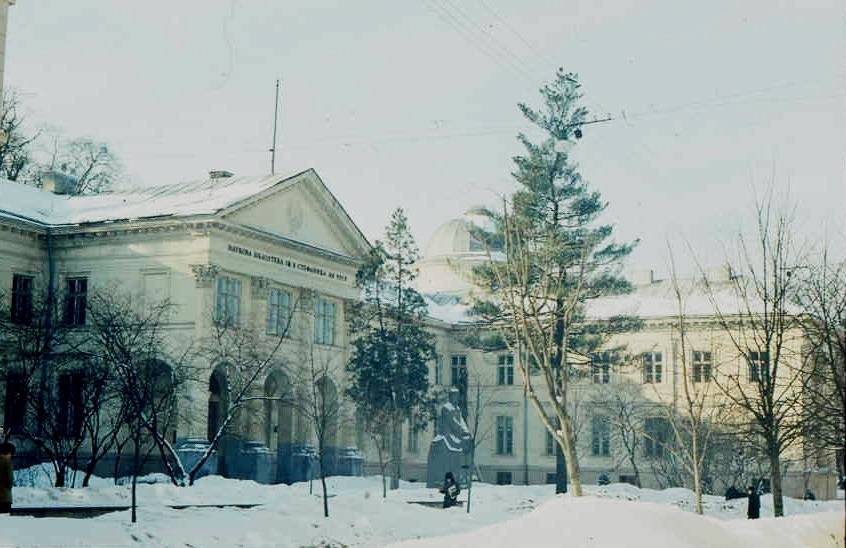
The main edifice of Ossolineum. Winter 1975 in Lviv.

National Scientific Library (Ukrainian: Львівська національна наукова бібліотека України імені Василя Стефаника, romanized: Lvivska natsionalna naukova biblioteka Ukrainy imeni Vasylia Stefanyka) is a national library of Ukraine in the city of Lviv, Ukraine. It also serves as a science and research institute complex of the National Academy of Sciences of Ukraine.

The library formally was established on 2 January 1940 with its headquarters in the building of Ossolineum and composed of holdings of Ossolineum and many other major libraries and private collections, all nationalized after the territory was annexed by the Soviet Union as a result of its invasion of Poland. It was named after Vasyl Stefanyk in 1971.

To the development of the library greatly contributed Ukrainian archaeologist Larysa Krushelnytska who was appointed as its head in October 1991.

== See also ==
- Ossolineum
- List of libraries in Ukraine
