= Mariia Yaremak =

Ukrainian composer (born 1997)

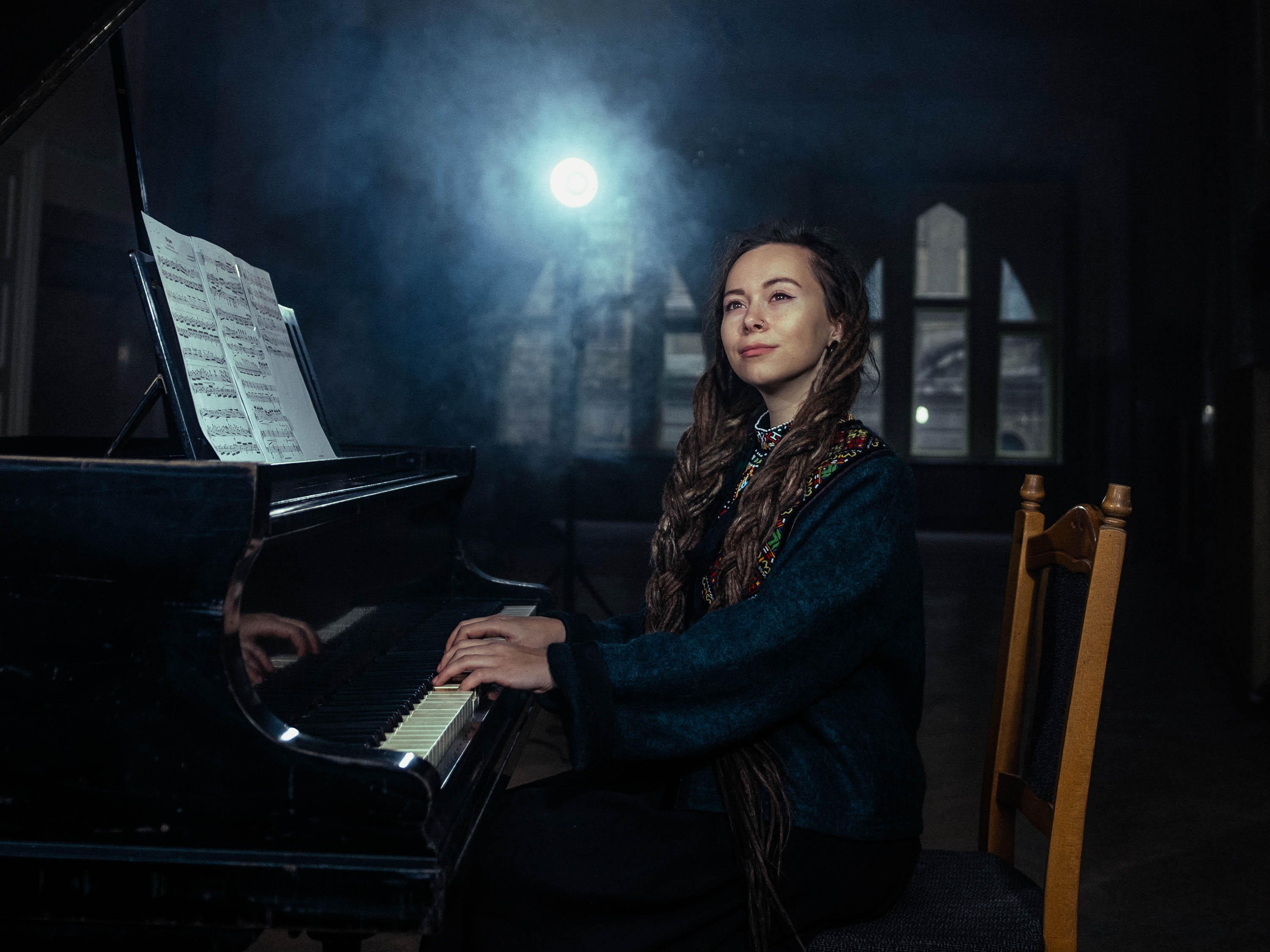
- Born: 7 April 1997 (age 29); Obolonnya, Ivano-Frankivsk State, Ukraine
- Education: Mykola Lysenko Lviv National Music Academy and S. Krushelnytska Lviv State Music Lyceum
- Occupations: composer, pianist, arranger, music editor

Mariia Yaremak (born 7 April 1997, Obolonnya) is a Ukrainian composer, pianist, arranger and music editor. She has taken part in several hundred concerts, international and national projects (including the Eurovision Song Contest), and worked with artists, orchestras and on films in Europe, America, and Ukraine. Since the Russian invasion of Ukraine, she has performed and co-organised more than 40 charity concerts in support of Ukraine in different countries (UK, France, US, Ireland). At her events, she performs original music and arrangements of ancient ethnic Ukrainian melodies in a fantasy style. The works she created for artistic collaborations during the war have received several million views on social media.

== Biography ==
Maria Yaremak graduated from the Solomiya Krushelnytska Lviv State Music Lyceum (2012–2014). Afterwards, she entered the Mykola Lysenko Lviv National Music Academy, where she studied at the piano faculty. Due to inflammation of the muscles in her hands, she decided to transfer to the Faculty of Theory and Composition in the class of Bohdana Frolyak after her first year (2014–2018).

The composer began her professional career by digitizing scores by foreign and Ukrainian composers, including Myroslav Skoryk, in cooperation with the Lviv Philharmonic. In a short time, she was already invited to major orchestral projects such as Cadenza European Art Productions, Lviv Orchestra Fashion, Leopolis Jazz Fest, and Lviv MozArt.

After the beginning of the Russian invasion of Ukraine, the composer lost her main source of musical projects in the country. Later, she received an invitation to go to a recording studio in the UK under the Homes for Ukraine program. To survive, Yaremak had to work in a law firm in the first months to earn money for food and clothing. The composer joined forces with The Voice contestant Isabella Ivashchenko, with whom she shared a studio with a British family. They both created a documentary performance about Ukraine called Sound of Ukraine, which combined people's stories, video footage, original music and visuals to draw attention to the events in Ukraine.

Her more than 20 concerts in the UK ranged from the small village of Tebworth with 50 people to performing at St Albans Cathedral, as well as a special charity event with the British Royal Family—the Duke of Edinburgh, son of Queen Elizabeth II. During this time, Yaremak and Ivashchenko fundraised to support requests from many volunteers in Ukraine, as well as financially support the restoration of houses for families who lost their homes, working with the British charity Rotary Club.

In 2023, Yaremak became one of 15 ambassadors of the British organisation Creative Youth, whose patron and president is the Duke of Edinburgh. In the same year, she won a grant to study at the Eastern European Music Academy.

In June and July 2023, Yaremak worked as a music editor on the score for the new soundtrack to the 1930 silent film Earth by Oleksandr Dovzhenko in collaboration with composer Luke Coraddine. The film premiered on 23 July 2023 at the Academy Museum in Hollywood.

On 7 October 2023, she performed with Grammy-winning musicians on the same stage during the nomination of American composer Kim Scharnberg as a UN Goodwill Ambassador in Connecticut.

In November 2023, Yaremak took second place in the seventh European 3D audio production competition for her composition "If Trees Had a Voice" in the category: audio drama/documentary/soundscapes.

On 24 February 2024, she performed her own compositions and arrangements of ancient Ukrainian fantasy melodies at a charity event dedicated to the second anniversary of the Russian invasion of Ukraine at Bath Abbey.

In 2024, Maria was nominated for the annual award "Women in Arts. The Resistance" by the Ukrainian Institute and UN Women in Ukraine in the category "Women in Music," along with Jamala and Khrystyna Daletska.

== Career ==
=== Orchestral arrangements ===
During 2018–2023, Yaremak collaborated with the Dutch music agency Cadenza European Art Productions. As part of this collaboration, she created scores for a symphony orchestra, working with a choir, and acting as a music score editor. All projects were implemented as part of a tour of cities in the Netherlands. In total, more than 60 events have taken place, some of which she also joined as a pianist.

On 8 September 2021, Lviv Fashion Orchestra held an experimental music and fashion show of designer Marta Wachholz's new collection in Lviv, where the composer worked on creating music, composing orchestral scores together with Mariia Oliinyk, Uliana Horbachevska and Mykhailo Baloh, performed by the INSO-Lviv Symphony Orchestra.

She is working on the musical scores for the opera-myth "Ukraine – Terra Incognita", which combines singing of ancient Ukrainian songs, symphony music, free jazz, and video art. The work is still in progress.

Yaremak is the co-arranger of the song "Lullaby" by Maryna Krut for the Eurovision Song Contest 2022 and the author of the orchestral version of her composition "Tell Me, God."

She created orchestral scores for the Ukrainian National Anthem for a large charity concert on 30 March 2022 with Ukrainian singer Tina Karol and the INSO-Lviv orchestra at the ROMA Music Theatre in Warsaw.

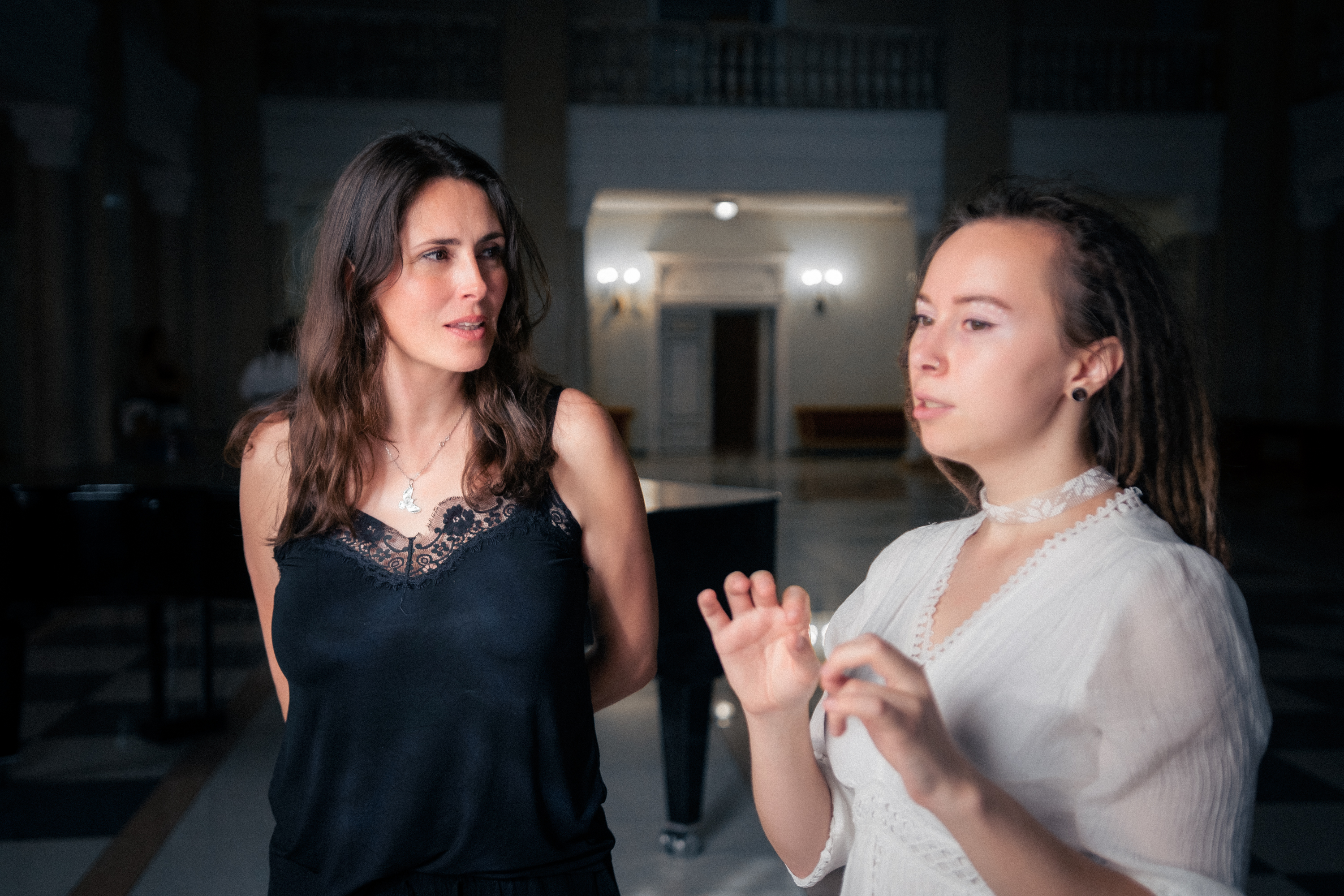
Sharon and Mariia in Kyiv, 2024

In 2024, Mariia created arrangements for the concert show of Within Temptation vocalist Sharon den Adel at the Atlas United festival. She participated as a composer and pianist, collaborating with the LUMOS Orchestra and the "Yevshan" choir.

In October and November 2024, Mariia Yaremak created orchestral arrangements for the MUZVAR AWARDS, which took place on December 2. She collaborated with leading Ukrainian artists, including Alyona Alyona, to produce new versions of their compositions. A significant moment for Mariia was the orchestral arrangement of the final note of Alyona Alyona’s track "Tato," which symbolized the culmination of her work on the project.

Despite challenging rehearsal conditions caused by power outages and airstrikes, the project was successfully brought to life. Mariia described the awards as both a challenge and an opportunity to create something unique, uniting music and the efforts of many people during wartime.

=== Performance with "Shchedryk" in London ===
In December 2024, Mariia Yaremak took part in a special Christmas program Ukrainian Carol of Hope organised by Campaign for Ukraine. The event was held at St. Pancras Station in London, where Ukrainian melodies arranged by Mariia ("Shchedryk," "Podolyanochka," "Ivanku," "Kotyku Sirenkyi," "Oy u Vyshnevomu Sadu") and her original compositions were performed on Elton John's iconic piano.

British actress Kristine Millward performed poems by Viktoria Amelina and Maksym Kryvtsov to the accompaniment of Mariia's music. The event's honorary guest, actor and writer Stephen Fry, also performed during the program.

‘Together We Stand’ event at Bath Abbey

In February 2025, Mariia Yaremak was one of the featured composers and performers at Together We Stand, a series of fundraising concerts in Bath, UK, supporting the people of Ukraine. The events brought together a diverse range of musicians, including members of the Bath Philharmonia and local Ukrainian artists, for a programme blending classical repertoire and contemporary Ukrainian compositions.

=== Music for films, commercials and performances ===
Yaremak creates compositions for a wide range of projects. Her works can be heard in commercials, news, theatre performances, and films, including:

- 5 documentaries about Dmytro Bortnyansky – "The Unknown Bortnyansky" (directed by Roman Dzundza)
- "Kyrylo Stetsenko. The Mercy of the World" (directed by Roman Dzundza)
- Short video poem "Roots" (dir. Oleksandra Komisarova)
- "The 13th Bus" (dir. Oleksandr Bezruchko) in cooperation with OLI Music (with the support of the Ukrainian State Film Agency)
- The play De Forma (dir. Mariia Bakalo)
- Short animated film "Stewart The Cat" (US)
- Sound engineer for the short film "Stain" (dir. Nataliia Shynkarenko)
- Music for the advertising company "Young and Hungry Production"

=== Artistic collaborations and author's projects ===
Yaremak is the founder of such projects as "Musical Video Portraits," which conveys a portrait of a person through visuals and the language of sounds, and "How the World Sounds," a project about creating compositions based on reflections on life moments, describing locations and landscapes with music using live sounds recorded in those places and woven into melody and video.

In addition, in collaboration with the choreographer Mariia Bakalo, eight audio lessons of 45 minutes each were recorded as part of the contemporary dance project "Listen with Your Body."
