= Solomiya Krushelnytska Lviv Secondary Specialized Music Boarding School =

- Львівська середня спеціалізована музична школа-інтернат імені Соломії Крушельницької

Location
- Lviv; Ukraine; 49°50′1″N 24°2′11″E

Information
- School type: Boarding school
- Established: 1939
- Director: Lev Myronovych Zakopets
- Language: Ukrainian
- Website: https://solomiya-lc.lviv.ua

Solomiya Krushelnytska Lviv Secondary Specialized Music Boarding School (Ukrainian: Львівська середня спеціалізована музична школа-інтернат імені Соломії Крушельницької, romanized: L'vivs'ka serednya spetsializovana muzychna shkola-internat imeni Solomiyi Krushel'nits'koyi) is an educational institution in Ukraine, where students from receive specialized musical and secondary education. The school is named after the soprano Solomiya Krushelnytska.

== History ==
Solomiya Krushelnytska Lviv Secondary Specialized Music Boarding School is a specialist music school in Lviv. The school was founded in 1939 on the initiative of the Ukrainian composer and pianist Vasyl Barvinsky. Prior to that it was known as the Empress Elisabeth School and its origins date from the eighteenth century. From 1944 it operated as a high school for music students; from 1959 it was reorganized into a specialized music boarding school. In 1963 the school was named after Solomiya Krushelnytska. Halyna Levytska was the first director of the school. From 1972 to 1997, the director was Volodymyr Antoniv. In 1997 B. Martynovsky was appointed director, followed by D. Komonko in 2004. Since 2009, Lev Myronovych Zakopets has been the director.

== Education ==
The school has seven music departments and more than 20 music specialties. Lessons are formed by general education, music-theoretical and specialized cycles. Students also study other musical disciplines, including: solfeggio, music theory, harmony, music literature. The school teaches in Ukrainian. Students also learn foreign languages: English, French, German. The school has the additional resources of two concert halls, the museum of Solomiya Krushelnytska, a library with a rich book and music collection. The style of teaching in the school and the importance of music in child development has been studied by Leo Zakopets. Students from the school are known for their success in national and international musical competitions.

== Notable alumni ==
Notable alumni include:

- Daryna Bachynska (uk) – flautist.
- Engelina Buriakovskaja (uk) – pianist.
- Olena Haviuk-Sheremet (uk) – pianist.
- Eva Rabchevska (uk) – violinist.
- Vasyl Zatsikha (uk) – violinist.
- Ustym Zhuk (uk) – violinist.
- Mariia Yaremak - composer
