= Mikalojus =

- Gender: Male
- Language: Lithuanian
- Name day: 10 September, 6 December

Origin
- Region of origin: Lithuania

Mikalojus is a Lithuanian masculine given name derived from Greek Νικόλαος (Nikolaos). It is a cognate of English-language name Nicholas. People bearing the name include:

- Mikalojus Akelaitis (1828–1887), Lithuanian writer, publicist and linguist
- Mikalojus Konstantinas Čiurlionis (1875–1911), Lithuanian painter, composer and writer
- Mikalojus Daukša (c. 1527–1613), Lithuanian religious writer, translator and Catholic church official
- Mikalojus I Radvila (c. 1450–1509), Lithuanian nobleman
- Mikalojus II Radvila (1470–1521), Lithuanian nobleman
- Mikalojus Radvila Juodasis (1515–1565), Lithuanian nobleman
