= Mykola Marchenko =

Mykola Marchenko (20 Sep 1943) – sculptor, a representative of realism in Ukrainian art of the 20th – 21st centuries. He works in the area of monumental sculpture, small plastic, relief, bas-relief bas-relief. A special place in the creation of Marchenko takes Portrait. He gravitates towards ideological and artistic, deeply psychological interpretation of images.

He is a member of state exhibitions and art projects. In particular, he was a member of creative team which worked on the implementation of the project Independence Monument, Kyiv city in 2000.

He is the author of monuments and memorial plaques set in Kyiv and other cities of Ukraine: relief portrait "P.P. Virskyi" (1983 Kyiv city); bas-relief "For graduates of the Kyiv special schools – participants of the Second World War" (1979 Kyiv city) and others.

Mykola Marchenko's works are in private collections of Ukraine, France and other Europe as well as in museum collections: of the National Museum of Literature of Ukraine; Ministry of Education and Science of Ukraine, Youth and Sports of Ukraine; Kyiv Palace of Children and Youth; Teacher's House; State museum – memorial complex "Bukryn Bridgehead" etc.

Lives and works in Kyiv.

He was born on 20 September 1943 in village of Kharkovo, Chernihiv region. During 1960 – 1968 he was studying in Dnipropetrovsk State Art School under specialty "Sculpture". In 1970 – 1976 was getting the higher art education at the Kyiv State Art Institute (now – National Academy of Visual Arts and Architecture) under specialty "Sculpture". In 1978 he became a member of the National Union of Artists of Ukraine. He starts his teaching activity: since 1979 till present time – in the Kyiv State Construction-Engineering Institute (now – Kyiv National University of Construction and Architecture) some time he works at the Borys Grinchenko Kyiv University. Since 2009 – he is an assistant professor of Drawing and Painting Subdepartment of Kyiv National University of Construction and Architecture.

== Notes ==
- Довідник Національної спілки художників України. К. — 2005;
- Україна. No. 8. лютий, 1988. ISSN 0130-5212;
- Киев. Энциклопедический справочник / Под ред. Кудрицкого. К. – 1985;
- Выставка изобразительного искусства Украинской ССР. Каталог. М. – 1985. С. 12;
- І.Чуліпа. Вишуканість – ще не довершеність// Культура і життя. No. 2, 22 травня 1983;
- Молодість країни. Республіканська виставка творів молодих художників. Каталог. К. – 1977. С. 31;
