= Mykola Nechyporuk =

Ukrainian scientist (1952–2025)

Mykola Vasylovych Nechyporuk (Ukrainian: Микола Васильович Нечипорук; 10 November 1952 – 5 August 2025) was a Ukrainian scientist.

== Life and career ==
Nechyporuk was born on 10 November 1952 in the village of Maleve, Demydiv district, Rivne Oblast. After graduating from the Kharkiv Aviation Institute, he remained and worked at the university, where he served as director of the campus from 1979. He was a member of the Party of Regions and was elected a deputy of the Kharkiv City Council of the 6th convocation (2010–2015).

In 2021 he was awarded the Order of Prince Yaroslav the Wise V degree.

Nechyporuk died on 5 August 2025, at the age of 72.
