= Luolajan-Mikkola =

Luolajan-Mikkola is a compound surname of Finnish origin. Notable people with the name include:

- Vilho Luolajan-Mikkola (1911–2005), Finnish composer of contemporary classical music
- Markku Luolajan-Mikkola, Finnish baroque cellist and viol player

== See also ==
- Mikkola (surname)
