= Makola =

Makola may refer to:

- Makola, Ghana
- Makola, Sri Lanka
