= Mycula =

Scientific classification
- Kingdom: Animalia
- Phylum: Arthropoda
- Subphylum: Chelicerata
- Class: Arachnida
- Order: Araneae
- Infraorder: Araneomorphae
- Family: Linyphiidae
- Genus: Mycula; Schikora, 1994
- Species: M. mossakowskii

Binomial name
- Mycula mossakowskii Schikora, 1994

Genus of spiders

Mycula is a monotypic genus of European dwarf spiders containing the single species, Mycula mossakowskii. It was first described by H.-B. Schikora in 1994, and has only been found in Austria, Germany, and Italy.
