= Mikkola (surname) =

Mikkola is a Finnish surname. Notable people with the surname include:

- Esko Mikkola (born 1975), Finnish javelin thrower
- Hannu Mikkola (1942–2021), retired world champion rally driver
- Heikki Mikkola (born 1945), four time World Champion motocross racer
- Niko Mikkola (born 1996), Finnish ice hockey player
- Seppo Mikkola (born 1947), Finnish astronomer
- Tom Mikkola (born 1979), Finnish musician

== See also ==
- Luolajan-Mikkola
