= Mykola Lebid =

Ukrainian artist (1936–2007)

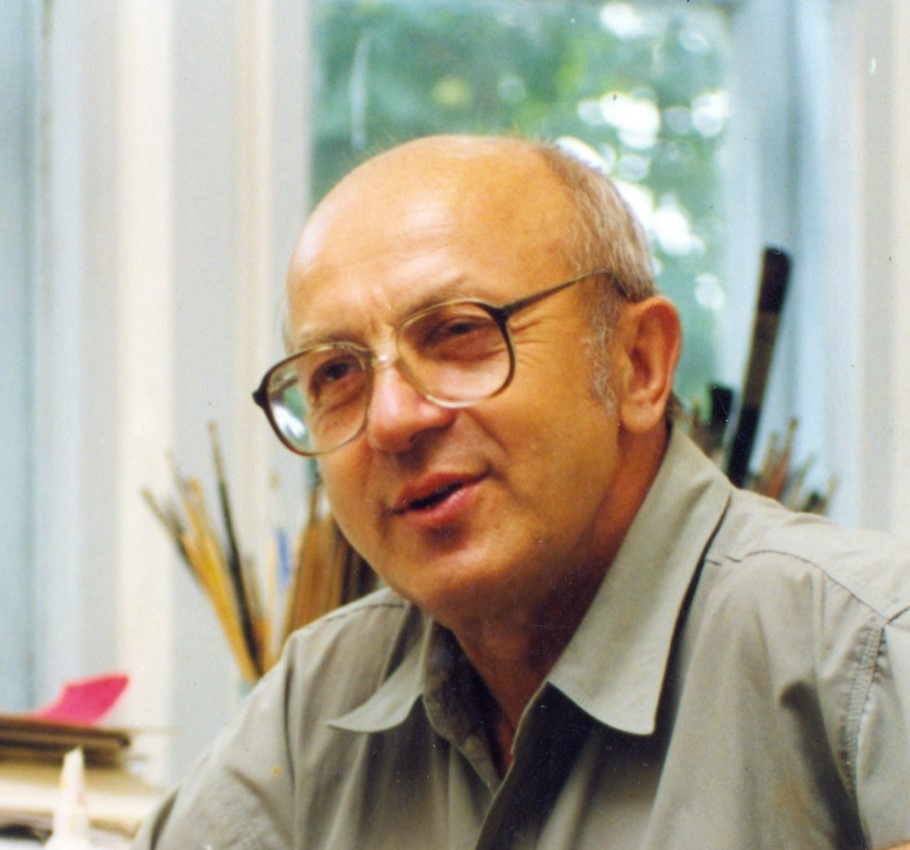
- Born: May 5, 1936 village Kustyne, Sumy region, Ukrainian SSR (now Ukraine)
- Died: 29 March 2007 (aged 70); Kyiv, Ukraine
- Education: Leningrad Higher School of Art and Industry named after V. Mukhina (1963)
- Known for: watercolour paintings, design, graphics, medallic art, heraldry
- Awards: Honored Artist of Ukraine (1992), Mykola Ostrovskyi Prize (1986)

Mykola Yakovych Lebid (Ukrainian: Микола Якович Лебідь, Russian: Николай Яковлевич Лебедь, 5 May 1936 – 29 March 2007) was a Ukrainian painter, graphic artist, designer, Honored Artist of Ukraine, professor. Known for exquisite watercolor paintings, graphics, design, medallic art and award symbols. He was awarded the Mykola Ostrovsky Prize in 1986.

== Biography ==
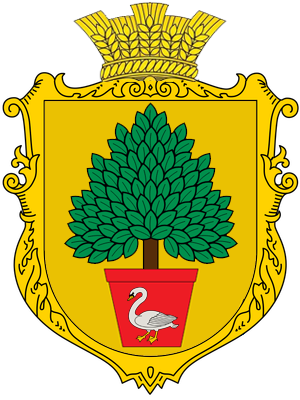
Place, where the artist was born, contains an image of a swan (in Ukrainian - Lebid)

Mykola Lebid was born on May 5, 1936, in the village of Kustyne, Sumy region, Ukrainian SSR (now Ukraine). His father, Yakiv Stepanovych Lebid (1896-1947), was a railroad worker, served in the Red Army during World War II, and died of wounds shortly after the war. His mother was Yevdokiya Kyrylivna Lebid (Radchenko) (1898-19??). There were six children in the family. Two older brothers died during the Holodomor of the 1930s. The elder brother, Danylo Lebid, who was faithful to his military oath, went missing in November 1943. Before that, he was awarded two medals "For Courage". After the war, the sisters Halyna, Mariia, and the youngest child Mykola lived with their mother. In the postwar years of 1944-1954, he graduated from Znob-Novgorod High School

In 1957, he passed the exams for the Leningrad Higher School of Art and Industry named after V. Mukhina and defended his diploma with honors in 1963. He was taught by Serhii Osypov, Modest Shepilevskyi, and Mykola Borushko.

He worked as a design artist at the Ukrdipromebli Institute and the Institute of Technical Aesthetics in Kyiv (1964-1967). Нe was the chief artist of Ukrtorgreklama (1966-1973). Since 1967, he has been a member of the National Union of Artists of Ukraine (NUAU). In 1992, Lebid was awarded the distinguished title of Honored Artist of Ukraine. In 1999, the Kyiv organization of the NUAU nominated him for the honorary title of People's Artist of Ukraine.

In the last years of his life, Mykola Lebid passed on his skills to students of the Institute of Interior Design and Landscape (National Academy of Government Managerial Staff of Culture and Arts). He died on March 29, 2007, in Kyiv, surrounded by his wife, children and grandchildren.

== Works of Art ==
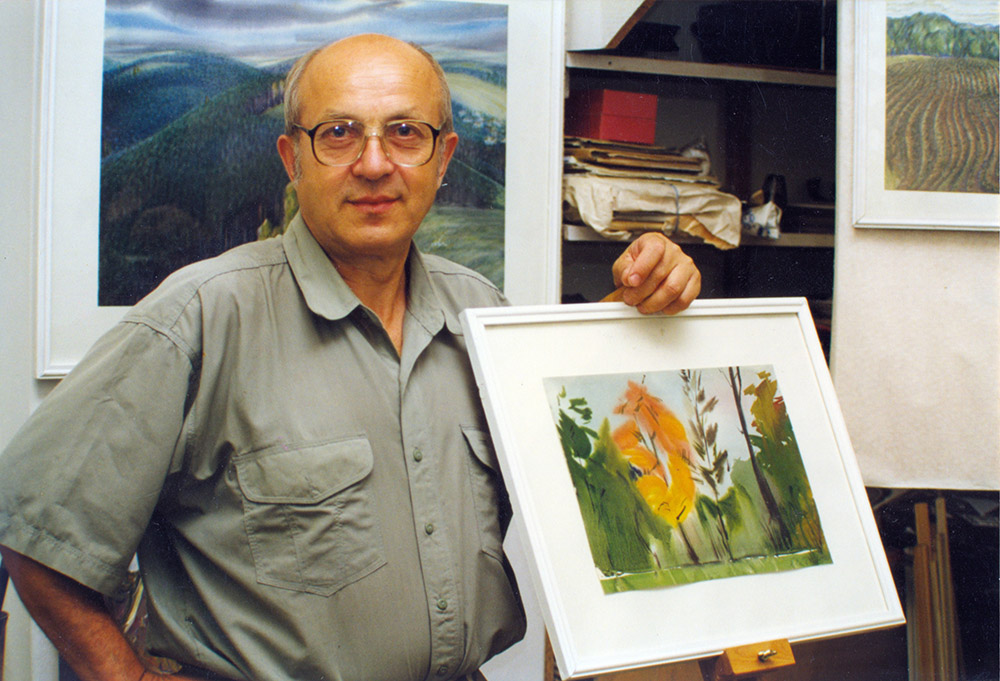
Mykola Lebid in his studio (1998)

Mykola Lebid's watercolor paintings are among the best created in this technique by contemporary artists. Are written alla prima, extremely transparent, passionate and at the same time are in logical design, rhythm and composition. Both in painting and in design Mykola Lebid does not copy the objects of nature, but expresses the regularities by all means available. Mykola Lebid's watercolors have been exhibited at numerous solo and group exhibitions. The artist's paintings are held in private collections in Ukraine, the USA, Great Britain, Poland, the Czech Republic, Slovakia, Canada, Germany, the UAE, Austria, Belgium, the Netherlands, Russia, and other countries

The artist is the author of the Khreshchatyk festive street lighting in 1967-1977. He designed and supervised the industrial production of a series of lamps for public institutions; musical instruments for Chernihiv and Zhytomyr musical factories (in particular, the famous piano "Ukraine"); children's wooden toys and souvenirs produced in the 1960s and 1970s at the Chernihiv and Kyiv factories. Mykola Lebid is the author of the artistic and design of the "Olimpik" and "Olimpik-401" radio receivers (1977).

Mykola Lebid designed gold and silver cutlery, gift sets made of semi-precious stones (by "Ukrsamotsvity" factory), watches, film scopes, loudspeakers, etc. The products were awarded copyright certificates by the USSR Council of Ministers and were produced by the industry from the 1970s to the 2000s.

Since the 1980s, Mykola Lebid has also been engaged in environmental and landscape design. In particular, he designed the Complex of Ukraine at the 12th World Festival of Youth and Students in Moscow (1985, M. Ostrovsky Prize in 1986), local history museum of Varva (1986-1990), memorial "Defenders of the Motherland" in Borova (1987), the Central Park in the city of Belgorod (Russia, 1988), a restaurant in Dubai (UAE, 1996), etc.

In the field of graphics, in 1980-1983, Mykola Lebid developed the corporate identity of the "Science" sports club of the Academy of Sciences of Ukraine, and later a series of commemorative medals and signs commissioned by the Kyiv radio factory "Slavutych" (1982-1989). The gained experience was useful to him when in 1999 the Verkhovna Rada announced a competition for the creation of state awards of independent Ukraine, where Mykola Lebid became the author of the state award Order "For Courage" and about twenty other departmental awards.

== Selected works ==
- a series of watercolor paintings in own exquisite technique. Рainted throughout his life
- musical instruments for the Chernihiv and Zhytomyr music factories, including the famous piano "Ukraine" (1966–68);
- festive lighting design of Khreshchatyk street (1967–77);
- children's wooden toys (1968–71);
- souvenirs "1500 years of Kyiv", inlaid with straw (1973);
- gold and silver cutlery (1974);
- souvenirs for the "Ukrainian Gems" factory (1975);
- radio receiver "Olimpik", "Olimpik-401" (1977);
- "Stop Test" device (USSR Exhibition of Economic Achievements medal), electronic digital clocks, F-7 film scope, household loudspeakers, portable tourist gas stove (1975-79);
- Social and Cultural Complex of Ukraine in Moscow (1985, co-author, World Festival, diploma, M. Ostrovsky Prize in 1986);
- a memorial "Defenders of the Motherland" (Borova 1987);
- Lenin Park (1987) and Children's playtown (1988; Belgorod, Russian Federation);
- a series of commemorative medals and badges (1982–89);
- design of a restaurant in Dubai (UAE, 1996);
- graphics – "Old Tallinn" (1965), "Flowering Time" (1966), "Rus" (1967), "Begonia" (1980), "Morning in the Mountains" (1983) etc.;

== Author of state awards and departmental honours ==
- Order "For Courage", 3 classes (1995, State Award of Ukraine)
- Badge of Honor of the Ministry of Internal Affairs of Ukraine (1995, Ministry of Internal Affairs)
- Badge "For Distinction in Service" (1995, Ministry of Internal Affairs)
- Badge "The Best Firefighter" (1995, Ministry of Internal Affairs, Ministry of Emergency Situations of Ukraine)
- Badge of Honor of the Security Service of Ukraine (1996, Security Service of Ukraine)
- Badge "Cross of Glory" (1997, Ministry of Internal Affairs)
- Badge "Honorary Border Guard of Ukraine", logo, series of souvenirs (1997, State Border Guard Service)
- Honorary Jubilee Award of the Supreme Arbitration Court of Ukraine (2001, Supreme Arbitration Court of Ukraine)
- Medal "For Courage in Protection of the State Border of Ukraine" (2000, State Border Guard Service)
- Medal "For Meritorious Service" in the Border Guard Service of Ukraine, 4 classes (2002, State Border Guard Service)
- Medal "For Peacekeeping Activity" (2003, Ministry of Internal Affairs, Ministry of Defence)
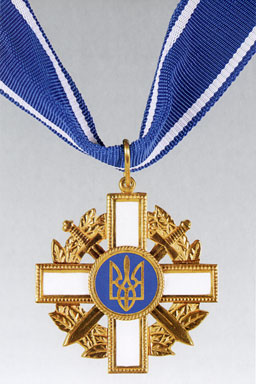
Order "For Courage" 1st class

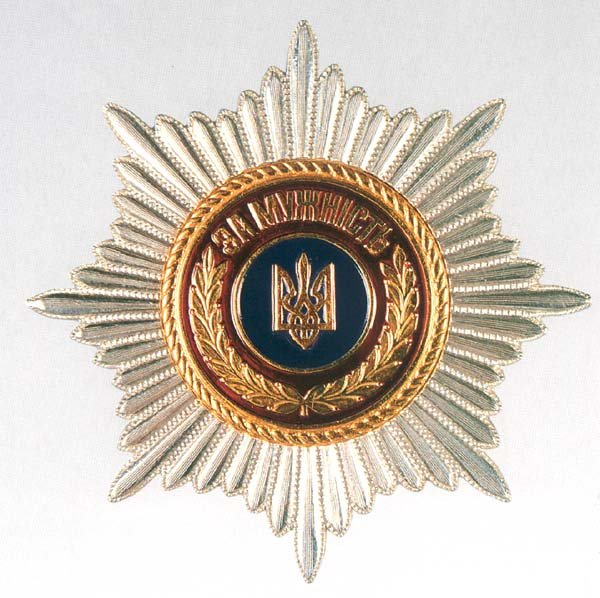
Star of the Order "For Courage", 1st class

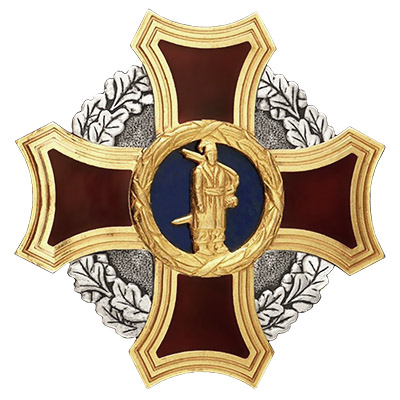
Badge "Cross of Glory"

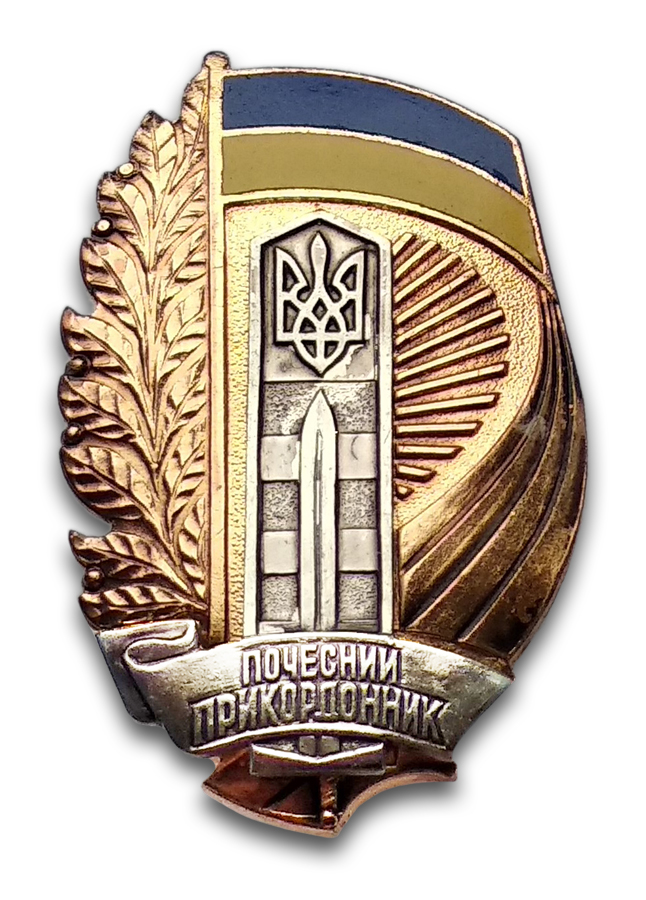
Badge "Honorary Border Guard of Ukraine"

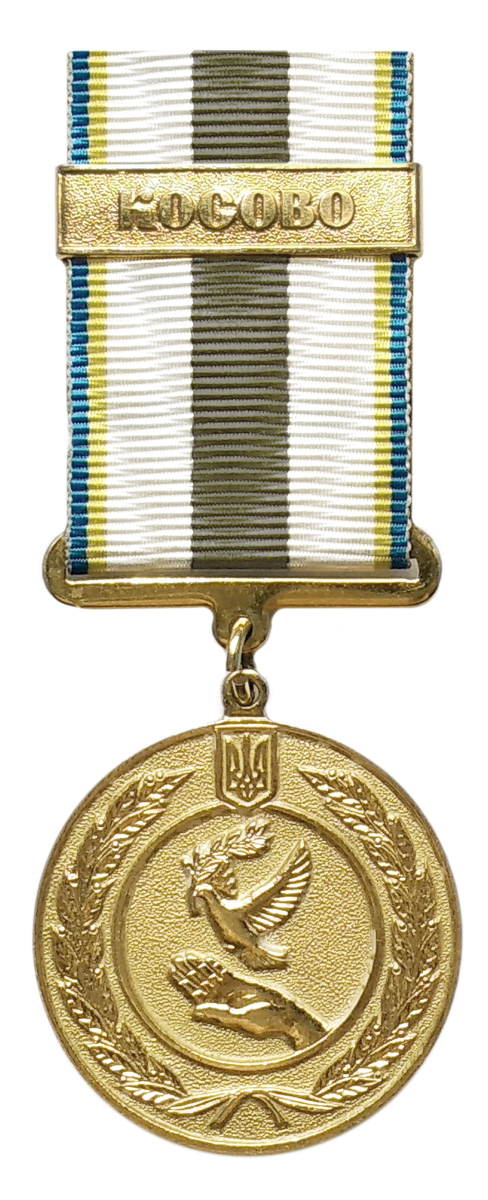
Medal "For Peacekeeping Activity"

== Media ==
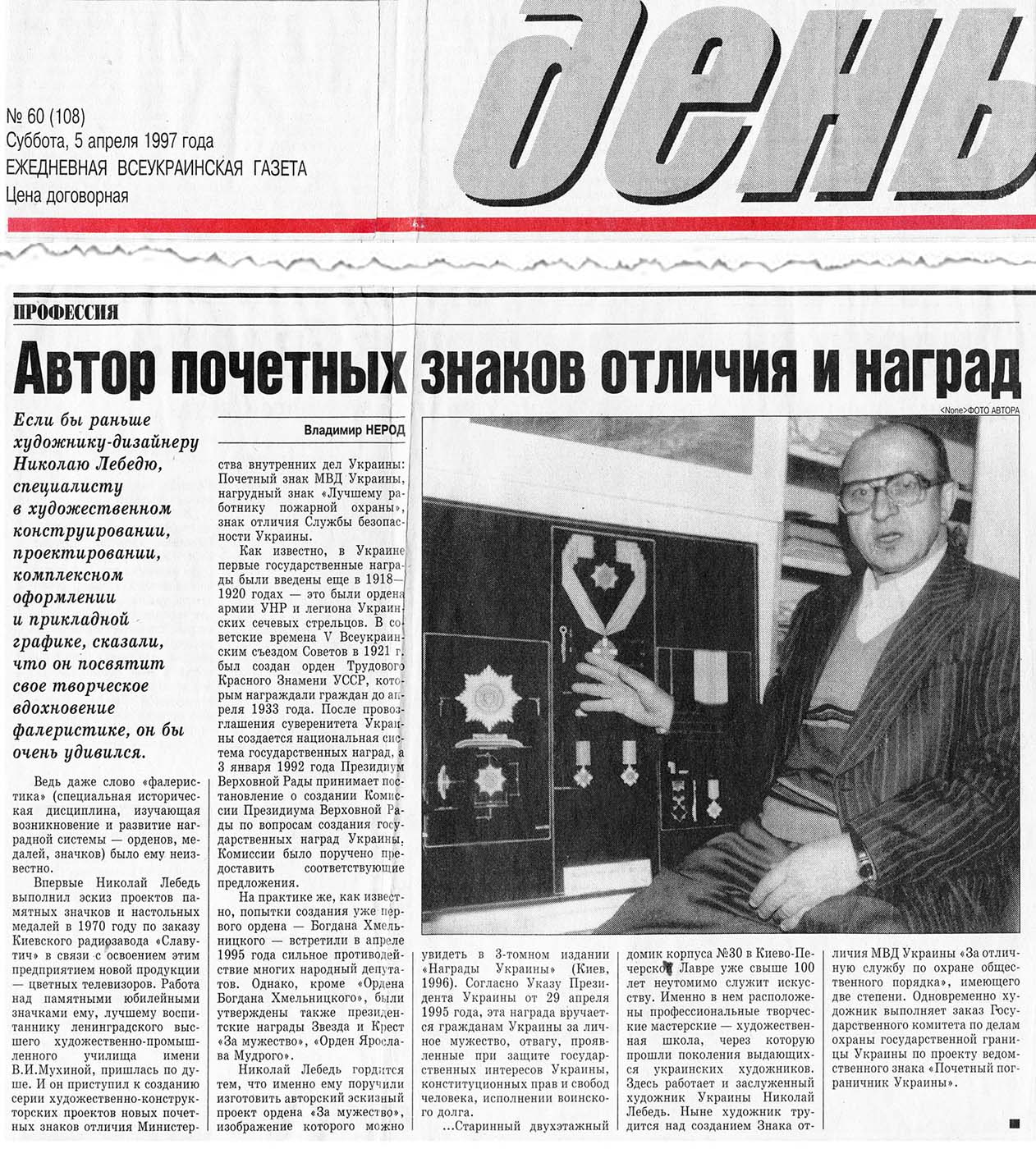
Nerod V. The author of honorary signs and awards. Day, newspaper (April 5, 1997) (rus) (About artist Mykola Lebid)

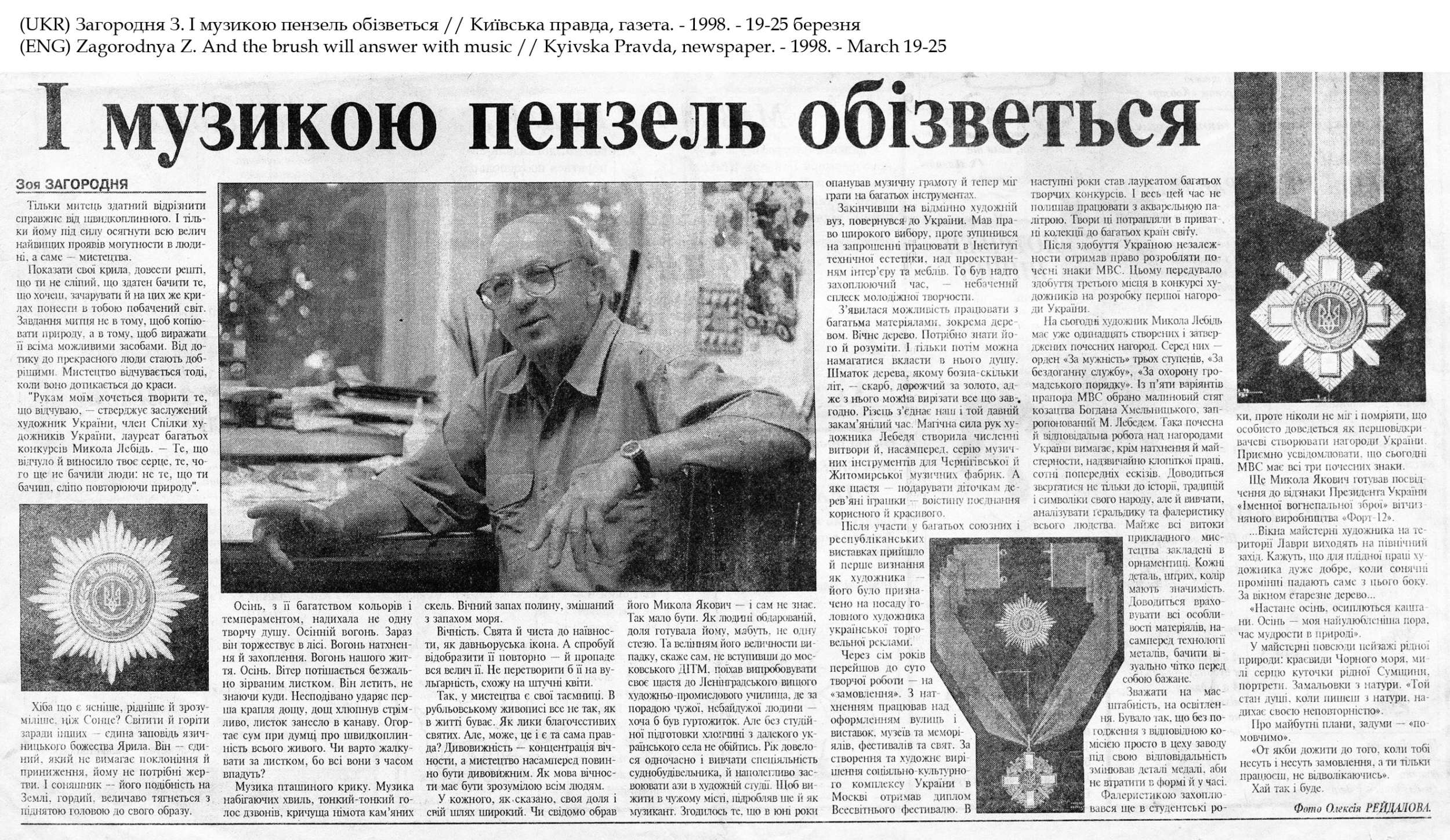
Zagorodnya Z. And the brush will answer with music Kyivska Pravda. - 1998. - March 19-25

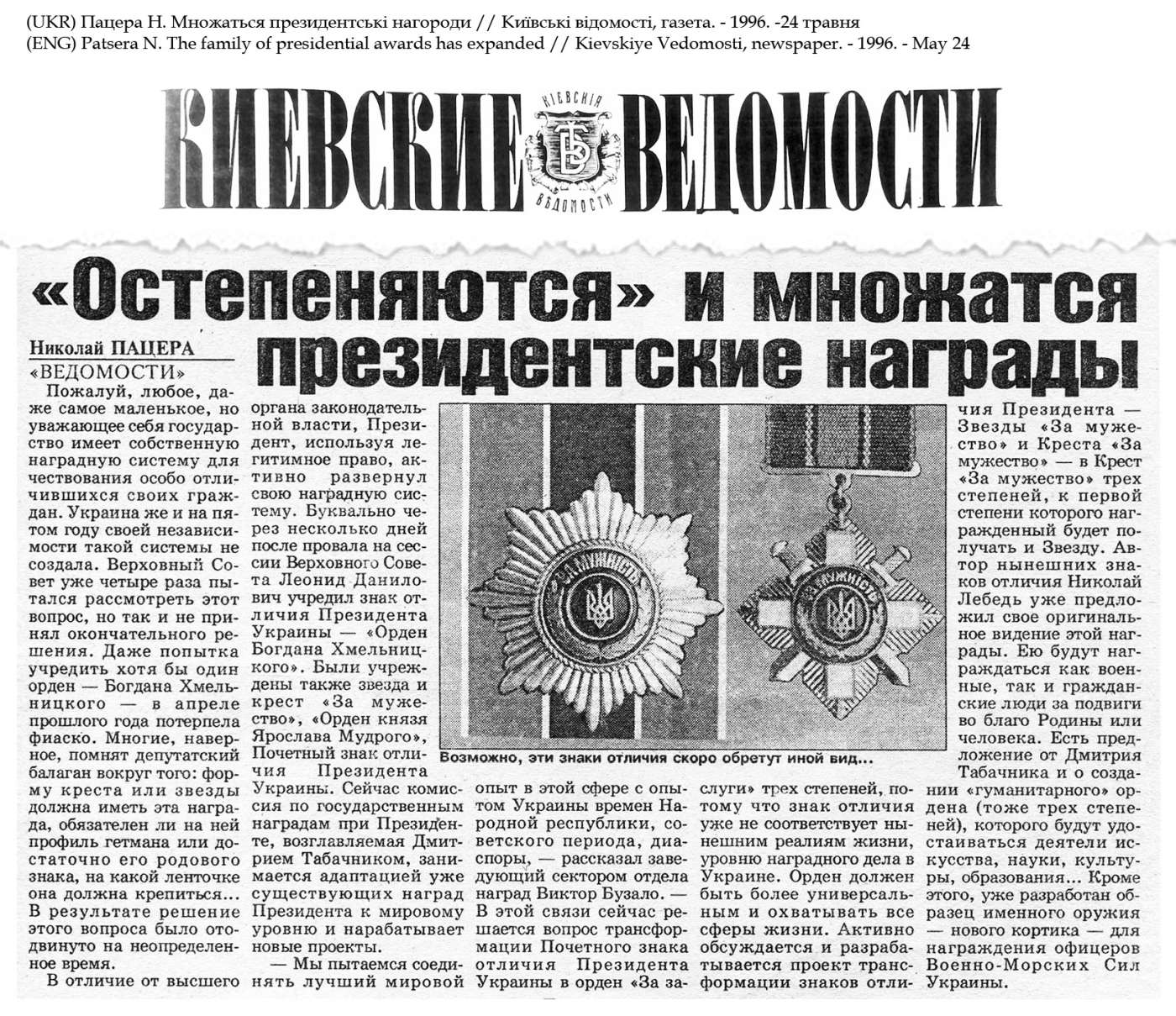
Patsera N. The family of presidential awards has expanded Kievskiye Vedomosti. - 1996. - May 24

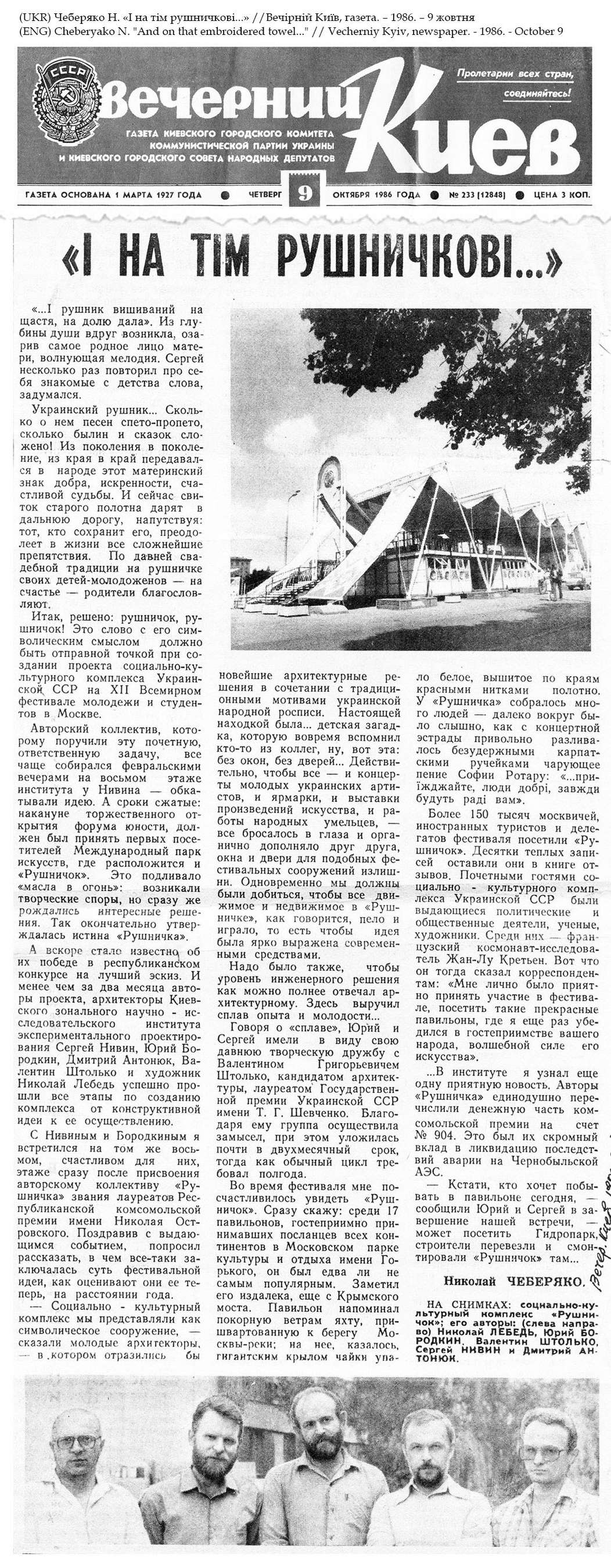
Cheberyako N. And on that embroidered towel Vecherniy Kyiv, newspaper - 1986 - October 9

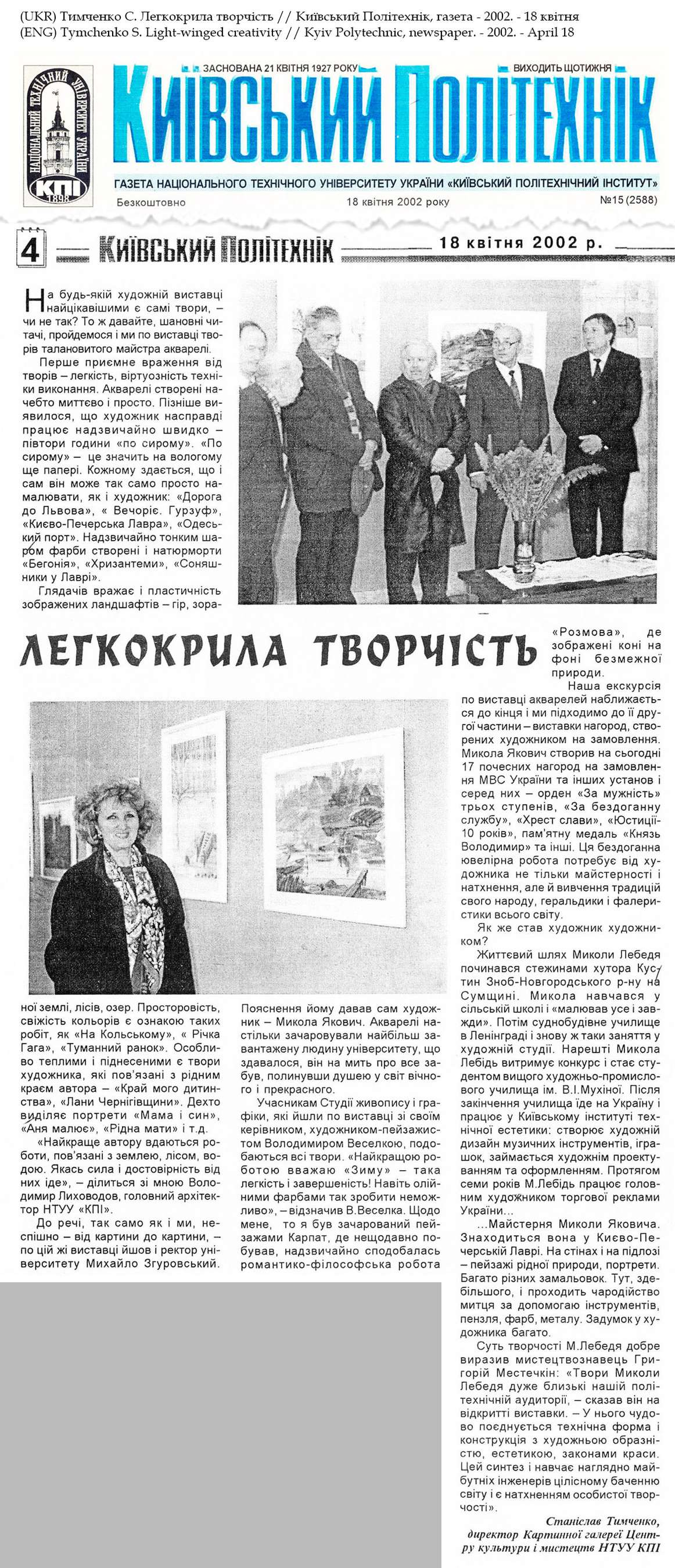
Tymchenko S. Light-winged creativity Kyiv Polytechnic, newspaper. - 2002. - April 18

== General sources ==
This article is a partial translation of the corresponding article in the Ukrainian Wikipedia, uk:Лебідь Микола Якович

1. Ігор Кромф. Наймасовіша нагорода за подвиги: 25 років ордену «За мужність» // Прямий - 2020, 29 квітня
2. Mykhailo Selivachov // Mykola Lebid: Watercolor, Design, Heraldry (in ukrainian) - К.: ВХ [Студіо], 2006
3. Селівачов М., Микола Лебідь // Ант. Вип. 16-18. — К., 2006. — С.107
4. Сопов О., Торгоненко А.. // Енциклопедичне видання "Нагороди МВС України" - 2016 - С.8-12, 14-19, 52-55, 66
5. Сопов О., Торгоненко А.. Піонери відомчих відзнак // Іменем закону. - 2011-03-31, №13
6. Лазаренко В. Історія створення медалі «За мужність в охороні державного кордону України» // Нумізматика і Фалеристика. - 2008, N21
7. Лазаренко В. Почесна Відзнака Президента України - від відзнаки до державної нагороди (1992-2002 рр.) // Нумізматика і Фалеристика. - 2008, N22
8. Николай Яковлевич Лебедь. Фотоальбом // в журн. «Ландшафт плюс». - М. - 2005, №1
9. Геральдика як засіб відродження історичних традицій України // 24 карати. - 2005. - Осінь-зима
10. Вольвач П., Ляшко В.. Радіожурнал “Віта Нова”: Художник Микола Лебідь (з аудіозаписом радіоефіру) // Радіо Свобода - 18 травня 2004
11. Микола Лебідь // Хто є хто. Київ та регіони. - 2003-2005. - Випуск V, VI
12. Walter Belanger. Mykola Lebid // Contempoartukraine. Kyiv Pechersk Lavra Studios — Ukraine, Contempoartukraine, 2004, #3 — p. 28-33 (in English and Ukrainian)
13. Довідник членів Національної спілки художників України - К., 2003. С.189
14. Tymchenko S. Light-winged creativity // Kyiv Polytechnic, newspaper. - 2002. - April 18
15. Лазаренко В. Из истории награждения за выслугу лет (Пограничные войска Украины, 2002 г.) // Нумізматика і Фалеристика. - 2002, №4
16. Загородня 3. Пензлем крилатої душі // Міліція України. - 2000, №4
17. Никитюк І. Нова прикордонна символіка та її автор // Кордон. -1999, №1
18. Відзнаки Президента України. К. Мистецтво. -1999
19. Zagorodnya Z. And the brush will answer with music // Kyivska Pravda, newspaper. - 1998. - March 19-25
20. Довідник членів Спілки художників України - К., 1998. С.83
21. Бузало В. Відзнаки особливого ґатунку. Історія створення // Міліція України. - 1997, №1
22. Куфрик Б. Як народжуються державні нагороди? // Експрес. - 1997. - 3-11 травня
23. Nerod V. Author of honorary distinctions and awards // Day, newspaper - 1997. - April 5
24. Нерод В. Поєднання знання і таланту// Іменем закону. - 1997. -17 січня
25. Нагороди України. Історія, факти, документи. У 3-х томах. - К. - 1996, т.З
26. Patsera N. The family of presidential awards has expanded // Kievskiye Vedomosti, newspaper. - 1996. - May 24
27. Бузало В. Нагороди незалежної України //Українська Газета. - 1996. - 22 лютого
28. Нет ордена в своем отечестве? // Киевские ведомости. - 1995. - 27 апреля
29. Пам’ятки України. Спеціальний випуск на замовлення Президента України. 1995. №2, стор.15
30. Cheberyako N. "And on that embroidered towel..." // Vecherniy Kyiv, newspaper. - 1986. - October 9
31. Шуйская Г. Приглашает «рушник» //Правда Украины. -1985.-25 июля.
32. Фоменко К. Приглашает «рушничок» //Комсомольское знамя. - 1985. - 27 июля
33. Петруня О. «Рушник» запрошує гостей // Прапор комунізму. -1985. - 28 липня
34. Шуйская Г. Приглашает рушничок // Правда (Москва). - 1985. - 25 июня
35. Довідник «Українські радянські художники» - К., Мистецтво, 1972. С.256
