= Mykola Karpuk =

Ukrainian bodybuilder and personal trainer

- professional bodybuilder

Personal info
- Born: September 9, 1982 (age 42); Ukraine

Best statistics

Professional (Pro) career
- Best win: NAC International World Bodybuilding Championships; 2014

Mykola Karpuk (Ukrainian: Микола Карпук; born September 2, 1982) is a Ukrainian bodybuilder and personal trainer.

== Biography ==
He has an older brother, Viktor, and a wife named Natalya—a female bodybuilder. He lives in Mykolaiv, and works as a personal trainer.

A member of the Ukrainian Federation of Bodybuilding and Athleticism (UBPF). He placed 1st during the 2010 Ukraine Cup in heavyweight category. Next year he was the absolute winner of both Kiev Cup and Grand Prix "Hero" championships. Also in 2011 Karpuk participated in IFBB's European Amateur Championships; he managed to win a bronze medal in light-heavyweight category. In 2012 he contended in IFBB World Amateur Championships, and WBPF World Championships. During both of these contests he peaked at number four in light-heavyweight category. In 2013 Karpuk won two gold medals: at the WBPF European Championships (in heavyweight category), and at the NAC World Championships (in medium-tall category). He was the winner of 2015 Ukraine Cup in heavyweight category.

== Competitive stats ==
- Height: 174 cm
- Contest weight: 90 kg
