= Larysa Krushelnytska =

Ukrainian archaeologist and librarian

- Лариса Іванівна Крушельницька
- Born: 5 April 1928; Stryi, Ukrainian SSR
- Died: 12 November 2017 (aged 89); Lviv, Ukraine
- Education: Lviv State University, Academy of Arts (Stuttgart)
- Known for: Archaeology of the Bronze and Early Iron Ages in Central and Eastern Europe; organization of 50+ archaeological expeditions; study of North-East Transcarpathia and Western Volyn
- Awards: Order of Princess Olga II and III degree; * Order of Saint George * Honorary diplomas from Verkhovna Rada of Ukraine, NASU, Ministry of Education and Science of Ukraine
- Scientific career
- Fields: Archaeology, History, Library Science
- Workplaces: Institute of Social Sciences of the Academy of Sciences of the Ukrainian SSR; * Lviv National Science Library named after Vasyl Stefanyk
- Thesis: North-East Transcarpathia in the Late Bronze and Early Iron Age (1991)

Notes
- Honorary director of Lviv National Science Library; member of Shevchenko Scientific Society; UNESCO Lviv organization

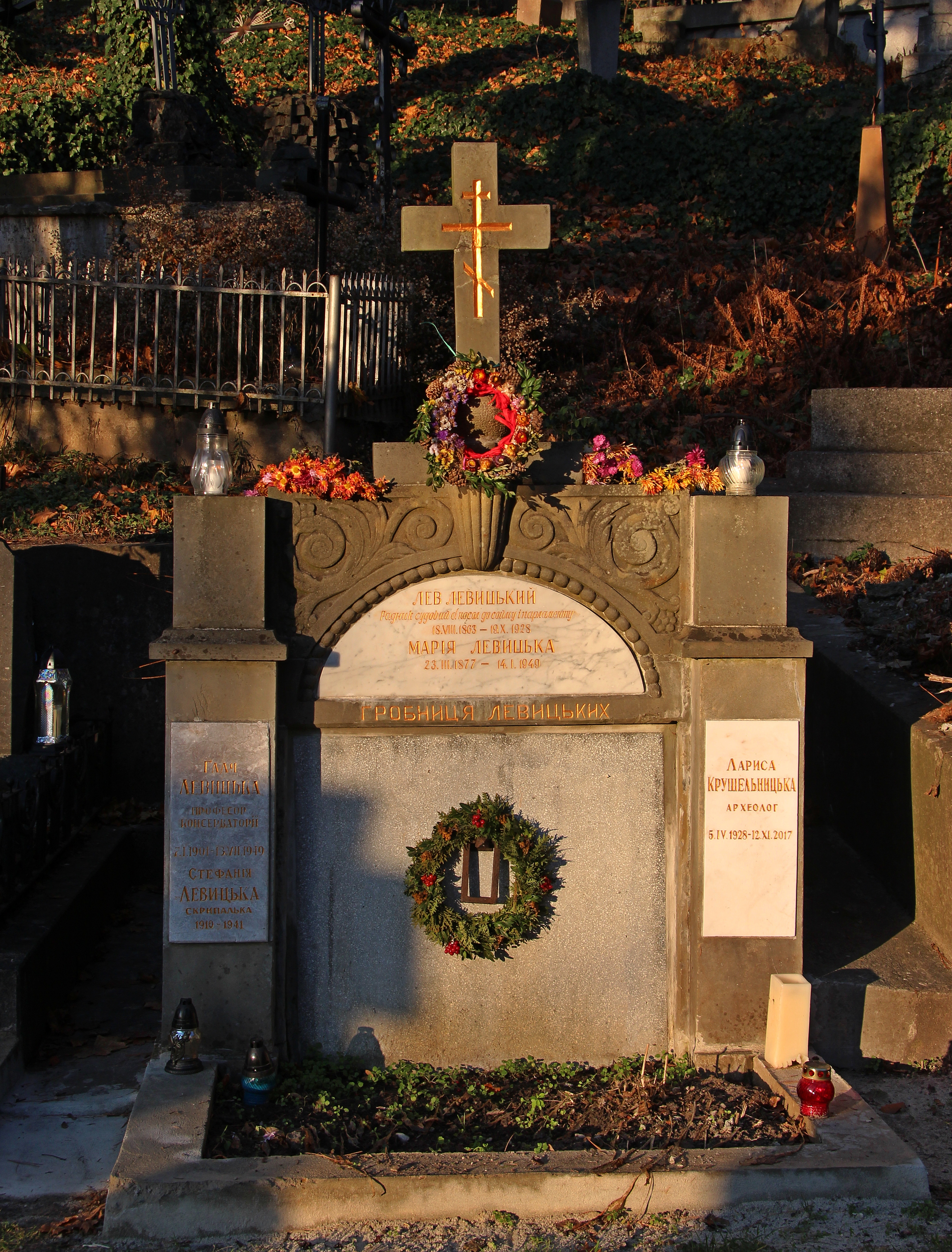
Krushelnytsky family tomb

Larysa Ivanivna Krushelnytska (5 April 1928 – 12 November 2017) was a Ukrainian archaeologist, librarian, doctor of historical sciences (1991), and professor (1999).

== Biography ==
Larysa Krushelnytska is a member of famous Ukrainian family. She was born in Stryi. From 1930, she lived with her relatives in Lviv. In 1934 she moved with her father to Kharkiv, and after the extermination of the Krushelnytskyi family, she returned to her mother in Lviv in 1937. In 1943 Krushelnyska left Lviv, occupied by the Germans, to Vienna, and then to Stuttgart, where she studied at the Academy of Arts. Then she was forced to work at an aluminum plant in the Third Reich.

In 1945 after returning to Lviv, Krushelnytska worked as a restoration artist at the Museum of Ukrainian Art and completed her secondary education through an externship. Since 1947, she was an artist-restorer at the Lviv Department of the Institute of Archaeology, studying by correspondence at the Faculty of History of Lviv State University.

From September 1947, Krushelnytska worked at the Institute of Social Sciences of the Academy of Sciences of the Ukrainian SSR.

In 1974, she defended her candidate's thesis on the topic Tribes of Upper Transnistria and Western Volyn in the Early Iron Age, and in 1991, Krushelnytska defended her doctoral thesis on the topic North-East Transcarpathia in the Late Bronze and Early Iron Age.

== Research activities ==
Krushelnytska is the only female archaeologist in the world who organized and successfully conducted more than 50 archaeological expeditions, which resulted in 206 scientific studies, of which more than 170 were published including 8 monographs. She discovered and explored about 60 monuments of the past, which brought her recognition both in Ukraine and abroad.

Krushelnytska's scientific interests cover a wide range of problems in the archaeology of the Bronze and Early Iron Ages of Central and Eastern Europe. Large-scale research on the monuments of this period, conducted for the first time on the territory of the North-Eastern Carpathian region and Western Volyn, enriched archaeological science. For the first time, Krushelnytska conducted excavations in the mountainous regions of the Carpathians, where she identified a number of centers for salt production, the scale of which had great economic importance in ancient times.

A significant contribution of Krushelnytska is her substantiation of the phenomenon of the development of the Carpathian and Volyn lands as a contact zone and peripheral territory in relation to the ethno-cultural massifs of Eastern and Central Europe. Krushelnytska's research on the territory of Middle Transnistria and her selection of the Neporotivka group of monuments, which represents the western outskirts of Chernoles culture, are of high scientific importance.

In October 1991, Larisa Krushelnytska headed the Lviv National Science Library named after Vasyl Stefanyk. As a head, she managed to save the workplaces of the personnel in a difficult time of financial troubles, lack of funds to purchase new literature. Since that time, the volume of library funds has increased by half a million, which now amounts to about 7 million preservation units, and for the first time, repair and restoration work was partially carried out in 4 buildings. Under her leadership the library's scientists continued the work on topics related to the creation of national bibliography, the study of the problems of librarianship, bibliography, and the history of periodicals. Scientific and bibliographic research and disclosure of rare funds and collections were ongoing.

Larysa Ivanivna Krushelnytska died in 2017 and is buried in the family tomb of the Krushelnytskys on field No. 23 of the Lychakiv cemetery in Lviv.

== Awards and honors ==
In different years Krushelnytska was awarded numerous honorary degrees for development of historical science and many years of scientific, organizational and publishing activity. The awards include those from the Verkhovna Rada of Ukraine (2003), the Presidium of the National Academy of Sciences of Ukraine (1998, 2002, 2003), the Ministry of Education and Science of Ukraine, regional and city councils.

In 2008, she was awarded the Order of Princess Olga III degree and the Honorary Diploma of the Cabinet of Ministers of Ukraine. In 2011, Krushelnytska was awarded the Order of Princess Olga of the II degree.

On April 5, 2013, on the occasion of her 85th birthday, she was awarded the Order of Saint George.

Krushelnytska is the honorary director of National Science Library named after Vasyl Stefanyk, the head of the archaeological commission of the Shevchenko Scientific Society, a member of the scientific society "Ukrainian Historian" (USA), a member of the UNESCO Lviv organization.

== Family ==
- Mother - Halyna Lvivna Levytska, a pianist, professor at the Music Institute named after Lysenko (1930-1939), Lviv Conservatory (1939-1949), died in Lviv in 1949.
- Father - Ivan Antonovych Krushelnytsky, a poet, and art critic, was shot by The People's Commissariat for Internal Affairs (NKVD) authorities in Kyiv in 1934.
- Grandfather (paternal) - Antin Krushelnytsky, a famous writer and Minister of Education of the Ukrainian People's Republic, was shot in 1937 together with Les Kurbas, Valerian Pidmohylyny, and other figures of the Ukrainian cultural revival.
- Grandfather (maternal) - Lev Levitsky, a Ukrainian public figure of Skilshchyna, judge.
- Daughter - Tetyana Dorianivna Krushelnytska, a member of the Lviv City Council.

== Selected works ==
- Northern Prykarpattia and Western Volhynia during the Early Iron Age. - Kyiv, 1976. - 146 p.
- Interrelationships of the population of Prykarpattia and Volhynia with the tribes of Eastern and Central Europe. - Kyiv, 1985. - 162 p.
- Chernoles culture of Middle Transnistria: Based on the materials of the Neporot group of monuments. - Lviv, 1998. - 223 p.
- Lviv Scientific Library named after V. Stefanyka of the National Academy of Sciences of Ukraine: documents, facts, comments / Ref. L. I. Krushelnytska.- Lviv, 1996. - P. 3-99.
