= Mykola Lemyk =

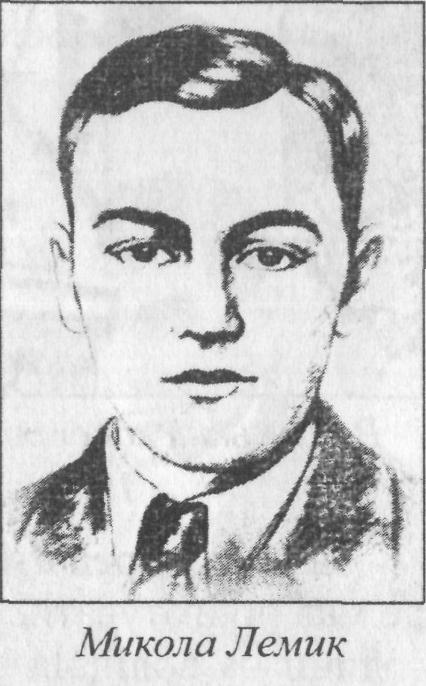
Mykola Lemyk

Mykola Semenovych Lemyk (Ukrainian: Микола Семенович Лемик; 4 April 1914 – October 1941) was a Ukrainian political activist and leader of the Organization of Ukrainian Nationalists (OUN).

== Biography ==
Lemyk was born in Soloviy, Galicia. After completing gymnasium he studied law at Lviv University and joined the youth branch of the Organization of Ukrainian Nationalists (OUN) in the early 1930s. On 21 October 1933 he was ordered by the OUN to assassinate Alexei Mailov, OGPU agent and Secretary of the Soviet Union's consulate in Lviv, which was then under Polish administration. This political assassination was to publicize and to protest against the Holodomor.

In December 1933, the Polish court in Lviv sentenced Lemyk to death, which was later commuted to life imprisonment. At the outset of World War II in 1939 Lemyk was freed from jail, and on 4 August 1940 he married Liuba Vozniak.

From 1941 Lemyk was in the regional command of the OUN-B — the faction supporting Stepan Bandera, in Eastern Ukraine. In the fall of 1941 he led the Central Committee of the OUN. In October 1941 Lemyk was arrested by the Gestapo in Myrhorod (which was then occupied by Nazi Germany), and shot (other sources state that he was hanged by the Gestapo).
