= Maria Krushelnytska =

Ukrainian pianist (1934–2025)

Maria Tarasivna Krushelnytska (Ukrainian: Марія Тарасівна Крушельницька; 31 December 1934 – 15 August 2025) was a Ukrainian pianist.

== Life and career ==
Krushelnytska was born Areta Shushkevych on 31 December 1934 in Kharkiv. She was born days after her father, Taras Krushelnytskyi, was executed in Kyiv, and due to the wishes of the father out of fear for her safety, the daughter was named under the name Areta Shushkevych. In 1935, she lived with her mother in exile in Kursk, Russia, where they were exiled after the execution of their father. During World War II, she moved with her mother to her family in Lviv. On 14 January 1958, her father was exonerated and she received a new passport, in which she was able to use her name, Maria Krushelnytska. In 1960 she completed her postgraduate studies and returned to Lviv. She began to work as a teacher at the Lviv Conservatory, and in 1991 was a professor.

Throughout her career she performed solo concerts across Ukraine, as well as Europe and the United States. During the Soviet era, she recorded an album featuring the compositions of L. Revutsky.

She was awarded both the Honored Artist of the Ukrainian SSR, People's Artist of Ukraine.

Krushelnytska died in Lviv on 15 August 2025, at the age of 90.
