= Ukrainian name =

Ukrainian names are given names that originated in Ukraine. In addition to the given names, Ukrainians also have patronymic and family names (surnames; see: Ukrainian surnames).

== History ==
Many of the oldest proto-Ukrainian names contained a wish for the newborn child to achieve power and positive qualities in life. Examples of this type of names are Yaroslav ("glorious of ferocity"), Dobroslav ("glorious of good"), Ratislav ("glorous warrior"), Semislav ("of glorious family") etc. Many such names have been preserved in toponyms such as Boryslav, Zhytomyr, Tustan, Nemyriv, as well as in modern surnames like Semyrenko, Simovych etc.

With time, inverted version of ancient Ukrainian names would appear, for example Liubomyr (from Myroliub - "lover of peace"), Myroslav (from Slavomyr - "glorious peace") etc. Many names would also receive diminutive forms, such as Stanko (from Stanymyr, Stanislav), Slavko (from Yaroslav, Myroslav, Vseslav etc.), Yarosh (from Yaroslav, Yaromyr, Yaropolk), Mylosh or Myliata (from Myloslav), Slavuta (from Slavomyr), Yarota, Yakhno, Yashko etc.

Throughout history, numerous names of foreign origin would become widespread in Ukrainian lands. Among the earliest to arrive were Germanic and Scandinavian names such as Askold and Dir, Ihor, Oleh and Olha. With the arrival of Christianity, Greek and, later, Latin names became common. Among Rus' princes it was common to keep both a traditional and a Christian name, for example prince Volodymyr was also known as Basil (Vasyliy), and Yaroslav the Wise as George (Yuriy).

Many names of foreign origin in Ukraine would receive local equivalents, for example Theodotus – Bohdan, Theodore (given name) – Boh(o)dar, Theophilus – Bohumyl. The pronunciation of the majority of foreign names was also adopted to Ukrainian phonetics. During the Modern era, usage of traditional pre-Christian names, as well as analogous newly invented names, such as Viroslav(a), Zvenyslav(a), Kvitoslav(a), Lada, once again became fashionable among the intelligentsia.

== Ukrainian given names ==
Diminutive and hypocoristic forms are male names that are native to the Ukrainian language and that have either an empty inflexional suffix (Івась, Павлусь, Гриць) or the affixes -о, -ик (Славко, Грицько, Василько, Андрійчик, Петрик, Дмитрик). Female names have the affixes -ся, -йка, -нька, (Катруся, Гануся, Соломійка, Надійка, Марієнька, Христинонька).

As in most cultures, a person has a given name chosen by his or her parents. First names in East Slavic languages mostly originate from one of three sources: Orthodox church tradition (which derives from sources of Greek origin), Catholic church tradition (of Latin origin), or native pre-Christian Slavic origins. Pre-Christian wishful names were given in the hope of controlling the fate of the people. For instance, to scare away evil, children were given names derived from dangerous predatory animals. In contrast, the names of Shchasny (Happy) or Rozumnyk (Smart) were supposed to make them happy or smart respectively.

Most names have several diminutive forms.

=== Popular Ukrainian masculine given names ===
- Альбéрт (Albert [ɐlʲˈbɛrt]), from Albert, of Germanic origin.
- Анатолій (Anatolii, [ɐnɐˈtɔl⁽ʲ⁾ij]), from Anatolius, of Greek origin.
- Андрій (Andrii [ɐn⁽ʲ⁾ˈd⁽ʲ⁾r⁽ʲ⁾ij]), equivalent to Andrew, of Greek origin.
- Антóн (Anton [ɐnˈtɔn]), Антін (Antin [ɐn⁽ʲ⁾ˈt⁽ʲ⁾in]), equivalent to Anthony, of Latin origin.
- Аркáдій (Arkadii [ɐrˈkɑd⁽ʲ⁾ij]), from Arcadius, of Greek origin.
- Арсéн (Arsen [ɐrˈsɛn]), Арсéній (Arsenii [ɐrˈsɛn⁽ʲ⁾ij]), from Arsenius, of Greek origin.
- Артéм (Artem [ɐrˈtɛm]), equivalent to Artemius, of Greek origin.
- Артур (Artur [ɐrˈtur]), equivalent to Arthur, of Latin or Celtic origin.
- Атанасій (Atanasii [ɐtɐˈnɑs⁽ʲ⁾ij]), Афанáсій (Afanasii [ɐfɐˈnɑs⁽ʲ⁾ij]), Опанас (Opanas ), Панас (Panas [pɐˈnɑs]), from Athanasius, of Greek origin.
- Богдáн (Bohdan [boɦˈdɑn]), of Slavic origin.
- Бори́с (Borys [boˈrɪs]), a pre-Christian Slavic diminutive of Борислав (Boryslav).
- Броніслáв (Bronislav [bron⁽ʲ⁾iˈslɑu̯]), Боронислáв (Boronyslav [boronɪˈslɑu̯]), of Slavic origin.
- Вади́м (Vadym [wɐˈdɪm]), equivalent to Vadim, of Persian or Slavic origin.
- Валенти́н (Valentyn [wɐlenˈtɪn]), equivalent to Valentine, of Latin origin.
- Валéрій (Valerii [wɐˈlɛr⁽ʲ⁾ij]), from Valerius, of Latin origin.
- Васи́ль (Vasyl' [wɐˈsɪlʲ]), equivalent to Basil, of Greek origin.
- Віктор (Viktor [ˈwiktor]), equivalent to Victor, of Latin origin.
- Вітáлій (Vitalii [wiˈtɑl⁽ʲ⁾ij]).
- Владислáв (Vladyslav [u̯lɐdɪˈslɑu̯]), Володислáв (Volodyslav [wolodɪˈslɑu̯]), a pre-Christian name of Slavic origin, meaning "lord of fame".
- Владлéн (Vladlen), of Russian Communist origin (Vladimir Lenin). No longer used.
- Володи́мир (Volodymyr [woloˈdɪmɪr]), a pre-Christian name of Slavic origin, equivalent to Vladimir and Waldemar.
- Всéволод (Vsevolod [ˈu̯sɛwolod]), a pre-Christian name of Slavic origin.
- В'ячеслáв (Viacheslav [u̯jɐtʃeˈslɑu̯]), equivalent to Wenceslaus, a pre-Christian name of Slavic origin.
- Геннáдій (Hennadii [ɦeˈnːɑd⁽ʲ⁾ij]), Генадій (Henadii [ɦeˈnɑd⁽ʲ⁾ij]), from Gennadius, of Greek origin.
- Григóрій (Hryhorii [ɦrɪˈɦɔr⁽ʲ⁾ij]), equivalent to Gregory, of Greek origin.
- Дави́д (Davyd [dɐˈwɪd]), from David, of Hebrew origin.
- Дани́ло (Danylo [dɐˈnɪlo]), equivalent to Daniel, of Hebrew origin.
- Дем'я́н (Demian [demˈjɑn]), equivalent to Damian, of Greek origin.
- Дени́с (Denys [deˈnɪs]), equivalent to Dennis, of Greek origin.
- Дмитрó (Dmytro [dmɪˈtrɔ]), from Demetrius, of Greek origin.
- Едуáрд (Eduard), equivalent to Edward, of Anglo-Saxon origin.
- Євгéн (Yevhen [jeu̯ˈɦɛn]), Євгеній (Yevhenii [jeu̯ˈɦɛn⁽ʲ⁾ij]), equivalent to Eugene, of Greek origin.
- Зінóвій (Zinovii [z⁽ʲ⁾iˈnɔwij]), Зеновій (Zenovii [zeˈnɔwij]), from Zenobius, of Greek origin.
- Івáн (Ivan [iˈwɑn]), equivalent to Ian, John and Sean, of Hebrew origin.
- Ігор (Ihor [ˈiɦor]), from Ingvar, of Varangian origin.
- Ілля́ (Illia [iˈlʲːɑ]), equivalent to Elias and Elijah, of Hebrew origin.
- Йóсип (Yosyp [ˈjɔsɪp]), Йосиф (Yosyf [ˈjɔsɪf]), Осип (Osyp [ˈɔsɪp]), equivalent to Joseph, of Hebrew origin.
- Казими́р (Kazymyr [kɐzɪˈmɪr]), equivalent to Casimir, of Slavic origin.
- Кири́ло (Kyrylo [kɪˈrɪlo]), equivalent to Cyril, of Greek origin.
- Костянти́н (Kostiantyn [kosʲtʲɐnˈtɪn]), equivalent to Constantine, of Latin origin.
- Кузьмá (Kuzma [kʊzʲˈmɑ]), from Cosmas, of Greek origin.
- Лев (Lev [lɛu̯]), equivalent to Leo, of Greek origin.
- Леонід (Leonid [leoˈn⁽ʲ⁾id]), from Leonidas, of Greek origin.
- Леóнтій (Leontii [leˈɔn⁽ʲ⁾t⁽ʲ⁾ij]), from Leontius, of Greek origin.
- Любоми́р (Liubomyr [lʲʊboˈmɪr]), of Slavic origin.
- Макси́м (Maksym [mɐkˈsɪm]), from Maximus, of Latin origin, meaning "greatest".
- Маркія́н (Markiian), equivalent to Marcian, of Latin origin.
- Маркó (Marko [mɐrˈkɔ]), equivalent to Marcus and Mark, of Latin origin.
- Мар'я́н (Marian [mɐrˈjɑn]), from Marianus, of Latin origin.
- Матвій (Matvii [mɐt⁽ʲ⁾ˈwij]), equivalent to Mathias and Matthew, of Hebrew origin.
- Мики́та (Mykyta [mɪˈkɪtɐ]), equivalent to Nikita, from Nicetas, of Greek origin.
- Микóла (Mykola [mɪˈkɔlɐ]), equivalent to Nicholas, of Greek origin.
- Мирóн (Myron [mɪˈrɔn]), of Greek origin.
- Мирослáв (Myroslav [mɪroˈslɑu̯]), of Slavic origin.
- Михáйло (Mykhailo [mɪˈxɑjlo]), equivalent to Michael and Mitchell, of Hebrew origin.
- Назáр (Nazar [nɐˈzɑr]), Назáрій (Nazarii [nɐˈzɑr⁽ʲ⁾ij]), from Nazarius, a Christian name of ambiguous linguistic origins.
- Олéг (Oleh [oˈlɛɦ]), equivalent to Helge, of Varangian origin.
- Олексáндр (Oleksandr [olekˈsɑnd(e)r]), equivalent to Alexander, of Greek origin.
- Олексій (Oleksii [olekˈs⁽ʲ⁾ij]), Олекса (Oleksa [oˈlɛksɐ]), equivalent to Alexis, of Greek origin.
- Омеля́н (Omelian [omeˈlʲɑn]), from Aemilianus, of Latin origin.
- Орéст (Orest [oˈrɛst]), from Orestes, of Greek origin.
- Остáп (Ostap [oˈstɑp]), Євстафій (Yevstafii [jeu̯ˈstɑfij]), equivalent to Eustace, of Greek origin.
- Павлó (Pavlo ([pɐu̯ˈlɔ]), equivalent to Paul, of Latin origin.
- Петрó (Petro [peˈtrɔ]), equivalent to Peter, of Greek origin.
- Пили́п (Pylyp [pɪˈlɪp]), equivalent to Philip, of Greek origin.
- Ромáн (Roman [roˈmɑn]), of Latin origin.
- Ростислáв (Rostyslav [rostɪˈslɑu̯]), of Slavic origin.
- Руслáн (Ruslan [rʊˈslɑn]), equivalent to Arslan, of Tatar origin.
- Сáва (Sava [ˈsɑwɐ]), of Slavic origin.
- Святослáв (Sviatoslav [sʲwʲɐtoˈslɑu̯]), a pre-Christian name of Slavic origin.
- Семéн (Semen), equivalent to Simeon, of Hebrew origin.
- Сергій (Serhii [serˈɦij]), equivalent to Serge, of Latin origin.
- Станислáв (Stanyslav [stɐnɪˈslɑu̯]), Станислáв (Stanislav [stɐn⁽ʲ⁾iˈslɑu̯]), of Slavic origin.
- Степáн (Stepan [steˈpɑn]), Стефан (Stefan [steˈfɑn]), equivalent to Stephen, of Greek origin.
- Тарáс (Taras [tɐˈrɑs, ˈtɑrɐs]), of Greek or Dacian origin.
- Тимофій (Tymofii [tɪmoˈfij]), equivalent to Timothy, of Greek origin.
- Тиму́р (Tymur [tɪˈmur]), of Mongol or Turkic origin.
- Трохи́м (Trokhym [troˈxɪm]).
- Фéдір (Fedir [ˈfɛd⁽ʲ⁾ir]), Федор (Fedor [ˈfɛdor]), Теодор (Teodor [teoˈdɔr]), Хведір (Khvedir [ˈxwɛd⁽ʲ⁾ir]), equivalent to Theodore, of Greek origin.
- Феодóсій (Feodosii [feoˈdɔs⁽ʲ⁾ij]), from Theodosius, of Greek origin.
- Франц (Frants [frɑnts]), from Franz, equivalent to Francis, of Latin origin.
- Ю́рій (Yurii [ˈjur⁽ʲ⁾ij]), Геóргій (Heorhii [ɦeˈɔrɦij]), Єгóр (Yehor [jeˈɦɔr]), equivalent to George, of Greek origin.
- Юхи́м (Yukhym [jʊˈxɪm]), from Euthymius, of Greek origin.
- Я́ків (Yakiv [ˈjɑkiu̯]), equivalent to Jacob and James, of Hebrew origin.
- Ярослáв (Yaroslav [jɐroˈslɑu̯]), of Slavic origin.

=== Popular Ukrainian feminine given names ===
- Áлла (Alla [ˈɑlːɐ]), of Gothic origin.
- Анастасія (Anastasiia [ɐnɐstɐˈs⁽ʲ⁾ijɐ]), of Greek origin.
- Ангеліна (Anhelina [ɐnɦeˈl⁽ʲ⁾inɐ]), from Angelina, of Greek origin.
- Антоніна (Antonina [ɐntoˈn⁽ʲ⁾inɐ]), of Latin origin.
- Валенти́на (Valentyna [wɐlenˈtɪnɐ]), from Valentina, feminine of Valentyn.
- Васили́на (Vasylyna [wɐsɪˈlɪnɐ]), feminine of Vasyl'.
- Вероніка (Veronika [weroˈn⁽ʲ⁾ikɐ]), from Veronica, a Latin alteration of Berenice, of Ancient Macedonian origin.
- Віктóрія (Viktoriia [wikˈtɔr⁽ʲ⁾ijɐ]), feminine of Viktor, from Victoria, of Latin origin.
- Веселка (Veselka), Ukrainian word веселка, meaning "rainbow".
- Віра (Vira [ˈwirɐ]), meaning "faith", calque from Greek Πίστη (Piste).
- Гали́на (Halyna [ɦɐˈlɪnɐ]), from Galene, of Greek origin.
- Гáнна (Hanna [ˈɦɑnːɐ]), Анна (Anna [ˈɑnːɐ]), equivalent to Anne, of Hebrew origin.
- Дари́на (Daryna [dɐˈrɪnɐ]), of Slavic origin.
- Дáрія (Dariia [ˈdɑr⁽ʲ⁾ijɐ]), Дáр'я (Daria [ˈdɑrjɐ]), from Daria, of Persian origin.
- Діна (Dina (given name)), from Dinah, of Hebrew origin.
- Єва (Yeva [ˈjɛwɐ]), equivalent to Eve, of Hebrew origin.
- Євдокія (Yevdokiia [jeu̯doˈkijɐ]), from Eudocia, of Greek origin.
- Євгéнія (Yevheniia [jeu̯ˈɦɛn⁽ʲ⁾ijɐ]), Євгена (Yevhena), from Eugenia, feminine of Yevhen and Yevhenii, of Greek origin.
- Єлизавéта (Yelyzaveta [jelɪzɐˈwɛtɐ]), Єлізавета (Yelizaveta [jel⁽ʲ⁾izɐˈwɛtɐ]), Єлисавета (Yelysaveta [jelɪsɐˈwɛtɐ]), equivalent to Elizabeth and Isabella, of Hebrew origin.
- Зінаїда (Zinaida [z⁽ʲ⁾inɐˈjidɐ]), from Zenaida, of Greek origin.
- Злáта (Zlata [ˈzlɑtɐ]), of Slavic origin.
- Зоря́на (Zoriana [zoˈrʲɑnɐ]), Slavic for "star", compare to Estelle (given name), Stella.
- Зóя (Zoia), from Zoe, of Greek origin.
- Івáнна (Ivanna [iˈwɑnːɐ]), Жáнна (Zhanna), Я́на (Yana [ˈjɑnɐ]), equivalent to Jane, Jean, Joan, Joanna and Joanne, feminine of Ivan, of Hebrew origin.
- Інна (Inna [ˈinːɐ]).
- Іри́на (Iryna [iˈrɪnɐ]), equivalent to Irene, of Greek origin.
- Калина (Kalyna), guelder-rose, symbol of Ukraine, the Ukrainian people.
- Катери́на (Kateryna [kɐteˈrɪnɐ]), equivalent to Caitlin, Karen, Katherine, Kathleen and Katrina, of Greek origin.
- Клáвдія (Klavdiia [ˈklɑu̯d⁽ʲ⁾ijɐ]), from Claudia, of Latin origin.
- Лари́са (Larysa [lɐˈrɪsɐ]).
- Леоніда (Leonida [leoˈn⁽ʲ⁾idɐ]), feminine of Leonid.
- Лідія (Lidiia [ˈl⁽ʲ⁾id⁽ʲ⁾ijɐ]), from Lydia, of Greek origin.
- Лілія (Liliia [ˈl⁽ʲ⁾il⁽ʲ⁾ijɐ]).
- Любóв (Liubov [lʲʊˈbɔu̯]), Любомира (Liubomyra [lʲʊboˈmɪrɐ]), feminine of Liubomyr, meaning "love", calque from Greek Αγάπη (Agape).
- Людми́ла (Liudmyla [lʲʊdˈmɪlɐ]), equivalent to Ludmila, of Slavic origin.
- Маргари́та (Marharyta [mɐrɦɐˈrɪtɐ]), equivalent to Margaret and Marjorie, of Persian origin.
- Мари́на (Maryna [mɐˈrɪnɐ]), from Marina, of Latin origin.
- Марія (Mariia [mɐˈr⁽ʲ⁾ijɐ]), from Maria, equivalent to Marie, Mary and Miriam, of Hebrew origin.
- Мелáнія (Melaniia [meˈlɑn⁽ʲ⁾ijɐ]), equivalent to Melanie, of Greek origin.
- Надія (Nadiia [nɐˈd⁽ʲ⁾ijɐ]), meaning "hope", calque from Greek Ἐλπίς (Elpis).
- Натáлія (Nataliia [nɐˈtɑl⁽ʲ⁾ijɐ]), Наталя (Natalia [nɐˈtɑlʲɐ]), equivalent to Natalie, of Latin origin.
- Ніна (Nina [ˈn⁽ʲ⁾inɐ]), from Nino, of ambiguous ancient Near Eastern origin.
- Оксáна (Oksana [okˈsɑnɐ]), Ксéнія (Kseniia [ˈksɛn⁽ʲ⁾ijɐ]), from Xenia, of Greek origin. The form Oksana is most common.
- Олексáндра (Oleksandra [olekˈsɑndrɐ]), Лéся (Lesia [ˈlɛsʲɐ]), Олеся (Olesia [oˈlɛsʲɐ]), feminine of Oleksandr, equivalent to Alexandra, of Greek origin.
- Олéна (Olena [oˈlɛnɐ]), from Helena, equivalent to Elaine, Ellen and Helen, of Greek origin.
- Óльга (Olha [ˈɔlʲɦɐ]), feminine of Oleh, a pre-Christian name derived from Helga, of Varangian origin.
- Раїса (Raisa [rɐˈjisɐ]).
- Романа (Romana), feminine of Roman.
- Світлáна (Svitlana [s⁽ʲ⁾witˈlɑnɐ]), meaning "shining one", of Slavic origin.
- Сніжáна (Snizhana [s⁽ʲ⁾n⁽ʲ⁾iˈʒɑnɐ]).
- Соломія (Solomiia [soloˈmijɐ]), equivalent to Salome, of Hebrew origin.
- Софія (Sofiia [soˈfijɐ]), from Sophia, equivalent to Sophie, of Greek origin.
- Стефáнія (Stefaniia [steˈfɑn⁽ʲ⁾ijɐ]), Степанія (Stepaniia), Степани́да (Stepanyda [stepɐˈnɪdɐ]), equivalent to Stephanie, masculine of Stefan and Stepan, of Greek origin.
- Таїсія (Taisiia [tɐˈjis⁽ʲ⁾ijɐ]), Таїса (Taisa [tɐˈjisɐ]), from Thaïs, of Greek origin.
- Тамáра (Tamara), from Tamar, of Hebrew origin.
- Текля (Teklia [ˈtɛklʲɐ]), from Thecla, of Greek origin.
- Тетя́на (Tetiana [teˈtʲɑnɐ]), of Latin origin.
- Уля́на (Uliana [ʊˈlʲɑnɐ]), equivalent to Gillian or Juliana, of Latin origin.
- Федóра (Fedora [feˈdɔrɐ]), equivalent to Theodora, masculine of Fedir, Fedor, Khvedir and Teodor, of Greek origin.
- Христи́на (Khrystyna [xrɪˈstɪnɐ]), equivalent to Christine, of Greek origin.
- Ю́лія (Yuliia [ˈjul⁽ʲ⁾ijɐ]), equivalent to Julia and Julie, of Latin origin.
- Яніна (Yanina), diminutive of Yana, equivalent to Janine.

=== Special names ===
In Ukrainian traditional culture, illegitimate children were sometimes given rare and unusual names. According to Mykhailo Zubrytskyi, in Boyko lands children bought out of wedlock would be baptized under names such as Yov (Job) or Mokriy (Mocius). Based on his own studies and research by Oskar Kolberg, Zenon Kuzelia distinguished names such as Fteopump (Theopompus), Onysyfor (Onesiphorus), Amfylokh (Amphilochius), Fifrona (Febronia) or Glikeria (Glyceria) as traditional for illegitimate children in the region of Pokutia. In the area of Stryi typical names for children born out of wedlock were Havrylo (Gabriel) and Danylo (Daniel). In the vicinity of Sambir girls recognized as bastards were traditionally given the names Khrystyna (Christina) or Pelaha (Pelagia). The protagonist of the novel Do Oxen Low When Mangers are Full? by Panas Myrny and Ivan Bilyk was baptized as Nechypir (Nicephorus). In many cases, people bearing such names would be called differently by their family, and there were also many attempts to change the name in official records as well. The tradition of naming illegitimate children with distinct names disappeared during the years of Soviet rule, when parents received the right to name their children on their own.

== See also ==
- Slavic names
- Slavic surnames
- Ukrainian surnames
