= Maryna =

Maryna may refer to:

== People ==
- Maryna Aleksiyiva (born 2001), Ukrainian synchronised swimmer
- Maryna Antsybor (born 1987), Ukrainian cross country skier
- Maryna Arzamasava (born 1987), Belarusian middle-distance runner
- Maryna Asauliuk (born 1980), Ukrainian fashion designer, stylist, and art director
- Maryna Bardina (born 1992), Ukrainian politician
- Maryna Bazhanova (born 1962), Ukrainian former handball player
- Maryna Bekh-Romanchuk (born 1995), Ukrainian long jumper and triple jumper
- Maryna Cherniak (born 1988), Ukrainian judoka
- Maryna Chernyshova (born 1999), Ukrainian former tennis player
- Maryna Damantsevich (born 1984), Belarusian long distance runner
- Maryna Doroshenko (1981–2014), Ukrainian basketball player
- Maryna Dubrova (born 1978), Ukrainian long-distance runner
- Maryna Dyachenko (born 1968), Ukrainian author and Playwright
- Maryna Er Gorbach (born 1981), Ukrainian filmmaker
- Maryna Gąsienica-Daniel (born 1994), Polish alpine ski racer
- Maryna Godwin (born 1944), South African retired tennis player
- Maryna Hancharova (born 1990), Belarusian rhythmic gymnast
- Maryna Hladun (born 1992), Ukrainian beach volleyball player
- Maryna Hrymych (born 1961), Ukrainian novelist and academician
- Maryna Ilyinskaya (born 1999), Ukrainian badminton player
- Maryna Ivaniuk (born 1990), Ukrainian professional racing cyclist
- Maryna Ivashchanka (born 1993), Belarusian basketball player
- Maryna Kolesnykova (born 2000), Ukrainian swimmer
- Maryna Konieva (born 1987), Ukrainian taekwondo athlete
- Maryna Kyiko (born 1987), Ukrainian trampoline gymnast
- Maryna Kylypko (born 1995), Ukrainian pole vaulter
- Maryna Lazebna (born 1975), Ukrainian civil servant and politician
- Maryna Linchuk (born 1987), Belarusian fashion model
- Maryna Lisohor (born 1983), Ukrainian cross-country skier
- Maryna Litvinchuk (born 1988), Belarusian sprint canoeist
- Maryna Lytovchenko (born 1991), Ukrainian para table tennis player
- Maryna Masalska (born 1985), Ukrainian former footballer
- Maryna Maydanova (born 1982), Ukrainian sprinter
- Maryna Mazhula (born 1983), Ukrainian paracanoeist
- Maryna Moroz (born 1991), Ukrainian mixed martial artist
- Maryna Nikitina (born 1986), Ukrainian politician
- Maryna Novik (born 1984), Belarusian female javelin thrower
- Maryna Pautaran (born 1988), Belarusian canoer
- Maryna Pestryakova (born 1972), Ukrainian cross-country skier
- Maryna Piddubna (born 1998), Ukrainian Paralympic swimmer
- Maryna Poroshenko (born 1962), wife of Petro Poroshenko, former First Lady of Ukraine
- Maryna Prokofyeva (born 1982), Ukrainian judo ka
- Maryna Proskurina (born 1985), Ukrainian former artistic gymnast
- Maryna Pryshchepa (born 1983), Ukrainian judoka
- Maryna Shkermankova (born 1990), Belarusian weightlifter
- Maryna Shukyurava (born 1980), Belarusian rock singer
- Maryna Slutskaya (born 1991), Belarusian judoka
- Maryna Sokolyan (born 1979), Ukrainian author
- Maryna Striletska (born 1983), Ukrainian association football referee
- Maryna Tkachuk (born 1964), Ukrainian historian of philosophy
- Maryna Tkachenko (born 1965), Ukrainian basketball player
- Maryna Vasileuskaya (born 1990), Belarusian flight attendant
- Maryna Verbova (born 1998), Ukrainian Paralympic swimmer
- Maryna Vergelyuk (born 1978), Ukrainian team handball player
- Maryna Viazovska (born 1984), Ukrainian mathematician
- Maryna Vlasenko (born 1987), Ukrainian handballer player
- Maryna Vroda (born 1982), Ukrainian film director and screenwriter
- Maryna Vynohradova (born 1983), Ukrainian-Italian field hockey player
- Maryna Zanevska (born 1993), Ukrainian tennis player
- Maryna Zuyeva (born 1992), Belarusian speed skater and cyclist

== Places ==
- Maryna, Podlaskie Voivodeship, a village in Poland
