= Hryhoriy Nemyria =

Ukrainian politician (1960)

- Григoрій Немиря
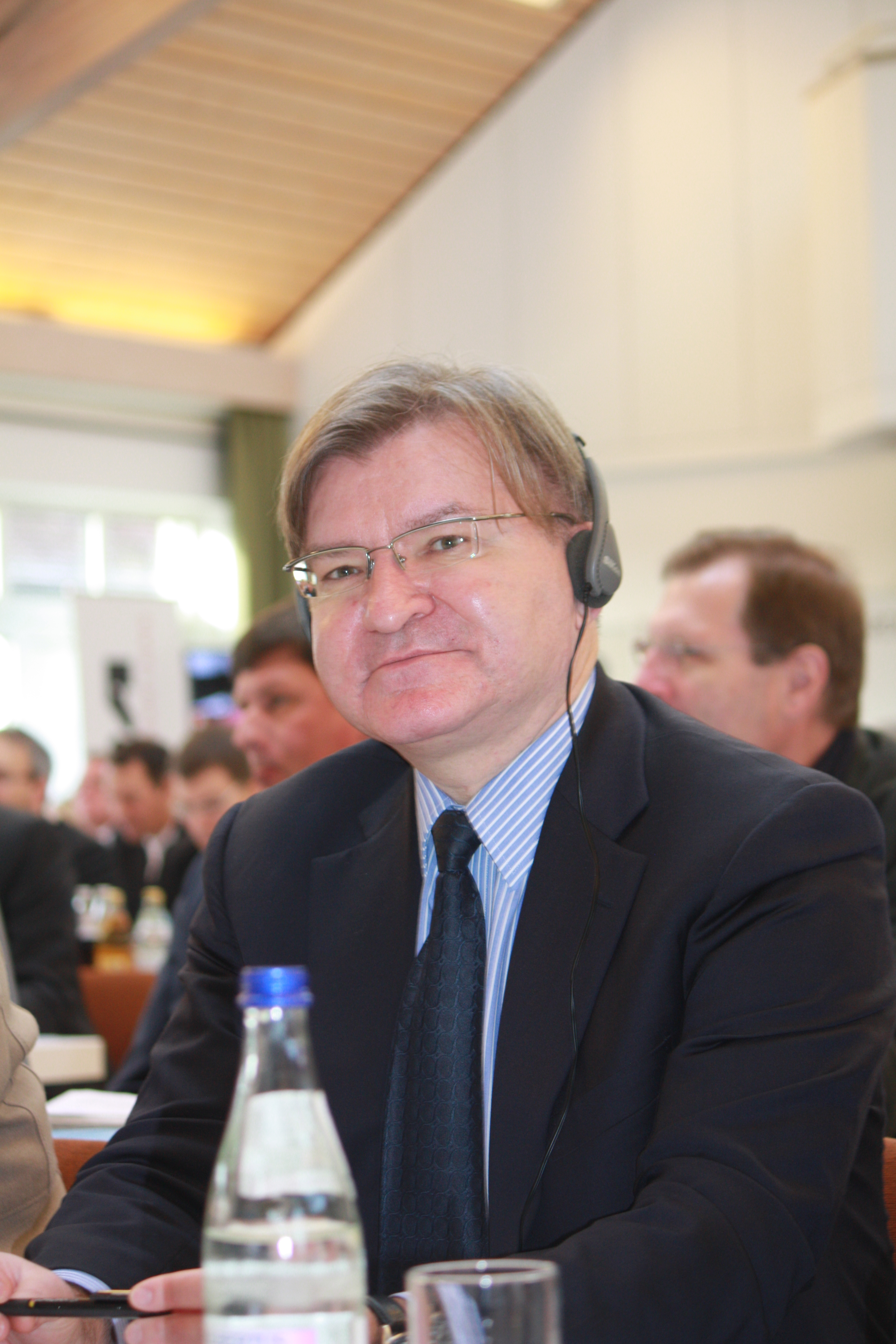
- Nemyria in 2014

Deputy Prime Minister of Ukraine for European Integration
- In office December 18, 2007 – March 11, 2010
- President: Viktor Yushchenko
- Prime Minister: Yulia Tymoshenko

Personal details
- Born: April 5, 1960 (age 66) Donetsk, Ukrainian SSR, Soviet Union (now Ukraine)
- Citizenship: Ukraine
- Party: Batkivshchyna
- Children: 2
- Profession: historian; sociologist; political scientist

Hryhoriy Mykhailovych Nemyria (also spelled Nemyrya; Ukrainian: Григо́рій Миха́йлович Неми́ря; born 5 April 1960) is a Ukrainian politician, historian, and sociologist, who served as Deputy Prime Minister of Ukraine for European Integration from 2007 to 2010.

It is believed that, as Batkivshchyna member, Nemyrya deals with international issues in Yulia Tymoshenko's team. He was called "Tymoshenko's personal minister of foreign affairs" and "unofficial ambassador of Yulia Tymoshenko and Batkivshchyna in the European Union and the United States".

== Family ==
Nemyria is married to Lyudmila Nemyrya. He has a son Mykhailo, and a daughter.

== Early years and education ==
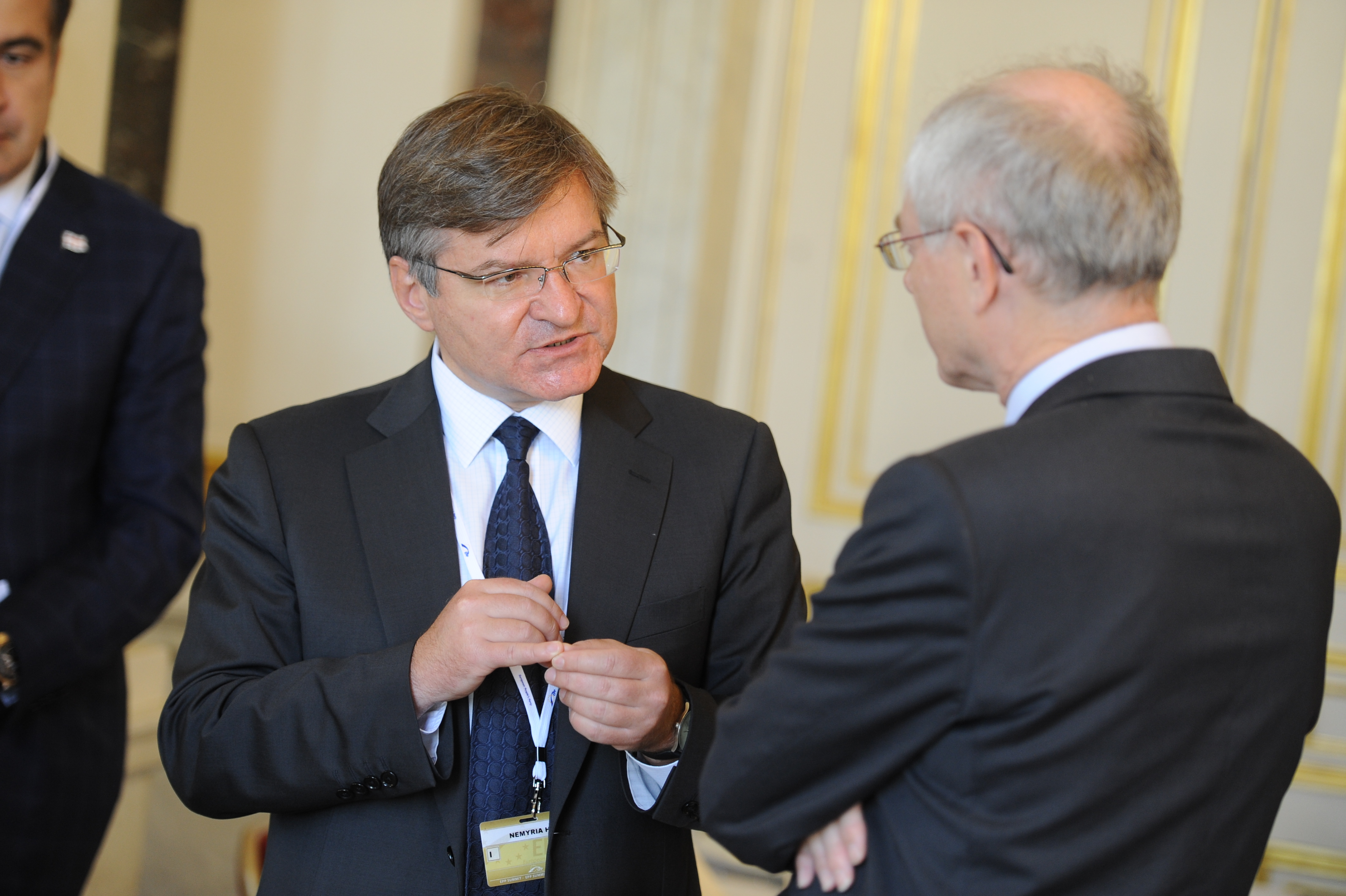
Nemyria in 2011

Nemyria was born on April 5, 1960, in Donetsk. In 1977, he began his academic career. He has an MA in history from Donetsk State University with honors, and a Ph.D. from Kyiv Shevchenko University. From 1996 to 1998, he was Deputy Rector of the National University of Kyiv Mohyla Academy and chaired the European Integration Department of the National Academy of Public Administration. He is also a graduate of the National Security Program at the John F. Kennedy School of Government, Harvard.

== Career ==
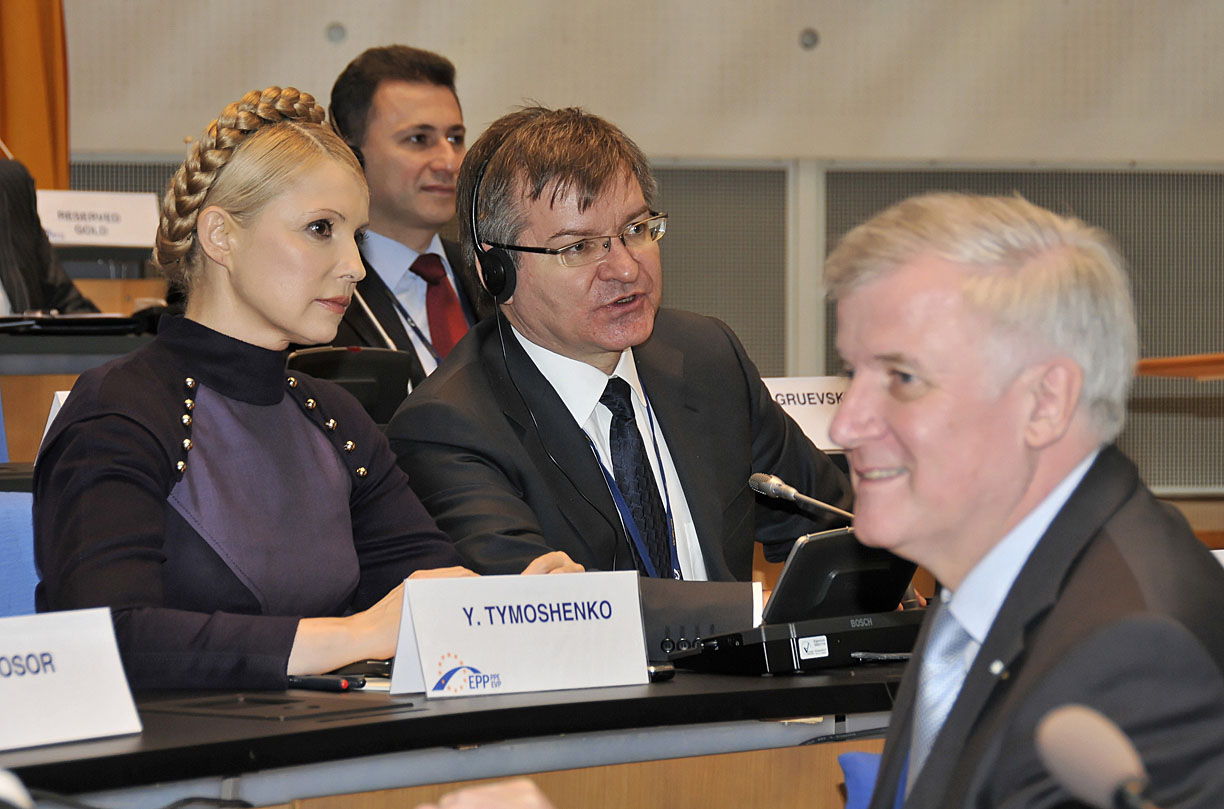
Yulia Tymoshenko at the EPP congress in Bonn in 2009

In the previous Verkhovna Rada convocations, Nemyria chaired the Committees on European Integration and on Human Rights. He served as Deputy Prime Minister of Ukraine in the Second Tymoshenko Government (2007–2010). He was also Governor from Ukraine in the World Bank and co-chairman of the Ukraine-China Intergovernmental Commission on Trade and Economic Cooperation.

From 2006 to 2007, Nemyria was the Deputy Head of the Parliamentary Delegation to the PACE and the Ukrainian delegation to the Committee on Parliamentary Cooperation between Ukraine and the European Union. In the First Tymoshenko Government, he served as her Foreign Policy Advisor.

From 2012 to 2014, Nemyria headed the Parliamentary Committee on European Integration.

From December 2014 to August 2019, Nemyria headed the Verkhovna Rada Committee on Human Rights. At a meeting of the committee, Nemyria spoke in support of Kotsaba, who was accused of treason, saying that "the situation with Ruslan Kotsaba causes significant damage to the image of Ukraine and is absolutely unacceptable in a legal and democratic state, which Ukraine has constitutionally proclaimed itself to be."

He was elected to parliament as a candidate from Batkivshchyna in the 2019 Ukrainian parliamentary election, No. 8 on the list. Since September 2019, he has been the First Deputy Chairman of the Verkhovna Rada Committee on Foreign Policy and Interparliamentary Cooperation, Chairman of the Subcommittee on Global Risks and Challenges.

== Other activities ==
Nemyria was chief editor of the scientific journal "New Security", and head of the Department of European Integration of the National Academy of Public Administration of the President of Ukraine. At various times he also served as a consultant to the Verkhovna Rada of Ukraine on European integration, was the chief advisor to MDCSU Ukraine, and advisor to then-Prime Minister Yulia Tymoshenko.

At various times, he was:

- Member of the Center for Strategic and International Studies (CSIS, Washington 1994)
- Member of the International Institute for Strategic Studies (IISS, London)
- Member of the Advisory Council for Central and Eastern Europe at Freedom House as well.

== Earnings ==
According to an electronic declaration, in 2019, Hryhoriy Nemyria received ₴1,052,192 (US$38,970) as salary and reimbursement of expenses as deputy of the Verkhovna Rada. On bank accounts, Nemyria had US$22,896, €8,619 and ₴39,919. He also declared US$87,800 and ₴200,000 in cash. Additionally, Hryhoriy Nemyria had an apartment (total area of 81,54 m^{2}) and cottage (total area of 361,2 m^{2}). Hryhoriy Nemyria also declared a 2009 MAZDA CX-7 car.

== See also ==
- Andrii Baumeister
- Maryna Tkachuk
