= List of National University of Kyiv-Mohyla Academy people =

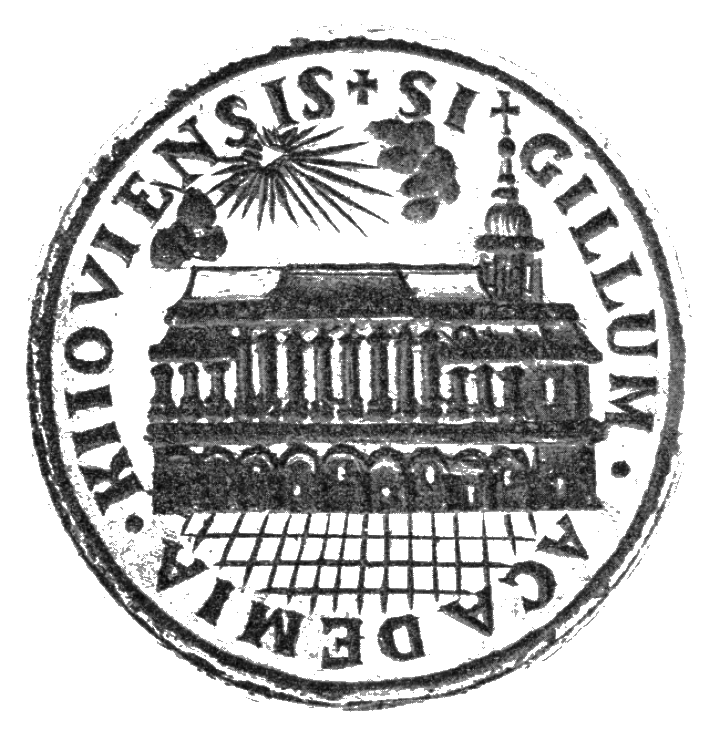
Seal of Kyiv Mohyla Academy.

This is a list of notable people associated with the National University of Kyiv-Mohyla Academy (NaUKMA), a public research university located in Kyiv, Ukraine. Students, alumni and faculty members of the university and all its predecessor institutions including Kyiv Brotherhood School (KBS), Kyiv-Mohyla Collegium (KMC), Kyiv-Mohyla Academy (KMA) and Kyiv Theological Academy (KTA) are included in this list.

Many students and professors of Kyiv-Mohyla Academy in the 17th and 18th centuries pursued many activities except church career. They were often also writers, philosophers, theologicians and educators in a broad sense. This is indicated in the list where appropriate.

== Religion ==
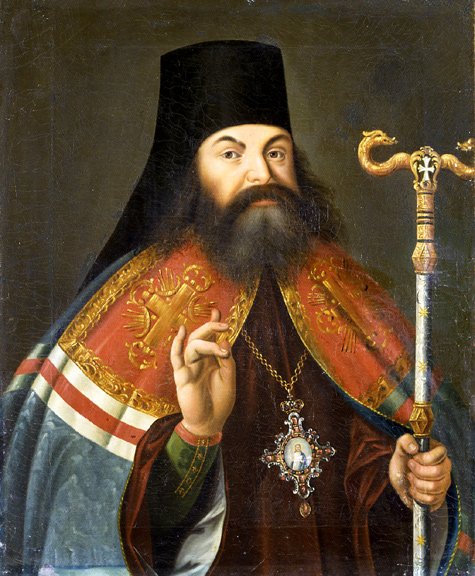
Feofan Prokopovich, archbishop, philosopher, writer

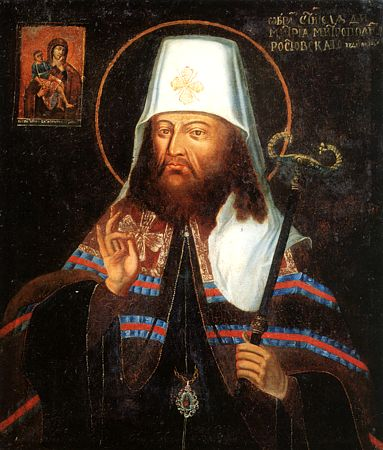
Dimitry of Rostov, archbishop

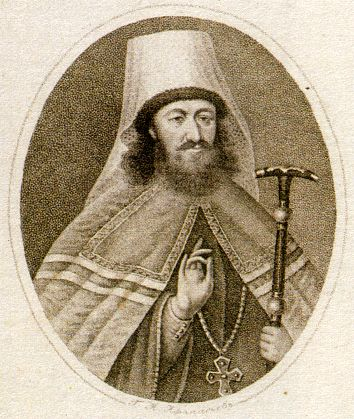
Stephen Yavorsky, archbishop

Name	Relationship to the university	Notability	Reference
Sylvestr Kosiv	professor of KMC	Metropolitan of Kiev, writer	
Gavril Bănulescu-Bodoni	student of KMA	Metropolitan of Moldavia (1792); Metropolitan of Kherson and Crimea (1793–1799); Metropolitan of Kiev and Halych (1799–1803); Exarch of Moldo-Wallachia (1806–1812); Metropolitan of Chişinău (1812–1821)	
Macarius I	student, professor of KTA	Metropolitan of Moscow and Kolomna	
Nicodim Munteanu	student of KTA	Patriarch of All Romania	
Stephen Yavorsky	student of KMA	Metropolitan archbishop of Ryazan and Murom; first president of the Most Holy Synod; writer	
Feofan Prokopovich	student, professor, rector of KMA	Metropolitan archbishop of Novgorod and Velykolutsk; philosopher; writer	
Dimitry of Rostov	student of KMA	Metropolitan archbishop of Rostov	
Epifany Slavinetsky	student, professor of KMA	Ecclesiastical expert of the Russian Orthodox Church	
Paisius Velichkovsky	student of KTA	The founder of modern Eastern Orthodox staretsdom; writer; philosopher	
Constantius I	student of KTA	Ecumenical Patriarch of Constantinople, 1830-1834	
Visarion Puiu	student of KMA	Metropolitan bishop of the Romanian Orthodox Church	
Rafail Zaborovsky	student of KMA	Metropolitan of Kiev, Galychyna and All-Rus'	
Patriarch Adrian	student of KMC	Patriarch of Moscow and All Russia	

== Politics ==
=== Hetmans of Ukraine ===
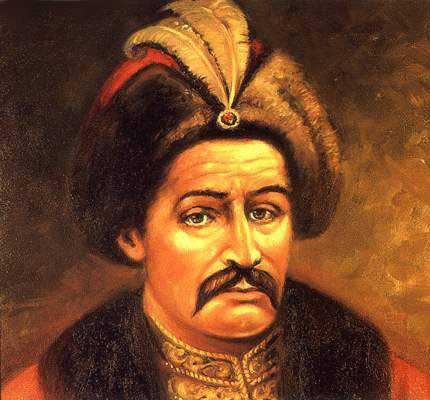
Ivan Mazepa, Grand Hetman

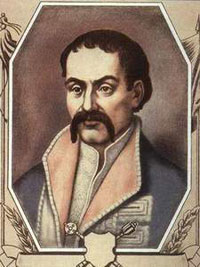
Pylyp Orlyk, Hetman in exile

Name	Relationship to the university	Notability	Reference
Ivan Mazepa	student of KMA	Grand Hetman of the Left-bank Ukraine, 1687–1708	
Pylyp Orlyk	student of KMA	Hetman in exile; author of one of the first state constitutions in Europe	
Pavlo Polubotok	student of KMA	Hetman of the Left-bank Ukraine, 1722-1724	
Ivan Samoylovych	student of KMA	Hetman of Left-bank Ukraine, 1672-1687	
Ivan Vyhovsky	student of KMA	Hetman of the Ukrainian Cossacks, 1657-1659	
Ivan Skoropadsky	student of KMA	Hetman of the Ukrainian Cossacks, 1708–1722	
Yurii Khmelnytsky	student of KMA	Hetman of Ukraine, 1659-1660 and 1678–1681	

=== Other prominent political figures ===
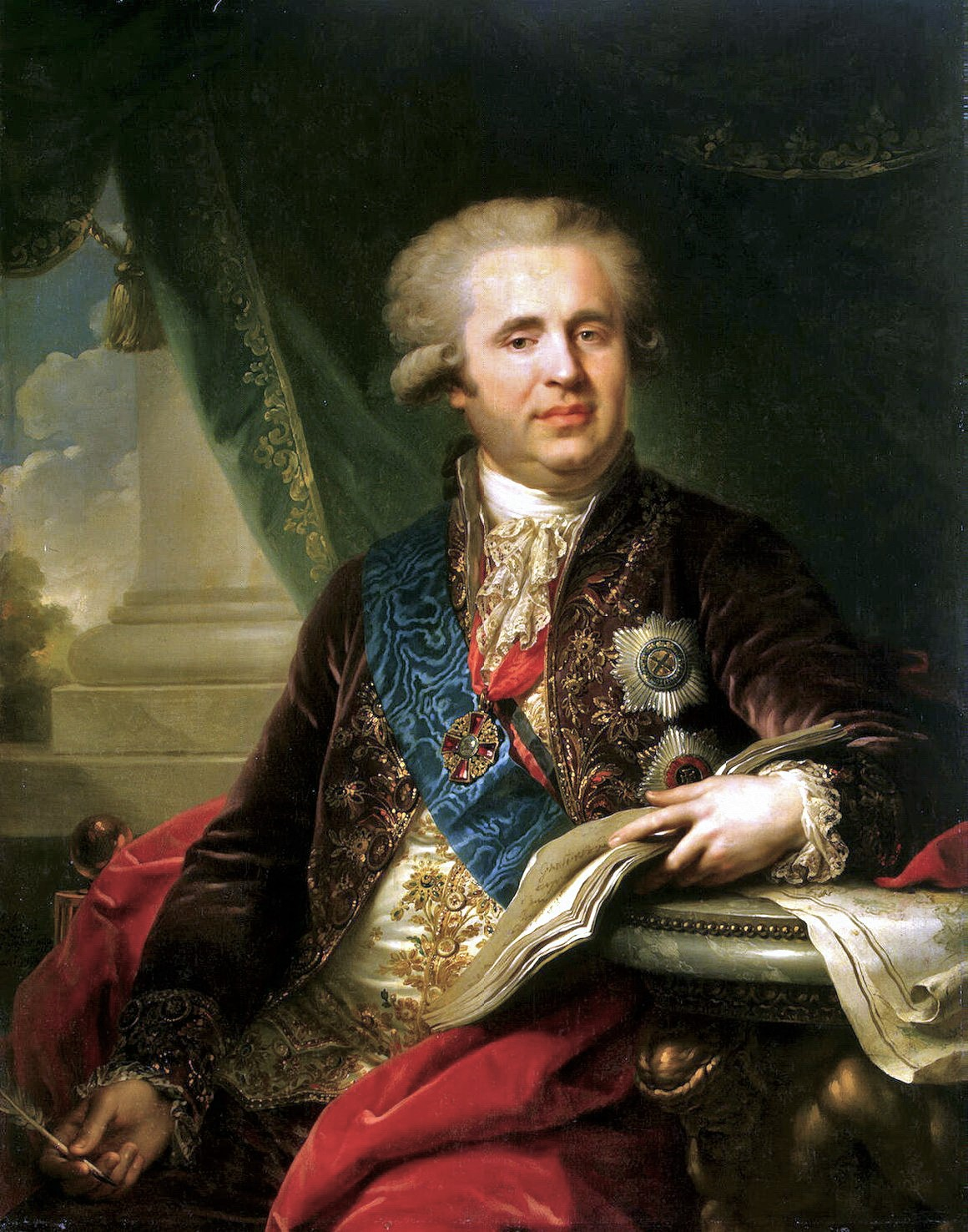
Alexander Bezborodko, Grand Chancellor of Russia

Name	Relationship to the university	Notability	Reference
Alexander Bezborodko	student of KMA	Grand Chancellor of Russia	
Dmytro Troshchynskyi	student of KMA	Minister of justice of Russia in 1814	
Antin Holovaty	student of KMA	Founder of the Black Sea Cossack Host	
Serhiy Kvit	professor of NaUKMA	Minister of Education and Science of Ukraine	
Oleksiy Pavlenko	student of KTU	Minister of Agriculture of Ukraine	
Serhiy Yefremov	student of KTU	Secretary of International Affairs for Ukraine	
Mykola Tomenko	professor of NaUKMA	Deputy of the Verkhovna Rada; Deputy Prime Minister of Ukraine in the first cabinet of Yulia Tymoshenko	
Ostap Semerak	student of NaUKMA	Member of the Verkhovna Rada of Ukraine of 6th convocation; Minister of the Cabinet of Ministers of Ukraine	
Andriy Shevchenko (politician)	student of NaUKMA	Deputy of the Verkhovna Rada of Ukraine	
Pavlo Sheremeta	professor of NaUKMA	Minister of Economical Development and Trade of Ukraine	
Iryna Vannykova	student of NaUKMA	Press secretary of the President of Ukraine Viktor Yuschenko	
Pyotr Zavadovsky	student of KMA	Minister of Education in Russia in 1802	

== Arts and music ==
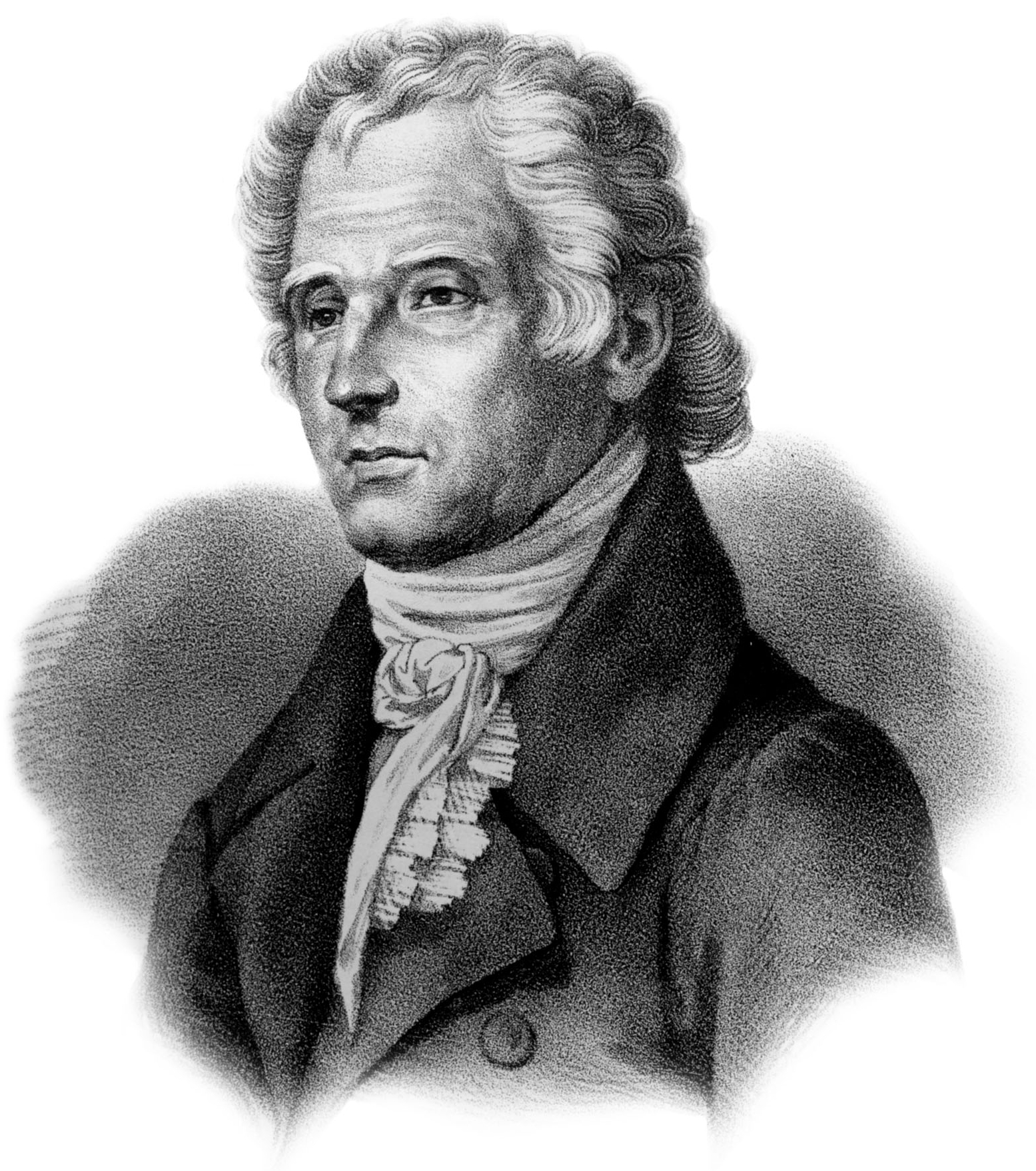
Dmytro Bortniansky, composer, conductor, and singer

Name	Relationship to the university	Notability	Reference
Ivan Hryhorovych-Barskyi	student of KMA	Architect who worked in the Ukrainian baroque style	
Maksym Berezovsky	student of KMA	Composer, opera singer and violinist	
Artemy Vedel	student of KMA	Composer, conductor, singer and violinist	
Dmytro Bortniansky	student of KMA	Composer, conductor, singer	
Dmitry Levitzky	student of KMA	Portrait painter	
Oleksander Koshyts	student of KTA	Composer, choral conductor, arranger	

== Literature ==
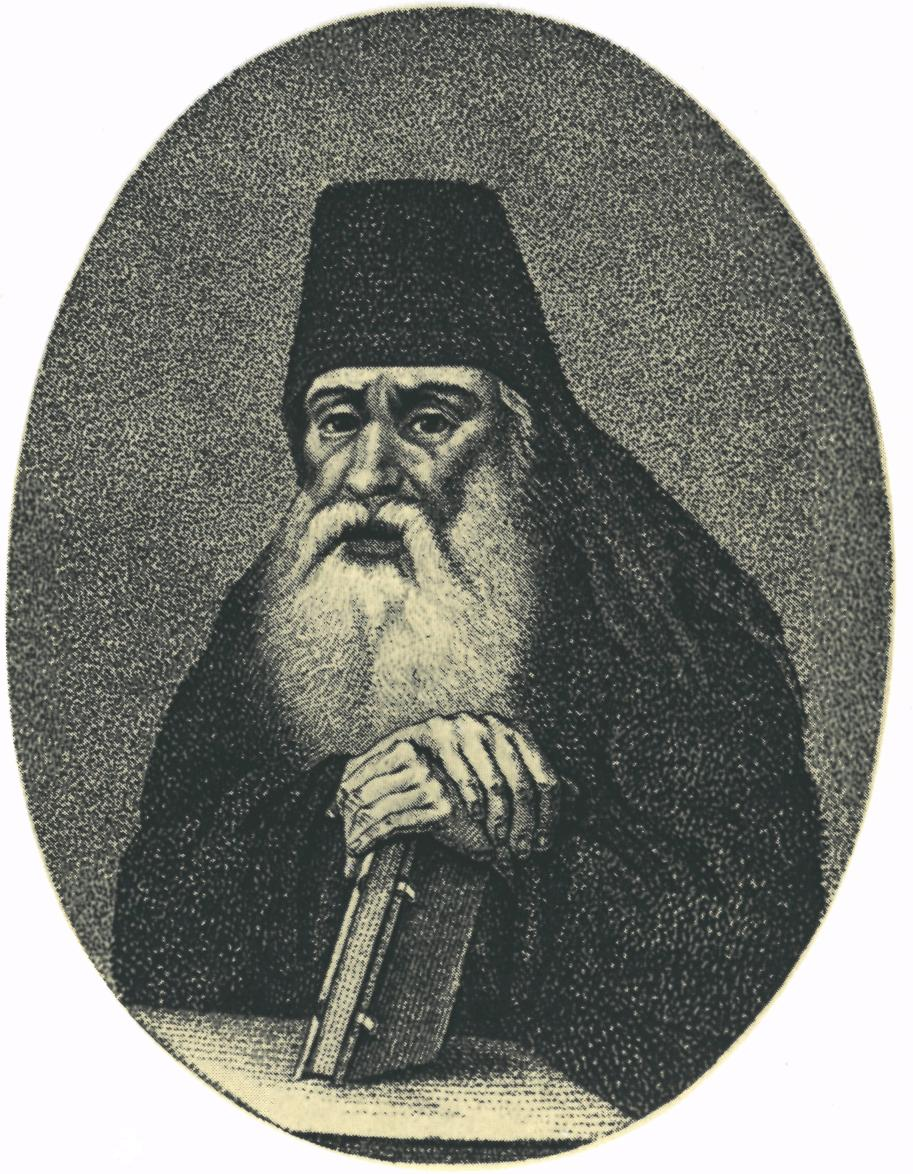
Symeon of Polotsk, poet, dramatist, and churchman

Name	Relationship to the university	Notability	Reference
Symeon of Polotsk	student of KMA	Belarusian-Russian poet, dramatist, churchman, and enlightener who laid the groundwork for the development of modern Russian literature	
Jovan Rajić	student of KMA	Serbian writer, historian and pedagogue	
Alexei Mateevici	student of KTA	Moldavian poet	
Maryna Sokolyan	student of NaUKMA	Contemporary writer	

== Natural sciences ==
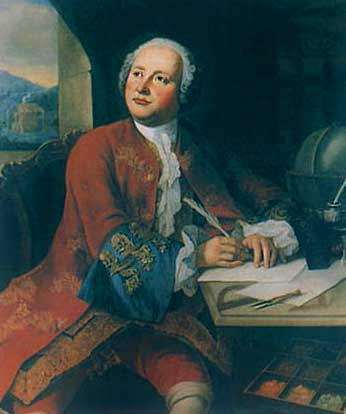
Mikhail Lomonosov, scientist, writer and polymath

Name	Relationship to the university	Notability	Reference
Mikhail Lomonosov	student of KMA	Russian scientist, writer and polymath	
Iryney Falkovskyi	student, rector of KMA	Mathematician, astronomer, historian, writer; bishop of Chyhyryn, Smolensk and Dorogobuzk	

== Humanities and social sciences ==
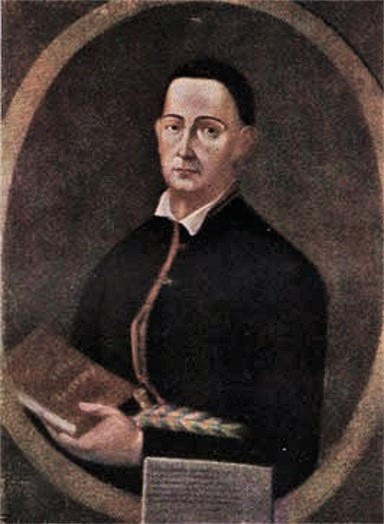
Hryhori Skovoroda, philosopher, poet and singer

Name	Relationship to the university	Notability	Reference
Meletius Smotrytsky	rector, professor of KBS	Linguist, writer; archbishop of Polotsk, Vitebsk and Mstislav	
Hryhori Skovoroda	student of KMA	Philosopher, poet and singer.	
Samiylo Velychko	student of KMA	Historian, author of the Cossack Chronicle	
Pamphil Yurkevych	student, professor of KTA	Philosopher.	
Innokentiy Gizel	rector, student of KMC	Historian	
James Mace	professor of NaUKMA	American historian and prominent researcher of Holodomor	
Maryna Tkachuk	dean, professor of NaUKMA	Historian of philosophy	
Olena Semeniaka	student of NaUKMA	political activist, academic and philosopher	
Nadia Parfan	student of NaUKMA	film director and creative producer	

== Other ==
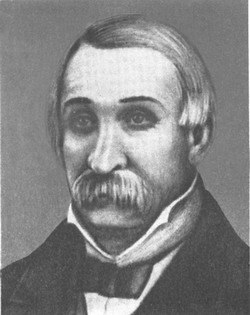
Petro Prokopovych, founder of commercial beekeeping

Name	Relationship to the university	Notability	Reference
Vyacheslav Bryukhovetskyi	president, professor of NaUKMA	Initiator of reestablishment; the first president of NaUKMA; Hero of Ukraine	
Petro Prokopovych	student of KMA	Founder of commercial beekeeping	
Dmytro Tarabakin	student of NaUKMA	Director, Head of Trading and Domestic Sales of Dragon Capital	

== Fictional people ==
Name	Relationship to the university	Notability	Reference
Andriy Bulba	NA	Character in Nikolai Gogol's Taras Bulba	
Ostap Bulba	NA	Character in Nikolai Gogol's Taras Bulba	
