= Vadym =

Vadym (Ukrainian: Вадим) is a Ukrainian given name. Its equivalents are Vadim (Russian) and Vadzim (Belarusian). Notable people with the name include:

- Vadym Antipov (born 1988), Ukrainian football striker
- Vadym Bolokhan (born 1986), professional Moldovan football defender
- Vadym Deonas (born 1975), professional Ukrainian football goalkeeper
- Vadym Gutzeit (born 1971), Olympic champion fencer and Ukraine's Youth and Sport Minister
- Vadym Hetman (1935–1998), Ukrainian statesman and banker
- Vadym Ishmakov (born 1979), Ukrainian footballer
- Vadym Kalmykov, Paralympian athlete from Ukraine
- Vadym Kharchenko (born 1975), Ukrainian football midfielder
- Vadym Kolesnik (born 2001), Ukrainian-born ice dancer
- Vadym Kyrylov (born 1981), Ukrainian football striker
- Vadym Meller (1884–1962), Ukrainian-Russian Soviet painter, theatrical designer, book illustrator and architect
- Vadym Melnyk (born 1980), professional Ukrainian football defender
- Vadym Milko (born 1986), professional Ukrainian football midfielder
- Vadym Panas (born 1985), professional Ukrainian football midfielder
- Vadym Rybalchenko (born 1988), professional Ukrainian football midfielder
- Vadym Sapay (born 1986), professional Ukrainian football midfielder
- Vadym Sosnykhin (1942–2003), Ukrainian Soviet football player
- Vadym Tyshchenko (born 1963), retired Soviet and Ukrainian football player and current football coach
- Vadym Voroshylov (born 1994), Ukrainian fighter pilot
- Vadym Yevtushenko (born 1958), former Ukrainian footballer
