= Khrystyna =

Khrystyna (Ukrainian: Христина) is a Ukrainian feminine given name. Notable people with the name include:

- Khrystyna Alchevska, Ukrainian teacher and a prominent activist for national education in Imperial Russia.
- Khrystyna Antoniichuk, former professional tennis player from Ukraine.
- Khrystyna Dmytrenko, Ukrainian biathlete.
- Khrystyna Kots-Hotlib, Ukrainian singer and beauty pageant.
- Khrystyna Mykhailichenko, Ukrainian pianist
- Khrystyna Pohranychna, Ukrainian individual rhythmic gymnast.
- Khrystyna Soloviy, Ukrainian-Lemko folk singer.
- Khrystyna Stoloka, Ukrainian model and beauty pageant.
- Khrystyna Stuy, Ukrainian sprint athlete.
- Khrystyna Yaroshenko, Ukrainian film producer, editor, and director in New York City.
