= Zoya =

Zoya (Russian: Зоя) is a feminine Russian, Ukrainian, Belarusian, and Bulgarian first name, a form of Zoe, meaning "life", from Greek ζωή (zoē), "life".

== People ==
- Zoya (singer) (born 1993), American singer
- Zoya Afroz (born 1994), Indian actress and model
- Zoya Akhtar (born 1972), Indian film director and screenwriter
- Zoya Barantsevich (1896–1952), Russian actress
- Zoya Boguslavskaya (1924–2026), Soviet and Russian poet and writer
- Zoya Buryak (born 1966), Russian actress
- Zoya Cherkassky-Nnadi (born 1976), Israeli artist
- Zoya Fyodorova (1909–1981), Russian actress
- Zoya Hussain (born 1990), Indian actress, writer and director
- Zoya Ivanova (born 1952), long-distance runner from Kazakhstan
- Zoya Klyuchko (1933–2016), Ukrainian entomologist
- Zoya Kornilova (1939–2025), Russian politician
- Zoya Kosmodemyanskaya (1923–1941), Soviet partisan, Hero of the Soviet Union
- Zoya Krakhmalnikova (1929–2008), Russian Christian writer, activist and Soviet dissident
- Zoya Krasnova (1938–2014), Russian plant operator
- Zoya Krylova (1944–2017), Russian journalist and politician
- Zoya Mironova (1913–2008), Russian speed skater and surgeon
- Zoya Nasir (born 1990), Pakistani television actress and beautician
- Zoya Phan (born 1980), political activist for the Karen people of Burma currently living in the UK
- Zoya Pirzad (born 1952), renowned Iranian-Armenian writer and novelist
- Zoya Schleining (born 1961), German chess player
- Zoya Semenduyeva (1929–2020), Soviet and Israeli poet
- Zoya Smirnow (1897–??), survivor of a corp of twelve Russian girls who disguised themselves as boys to join the army
- Zoya Spasovkhodskaya (born 1949), Soviet heptathlete
- Zoya Svetova (born 1959), Russian journalist and author
- Zoya Voskresenskaya (1907–1992), Soviet diplomat and author

== Surname ==
- Shaalin Zoya (born 1997), Indian actress, dancer and anchor

== Fiction ==
- Zoya (1944 film), a Soviet film
- Zoya (2020 film), a Russian film
- Zoya (novel), a 1988 novel by Danielle Steel
  - Zoya (1995 film), a 1995 TV film based on the novel with Melissa Gilbert
- Zoya, a nurse and doctor in training in Aleksandr Solzhenitsyn's 1966 novel Cancer Ward
- Zoya (YRF Spy Universe), a fictional character in Indian films, portrayed by Katrina Kaif
- Zoya Farooqui, a character on the Indian soap opera Qubool Hai
- Zoya Lott, a character in the TV series Gossip Girl
- Zoya Nazyalensky, a character in Leigh Bardugo's Grishaverse novels; see King of Scars
- Zoya Qureshi, a character in the Indian movie Ishaqzaade
- Zoya Riaz, a character played by actress Tripti Dimri in the Indian movie Animal
- Zoya Siddiqui, the female protagonist of the Hindi-language TV series Bepannah
- Zoya Singh Solanki, the titular character of the Indian movie The Zoya Factor
- Zoya the Destroya, alter ego of Ruth Wilder, a fictional wrestler in the TV series GLOW
- Zoya the Thief, a main character in the video game Trine
- Zoya Ivanovna, a character in the TV series Tom Clancy's Jack Ryan

== Other uses ==
- Zöyä, the Tatar name of the village of Sviyazhsk
- 1793 Zoya, an asteroid named after Zoya Kosmodemyanskaya

== See also ==
- Zoe (name)
- Zoia
