= Vadim =

Slavic masculine given name

- Gender: Male

Origin
- Origin: Slavic
- Region of origin: Eastern Europe

Other names
- Variant forms: Vadik, Vadya

Vadim (Cyrillic: Вадим) is a Slavic masculine given name derived from the Ruthenian word vaditi (Russian: вадити), meaning to blame or as a diminutive of Vadimir. Ukrainian language: Vadym; Belarusian language: Vadzim. Notable people with the name include:

== Mononymic ==
- Vadim the Bold, legendary chieftain
- DJ Vadim, Russian-English DJ and record producer

== Other ==
- Vadim Abdrashitov (1945–2023), Russian film director
- Vadim Alekseyev (born 1970), Soviet-Israeli swimmer
- Vadim Antonov (born 1965), Russian-American software engineer and entrepreneur
- Vadim Bakatin (1937–2022), former Soviet politician
- Vadim Belyaev, Russian banker
- Vadim Boreț (born 1976), Moldovan football manager and former player
- Vadim Cemîrtan (born 1987), Moldovan footballer
- Vadim Cobîlaș (born 1983), Moldovan rugby union player
- Vadim Crîcimari (born 1988), Moldovan footballer
- Vadim Devyatovskiy (born 1977), Belarusian hammer thrower
- Vadim Evseev (born 1976), Russian soccer player
- Vadim Garbuzov (born 1987), Austrian dancer
- Vadym Gutzeit (born 1971), Ukrainian Olympic champion sabre fencer
- Vadim Jean (born 1963), British film director
- Vadim Khamuttskikh (born 1969), Russian volleyball player
- Vadim Khomitsky (born 1982), Russian ice hockey player
- Vadim Krasnoselsky (born 1970), Transnistrian politician
- Vadim Krasnoslobodtsev (born 1983), Kazakhstani ice hockey player
- Vadim Mogilnitsky (1935–2012), Russian mathematics teacher, musicologist, translator and poet
- Vadim Muntagirov (born 1990), Russian ballet dancer, principal dancer of The Royal Ballet in London
- Vadim Naumov (1969–2025), Russian pair skater
- Vadim Perelman (born 1963), Russo-American director and producer
- Vadim Petrov (1932–2020), Czech music educator
- Vadim Pirogan (1921–2007), Bessarabian activist and author
- Vadim Rață (born 1993), Moldovan footballer
- Vadim Repin (born 1971), Russian violinist
- Vadim Sashurin (born 1970), Belarusian biathlete
- Vadim Shipachyov (born 1987), Russian ice hockey player
- Vadim Tikunov (1921–1980), Soviet politician
- Vadim Tudor (1949–2015), Romanian politician
- Wadim Tyszkiewicz (born 1958), Polish politician, born in Belarus
- Vadims Vasiļevskis (born 1982), Latvian athlete
- Vadim Yefremovich (1903–1989), Soviet mathematician
- Vadim Yusov (1929–2013), Soviet and Russian cinematographer
- Vadim Shishimarin (born 2000), Russian war criminal
