= Zooey =

- Pronunciation: /ˈzoʊi/ ZOH-ee, /ˈzuːi/ ZOO-ee
- Gender: Both

Origin
- Languages: 1. Hebrew; 2. Greek
- Derivation: 1. Zechariah; 2. Zoe
- Meaning: 1. "God has remembered" 2. "life"

Other names
- Related names: Zechariah, Zoe, Joe, Joey

Zooey is a given name. Those bearing the name include:

- Zooey Deschanel, an American actress and singer named after the Salinger novel. (She pronounces it as "Zoë.")
- Zooey Perry, British handballer
- Zooey Zephyr, American politician

== In fiction ==
- Zooey Glass, male Jewish-Irish character in Franny and Zooey and other parts of the Glass family narrative of J. D. Salinger
- Zooey, truck (anthropomorphized as female child) in Bigfoot Presents: Meteor and the Mighty Monster Trucks
- Princess Zooey, a character in Sofia the First
- Zooey, an anthropomorphic fox in Sonic Boom (TV series)

== See also ==
- Zoe (name)
