= Vadzim =

- Gender: Male
- Language: Belarusian
- Name day: April 10, April 22.

Origin
- Origin: See Vadim
- Region of origin: Belarus

Other names
- Variant forms: Vadzik, Vadzia, Vadziuša, Vadziuś

Vadzim (Belarusian: Вадзім) is a Belarusian masculine given name, an equivalent of Russian Vadim and Ukrainian Vadym.

Notable people with the name include:

- Vadzim Boyka (born 1978), Belarusian footballer
- Vadzim Dzemidovich (born 1985), Belarusian footballer
- Vadzim Lasowski (born 1975), Belarusian retired footballer
- Vadzim Makhneu (born 1979), Belarusian canoer
- Vadzim Mazanik, Belarusian welterweight champion in men's Thai-Boxing at the W.A.K.O. European Championships 2004 (Budva)
- Vadzim Mytnik (born 1988), Belarusian footballer
- Vadzim Yerchyk (born 1991), Belarusian footballer
