= Vadim Mogilnitsky =

Vadim Anatolyevich Moghilnitsky Вадим Анатольевич Могильницкий
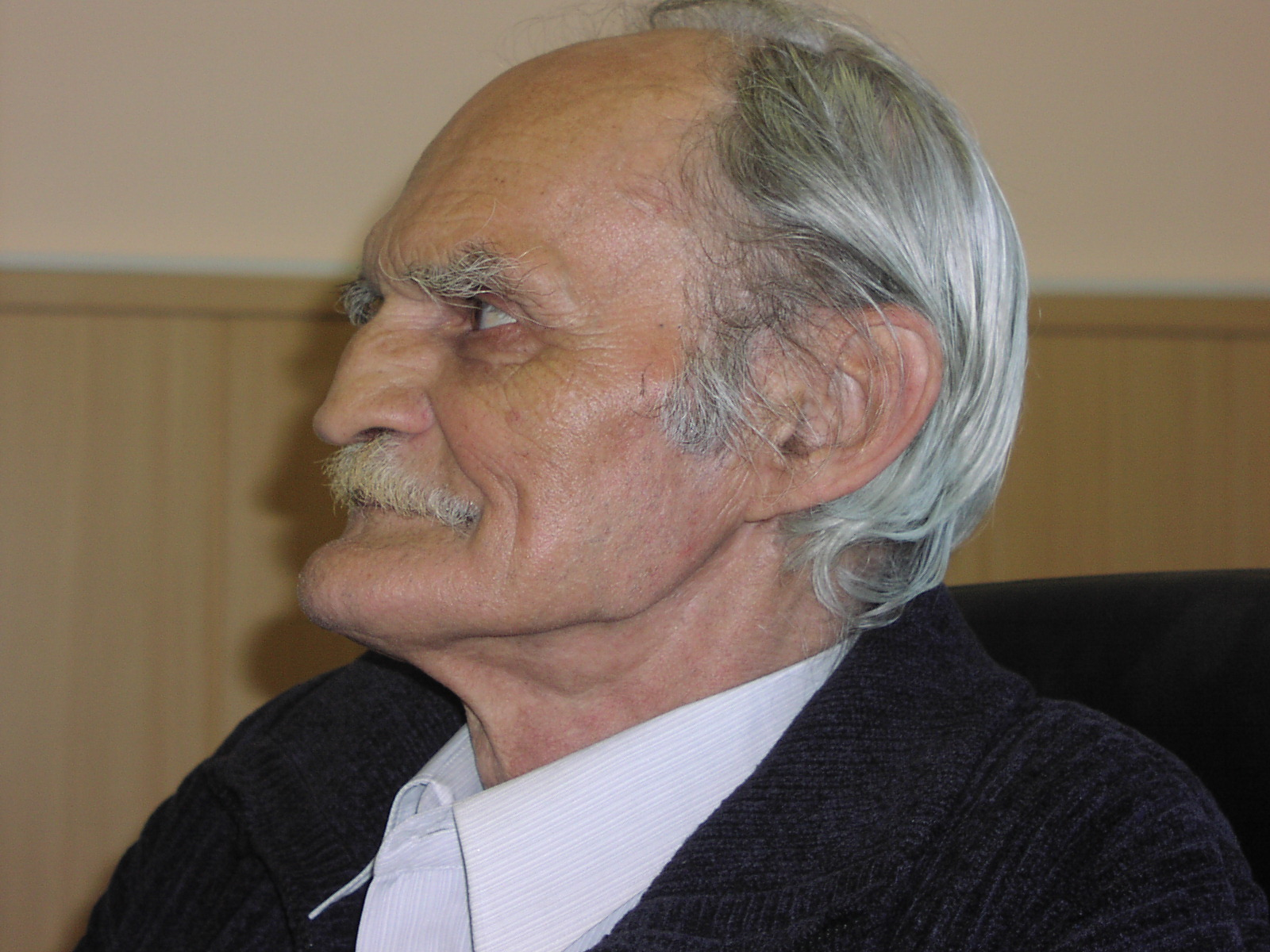
- Born: 21 September 1935 Odessa, Ukrainian Soviet Socialist Republic
- Died: 3 December 2012 (aged 77) Chelyabinsk, Russia

Vadim Anatolyevich Moghilnitsky (Russian: Вади́м Анато́льевич Могильни́цкий; 21 September 1935, Odessa — 3 August 2012, Chelyabinsk) — mathematics teacher, musicologist, translator, poet. The author of the first Russian biography of Russian pianist Sviatoslav Richter. Sister - Moghilnitskaya Galina Anatolyevna, Ukrainian pedagog, publicist and poet.

Vadim Moghilnitsky was born in Odessa in the family of mathematics teachers Anatoly Alexandrovich Moghilnitsky and Asya Ivanovna Zvintarnaya. Graduated from Odessa University. Since 1965 lived in Chelyabinsk where he taught mathematics in South Ural State University.

Vadim Moghilnitsky is the author of two books about Sviatoslav Richter: "Richter" (first Russian biography of the pianist, 2000) and "Richter-ensemblist" (2012). Also Vadim Moghilnitsky is the translator of Vladislav Dulemba's "Chopin", the biography of Chopin (from Polish into Russian, 2001).

Vadim Moghilnitsky is the author of more than 200 pieces of poetry in Russian and Ukrainian languages. In 2015 the collection of selected poetry by Vadim Moghilnitsky was published: "Бессонные пути" ("Sleepless paths").

== Bibliography ==
Mathematics books

- В.И. Заляпин, Ю.Г. Малиновский, В.А. Могильницкий. МАТЕМАТИКА. В помощь поступающим., Челябинск, Изд. Татьяны Лурье, 2000, 320с.
- В.И. Заляпин, Ю.Г. Малиновский, В.А. Могильницкий. Компьютерное тестирование., Челябинск, Изд. ВЕРСИЯ, 1997, 64с.
- В.А. Могильницкий. Введение в анализ. Учебное пособие, ч.1(1999)Б –100с., ч.2(1997), 75с., Изд. ЮУрГУ
- В.А. Могильницкий. Элементы комплексного анализа : Учеб. пособие . Челябинск, ЧПИ им. Ленинского комсомола, 1989, 100с.

Musicology

- Вадим Могильницкий. Святослав Рихтер. — Урал LTD, 2000. — ISBN 5-86884-088-7
- Вадим Могильницкий. Шопен. — Урал LTD, 2001. — ISBN 5-8029-0156-X
- Вадим Могильницкий. Рихтер-ансамблист. — Издательский дом Игоря Розина, 2012. — ISBN 978-5-903966-18-9

Poetry

- Вадим Могильницкий. Бессонные пути. — Издательский дом Игоря Розина, 2015 — ISBN 978-5-903966-47-9

== Links ==
- Страница, посвященная Вадиму Могильницкому, на сайте издательства Игоря Розина
- "Абрам Давидович Кацман - ученый, педагог, человек", Заляпин, В. И.
- "Поэзия и проза лучшего на свете ремесла" (Журнал "Юность" №7, 1963)
- Айвар Валеев - "Математик написал книгу о музыканте" (Журнал "Эксперт Урал" №6 (6), 2000)
- Лидия Панфилова - "Могильницкий написал книгу о музыканте Рихтере" (газета "Челябинский рабочий" от 19 апреля 2000)
- Анна Соболева - "Ломка критических стульев" (рецензия на книгу Вадима Могильницкого "Святослав Рихтер")
