= Theopompus (disambiguation) =

Theopompus is the name of:

- Theopompus, 4th century BC Greek historian
- Theopompus (king of Sparta), 7th–8th century BC Spartan king
- Theopompus (comic poet), 5th century BC comic poet
