= Yakhno =

Yakhno (Ukrainian: Яхно), also transliterated Jachno, is a Ukrainian surname. Notable people with the surname include:

- Andrew Jachno (born 1962), Australian race walker
- Denis Yakhno (born 1992), Belarusian footballer
- Maksym Yakhno (born 1988), Ukrainian footballer
- Yelyzaveta Yakhno (born 1998), Ukrainian synchronised swimmer
