= Zoia =

Zoia is both a given name and a surname. It is a variation of the name Zoe (name). Notable people with the name include:

== Given name ==
- Zoia Ceaușescu (1949–2006), Romanian mathematician
- Zoia Duriagina (born 1950), Ukrainian scientist
- Zoia Gaidai (1902–1965), Soviet Ukrainian opera soprano
- Zoia Horn (1918–2014), American librarian
- Zoia Korvin-Krukovsky (1903–1999), Russian-Swedish artist
- Zoia Ovsii (born 1994), Ukrainian Paralympic athlete
- Zoia Skoropadenko (born 1978), Ukrainian contemporary mixed-media artist

== Surname ==
- Clyde Zoia (1896–1955), American football player
- Luigi Zoia (born 1948), Italian karateka
