= Tina Niewiadomski =

Ukrainian film producer, editor and directdor

Tina (Khrystyna) Niewiadomski
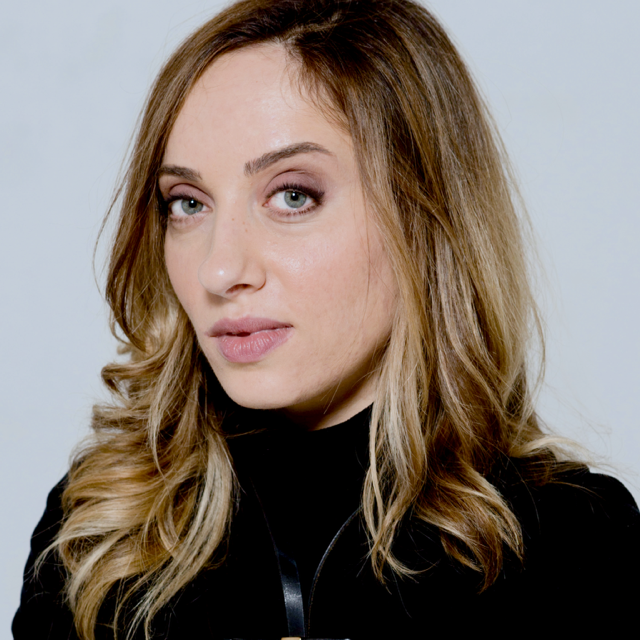
- Born: Khrystyna Iaroshenko; 18 May 1985 (age 41); Kherson, Ukraine
- Education: Kyiv National I. K. Karpenko-Kary Theatre, Cinema and Television University
- Website: www.tinanrosh.com

Tina (Khrystyna) Niewiadomski (Ukrainian: Христина Ярошенко, born May 18, 1985), also credited as Tina Rosh, is a Ukrainian film producer, editor, and director in New York City. She is a member of the Alliance of Women Directors and the New York Women in Film & Television.

== Early life ==
Niewiadomski was born on May 18, 1985, in Kherson, Ukraine. At a young age, her father was her main influence in developing an interest in film. At the age of 12, she began working to save money for film school. She moved to Kyiv, Ukraine to study at Kyiv National I. K. Karpenko-Kary Theatre, Cinema and Television University where she earned a master's degree with honors in Film and Television.

== Film career ==
Ukraine

Niewiadomski started her career in Ukraine by creating a 10 part documentary series called "My Truth". In 2005, she won "Best Full Length Script" for her screenplay Born in Fire by Koronatsiya Slova (Коронація слова), an international literacy competition of novels, screenplays, and plays. In 2007, she received an award from Inter-Channel in Ukraine for TV Fishka. She later worked as Director of Video Production on Miss Universe Ukraine. She was also involved with Ukrainian television network Novy TV (Star Light Media), where she served as director of Star Factory 4 and later worked as co-creator and director on television projects including Piranhas, Abzac, and Project Perfect. She is a Notable Alumni of Kyiv National University of Theatre, Cinema and Television.

United States

Niewiadomski’s short film Some Others (2013), for which she served as writer, director, and producer, received the Best Short Film award at the International New Jersey Film Festival in 2014. Later that year, she relocated to the United States and began pursuing a career in the fashion industry.

From 2016 to 2018, she worked as a lead editor on the PBS television series Start Up, a documentary series created by Gary Bredow. Between February 2017 and September 2019, she served as Head of Video at Cools.com, where she produced and directed branded and editorial video content for fashion and beauty brands. During this period, she also contributed to fashion-related productions, including editing content for New York Fashion Week and working on projects involving brands such as Lacoste and Coach.

In 2019, she edited the short film Warrior, followed by her work as editor on the short film Outlaws in 2020. In 2026, she is credited as writer, director, and producer of the short film Aquatic.

From February 2022 - July 2025, she worked as a senior creative marketing producer at WFAA, a television station owned by TEGNA. Her work has been associated with regional Emmy Award nominations, including at the Lone Star Emmy Awards, and she received a PROMAX Silver award for a WFAA brand video in 2023.

== Filmography ==
| Year | Title | Role |
|---|---|---|
| 2013 | Some Others (Short) | Writer, director, and producer |
| 2016–2017 | Start Up (TV Series) | Editor |
| 2019 | Warrior (Short) | Editor |
| 2020 | Outlaws (Short) Editor | Editor |
| 2026 | Aquatic (Short) | Writer, director and producer |

== Awards and honors ==
- "Best Short Film" at the International New Jersey Film Festival Spring 2014 for her short Some Others.
- "Best Script of the Year" by Inter-Channel in Ukraine in 2007 for "TV Fishka".
- "Best Full Length Script" by Koronatsiya Slova (Коронація слова) in 2005 for her screenplay "Born in Fire".
