= Yasko =

Yasko or Jasko (Cyrillic: Ясько) is a gender-neutral Slavic surname that may refer to the following notable people:

- Brett Yasko, American graphic designer
- Tomáš Jasko (born 1983), Slovak ice hockey player
- Yelyzaveta Yasko (born 1990), Ukrainian politician and film producer
- Daria Yasko (born 2008), Russian model
