= Valentyn =

Valentyn (Ukrainian: Валентин) is a given name. Notable people with the name include:

- Valentyn Demyanenko (born 1983), Ukrainian sprint canoeist
- Valentyn Grekov (born 1976), Ukrainian judoka
- Valentyn Kravchuk (1944–2003), Ukrainian rower
- Valentyn Koronevsky (born 1950), Ukrainian economist and politician
- Valentyn Poltavets (born 1968), Ukrainian football midfielder
- Valentyn Rechmedin (1916–1986) Ukrainian journalist and writer
- Valentyn Slyusar (born 1977), Ukrainian football midfielder
- Valentyn Symonenko (born 1940), Ukrainian statesman

As a family name, it may refer to:

- François Valentyn (born 1666), Dutch minister, naturalist and author
