= Febronia =

Febronia is a feminine given name. It may refer to:

- Febronia of Nisibis (284–304), ancient Roman Christian nun, martyr and saint
- Febronia of Syria (died 749), nun, monastery heady, martyr and Coptic Orthodox saint
- a character in the Xenosaga series

== See also ==
- Fevronia of Murom (c. 1175–1228), princess consort of the Principality of Murom and Eastern Ortodox saint and wonderworker
