= Zoe (name) =

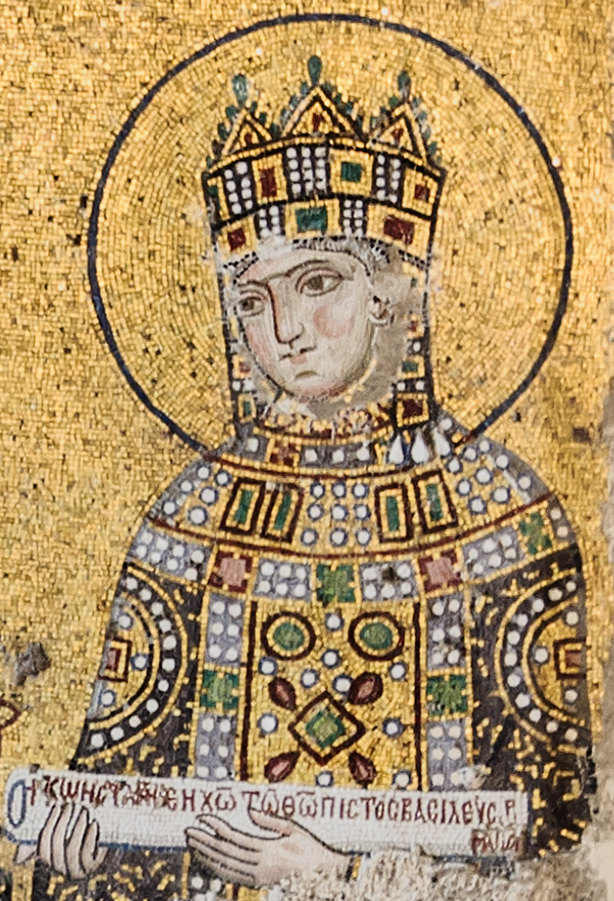
- A mosaic of the Empress Zoë Porphyrogenita in the Hagia Sophia.
- Pronunciation: /ˈzoʊ.i/ ZOH-ee; /ˈzoʊ/ ZOH
- Gender: female (rarely male)

Origin
- Language: Greek
- Meaning: "life"

Other names
- Variant forms: Zoë, Zoey, Zoí, Zoé, Zoie, Zoee, Zoi, Zoh, Zoya, Zoia, Zoja
- Related names: Zooey

Zoe is a feminine first name of Greek origin, meaning "life."

== Popularity ==
Zoe is a popular name for girls in many countries, ranking among the top 100 names for girls born in the United States since 2000. It is also well used in other English-speaking countries including Australia, Canada, Ireland, New Zealand, and the United Kingdom, as well as in other countries including Argentina, Belgium, Czech Republic, France, Hungary, Italy, Mexico, Netherlands, Spain, and Switzerland. In 2022, Zoe was the 20th most popular name given to girls in Canada, while Zoey was 42nd.

The name holds religious significance for Jews and Christians. Hellenized Jews used the name to refer to Eve, as both names have similar meanings, and there are Christian martyrs with the name.

== Variations ==
- Belarusian – Zoya
- Catalan – Zoè
- Croatian – Zoja
- Dutch – Zoë
- English – Zoe, Zoey, Zoie, Zowie
- French – Zoé
- German – Zoe
- Greek – Zoi (Greek: ζωή)
- Hungarian – Zoé
- Ukraine – Zoia (Ukrainian: Зоя)

== People ==
=== Historical ===
- Zoe Porphyrogenita (c. 978–1050), Byzantine empress
- Exuperius and Zoe, saints, martyrs (died 127)
- Zoe of Rome (died c. 286), martyred saint
- Zoe Karbonopsina (died c. 920), Byzantine empress
- Zoe Palaiologina (c. 1455–1503), wife of Tsar Ivan III of Russia
- Zoé Talon, comtesse du Cayla (1785–1852), intimate friend and confidante of Louis XVIII

=== Contemporary ===
==== Arts and entertainment ====
- Gorilla Zoe, American rapper
- Zoë (Austrian singer) (Zoë Straub) (born 1996), Austrian singer, songwriter, and actress
- Zoë (British singer) (Zoë Pollock; born 1969), English pop star
- Zoe Akins (1886–1958), American playwright, poet and author
- Zoë Avril (born 1980), French singer
- Zoë Baird (born 1952), American lawyer, Attorney General nominee in 1993
- Zoë Ball (born 1970), English television and radio personality
- Zoë Bell (born 1978), New Zealand stuntwoman and actress
- Zoe Beloff (born 1958), New York-based artist
- Zoe Bertram, Australian actress
- Zoe Birkett (born 1985), English singer
- Zoe Boyle (born 1989), English actress
- Zoe Brough (born 2003), English actress
- Zoe Caldwell (1933–2020), Australian actress
- Zoe Cassavetes (born 1970), American director, screenwriter and actress
- Zoë Chao (born 1985), American actress and screenwriter
- Zoe Colletti (born 2001), American actress
- Zooey Deschanel (born 1980), American actress and musician
- Zoey Deutch (born 1994), American actress and producer
- Zoé Félix (born 1976), French actress
- Zoe Gotusso (born 1997), Argentine musician
- Zoë Heller (born 1965), English journalist and novelist
- Zoë Howe (born 1979), English music writer
- Zoe Kazan (born 1983), American actress
- Zoë Keating (born 1972), Canadian-American cellist and composer
- Zoë Kravitz (born 1988), American actress, singer and model
- Zoe Laskari (1942–2017), Greek actress
- Zoe Latta, American fashion designer
- Zoë Lister (born 1982), English actress
- Zöe Lucker (born 1974), English actress
- Zoë Lund (1962–1999), American entertainer
- Zoe Lyons (born 1971), British comedian
- Zoe McLellan (born 1974), American actress
- Zoë Më (born 2000), Swiss singer-songwriter
- Zoë Nathenson (born 1969), British actress
- Zoe Naylor (born 1977), Australian actress
- Zoie Palmer (born 1977), Canadian actress
- Zoë Pastelle (born 1999), Swiss actress
- Zoe Kincaid Penlington (1878–1944), Canadian-American expert on kabuki
- Zoë Poledouris (born 1973), American actress and film composer
- Zoe Saldaña (born 1978), American actress
- Zoe Salmon (born 1980), Northern Irish television presenter
- Zoë Straub (born 1996), Austrian singer, songwriter, and actress
- Zoe Strauss (born 1970), American photographer
- Zoe Sugg (born 1990), English beauty blogger and vlogger
- Zoie Tam (born 1981), Hong Kong actress, singer and television presenter
- Zoë Tapper (born 1981), English actress
- Zoe Tay (born 1968), Singaporean actress
- Zoé Valdés (born 1959), Cuban writer
- Zoe Ventoura (born 1981), Australian actress
- Zoe Verbiceanu (1893–1975), Romanian playwright and translator
- Zoe Viccaji (born 1983), Pakistani singer
- Zoë Wanamaker (born 1949), American-born English actress
- Zoe Wees (born 2002), German singer
- Zoe Weizenbaum (born 1991), American former actress
- Zoe Williams (writer) (born 1973), British journalist
- Zoe Wiseman (born 1970), American photographer and model

==== Sports ====
- Zoé Allaire-Bourgie (born 2004), Canadian artistic gymnast
- Zoe Boyd (born 2000), Canadian ice hockey player
- Zoe Díaz (born 2006), Argentine field hockey player
- Zoi Dimoschaki (born 1985), Greek freestyle swimmer
- Zoi Fitsiou (born 1995), Greek rower
- Zoe Florescu Potolea (born 2008), Romanian and American racing driver
- Zoe Goss (born 1968), Australian cricket player
- Zoe Hobbs (born 1997), New Zealand sprinter
- Zoey Clark (born 1994), British sprinter
- Zoi Sadowski-Synnott (born 2001), New Zealand snowboarder
- Zoe Tynan (1998–2016), English footballer
- Zoe Uens (born 2003), Canadian ice hockey player
- Zoe Voris (born 1998), American wheelchair basketball player

==== Others ====
- Zoe Adjonyoh (born 1977), British writer and cook
- Zoe Cameron (born 1960), British politician
- Zoe G. Cardon, American ecosystems ecologist
- Zoe Daniel (born 1972), Australian journalist
- Zoé de Gamond (1806–1854), Belgian educator and feminist
- Zoe Dumitrescu-Bușulenga (1920–2006), Romanian literary historian
- Zöe Franklin (born 1981), British politician
- Zoé Genot, Belgian politician (Ecolo)
- Zoe Hauptová (1929–2012), Czech slavicist and chief editor of the Old Church Slavonic Dictionary
- Zoé Jiménez Corretjer, Puerto Rican writer, professor at the University of Puerto Rico
- Zoe Konstantopoulou (born 1976), Greek politician
- Zoé Laurier (1842–1921), the wife of Sir Wilfrid Laurier, the seventh Prime Minister of Canada
- Zoé Oldenbourg (1916–2002), Russian-born French historian and novelist
- Zoe Rosenberg (born 2002), American animal rights activist and animal sanctuary founder
- Zoe Rosinach Pedrol (1894–1973), Catalan pharmacist and the first Spanish woman to earn a doctorate in Pharmacy
- Zoe Royer, a Canadian politician
- Zoe Sarnacki (died 2009), American murder victim
- Zoe Shabarova (1925–1999), Russian chemist
- Zoé Valdés (born 1959), Cuban writer
- Zoë Wicomb (1948–2025), South African-Scottish author and academic
- Zoey Williams, Canadian commercial pilot
- Zoey Zane (aka Emily Sander; 1989–2007), American student, murder victim

== Surname ==
- John Zoe, Tli Cho statesman
- Rachel Zoe, American fashion designer

== Fictional characters ==
- Zoe, from Alvin and the Chipmunks: Chipwrecked
- Zoe, a character in Sesame Street
- Zoe Anderson, from British soap opera Hollyoaks
- Zoey Bartlet, youngest daughter of President Bartlet on the TV series The West Wing
- Zoe Benson, a young witch enrolled in the Academy for Exceptional Young Ladies, American Horror Story: Coven
- Zoë Boutin Perry, protagonist and narrator of John Scalzi's novel Zoe's Tale
- Zoey Brooks, main character on Zoey 101
- Zoe Carpenter, from British soap opera Hollyoaks
- Zoe Carter, from the TV show Eureka
- Zoë Castillo, the primary protagonist of a computer game Dreamfall: The Longest Journey
- Zoe Drake, from the Dinosaur King franchise
- Zoey Hanson, Ichigo Momomiya's English dub name in Tokyo Mew Mew (Mew Mew Power)
- Zoe Heriot, companion of the Second Doctor from Doctor Who
- Zoey Howzer, character from The Proud Family
- Zoey Johnson, character in Black-ish and protagonist in Grown-ish
- Zoe Landau, ex-wife of lead character Cal Lightman on television series Lie to Me
- Zoe Luper, from the soap opera All My Children
- Zoe MacPherson, from the Baby Blues comic strip and TV adaption
- Zoe Newton, from soap opera EastEnders
- Zoey Pierson, from How I Met Your Mother
- Zoe Reynolds, from Spooks (MI-5 in the USA)
- Zoe Ramos, a character from the Ghost Whisperer
- Zoe Slater, main character from soap opera EastEnders
- Zoey Stevens, main protagonist of the 2014 Disney Channel film Zapped
- Zoe Trent, from Littlest Pet Shop
- Zoe Valentine, title character in the Brat web series of the same name
- Zoe Washburne, from the Firefly TV series
- Zoe Zebra, a character from the preschool show Peppa Pig
- Zoey, from KPop Demon Hunters
- Zoey, from Santa Hunters
- Zoey, from Zombies

== See also ==
- Zoia
- Zoey
- Zooey
- Zoya
