= Andrii Baumeister =

Ukrainian philosopher (born 1970)

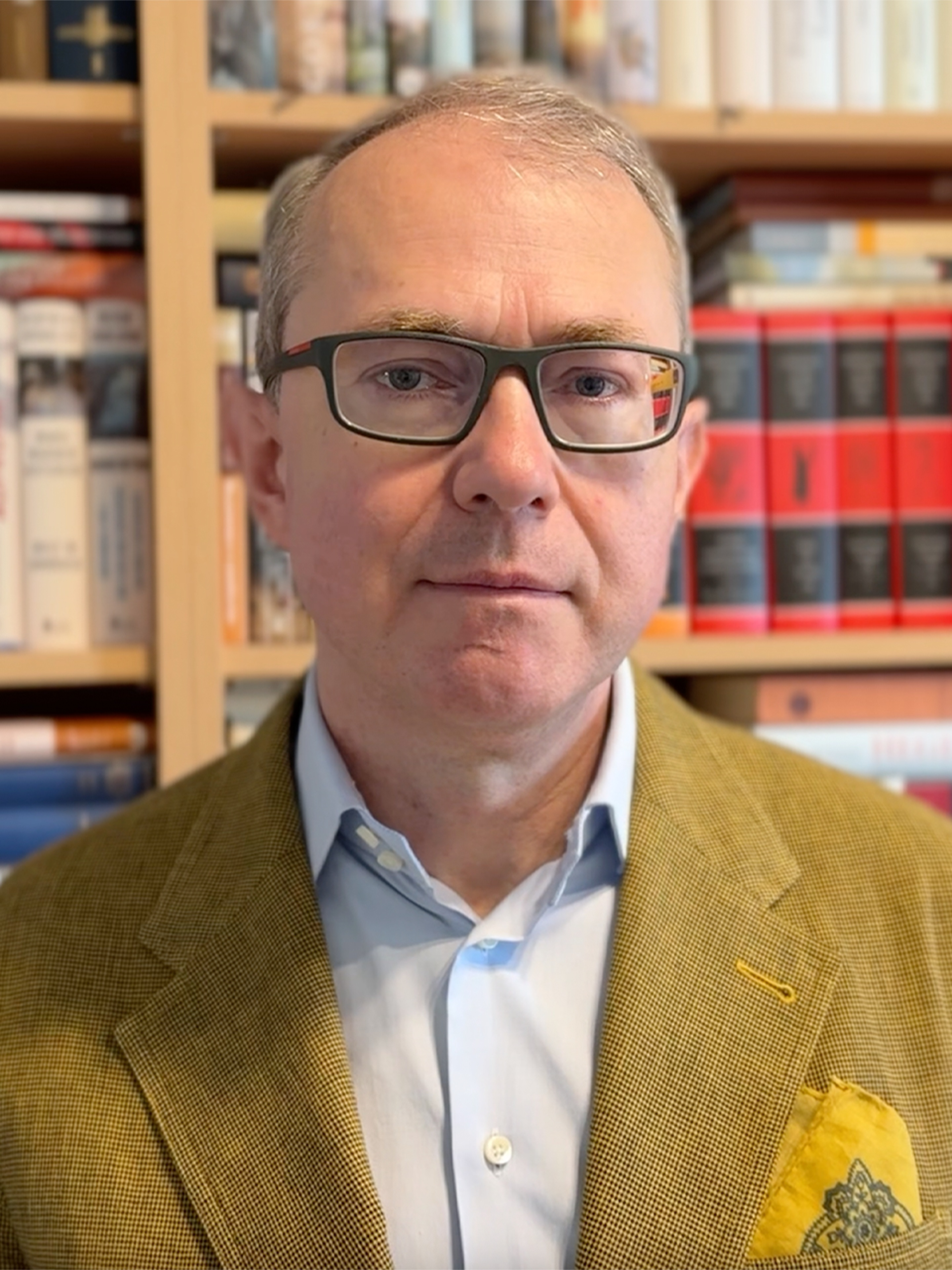
- Baumeister in 2025
- Born: 1 February 1970 (age 56); Cherkasy, Ukrainian SSR, Soviet Union
- Education: Taras Shevchenko National University of Kyiv; LMU Munich
- Occupation: Philosopher
- Notable work: Philosophy of Law (2011), Thomas Aquinas: An Introduction to His Thought (2012)

Andrii Olehovych Baumeister (Ukrainian: Андрій Олегович Баумейстер; born 1 February 1970) is a Ukrainian philosopher and a representative of the public turn in philosophy.

Baumeister is focused on ancient and medieval philosophy, ontology, metaphysics, philosophy of law, and philosophical textual studies. Baumeister translates philosophical texts from Latin, Ancient Greek, German, and French into Ukrainian and is the author of multiple publications on metaphysics, practical philosophy, and the history of philosophy in scholarly journals. He holds a Doctor of Philosophical Sciences degree (2015) and until 3 September 2023, was a professor in the Department of Theoretical and Practical Philosophy at Taras Shevchenko National University of Kyiv. As of 2025, he works as an independent philosopher.

He is the scientific editor of the "Ontology" section in the Ukrainian version of the European Dictionary of Philosophy (Ukrainian: Європейський словник філософій), directed by Barbara Cassin and Konstantyn Sigov.

In September 2024, he founded his own school, The Architect of Senses, which has around 500 students and provides both online and offline classes.

== Biography ==
Andrii Baumeister was born on 1 February 1970, in the city of Cherkasy. His father, Oleh Viktorovych Baumeister (1939–1983), was a painter and died when Andrii was 13 years old. His mother is Zhanna Alekseevna Baumeister.

According to Andrii Baumeister, he grew up in an artistic environment. From 1977 to 1983, he attended Secondary School No. 3 in Cherkasy and also studied violin at Music School No. 1. During his school years, he developed an interest in literature and began writing literary texts himself. In 1983, after his father's death, he enrolled in the Taras Shevchenko Republican Art School in Kyiv, majoring in painting. He was prepared for the entrance exams by artists who had been friends of his father — in particular, Viktor Klimenko.

From 1983 to 1988, he studied painting at the Republican Secondary Art School named after Taras Shevchenko. During this time that he first developed an interest in philosophy. He studied in the painting class under Oleh Zhyvotkov.

Until 1992, he worked as a stage and exhibition designer while engaging in self-directed philosophical studies. He was admitted to the Faculty of Philosophy on his fourth attempt.

From 1992 to 1997, he studied at the Faculty of Philosophy at Taras Shevchenko National University of Kyiv, and then entered the university's postgraduate program. In 1998, he completed an internship at the Institute of Philosophy at LMU Munich, under the supervision of Professor Hans Maier.

From 1998 to 2018, he taught metaphysics and the history of philosophy at the Thomas Aquinas Institute in Kyiv. Starting in 2001, he also taught philosophical anthropology and later classical German philosophy at the National University of Kyiv-Mohyla Academy.

In May 2001, he defended his candidate dissertation on the topic "First Principle and Being in Metaphysics (Based on the Metaphysics of Thomism)", under the supervision of Professor Anatoliy Loy.

From 2002 to 2023, he also taught various philosophical disciplines at Taras Shevchenko National University of Kyiv, including practical philosophy, philosophical categories, pragmatism and neopragmatism in contemporary philosophy, philosophy of law, metaphysics and ontology, philosophy of mind, philosophical theology, and philosophical textual studies.

In 2011, Baumeister's monograph Philosophy of Law received the N. L. Zlotina Award for the "Best Philosophical Monograph of the Last Decade" from the Hryhorii Skovoroda Institute of Philosophy and the Ukrainian Philosophical Foundation. Within the national Ukrainian "Book of the Year" ranking, his monographs At the Sources of Thought and Being (Ukr. Біля джерел мислення і буття) and Thomas Aquinas: An Introduction to His Thought (Ukr. Тома Аквінський: Бог, буття і мислення) were recognized as the best books of 2012 in the "Sophia" category (Ukrainian humanities).

In 2015, he defended his doctoral dissertation titled "Being and the Good: Ontological Foundations of Practical Normativity." Since 2015, he has been actively giving public lectures and working to popularize philosophy. He launched his YouTube channel, which now has over 390,000 subscribers. He has also collaborated as a lecturer with various private and public educational initiatives in Kyiv, such as Cultural Project, Otium.academy, Cowo.guru, and the Ukrainian School of Political Studies.

Andrii Baumeister is an active member of the Union of Contemporary Philosophy Researchers (Pascal Society) and the Kant Society in Ukraine. He has participated in international conferences organized by these academic societies. He collaborates closely with the Center for European Humanities (National University of Kyiv-Mohyla Academy). Baumeister is the author of multiple publications on metaphysics, practical philosophy, and the history of philosophy in scholarly journals, as well as several monographs and translations.

== The Architect of Senses School ==
In September 2024, Andrii Baumeister launched an educational initiative "The Architect of Senses School", aimed at the formation of an integrated and self-aware personality in individuals. The educational program include online and offline lectures, seminars, and group discussions allowing to develop skills in working with information and sources of varying complexity, develop conceptual and analytical thinking, learn to engage with metaphors and symbolic systems, build the ability to work with discourses and narratives, develop skills of argumentation and integration of reason, imagination, and emotion into a unified experience.

== Philosophical views ==
Andrii Baumeister's areas of scholarly interest include metaphysics, ontology, political philosophy, philosophy of law, the philosophy of Platonism, as well as medieval and contemporary scholasticism.

He has also worked on the academic edition of a collection of philosophical works by Descartes, on translations of Thomas Aquinas, and on the Ukrainian edition of the European Dictionary of Philosophies.

In terms of philosophical orientation, Andrii Baumeister is a neo-Thomist. He believes that the crisis of the modern world — in politics, society, philosophy, culture, and education — is rooted in the loss of theological and ontological foundations. According to him, this detachment has turned political life into a struggle for power and profit, generated various forms of aggressive and destructive activism in modern society, and reduced intellectual activity to superficial and contentless "games of reason." In such a situation, the main tasks of the intellectual are no longer the pursuit of truth or service to society, but rather servility to influential and power-seeking groups, or the endless production of pseudo-original conceptual constructs.

In recent years, he has been working on topics related to philosophy of consciousness, thinking, and the holistic development of the human person. He agrees with classifying himself as an idealist, a Christian conservative, and a theist.

He runs both Russian-language and Ukrainian-language YouTube channels devoted to the popularization of philosophy.

== Bibliography ==
- Baumeister, Andrii. Philosophy of Law. Kyiv: Taras Shevchenko National University of Kyiv Publishing House, 2011.
- Baumeister, Andrii. At the Sources of Thought and Being. Kyiv: Dukh i Litera, 2012.
- Baumeister, Andrii. Thomas Aquinas: An Introduction to His Thought. Kyiv: Dukh i Litera, 2012.
- Baumeister, Andrii. Being and the Good: Ontological Foundations of Practical Normativity. Vinnytsia, 2014.
- Baumeister, Andrii. On the Way to Thinking: Intellectual Journeys to the Land of Philosophy. Kyiv: Dmitry Burago Publishing House, 2021.
- Baumeister, Andrii. Pilgrimage to the Birthplace of Thought: Le Bec, Baghdad, Toledo, Paris, Todtnauberg. Kyiv: Koleso Zhyttia, 2024.
