= Maryna Asauliuk =

Ukrainian-American fashion designer

- Марина Асаулюк
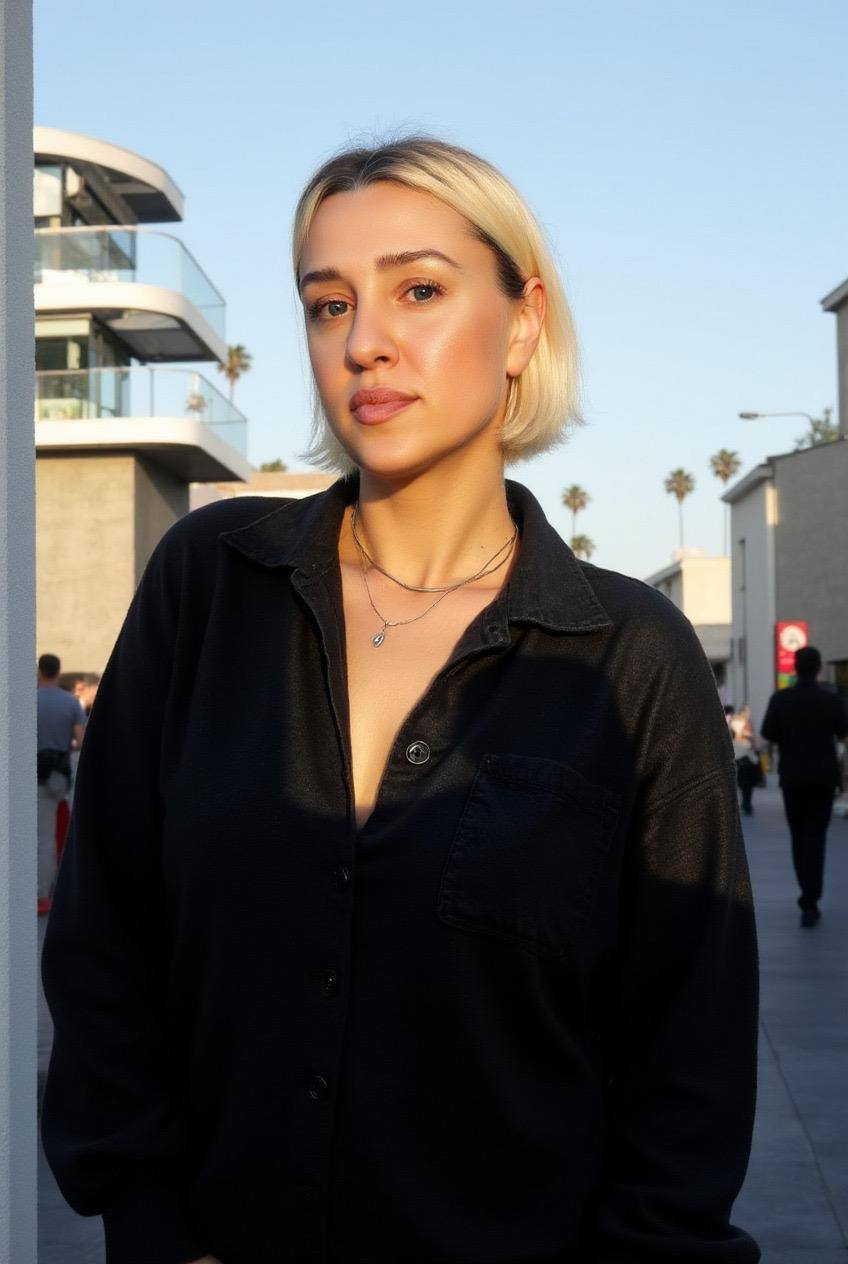
- Born: October 18, 1980 (age 45); Kiev, Ukrainian SSR, Soviet Union (now Kyiv, Ukraine)
- Occupations: fashion designer, stylist and art director
- Years active: 2006–present
- Children: 2
- Website: https://www.instagram.com/asauliuk_brand

Maryna Olehivna Asauliuk (Note: Ukrainian: Марина Олегівна Асаулюк, romanized: Maryna Olehivna Asauliuk) (born October 18, 1980) is a fashion designer, stylist and art director.

== Biography ==
She was born into the family of entrepreneur Oleg Syngayevskyi and trade manager Hanna Khramchenko. She graduated from Secondary School No. 16 and, in 1998–2003, studied at the Faculty of Law of the Kyiv University of Culture.

After graduating, she worked as a legal assistant in a law firm but soon realized that her true calling lay not in the legal field but in art. She continued her education at Kyiv National University of Technologies and Design, after which she opened her own atelier, MOA Fashion.

She also worked for the music television channel M1, focusing on set decoration.

== Career ==
Maryna Asauliuk is the creator of the most famous Ukrainian haute couture dress, made from thousands of ears of wheat. In this dress Hanna Poslavska, third vice-Miss Universe, represented Ukraine on the Miss Universe 2010 contest.

Formerly worked under the brand Moafashion, which produced an annual fashion calendar where Ukrainian, and European show business stars used to be as cloth demonstrators: Jamala, Kelly Joyce, Sergei Lazarev, Oleksandr Ponomariov, Andrii Kuzmenko, Olha Horbachiova, Philipp Kirkorov, Lama, Dasha Astafieva, Natalia Mohilevska, Potap, Nastya Kamenskykh, Ani Lorak, Olena Hrebeniuk, Asia Akhat, Loboda, Mika Newton, Lilia Podkopayeva, Nikolai Baskov, Yurii Nikitin, Viktor Pavlik, Anastasiia Prykhodko, Vladyslav Yama, Olha Sumska, Viktor Broniuk, Tina Karol, Albina Dzhanabaeva, Ostap Stupka, Oleh Lisohor and Timur Rodriguez.

In 2006, opera singer Olha Hrebeniuk in a dress by Maryna Asauliuk, won the "Eurovideo Grand Prix 2006"; the finale was held in the capital of Albania Tirana.

In 2007 Maryna Asauliuk represented three of her collections live at once under her own own-organized event KYIV MOA KYIV, that were dedicated to the 1525th anniversary of Kyiv, Maryna's hometown.

In 2009 popular by that time, girl-band Real O dedicated to Maryna Asauliuk their music video called "Platye" (English: Dress).

Maryna Asauliuk is the author of the transparent little black dress for the 55th Anniversary Playmate Dasha Astafieva on a 55th anniversary of Playboy party.

Since 2011, she has released a collection, "Українцем бути модно" (from ukr. It is stylish to be Ukrainian) in which she actively uses elements of Ukrainian folk, folk art and graphical design of Cossacks from the artist Oleksii Chebykin. Shirts from Maryna Asauliuk with original Cossack images were a hit of the season in Ukraine. Pirated copies can still be found selling in Kyiv and various markets across Ukraine.

From 2012 to 2016, she was working with her husband, a television producer Oleksandr Asaulyuk, as a chief art director for numerous shows. In particular, the show Tuzik & Barbos the world's first late-night show with dogs as hosts.

At the end of 2015, she's resumed her fashion activity as a designer under her own brand, ASAULIUK

In 2017, Maryna Asauliuk was again selected to design the National Costume for the Miss Universe 2017 competition in Las Vegas, USA. Especially for this event, Maryna created the St. Sophia dress named and dedicated in honor of the most ancient Ukrainian holy shrine of St. Sophia Cathedral of Kyiv. This costume was designed in California, USA, and production was carried out in Ukraine. The dress budget has exceeded 10 thousand USD. More than 20 high-top craftsmen were involved to the production of the dress. The famous Ukrainian embroidery was made with Swarovski crystals and glass beads and also specifically painted a picture of St. Sophia of Kyiv, which was then transferred to a cloth suit.

== Personal life ==
In 2024, she divorced her husband, Oleksandr.
