= Maryna Sokolyan =

Ukrainian author (born 1979)

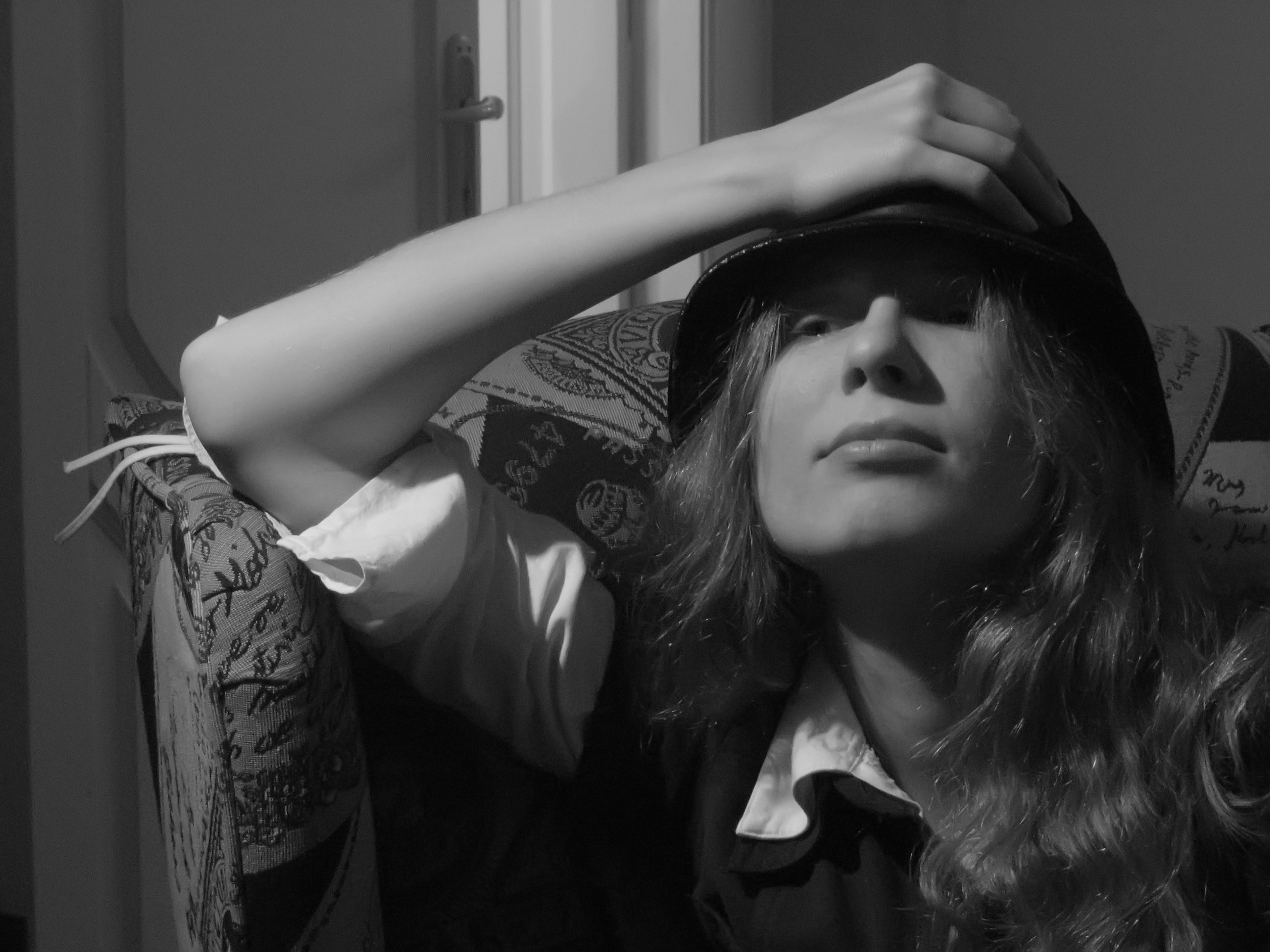
Maryna Sokolyan

Maryna Sokolyan is a Ukrainian author. The critical reviews define her work as "uncommon event in a contemporary fiction", and draw attention to the exquisite and well-cultivated language and to the complex intellectual references towards English literature. She was born 18 December 1979 in Poltava, in the Ukrainian SSR of the Soviet Union (in present-day Ukraine). In 2002 she graduated from Kyiv-Mohyla Academy with an MA in sociology.

== Publications ==
=== Books ===
- "The Curse of Hryhir Not-from-Here" novel, "Bohdan" publishing house, Ternopil, 2025
- "Serdtse Garpiji/The Harpy’s heart" novel, "Nora-Druk" publishing house, Kyiv, 2013
- "Vezhi ta pidzemellya/Towers and dungeons", "Grani-T" publishing house, Kyiv, 2008
- "Novendialia", "Fact" publishing house, Kyiv, 2008
- "Herem" novel", "Fact" publishing house, Kiev, 2007
- "Storonni v domi/Strangers in the House", "Fact" publishing house, Kyiv, 2006
- "Kodlo/Gang" (translation), "Idea-press" publishing house, Moscow, 2006
- "Kovdra snovydy/Sleepwalker's Blanket", "Fact" publishing house, Kyiv, 2005
- "Balada dlia Kryvoji Vargy/Ballade for the Crooked Varga", "Nora-Druk" publishing house, Kyiv, 2005
- "Kodlo/Gang", "Fact" publishing house, Kyiv, 2003
- "Tsurpalky/Splinters" short story collection, "Smoloskyp" publishing house, Kyiv, 2003

=== Plays ===
- "Retorta/Retort" published by the Sumno.com e-zine, Kyiv, 2006
- "Soul lifters and the spirit of capitalism", published by "Nora-Druk" publishing house, Kyiv, 2005
- "Dialogues of the Gods", published by "Pokolenije" magazine, Kyiv, 2003

== Selected awards ==
- 2008 ESFS encouragement award, Eurocon-2008
- 2008 "Portal" prize for the "Herem" novel
- 2006 "Koronatsia slova/ Coronation of the word" prize for the "Retorta" play
- 2005 Awarded a stipend by "Homines Urbani" program at Villa Decius, Kraków, Poland
- 2004 First place for literature in the "Biennale of the modern arts of Ukraine" (for the "Balada dlia Kryvoji Vargy" novel)
- 2003 First place in the "StArt" contest for young writers (for the "Kodlo" novel)
