= Maryna Tkachuk =

Ukrainian philosopher

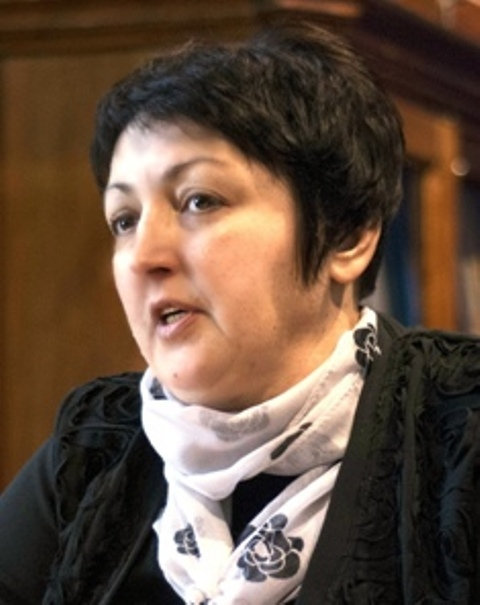
- Tkachuk in 2019
- Born: 21 September 1964 (age 61); Chernivtsi, Ukrainian SSR, Soviet Union
- Citizenship: Ukraine
- Education: Taras Shevchenko State University of Kyiv
- Scientific career
- Fields: Philosophy in universities and theological academies, theoretical and methodological problems of historical and philosophical perception, history of Kyiv Theological Academy
- Workplaces: Taras Shevchenko National University of Kyiv; National University of Kyiv-Mohyla Academy
- Thesis: Academic Philosophy in Kyiv of the 19th – the Beginning of the 20th Century and the Development of Science of History of Philosophy in Ukraine
- Doctoral advisor: Vilen Horsky

Maryna Leonidivna Tkachuk (Ukrainian: Марина Леонідівна Ткачук; born September 21, 1964) is a Ukrainian historian of philosophy, Dean of Faculty of Humanities of National University of Kyiv-Mohyla Academy. She was awarded the state award "Honoured Figure of Science and Technology of Ukraine" in 2015.

== Education ==
- 1971‒1974, school No. 1 of Chernivtsi.
- 1974‒1981, school No. 78 of Kyiv (with honors).
- 1981 – 1986, Taras Shevchenko State University of Kyiv, Faculty of Philosophy, Department of Philosophy. Qualification: philosopher, teacher of philosophical disciplines (with honors).
- 1986 – 1989, Taras Shevchenko State University of Kyiv, Postgraduate Studies.
- 1998 – 2001, National University of “Kyiv-Mohyla Academy”, Doctoral School.

== Degrees ==
- 1990, October ‒ Candidate of Philosophical Sciences (Ph. D.)

(Degree awarded based on the defense of Candidate Thesis at the specialized council of Institute of Philosophy of the Academy of Sciences of USSR in April 1990; Subject of the thesis: «A. N. Giljarov as Historian of Philosophy»; scientific coordinator – Prof. Y. Kushakov)

- 2002, February ‒ Doctor of Philosophical Sciences (Dr. Hab)

(Degree awarded based on the defense of Doctoral Thesis at the specialized council of H. Skovoroda Institute of Philosophy in October 2001; Subject of the thesis: «Academic Philosophy in Kyiv of the 19th – the Beginning of the 20th Century and the Development of Science of History of Philosophy in Ukraine»; scientific consultant – Prof. Vilen Horsky)

== Academic Status ==
- 1998, February ‒ Department of Philosophy and Religious Studies, Docent (Status awarded based on the decision of Senate of NaUKMA)
- 2003, April ‒ Department of Philosophy and Religious Studies, Professor (Status awarded based on the decision of Senate of NaUKMA)

== Career ==
- 1986, August ‒ 1986, December ‒ Taras Shevchenko State University of Kyiv, Department of Philosophy for Faculties of Humanities, professor's assistant
- 1989, December ‒ 1994, August ‒ Taras Shevchenko State University of Kyiv, Department of History of Philosophy and Logics, professor's assistant
- 1994, September ‒ 1996, August ‒ National University of “Kyiv-Mohyla Academy”, Department of Philosophy and Religious Studies, senior lecturer
- 1996, September ‒ 2001, December ‒ National University of “Kyiv-Mohyla Academy”, Department of Philosophy and Religious Studies, associate professor
- 2002, January ‒ currently ‒ National University of “Kyiv-Mohyla Academy”, Department of Philosophy and Religious Studies, professor
- 2007, June ‒ 2015, August ‒ National University of “Kyiv-Mohyla Academy”, Department of Philosophy and Religious Studies, head
- 2012, September ‒ currently ‒ National University of “Kyiv-Mohyla Academy”, Faculty of Humanities, dean

== Professional activities ==
- Member of a specialized scientific council of H. Skovoroda Institute of Philosophy (since 2002).
- Member of the board of Ukrainian Philosophical Foundation (since 2006).
- Member of the editorial board of the scientific journal Sententiae, indexed by Scopus (since 2011).
- Member of the editorial board of the international scientific peer-reviewed journal Kyiv-Mohyla Humanities Journal, indexed by Web of Science: Emerging Sources Citation Index (since 2014).
- Member of the scientific board of the journal of the Association of Philosophers of Slavic Countries ΣΟΦΙΑ (Rzeszow, Poland, since 2007).
- Editor-in-chief of the scientific journal Scientific Papers of NaUKMA. Philosophy and Religious Studies (2018‒2019).
- Head of the editorial board of the scientific journal Magisterium. Studies in History of Philosophy (since 2007).
- Head of the editorial board of the specialized professional edition of Philosophy and Religious Studies of the journal Scientific Papers of NaUKMA (2007–2017).
- Member of the editorial board of the interdisciplinary scientific peer-reviewed journal Kyiv Academy (since 2004).
- Member of the editorial board of the scientific compendium Ukrainian Humanitarian Outlook (since 2002).
- Member of the editorial board of scientific publication Modern Humanitarian Library (since 2007).

== Bibliography ==
The author, editor and co-author of more than 400 scientific publications on history of philosophy, religious studies, history of theological education, biographies on clerical and philosophical history etc.

== Books ==
- Tkachuk, M. (1997). Philosophy of Light and Joy: Oleksii Hiliarov. Kyiv: Ukrainskyi tsentr dukhovnoi kultury. [In Ukrainian].
- Tkachuk, M. (1999). Pamfil Yurkevych. From Manuscript Heritage. Publishing house “Kyievo-Mohylianska akademiia” [“Kyiv-Mohyla Academy”], Universytetske vydavnytstvo “Pulsary”. [In Ukrainian].
- Tkachuk, M. (2000). Kyiv Academic Philosophy of 19 – early 20 centuries: methodological problems of the research. Kyiv: VIPOL. [In Ukrainian]. Tkachuk, M. (Ed.). (2006). Kyiv-Mohyla Academy's Historical and Philosophical Seminar. Vol. І : 2003–2005. Kyiv: Publishing house “Kyievo-Mohylianska akademiia” [“Kyiv-Mohyla Academy”]. [In Ukrainian].
- Tkachuk, M. (Ed.). (2011). Philosophical Education in Ukraine: History and Modernity. Kyiv: Ahrar Media Hrup. [In Ukrainian].
- Tkachuk, M. & L. Arkhypova. (Eds.). (2011). Vilen Gorsky: touches, meanings, contemplation. Kyiv: Ahrar Media Hrup. [In Ukrainian].
- Tkachuk, M. & V. Briukhovetsky. (Eds.). (2015). Kyiv Theological Academy in names: 1819-1924: encyclopedia. Vol. 1: А–К. Kyiv: Publishing house “Kyievo-Mohylianska akademiia” [“Kyiv-Mohyla Academy”]. [In Ukrainian].
- Tkachuk, M. & V. Briukhovetsky. (Eds.). (2016). Kyiv Theological Academy in names: 1819-1924: encyclopedia. Vol. 2: L–Ya. Kyiv: Publishing house “Kyievo-Mohylianska akademiia” [“Kyiv-Mohyla Academy”]. [In Ukrainian].
- Tkachuk, M. (Ed.). (2016). A biographical Approach to the Study of the History and Heritage of Kyiv Theological Academy. Kyiv: Publishing house “Kyievo-Mohylianska akademiia” [“Kyiv-Mohyla Academy”]. [In Ukrainian].
- Tkachuk, M. (Ed.). (2019). Philosophical and Theological Heritage of Kyiv Theological Academy (1819‒1924): Experience of Archeographic and Bibliographic Studies. Kyiv: Publishing house “Kyievo-Mohylianska akademiia” [“Kyiv-Mohyla Academy”]. [In Ukrainian].
- Horskyi, V. & M., Tkachuk. (Eds.). (1997). Kiyv Horizons: Historical and Philosophical Essays. Kyiv: Stylos. [In Ukrainian].
- Horskyi, V., Stratii Ya., Tkachuk M. & A. Tykholaz. (2000). Kyiv in the Нistory of Рhilosophy of Ukraine. Kyiv: Publishing house “Kyievo-Mohylianska akademiia” [“Kyiv-Mohyla Academy”], Universytetske vydavnytstvo “Pulsary”. [In Ukrainian].
- Horskyi, V. & M., Tkachuk. (Eds.). (2002). Philosophical Thought in Ukraine: A Dictionary of Biography and Bibliography. Kyiv: Universytetske vydavnytstvo "Pulsary" [In Ukrainian].
- Morenets V. & M., Tkachuk. (Eds.). (2010). Person in Time: (Philosophical Aspects of Ukrainian Literature of the XX‒XXI Centuries). Kyiv: Universytetske vydavnytstvo “Pulsary”. [In Ukrainian].

== Selected articles and book chapters ==
- Tkachuk, M. (1996). Orest Novytskyi as a Рhilosopher and Нistorian of Рhilosophy. [In Ukrainian]. Naukovi Zapysky NaUKMA, 1 (Filosofiia ta Relihiieznavstvo), 85–93.
- Tkachuk, M. (1998). Kyiv Period of V. Zenkovskyi's Creativity. [In Ukrainian]. Mahisterium, 1 (Istoryko-filosofski studii), 28‒37.
- Tkachuk, M. (1999). Henrikh Yakubanis as a Historian of Philosophy. [In Ukrainian]. Mandrivets, 4, 32‒36.
- Tkachuk, M. (2000). Kyiv-Mohyla Academy and the Formation of Academic Philosophy in Ukraine. [In Ukrainian]. Filosofska dumka, 4, 37‒56.
- Tkachuk, M. (2000). Academic Philosophy as a Phenomenon. [In Ukrainian]. Naukovi Zapysky NaUKMA, 18 (Filosofiia ta Relihiieznavstvo), 52–58.
- Tkachuk, M. (2001). “Famous Kyiv School”: a Phenomenon or a Metaphor? [In Ukrainian]. Filosofska dumka, 2, 58‒82.
- Tkachuk, M. (2001). Theoretical and Methodological Problems of Historical and Philosophical Knowledge in Sylvestr Hohotskyi's Heritage. [In Ukrainian]. Naukovi Zapysky NaUKMA, 19 (Filosofiia ta Relihiieznavstvo), 70–75.
- Tkachuk, M. (2001). Kant Studies in Kyiv Academic Philosophy of 19th and Еarly 20th Сenturies. [In Ukrainian]. Collegium, 11, 103–19.
- Tkachuk, M. (2001). Verba Volant, Scripta Manent: Manuscripts from “Ukrainskyi svit”. [InUkrainian]. Ukrainskyi humanitarnyi ohliad, 6, 129‒153.
- Tkachuk, M. (2002). History of Philosophy in the Cultural Dimension (from the Experience of Kyiv Historians of Philosophy of XIX ‒ Beginning of XX Century). [In Ukrainian]. Naukovi Zapysky NaUKMA, 20 (Filosofiia ta Relihiieznavstvo), 19–29.
- Tkachuk, M. (2002). From the History of University Philosophy in Kyiv: G. I. Chelpanov's Psychological Seminary. [In Ukrainian]. Naukovi Zapysky NaUKMA, 20 (Special Issue, 1), 82–87.
- Tkachuk, M. (2002). Studying the History of Philosophy in Kyiv Theological Academy of the XIX ‒ Early XX Centuries. [In Ukrainian]. Mahisterium, 9 (Istoryko-filosofski studii), 35‒51.
- Tkachuk, M. (2003). Historical and Philosophical Antique Studies in Kyiv in the XIX ‒ Early XX Centuries. [In Ukrainian]. Naukovi Zapysky NaUKMA, 21 (Filosofiia ta Relihiieznavstvo), 49–59.
- Tkachuk, M. (2004). Studying the History of Philosophy in St. Vladimir's University. [In Ukrainian]. Mahisterium, 13 (Istoryko-filosofski studii), 65‒74.
- Tkachuk, M. (2005). Philosophical Heritage of Kyiv Mohyla Academy: Research Strategies. [In Ukrainian]. L. Dovha & N. Yakovenko (Eds.). Ukraine of the 17th Century: Society, Philosophy, Culture: Collection of Scientific Works in Honor of Prof. V. M. Nichyk. (pp. 73‒82). Кyiv: Krytyka.
- Tkachuk, M. (2006). Philosophy in Theological Academies as Phenomenon. [In Ukrainian]. Kyiv Academy, 2‒3, 237‒243.
- Tkachuk, M. (2006). Kyiv in the Religious and Philosophical Renaissance of Early 20th Century. [In Russian]. In K. Syhov (Ed.). Person. History. News (pp. 283‒300). Kyiv: Dukh i Litera.
- Tkachuk, M. (2007). Kyiv Theological Academy in the Educational Institution's Movement four Autonomy in Early 20th Century. [In Ukrainian]. Kyiv Academy, 4, 149‒165.
- Tkachuk, M. (2007). Dmytro Chizhevsky and the Tradition of Ukrainian «Cordology». Journal of Ukrainian Studies, 32 (2), 73‒82.
- Tkachuk, M. (2008). Philosophical Education's Problems in Works by Kyiv Theological Academy's Thinkers. [In Ukrainian]. Kyiv Academy, 5, 58‒66.
- Tkachuk, M. (2008). A Problem of Faith and Knowledge in Petro Linytskyi's Сreativity. [In Ukrainian]. Naukovi Zapysky NaUKMA, 76 (Filosofiia ta Relihiieznavstvo), 35–42.
- Tkachuk, M. (2009). Philosophical Heritage of Kyiv Theological Academy: Status and Prospects of Research. [In Ukrainian]. Trudy Kyivskoi dukhovnoi akademii, 11, 205‒214.
- Tkachuk, M. (2010). Saint Innokentii (Borisov) and his Role in the History of the Kyiv Theological Academy (on the 210th Anniversary of his Birth). [In Russian]. Trudy Kyivskoi dukhovnoi akademii, 12, 207‒225.
- Tkachuk, M. (2010). On the Role of Philosophy in Orthodox Spiritual Education: History lessons. [In Russian]. Trudy Kyivskoi dukhovnoi akademii, 13, 187‒199.
- Tkachuk, M. (2010). Philosophical Education in the Soviet Ukraine: The Experience of Understanding of Historical Documents and Archival Materials. [In Ukrainian]. Filosofska dumka, 6, 35‒67.
- Tkachuk, M. (2011). Transformational Processes in a Theological School of the Early 20th Century: the Experience of Kyiv Theological Academy. [In Russian]. Trudy Kyivskoi dukhovnoi akademii, 14, 121‒129.
- Tkachuk, M. (2012). To Biography of Petro Kudriavtsev: from Materials of 1938–1939 Investigative Case. [In Ukrainian]. Mahisterium, 47 (Istoryko-filosofski studii), 68‒100.
- Tkachuk, M. (2013). The Graduates and Teachers of Kyiv Theological Academy in the Episcopate of the Orthodox Churches. [In Ukrainian]. Kyiv Academy, 11, 161‒197.
- Tkachuk, M. (2014). Kyiv-Mohyla Academy in the History of Philosophical Education. [In Ukrainian]. Pamiatky Ukrainy, 197, 32–41.
- Tkachuk, M. (2016). Orest Novytskyi: Supplements to the Biography. [In Ukrainian]. Mahisterium, 65 (Istoryko-filosofski studii), 73‒84.
- Tkachuk, M. (2016). The Encyclopedic Project “Kyiv Theological Academy in Names (1819‒1924)”: from Concept to Results. [In Ukrainian]. In N. Yakovenko & N. Shlychta (Eds.). The Path in Four Centuries: Proceedings of the International Scientific Conference “Ad fontes ‒ To the Sources” to the 400th Anniversary of Kyiv-Mohyla Academy. October 12–14, 2015 (pp. 142‒155). Kyiv: National University of “Kyiv-Mohyla Academy”.
- Tkachuk, M. (2017). Prominent Theologians of Kyiv Theological Academy: Mikhailo Skaballanovich (Based on Archival Materials). [In Ukrainian]. Naukovi Zapysky NaUKMA, 192 (Filosofiia ta Relihiieznavstvo), 53–66.
- Tkachuk, M. (2019). Philosophical Issues in Handwritten Candidate Works of Kyiv Theological Academy Students (1819‒1924). [In Ukrainian]. Sententiae, 38 (2), 19‒36.
- Tkachuk, M. (2019). Handwritten Candidate Works of Kyiv Theological Academy Students as Sources for Studying the Academy's Philosophical Heritage. Kyiv Mohyla Humanities Journal, 6, 43‒67

== Awards and Commendations ==
- 2005 ‒ St. Petro Mohyla Medal (Kyiv-Mohyla Academy)
- 2007 ‒ Excellence Award (Department of Education and Sciences of Ukraine)
- 2010 ‒ Award for the best international publications (Kyiv-Mohyla Academy)
- 2015 ‒ Honored Figure of Science and Technology of Ukraine (President of Ukraine)
- 2016 ‒ Award for the outstanding achievements in the development of Ukrainian intellectual tradition (Ukrainian Philosophical Foundation)

== Sources ==
- Tkachuk Maryna Leonidivna // Philosophical Encyclopedical Vocabulary. [In Ukrainian] — Kyiv.: Abrys, 2002. — P. 639.
- Website of NaUKMA
