= Croatian name =

Croatian names follow complex and unique lettering, structuring, composition, and naming customs that have considerable similarities with most other European name systems and with those of other Slavic peoples in particular.

Upon the Croatian populace's arrival on what is currently modern-day continental Croatia in the early 7th century, Croats used Slavic names and corresponding naming customs. Naming customs have been a part of Croatian culture for over 500 years, with the earliest dating back to the 12th century.

With modernization and globalization in the 20th century, given names and surnames have expanded past typical Slavic traditionalism and have included borrowed names from all over the world. However, although given names vary from region to region in Croatia and can be heavily influenced by other countries' names, surnames tend to be Slavic. Croatian names usually, but not always, consist of a given name, followed by a family name; however certain names follow naming customs that diverge from the norm.

Historically, Croatian royalty were all given traditional titles of nobility designating them with certain privileges and social standing; the titles were usually followed by the full name or simply their surname. In modern-day society, families all over the country use honorific titles and surname when speaking to family members who are older or as a sign of general respect. Traditionally, only close friends or direct family members address each other by their first names.

== Style and form of address ==
=== Nobility ===
During 925 - 1102, the Kingdom of Croatia's nobility had various titles and forms of address that varied from region to region and position to position. The King of Croatia was afforded the right of choosing his royal handle, for example in 1941, Prince Adimone, Duke of Aosta, took the name of King Tomislav II upon his succession to the Croatian throne. Titles were exclusive to members of the King's High Court and included the Queen consort and the following:

1. Duke (the highest ranking a noble could receive in his majesty's court)
2. Marquess (a lineage rank through European peerage)
3. Count (a successive rank to the Marquess)
4. Baron (title of honor bestowed on a civilian whose actions warranted the title)

The titles were usually followed by the full name or more commonly by their surname.

=== Government ===
The Government of Croatia, which includes its executive branch and parliament, employ selected titles usually corresponding to position or powers. Titles are also bestowed on members of the Croatian Judiciary.

==== Prime ministerial style ====
1. Predsjednik Vlade (Prime Minister (PM) of Croatia; the title is usually followed by the name of the incumbent)
2. His or Her Excellency (For the preface of the PM on foreign travel or amidst diplomatic work)
3. Premijer (unofficial; this title is also usually followed by the name of the incumbent)

==== Presidential style ====
1. Predsjednik (President of Croatia; the title is also usually followed by the surname of the incumbent)

==== Parliamentary style ====
1. Predsjednik Sabora (Speaker of the Croatian Parliament; title followed by full legal name)
2. Mister or Madam Speaker (as for Predsjednik Sabora)

==== Judicial style ====
1. His or Her Honor (For judges on the Judiciary of Croatia and Constitutional Court of Croatia)

=== Honorific titles ===
It is common etiquette in Croatia to address members of society with honorific titles as a sign of respect and societal distance. It is only with close friends or direct family members that first names are used. Honorific titles include the following and are usually followed by the surname of the addressed.

1. Gospodin (corresponding to Mr. or Sir in English and Monsieur in French)
2. Gospođa (corresponding to Ms. or Mrs. in English and Madame in French)
3. Gospođica (corresponding to Miss in English and Mademoiselle in French)

== Croatian given names ==
=== History ===
Since their 7th century arrival in today's homeland, Croats have used Slavic names. Through the following centuries, foreign names were also accepted (mainly Roman and less Greek), especially those that mark Christian faith. According to the analysis of the anthroponyms of the Dalmatian city-states Split (and Poljica) and Trogir in the 11th century, it is estimated that 25% of upper class and 50% of citizens of Split had Slavic/Slavicized names, while both in Pojica and Trogir were predominantly Slavic/Slavicized. By the 13th century, 64% of names in Zadar had Slavic origin. The common Slavic given names, including Slavicized names of Roman or Christian origin, at the time were: Črnja/Črnje, Črneha, Črno, Dabro, Desa (< Desimir, Desina), Dobralj, Dobro/Dobre, Dobronja, Dobroša, Drago, Dragovit, Grčina, Kočina, Mihač, Mihe, Mirča/Mirče, Odoljen, Petronja, Prodan, Prvo (< Prvoneg), Sema, Valica, Vitača, Vlčina Zune (masculine); Biula, Bonica, Brana, Dobra, Dobrača, Dobrica/Dabrica, Godača, Kastrica/Kostrica, Katena, Mirača, Nemira, Stana, Veranica (feminine); Bela, Bogobojša, Gravalana, Hrl(a)c, Hudi, Kozlina, Kozonog, Krnja, Mačica, Naplata, Neslana, Platihleb, Platimisa, Poluduša, Treskalo, Tvrdouhati, Uzdiša, Zveronja (nicknames). Petar Šimunović also noted many Croatian names in Roman cities of Dubrovnik, Kotor, Split, Trogir, Zadar, Rab, Osor, Krk in the 11th and 12th century.

Slavic names remained dominant almost until the Council of Trent (1545–63) when the Catholic church decided that every Christian should have Christian name instead of native one. This lasted until the 19th century, when Croats again started to use neglected traditional names—especially those of mediæval Croatian kings and dukes. More recently, as a result of globalization, unusual and exotic names of various cultures have also gained in wide spread popularity.

=== Frequency ===
According to 2011 Census in Croatia, the most frequent male names are Ivan, Marko, Josip, Stjepan and Tomislav, and the most common female names include Marija, Ana and Ivana.

The 2011 census data by decade of birth shows other common given names depending on the decade, including Željko, Mario, Ivica, Luka, Franjo, Ante, Damir for males and Kata, Dragica, Nada, Ljubica, Vesna, Mirjana for females.

=== Traditional Croatian names ===
Some common Croatian names of Slavic origin include:

==== Feminine ====
- Berislava
- Blaga
- Blagica
- Bogdana
- Bogomila, Bogumila
- Borka
- Borislava
- Bożena
- Bożena
- Božica
- Božidarka
- Branimira
- Branka
- Buga
- Cvita
- Cvijeta
- Danica
- Davorka
- Divna
- Dragana
- Dragica
- Dragomirka
- Dragomira
- Draginja
- Dragina
- Draga
- Draženka
- Dražena
- Dubravka
- Dunja
- Hrvoja or Hrvojka
- Jasenka
- Jasna
- Ljuba
- Ljubica
- Mila
- Milica
- Miljenka
- Mislava
- Mira
- Mirjana
- Mirka
- Misirka
- Mirna
- Mojmira
- Morana
- Nada
- Neda
- Nediljka
- Nevenka
- Ognjenka
- Ranka
- Rašeljka
- Ratka
- Ruža
- Ružica
- Sanja
- Slava
- Slavica
- Slavenka
- Smilja, Smiljana
- Spomenka
- Srebrenka
- Stanislava
- Stana
- Stanka
- Snežana, Snješka, Snježana
- Sunčana
- Sunčica
- Tjeha
- Tihana
- Tihomila
- Tuga
- Vedrana
- Vera
- Verica
- Vjera
- Vesna
- Vjekoslava
- Vlasta
- Vlatka
- Zdenka
- Zlata
- Zora, Zorica, Zorka
- Zrinka
- Zrina
- Zvjezdana
- Zvonimira, Zvonka
- Željka
- Živka

==== Masculine ====
- Berislav
- Berivoj
- Blago
- Bogdan
- Bojan
- Boris
- Borislav
- Borna
- Božetjeh
- Božidar
- Božo
- Brajko
- Branimir
- Branko
- Braslav
- Bratislav
- Bratoljub
- Budimir
- Časlav
- Cvitko
- Cvjetko
- Czesław
- Častimir
- Čedomir
- Dalibor
- Damir
- Darko
- Davor
- Desimir
- Dobroslav
- Dobrovit
- Domagoj
- Dragan
- Drago
- Dragoslav
- Dragutin
- Dragomir
- Dražen
- Držiha
- Držislav
- Godzimir, Godemir
- Gojko
- Gojislav
- Gojslav
- Goran
- Grubiša
- Hrvatin
- Hrvoje, Hrvoj
- Hrvoslav
- Kazimir, Kažimir
- Jasenko
- Klonimir
- Krasimir, Krešimir
- Krševan
- Lavoslav
- Ljubomir
- Ljudevit
- Milan
- Mile
- Milivoj
- Milovan
- Miljenko
- Mihael
- Mihovil
- Mirko
- Miroslav
- Miroš
- Mislav
- Mladen
- Mojmir
- Mutimir
- Nediljko
- Nedjeljko
- Nenad
- Ognjen
- Ostoja
- Ozren
- Predrag
- Pribislav
- Prvan
- Prvoslav
- Prvoš
- Radimir, Radomir
- Radoš
- Rajko
- Ranko
- Ratimir
- Ratko
- Rato
- Radovan
- Radoslav
- Slaven
- Slaviša
- Slavoljub
- Sławomir, Slavomir
- Smiljan
- Spomenko
- Srebrenko
- Srećko
- Stanislav
- Stanko
- Strahimir
- Svetoslav, Sviatoslav
- Tihomil
- Tihomir
- Tješimir
- Tomislav
- Tomo
- Tvrtko
- Trpimir
- Vatroslav
- Većeslav
- Vedran
- Velimir
- Veselko
- Vidoslav
- Vjekoslav
- Vjenceslav
- Višeslav
- Vitomir
- Vjeran
- Vladimir
- Vladislav, Vlado
- Vlatko
- Vojmil
- Vojnomir
- Vuk
- Zdenko
- Zdzisław, Zdeslav
- Zdravko
- Zorislav
- Zoran
- Zrinko, Zrinoslav
- Zlatan, Zlatko
- Zvonimir
- Zvonimir, Zvonko
- Žarko
- Želimir
- Željko
- Živko

=== Christian names ===
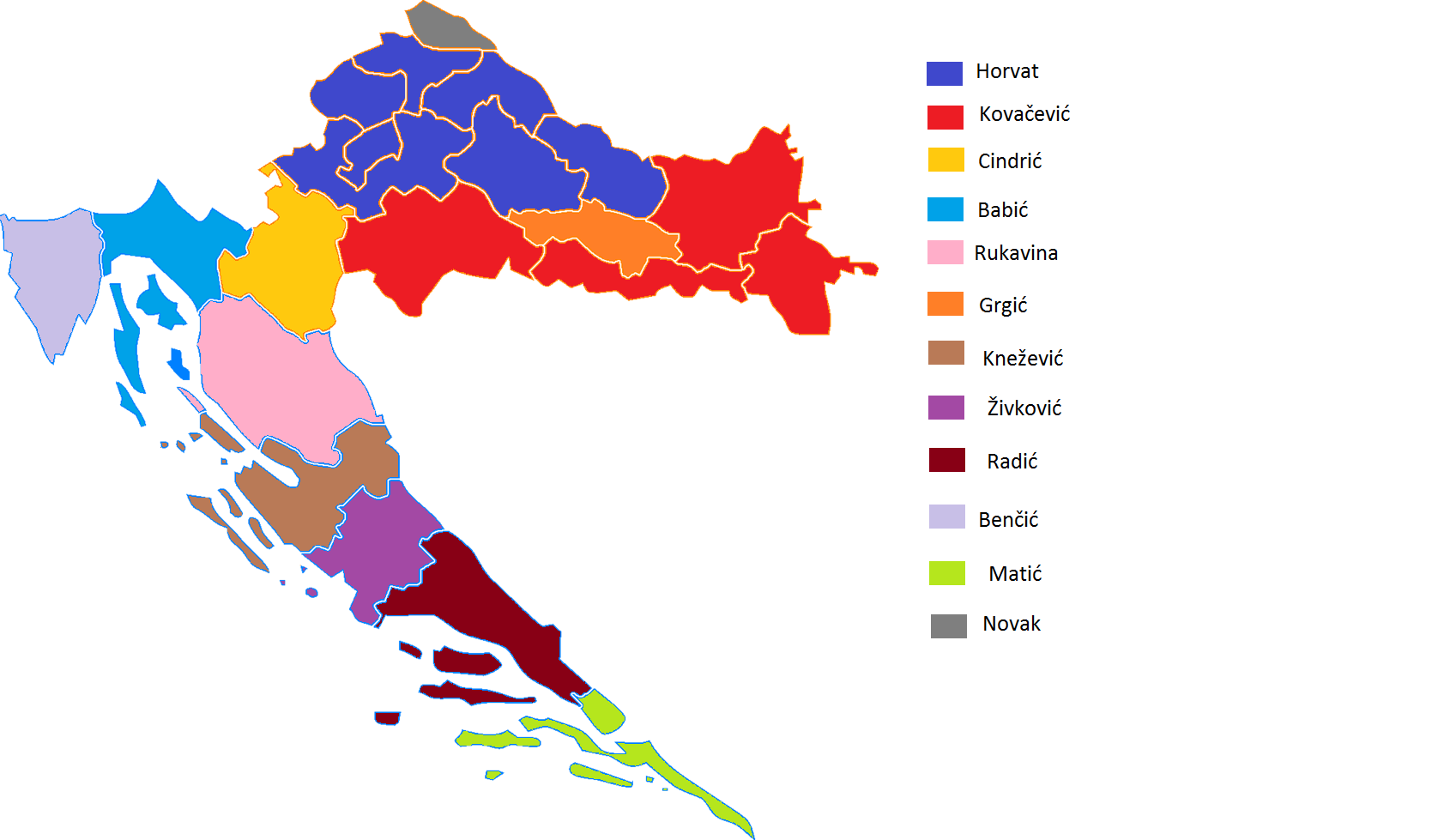
The most frequent Croatian family names by county

Names used commonly in the Christian world were adopted with the spread of the faith, being assimilated into native forms for local use. Some Croatian versions of first names originally associated with saints or important Christian figures are shown below:

- Aleksandar (Alexander)
- Ana (Anna)
- Ante or Antun (Anthony)
- Andrija (Andrew)
- Danijel (Daniel)
- David
- Dominik (Dominic)
- Edvard (Edward)
- Filip (Philip, Phillip)
- Franjo (Francis)
- Fridrik (Frederick)
- Grgur (Gregory)
- Henrik (Henry)
- Ilija (Elijah)
- Ivan (John)
- Jakov (Jacob)
- Josip (Joseph)
- Juraj (George)
- Karlo (Charles)
- Katarina (Catherine)
- Kristofor (Christopher)
- Lav (Leo)
- Ljudevit (Lewis)
- Lovro (Lawrence)
- Luka (Luke)
- Marko (Mark)
- Marija (Mary)
- Matej (Matthew)
- Mihael, Mihovil, Mihajlo (Michael)
- Nikola, Nikša, Niko, Mikula (Nicholas)
- Pavao (Paul)
- Petar, Pero (Peter)
- Rikard (Richard)
- Sebastijan (Sebastian)
- Silvestar
- Šimun (Simon)
- Stjepan, Stipan, Stipe (Stephen)
- Toma (Thomas)
- Vasilije (Vassilios, Basil)
- Vilim (William)
- Vinko (Vincent)

=== Borrowed or foreign names ===
Due to globalization and remnants of historical significance (i.e. Croatia–Italy relations, Illyrian Provincial nationalism, etc.) many people in Croatia have French, Swedish, Finnish, German, Italian and American, English or Anglophone first names (given names). However, due to the alphabetical limitation of Croatian many names take on new pronunciations, are respelled, or are restructured to comply with the country's naming customs. Uncharacteristic names by nationality of origin include: (Anglophone): Thomas, Charles, Max, Jacob, William, Isabella, Emma, Madison, Matthew, Alexander; (German): Hans, Peter, Stephan, Gerhard, Edith, Gabriele, Monika, Wolfgang, Dennis; (French): Jean-Louis, Lucus, Marie, Clément, Camille, Baptiste, Léonie, Julien, Françoise, Jeanne; (Italian): Alessandro, Andrea, Alessia, Claudia, Christian, Riccardo, Luca, Matteo, Leonardo, Sofia ...

== Croatian family names ==
Family names started to appear among Croats in the 12th century, and according to Petar Šimunović they were the first Slavic nation to have surnames. At least since the 16th-century Council of Trent, both the given and family names would be written down, particularly for women who until then were mostly without surname. The surnames have various suffixes, mainly ending on "-ić", "-ović", "-ević", "-inić". In comparison to the Eastern Orthodox Slavs such as the Serbs, who only in the 19th century got permanent surnames, in Croatian culture it is uncommon to use personal or hypocoristic name to refer to someone in official or public speech, contrary to the examples like Vuk Karadžić being known simply as "Vuk"; likewise the patronymic surnames are less prevalent because of the prior existence of other forms of surnames.

=== Origins ===
Croatian family names have five different origins:

- Given names, matronymics and patronymics: Anić, Blažević, Ivanec, Marić, Stipanov ...
- Professional or occupational names: Kovač (blacksmith), Klobučar (hatmaker), Lončar (potter), Tkalčić (weaver), Stolar (carpenter) ...
- Nicknames: Debeljak, Crnić, Obad ...
- Toponyms: Duvnjak (from Duvno), Kuprešak (from Kupres), Bosanac (Bosnian), Posavec (from Posavina), Zagorec (from Hrvatsko Zagorje) ...
- Ethnic designation: Hrvat, Horvat, Hrvatin, Horvatinčić ... (Croat), Čerkez (Circassians), Čeh (Czech), Mađar (Hungarians), Vlahović (Vlachs) ...

=== Frequency ===
The 2011 Croatian census registered the following as the most frequent Croatian family names:

1. Horvat
2. Kovačević
3. Babić
4. Marić
5. Jurić
6. Novak
7. Kovačić
8. Knežević
9. Vuković
10. Marković

== Naming customs ==
In the south of the country, although not consistently, the following mechanism was used in naming, one that has been in practice for over four centuries:

1. The oldest son is named after the father's father.
2. The oldest daughter is named after the father's mother.
3. The second oldest son is named after the mother's father.
4. The second oldest daughter is named after the mother's mother.

Other children of the father are either named after favorite aunts or uncles or sometimes, after the saint of the day they were born.

== See also ==
- Name of Croats
- Slavic names
- Slavic surnames
