= Borka =

Borka may refer to:

== Places ==
- Bôrka, a village and municipality in Slovakia
- Borka, Kamrup, a village in Assam, India
- Borka, former name of the island of Piirissaar, Estonia

== People ==
- Borka (given name)
- Gyula Borka (b. 1959), Hungarian athlete

== Other ==
- Borka: The Adventures of a Goose With No Feathers, a children's book by John Burningham
