= Davorin =

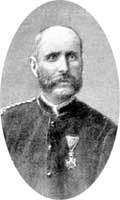
Davorin Jenko, a Slovene composer

Davorin is a masculine given name. Notable people with the name include:

- Davorin Bogović (born 1960), Croatian rock musician
- Davorin Dolar (1921–2005), Slovene chemist
- Davorin Jenko (1835–1914), Slovene composer
- Davorin Kablar (born 1977), Slovene footballer
- Davorin Karničar (born 1962), Slovene alpinist and extreme skier
- Davorin Marčelja (1924-2011), Croatian decathlete
- Davorin Popović (1946–2001), Bosnian pop singer
- Davorin Savnik (1929-2014), Slovene architect
- Davorin Stetner (born 1981), Croatian entrepreneur
- Davorin Trstenjak (1817–1890), Slovene writer, historian and priest
- Martin Davorin-Jagodić (1935-2020), Croatian composer

== See also ==
- Davorin (award), Bosnian music award now known as Indexi
- Davor (name)
