= Kukoč =

Kukoč is a Croatian surname. Notable people with the surname include:

- Toni Kukoč (born 1968), Croatian basketball player
- Tonći Kukoč (born 1990), Croatian footballer
- Vedran Kukoč (born 1976), Croatian footballer
