= Desislava =

- Gender: feminine

Origin
- Language: Slavic
- Meaning: "one that finds glory/fame"
- Region of origin: Bulgaria

Other names
- Derived: desiti (to find, to encounter) and slava (glory, fame)

Desislava or Dessislava (Bulgarian: Десислава) is a Bulgarian feminine given name, derived from the Slavic elements desiti (to find, to encounter) and slava (glory, fame), thus meaning "one that finds glory".

Notable people with the name include:

- Desislava, (fl. 12th c.), Princess of Duklja
- Desislava (fl. 13th c.), Bulgarian noble of the second Bulgarian Empire
- Desislava of Bulgaria (fl. 14th c.), Princess of Bulgaria during the Second Bulgarian Empire
- Desislava Aleksandrova-Mladenova (born 1975), Bulgarian high jumper
- Desislava Atanasova (born 1978), Bulgarian judge and politician.
- Desislava Balabanova (born 1988), Bulgarian sport shooter
- Desislava Bozhilova (born 1992), Bulgarian international snooker referee
- Desislava Doneva (born 1979), Bulgarian singer known mononymously as Desi Slava
- Dessislava Mladenova (born 1988), Bulgarian tennis player
- Dessislava Nikodimova (born 1966), Bulgarian volleyball player
- Desislava Petrova (born 1980), Bulgarian gay rights activist
- Desislava Radeva (born 1969), First Lady of Bulgaria
- Dessislava Roussanova, Bulgarian journalist
- Desislava Stoyanova (born 1992), Bulgarian biathlete
- Desislava Taneva (born 1972), Bulgarian politician
- Desislava Topalova (born 1978), Bulgarian tennis player
- Dessislava Velitchkova (born 1972), Bulgarian volleyball player

== See also ==
- Desislav, male variant of the name
- Desislava Cove, a cove of Antarctica
