= Čedomir =

- Pronunciation: Serbian pronunciation: [t͡ʃědomir]
- Gender: male

Origin
- Origin: Slavic

Čedomir (Cyrillic script: Чедомир) is a Slavic masculine given name. It is derived from the Slavic elements čedo ("child") and miru ("peace, world").

== Notable people with the name ==
- Čedomir Antić (born 1974), Serbian historian and professor
- Čedomir Božić (1984–2024) Serbian politician
- Čedomir Čupić (born 1947), Serbian political scientist and professor
- Čedomir "Ljubo" Čupić (1913–1942), Yugoslav member of the Communist resistance movement
- Čedomir Đoinčević (born 1961), Serbian football coach
- Čedomir Janevski (born 1961), Macedonian football coach
- Čedomir Jovanović (born 1971), Serbian politician
- Čedomir Lazarević (1926–1962), Serbian footballer
- Čedomir Marjanović (1906–1945), Serbian politician
- Čedomir Mijanović (born 1980), Montenegrin footballer
- Čedomir Mirković (1944–2005), Serbian writer and literary critic
- Čedomir Pavičević (born 1978), Serbian footballer
- Čedomir Stojković (born 1982), Serbian lawyer and politician
- Čedomir Tomčić (born 1987), Serbian footballer
- Čedomir Vitkovac (born 1982), Serbian basketball player
