= Blaga =

Blaga may refer to:

- Blaga (name)
- Blaga, a village in Dealu Morii Commune, Bacău County
- Blaga, a village in Schitu Duca Commune, Iași County
- 4891 Blaga, main-belt asteroid
