= Davor =

Davor can refer to:

- Davor, Croatia, a village in Croatia
- Davor (name), a Slavic given name
