= Kranjčar =

Kranjčar is a Croatian surname. Notable people with the surname include:

- Zlatko Kranjčar (1956–2021), Croatian footballer and manager
- Niko Kranjčar (born 1984), Croatian footballer, son of Zlatko
