= Grubor =

Grubor is a surname. Notable people with the surname include:

- Borka Grubor (born 1960), Serbian politician
- Darko Grubor (1962–2016), Serbian football manager
- Ivana Grubor (born 1984), Serbian basketball player
- Luka Grubor (born 1973), Croatian-British rower
- Slobodan Grubor (born 1968), Croatian footballer
