= Guogan =

Guogan may refer to following individuals can be transliterated to Kanji pronounced by Hanyu Pinyin:

- 国幹 (Gúogàn), a masculine Japanese given name
- 果敢 (Gúogǎn), a region in Myanmar
