= Vedran =

- Pronunciation: [ʋědran]
- Gender: male

Origin
- Origin: Slavic
- Meaning: vedar ("clear, cheerful")

Other names
- Variant form: Vedrana {f}

Vedran is a Slavic masculine given name of Croatian origin, which is also used among Slovenes. Vedran means clear or cheerful.

== People ==
- Vedran Perič, a Slovenian famous account manager
- Vedran Celiščak, a Croatian footballer
- Vedran Ćorluka, a Croatian footballer
- Vedran Đipalo, a Croatian boxer
- Vedran Hamzić a.k.a. DJ Wedran, a DJ from Bosnia and Herzegovina
- Vedran Ivanković, a Bosnian football defender
- Vedran Janjetović, an Australian footballer
- Vedran Ješe, a Croatian footballer
- Vedran Lalić, a Croatian diplomat
- Vedran Kukoč, a Croatian professional football player
- Vedran Lovrenčić, winner of Big Brother 4 (Croatia), 2007
- Vedran Muratović, a Croatian football player
- Vedran Peršić, corporate communication expert from Bosnia and Herzegovina
- Vedran Purić, a Croatian footballer
- Vedran Rožić, a former Croatian football player
- Vedran Runje, a retired Croatian football goalkeeper
- Vedran Smailović, a musician from Bosnia and Herzegovina
- Vedran Turkalj, a Croatian football defender
- Vedran Vinko, a Slovenian football striker
- Vedran Zrnić, a Croatian handball player
