= Zvonko =

Name list

Zvonko (Serbian Cyrillic: Звонко) is a masculine given name. Notable people with the name include:

- Zvonko Bego (1940–2018), Croatian footballer
- Zvonko Bezjak (1935–2022), Croatian hammer thrower
- Zvonko Bogdan (born 1942), Serbian performer of traditional folk songs of Serbia, Croatia, Hungary and Romania
- Zvonko Bušić (1946–2013), Croatian emigrant, most known for the hijacking of TWA Flight 355 in 1976
- Zvonko Ivezić (1949–2016), Serbian footballer
- Zvonko Jazbec (1911–1970), Croatian football goalkeeper
- Zvonko Marković (born 1975), Serbian fashion designer
- Zvonko Milojević (born 1971), retired Serbian football goalkeeper
- Zvonko Monsider, Croatian football goalkeeper
- Zvonko Pamić (born 1991), Croatian professional footballer
- Zvonko Pantović, Serbian singer and songwriter
- Zvonko Strnad (1926–1979), Croatian football player
- Zvonko Šundovski, former team handball player from Republic of North Macedonia
- Zvonko Varga (born 1959), former Serbian/Yugoslav football manager and former player
- Zvonko Vranesic (born 1938), Croatian–Canadian International Master of chess
- Zvonko Živković (born 1959), Serbian footballer
- Zvonko Marković, Serbian fashion designer

== See also ==
- Zvonimir
