= Zrinko =

- Gender: male
- Language: Croatian

Origin
- Origin: Croatian, Slavic
- Meaning: from Zrin
- Region of origin: Croatia

Other names
- Variant form: Zrinoslav

Zrinko is a Slavic name of Croatian origin and is derived from the name of the place Zrin which is situated in the region of Banovina, Croatia.

This name may refer to:

- Zrinko Ogresta, a Croatian film director
- Zrinko Tutić, a Croatian songwriter

== See also ==
- Croatian name
- Slavic names
