= Kuniyoshi =

- Pronunciation: Kuniyoshi

Origin
- Origin: Japanese
- Region of origin: Japanese

Kuniyoshi (written: 国吉 or 國吉) is a Japanese surname. Notable people with the surname include:

- Fumio Kuniyoshi (国吉 史生, born 1985), Japanese-German rapper
- Takahiro Kuniyoshi (國吉 貴博; born 1988), Japanese footballer
- Yasuo Kuniyoshi (国吉 康雄; 1893–1953), American painter and photographer
- Yuki Kuniyoshi (国吉 佑樹; born 1991), Japanese baseball player

Kuniyoshi (written: 邦嘉, 邦佳, 邦栄, 国幹, 國義 or 國芳) is also a masculine Japanese given name. Notable people with the name include:

- Kuniyoshi Azuma (東 国幹; born 1968), Japanese politician
- Kuniyoshi Hironaka (弘中 邦佳; born 1976), Japanese mixed martial artist
- Kuniyoshi Kaneko (金子 國義; 1936–2015), Japanese painter, illustrator and photographer
- Kuniyoshi Obara (小原 國芳; 1887–1977), Japanese educational theorist and publisher
- Kuniyoshi Sakai (酒井 邦嘉), Japanese scientist
- Tamura Kuniyoshi (田村 邦栄; 1852–1887), Japanese daimyō
- Utagawa Kuniyoshi (歌川 國芳; 1798–1861), Japanese artist in woodblock printing and painting
- Prince Kuni Kuniyoshi (1873–1929), member of the Japanese imperial family and field marshal in the Imperial Japanese Army

== See also ==
- Domagoj, a Croatian given name of similar meaning
