= Hrvoje =

- Gender: male
- Language: Croatian

Origin
- Origin: Croatian, Slavic
- Meaning: Croat

Other names
- Variant forms: Hrvoja, Hrvojka (f), Hrvoj, Hrvoslav, Hrvatin (m)

Hrvoje is a Croatian male ethnic first name derived from "Hrvat" meaning "Croat". Notable people with the name include:

- Hrvoje Čale (born 1985), Croatian football back
- Hrvoje Ćustić (1983–2008), Croatian football midfielder
- Hrvoje Horvat (born 1946), Croatian handball back
- Hrvoje Klasić (born 1972), Croatian historian
- Hrvoje Kovačević (born 1982), Croatian football midfielder
- Hrvoje Panžić (born 1978), Croatian judoka
- Hrvoje Perić (born 1985), Croatian basketball forward
- Hrvoje Petek (born 1958), Croatian American physicist
- Hrvoje Šarinić (1935–2017), Croatian politician who served as Prime Minister
- Hrvoje Slovenc, (born 1976) Croatian-American fine-art photographer
- Hrvoje Vejić (born 1977), Croatian footballer
- Hrvoje Vukčić Hrvatinić (c. 1350–1416), Bosnian nobleman, duke of medieval Bosnia

== See also ==
- Slavic names
