= Čedomir Stojković =

Serbian lawyer and politician

Čedomir Stojković Чедомир Стојковић
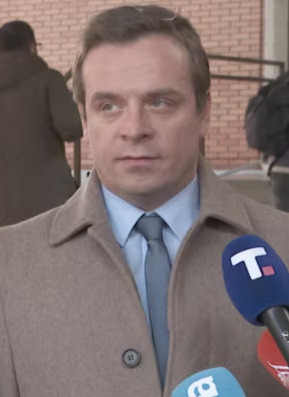
- Stojković in 2023

Personal details
- Born: 1982 (age 43–44) Belgrade, SR Serbia, SFR Yugoslavia
- Party: Independent; DHSS (earlier)
- Education: University of Belgrade
- Occupation: Lawyer, politician

Čedomir Stojković (Serbian Cyrillic: Чедомир Стојковић; born 1982) is a Serbian lawyer and politician. Once a prominent member and director of the Christian Democratic Party of Serbia (DHSS), he is currently the president of the October Group which advocates the introduction of sanctions against Russia by Serbia. He advocates Serbia's accession to NATO.

== Biography ==
He was born in 1982 in Belgrade. His parents are from the village of Mrčić near Valjevo. He graduated from the Faculty of Law at the University of Belgrade.

He was a prominent member and director of the Christian Democratic Party of Serbia (DHSS). On 11 November 2013 he opened the SIM NATO international student gathering, which gathered about a hundred participants from 50 countries in Belgrade. He then declared that Serbia, as a bridge between Europe and Asia, should become a member of NATO. The rally was interrupted by left-wing activists spreading anti-NATO banners.

He was the lawyer of actor and former DHSS member Branislav Lečić after Danijela Štajnfeld accused him of rape. He accused Štajnfeld of editing the recording of the conversation between her and Lečić.

He became known to the general public after the Russian invasion of Ukraine when his law office announced that it "independently imposed sanctions on the Russian Federation" and called on Serbia to impose sanctions on Russia. After a pro-Russian rally in Belgrade in March 2022, his office filed criminal charges against all the participants of this gathering. Together with Nenad Čanak, he visited Ukraine during the war.

In November 2022, he founded the Citizen's Association "October Group". The announcement stated that the goal of the organization is the fight against Vladimir Putin's regime in Serbia. Stojković coordinates the "team for the identification of Putin's agents in the Republic of Serbia", whose list includes numerous political and public figures such as Aleksandar Vulin, Vojislav Šešelj, Milomir Marić, Vuk Jeremić and Slobodan Antonić. He claimed that the Wagner Group was recruiting Serbian citizens for the war in Ukraine.

== Controversies ==
On 16 August 2014 he was detained in Valjevo after he was stopped by the traffic police on his way back from his wedding and refused to take a breathalyzer test and get out of the car. On that occasion he insulted the policeman. The judge sentenced Stojković to a fine of 95,000 dinars, an 11-month driving ban and 20 penalty points, and the Valjevo police filed a criminal complaint against him for insulting and obstructing police officers.

On the anniversary of Russia's invasion of Ukraine on February 24, 2023, he participated in a protest in front of the embassy of the Russian Federation in Belgrade and tried to deliver a cake with a skull and red frosting, symbolizing blood, to the Russian embassy. Stojković and the activists were prevented from doing so by the Serbian police.
