= Gojković =

Gojković (Cyrillic script: Гојковић) is a Serbian patronymic surname derived from the masculine given name Gojko. It may refer to:

- Duško Gojković (born 1931), Serbian jazz musician
- Predrag Gojković (1932–2017), Serbian singer
- Maja Gojković (born 1963), Serbian politician
- Janko Gojković (born 1973), Serbian swimmer
- Jovan Gojković (1975–2001), Serbian footballer
- Vladimir Gojković (born 1981), Serbian water polo player
- Aleksandar Gojković (born 1988), Serbian footballer
