= Ranković =

Ranković (Cyrillic script: Ранковић) is a Serbian patronymic surname derived from a masculine given name Ranko. Notable people with the surname include:

- Aleksandar Leka Ranković (1909–1983), leading Yugoslav Communist of Serbian origin
- Ljubiša Ranković (born 1973), former Serbian footballer
- Svetolik Ranković (1863–1899), Serbian writer
- Aleksandar Ranković (born 1978), Serbian footballer
- Zoran Ranković, Yugoslav footballer
