= Srećković =

Srećković (Serbian: Срећковић) is a Serbian surname derived from a masculine given name Srećko. It may refer to:

- Aleksandar Srećković (born 1981), footballer
- Nenad Srećković (born 1988), footballer
- Nikola Srećković (born 1996), footballer
- Panta Srećković (1834–1903), historian
- Srđan Srećković (born 1974), politician
