= Desimir =

Desimir (Serbian: Десимир) is a Serbian masculine given name, derived from desiti meaning "to happen", and the common mir meaning "peace". It may refer to:

- Desimir Žižović, Yugoslav comics artist, Mirko and Slavko
- Desimir Gajić, coach for Sonja Stolić
- Desimir Stanojević, Serbian actor, Srećni ljudi

== See also ==
- Desimirovac
- Desa (monarch)
- Desislav
- Dejan
