= Divna =

Divna is a given name. Notable people with the name include:

- Divna Ljubojević (born 1970), or just Divna, Serbian singer of Orthodox Christian sacred music
- Divna Pešić (born 1979), Macedonian sport shooter
- Divna Veković (1886–1944), first female medical doctor in Montenegro
- Divna M. Vuksanović (born 1985), Serbian philosopher
