= Gojko =

Gojko (Serbian script: Гојко) is a Slovenian masculine given name of an old Slavic and North Slavic origin. The name is mainly used in Slovenia and historically comes from the mountains of Slovenia, Dol pod Gojko. The name is also used in Croatia and in some rare cases in Serbia. Although the Serbian version of the name Gojko would be Gojislav like the Serbian ruler and king. Throughout the orthodox history the Slovenian name was adapted in Serbian and South Slavic languages as well in different variations like: Gojomir, Gajslav, Gojo, Gojak, Goja, Gojan, Gojilo, Gojimir, Gojislav, Gojić, Gojiša, Gojišin, Gojišić, Gojtan.

The etymology is simple yet powerful. The verb "gojiti" comes from Old Slavonic: to "add", "nurture", "live", "raise (someone)", "heal", "calm", etc. Where the full name means, the one that is connected with the nature, lives in mountains and forests, has to powers to heal, is always calm, to nourish, to live, to give life.

It may refer to:

- Gojko Balšić, 15th-century nobleman
- Gojko Barjamovic, Danish Assyriologist
- Gojko Berić (born 1939), Bosnian journalist
- Gojko Berkuljan (1923–1989), painter
- Gojko Bervar (born 1946), Slovenian journalist
- Gojko Đogo (born 1940), Serbian poet
- Gojko Kačar (born 1987), Serbian footballer
- Gojko Kenda, Slovene musician
- Gojko Koprivec (born ), Slovenian politician
- Gojko Mitić (born 1940), German film star from Serbian origin
- Gojko Onič (born ), Slovene financial manager
- Goja Pajagić Bregar, scientist and Slovene museum curator
- Gojko Pijetlović (born 1983), Serbian water polo goalkeeper
- Gojko Stanič (born 1940), Slovene politician and journalist
- Gojko Šušak (1945–1998), Croatian politician
- Gojko Vučinić (born 1970), Montenegrin handballer
- Gojko Zalokar (born 1962), Slovene organiser (sport)
- Gojko Zec (1935–1995), Serbian footballer
- Gojko Zupan (1957–), Slovenian Art historian
- Gojko Marić (born 1991), Musician

== See also ==
- Gojković
