= Ranko =

Ranko is a Slavic and Japanese given name.

== People ==
People with the name Ranko include:

=== Slavic name "Ranko" (Cyrillic script: Ранко) ===
- Ranko Borozan, footballer
- Ranko Despotović, Serbian footballer
- Ranko Đorđić, Serbian football player and manager
- Ranko Golijanin, footballer
- Ranko Krivokapić, Speaker of the Parliament of Montenegro and the President of the Social Democratic Party of Montenegro
- Ranko Marinković, Croatian novelist and dramatist
- Ranko Markovic, film and television producer
- Ranko Matasović, Croatian linguist
- Ranko Moravac, footballer
- Ranko Ostojić, Croatian politician
- Ranko Petković (born 1947), Bosnian and Yugoslav footballer
- Ranko Popović, Serbian football player/coach
- Ranko Radović, architect
- Ranko Stojić, footballer
- Ranko Veselinović, footballer
- Ranko Žeravica, Serbian basketball coach
- Ranko Zirojević, footballer

=== Japanese name "Ranko" ===
Written 乱子,蘭子,らんこ,ランコ

- Ranko Hanai (1918–1961), actress
- Ranko Kanbe (神戸 蘭子; born 1982), Japanese fashion model, television personality and singer

== Fictional Characters ==
- Ranko, an alternate persona for Ranma Saotome in Ranma ½
- Ranko, a character from A Mother Should Be Loved
- Ranko, a character from SS
- Ranko, a gorilla who features in the Tintin adventure The Black Island by Hergé
- Ranko Yagyuu, a character from Fūma no Kojirō
- Ranko Saōji, a character from Sankarea: Undying Love
- Ranko Saegusa, a character from Binbō Shimai Monogatari
- Ranko Mikogami, a secondary character in Sky Girls
- Ranko Midorikawa, a character from Aim for the Ace!
- Ranko Hata, a character from Seitokai Yakuindomo
- Ranko Kanzaki, a character from The Idolmaster Cinderella Girls

== See also ==
- Isolepis ranko (I. ranko), see List of Isolepis species
- Ranković
