= Kazimir =

Kazimir may refer to:

== People ==
- Kazimir, a variant of Casimir, a given name
- Mikhail Kazimir (born 2001), Russian footballer
- Peter Kažimír (born 1968), Slovak economist and former politician
- Róbert Kažimír (born 1978), Slovak figure skater

== Places ==
- Kazimír, Slovakia
