= Davorin Savnik =

Slovenian architect

Davorin Savnik (7 September 1929 – 14 April 2014) was a Slovenian industrial designer and architect.

Savnik's work includes designing audiovisual and telecommunication devices, electro technical and electro-medical equipment, hand tools, household appliance and computer equipment. He lectured at universities domestically and abroad.

In 1966, Savnik was awarded the Prešeren Fund Award. In 1979, he received the BIO and Stuttgart Design center recognition awards, and later the highest prize of the Japanese Ministry for Trade and Industry, as well as the gold medal of the trade fair in Brno. He was also awarded at the International Fair in Hannover.

The most recognizable devices in his collection of design works were telephones. His most renowned work was the ETA 80 telephone of 1978, which soon became a recognized standard in households and offices in Slovenia and worldwide. Telephones were produced by the Iskra concern in Kranj. More than five million ETA phone devices were made in Kranj alone, and it can still be found in many homes.

The telephone has become highly recognized abroad as well, and received many distinctions for its aesthetic form, including a Good Design Award. It has been adopted as part of the permanent exhibition of outstandingly designed modern products at the Museum of Modern Art in Munich, the Museum of Modern Art (MoMA) in New York City, and Ljubljana Architecture Museum in Ljubljana.

Savnik's idea was copied by numerous manufacturers around the world, in a total output of an estimated 300 million pieces. Articles and pictures portraying the telephone have been published by Japanese, American, British, Russian, Czech and Croatian professional journals and newspapers.

Davorin Savnik died in 2014, aged 85.
