= Desislav =

- Gender: masculine

Origin
- Language: Slavic
- Meaning: "one that finds glory/fame"
- Region of origin: Bulgaria

Other names
- Derived: desiti (to find, to encounter) and slava (glory, fame)

Desislav or Dessislav (Bulgarian: Десислав) is a Bulgarian masculine given name, derived from the Slavic elements desiti (to find, to encounter) and slava (glory, fame), thus meaning "one that finds glory". It is traditionally found in Bulgaria.

Notable people with the name include:

- Desislav Chukolov (born 1974), Bulgarian politician
- Desislav Gunev (born 1986), Bulgarian sprinter
- Desislav Rusev (born 1979), Bulgarian footballer

== See also ==
- Desislava, female variant of the name
