= Desislava Petrova =

Desislava Petrova a.k.a. Soldier
- Born: Desislava Dobreva Petrova; 12 December 1980 (age 45)
- Origin: Sofia, Bulgaria
- Occupation: activist

Desislava Dobreva Petrova (Bulgarian: Десислава Добрева Петрова; born 12 December 1980) is a Bulgarian gay rights activist and former president of BGO Gemini - Bulgaria's largest LGBT rights organization. She has struggled for equal rights for LGBT people since 2000.

As chair of the Bulgarian gay organization Gemini, the oldest and only national membership LGBT rights-based NGO in Bulgaria, Petrova has been responsible for the overall management of the organization. Her personal dedication and efforts to the LGBT community have driven the organization towards its development as a national LGBT rights defender. On 19 January 2001, she came out as a lesbian on the central news on the Bulgarian National Television. Petrova was the first publicly visible lesbian in Bulgaria, talking about LGBT rights. She is well-known for campaigning in favor of anti-discrimination legislation and registered partnership.

Petrova has also been involved in work groups for development of new laws, national plans and proposals for changes in the Bulgarian and EU legislation (Amendment of the Bulgarian Penal Code and development of the Bulgarian Act for Protection Against Discrimination, development of Law for Registered Partnership). Petrova is also co-anchor and host of the first ever radio broadcast, which discusses the problems of the LBGT community in Bulgaria.

Petrova is also an independent environmentalist and was arrested during a protest on 2 July 2007 together with 35 other activists defending the Natural Park "Strandja". Around 500 blockaded the crossroad of Orlov Most (Eagle's Bridge) in the center of Bulgaria's capital.

== Articles ==
- Global Gayz
- Reading Room: Discrimination and homophobia endures in Sofia
- ALL SIDES: Changing a mentality takes years. Keeping an open mind does not.
- FROM ALL SIDES: Misrepresented, misunderstood
