= Čedomir Božić =

Serbian politician (1984–2024)

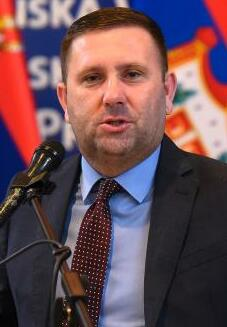
Božić in 2022

Čedomir Božić (Serbian Cyrillic: Чедомир Божић; 19 October 1984 – 20 December 2024) was a Serbian politician. From October 2022 until his death, he was the head of the Autonomous Province of Vojvodina's office in Brussels, Belgium. Previously, he was the mayor of Žabalj from 2012 to 2020 and the minister of agriculture, water management, and forestry in the government of Vojvodina from 2020 to 2022. Originally elected as a Democratic Party (DS) representative, Božić was a member of the Serbian Progressive Party (SNS) from 2016 until his death.

== Early life and education ==
Božić was born in Novi Sad, in what was then the Socialist Autonomous Province of Vojvodina in the Socialist Republic of Serbia, Socialist Federal Republic of Yugoslavia. He was educated in Čurug and Bečej and graduated from the faculty of economics at the University of Novi Sad in Subotica (2008).

== Political career ==
Božić began working in the municipal administration of Žabalj in 2009.

=== Mayor of Žabalj ===
Božić received the second position on the Democratic Party's electoral list for Žabalj in the 2012 Serbian local elections. The list won seven out of thirty-one seats. The local assembly was extremely divided following the election, with no party in a dominant position, and the Democratic Party was ultimately able to form a coalition government with Božić in the role of mayor. At the time of his inauguration, he was the youngest mayor in Serbia. The Democrats initially governed in an alliance with the Socialist Party of Serbia (SPS), but that party went into opposition later in the year and its place was taken by Rich Serbia (BS). By 2014, the local administration also included the League of Social Democrats of Vojvodina (LSV), United Serbia (JS), New Serbia (NS), the Party of United Pensioners of Serbia (PUPS), the Democratic Party of Serbia (DSS), and the Serbian Radical Party (SRS).

The DS experienced a serious split in 2014, with several members joining Boris Tadić's breakaway New Democratic Party (NDS). In March 2014, Božić announced that the entire DS board in Žabalj was collectively joining Tadić's party. He returned to the DS in February 2015, however, saying that it was the only genuine pro-European opposition party in the country. The reconciliation proved brief, and he left the DS for a second time in February 2016.

Božić led an independent list called Our Municipality of Žabalj in the 2016 Serbian local elections and won nine seats, finishing second against the Progressive Party. He and his group collectively joined the Progressives in May 2016, and he was confirmed for a second term as mayor shortly thereafter. He later led the Progressives to a majority victory in the 2020 local elections, winning fifteen out of twenty-one seats in a reduced assembly. He was appointed for a third term as mayor in September 2020, although his term was cut short by his appointment to the provincial ministry the following month.

Božić highlighted a number of local infrastructure projects that his administration was overseeing in a 2017 sponsored interview.

=== Provincial cabinet minister ===
On 29 October 2020, Božić was appointed minister of agriculture, water management, and forestry in the provincial administration of Igor Mirović. In an interview published in January 2021, he indicated that his department had a budget of close to seven billion dinars and that his priorities would be small and medium-sized farms and co-operation with local governments.

=== Provincial representative ===
Božić was re-assigned as the leader of Vojvodina's provincial representative office in Brussels in October 2022.

== Death ==
Božić died of a heart attack in Brussels, on 20 December 2024, at the age of 40.
