= Mrčić =

- Village (Selo)
- Location within Serbia
- Coordinates: 44°5′N 19°53′E
- Country: Serbia
- District: Kolubara District
- Municipality: Valjevo

Population (2002)
  - Total: 192
- Time zone: UTC+1 (CET)
  - Summer (DST): UTC+2 (CEST)

Mrčić is a village in the municipality of Valjevo, Serbia. According to the 2002 census, the village has a population of 192 people.

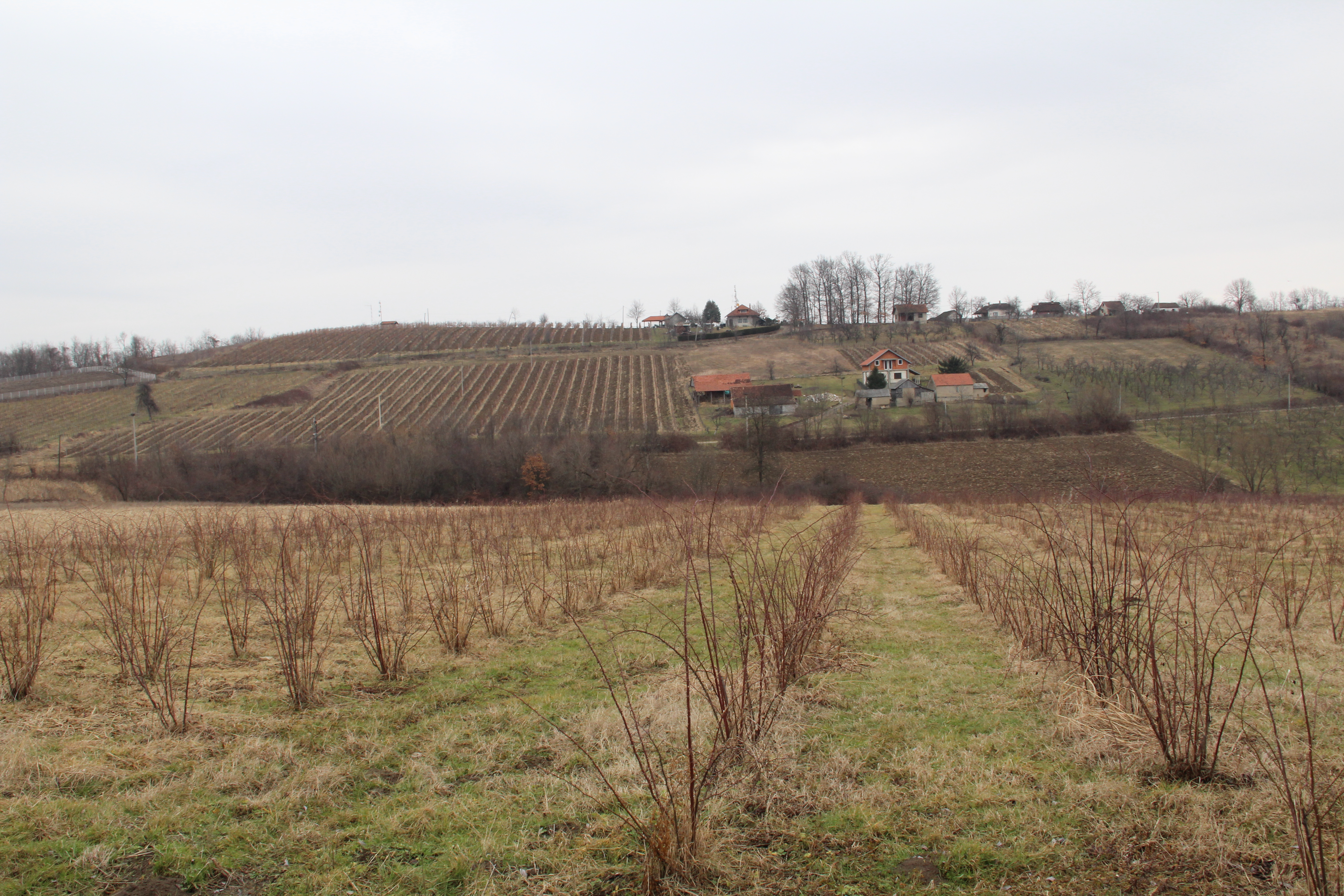
Mrcic village - panorama

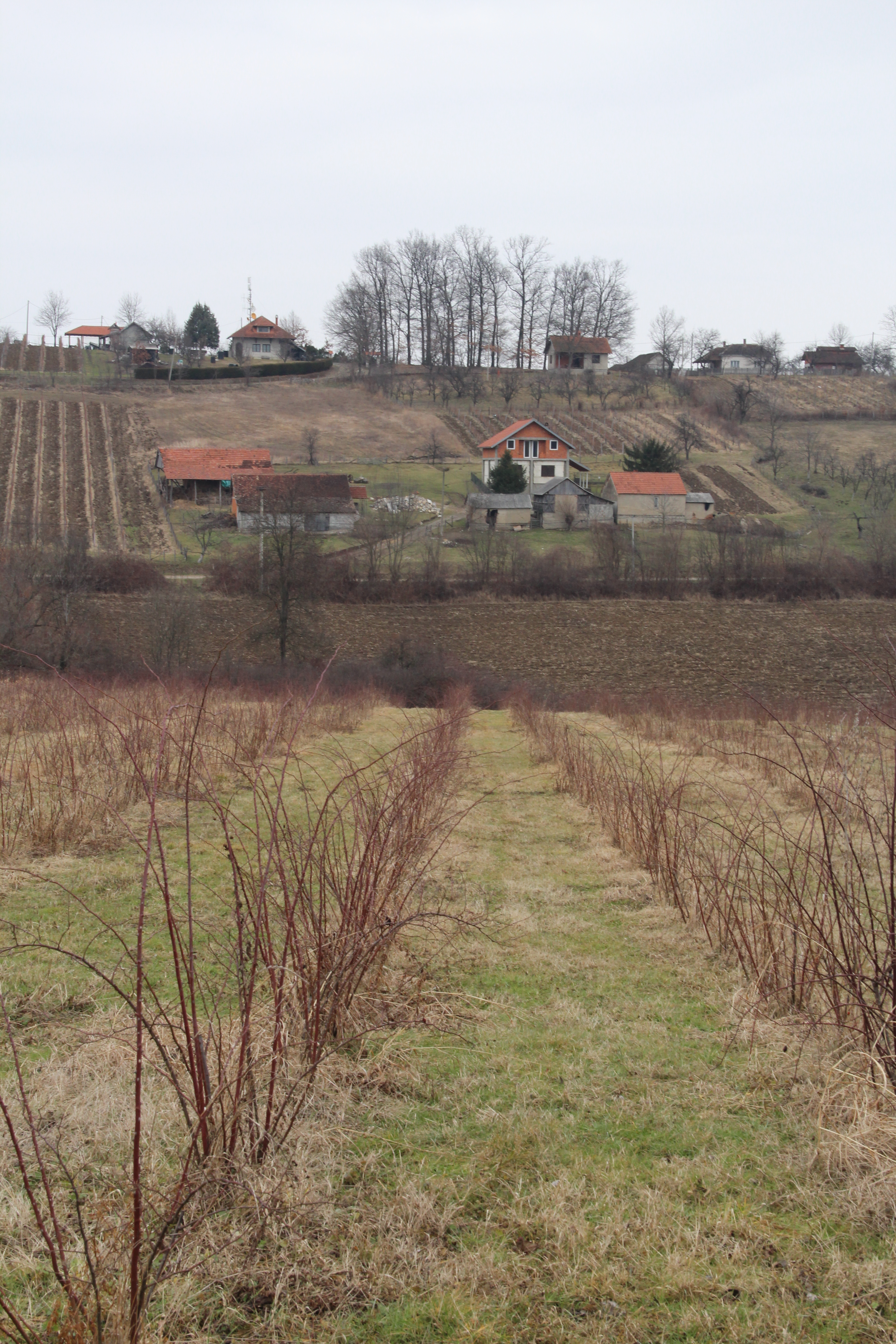
Mrcic village - panorama

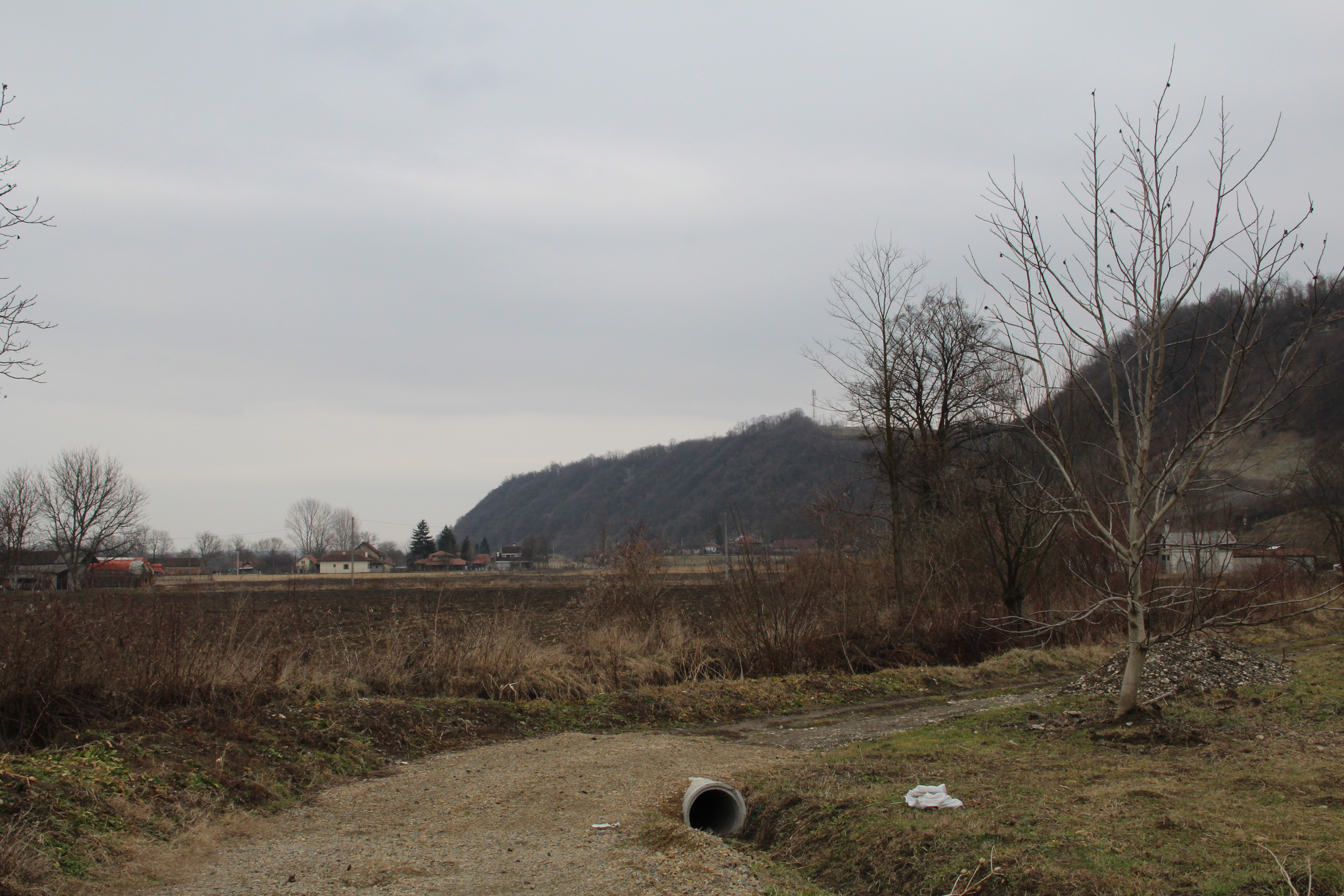
Mrcic village - panorama

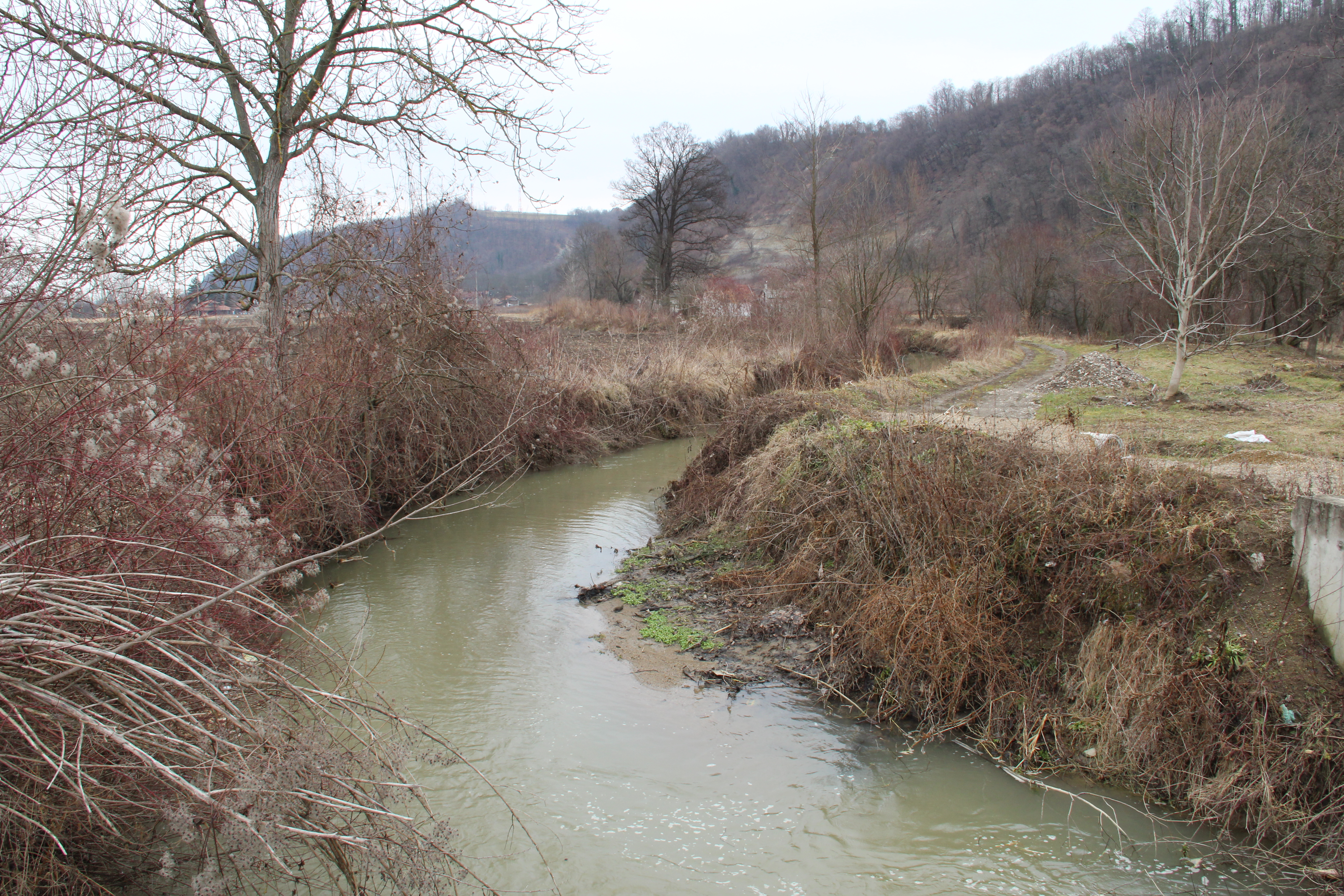
Mrcic village - panorama - river Banja

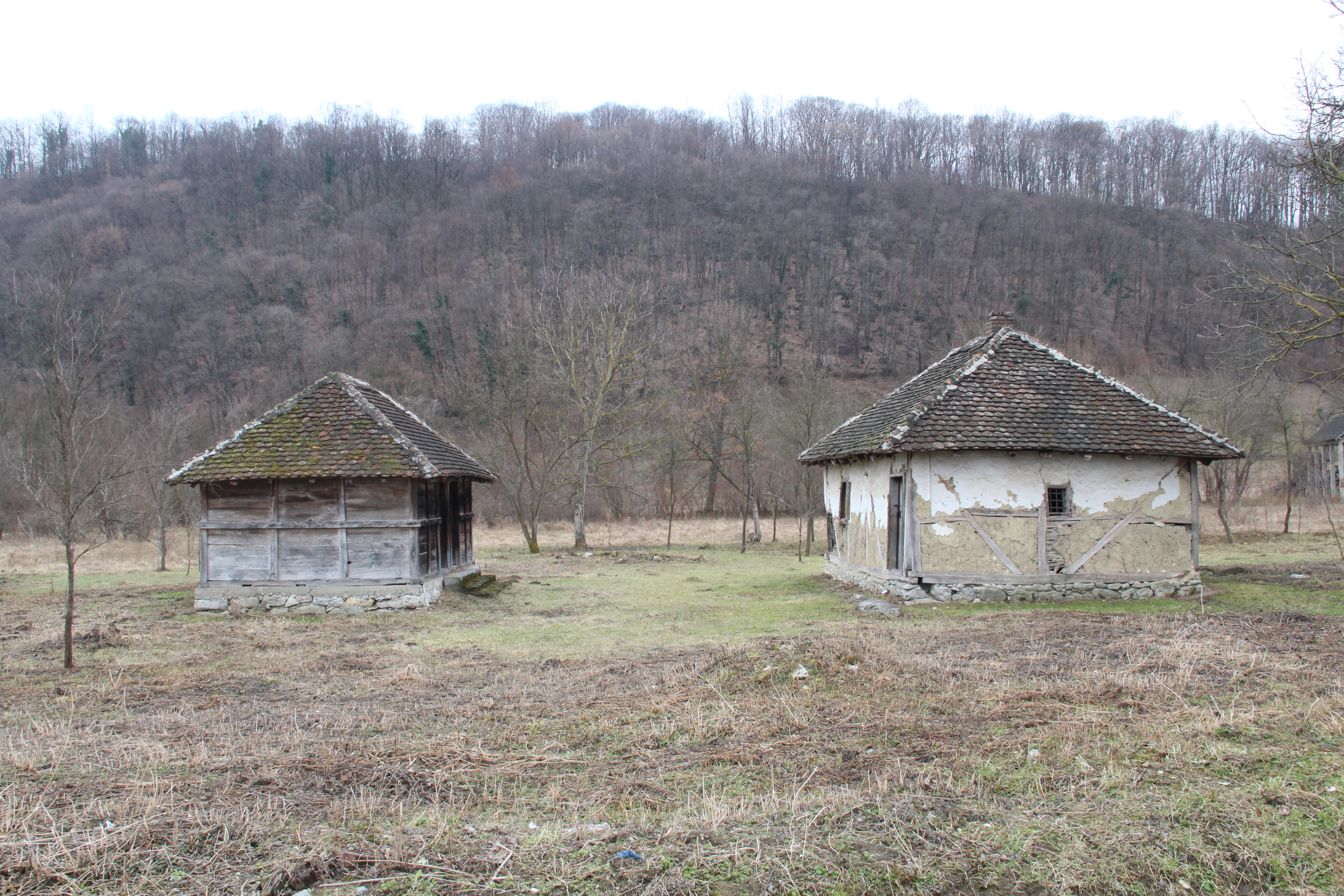
Mrcic village - old rural home

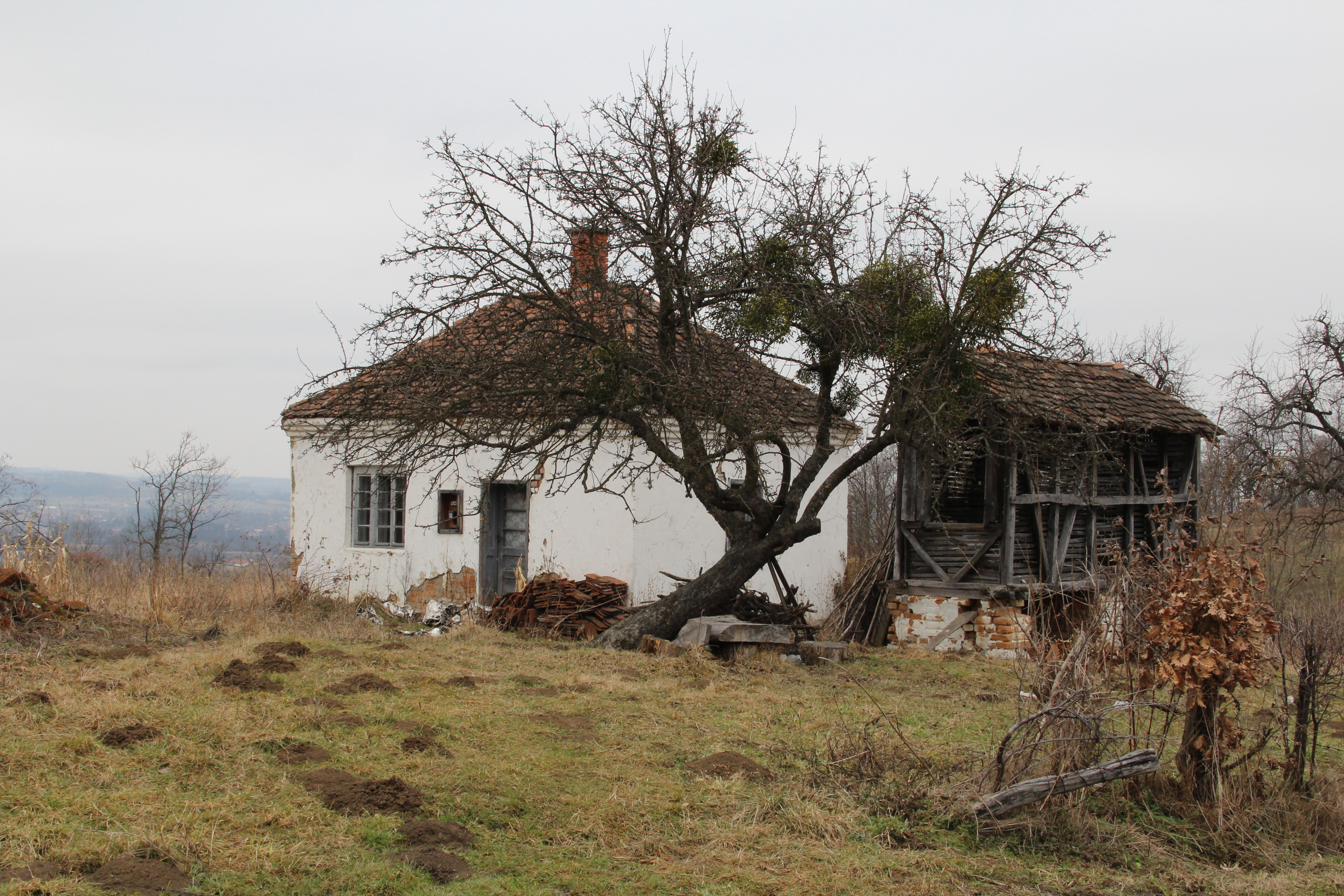
Mrcic village - old rural home

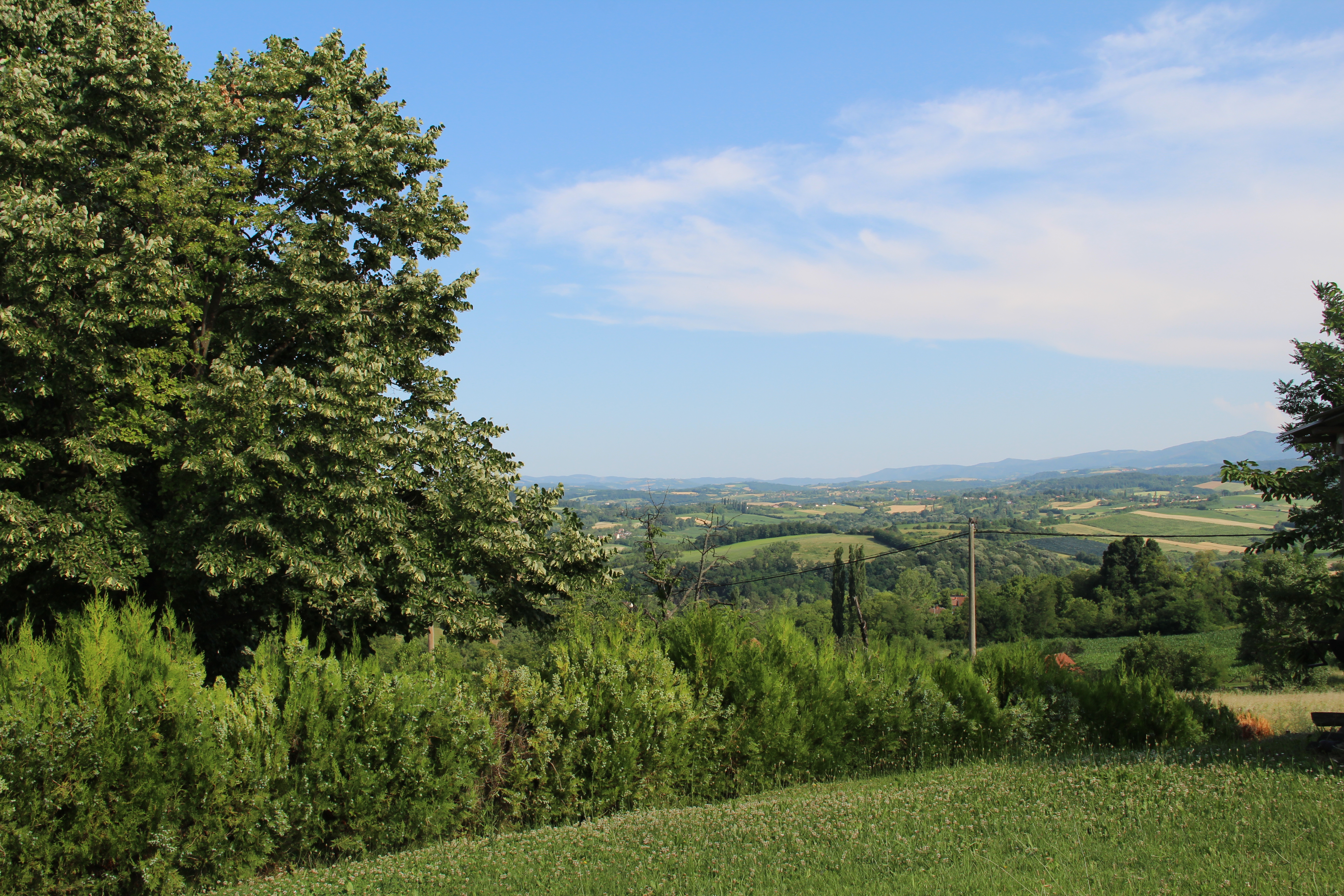
Mrcic - panorama

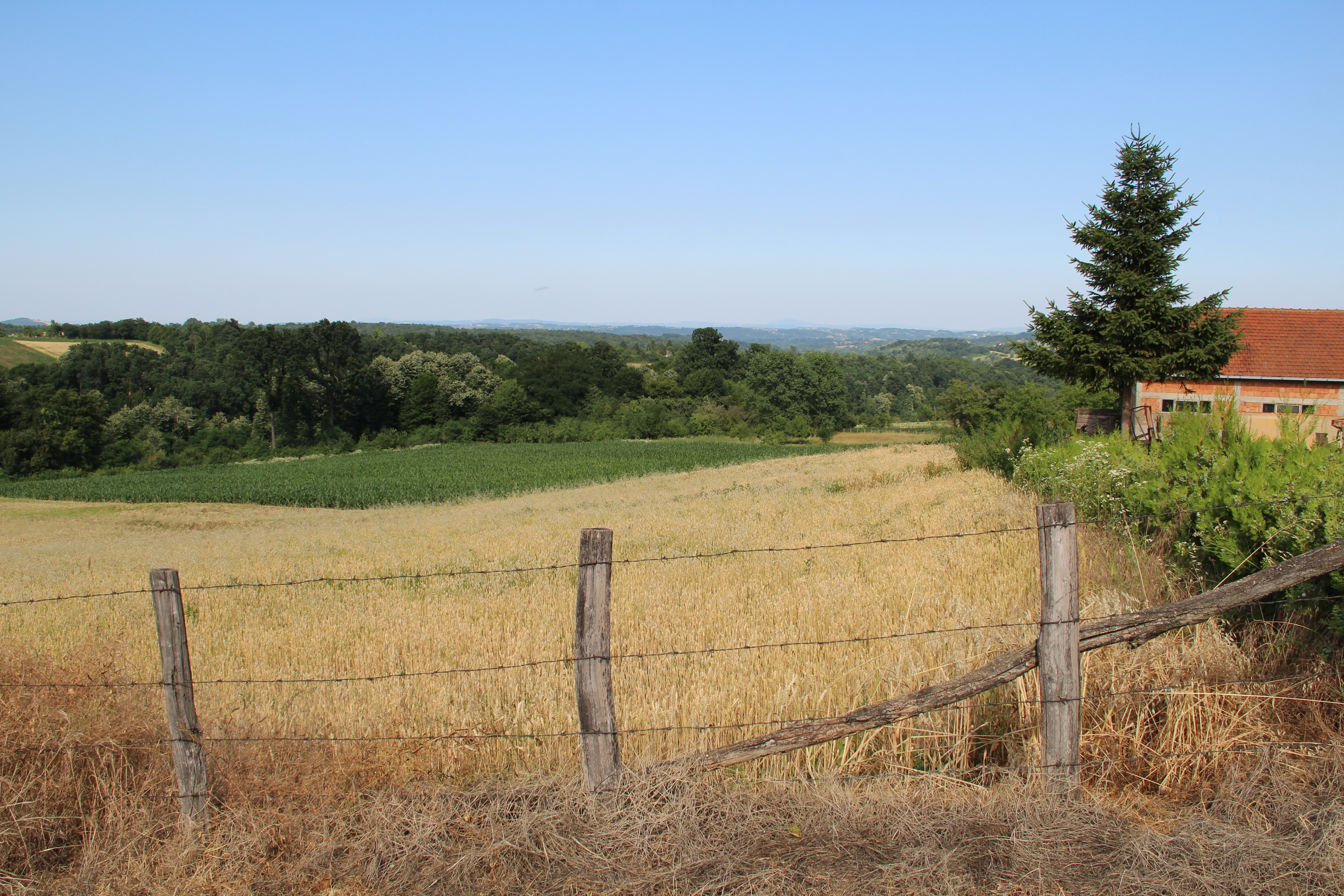
Mrcic - panorama

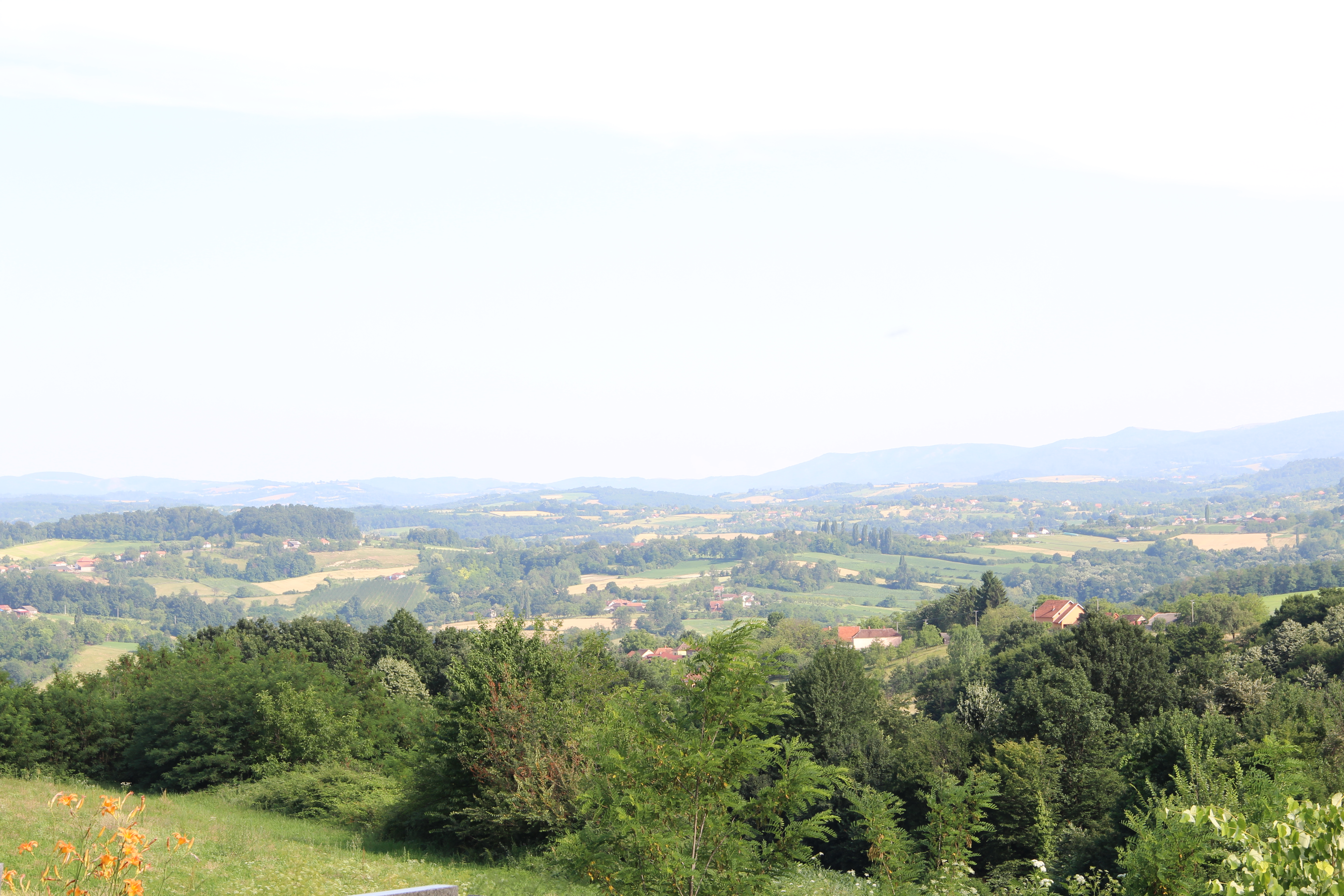
Mrcic - panorama

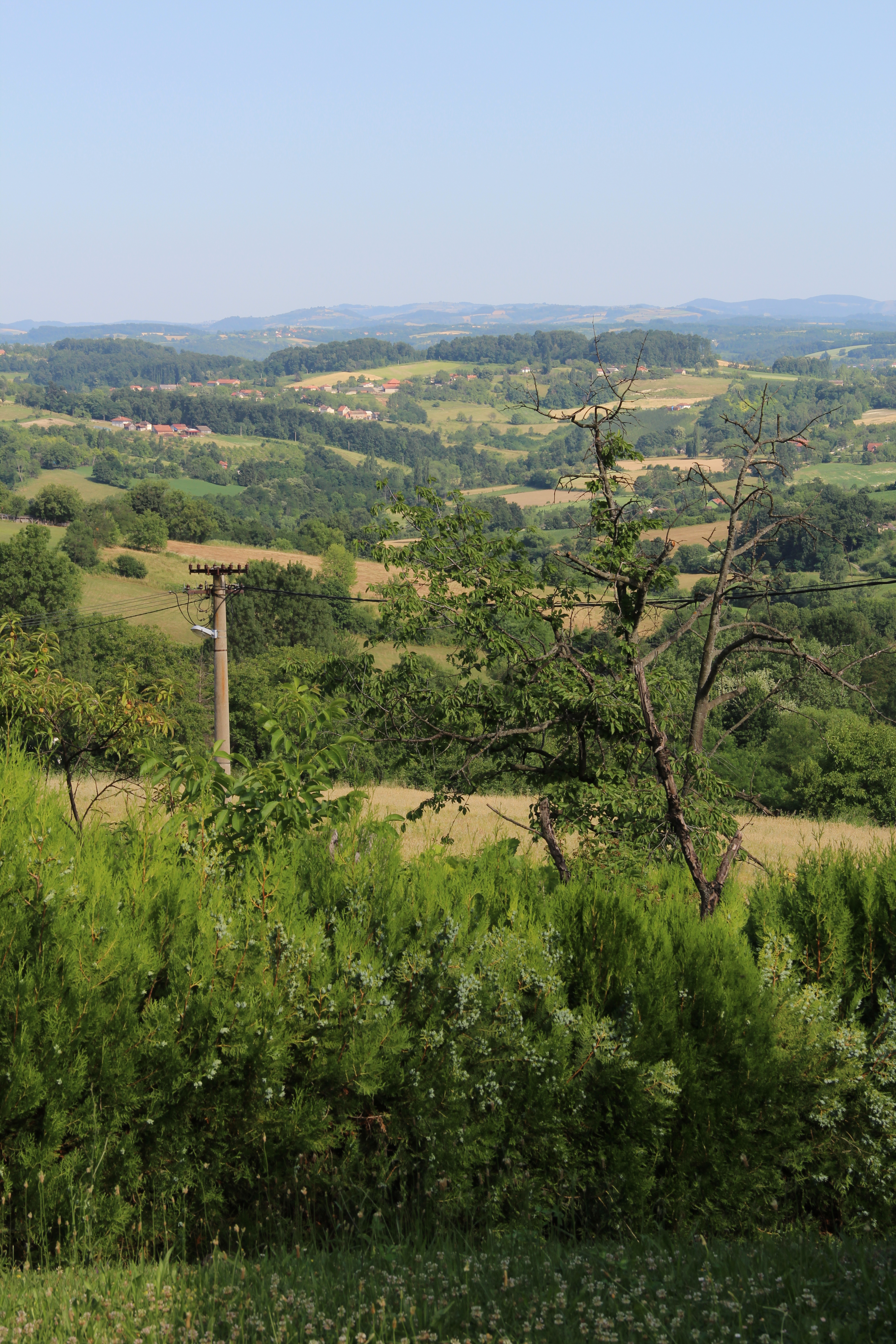
Mrcic - panorama

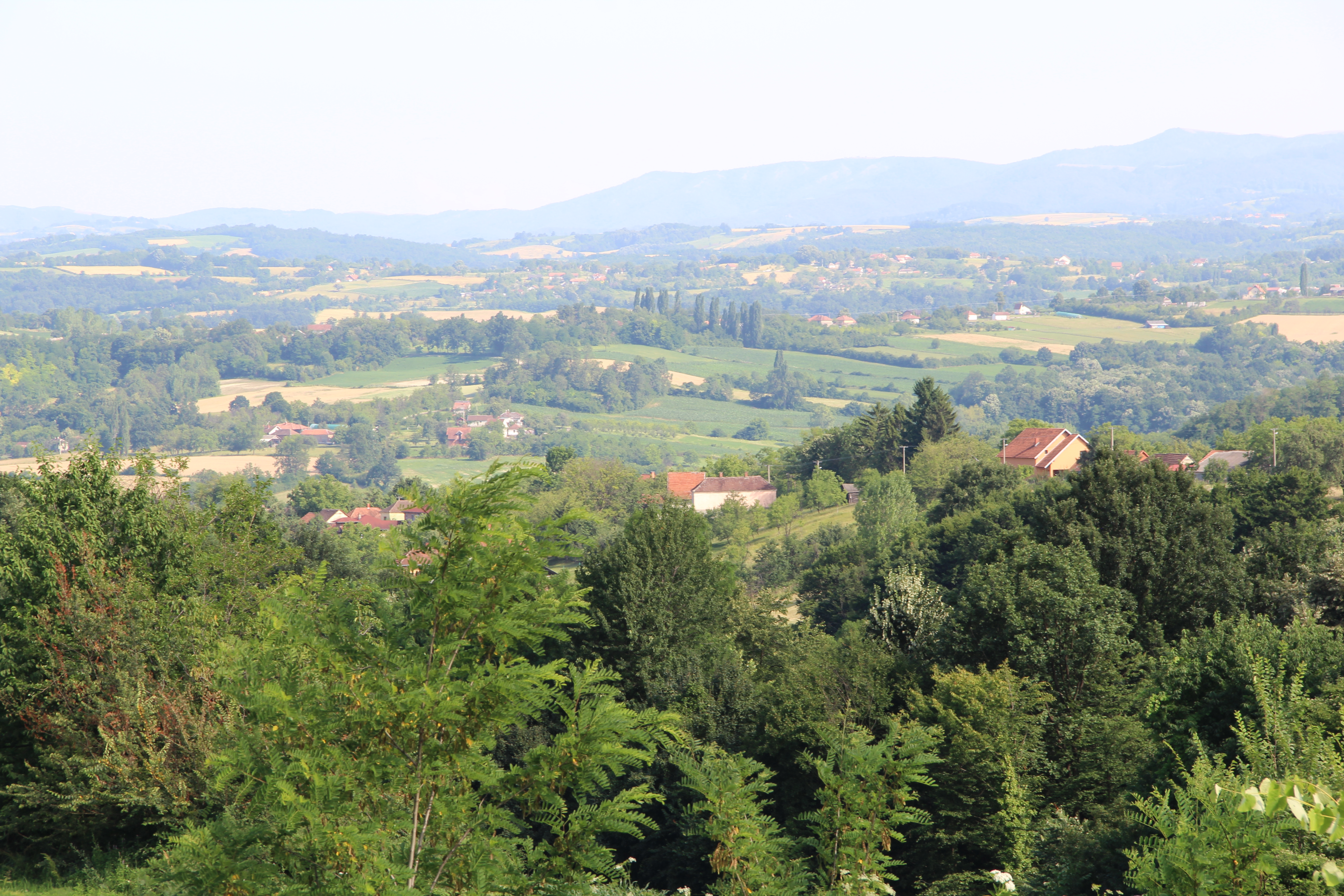
Mrcic - panorama
