= Hrvoje Slovenc =

Croatian photographer (born 1976)

- Born: November 22, 1976, Zagreb, Croatia
- Education: Yale School of Art (MFA); The City College of New York (BA); Zagreb University (MS)
- Known for: Photography, film, multimedia
- Notable work: -Smile of an Alligator (short film) -Croatian Rhapsody: Borderlands -Marble Hill (chapters: Home Theater, Harry Black, Portraits and Marble Hill) -Breathing in Kabwe -Partners in Crime

Hrvoje Slovenc (born 1976, Zagreb, Croatia) is a Croatian-American photographer and filmmaker based in New York City. He holds an MFA in photography from Yale University School of Artand MS in biochemistry from the University of Zagreb.

His recent short film Smile of an Alligator (Producer, Editor) was awarded Best International Short and Best Young Actor at the New Jersey Film Awards. It is also included in Berlin Indie Film Festival official selection.

His photographs have been exhibited in dozens of shows nationally and internationally, including the Museum of Contemporary Photography in Chicago; Museum of New Art in Detroit; Bronx Museum of the Arts; Museum of Contemporary Art in Zagreb, Croatia; Museum of Modern and Contemporary Art in Rijeka, Croatia; and the Young Artists' Biennial in Bucharest, Romania.

Slovenc's work is in the permanent collection of the Museum of Contemporary Photography in Chicago, as well as the Museum of Contemporary Art and the Museum of Arts and Crafts in Zagreb, Croatia.

Slovenc was part of the Light Work and AIM residency program at the Bronx Museum of the Arts. Slovenc has been a visiting artist at institutions including Drew University, City College of New York, LaGuardia Community College, Yale University, and Parsons The New School of Design.

== Major works ==
Since 2007, Slovenc has completed several major bodies of work and exhibited them internationally. Since 2023, he works exclusively in film. His latest photography project, Croatian Rhapsody: Borderlands, broaches the turbulent past of Slovenc's homeland, specifically the Croatian War of Independence (1991–1995) and its aftermath, as Slovenc investigates issues of identity through the lens of someone who left his country at a time of unrest and rebuilding and now returns to experience his birthplace as at once familiar and alienating.
In his project Marble Hill, which consists of four distinct chapters, Slovenc focuses on his neighborhood in the Bronx. He uses photography, sculpture, set design, performance, and video to transform the real Bronx neighborhood into the author's imaginary and metaphorical world nested between fantasy and reality. Slovenc is interested in life as a form of theater, particularly in ways domestic spaces have been acted in and acted upon. He is intrigued by the "scenes" people construct in their homes, as well as the roles people play in their daily lives, with all the semiotic and allegoric referents.
In the series Partners in Crime, Slovenc creates wedding portraits of long-term same-sex couples. Inspired by late nineteenth-century cabinet cards, Slovenc photographs these couples to appear both physically and emotionally disconnected. In conflating images of stiff, traditional marriage poses and contemporary domestic spaces, Slovenc captures the public face that society mandates for same-sex couples.
For the series Breathing in Kabwe, Slovenc traveled to Kabwe, Zambia, to photograph the effects of lead pollution on the local population. With photographs and text, Slovenc has transformed a typical documentary subject matter in such a way that it has become not only about the observed or the observer as individual entities, not about "us" or "them" as two very distinct cultures, but primarily about the relationship between the two.

=== Smile of an Alligator, short film, Producer and Editor (2025) ===
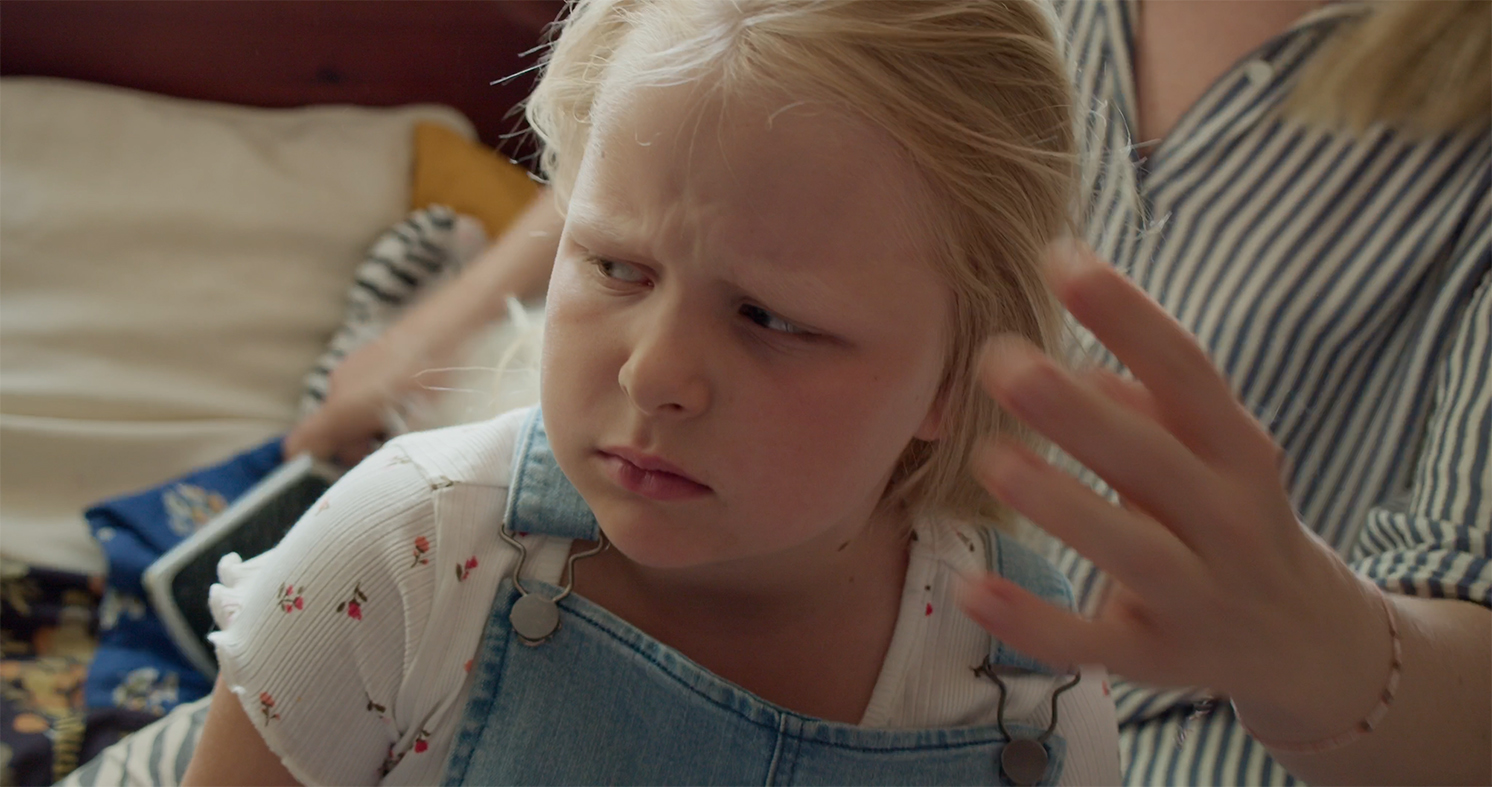
Still from Smile of an Alligator.

Smile of an Alligator follows one day in the strained relationship between an Estonian immigrant mother and her Finnish daughter in Helsinki. The single mom, Laura, is unemployed and wants to return home, while her daughter, Mai, feels isolated and disconnected from her. Mai spends most days by herself or with her best friend Stella wandering around the city. When Mai returns, any small thing can set Laura off again. This is a cycle they can't seem to break. The film is made with non-actors in the manner of improvisational cinema, and it blends elements of documentary realism and fictional narrative.
Awards and Film Festivals:
- 2026 Berlin Indie Film Festival, Official selection
- 2025 New Jersey Film Awards, WINNER: Best International Short & Best Young Actor

=== Croatian Rhapsody: Borderlands (2014–2017) ===
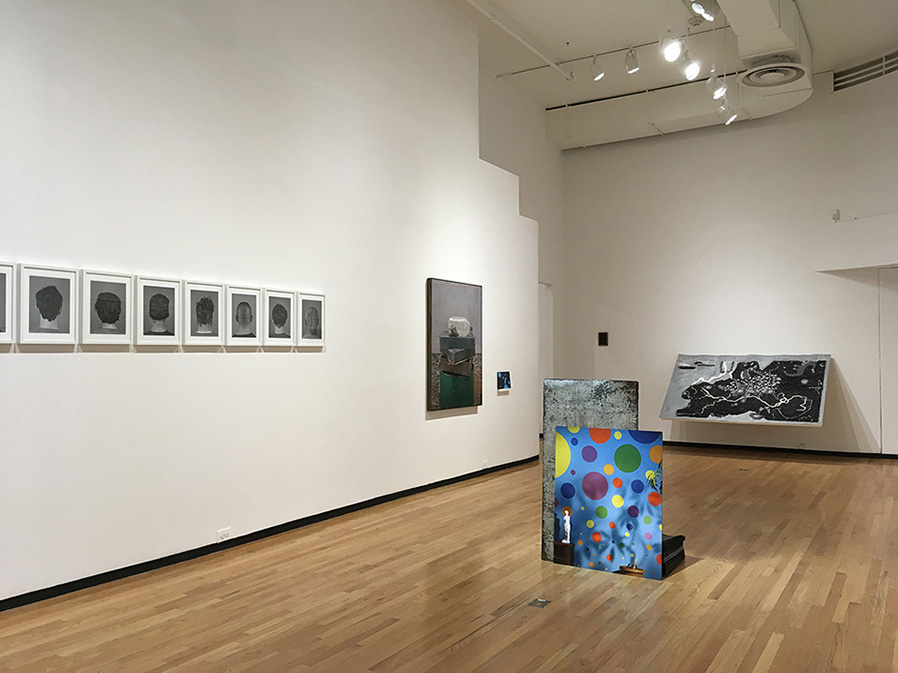
Installation view, Museum of Contemporary Photography, Chicago.

Croatian Rhapsody: Borderlands is a multimedia project that consists of photographs, photo collages, videos, text, works on paper, fabric art and photogravures. Historically, the rhapsodic tradition anticipates the theme of a return-to-homeland and as such it complicates notions of national identity. Either as a work of epic poetry or as an instrumental composition, rhapsody affords an artist a break from conventional expressions of nationality in the way it references, literally, a "stitched song." That is to say a rhapsody is fragmented, never seamless.
Slovenc visits locations that hold great historical or personal significance, and create images in his studio in order to paint a picture of contemporary Croatia. The world that is portrayed becomes a pastiche of stitched moments that fuse art genres and formal conventions, resulting in a perspective that is splintered, a site of violence, exposed and vulnerable, beaten and brutalized.
As an immigrant who spent the last fourteen years of his life outside of his homeland, Slovenc wonders, If he were to rhapsodize about Croatia visually, what might that mean? Would he be like Homer's epic hero, or some contemporary version thereof, who returns after being away for many years, only to find the place is unrecognizable? For the Homeric hero, nothing is as he remembered; everything has changed. His world is literally covered in mist. It is a fraught experience, this double gesture of identification and alienation.
Finally, these works point to something far more universal than the specificities of national politics or geo-historical coordinates. In a world with over 200 million international immigrants, redefining the meanings of national identity and cultural identification becomes an inevitable global process.
The project is partially funded by the Foundation for Contemporary Arts Emergency Grant.

=== Marble Hill (2010–2013) ===
This complex body of work consists of four chapters: "Home Theater", "Harry Black", "Portraits" and "Marble Hill". Marble Hill is a real neighborhood in the Bronx where Slovenc resides. The name also evokes a fantastical place reminiscent of a fairy tale. In this world, domestic spaces look like stage sets and intimate relationships are mere illusions created for a camera. Even moments of great tragedies appear to be theatrical. In each chapter, Slovenc uses different visual language to present daily life as a hyperreal, scripted construct.

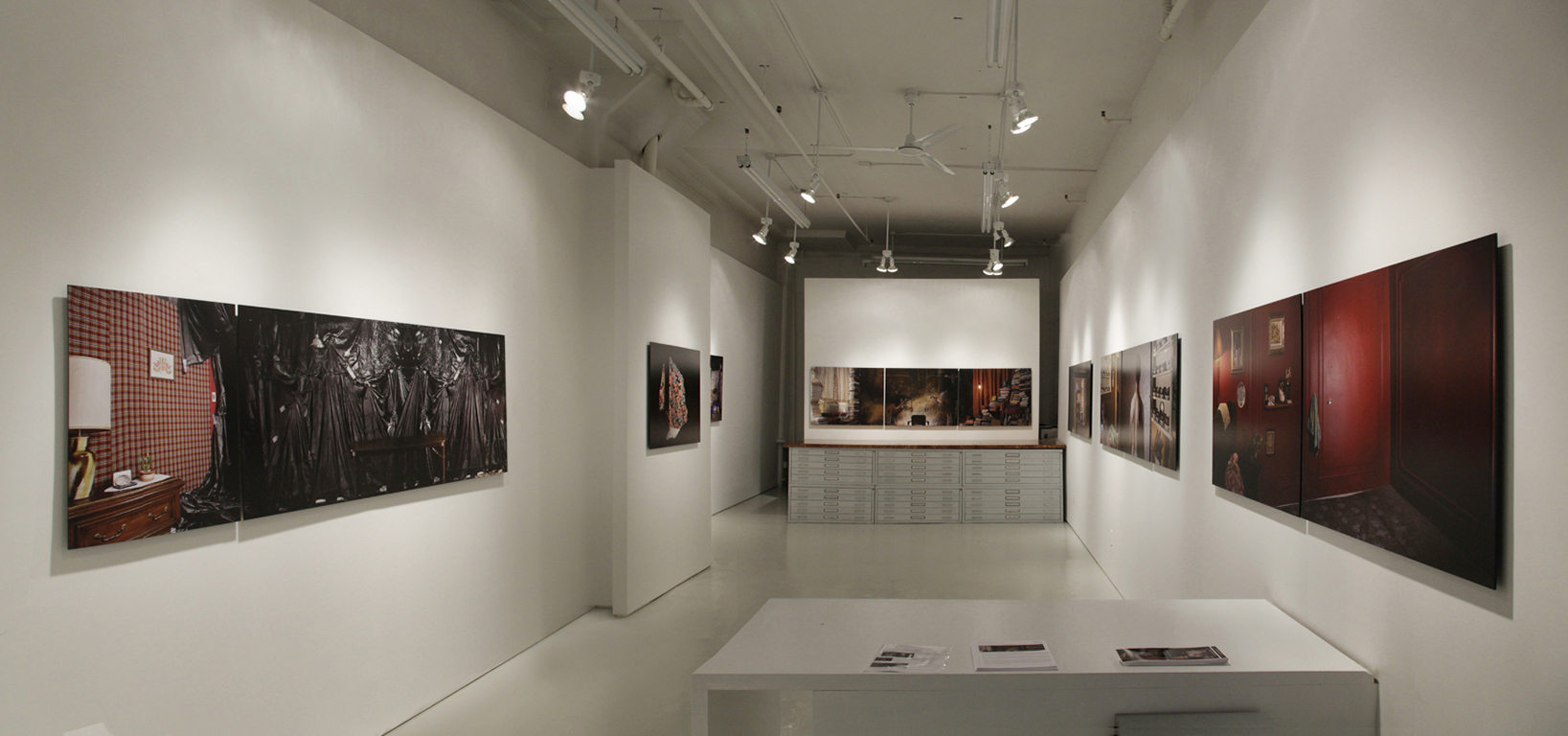
Installation view at Michael Mazzeo Gallery. New York. March, 2011.

==== Chapter I: Home Theater (2010) ====
In "Home Theater", Slovenc photographs domestic spaces in which sadomasochistic sex acts are taking place. These images grew out of his personal experience in which he solicited people on numerous sex websites where he presented himself as an S&M practitioner. Even though the images are of the actual, lived-in domestic spaces, they appear to be artificial, hyperreal, grand, and with a slightly distorted perspective, as if constructed as sets for a movie or a play. Slovenc is interested in the performance aspect of daily life. What particularly fascinates him is the idea of a domestic space as a "scene" in which daily routines are performed. By photographing the homes of S&M practitioners in particular, and by contrasting the performance spaces with traditional domestic spaces, Slovenc ultimately questions the notion of the latter as something that is spontaneously, creatively designed or "authored" by us as individuals.

==== Chapter II: Harry Black (2011) ====
In the spring of 2011, Slovenc moved in with a complete stranger, an older gentleman – Harry Black. For months he photographed their relationship, creating a catalogue of images that resembled photographs one would find in a family photo album. Slovenc used photography and video to create an illusion of intimacy between two strangers. For the installation in the Bronx Museum, Slovenc recreated Black's living room, replacing all the photographs of Black's loved ones with the images of the constructed intimate relationship.

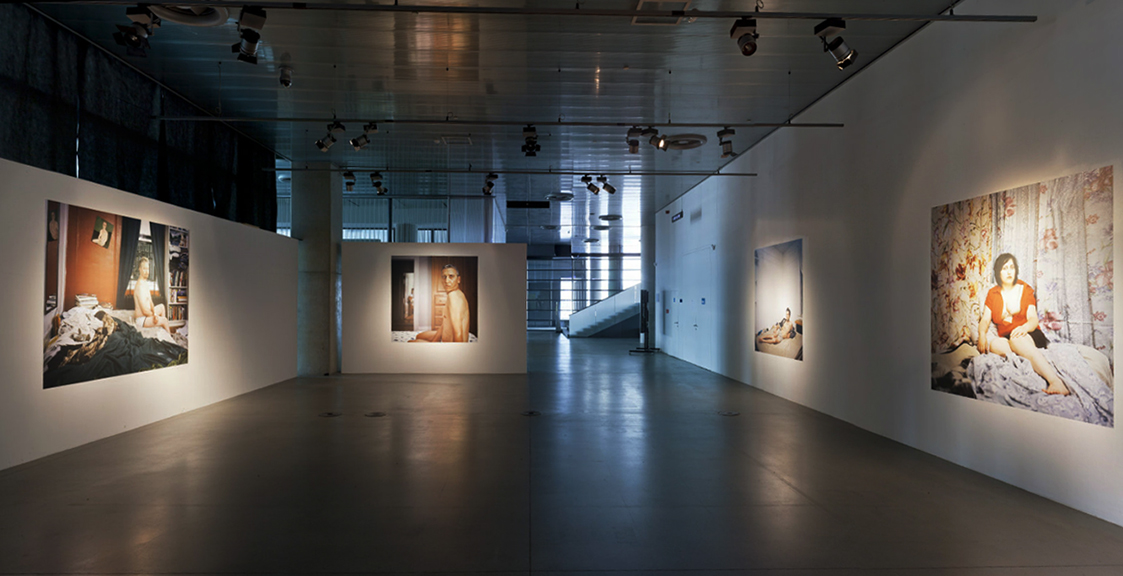
Installation view at the Museum of Contemporary Art. Zagreb, Croatia. March, 2013.

==== Chapter III: Portraits (2012) ====
For this chapter, Slovenc turned his camera toward his family and friends. He placed his subjects in their bedrooms, posed them in classical poses and photographed them. In the resulting images, his models failed to fully realize the roles they should play in the intimacy of their bedroom spaces: they should be relaxed, seductive and intimate, but they were not. Slovenc revealed cracks in identity roles, small signs that indicated that this was a play. These photographs are presented as large-scale photo wallpapers.

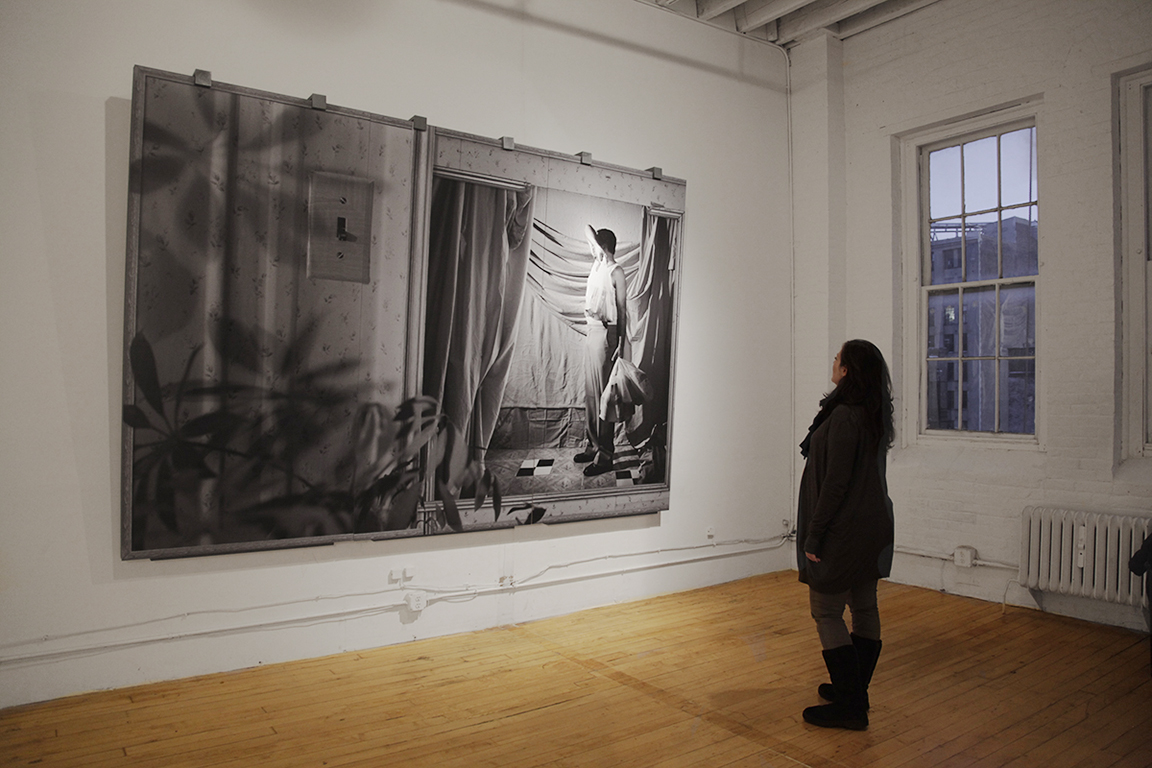
Installation view at Helac Fine Art. New York. March, 2013.

==== Chapter IV: Marble Hill (2013) ====
On the cover of the 1966 book The Photographer's Eye by John Szarkowski is a black and white photograph by an unknown author that shows the interior of an apartment. While working on "Home Theater", Slovenc came across an interior that was a contemporary copy of the mentioned interior. Through a set of unfortunate circumstances, the apartment (which was just a few blocks from Slovenc's apartment in the Marble Hill part of the Bronx, New York) burned down. Slovenc rebuilt the apartment as a scaled-down diorama, lit it on fire and photographed it. All the photographs in this chapter originated, as the author explained, from his own version of "Alice in Wonderland", almost as if the photographs were stills from a post-surreal motion picture. "Moments shown in the photos could occur during the burning of the apartment. Plausible tenants pose for the camera, like in some reality TV show, just moments before they ran out," wrote Leila Topic, a curator from the Museum of Contemporary Art in Zagreb, Croatia. The impression of theatricality of space and surrealism of the scene is enhanced by the author playing with sizes of photographic enlargements, and awkward spatial relationships within the compositions.

=== Breathing in Kabwe (2008) ===
Funded by the Mortimer-Hays Brandeis Traveling Fellowship, Slovenc traveled to Kabwe, Zambia to photograph the effects of lead pollution on the local population. In preparing for the trip, and especially during his stay there, the initial idea evolved to include not only an illustrated essay about people living in an entirely lead-tainted environment but also a deconstruction of the act of photographing the Other. Throughout the months Slovenc lived in Kabwe, he was only too aware of himself, and his own cultural positioning that constituted a very powerful filter through which he viewed things. Rather than privilege either verbal or visual text as the more "authentic," i.e. closer to "reality," Slovenc showed the way in which each type of representation imparts a small, though important, perspective on what he came to decipher as "the real." Ultimately the project has become part travel journal, part interview, part documentary, part autobiography, and part revelation. In short, this project is Slovenc's way of approaching a typical documentary subject matter in such a way that it has become not only about the observed or the observer as individual entities, not about "us" or "them" as two very distinct cultures, but primarily about the relationship between the two.

=== Partners in Crime (2007) ===
Partners in Crime focuses on same-sex couples that have been living together for an extended period of time, eighteen years on average. The idea was inspired by late nineteenth-century wedding portraits and the professional techniques employed in them. While most of the earlier works were produced as cabinet cards, shot in studios with artificial backgrounds, Slovenc's reconstructions are in color, taken in the couples' homes. The purpose is to demonstrate the mundane quality of what can only be seen as a marriage setting. In these photos, the author captures the public face that society mandates for same-sex couples. These couples appear to be both physically and emotionally disconnected because in many ways, both subtle and overt, that is how they are told they should behave. Thus in conflating images of stiff, traditional marriage poses and contemporary domestic spaces, Slovenc has sought to normalize what is still, at best, a hotly contested relationship in American society.

== Public collections ==
- Museum of Contemporary Photography, Chicago, IL.
- Museum of Contemporary Art, Zagreb, Croatia.
- Museum of Arts and Crafts, Zagreb, Croatia.

== Exhibitions ==
- Museum of Contemporary Art, Zagreb, Croatia.
- Helac Fine art, New York, NY
- Garis&Hahn, New York, NY.
- Vienna Fair, Vienna, Austria.
- Young Artists' Biennial, Bucharest, Romania.
- Museum of Modern and Contemporary Art, Rijeka, Croatia.
- Museum of Arts and Crafts, Zagreb, Croatia.
- Atlanta Celebrates Photography, Atlanta, GA.
- The Bronx Museum of the Arts, New York, NY. Biennial 2011.
- Museum of New Art, Detroit, MI. New Media, Sex, and Culture in the 21st Century.
- Michael Mazzeo Gallery, New York, NY. Home Theater.
- Galerija Marisall, Zagreb, Croatia. Novi Likovni Izricaji.
- Eight Veil Gallery, Los Angeles, CA.
- David Weinberg Gallery, Chicago, IL.
- Jason McCoy Gallery, New York, NY.
- Philadelphia Photo Arts Center, Philadelphia, PA. Dream Nation.
- 25CPW, New York, NY. Stranger than Fiction.
- Kitchen Habitat, New York, NY. Objects in the Mirror.
- 2010 Art Chicago, Chicago, IL. New Insight.
- Longwood Art Gallery, New York, NY. Anthem: an all-American dystopia.
- 2009 Pingyao International Photography Festival, Pingyao, China. Breaking Boundaries II.
- Parachute Factory Gallery, New Haven, CT. Family Business.
- Museum of Contemporary Photography, Chicago, IL. Relative Closeness: Portraits of Family and Friends.
- Vollitant Gallery, Austin, TX. Tunnel Vision: Parading Down the Aisle.
- Farmani Gallery, Los Angeles, CA. IPA Best of Show.
- Center for Photographic Art, Carmel, CA. Annual Center Awards Exhibition.
- Northwest Art Center, Minot, ND. Americas.
- Gallery 214, Montclair, NJ. Taboo.
- Go Fish Gallery, New York, NY.
