= Rastislav Veselko =

Slovak ice hockey player

- Born: 29 April 1988 (age 37)
- Position: Defender
- Slovak Extraliga team: HC Slovan Bratislava

Rastislav Veselko (born 29 April 1988) is a Slovak professional ice hockey player who played with HC Slovan Bratislava in the Slovak Extraliga.
