= Vjekoslav =

Male Slavic given name

Vjekoslav, Vekoslav
- Gender: male

Origin
- Origin: Slavic
- Meaning: vijek, vek ("age") + sława/slava ("glory, fame")

Other names
- Variant forms: Vjekoslava (f), Vjeka (f), Vjeko (m), Vjeke (f)

Vjekoslav or Vekoslav is a male Slavic given name, meaning "glorious through the ages".

== People ==
- Vjekoslav Banovic - Croatian Australian football player
- Vjekoslav Bastl - Croatian architect
- Vjekoslav Bevanda - Former prime minister of Bosnia and Herzegovina
- Vjekoslav Lujo Cukela - Croatian American Marine
- Vjekoslav Ćurić - Croatian priest and humanitarian
- Vekoslav Grmič - Slovenian Roman Catholic bishop and theologian
- Vjekoslav Heinzel - Mayor of Zagreb
- Vjekoslav Karas - Croatian painter
- Vjekoslav Klaić - Croatian historian and writer
- Vjekoslav Luburić - Croatian Ustasha World War 2 concentration camp commandant
- Vjekoslav Pasković - Montenegrin water polo player
- Vjekoslav Perica - Croatian historian, journalist and writer
- Vjekoslav Servatzy - Croatian politician and Ustaša general
- Vjekoslav Spinčić - Croatian politician
- Vjekoslav Škrinjar - Croatian footballer
- Vjekoslav Šutej - Croatian orchestral conductor
- Vjekoslav Tomić - Croatian footballer
- Vjekoslav Vrančić - Croatian NDH Undersecretary for the interior minister
- Vjekoslav Vrdoljak - Croatian cinematographer
- Vjekoslav Župančić - Croatian footballer
