= Vatroslav =

Vatroslav is a Croatian masculine given name. It derives from word for "fire" (vatra) and the Slavic language suffix -slav, meaning "glory" or "fame". The feminine version is Vatroslava.

== People named Vatroslav ==
- Vatroslav Brlić (1862–1923), Croatian politician and lawyer
- Vatroslav Jagić (1838–1923), Croatian linguist
- Vatroslav Lichtenegger (1809–1885), Austrian-Croatian music educator
- Vatroslav Lisinski (1819–1854), Croatian composer
- Vatroslav Mihačić (born 1967), retired Croatian footballer
- Vatroslav Mimica (1923–2020), Croatian film director
- Vatroslav Petrinović (born 1959), retired Croatian footballer

== See also ==
- Slavic names
