= Blago =

Blago may refer to:

Given name "Blago" or "Благо"

- Blago Barbieri (1923–1987), a Yugoslav swimmer
- Blago Zadro (1944–1991), a Croatian military commander

Nicknamed "Blago"

- Rod Blagojevich (born 1956), the former Governor of Illinois (2003–2009) impeached and later found guilty on corruption charges in 2010, whose sentence was commuted by President Trump in 2020 and released.

== See also ==
- Primetime Blago, a former talk show segment on the radio program The Roe Conn Show
- The dictionary definition of благо- at Wiktionary
- The dictionary definition of благо at Wiktionary
- The dictionary definition of Благо at Wiktionary
