= Borka (given name) =

Borka is a Slavic female given name. Notable people of this name include the following:

- Borka Grubor (born 1960), Serbian politician
- Borka Jerman Blažič, Slovenian / Yugoslavian academic in information science and internet studies
- Borka Pavićević (1947–2019), Serbian / Yugoslavian dramaturge, newspaper columnist, and cultural activist
- Borka Vučić (1926–2009), Serbian politician
