= Bôrka =

Bôrka Barka
- Municipality
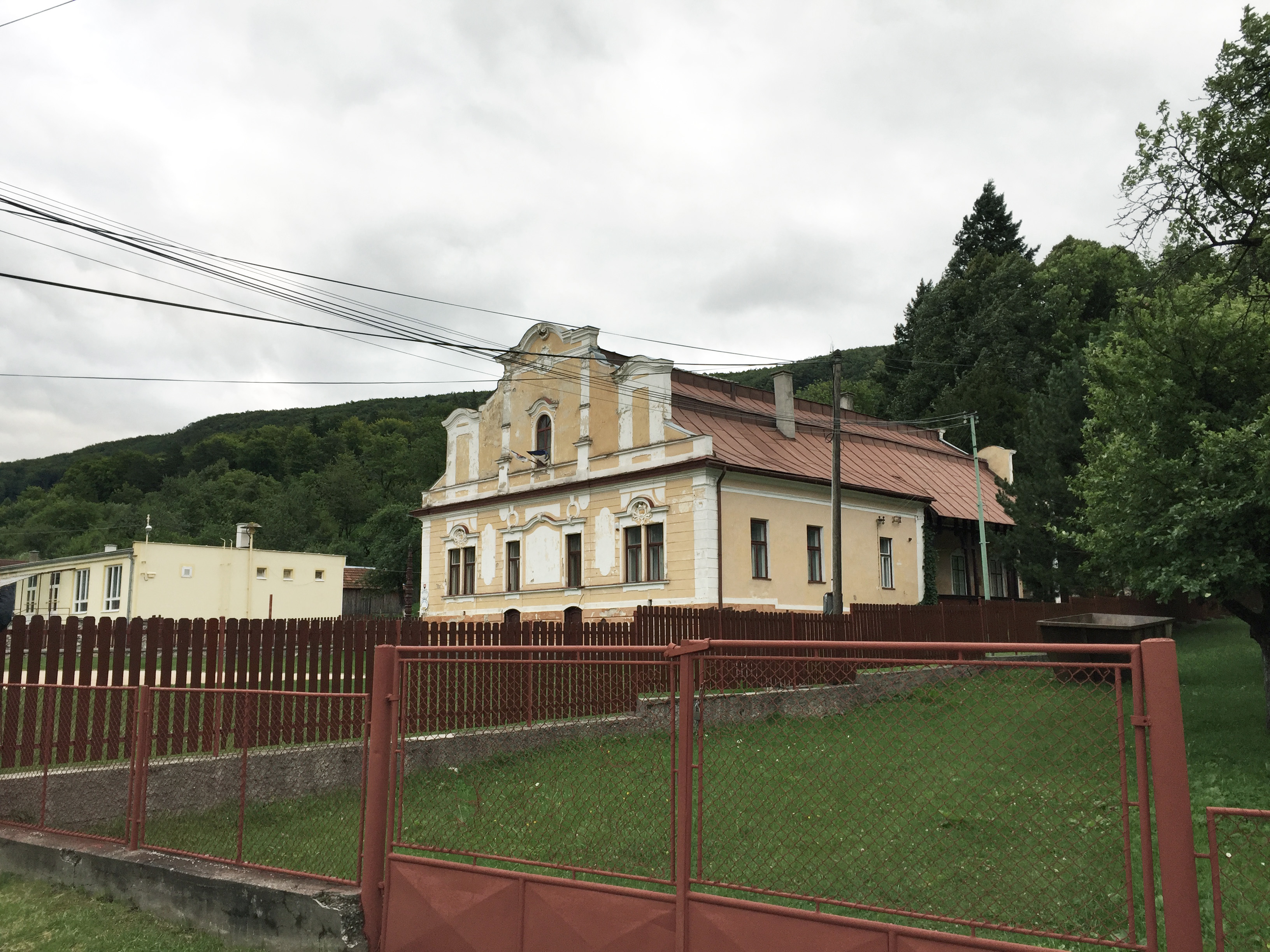

- Flag

- Location of Bôrka in the Košice Region Location of Bôrka in Slovakia
- Coordinates: 48.63°N 20.76°E
- Country: Slovakia
- Region: Košice Region
- District: Rožňava District
- First mentioned: 1409

Area
  - Total: 23.73 km^{2} (9.16 sq mi)
- Elevation: 560 m (1,840 ft)

Population (2025)
  - Total: 678
- Time zone: UTC+1 (CET)
  - Summer (DST): UTC+2 (CEST)
- Postal code: 494 2
- Area code: +421 58
- Vehicle registration plate (until 2022): RV
- Website: www.obecborka.sk

Bôrka (Hungarian: Barka) is a village and municipality in the Rožňava District in the Košice Region of eastern Slovakia.

== Geography ==
The municipality lies at an altitude of 560 metres (1,840 ft) and covers an area of 23.73 km^{2} (9.16 sq mi) (2025).

== History ==
Before the establishment of independent Czechoslovakia in 1918, Bôrka was part of Gömör and Kishont County within the Kingdom of Hungary. From 1938 to 1945, it was again part of Hungary as a result of the First Vienna Award.

== Population ==
Population statistic (10 years)
| Year | 1995 | 2005 | 2015 | 2025 |
|---|---|---|---|---|
| Count | 354 | 470 | 554 | 678 |
| Difference | | +32.76% | +17.87% | +22.38% |

Population statistic
| Year | 2024 | 2025 |
|---|---|---|
| Count | 652 | 678 |
| Difference | | +3.98% |

It has a population of 678 people (31 December 2025).

=== Ethnicity ===
Census 2021 (1+ %)
| Ethnicity | Number | Fraction |
|---|---|---|
| Hungarian | 290 | 47.07% |
| Romani | 168 | 27.27% |
| Slovak | 139 | 22.56% |
| Not found out | 44 | 7.14% |
| Total | 616 | |

In year 2021 was 616 people by ethnicity 290 as Hungarian, 168 as Romani, 139 as Slovak, 44 as Not found out, 2 as Czech and 1 as German.

Note on population: The difference values of population numbers in the table "Population statistic" and in the sections "Ethnicity" & "Religion" is caused by the use of various statistical methods.

=== Religion ===
Census 2021 (1+ %)
| Religion | Number | Fraction |
|---|---|---|
| Roman Catholic Church | 445 | 72.24% |
| Calvinist Church | 63 | 10.23% |
| None | 55 | 8.93% |
| Not found out | 37 | 6.01% |
| Christian Congregations in Slovakia | 8 | 1.3% |
| Total | 616 | |

In year 2021 was 616 people by religion 445 from Roman Catholic Church, 63 from Calvinist Church, 55 from None, 37 from Not found out, 8 from Christian Congregations in Slovakia, 4 from Evangelical Church, 3 from Greek Catholic Church and 1 from Old Catholic Church.

== Genealogical resources ==
The records for genealogical research are available at the state archive "Statny

Archiv in Kosice, Slovakia"

- Roman Catholic church records (births/marriages/deaths): 1748-1895 (parish A)
- Reformated church records (births/marriages/deaths): 1787-1895 (parish A)

== See also ==
- List of municipalities and towns in Slovakia
