= Zvonimir =

- Gender: male

Origin
- Origin: Croatian
- Meaning: zvoni ("ringing, chiming") + mir ("peace, prestige")

Other names
- Related names: Zvonimír (Czech and Slovak); Zvonymyr (Ukrainian); Zwonimierz (Polish); Zvonimieras (Lithuanian)

Zvonimir is a Croatian male given name, used since the Middle Ages.

The name was popular in the former Yugoslavia among the Croatian people because Dmitar Zvonimir was the Croatian king, who ruled from 1075 to 1089.

== People named Zvonimir ==
- Demetrius Zvonimir of Croatia (died 1089), Croatian king
- Zvonimir Berković, Croatian film director, teacher and critic
- Zvonimir Boban, Croatian footballer
- Zvonimir Cimermančić, Croatian footballer
- Ferdinand Zvonimir von Habsburg, Austrian archduke and racing driver
- Zvonimir Janko, Croatian mathematician
- Zvonimir Lončarić, Croatian artist
- Zvonimir Rogoz, Croatian actor
- Zvonimir Serdarušić, Croatian handball player
- Zvonimir Levačić - Ševa, Croatian TV personality from talk show Nightmare Stage
- Zvonimir Soldo, Croatian footballer
- Zvonimir Šeparović, Croatian politician
- Zvonimir Vukić, Serbian footballer
- Zvonimir Srna, Croatian handballer

== See also ==
- Zvonko
- Slavic names
