= Draginja =

Draginja (Serbian: Драгиња) is a feminine given name. Notable people with the name include:

- Draginja Adamović (1925–2000), Serbian poet
- Draginja Babić (1886-1915), Serbian doctor
- Draginja Vlasic (1928–2011), Serbian painter
- Draginja Vuksanović (born 1978), Montenegrin jurist, politician, and professor
