= Dragin =

Dragin (Cyrillic: Драгин) is a Slavic masculine surname, its feminine counterpart is Dragina. The surname may refer to the following notable people:

- Dimitri Dragin (born 1984), French judoka
- Saša Dragin (born 1972), Serbian Minister of Agriculture, Forestry and Water Management
- Sinișa Dragin, Serbian-Romanian film director
