= Dessislava Roussanova =

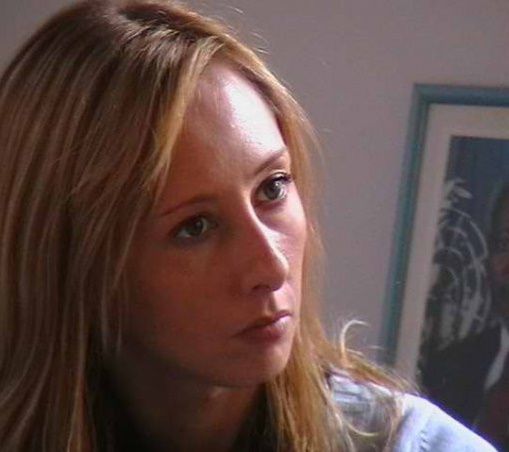
- Roussanova in 2007

Dessislava Roussanova (Cyrillic Десислава Русанова) is a conflict resolution, political negotiations and mediation practitioner. At present she works for Inter-Mediate and the United Nations. Prior to that she worked for International Alert.

Roussanova has worked as a facilitator and advisor on peace processes, peace negotiations and political dialogues in Asia, Latin America, the Middle East and the Gulf, the Balkans and the countries of the Former Soviet Union. Roussanova has also facilitated dialogue initiatives like the National Dialogue of Kyrgyzstan, the "Strasbourg Dialogue" at the Council of Europe (post-August 2008 war between Russia and Georgia), Armenian-Azerbaijani Public Peace Forum. She has worked at the International Secretariat of the global Women Building Peace Campaign and in the Secretariat of the Millennium Peace Prize. For her work she was nominated for Women of the Year Window to the World Award.

Roussanova started her career as a journalist in Bulgaria. She was a reporter and presenter for a prime-time TV programme on the Channel 1 of the Bulgarian National Television She was Head of the Information Department of the Bulgarian Chamber of Commerce and Industry (BCCI) and Senior Expert in the Government Information and Public Relations Service of the office of the Bulgarian Prime Minister and Council of Ministers Government of Bulgaria.
