= Mirjana =

Mirjana (Cyrillic: Мирјана; pronounced [miɾʝänä]) is a South Slavic feminine given name.

The name is widespread throughout Slovenia, Croatia, Bosnia and Herzegovina, Montenegro and Serbia and North Macedonia.

Mirjana is a form of Miryam.

The name is also related to ′mir′ ("peace, world, prestige, area, space").

== List of people with the given name Mirjana ==
- Mirjana Bohanec (born 1939), Croatian opera singer and actress
- Mirjana Boševska (born 1981), retired female freestyle and medley swimmer from Macedonia
- Mirjana Božović (born 1987), beauty queen who represented Serbia in Miss World 2007
- Mirjana Đurica (born 1961), former Yugoslav/Serbian handball player
- Mirjana Gross (1922–2012), Croatian historian
- Mirjana Isaković (born 1936), Serbian sculptor
- Mirjana Joković (born 1967), Serbian actress
- Mirjana Karanović (born 1957), Serbian actress
- Mirjana Kostić (born 1983), Serbian singer
- Mirjana Lučić (born 1982), professional tennis player from Croatia
- Mirjana Marić (born 1970), American-born Serbian chess player
- Mirjana Marković (1942–2019), Serbian politician, widow of former Yugoslav president Slobodan Milošević
- Mirjana Milenković (born 1985), Montenegrin handball player
- Mirjana Ognjenović (born 1953), former Yugoslav/Croatian handball player
- Mirjana Puhar (1995–2015), America's Next Top Model contestant
- Ana Mirjana Račanović, Serbian pageant model who was Miss Bosnia and Herzegovina in 2001
- Mirjana Vukićević-Karabin (1933–2020), Serbian astrophysicist
- Mirjana Živković (1935–2020), Serbian musicologist and professor
