= Srećko =

Srećko (Serbian: Срећко) or Srečko is a South Slavic masculine given name. It is a Slavic form of Felix. The name may refer to:

- Srećko Bogdan, Croatian footballer
- Srečko Brodar, Slovenian archaeologist
- Srećko Horvat, Croatian philosopher, author and political activist
- Srećko Ilić, Yugoslav footballer
- Srećko Juričić, Croatian professional footballer
- Srečko Katanec, Slovenian professional football manager and former player
- Srečko Kosovel, Slovenian poet
- Srećko Lisinac, Serbian volleyball player
- Srećko Mitrović, Bosnian soccer player
- Srećko Pejović, Serbian sport shooter
- Srećko Puntarić, Croatian cartoonist
- Srećko Štiglić, Croatian Olympic athlete

== See also ==
- Srećković
