= Prvoslav =

Prvoslav (Serbian Cyrillic: Првослав) is a Serbian masculine given name first attested in the Middle Ages. It derives from prvo ("first") and slava ("glory, fame") and is thus commonly given to the firstborn child.

== People ==
- Prvoslav Radojević, Serbian nobleman
- Prvoslav Dragićević, Serbian footballer
- Prvoslav Mihajlović, Serbian footballer
- Prvoslav Davinić, Serbian politician of the Council of Ministers of Serbia and Montenegro
- Prvoslav Ilić, Serbian wrestler who competed in the 1980 Summer Olympics
- Prvoslav Vujcic, Serbian writer

== Other ==
- The birth name of Serbian Patriarch Porfirije is Prvoslav
- The birth name of Patrick Jovanovic is Prvoslav

== See also ==
- Pribislav of Serbia
