= Mislav =

Mislav (pronounced [mîslaʋ]) is a South Slavic masculine given name found in Croatia.

Notable people with the name include:

- Mislav, Duke of Croatia (fl. 9th century), medieval duke of the Croats
- Mislav Anđelković (born 1988), Croatian football player
- Mislav Bago (1973–2022), Croatian journalist and broadcaster
- Mislav Bezmalinović (1967–2024), Yugoslav and Croatian water polo player
- Mislav Grgić (born 1973), Croatian scientist and engineer
- Mislav Ježić (born 1952), Croatian philosopher and Indologist
- Mislav Karoglan (born 1982), Bosnian and Croatian football manager and player
- Mislav Kolakušić (born 1969), Croatian lawyer and politician
- Mislav Komorski (born 1992), Croatian football player
- Mislav Oršić (born 1992), Croatian football player
- Mislav Rosandić (born 1995), Croatian-born Slovak ice hockey player
- Mislav Sever (born 1994), Croatian swimmer
