= Borka, Kamrup =

Borka
- Village
- Location in Assam, India Borka (India)
- Coordinates: 26.29°N 91.67°E
- Country: India
- State: Assam
- Region: Western Assam
- District: Kamrup

Government
  - Body: Athgaon Gram panchayat

Languages
  - Official: Assamese
- Time zone: UTC+5:30 (IST)
- PIN: 781101
- Vehicle registration: AS
- Website: kamrup.nic.in

Borka, also known as Borka Satgaon, is a large village in Kamalpur tehsil, Kamrup Rural district, Assam, India. It is situated near Changsari and is a 30 km distance from Guwahati. The village is a distance of 5 km from AIIMS Guwahati.

== Education ==
Schools and colleges include:

- Sankardev Shishu Niketan School
- Madhya Kampith College
- Borka Satgoan High School
- Borka High School
- Moonlight Academy
- Sammanay Academy
- Devarshi Vidyapeeth
- Pub Kamrup College
- Sonapur College, Kamrup
