= Ratka =

Ratka Rátkapuszta
- Municipality
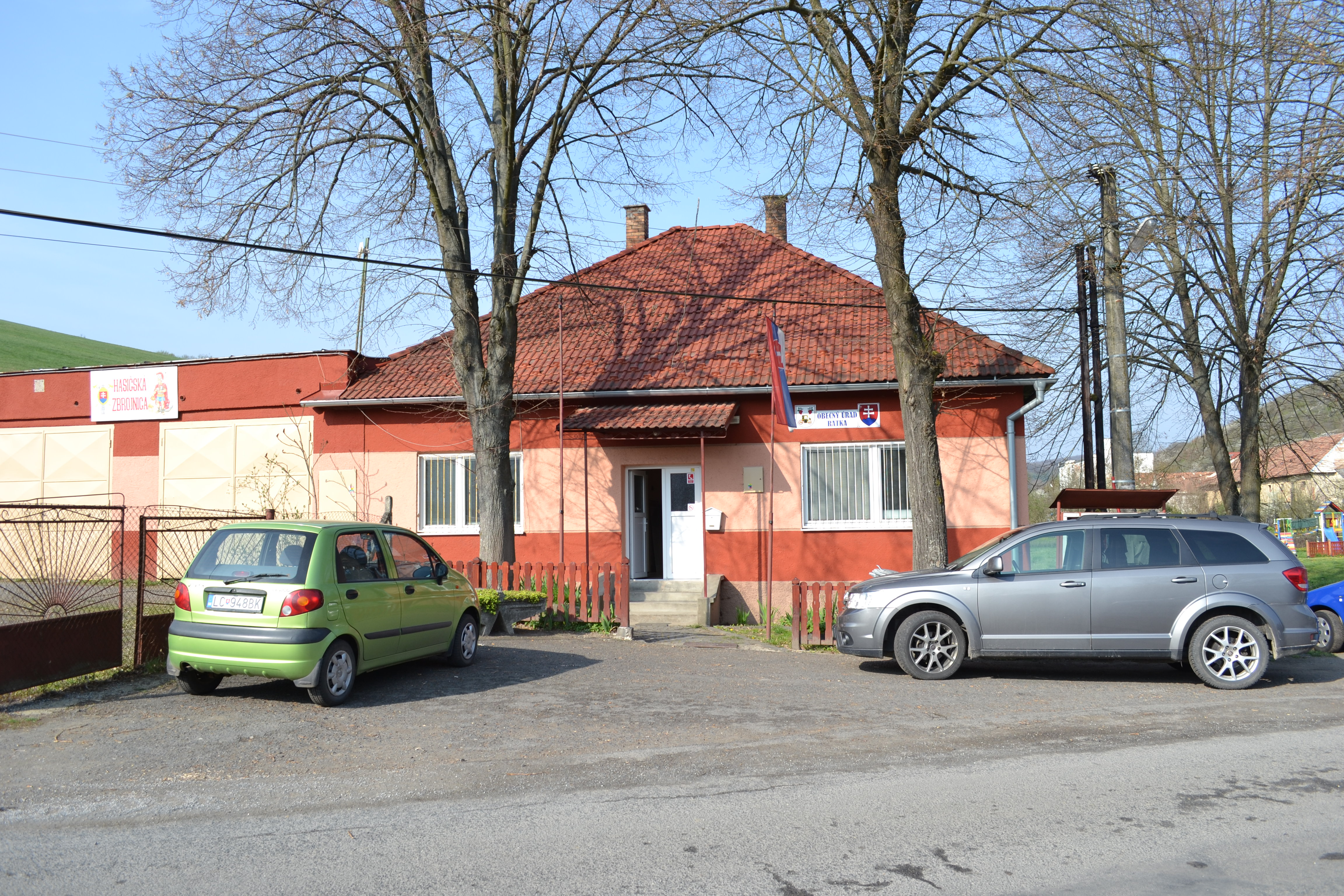

- Flag

- Location of Ratka in the Banská Bystrica Region Location of Ratka in Slovakia
- Coordinates: 48.25°N 19.79°E
- Country: Slovakia
- Region: Banská Bystrica Region
- District: Lučenec District
- First mentioned: 1955

Area
  - Total: 12.60 km^{2} (4.86 sq mi)
- Elevation: 222 m (728 ft)

Population (2025)
  - Total: 342
- Time zone: UTC+1 (CET)
  - Summer (DST): UTC+2 (CEST)
- Postal code: 986 01
- Area code: +421 47
- Vehicle registration plate (until 2022): LC
- Website: www.obecratka.sk

Ratka (Hungarian: Rátkapuszta) is a village and municipality in the Lučenec District in the Banská Bystrica Region of Slovakia.

== Geography ==
The municipality lies at an altitude of 222 metres (728 ft) and covers an area of 12.60 km^{2} (4.86 sq mi) (2025).

== Population ==
Population statistic (10 years)
| Year | 1995 | 2005 | 2015 | 2025 |
|---|---|---|---|---|
| Count | 335 | 321 | 307 | 342 |
| Difference | | −4.17% | −4.36% | +11.40% |

Population statistic
| Year | 2024 | 2025 |
|---|---|---|
| Count | 347 | 342 |
| Difference | | −1.44% |

It has a population of 342 people (31 December 2025).

=== Ethnicity ===
Census 2021 (1+ %)
| Ethnicity | Number | Fraction |
|---|---|---|
| Slovak | 288 | 87.53% |
| Hungarian | 20 | 6.07% |
| Not found out | 14 | 4.25% |
| Turkish | 12 | 3.64% |
| Albanian | 4 | 1.21% |
| Total | 329 | |

In year 2021 was 329 people by ethnicity 288 as Slovak, 20 as Hungarian, 14 as Not found out, 12 as Turkish, 4 as Albanian, 1 as Czech and 1 as Polish.

Note on population: The difference values of population numbers in the table "Population statistic" and in the sections "Ethnicity" & "Religion" is caused by the use of various statistical methods.

=== Religion ===
Census 2021 (1+ %)
| Religion | Number | Fraction |
|---|---|---|
| Roman Catholic Church | 224 | 68.09% |
| None | 55 | 16.72% |
| Islam | 15 | 4.56% |
| Evangelical Church | 13 | 3.95% |
| Not found out | 11 | 3.34% |
| Greek Catholic Church | 7 | 2.13% |
| Total | 329 | |

In year 2021 was 329 people by religion 224 from Roman Catholic Church, 55 from None, 15 from Islam, 13 from Evangelical Church, 11 from Not found out, 7 from Greek Catholic Church, 1 from Old Catholic Church, 1 from Eastern Orthodox Church, 1 from Paganism and natural spirituality and 1 from Buddhism.
