= Divna M. Vuksanović =

Serbian philosopher & writer (born 1965)

- Дивна М. Вуксановић
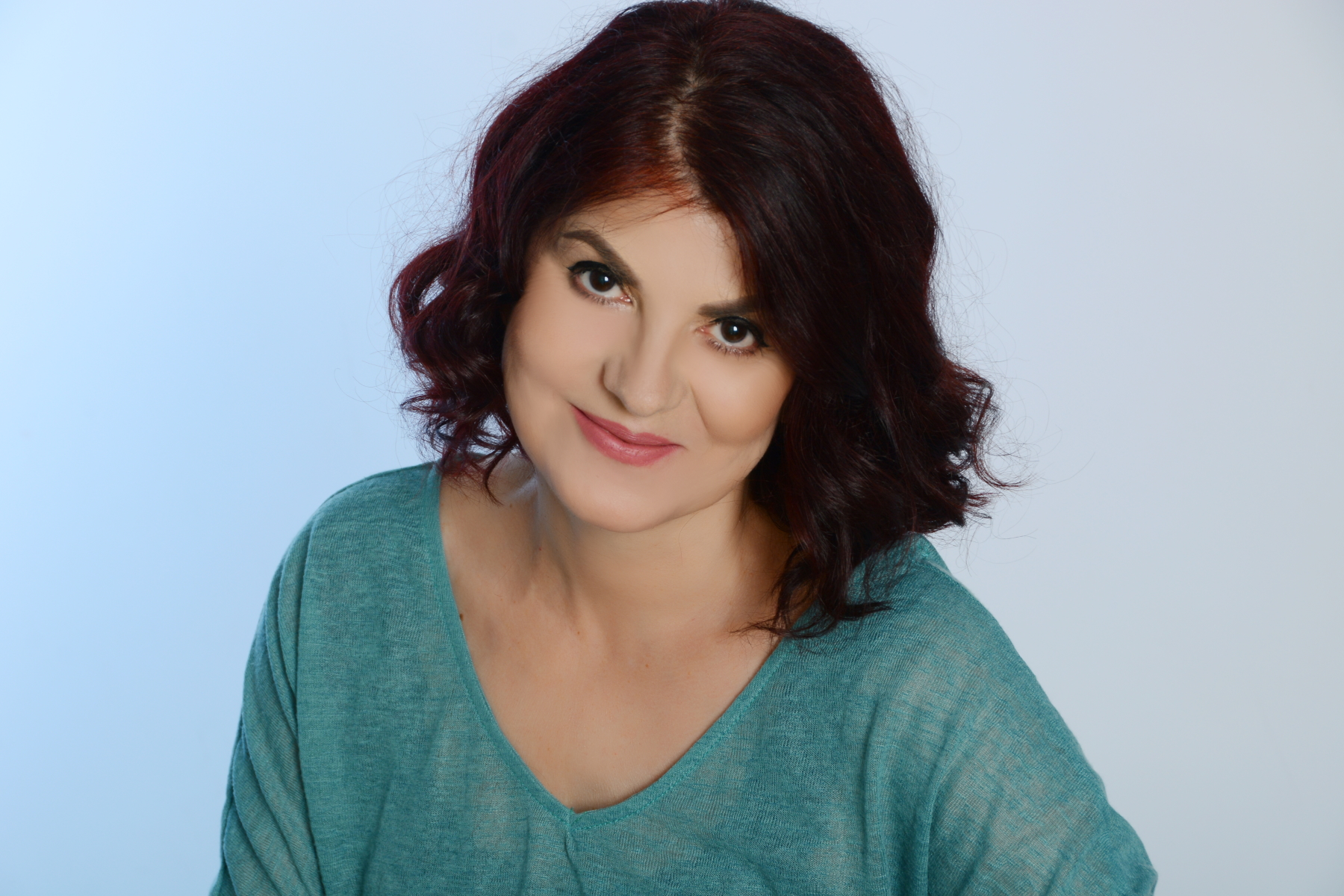
- Born: March 17, 1965; Belgrade, Serbia
- Occupations: philosopher, writer
- Writing career
- Language: Serbian

Divna M. Vuksanović (Serbian Cyrillic: Дивна М. Вуксановић; 17 March 1965) is a Serbian philosopher, writer, media theorist and the president of the Aesthetic Society of Serbia.

== Biography ==
She graduated from the Department of Performing and Organizing Cultural and Artistic Activities of the Faculty of Dramatic Arts in 1988 and the Department of Philosophy, University of Belgrade in 1992. She holds a MA in theater studies (1993) and a Doctor of Philosophy of Science in the field of contemporary philosophy and aesthetics (1998).

== Work ==
Vuksanović started her literary work with the book of poetry Madona dugog vrata (1992). Her later work included books of short stories, poetic prose and novels: Opažač, opažena (1997), Glava harfe (with Dragan Jovanović Danilov, 1998), Život sa Trolovima (1998), Patološke priče (1999), Avanture sa stvarima (2003).

She was an editor for literary journals ProFemina, Knjževna reč and Lipar.

She has published four scientific studies: Baroque spirit in modern philosophy: Benjamin, Adorno, Bloch, 2001 Aesthetica Minima, 2004 Philosophy Media: Ontology, aesthetics, criticism (first edition - 2007 Second Edition - 2008) Philosophy media 2 : Ontology, aesthetics, criticism (2011).

She edited the book: The media for the book - book for the media, 2008. Three thematic collections of the Aesthetic Society of Serbia: The aesthetics and art criticism, 2004. What is aesthetics? (With Nebojša Grubor, 2006) Art culture (with Nebojša Grubor, 2007) Thematic Issue Culture: Cultural Identities cities, 2009. Culture rhythms and spectacle, 2010. The philosophy of the media, 2012. Reviews

== Selected works ==
- Postmoderna i fenomen sinkretizacije žanrova u jugoslovenskom pozorištu do 1991. godine, magistarski rad iz teatrologije, 1993.
- Barokni duh u savremenoj filozofiji: Benjamin, Adorno, Bloh, doktorska disertacija, Čigoja, Beograd. 2001. ISBN 86-80269-47-6.
- Aesthetica Minima, Zograf, Niš. 2004. ISBN 86-7578-091-5.
- Filozofija medija: ontologija, estetika, kritika, monografija, 1. tom, Čigoja, Beograd. 2007. ISBN 978-86-82101-30-7.
- Filozofija medija: ontologija, estetika, kritika, 2. tom, Fakultet dramskih umetnosti, Institut za pozorište, film, radio i televiziju, Čigoja, Beograd. 2011. ISBN 978-86-82101-41-3
