= Vedran Kukoč =

Croatian footballer

Personal information
- Full name: Vedran Kukoč
- Date of birth: 26 January 1976 (age 50)
- Place of birth: Split, SR Croatia, SFR Yugoslavia
- Position: Defender

Senior career*
Years	Team	Apps	(Gls)
1992–1993	RNK Split		
1994–1996	Primorac Stobreč		
1999	Posušje	6	(0)
2000–2001	Osijek	5	(1)
2001–2002	Šibenik	14	(0)
2003–2005	Solin	40	(5)
2005–2007	Perak		
2008	Primorac Stobreč	6	(0)
2009	Jadran Kaštel Sućurac	2	(0)
- * Club domestic league appearances and goals as of 10 December 2006

Vedran Kukoč (born 26 January 1976, in Split) is a Croatian retired football player. He played abroad for Malaysian Super League side Perak. His preferred position was central defence.

== Club career ==
Kukoč previously played for NK Osijek and HNK Šibenik in the Croatian Prva HNL.

Upon his signing for Perak, coach Steve Darby described Kukoč as "a solid player who is good in the air, very intelligent and very experienced". His assured performances confirmed Kukoč's status as a fan favourite. While at Perak, he was affectionately nicknamed Cookie by their fans.

Kukoc requested, and was subsequently granted, a release at the end of the 2007 season as he wanted to get married.
