= Borka Grubor =

Serbian politician

Borka Grubor (Serbian Cyrillic: Борка Грубор; born 1960) is a politician in Serbia. She has served in the National Assembly of Serbia since 2016 as a member of the Serbian Progressive Party.

== Early life and career ==
Grubor is a medical doctor. Prior to her election to the National Assembly, she served as deputy leader of the Progressive Party group in the Loznica municipal assembly.

== Parliamentarian ==
Grubor received the 102nd position on the Progressive Party's Aleksandar Vučić – Serbia Is Winning electoral list in the 2016 Serbian parliamentary election and was elected when the list won a majority with 131 out of 250 mandates. She is currently a member of the parliamentary environmental protection committee; a deputy member of the committee on human and minority rights, and gender equality and the health and family committee; and a member of the parliamentary friendship groups with Australia, Austria, Azerbaijan, Belarus, China, Georgia, Germany, Japan, Kazakhstan, Russia, Slovenia, Sweden, and Switzerland.
