= Blaga (name) =

Blaga is both a surname and a given name. Notable people with the name include:

- Iosif Blaga (1864–1937), Romanian literary theorist, educator and politician
- Lucian Blaga (1895–1961), Romanian poet, playwright and philosopher
- Vasile Blaga (born 1956), Romanian politician
- Blaga Dimitrova (1922–2003), Bulgarian poet
