= Domagoj =

- Gender: male
- Language: Croatian

Origin
- Origin: Slavic
- Meaning: dom ("home") + goj ("grow, breed, foster, nurture")
- Region of origin: Croatia, Bosnia and Herzegovina

Domagoj is a Croatian name of Slavic origin derived from the Slavic elements dom ("home") and goj ("grow, breed, foster, nurture"). Notable people with the name include:

- Domagoj of Croatia, a duke (knez) of Dalmatian Croatia in 864–876
- Domagoj Abramović, Croatian footballer
- Domagoj Antolić, Croatian footballer
- Domagoj Bošnjak, Croatian basketball player
- Domagoj Bradarić, Croatian footballer
- Domagoj Duvnjak, Croatian handball player
- Domagoj Franić (born 1993), Croatian footballer
- Domagoj Kapec, Croatian ice hockey player
- Domagoj Kapetanović, Croatian footballer and manager
- Domagoj Pavičić, Croatian footballer
- Domagoj Pušić, Croatian footballer
- Domagoj Vida, Croatian footballer

== See also ==
- House of Domagojević
