= Davor (name) =

Davor is an old Slavic given name possibly derived from an old exclamation expressing joy or sorrow. Feminine variant: Davorka. The name may refer to:

- Davor Antunović (born 1979), popular German author and psychotherapist
- Davor Badrov (born 1992), Bosnian singer
- Davorka Balić (born 1988), Croatian basketball player
- Davor Bernardić (born 1980), Croatian politician
- Davor Božinović (born 1961), Croatian diplomat and politician
- Davor Čop (born 1958), Croatian and Yugoslav footballer
- Davor Dominiković (born 1978), Croatian handball player
- Davor Dujmović (1969–1999), Bosnian Serb actor
- Davor Džalto (born 1980), artist and art historian
- Davor Gobac (born 1964), Croatian rock singer
- Davor Jozić (born 1960), Croatian and Yugoslav footballer
- Davor Kus (born 1978), Croatian basketball player
- Davor Lopar (born 1998), Serbian basketball player
- Davor Marcelić (born 1969), Croatian basketball player
- Davor Pejčinović (born 1971), Croatian basketball player
- Davor Solter (born 1941), Yugoslavian-born developmental biologist
- Davor Štefanek (born 1985), Serbian Olympic Wrestling Champion
- Davor Ivo Stier (born 1972), Croatian politician
- Davor Šuker (born 1968), Croatian footballer, 1998 FIFA World Cup Golden Boot winner
- Davor Vugrinec (born 1975), Croatian footballer
