= Mila (given name) =

- Gender: Female

Origin
- Origin: Slavic, Hebrew, Spanish, Arabic, Persian, Amazigh
- Meaning: gracious, dear

Other names
- Related names: Ludmiła, Milada, Milady, Milena, Milica, Milagros

Mila (Cyrillic: Мила, Polish: Miła) is a feminine Slavic name originating from Central or Eastern Europe. It is a diminutive of Slavic names beginning or ending with Mila which derived from the element Mil (Мил) meaning "gracious" or "dear". It is also used among the Spanish as a short-hand for Milagros, meaning "miracles".

In the Arabic language, the word Mila is derived from Mayla ميلاء (meaning a large tree with slanting branches).

In the Turkish, Mila is the shortened version of the Turkish name Almila/Almıla.

While in Berber languages Mila comes from Milo which means Shadow, it is estimated to be the toponymy of Algerian Province Mila.

Mila is also an unconventional gender neutral Tibetan name, likely a derivative of the Tibetan yogi Milarepa.

== Notable people ==
- Mila D. Aguilar (1949–2023), Filipina poet
- Milla Grosberghaugen Andreassen (born 2005), Norwegian cross-country skier
- Mila Gojsalić (died 1530), Croatian folk heroine
- Mila Guy (born 1992), South African actress and costume designer
- Mila Haugová (born 1942), Slovak poet
- Mila Hermanovski (born 1969), American costume designer and fashion designer
- Mila Holloway (born 2006), American basketball player
- Mila Horvat (born 1981), Croatian television host
- Mila Iskrenova (born 1960), Bulgarian modern dance choreographer, dancer and painter
- Mila Jasey (born 1951), American politician
- Mila Kajas (born 1972), Finnish competitive figure skater
- Mila Adjukak Kamingoak, Canadian politician
- Mila Kopp (1904–1973), Austrian actress
- Mila Kunis (born 1983), Soviet-born American actress
- Mila Manes, Argentine singer and songwriter
- Mila Mason (born 1963), American country music artist
- Mila Marinova (born 1974), Bulgarian rhythmic gymnast
- Mila Tupper Maynard (1864–1926), American Unitarian minister, writer, and suffragist
- Mila Mulroney (born 1953), Serbian-Canadian campaigner
- Mila Nikolova (1962–2018), Bulgarian mathematician
- Mila Pavićević (born 1988), Croatian writer
- Mila Racine (1921–1945), French Jewish underground resistance member
- Mila Robert (born 1996), Bulgarian singer, songwriter, painter and actress
- Mila Savić (born 1974), Serbian sprinter
- Mila Schön (1916–2008), Dalmatian Italian fashion designer
- Mila del Sol (1923–2020), Filipina actress, entrepreneur and philanthropist
- Mila Syvatska (born 1998), Ukrainian actress
- Mila, in the Mila affair, subjected to online abuse after criticising Islam

== Fictional characters ==
- Mila (Dead or Alive), in the video game Dead or Alive 5
- Mila (Star Trek), in the TV series Star Trek: Deep Space Nine
- Mila Marwa, from the British soap opera EastEnders
- Mila, the goddess of Valentia and the sister of Duma in the video game Fire Emblem Gaiden
- Mila, in the video game Hotel Dusk: Room 215
- Mila, in the German release of the Japanese anime Attack No. 1 (retitled Mila Superstar)
- Mila, in the children's book The Music of Dolphins by Karen Hesse
- Mila Babicheva, in the anime Yuri on Ice
- Mila, in the Serbian animated series Lola and Mila

== See also ==
- Milla (disambiguation)
- Ludmila (given name)
- Milada (name)
- Milena (name)
- Milagros
- Mile (given name)
- Milica
