= Ludmila (given name) =

Ludmil(l)a
- Gender: female
- Language: Slavic

Origin
- Origin: Slavic
- Meaning: ljudъ ("people") + *milъ ("dear")
- Region of origin: Eastern Europe

Other names
- Alternative spelling: Людмила
- Variant forms: Ludomil (m), Ludomił (m)
- Nicknames: Russian: Люда (Luda), Люся (Lusya), Мила (Mila), Љума (Ljuma), Czech: Lida

Ludmila or Ludmilla is a female given name of Slavic origin. It consists of two elements: lud ("people") and mila ("dear, love"). Because the initial L is mostly soft (palatalized), it is sometimes also transcribed Lyudmila, Lyudmyla or Ljudmila, and is written as Ľudmila or Ľudmyla in Slovak.

Other variants include: Людмила, (Bulgarian, Russian and Ukrainian), Людміла (Belarusian), Људмила (Macedonian and Serbian), Ludomiła, Ludmiła, Ludzimiła, Ludźmiła (Polish), and Ludmilla (Hungarian).

Nicknames in Russian are: Люда (Lyuda), Люся (Lyusya), Мила (Mila)

The most notable bearer is Ludmila of Bohemia, a 10th-century princess and the grandmother of Wenceslaus I, Duke of Bohemia. The feast day for the saint is September 16, which is celebrated as a name day in Hungary, Poland, the Czech Republic, and Slovakia. Other name days include September 17 (Hungary), and February 20, May 7, July 30, and October 26 (Poland).

People with the given name Ludmila or variants include:

== Medieval and early modern eras ==
In chronological order

- Ludmila of Bohemia (c. 860–921), Czech Orthodox and Roman Catholic saint and martyr
- Ludmila (wife of Mieszko I Tanglefoot) (died after 1210), High Duchess of Poland
- Ludmilla of Bohemia (died 1240), Duchess consort of Bavaria
- Ludmilla Elisabeth of Schwarzburg-Rudolstadt (1640–1672), Countess of Schwarzburg-Rudolstadt and hymn poet

== Late modern era ==
In alphabetical order

- Ludmilla (singer) (born Ludmila Oliveira da Silva, 1995), Brazilian singer
- Lyudmila Andonova (born 1960), Bulgarian high jumper
- Lyudmila Arkhipova (born 1978), Russian race walker
- Ludmila Armata (born 1954), Polish-born Canadian painter
- Ludmilla Assing (1821–1880), German writer
- Ludmila Belousova (1935–2017), Russian figure skater
- Lyudmyla Blonska (born 1977), Ukrainian heptathlete
- Lyudmila Butuzova (born 1957), Soviet high jumper
- Lyudmila Byakova (born 1946), Russian seamstress
- Ľudmyla Cervanová (born 1979), Slovak tennis player
- Lyudmila Chernykh (1935–2017), Soviet astronomer
- Ludmilla Chiriaeff (1924–1996), Soviet-born Canadian ballet dancer, choreographer, teacher and company director
- Lyudmila Davletova (born 1940), Soviet and Kazakh engineer, technologist and stateswoman
- Lyudmyla Denisova (born 1960), Ukrainian politician and former Minister of Labor and Social Policy
- Ludmila Engquist (born 1964), Swedish hurdler
- Ludmila Ezhova (born 1982), Russian gymnast
- Ludmila Ferber (1965–2022), Brazilian singer
- Ludmila Formanová (born 1974), Czech middle distance runner
- Lyudmila Gurchenko (1935–2011), Russian film actress
- Liudmyla Horova (born 1975), Ukrainian poet and writer
- Lyudmila Ivanova (1933–2016), Soviet and Russian film and stage actress
- Ludmila Javorová (1932–2026), Czech vicar general
- Lyudmila Karachkina (born 1948), Soviet astronomer
- Lyudmyla Kichenok (born 1992), Ukrainian tennis player
- Lyudmila Kolchanova (born 1979), Russian long jumper
- Lyudmila Kondratyeva (born 1958), Russian athlete
- Ludmilla Kunzmann (1774–1843), Czech industrialist
- Lyudmyla Lyatetska (1941–2020), Ukrainian paediatrician
- Ludmila Manicler (born 1987), Argentine footballer
- Ľudmyla Melicherová (born 1964), Slovak long-distance runner
- Ludmila Mikaël (born 1947), French actress
- Lyudmyla Milyayeva (1925–2022), Ukrainian art historian and university teacher
- Ludmila Pagliero (born 1983), Argentinian ballet dancer
- Ľudmyla Pajdušáková (1916–1979), Slovak astronomer
- Ludmilla Pajo (1947–1995), Albanian journalist and author
- Lyudmila Pavlichenko (1916–1974), Ukrainian Soviet sniper during World War II
- Lyudmila Petrova (born 1968), Russian long-distance runner
- Ludmila Polesná (1934–1988), Czechoslovak world champion slalom canoeist
- Lyudmila Poradnyk (born 1946), Soviet Ukrainian handball player
- Liudmila Privivkova (born 1986), Russian curler
- Ludmila Prokunina-Olsson (born 1967), Russian medical geneticist
- Lyudmyla Pushkina (born 1965), Ukrainian long-distance runner
- Lyudmila Putina (born 1958), former wife of Vladimir Putin
- Lyudmila Radkova-Traykova (born 1968), Bulgarian folk singer
- Lyudmila Rudenko (1904–1986), Soviet chess player and second women's world chess champion
- Liudmila Samsonova (born 1998), Russian tennis player
- Ludmila da Silva (born 1994), Brazilian footballer
- Ludmila Semenyaka (born 1952), Russian ballerina
- Lyudmila Shevtsova (born 1934), Russian athlete
- Lyudmila Stanukinas (1930–2020), Soviet documentary filmmaker
- Ludmilla Tchérina (1924–2004), French prima ballerina, sculptor, actress, painter, choreographer and novelist
- Liudmila Terentʹeva (1910–1982), Soviet ethnographer
- Ludmilla Tourischeva (born 1952), Russian Olympic and world champion gymnast
- Ludmila Tukan (born 1982), Moldovan singer
- Ludmila Vachtová (1933–2020), Czech art historian and critic
- Lyudmila Verbitskaya (1936–2019), Russian linguist and teacher; president of Saint Petersburg State University
- Lyudmila Veselkova (born 1950), Soviet middle distance runner
- Lyudmila Zhivkova (1942–1981), Bulgarian politician
- Lyudmila Zhuravleva (born 1946), Soviet astronomer
- Lyudmila Zykina (1929–2009), Russian singer

== Fictional characters ==
- a title character of Ruslan and Ludmila, a poem by Alexandr Pushkin
- a title character of Ruslan and Lyudmila (opera), by Mikhail Glinka
- the title character of Ludmila's Broken English, a 2006 book by D.B.C. Pierre
- the title character of Saint Ludmila (oratorio), by Antonín Dvořák
- Ludmilla, the main antagonist of the film Bartok the Magnificent
- Ludmila Ferro, main antagonist of the Disney Channel Latin America series Violetta
- Lyudmila "Crownslayer" Ilinichna, a boss and playable character in the mobile strategy gacha game Arknights
- Ludmilla Vipiteno, the "Other Reader" in the novel If on a winter's night a traveler, by Italo Calvino
