= Milada =

Milada may refer to:

- Milada (name), a feminine given name
- Milada (fly), a genus of fly of the family Tachinidae
- Milada (film), a 2017 Czech biographical film
- Lake Milada, a lake in the Ústí nad Labem Region of the Czech Republic
- Squat Milada a social centre (evicted) in Prague
