= 1942 Dominican Republic general election =

Election in the Dominican Republic

- 16 May 1942
- Presidential election
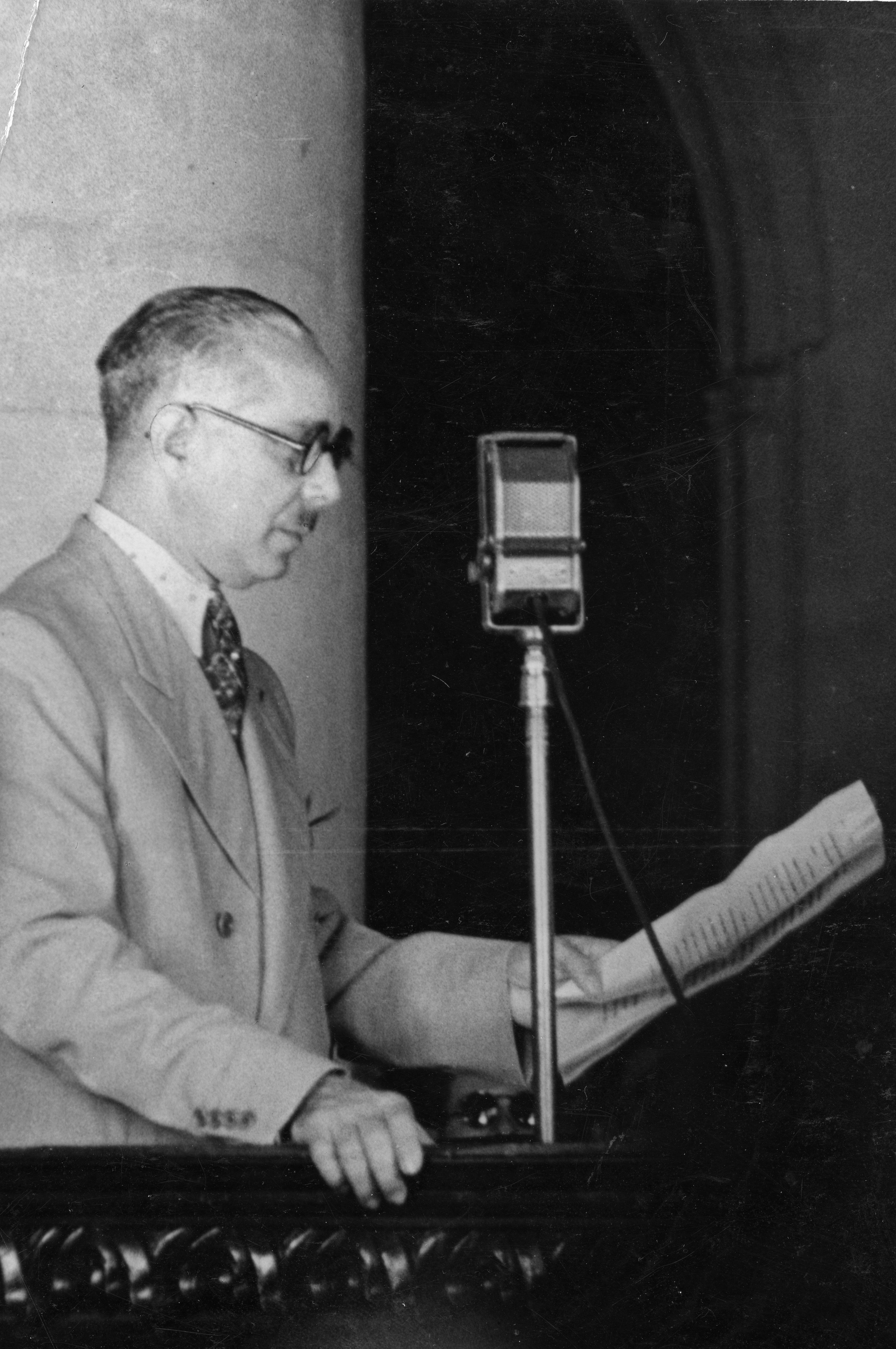
Nominee	Rafael Trujillo
Party	Dominican Party
Popular vote	581,937
Percentage	100%
President before election
Manuel de Jesús Troncoso de la Concha
Dominican Party
Elected President
Rafael Trujillo
Dominican Party

General elections were held in the Dominican Republic on 16 May 1942. Rafael Trujillo, who had previously served as president from 1930 to 1938, was the sole presidential candidate and was returned to office unopposed. He had remained the country's de facto leader even after leaving office for the first time. His Dominican Party won every seat in the Congressional elections.

They were the first elections in Dominican history in which women could vote, and three women were elected; Isabel Mayer to the Senate and Milady Félix de L'Official and Josefa Sánchez de González to the Chamber of Deputies.

== Results ==
Party	Candidate	Votes	%	Seats	
Party	Candidate	Votes	%	House	Senate
Dominican Party	Rafael Trujillo	581,937	100.00	35	16
Total		581,937	100.00	35	16
Source: Nohlen
