= Alazne =

Basque feminine name

- Pronunciation: ah-LAZ-nay
- Gender: Female

Origin
- Origin: Basque
- Region of origin: Basque country, Spain

Other names
- Related names: Milagros

Alazne is a Basque feminine given name, meaning "mirror". The name was proposed by Sabino Arana in his 1910 list of Basque saints names as an equivalent to Milagros. The name day is on July 21. In the United States, it was ranked #6005 by popularity in 2020.

Notable people with the name include:

- Alazne Ameztoy, Spanish composer
- Alazne Etxebarria, Spanish actress
- Alazne Furundarena, Spanish sprinter
- Alazne Gómez, Basque footballer
- Alazne Urizar, Venezuelan golfist
- Alazne Ortega, Altered Carbon (TV series) fictional character
