= DR Class 130 family =

Class of East German diesel locomotives

DR Class 132
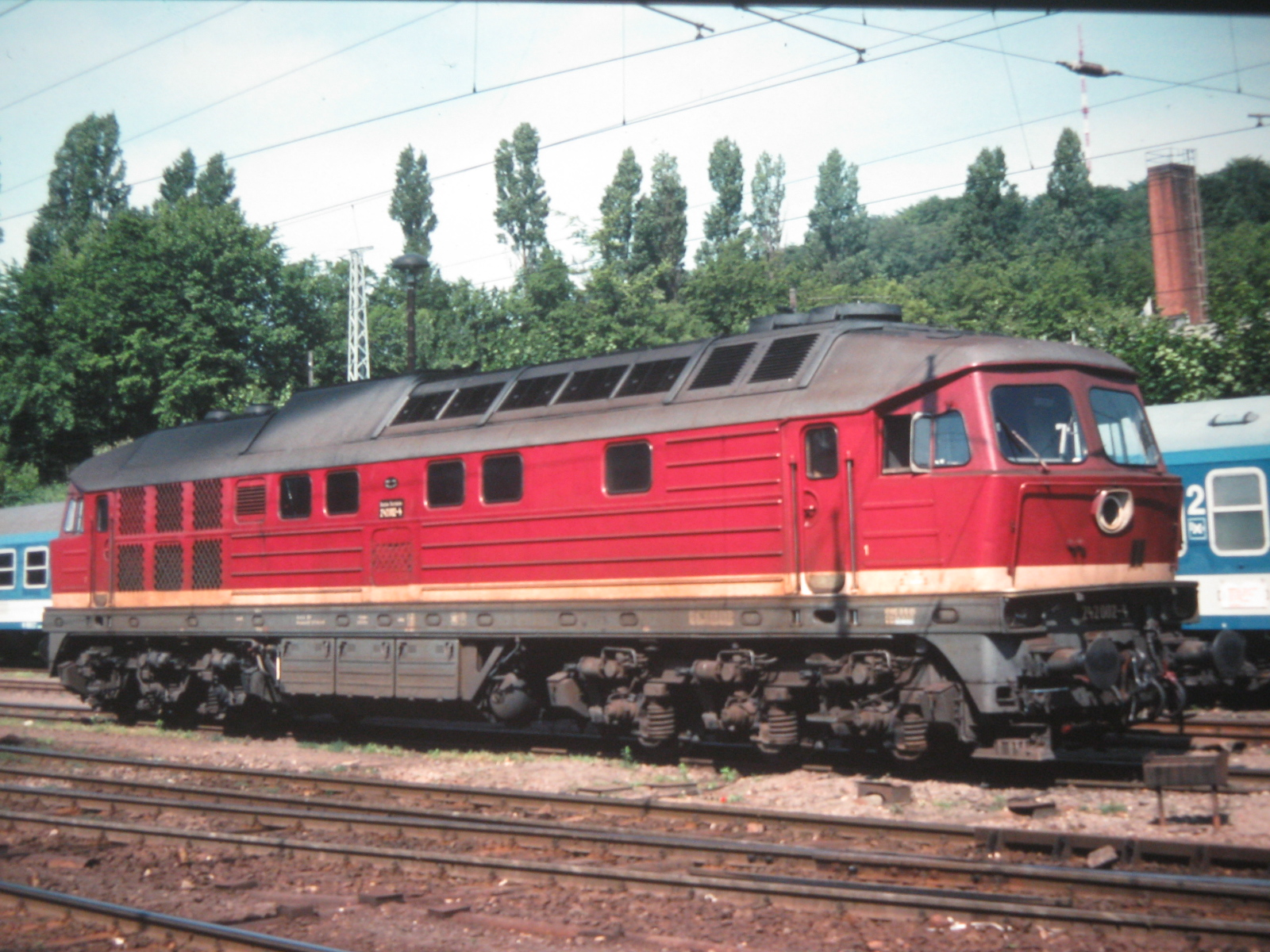
- DR 242 in Stralsund (June 1993)
Type and origin
- Power type: Diesel-electric
- Builder: October Revolution Locomotive Works
- Serial number: DR 130 001–080, 101, 102 DR 131 001–076, 158, 160, 164; DR 132 001–709 DR 142 001–006
- Build date: 1973–1982
- Total produced: DR 130.0: 80; DR 130.1: 2 DR 131: 76; DR 132: 709; DBAG 233: 64; DBAG 234: 64; DBAG 241: 10; DR 142: 6
Specifications
- Configuration
  - UIC: Co′Co′
- Gauge: 1,435 mm (4 ft 8 1/2 in)
- Wheel diameter: 1,050 mm (41.34 in)
- Length: DR Class 130.001 to 080 (DB Class 230), 131 (DB Class 231): 20.620 m (67 ft 7.8 in); DR Classes 130.101 and 102, 132 (DB Class 232), DB Class 233, 234, 241, DR Class 142 (DB Class 242): 20.820 m (68 ft 3.7 in)
- Loco weight: DR 130,131 : 116 t (114 long tons; 128 short tons) DR 132, DBAG 233,234,241 : 120 t (120 long tons; 130 short tons) DR 142 : 126 t (124 long tons; 139 short tons)
- Fuel type: Diesel
- Prime mover: Kolomna Locomotive Works 5D49 (16TschN26/26), 3000 HP in class 130, 131, 132, 230, 231, 232, 234
Performance figures
- Maximum speed: DR 130, DBAG 234: 140 km/h (87 mph) DR 131, DBAG 241: 100 km/h (62 mph) DR 132, DBAG 233, DR 142: 120 km/h (75 mph)
- Power output: DR 130, 131, 132, 234: 2,208 kW (2,961 hp) DBAG 233: 2,206 kW (2,958 hp) DB 241, DR 142: 2.940 kW (3.943 hp)
- Tractive effort: Starting (?)
Career
- Operators: Originally Deutsche Reichsbahn (East Germany) inherited by Deutsche Bahn AG; Also post DBAG use - various private operators
- Nicknames: Ludmilla
- Delivered: 1973–1982 to DR

The DR 130 family of locomotives comprises the DR Class 130 (DBAG Class 230), DR Class 131 (DBAG Class 231), DR Class 132 (DBAG Class 232 as well as Classes 233, 234 and 241 produced through modifications) and DR Class 142 (DBAG Class 242), in USSR locomotive called TE109 (DBAG 230/1/2) and TE129 (DBAG 242).

They were produced in the Soviet Union in Luhansk, Ukraine, from the 1970s onwards, and were imported into the GDR. After the reunification of Germany the Deutsche Bahn (DBAG) inherited them and continue to make use of them mainly as heavy freight locomotives.

Nicknamed Ludmilla, over 700 units were produced between 1970 and 1982. Two of these machines are classed as works vehicles with the designation Class 754.

== History ==
During the 1960s the East German government decided to focus on diesel traction. Due to Comecon trade and export regulations the GDR had to stop their production of diesel-hydraulic locomotives with more than 2000 HP, as construction of mainline railway locomotives was designated to the USSR. Instead the GDR imported heavy-duty engines from the USSR, starting with the a version of the M62 (the famous "Taiga drum") known as the V200 (later Class 120; Class 220 after reunification) for freight trains.

Lacking electric train supply and with a top speed of 100 km/h (62 mph) the Class 120s were unsuitable for passenger work; to meet these demands the Luhansk locomotive works introduced the DR Class 130 in 1970 capable of a top speed of 140 km/h (87 mph). Unfortunately the Soviet industry could not provide an electric heating feature, therefore the engines were restricted to freight trains for which their gearing was too high. Subsequently, the 'DR Class 131 with a reduced top speed of 100 km/h (62 mph) (and thus a higher tractive force) was delivered for freight services.

When in 1972 an electric heating system was available, two prototypes 130 101 and 130 102 were constructed. Due to poor track conditions in GDR the top speed was limited to 120 km/h (75 mph), and so the DR Class 132s top speed was reduced to that. This class became the backbone of GDR diesel traction. Later six 2,940 kW (3,940 hp) DR Class 142 units were produced in 1977, but due to the planned electrification of many major lines such powerful engines were not necessary any more.

After reunification Classes were renumbered according to West German practice, thus as mainline diesels the prefix "2" was necessary: the Class 130 was renumbered to DBAG Class 230 and Class 131 to DBAG Class 231; both were soon pulled out of service. The renumbered DBAG Class 232 are still in service and have taken over many freight services in Western Germany.

64 Class 132s underwent reconstruction under DBAG ownership, forming the classes 234 (top speed 140 km/h (87 mph), 64 class 232 were rebuilt to class 233 (new 12-cylinder Russian engine with 3000 HP) and 10 class 232 were rebuilt to class 241 (new engines with 2,940 kW (3,940 hp) and 62 mph (100 km/h). The class 241 without electrical heating was only designed for heavy good trains up to 4000 metric tons between Germany and Belgium or the Netherlands.)

== Design ==
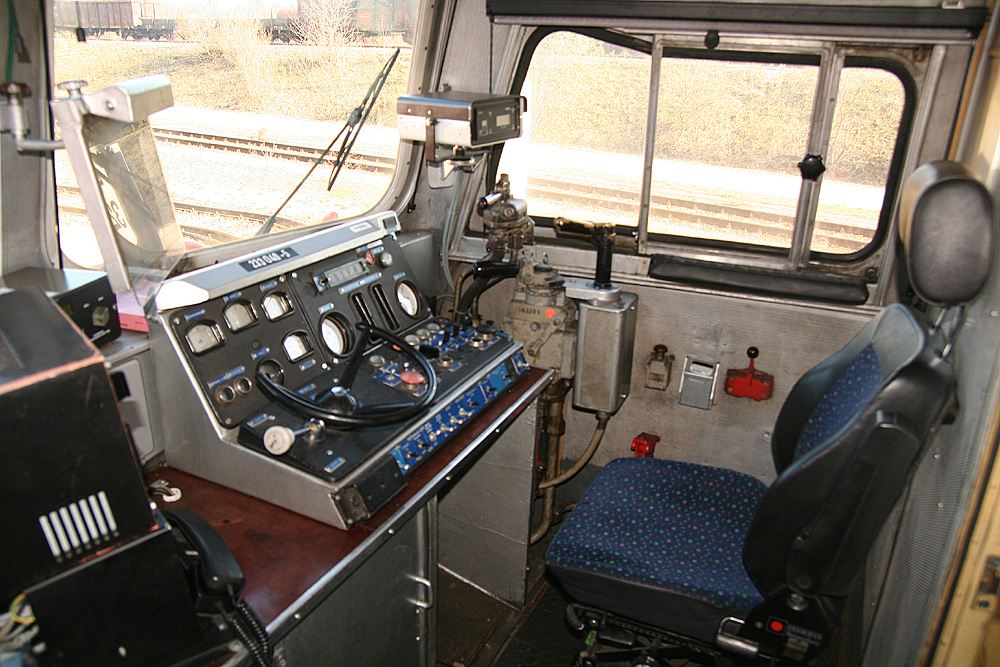
Driving cab of a DBAG Class 232

The locomotives are constructed on a steel frame with attached carbody; units with electric heating are 200 mm (7.87 in) longer due to the extra space requirements.

The two 3-axle bogies pivot on a central pin, with primary suspension being of the coil spring type with additional dampers. The power transmission is electric. In the original Class 130 a 16-cylinder turbo-charged diesel engine created electric energy for the nose-suspended DC traction motors. (Some rebuilt locomotives have 12-cylinder engines).

Due to construction and the electric power transmission the class 232 locomotives are very heavy. The axle load of 20.3 t allows usage only on main lines.

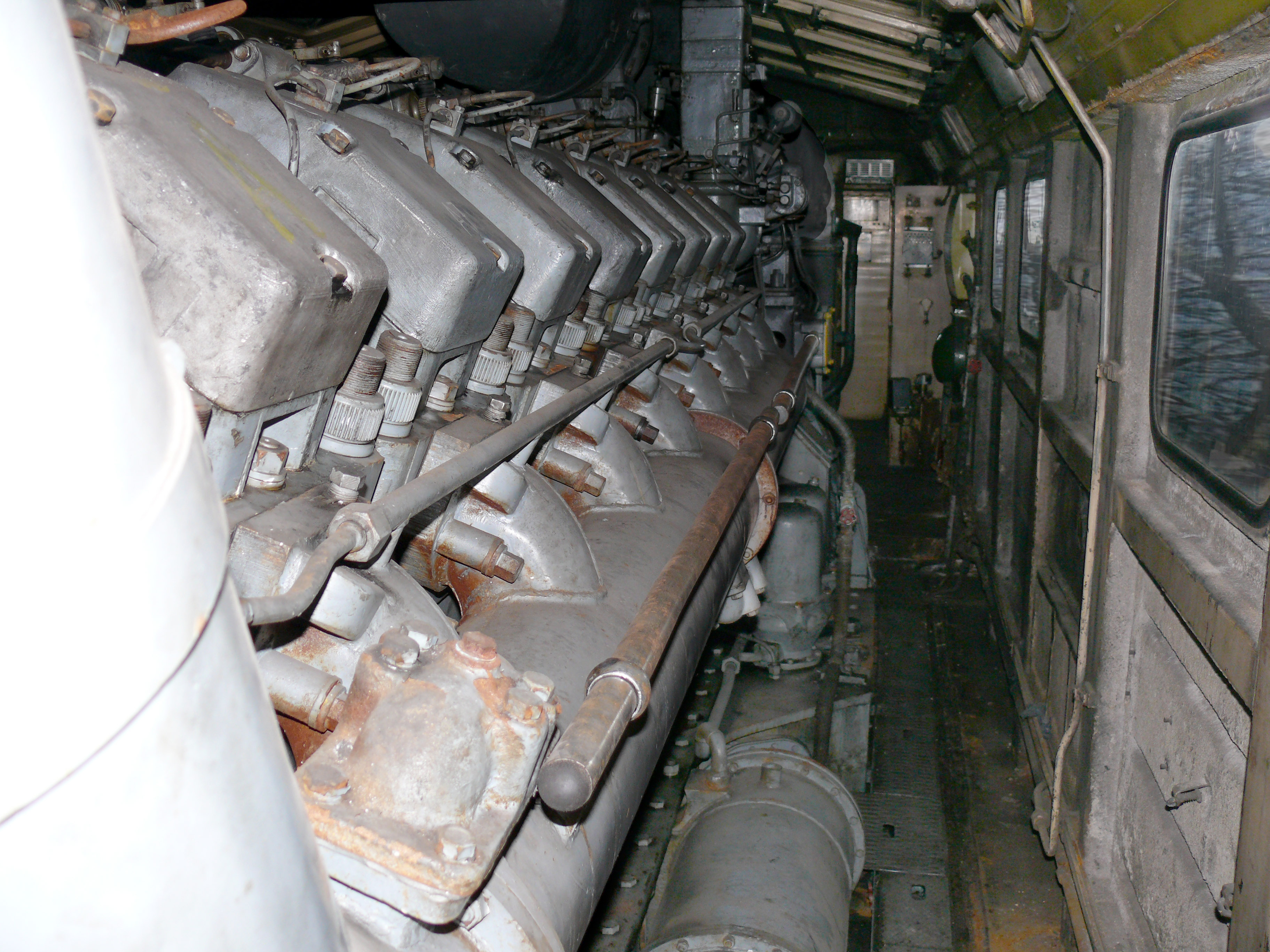
Side view of 5D49 engine

The power for the unmodified classes is powered by a direct-injection, 16-cylinder, four-stroke, Diesel engine (of type 5D49) delivering when turbocharged 2,200 kW (3,000 hp) The fuel capacity is 6000 litres, additionally 1100 litres of engine oil is used.

The diesel engine of the V 300 had significant initial problems; the original crankshaft was made from ductile cast iron but was prone to cracking, particularly after the winter. The cast cranks were replaced with forged versions providing running for 20,000 hours, but initially they suffered from low surface hardness; this problem was solved by nitriding the surface, and by locally heating the surface with a CO_{2} laser (see annealing).

The engine drives an AC generator whose current is rectified by six-way rectification using 240 diodes. Traction motor power control is achieved via the engine (i. e. using the throttle) and by thyristor 'choppers'.

== Classes ==
=== DR Class 130 / DBAG Class 230 ===
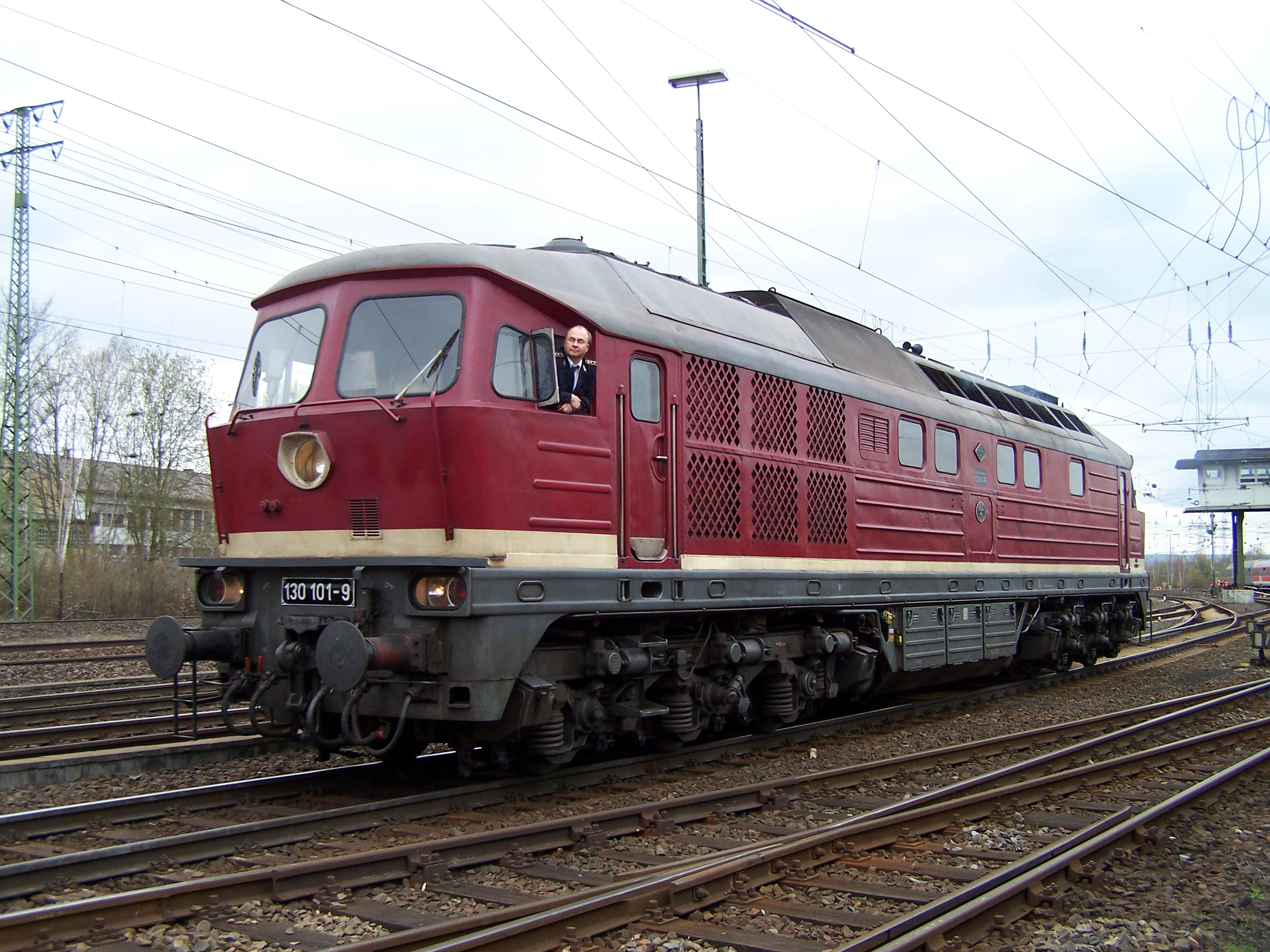
DR 130, DB Museum, Koblenz

The class was unveiled at the Leipzig Spring Fair in 1970 as 300 001 V, the locomotives were trialled by the VES-M in Halle as the Class 130, and this designation was carried into service.

The first locomotive was given to the Leipzig Hbf-South railway, and it was here that the nickname Ludmilla was given to these machines.

The 80 machines in the Class 130 series had bogies and gearing suitable for movement at 140 km/h (87 mph), but without train heating, so were used mainly for heavy freight service (a task for which they were not optimally suited, being geared for 140 km/h (87 mph) with a corresponding lower tractive effort.)

All but a few locomotives had their top speed reduced to 100 km/h (62 mph) - these locomotives ran as the subclass DR 131.1.

The two test machines for electric heating were given the operating numbers 130 101 and 102, being structurally most similar to the main tranche of Class 130s.

After reunification the machines became members of Class 230, previously this designation had applied to the single DB Class V 200 variant also known as V 300.001

=== DR Class 131 / DBAG Class 231 ===
When it became evident that the locomotives would be used mainly for freight due to the lack of electric heating, the Reichsbahn ordered the next 76 locomotives with maximum speed of only 100 km/h (62 mph) (without electric brake). These 76 machines were classified as Series 131. After 1990 the Adtranz company built new "Caterpillar 3606"-engines with 1850 kW (2500 HP) in four 231.

=== DR Class 132 / DBAG Class 232 and variants ===
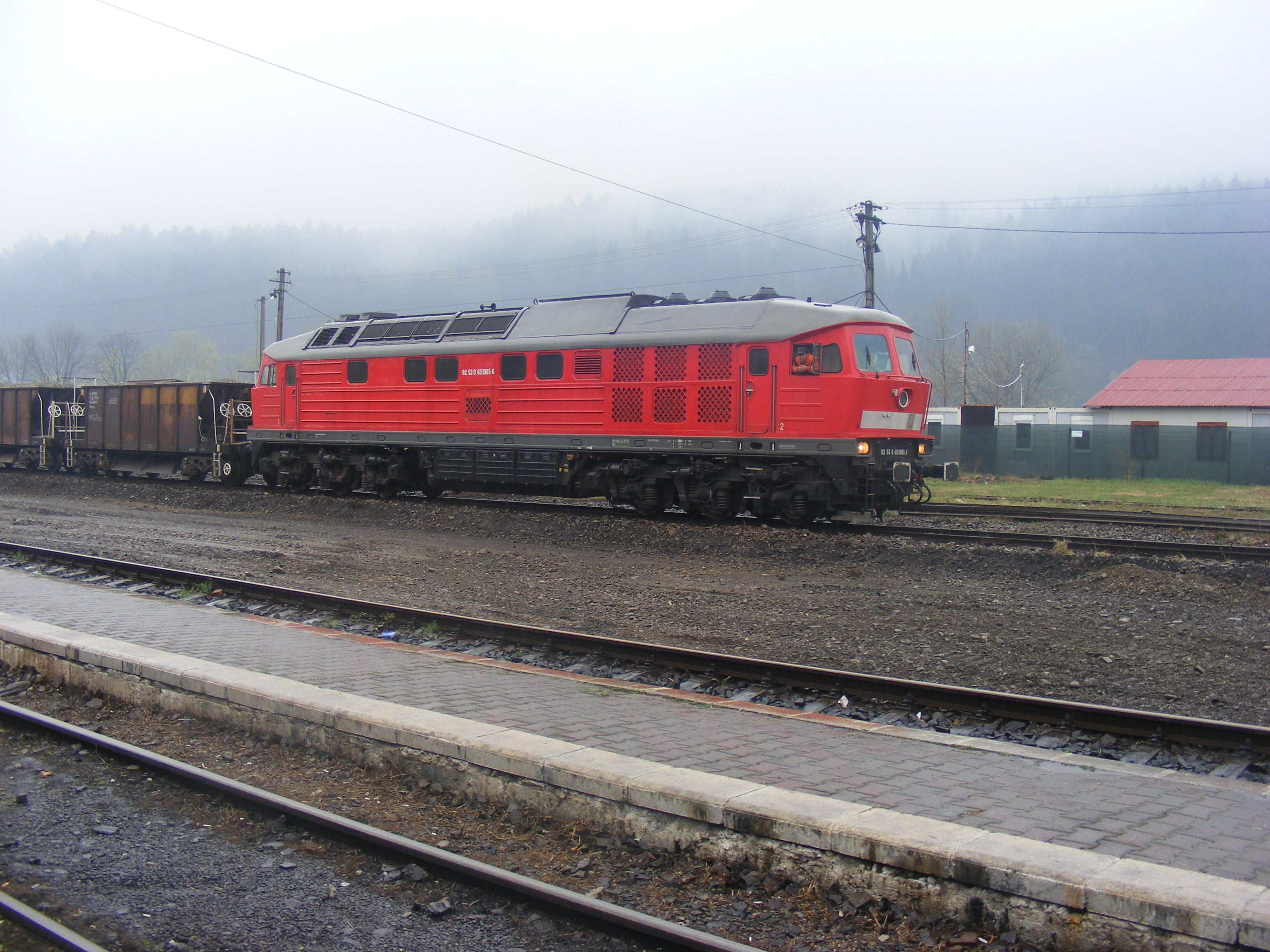
232 614-8 of DB Schenker in Piatra Neamt, Romania. This version is the most widespread in the class, and this exact example was made in 1979

The development of the DR Class 132 was spurred by Voroshilovgrad Locomotive Works' new capability to provide locomotives with electric heating.

The first two test machines (built in 1972) had a maximum allowable speed of 140 km/h (87 mph) and were therefore considered to be of Class 130 numbers 101 and 102. They were always stationed at the test centre VES-M Halle, and when incorporation into the new Deutsche Bahn came they were classed as the 754 series. (Note: The 7xx class designations are used for infrastructure, testing and maintenance vehicles)

The Class 132s entered service in 1974, 709 locomotives of this class were built. Under the Deutsche Reichsbahn the maximum allowable line speed was limited and so in operation these locomotives had a top speed of 120 km/h (75 mph).

Under the Deutsche Bahn numerous locomotives of this class were rebuilt:

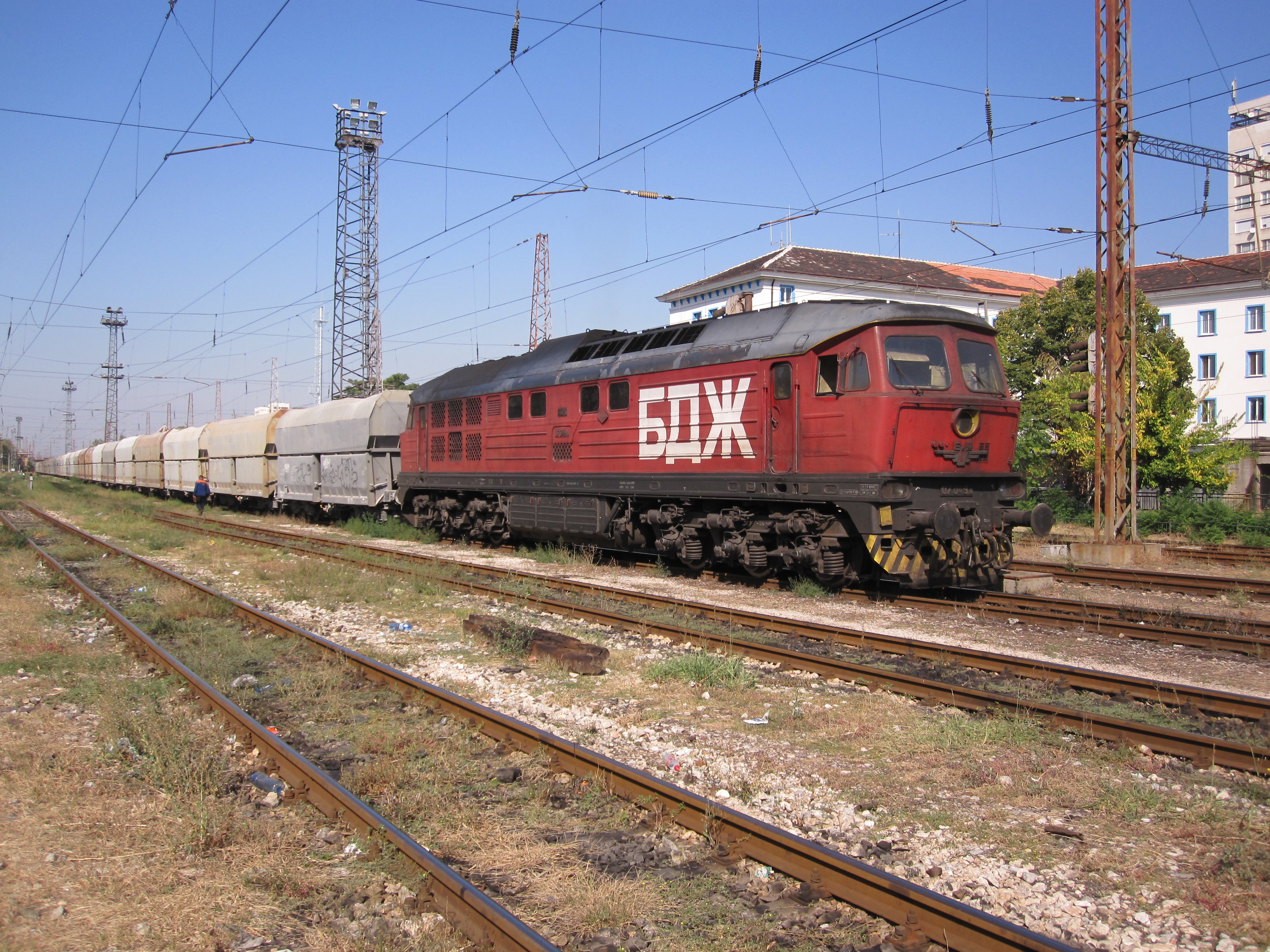
Bulgarian Railways class 07. 90 of these were made between 1972 and 1977

==== DBAG Class 232.9 ====
Some of Class 234 which had been upgraded to 140 km/h (87 mph) operations were subsequently returned to 120 km/h (75 mph) top speed operation.

==== DBAG Class 233 ====
These locomotives were renovated and remotorised with Kolomna 12 D 49 M engines, and other more minor improvements: A replacement engine for the 232 series was sought because the engine was reaching its wear limit. Different new engines were tested: a Caterpillar engine, a MaK engine and the Russian 12 D 49 M. For cost reasons and because the Russian engine could be used with the fewest modifications the 12 D 49 M was selected. However, the Russian producer proved no longer capable of supplying this engine, as a result an engine largely similar to the 12 D 49 M but with only twelve cylinders was supplied. This engine can have sets of cylinders turned off to save fuel at low workloads. By 2003, 65 locomotives had been rebuilt.

==== DBAG Class 234 ====
Converted for operation at 140 km/h (87 mph) using higher speed bogies found in the scrapped Class 130s. 64 examples were made.

==== DBAG Class 241 ====
Ten examples of the Class 232 were converted in 1997 for freight only operation with a new diesel engine of increased power output of 4,000 hp (2,980 kW), as well as new electrical transmission components (including anti-wheel-slip provision) and enhanced brakes. The top speed was reduced to only 100 km/h (62 mph).

=== DR Class 142 / DBAG Class 242 ===
Between 1977 and 1978 six locomotives with a power of 4,000 hp (2,980 kW) were built, and designated Class 142 in operation. However, it had been decided at the political level that the main lines would be electrified, thus there would be no need in future for such a powerful locomotive, as a result no further machines were built.

The Class 142 was the most powerful single-engined diesel in Europe (along with the DSB MZ III/IV class, the rebuilt DBAG 241 and the SNCF Class CC 72000) until 2006 when the Voith Maxima 40 CC was built with an even greater power of 3,600 kW (4,830 hp) (this power had been already reached in 1975 by the French prototype CC 72075).

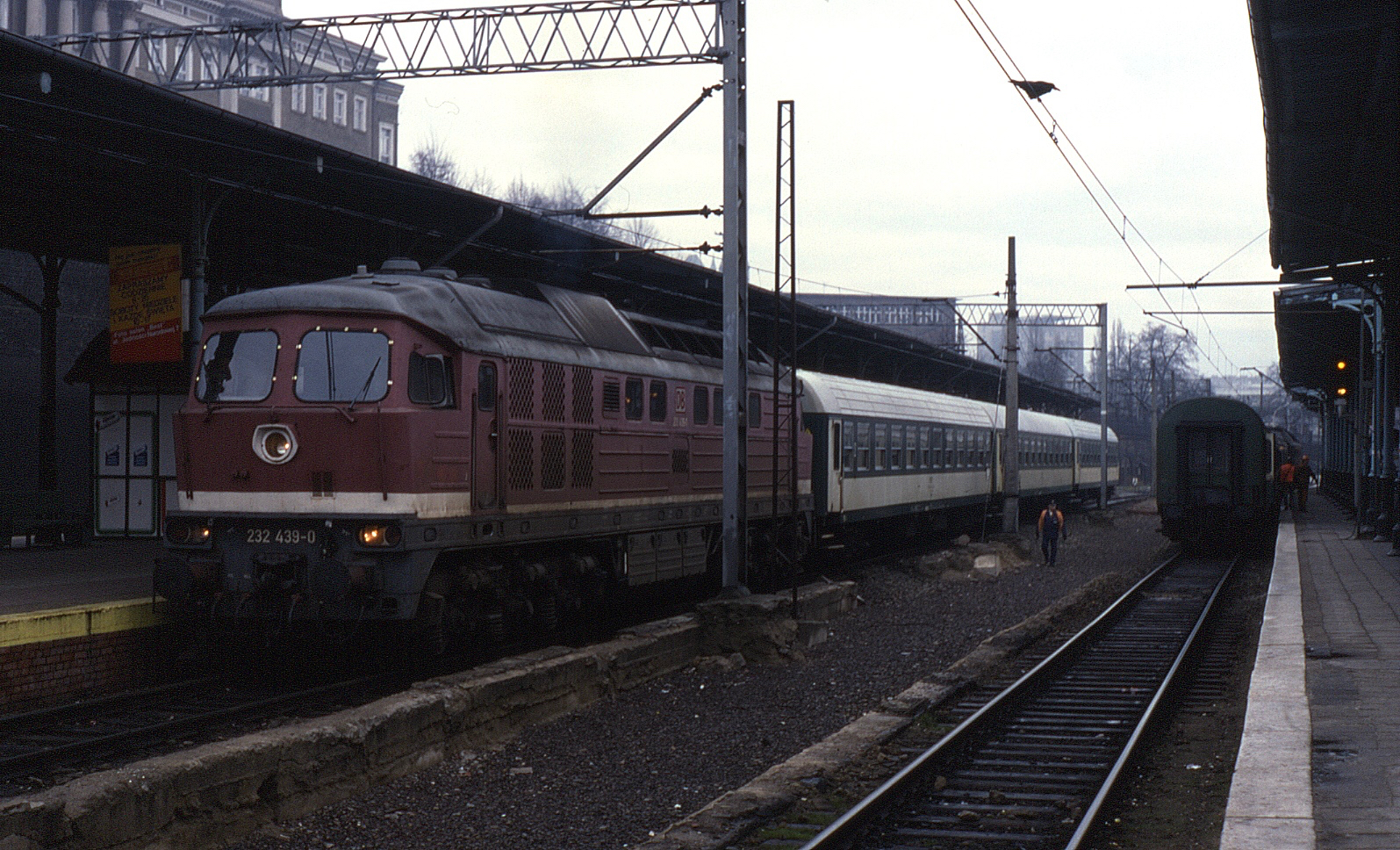
232 439 at Szczecin Główny, Poland with a local train

== Usage ==
During GDR times the class 132 pulled everything that was fast or heavy such as express trains on non-electrified lines or coal or lime trains of 1800 to 2200 tonnes in weight. Due to the higher axle load and weight their use was not as flexible as the DR Class 118 and DR Class 119.

After the Berlin Wall came down in 1989, these locomotives would take their trains outside the former GDR, with Hamburg, Kassel, Nuremberg and Kiel being destinations. With the merger of the two German train companies in 1994 the Ludmillas were seen even further afield – taking over many of the workings of the DB Class V 160 family – due to their higher power.

After restructuring of DBAG the Class 232 locomotives were assigned to DB Cargo (now Railion) for freight services. Class 232 locomotives could be seen all through Germany and also operating in the Netherlands, the higher-power Class 241 are mainly used on heavy (up to 4000 metrical tons) freight trains between Germany and Belgium or the Netherlands. These were replaced in the Netherlands in 2006 by Baureihe 189 locomotives. The higher-powered Class 242 also worked extremely heavy (up to 3600 metrical tons) oil trains between Rostock Port and Schwedt Refinery "PCK". Five locomotives are now in private ownership, the sixth locomotive, the 242 006, was demolished in 2009 in Cottbus for recycling. The 4000 HP-engines of the 242 002 – 242 005 was changed, now this four locomotives have a Kolomna 12D 49-engine with 3000 HP.

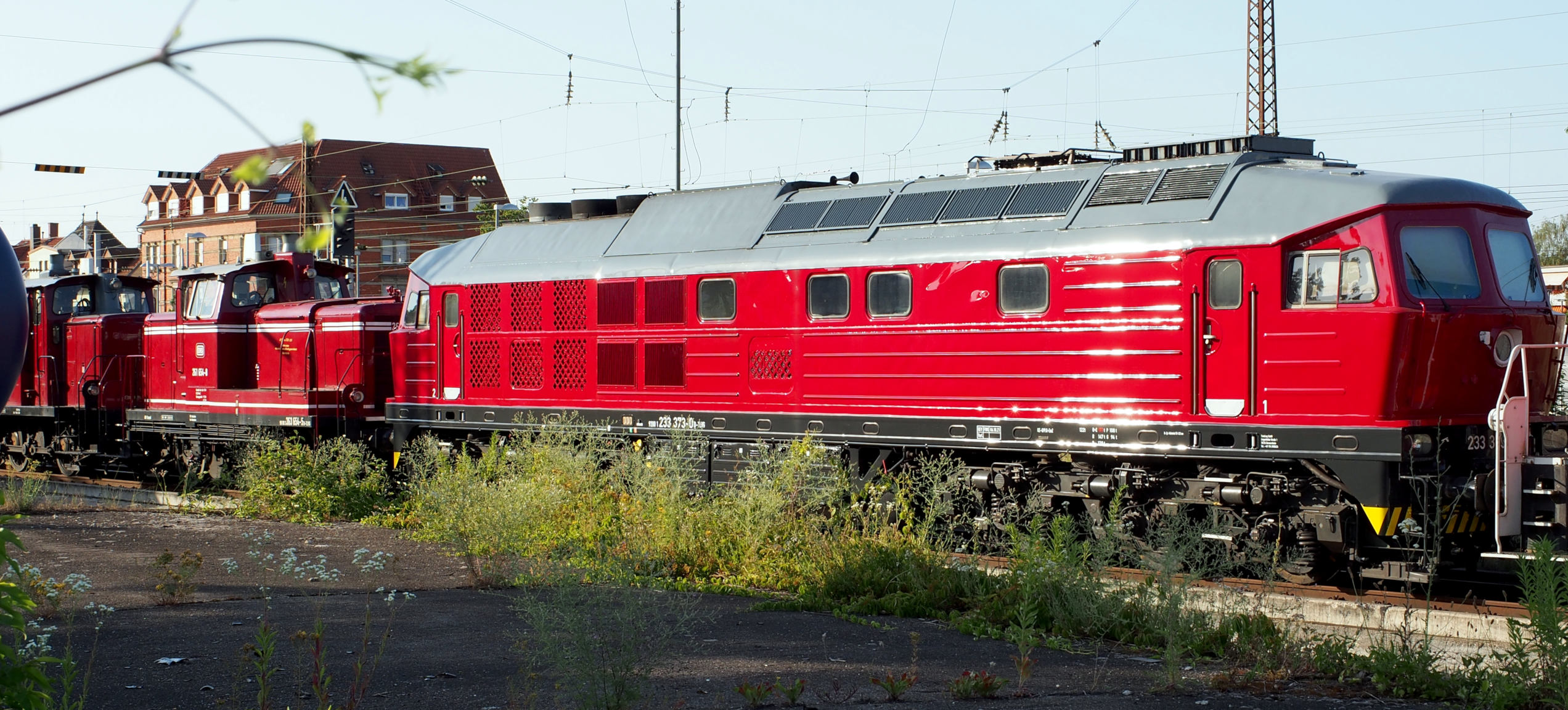
233 373 of private operator TrainLog, 2022 in Mannheim Harbour

Some intercity services (such as the Berlin-Warsaw express) (Note: As of November 2008) are still provided by DB Fernverkehr using the higher speed Class 234s. These were later replaced by Polish EuroSprinter locomotives. Four locomotives was used for Intercity's between Ulm and Lindau (Lake constance).

The locomotives are still (2016) used in Germany, Poland, Romania and Hungary.

=== Retirement ===
The Class 230s were the first of the family to be withdrawn, next went locomotives of the type 231, since without train heating they had no use. A few of these classes were acquired by private companies including EBW, others are in museums.

The 242 series were also withdrawn from DBAG usage, but have since entered private use.

As of February 2009 locomotives of Class 232 with its variants 233, 234 and 241 are still in main line work.

== Variants ==
Similar engines were produced for other Soviet bloc countries:

- Bulgaria: 07, similar to class 131.
- Czech Republic, Slovakia: T679.2 similar to class 132.
- USSR: TЭ109, double engines 2TЭ109, TЭ125, TЭ129.

== See also ==
- Numbering scheme of the German railways
