= Mile (given name) =

Mile is a masculine given name found in Croatia, Bosnia, Serbia, Montenegro, North Macedonia and Bulgaria. It is often found as a contraction of Milan or Miodrag.

Notable people with the name include:

- Mile Akmadžić (born 1939), Bosnian Croat politician
- Mile Bogović (1939–2020), Croatian Catholic bishop
- Mile Budak (1889–1945), Croatian fascist politician and writer
- Mile Dedaković (born 1951), Croatian soldier
- Mile Ilić (born 1984), Serbian basketball player
- Mile Isakov (born 1950), Serbian journalist and politician
- Mile Isaković (born 1958), Serbian handball player and coach
- Mile Janakieski, Republic of Macedonia politician
- Mile Jedinak (born 1984), Australian soccer player of Croatian descent
- Mile Kitić (born 1952), Bosnian-born Serbian singer
- Mile Klopčič (1905–1984), Slovenian poet
- Mile Knežević (born 1971), Serbian football player
- Mile Kos (1925–2014), Serbian football player, coach and sportswriter
- Mile Krajina (c. 1923–2014), Croatian gusle player
- Mile Krstev (born 1979), Macedonian football player
- Mile Lojpur (1930–2005), Serbian rock musician
- Mile Markovski (1939–1975), Bulgarian and Macedonian writer
- Mile Martić (born 1954), Croatian Serb politician
- Mile Matić (1956–1994), Yugoslav spree killer
- Mile Mećava (1915–1942), Bosnian Serb partisan
- Mile Mijušković (born 1985), Montenegrin handball player
- Mile Milovac (born 1965), Serbian American soccer player
- Mile Mrkšić (1947–2015), Serbian soldier
- Mile Nakić (born 1942), Croatian water polo player and coach
- Mile Nedelkoski (1935–2020), Macedonian poet
- Mile Novaković (1950–2015), Croatian Serb general
- Mile Novković (born 1950), Serbian footballer
- Mile Pajic (born 1955), Dutch motorcycle racer
- Mile V. Pajić (born 1958), Serbian visual artist
- Mile Perković (1920–2013), Yugoslav Partisan and sports administrator
- Mile Pešorda, Bosnian Croat writer
- Mile Petković (born 1953), Croatian football manager
- Mile Petrović, Croatian rower
- Mile Protić (born 1950), Serbian basketball coach
- Mile Popyordanov (1877–1901), Bulgarian Macedonian revolutionary
- Mile Savković (born 1992), Serbian football player
- Mile Smodlaka (born 1976), Croatian water polo player and coach
- Mile Starčević (1862–1917), Croatian politician
- Mile Starčević (1904–1953), Croatian politician
- Mile Sterjovski (born 1979), Australian football player
- Mile Stojkoski (born 1965), Macedonian parathlete
- Mile Svilar (born 1999), Belgian footballer of Serbian descent
- Mile Škorić (born 1991), Croatian football player
- Mile Uzelac (born 1978), Croatian handball player
- Mile Zechevikj, Macedonian politician

== See also ==
- Mila (given name)
