= Milady (given name) =

Milady is a feminine given name with diverse origins. It may refer to an English courtesy title for an English gentlewoman. Alternately, it is possibly a spelling variant of the Czech name Milada.

It may refer to:

- Milady Félix de L'Official (1906-2001), Dominican lawyer, writer, politician, and diplomat
- Milady Tack-Fang (born 1949), Cuban Olympic fencer
