= DB Class V 100 =

German diesel powered locomotive

DB Class V 100.10 later: DB Class 211 and: DB Class 212, 213, 214
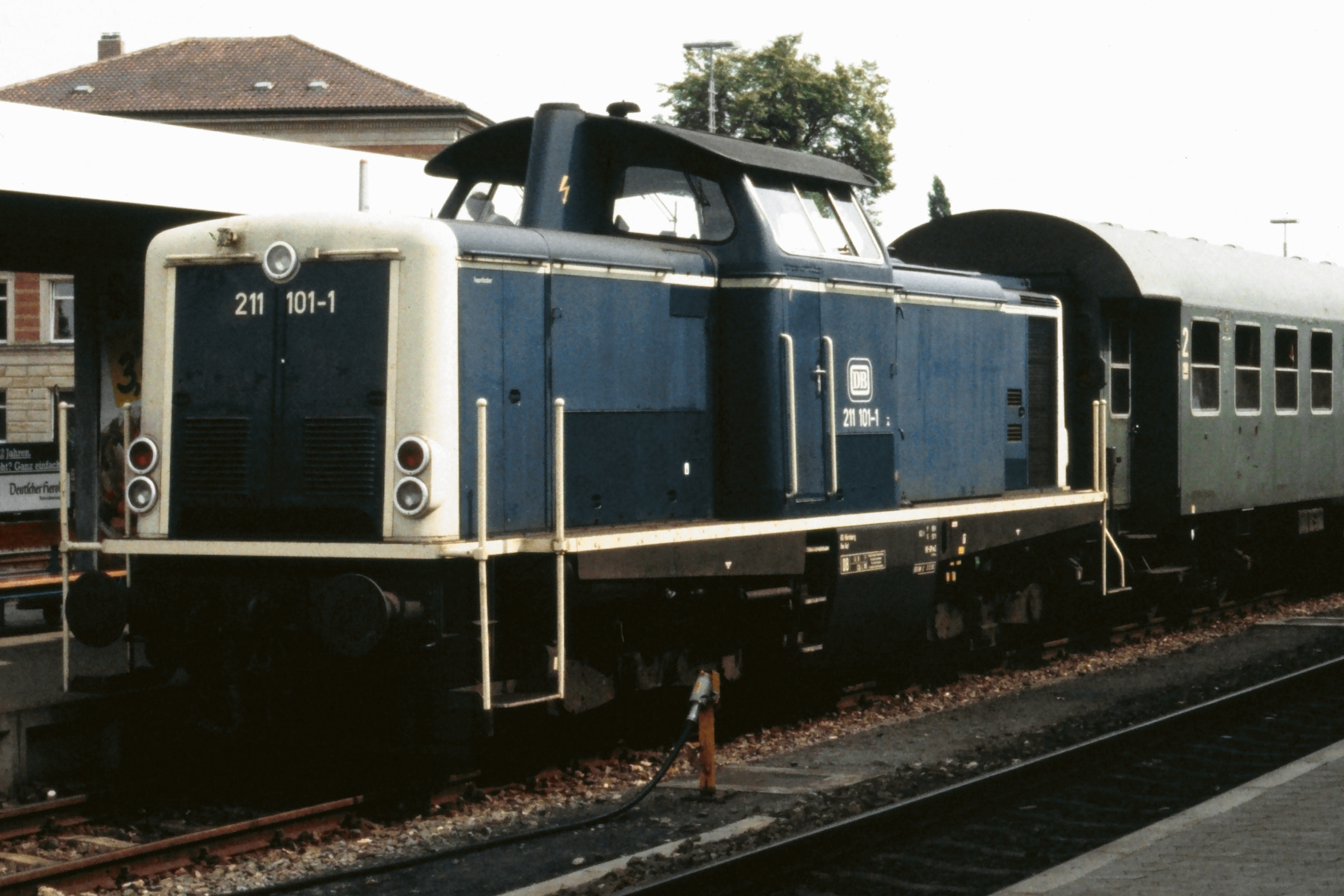
- 211 101 in 1986
Type and origin
- Power type: Diesel-hydraulic
- Builder: Maschinenbau Kiel (95); Arnold Jung Lokomotivfabrik (47); Klöckner Humboldt Deutz (55); Henschel (55); Krupp (50); Krauss-Maffei (50); Maschinenfabrik Esslingen (12)
- Build date: 1958–1963
- Total produced: 364
Specifications
- Configuration
  - UIC: B′B′
- Gauge: 1,435 mm (4 ft 8 1/2 in)
- Wheel diameter: 950 mm (3 ft 1 3/8 in)
- Wheelbase
  - Bogie: 2,200 mm (7 ft 2 5/8 in)
- Pivot centres: 6,000 mm (19 ft 8 1/4 in)
- Length
  - Over buffers: 12,100 mm (39 ft 8 3/8 in)
- Height: 3,990 mm (13 ft 1 1/8 in)
- Axle load: 15.5 t (15.3 long tons; 17.1 short tons)
- Service weight: 62.0 t (61.0 long tons; 68.3 short tons)
- Fuel type: Diesel
- Prime mover: Maybach MD 650 or; Daimler-Benz MB 820 Bb or; MAN L 12 V 18/21 or; MAN V 6 V 18/21 or; Daimler-Benz MB 835 Ab
- Engine type: 12-cylinder four-stroke diesel
- Cylinders: 12
- Transmission: Voith, Torque converter
- MU working: None
- Train heating: None
- Loco brake: Knorr compressed-air brake
- Train brakes: Air
- Safety systems: Sifa/Indusi
- Couplers: Screwlink
Performance figures
- Maximum speed: 90 km/h (56 mph); from 211 008: 100 km/h (62 mph)
- Power output
  - Continuous: 809 kW (1,100 PS; 1,085 hp)
- Power index: 13.0 kW/t (17.7 PS/t)
- Tractive effort
  - Starting: 177 kN (40,000 lb_{f})
Career
- Operators: Deutsche Bundesbahn
- Class: V100^{10}, 211 from 1968
- Numbers: V 100 1001 – V 100 1005, V 100 1007 – V 100 1365; from 1968: 211 001 – 211 005, 211 007 – 211 365
- Retired: 2001

These DB Class V 100 diesel locomotives were produced in the late 1950s by the Deutsche Bundesbahn for non-electrified branch lines as a replacement for steam locomotives. The V 100 class was built in three different variants.

Decommissioned locomotives were also used in Austria by the Austrian Federal Railways during the 1990s and early 2000s, where they were registered as ÖBB Class 2048

== Class V 100.10 / Class 211 ==
The Class V 100.10 was a diesel locomotive for light passenger and goods traffic on branch lines. It was developed in 1956 by the Bundesbahn Central Office in Munich together with the engineering works, Maschinenbau Kiel (MaK), for the Deutsche Bundesbahn.

In the late autumn of 1958 the first six trials engines were delivered. Numbers V 100 001 to 005 were fitted with an 809 kW (1,100 HP) motor, but number V 100 006 was given a 993 kW (1,350 HP) motor. The latter formed the basis for the V 100.20, later DB Class 212. Number V 100 007 was built by MaK as the seventh trial engine and tested in Sweden; it was sold in 1959 to the Deutsche Bundesbahn. In 1960, the prototype series, numbers 001 to 005 and 007 were renumbered to V 100 1001 to 1005 and 1007 in order to better distinguish them from the more powerful V 100 006. In 1961 the production series was started, the run lasting until 1963. As well as MaK, the firms of Deutz, Maschinenfabrik Esslingen, Henschel, Jung, Krauss-Maffei and Krupp were involved in building the locomotives.

As part of the renumbering of locomotives by the Deutsche Bundesbahn in 1968, the V 100.10 was redesignated as DB Class 211. The Deutsche Bahn AG inherited the locomotives in 1994.

After almost 40 years service the last engine was withdrawn in 2001.

== Class V 100.20 / Classes 212 and 213 ==
DB Class V 100.20 DB Classes 212 and 213
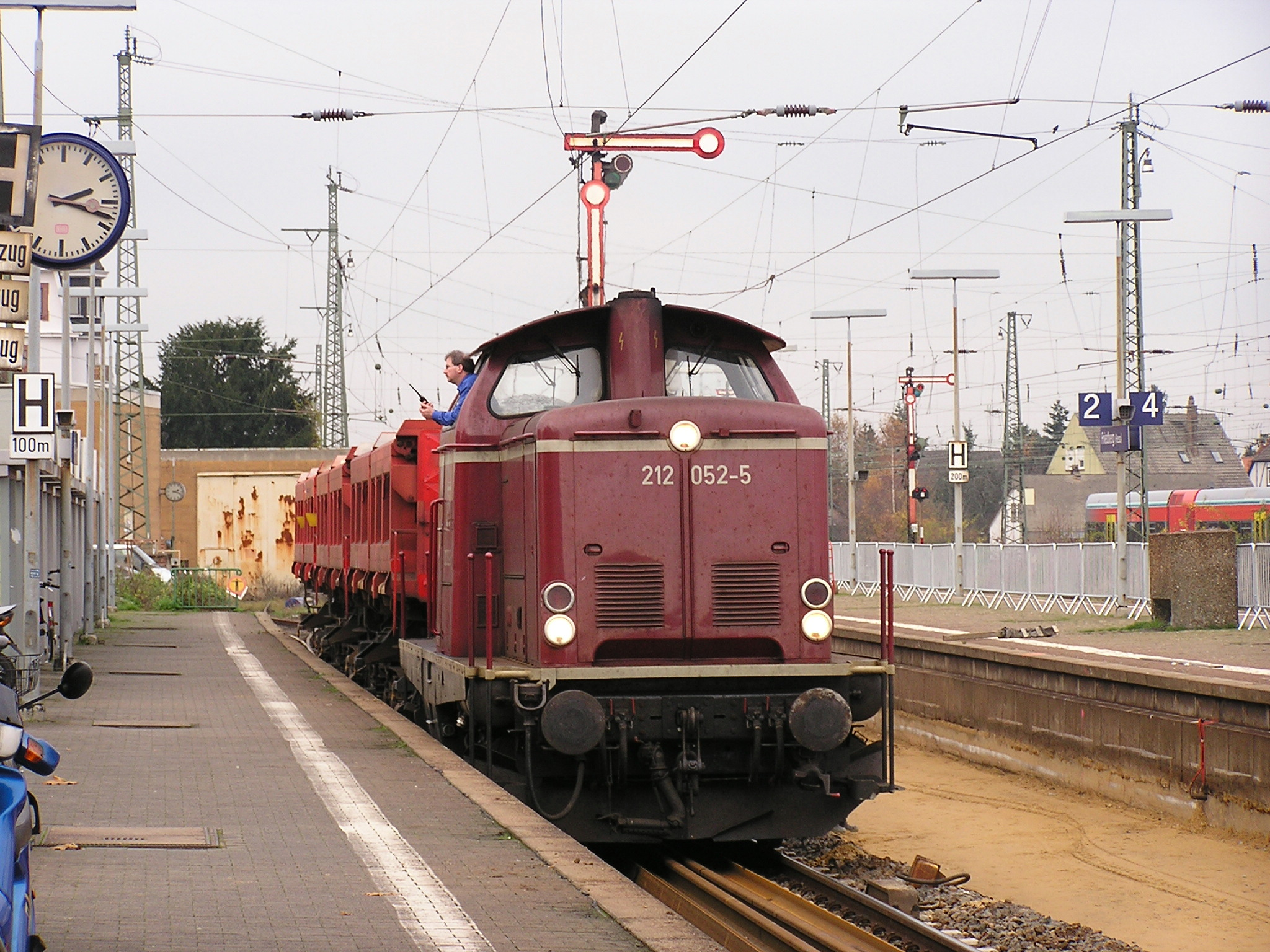
- 212 052-5 in purpurrot in Friedberg
Type and origin
- Power type: Diesel-hydraulic
- Builder: Maschinenbau Kiel (216); Henschel (58); Arnold Jung Lokomotivfabrik (37); Klöckner Humboldt Deutz (70)
- Build date: 1959, 1962–1966
- Total produced: 381
Specifications
- Configuration
  - UIC: B′B′
- Gauge: 1,435 mm (4 ft 8 1/2 in)
- Wheel diameter: 950 mm (3 ft 1 3/8 in)
- Wheelbase
  - Engine: 8,200 mm (26 ft 10 7/8 in)
  - Bogie: 2,200 mm (7 ft 2 5/8 in)
- Pivot centres: 6,000 mm (19 ft 8 1/4 in)
- Length
  - Over buffers: 12,100 mm (39 ft 8 3/8 in); from 212 022 12,300 mm (40 ft 4 1/4 in)
- Height: 4,275 mm (14 ft 1/4 in)
- Axle load: 15.8 t (15.6 long tons; 17.4 short tons)
- Service weight: 63.0 t (62.0 long tons; 69.4 short tons)
- Fuel type: Diesel fuel
- Fuel capacity: 2,500 L (550 imp gal; 660 US gal)
- Prime mover: MTU 12V652 TA/TZ10
- Engine type: V12 four-stroke diesel
- Loco brake: Knorr compressed-air brake
- Safety systems: Sifa/Indusi
Performance figures
- Maximum speed: Shunt: 65 km/h (40 mph); Line: 100 km/h (62 mph)
- Power output
  - Continuous: 1,350 PS (993 kW; 1,330 hp)
- Power index: 15.8 kW/t (21.5 PS/t)
- Tractive effort
  - Starting: 177 kN (40,000 lb_{f})
Career
- Operators: Deutsche Bundesbahn
- Class: V 100^{20}, 212 and 213 from 1968
- Numbers: V 100 2001 – V 100 2381; from 1968: 212 001 – 212 331, 212 342 – 212 381, 213 332 – 213 341

The DB Class V 100.20 (later Class 212) is a more powerful variant of the V 100. It was based on the prototype V 100 006, which from 1960 was renumbered to V 100 2001. It went into series production in 1962 and, unlike the V 100.10 which was employed on branch line service, it was also intended for main line duties and ramps. Up to 1966 a total of 381 examples entered service. The Class 212 is 12.1 metres long (from no. 022: 12.3 m) and weighs 63 tonnes. Its top speed is 100 km/h and its engine generates 993 kW (1,350 PS).

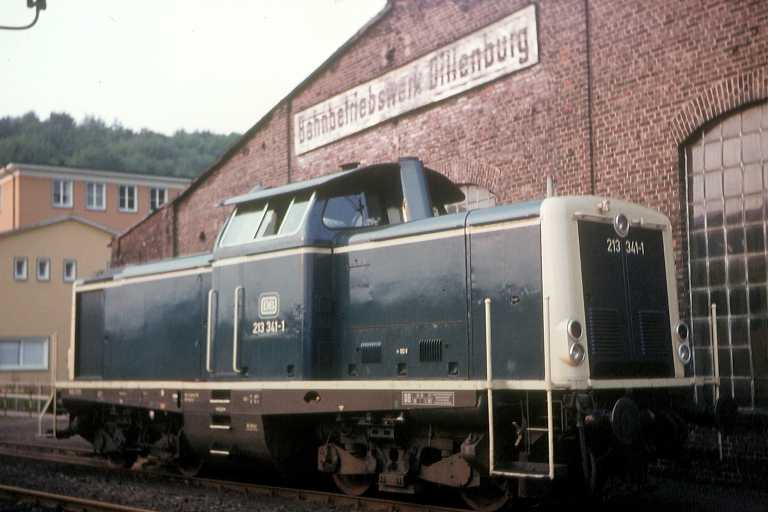
213 341 in Dillenburg 1983

Ten locomotives from the last batch of 150 engines were additionally equipped with stronger brakes and modified drives and were employed on ramps. These locomotives, originally numbered V 100 2332 to 2341 were reclassified in 1968 as DB Class 213. They replaced the steam locomotives of Class 82 and 94 on the Murg Valley Railway and in the Westerwald. In the Murg Valley they were replaced in their turn in 1972 by the DB Class 218.

The last Class 212 was withdrawn from normal service in 2004, some have been preserved or found use with private firms.

== Locomotives of the tunnel rescue train – Class 214/714 ==
Due to the many tunnels on the new railway line from Würzburg to Hanover, special rescue vehicles were needed. The Bundesbahn developed the Tunnel Emergency Train (Tunnelhilfszug or TuHi) as an external rescue system. In May 1988 the first TuHi went into service at Fulda. Diesel engine 212 244-8 was used as Locomotive 1 and 212 257-0 as Locomotive 2. The Würzburg TuHi followed in August 1988 using 212 236-4 as Locomotive 1 and 212 352-9 as Locomotive 2. Number 212 271-1 was held in reserve. All five 212s for TuHi were rebuilt between May and August 1988 at AW Kassel. Both TuHi are one-way trains, i.e. they can only be used in one direction. They consist of transport wagon 1, the equipment wagon, the fire fighting wagon, the centre wagon, the first aid coach and transport wagon 2. Locos 1 and 2 are also different. Loco 1 has a video and infra-red camera, two large and two small headlights and yellow flashing lights. Loco 2 does not have an infra-red camera. With effect from 1 January 1989 the five engines of Class 214 were reclassified, retaining their serial numbers. Official all 5 locos are allocated to Bw Würzburg. Both engines with the Fulda TuHi had "Bw Fulda" incorrectly painted on them.

On 29 May 1991 the Federal President, Richard von Weizsäcker, gave the starting signal at Kassel-Wilhelmshöhe to announce that the new Hannover–Würzburg and Mannheim–Stuttgart high-speed railways were now fully in service. That meant four more locations for TuHi were required. In addition to Fulda and Würzburg, TuHi also had to be stationed at Kornwestheim, Mannheim, Kassel and Hildesheim. The TuHi in Fulda had to be organised as a bidirectional train, so that it could be used in the Würzburg and Kassel directions. To make this possible, another first aid coach has been inserted behind transport wagon 1. By stationing a TuHi at Hildesheim Hbf and Kassel Hbf both directions of the high-speed link can be traversed via link lines. For that reason a unidirectional train is sufficient here. Between August 1990 and April 1991 eight more 212 or 214s were modified at AW Bremen und AW Kassel for the four other TuHi. Locomotives 212 033, 212 046, 212 235, 212 245, 212 246, 212 251, 212 260 and 212 277 were converted to Class 214, all retaining their original serial numbers. There is no difference any longer between locos 1 and 2, in order to be able to exchange them more easily, which is always necessary when carrying out routine maintenance. The former locomotive 2's from Würzburg and Fulda were fitted with the missing infra-red cameras in 1991 at AW Kassel. The cooling of the infra-red cameras is achieved now using the usual liquid air cylinders, which were swapped for the previously used liquid nitrogen flasks. After the serious train accident on 15 November 1992 at Northeim, when no TuHi was used, a new concept for rescue operations was introduced. Once the TuHi also became available for deployment away from the high-speed railway they became known as "emergency trains" (Rettungszüge or Rtz). All 13 engines of Class 214 were redesignated by the DB AG on 31 October 1994 to railway works vehicles of Class 714. Again the running numbers were retained. On 1 August 1996, however, they were given sequential numbers within Class 714, from 001 to 013. The locomotive with the lowest original number became 001 and the one with the highest became 013. Because only one reserve locomotive is available, DB AG converted another two engines in 1996/97 at Stendal: numbers 212 269 became 714 014 and 212 160 became 714 015. In addition to the renumbering, the TuHi/Rtz locos changed their livery. The first five TuHi locos still had the classic ocean blue and beige livery, the later eight engines were painted orient red. To achieve greater recognisability against the emergency wagon, the locos were painted in luminous red. Numbers 714 003, 714 008, 714 009, 714 011, 714 014 and 714 015 have this livery, as do the wagons in the Rtz at Würzburg, Fulda and Hildesheim. Due to the rapid fading of the luminous red paint, all engines and wagons were subsequently repainted in traffic red. The inscription on the locomotives remains confusing. There are the white letters Rtz, the DB insignia with white writing Netz Notfalltechnik, and the DB sign with white lettering Notfalltechnik. All 15 engines of Class 714 belong to DB Netz, central route management/railway vehicles at Fulda. From there the disposition of the engines is controlled and they are regularly changed over under a rolling programme.

== Use after 2004 ==
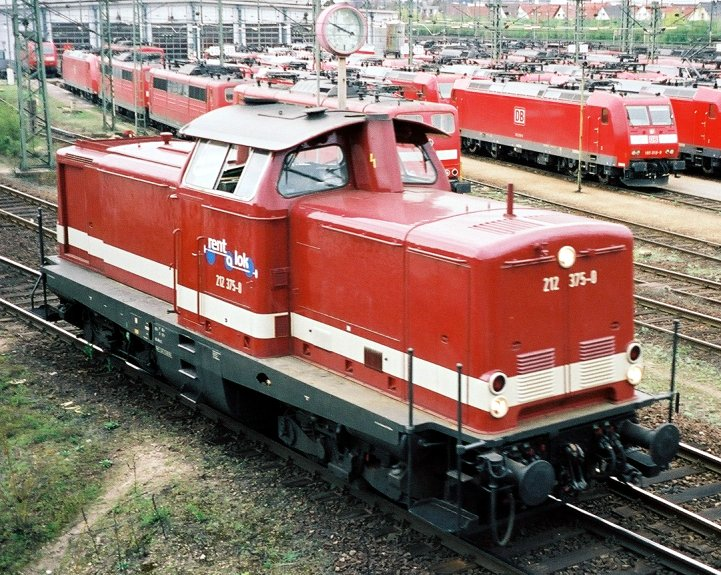
212 375 in April 2004 as a privately hired loco in Mannheim

With the withdrawal of the last Class 212 locomotives used by Railion on 13 December 2004 the employment of the V100 by the DB was largely over. Still in service, apart from the 15 tunnel rescue locos of Class 714, are just four engines of Classes 212 and 213 with the DB subsidiary, Deutsche Bahn Gleisbau (DBG), and one Class 213 engine with another subsidiary SüdostBayernBahn (mothballed in November 2006). However, in October 2006 12 retired 212s were transferred to Aw. Cottbus for a general inspection with the aim of reactivating them for DB Services. By the end of 2008 10 locomotives had been equipped with the MTU 8V 4000 R41 engine (1000 kW), which is similar to that on the Class 290/294.

Many locos from the Deutsche Bahns fleet were sold as part of a joint venture with Alstom to the Alstom Lokomotiven Service in Stendal. There the engines were systematically rebuilt and sold to interested parties, such as private railways, in Germany and abroad.

Some locomotives have found use with private operators, in particular rail infrastructure firms. (Note: Operators included H. F. Wiebe and EBW)

== Rebuilt locomotives ==
=== Class 214/262 ===
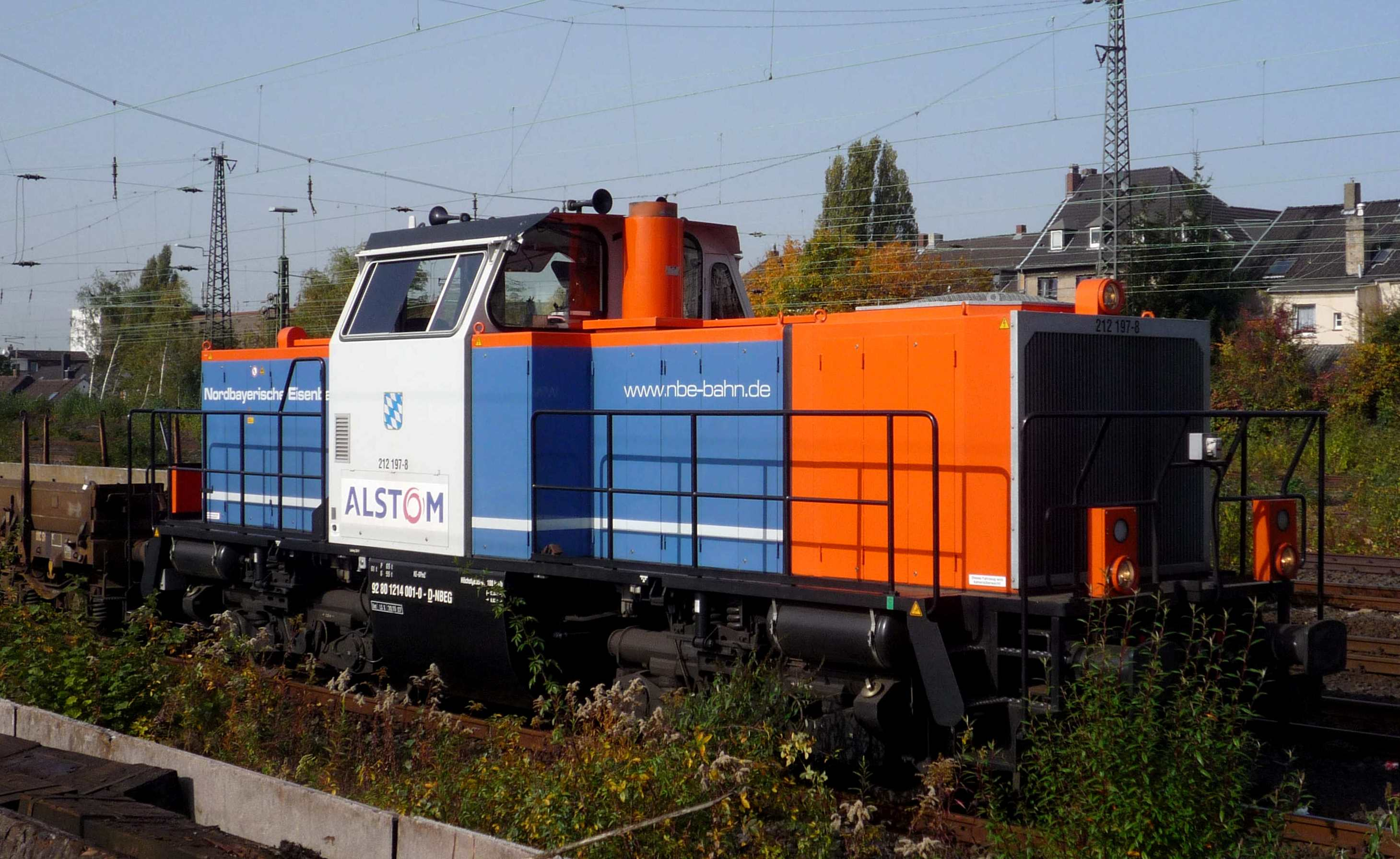
The NbE's 212 137-8

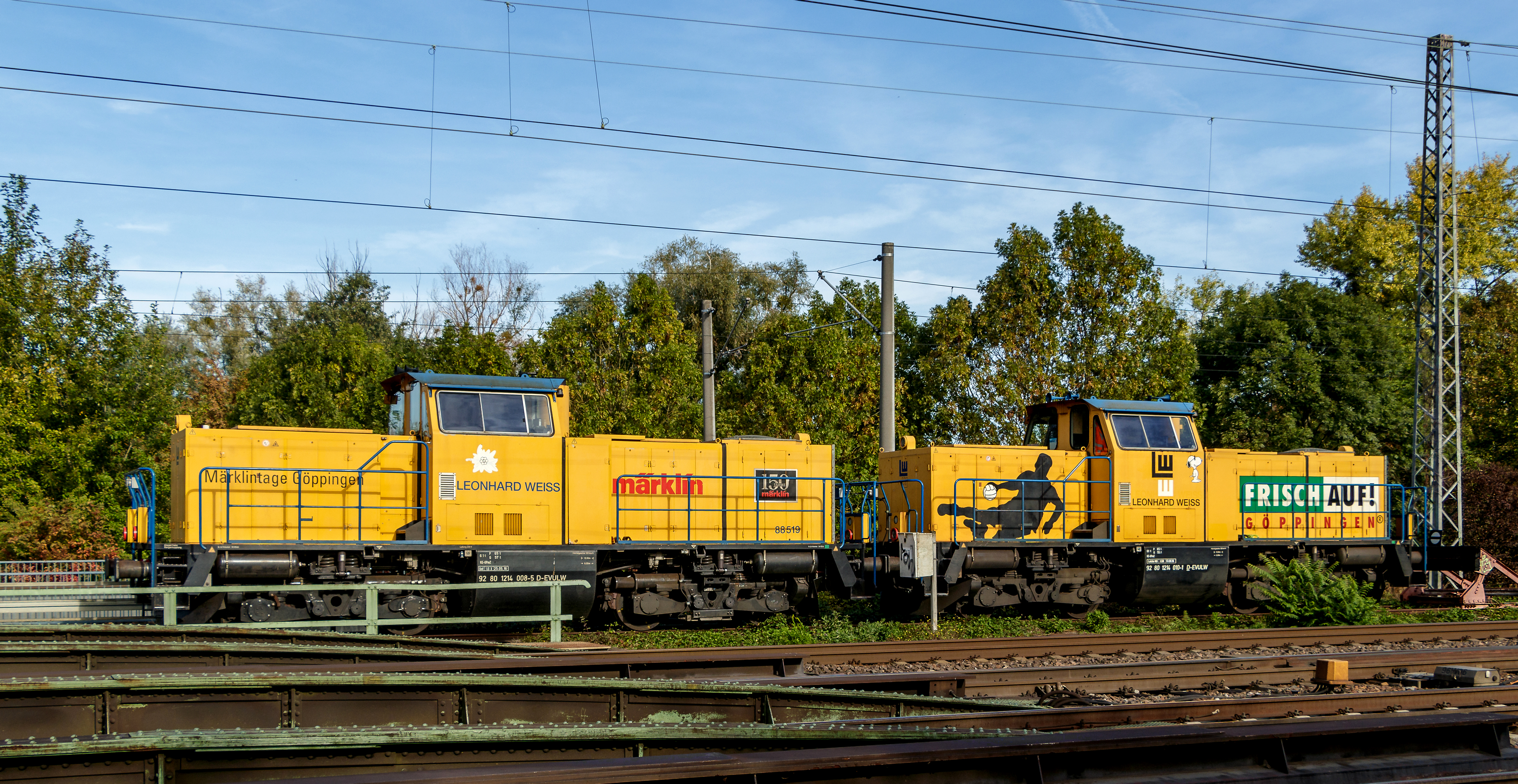
The 92 80 1214 008-5 D-EVULW, and the 92 80 1214 010-1 D-EVULW at the Station Karlsruhe-Durlach

In November 2006 Alstom and the Gmeinder Lokomotivfabrik Mosbach developed a modernisation concept for the locomotives of the former DB Class V 100. The prototype 214 110 was presented at the "Transport & Logistik München" in June 2007, numbered as 212 197 with the Nordbayerischen Eisenbahn (NBE). The classification was confirmed by the railway federal office in 20.05.2008, at the same time the Class 214 was specified in the EBA locomotive register. For the conversion only the locomotive frame and bogies of the V 100 were used. The low superstructure was completely new and more box like. The engines are driven by a new Caterpillar motor, 3508 BSC (970 kW). The DB classified the locos it hires out as Class 262. Eleven locomotives were delivered by August 2008 to, amongst others, DB Schenker, the Nordbayerische Eisenbahn, Locon and BBL Logistik. The DB Schenker locos were deployed to Magdeburg. In Stendal there are about 50 old vehicles available for a possible conversion.

=== OnRail DH 1004 ===
The OnRail DH 1004 were rebuilt from V 100s in the late 1990s and early 2000s by Vossloh retaining the frame, bogies and transmission but with the engine and bodywork replaced. The locomotives are used at ports and on private railways.

== Preservation ==
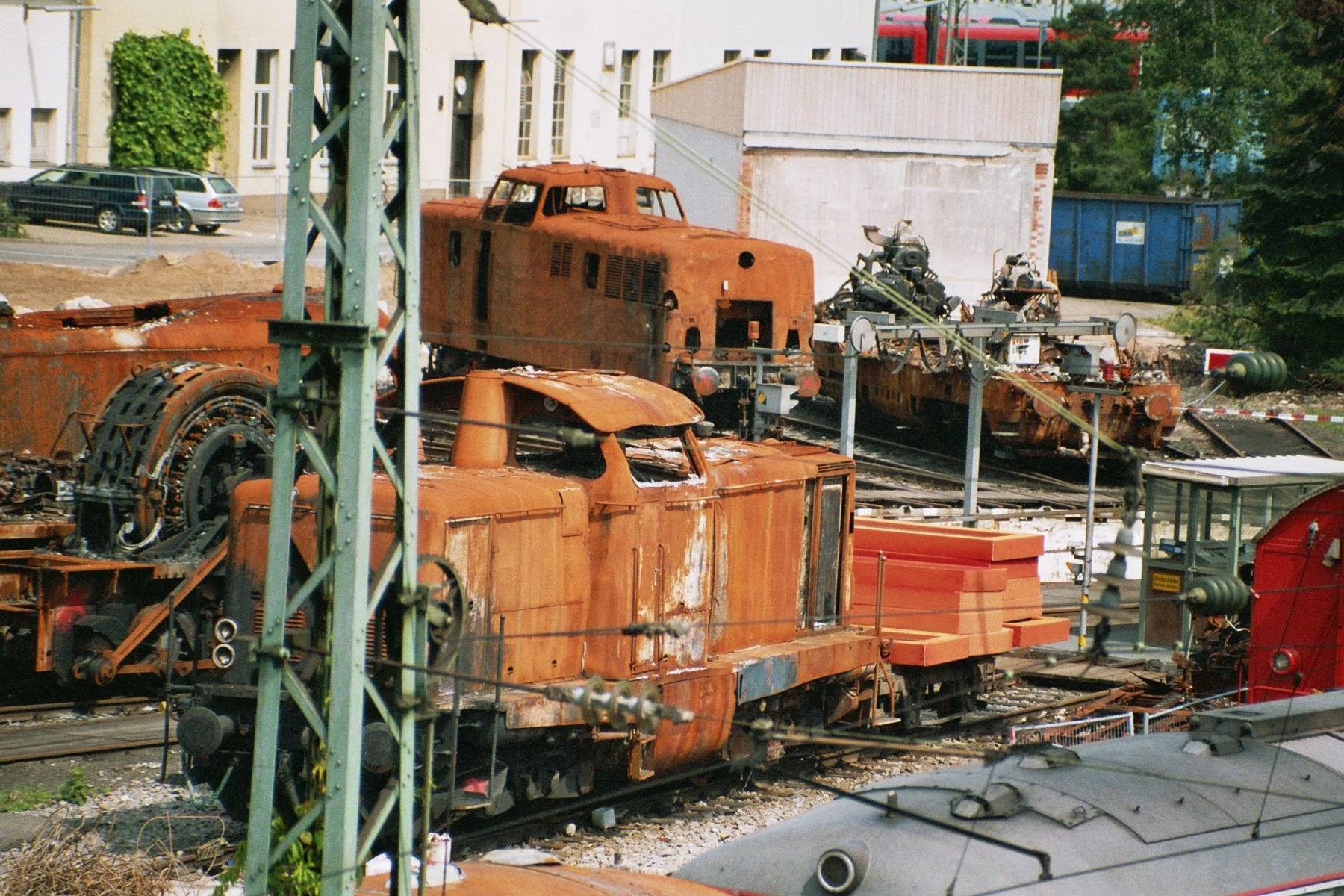
Remains of some of the burnt-out locos in the museum locomotive shed (class V 100 in the front, class V 80 in the background)

After withdrawal in 2004, 211 023, 212 023 and 212 330 in some units became the property of the Deutsche Bahn's own museum (see Nuremberg Transport Museum). One of the 212 units had been looked after by a group of railway fans for years; having been adopted in 1993 and painted in its historical purpurrot livery (Epoch III to Epoch IV (Note: The epoch system of dating is non-official, and was originally used by model railway companies to describe roughly the dates of operation, and liveries of the models they produced)) at the general inspections in 1994 and 2000.

All three locomotives were badly damaged as a result of a fire on 17 October 2005 at the museum. In June/July 2006 all the burnt out diesel locomotives in the museum's ownership were dismantled and scrapped.

An entire range of Class V100 locomotives have been preserved. For example: 211 023-7 (DB Museum), 211 054-2 (Gemeinde Eschenau), 211 079-9 (Hammer EF), 211 200-1 (DGEG), 211 357-9 (Gesellschaft zur Erhaltung von Schienenfahrzeugen), 212 001-2 (DB Museum), 212 007-9 (DGEG), 212 009-5 (private), 212 023-6 (DB Museum), 212 062-4 (DB Museum), 212 077-2 (DB Museum), 212 084-8 (DB Museum), 212 133-3 (private), 212 203-4 (private) und 212 372-7 (DB Museum).

== See also ==
- The Class 2048 of the OBB in Austria Modified Class 211s operating in Austria in the 1990s (German Wikipedia page)

== Further information ==
=== Books ===
- Große, Peter; Högemann, Josef (2005). Die Baureihe V 100. Freiburg: EK-Verlag. ISBN 3-88255-104-6.
- Burow, Andreas (2004). Die V 100-Familie. Munich: GeraNova Bruckmann. ISBN 3-7654-7109-7.
- von Lüpke, Alexander (2003). Museumslokomotive 212 203-4. Neustadt: Eisenbahnfachbuch-Verlag. ISBN 3-9807748-0-5.

=== Periodical articles ===
- Engbarth, Fritz (2000). "Abgelöst! Das Ende der V 100 in der Pfalz". Eisenbahn-Kurier. Vol. 34, no. 337. EK-Verlag GmbH. pp. 50–53. ISSN 0170-5288.
- Niedt, Marcus (2001). "Mädchen für alles. Die Baureihen 211–214 der Bundesbahn". LOK MAGAZIN. Vol. 40, no. 238. München: GeraNova Zeitschriftenverlag GmbH. pp. 69–79. ISSN 0458-1822.
- Feldmann, Thomas (2003). "Baureihe 212. Im Führerstand". LOK MAGAZIN. Vol. 42, no. 257. München: GeraNova Zeitschriftenverlag GmbH. pp. 52–55. ISSN 0458-1822.
- Burow, Andreas (2005). "Lok für steile Strecken. Die Baureihe 213". LOK MAGAZIN. Vol. 44, no. 280. München: GeraNova Zeitschriftenverlag GmbH. pp. 34–47. ISSN 0458-1822.
- Lorenz, Jürgen (2008). "Baureihe 214 jetzt mit Zulassung-weitere Lieferungen an LOCON und DB Schenker". Eisebahnkurier. No. 7. Freiburg: EK-Verlag. ISSN 0170-5288.

=== Film ===
- SWR: Eisenbahn-Romantik – Abschied von der V 100 (Folge 364)
