= Nahuel Pennisi =

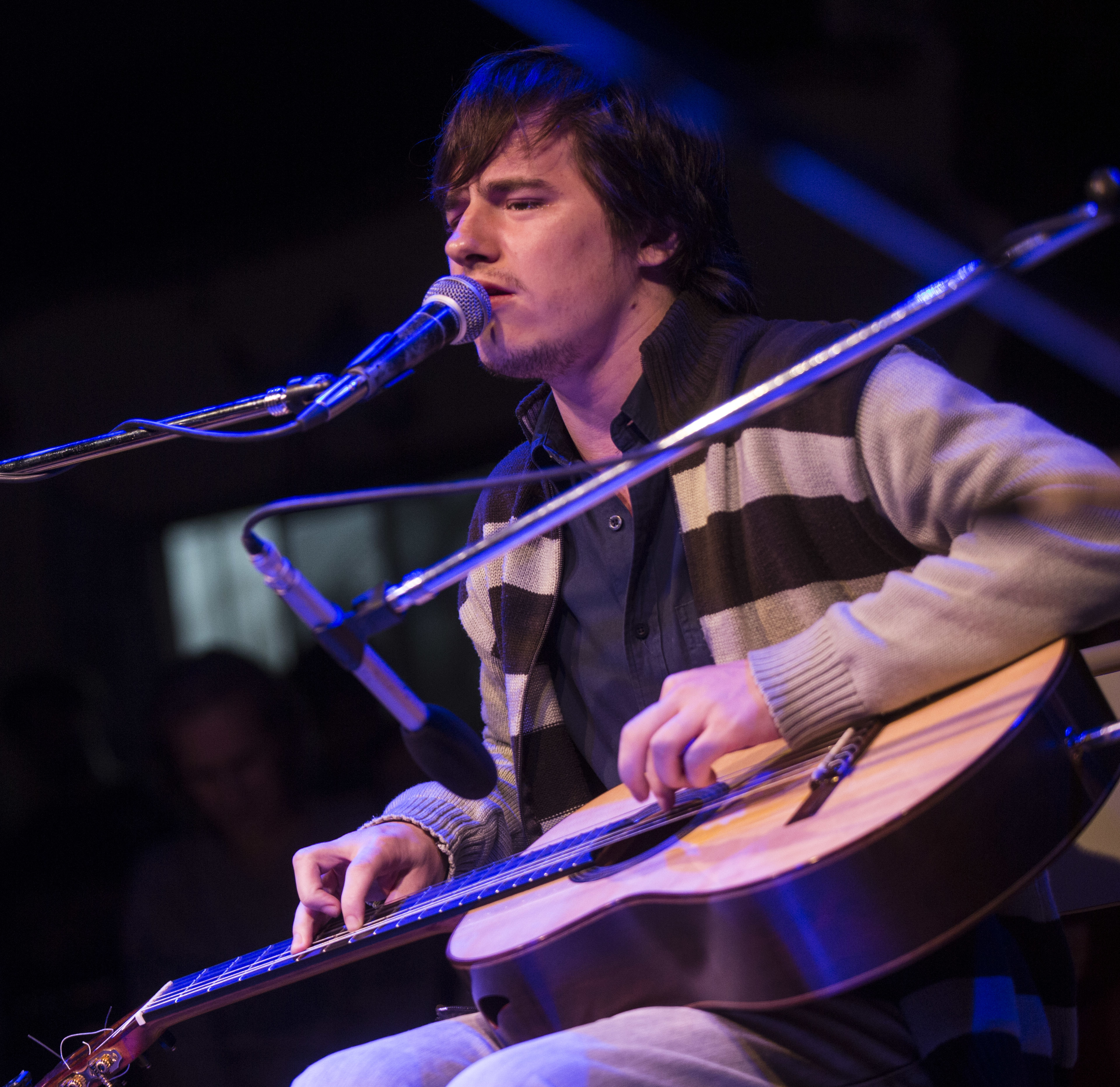

Background information
- Born: October 19, 1990 (age 35)
- Origin: Buenos Aires, Argentina
- Occupations: Performing musician, songwriter
- Years active: 2012–present
- Label: Sony Music

Nahuel Pennisi (born October 19, 1990) is an Argentine performing musician and songwriter. He has released three studio albums, won three Gardel Awards and received three Latin Grammy Award nominations.

== Early life ==
Pennisi was born in October 19, 1990, in Florencio Varela, Buenos Aires, Argentina. He is blind from birth and showed interest for music from an early age, he started to experiment with a keyboard at four years old, later teaching himself how to play the bass and guitar, forming a profound connection with the guitar being the instrument he usually plays in his music. At 16, while still being in high school, he started to play in the streets of Buenos Aires becoming a full-time musician after finishing high school.

== Career ==
In 2009, he participated for the first time at the Cosquín Festival, a folk music festival where he met the guitarist Luis Salinas who invited him to perform as a guest for one of his shows. In 2012, he released the album El Sueño de la Canción independently which included collaborations with musicians such as Luis Salinas, Teresa Parodi, Chango Spasiuk and Popi Spatocco. On December 11, 2015, he released his debut studio album titled Primavera through Sony Music, the record was produced by Popi Spatocco and Matías Zapata and featured collaborations with artists like Franco Luciani, Hernán Langer and Teresa Parodi. The album also includes cover versions of the songs "El Necio" by Silvio Rodríguez and "Oración del Remanso" by Jorge Fandermole. For the project, he won the Gardel Award for Best New Folklore Artist and received a nomination for Best Folk Album at the 17th Annual Latin Grammy Awards, both in 2016.

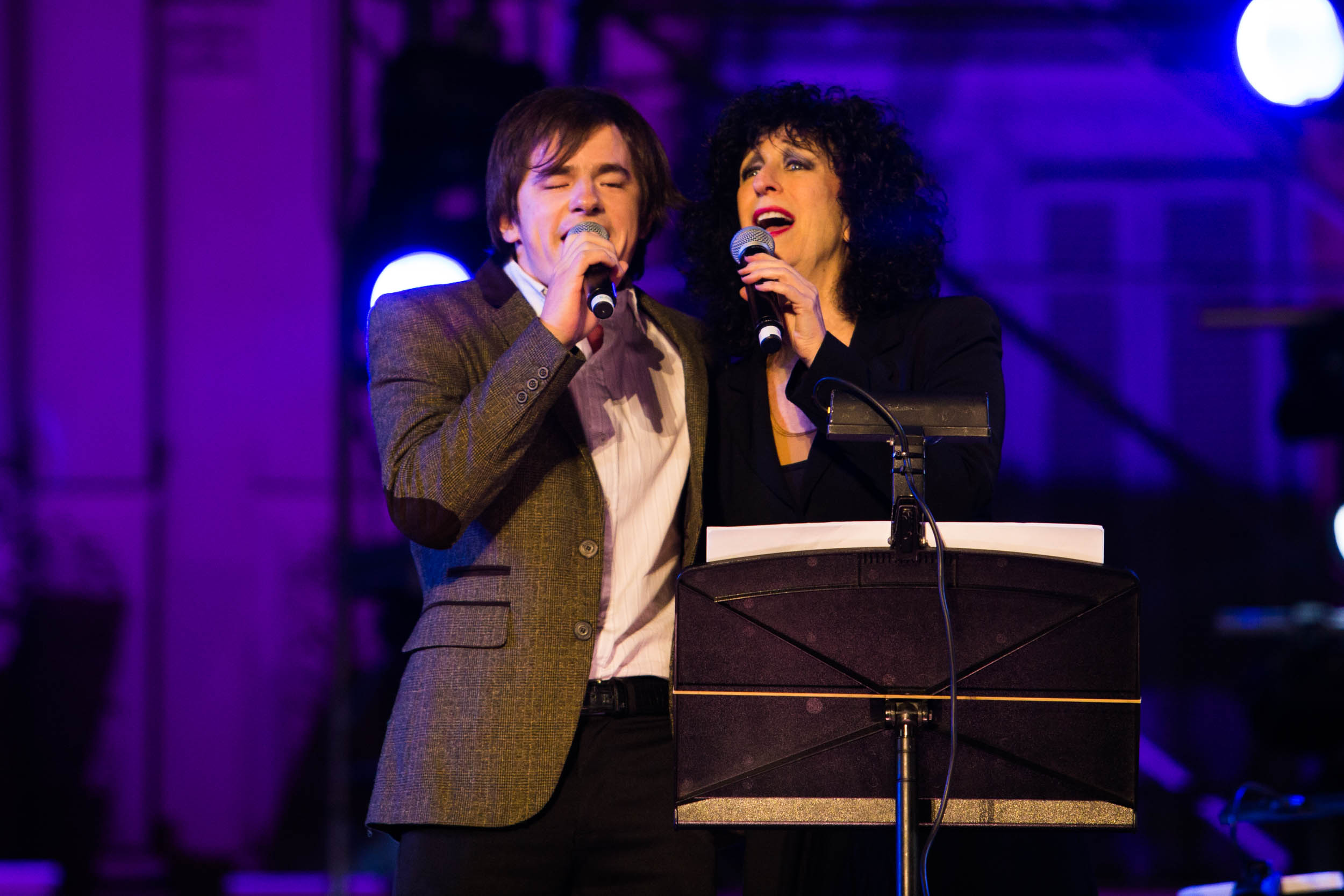
Pennisi performing with Julia Zenko.

On August 11, 2017, he released Feliz, his second studio album through Sony Music, the album consists of fourteen songs produced by Pablo Durand and composed by Pennisi and León Cuyé, it also includes a collaboration with flamenco singer Niña Pastori, the project was recorded in live sessions with musicians such as guitarists Dean Parks and Ramón Stagnaro, bassist Jimmy Johnson, percussionist Alex Acuña and drummer Aaron Sterling. Thanks to the album, he won his second Gardel Award, this time for Best Instrumental/Fusion/World Music Album, and received a nomination for Best Traditional Pop Vocal Album at the 19th Annual Latin Grammy Awards.

At the Viña del Mar International Song Festival 2020, Pennisi participated in the folkloric competition with the song "Avanzar" representing Argentina, after receiving scores of 6,5 and 6,8 in the first two rounds, he won the first place in the competition with an average score of 6,8 and also won the award for Best Performer of that competition, both selected by a jury. Also in 2020, he was featured in the song "Lo Que Yo en Ti Veo" from Mesa Para Dos, the seventh album by Puerto Rican singer Kany García, the song was nominated for Record of the Year at the 21st Annual Latin Grammy Awards.

After releasing the singles "Compañera", "Volver", "Universo Paralelo" and the collaborations "Mundo" with Abel Pintos and "Viaje al pasado" with Mila Manes during 2020, Pennisi released his third studio album on December 4, 2020, titled Renacer. The album consisted of thirteen songs, mostly produced by Julio Reyes Copello, both original and cover versions of songs from other artists like "Hoy", written by Gian Marco and performed by Gloria Estefan and "Hasta Que Me Olvides", written by Juan Luis Guerra and performed by Luis Miguel. The album won Best Alternative Folklore Album at the 23rd Annual Gardel Awards.

== Discography ==
- Primavera (2015)
- Feliz (2017)
- Renacer (2020)

== Awards and nominations ==
=== Gardel Awards ===
Year	Category	Nominated work	Result	Ref.
2016	Best New Folklore Artist	Primavera	Won	
2018	Best Instrumental/Fusion/World Music Album	Feliz	Won	
2020	Best Collaboration	"Todavía" (with Kapanga)	Nominated	
2021	Best Alternative Folklore Album	Renacer	Won	

=== Latin Grammy Awards ===
Year	Category	Nominated work	Result	Ref.
2016	Best Folk Album	Primavera	Nominated	
2018	Best Traditional Pop Vocal Album	Feliz	Nominated	
2020	Record of the Year	"Lo Que Yo en Ti Veo" (with Kany García)	Nominated	

Note: At the 19th Annual Latin Grammy Awards, Gustavo Borner, Justin Moshkevich and Nick Baxter received a nomination for Best Engineered Album as engineers of Feliz.
