= Josefa Sánchez de González =

Member of the Chamber of Deputies
- In office 1942–
- Constituency: Santiago

Josefa Sánchez de González was a Dominican Republic teacher and politician. In 1942 she was elected to the Chamber of Deputies, becoming one of the first group of Dominican Congresswomen.

== Biography ==
A teacher by profession, Sánchez de González was a candidate in Santiago Province the 1942 general elections, the first after women were granted the right to vote. With the Dominican Party of president Rafael Trujillo being the sole legal party, she was elected unopposed and became one of the first three women in the Congress. The following year, she served as General Secretary of the first Dominican Women's Congress. In 1945 she was appointed director of the women's section of the Dominican Party.
