= EBW (rail company) =

Rail industry company

Eisenbahn-Bewachungs GmbH
- Company type: Rail industry -
- Industry: Rail
- Founded: 1979
- Fate: Insolvent as of January 2010
- Headquarters: Dachau, Germany
- Key people: Managing Director : Wolfgang Rutkowske
- Services: Rail infrastructure, rail freight, others
- Website: http://www.ebw-online.com/main.html

The EBW group was a rail industry company consisting of several individual companies. It was declared insolvent in January 2010.

== Group ==
The group's primary business was rail infrastructure and maintenance. The company also specialised in rail safety aspects of infrastructural work, specifically in terms of non-railway based workers performing construction tasks near or on main lines.

=== EBW Eisenbahn-bewachungs GmbH ===
EBW Eisenbahn-bewachungs was the main branch of the company, undertaking both financing and the rail freight operations of the group.

The freight operating company known as EBW cargo was headquartered in Würzburg, and focused on infrastructure trains, as well as leasing EBW owned locomotives and rolling stock (wagons), and organising and managing rail head fed site logistics.

=== IFE ===
IFE (Ingenieursleistungen für Eisenbahnen GmbH translation :"Engineering services for railways limited") was an engineering firm - specialising in railway construction including catenary.

=== IAS ===
IAS GmbH was a maintenance company, providing services such as trackside vegetation management as well as landscape gardening.

=== VE-log ===
VE-log GmbH employed approximately 60 people in the areas of land management, bulk materials and transportation, including recycling. Road transportation logistics is also performed by this company.

== Rolling stock ==
=== Locomotives ===
EBW operated a number of rebuilt, former Deutsche Bahn locomotives.

- The three V270 class are rebuilt DB Class 221 locomotives. The locomotives are each either two Deutz TBD 620 V12 engines or two MTU 12V 4000 engines R 41 R both of ~1,500 hp (1,100 kW) each. Total ~3,000 hp (2,200 kW).
- Two V232/V230 (former DR Class 130 family locomotives) of ~ 2,200 kW (3,000 hp) power, used for transportation of track laying machines as well as ballast and sleepers for railway track construction.
- 10 remotorised DB Class V 100s, (company names V100, V130, V150) with installed power of between 1,000 hp (750 kW) and 1,500 hp (1,100 kW), forming the main part of EBW's locomotive fleet for transfer of construction materials to and from site
- 3 DB Class V 60's (company name V60) for shunting work.

=== Wagons ===
The company holds and operates its own wagons - typically those designed for construction solids (with a typical capacity of ~40m^{3}); designs suitable for moisture sensitive solids, conveyor belt and other controlled discharge methods are kept.

== See also ==
- List of German railway companies
