= Lyudmila Stanukinas =

Soviet documentary filmmaker (1930–2020)

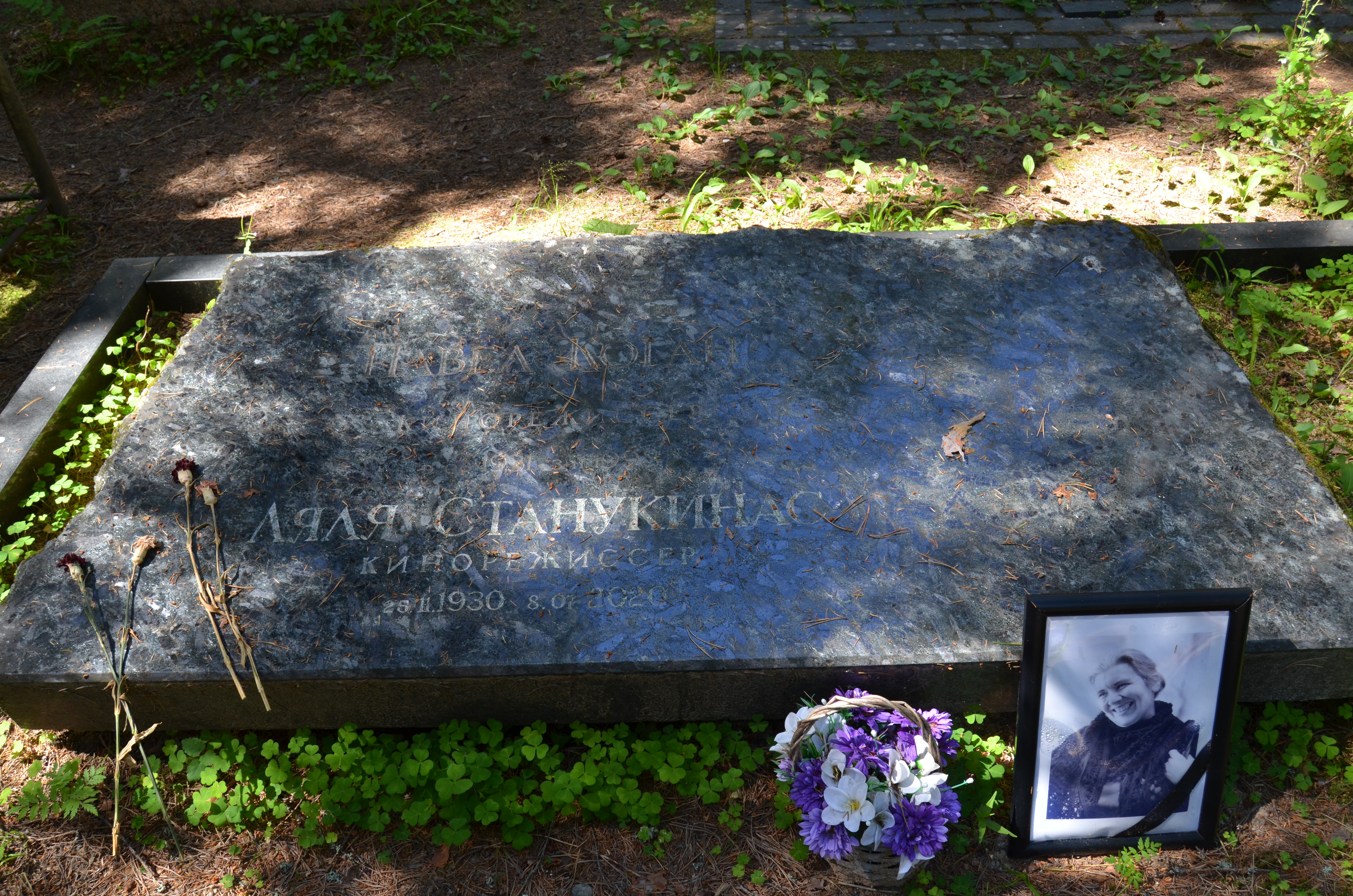
- Born: Lyudmila Igorevna Stanukinas; 25 November 1930; Alma-Ata, Kazakh SSR, Soviet Union (now Kazakhstan)
- Died: 8 July 2020 (aged 89); Jerusalem, Israel
- Occupation: Documentary filmmaker

Lyudmila Igorevna Stanukinas (Russian: Людмила Игоревна Станукинас; 25 November 1930 – 8 July 2020) was a Soviet documentary filmmaker. She was an Honored Artist of the RSFSR (1989). She was member of the Union of Cinematographers of the USSR. Stanukinas died on 8 July 2020 in Israel.

Having previously worked for the company "Lenfilm" in the 1950's, Stanukinas had first gone to a film university, but instead graduated from the Leningrad Institute of Foreign Languages with a degree in English. Despite this, her focus remained on film and she joined the Leningrad Documentary Film Studio in 1958. Among her students is Victor Kossakovsky.
