= Isabel Mayer =

Isabel Mayer (1885-1961) was a Dominican feminist, politician and socialite from the province of Monte Cristi in the Northwest of the Dominican Republic. She was a member of the feminist group Acción Feminista Dominicana (AFD) that helped secure suffrage for women in the Dominican Republic in 1942 under dictator Rafael Trujillo. She served as a senator from her home province from 1942-1944 and also as governor of both Monte Cristi and Santiago. A number of foreign journalists referred to her as a celestina, or madam, for Trujillo during the regime.

== Early life ==
Isabel Mayer was born on February 7, 1885, to a wealthy land-owning family in the Monte Cristi province of the Dominican Republic. Her parents were Emilio Mayer and Virginia Rodríguez. She attended Welgelegen School in Curaçao. In 1909 she was crowned the queen of carnival in Monte Cristi. She married Manuel Tavárez Ramos and had one child, Carmen Isabel Tavárez Mayer, in the early 1910s but soon divorced and never remarried. In the 1920s Mayer became very involved with the incipient feminist movement, becoming the President of the local "Club de Damas." By the 1930s she was involved in the national movement for women's rights as a founding member of Dominican Feminist Action (AFD) and active participant in the collective's gatherings and events. She had also become very close with Rafael Trujillo, the leader who would become dictator from 1930 - 1961 through her prominent social connections in the northwest province of her birth.

== Political career ==
After Rafael Trujillo moved to grant women the vote in 1942, he designated Mayer one of the first senators for her provincial home of Monte Cristi. She would later serve as the governor of Monte Cristi province and neighboring (and more politically significant) Santiago de los Caballeros. In the late 1940s she became head of the "Dominicanization of the Border" committee and she worked exhaustively through the next decade to demonstrate her loyalty to the dictator and his party, the Partido Dominicano (Dominican Party, or Trujillo's main party).

== Conflict with Rafael Trujillo ==
In 1960 Mayer fell into disfavor with the Trujillo regime as a result of her extended family's resistance activities. Manolo Tavárez Justo, the son of her ex-husband, had become a key leader in the resistance activism against the dictator. As was a standard tactic of the regime, Mayer found her name on a list of individuals "invited" to form their own party due to their apparent dissatisfaction with the reigning Partido Dominicano. Mayer responded indignantly that she had no interest in joining any new political collective and would remain, until she died, a loyal follower of the "enlightened" policies of dictator Rafael Trujillo. She was written up in an infamous section ("El Foro Público") of the nation's main newspaper, El Caribe, as a detractor, and even briefly jailed. Despite her denials, she was fired from her political post and became persona non grata to the regime.

== Death and legacy ==
Mayer died in 1961 in Monte Cristi not long after falling from favor in the regime's eyes. Her legacy as a pioneering feminist and early female politician has been largely overshadowed by the many foreign journalist reports that she was a celestina, or madam, for the dictator. As a result of foreign reporters being led to her house in their travels across the country, she was described in multiple English publications variously as a madam, wheel-horse, adventuress, harridan, octaroon, and celestina. The label of celestina, or procuress, has been the most long-lasting and is included in many, if not all, Dominican publications that mention her role in the dictatorship.
