= Ludmila Prokunina-Olsson =

Russian medical geneticist

- Education: Moscow State University; Uppsala University Faculty of Medicine
- Scientific career
- Fields: Medical genetics, translational genomics
- Workplaces: National Institutes of Health
- Thesis: Strategies for identification of susceptibility genes in complex autoimmune diseases (2004)
- Doctoral advisor: Marta Alarcon-Riquelme

Ludmila Prokunina-Olsson is a molecular medical geneticist who conducts genetic and functional analyses downstream of genome-wide association studies (GWAS) for various human traits, including cancer, immune and infectious diseases. She is chief of the Laboratory of Translational Genomics (LTG) at the National Cancer Institute.

== Life ==
Prokunina-Olsson received an M.Sc. in molecular genetics from Moscow State University. She earned a Ph.D. in medical genetics from Uppsala University Faculty of Medicine in 2004. Her dissertation was titled Strategies for identification of susceptibility genes in complex autoimmune diseases. Marta Alarcon-Riquelme was her doctoral advisor and Juha Kere was an opponent of her dissertation.

During 2005 to 2008, she was a visiting fellow with Francis Collins in the genome technology branch of the National Human Genome Research Institute. Prokunina-Olsson joined the Laboratory of Translational Genomics (LTG) of the division of Cancer Epidemiology and Genetics (DCEG) as a research fellow in June 2008. She became a tenure-track investigator in April 2010 and was awarded National Institutes of Health (NIH) scientific tenure and promoted to senior investigator in December 2014. She became acting chief of LTG in February 2018 and was appointed as chief in December 2018. Prokunina-Olsson explores the connections between the genome-wide association studies (GWAS)-identified genetic susceptibility variants and molecular phenotypes of importance for cancer. Some of her findings have resulted in translational and clinical applications. Prokunina-Olsson is also involved in research regarding bladder cancer and how somatic mutagenesis in bladder tumors is regulated by both inheritance and environmental factors.
