= Mila Manes =

- Born: Quilmes, Argentina
- Genres: pop; reggaeton
- Occupations: singer; songwriter
- Years active: 2020–present
- Labels: ADB Records

Mila Manes, also known as MILA, is an Argentine singer and songwriter, best known for her single "No me haces falta", selected to compete at the Viña del Mar International Song Festival in 2023. In 2021 she released El sueño de Mila, her first studio album.

== Biography ==
=== Beginnings and debut album ===
Born in Quilmes, Buenos Aires, in her adolescence she decided to become a professional singer. She began her musical career in 2020 with the release of four singles between August and December. "Agua", the first of them, achieved radio broadcasting and was presented on television channels in her country. A month later, she released "De a poquito", a single accompanied by a videoclip featuring actor Federico Bal. In November she released "Tu perdición" with its corresponding video, followed by "Viaje al pasado", a duet with the musician and composer Nahuel Pennisi.

In mid-2021 she released her debut album, titled El sueño de Mila and recorded in streaming from the Teatro Ópera in Buenos Aires. At the end of the same year she toured as a supporting artist of the music duo MYA, with which she toured fourteen cities in her native country. On December 15 he presented his debut album at Teatro La Trastienda.

=== "No me haces falta", Viña del Mar and present day ===
After participating in several music festivals (like the Fiesta Nacional del Inmigrante in Obrerá or the Fiesta Nacional de la Primavera in Cañuelas), in October 2022 she released the single "No me haces falta", with the collaboration of singer and producer Estani. According to Billboard magazine, Manes "took a leap in her career" with the release of the song.

After sharing the stage with L-Gante in November of the same year at the National and International Yerba Mate Festival in Apóstoles, a month later several media announced that Manes would represent her country at the Viña del Mar International Song Festival with the song "No me haces falta". The event will be held between February 19 and 24, 2023.

== Discography ==
=== Studio albums ===
Year	Title	Notes
2021	El sueño de Mila	ADB Records

=== Singles ===
Year	Title	Notes
2020	"Agua"	
2020	"De a poquito"	
2020	"Tu perdición"	
2020	"Viaje al pasado"	Ft. Nahuel Pennisi
2021	"Olvídate"	Ft. Sol Makena
2022	"No me haces falta"	
