= Milagros (given name) =

Milagros is a Spanish feminine given name. Notable people with the surname include:

- Milagros Cabral (born 1978), Dominican volleyball player
- Milagros Cerrón (born 2004), Peruvian sirenomelia survivor
- Milagros Crespo (born 1979), Cuban beach volleyball player
- Milagros Flores (born 1990), Argentine actress
- Milagros Hernando (1957–2017), Spanish diplomat
- Milagros D. Ibe, Filipino academic, teacher and educator
- Milagros Moy (born 1975), Peruvian volleyball player
- Milagros Paz (born 1962), Venezuelan journalist and politician
- Ana Milagros Parra, Venezuelan political scientist
