= Ana Milagros Parra =

Venezuelan political scientist

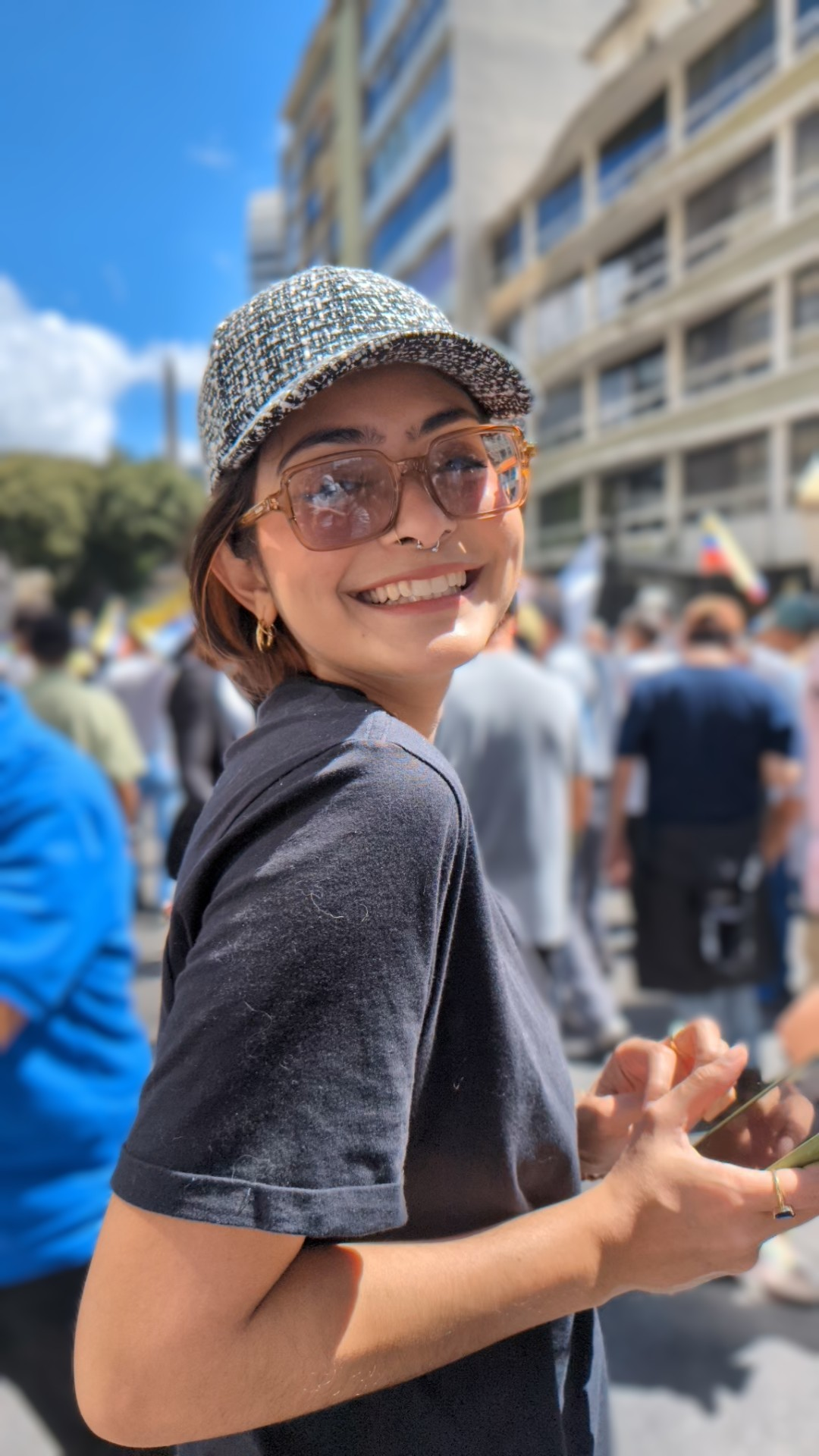
- Born: 4 February 1997 (age 29)
- Occupation: Political scientist

Ana Milagros Parra (4 February 1997) is a Venezuelan political scientist. She has worked both as a researcher and interviewer in human rights organizations, later specializing in political risk analysis. Ana Milagros obtained her degree in political science at Rafael Urdaneta University and has been head of political analysis in the strategic risk analysis department at IURISCORP, a corporate legal consulting firm. She has been quoted in media such as El Mundo, elDiario.es, El Pitazo, Runrunes, Caraota Digital, Newsy, and Diario de Cuba, among others.

On November 5, 2019 she headed the conference "International Sanctions: Assertive Recommendations to the Entrepreneur's Environment", held at Impact Hub Caracas, together with Rafael Álvarez Loscher. On January 24, 2020 she led the conference "2020: The year of evolution of business models in hostile scenarios" at the offices of IURISCORP, again with Loscher.
