= Milada (name) =

- Gender: female

Origin
- Origin: Slavic
- Meaning: mil ("love, favour, gracious")

Other names
- Nicknames: Mila, Miladka
- Related names: Milady, Milena (name), Miloslava

Milada is a female given name. Diminutive of Slavic names beginning with the element mil meaning gracious, young. Pronounced MI-lah-dah.

== Name Days ==
- Czech: 8 February
- Slovak: 29 December
- Slovene: 28 March

== Famous bearers ==
- Milada Horáková, Czechoslovak politician, executed after a show-trial in 1950
- Milada Marešová, Czech painter
- Milada Fišerová, Czech model
- Milada Ježková, Czech actress
- Milada Karasová, holder of Czechoslovak Models
- Milada Emmerová, Czech doctor and politician ČSSD
- Milada Gabrielová, Czech painter
- Milada Součková, Czech writer
- Milada Šubrtová, Czech opera singer
- Milada Karbanová, Czech athlete
- Miłada Jędrysik, Polish journalist

== See also ==
- Mila (given name)
- Milan (given name)
- Milena (name)
- Miloslav
