= Mila Nikolova =

Bulgarian applied mathematician

Mila Nikolova (1962 – 20 June 2018) was a Bulgarian applied mathematician, known for her research in image processing, inverse problems, and compressed sensing.

== Education and career ==
After working as a science journalist and engineer in Bulgaria, Nikolova completed a Ph.D. in 1995 in signal and image processing at the University of Paris-Sud. In 2006, she earned a habilitation in mathematics at Pierre and Marie Curie University.

She did postdoctoral research with Électricité de France, and then joined the faculty at Paris Descartes University in 1996. In 1999 she was given a position as senior research fellow at CNRS, associated at first with the École nationale supérieure des télécommunications and since 2003 with the École normale supérieure Cachan. She became a director of research at CNRS in 2009.

== Recognition ==
Nikolova won the Michel-Monpetit Prize of the French Academy of Sciences in 2010, "for the originality and depth of her research in mathematical image processing and in solving certain inverse problems".

The Journal of Mathematical Imaging and Vision has published a posthumous special issue in honor of Nikolova.
