= Mile V. Pajić =

Serbian visual artist and cultural activist (born 1958)

Mile V. Pajić Миле В. Пајић
- Born: 1958 (age 66–67); Šabac, Serbia, Yugoslavia
- Notable work: Treasury of Serbian Spirituality
- Style: Visual

Mile V. Pajić (Serbian: Миле В. Пајић; born 1958) is a Serbian visual artist, cultural activist, and independent researcher. He is the author of several monographs on Serbia’s cultural and ecclesiastical heritage. Pajić is also active in publishing and is affiliated with a number of Serbian cultural institutions, including the non-governmental organization and publishing house Riznica srpske duhovnosti (Treasure of Serbian Spirituality), based in Belgrade.

Pajić previously served as vice-president for culture of the Dositej Obradović Endowment.

== Career ==
=== Artistic work ===
Pajić's work is featured in the Russian monograph Russian-Serbian Painting, published in 2014.

=== Cultural work ===
Pajić's cultural activities focus on the study and presentation of Serbian cultural heritage, with an emphasis on medieval aesthetics, particularly those of Byzantine influence. Pajić's research inspired the Treasury of Serbian Spirituality project in the mid-1990s, which aimed at presenting Serbian heritage within the context of spiritual, cultural, and state-building history. Moreover, Pajić was among the founders of the eponymous non-governmental organization and publishing house, where he also served as editor-in-chief.

== Exhibitions ==
=== Solo ===
- Hilandar Monastery, Serbian Imperial Lavra ('Sveti manastir Hilandar, srpska carska lavra'), St. Nikolaj Srpski, 2004; Šabac, 2005; Obrenovac, 2005; Ministry of Diaspora, Belgrade, 2005; Institute for the Study of Cultural Development of Serbia, Belgrade, 2014.
- Shrines of the Serbian People ('Svetinje srpskog naroda'), Belgrade International Book Fair, Belgrade, 2009.
- Watercolor Belgrade ('Beograd u akvarelu'), Đura Jakšić House, Belgrade, 2016.
- Belgrade, An Utopian City ('Beograd, utopijski grad'), Institute for the Study of Cultural Development of Serbia, Belgrade, 2016.

=== Group ===
- Gallery 73, Belgrade, 2012.
- Ikar Gallery at the Air Force Cultural Center, Zemun, 2013.
- Institute for the Study of Cultural Development, Belgrade, 2013.
- Đura Jakšić House Gallery, Belgrade, 2013.
- Student Cultural Center, New Belgrade, Gallery 73, Belgrade, as part of the thematic exhibition "1700 Years of the Edict of Milan" within the Belgrade–Požarevac–Trstenik–Niš tour, 2013.

== Book illustrations ==
- "Treasury of Serbian Spirituality" ('Riznica srpske duhovnosti') in six monographs, by Mile V. Pajić.
- "The Road to Light" ('Put u svetlost'), a poem by Hadži Peter Solar.

== Monographs (texts and paintings) ==
- Hilandar Monastery, Serbian Imperial Lavra ('Sveti manastir Hilandar, srpska carska lavra'), Riznica srpske duhovnosti, Belgrade, 2005, 2009; editions in Serbian, Russian, English, and German, Riznica srpske duhovnosti and Službeni glasnik, Belgrade, 2015.
- The shrines of old Raška, Nemanjides endowment ('Svetinje stare Raške, zadužbine Nemanjića'), Riznica srpske duhovnosti, Belgrade, 2009.
- The Shrines of Medieval Serbia, The Legacy of the Christian Orient ('Svetinje srednjovekovne Srbije, nasleđe hrišćanskog Orijenta'), Riznica srpske duhovnosti, Belgrade, 2009.
- Shrines of Moravian Serbia, Treasuries of Nemanjides Legacies ('Svetinje moravske Srbije, riznice zaveštanja Nemanjića'), Riznica srpske duhovnosti, Belgrade, 2009.
- Shrines of the Serbian People, monasteries at the Intersection of East and West ('Svetinje srpskog naroda, manastiri na razmeđu Istoka i Zapada'), Riznica srpske duhovnosti, Belgrade, 2009.
- Shrines of restored Serbia, Saint Savva's spirituality for the future of the Serbian people ('Svetinje obnovljene Srbije, svetosavlje za budućnost srpskog naroda'), Riznica srpske duhovnosti, Belgrade, 2009.

== Essays ==
- Slavic plein-air: one trip to the East, Belgorod art travelogue ('Slavjanski plener: jedno putovanje na Istok'), Rastko Project, 2018.
- From fresco to comic book ('Od freske do stripa'), Kultura, scientific journal for the theory and sociology of culture and cultural policy, Belgrade, No. 165/2019. Within the international collection "Comics and Identity" ("Strip i identitet")
- Gorostas ('A giant'), an essay, Rastko Project, 2019.
- In memoriam: Zoran Mihajlović (1955–2019), Rastko Project, 2019.
