= Milady Félix de L'Official =

Dominican lawyer, writer, politician, diplomat (1906–2001)

Member of the Chamber of Deputies
- In office 1942–1952

Member of the Senate
- In office 1952–
- Constituency: Azua

Personal details
- Born: 1906 Azua, Dominican Republic
- Died: 2001 (aged 94–95)

Milady Félix de L'Official (1906–2001) was a Dominican Republic lawyer, writer, politician and diplomat. In 1942 she was elected to the Chamber of Deputies, becoming one of the first group of Dominican Congresswomen.

== Biography ==
L'Official was born Milady Félix Miranda in Azua in 1906, the daughter of Altagracia Miranda and Francisco Félix Matos. She attended school in Azua until the age of ten, when her parents moved to San Pedro de Macorís. When she was 16, her family relocated to Santo Domingo, where she attended the Escuela Normal Superior.

She graduated from the Universidad Autónoma de Santo Domingo with a law degree in 1932. She subsequently worked as a judicial advisor for San Rafael, the national insurance company, and founded the National Federation of Lawyers.

A bar member, she was a candidate in the 1942 general elections, the first after women were granted the right to vote. With the Dominican Party of president Rafael Trujillo being the sole legal party, she was elected unopposed and became one of the first three women in the Congress. She became secretary of the Chamber. In 1952 she was elected to the smaller and more prestigious Senate, representing Azua.

After leaving politics, she was appointed vice consul in New York City in 1961. She died in 2001.
