= Liudmyla Horova =

Ukrainian poet and writer

- Людмила Горова
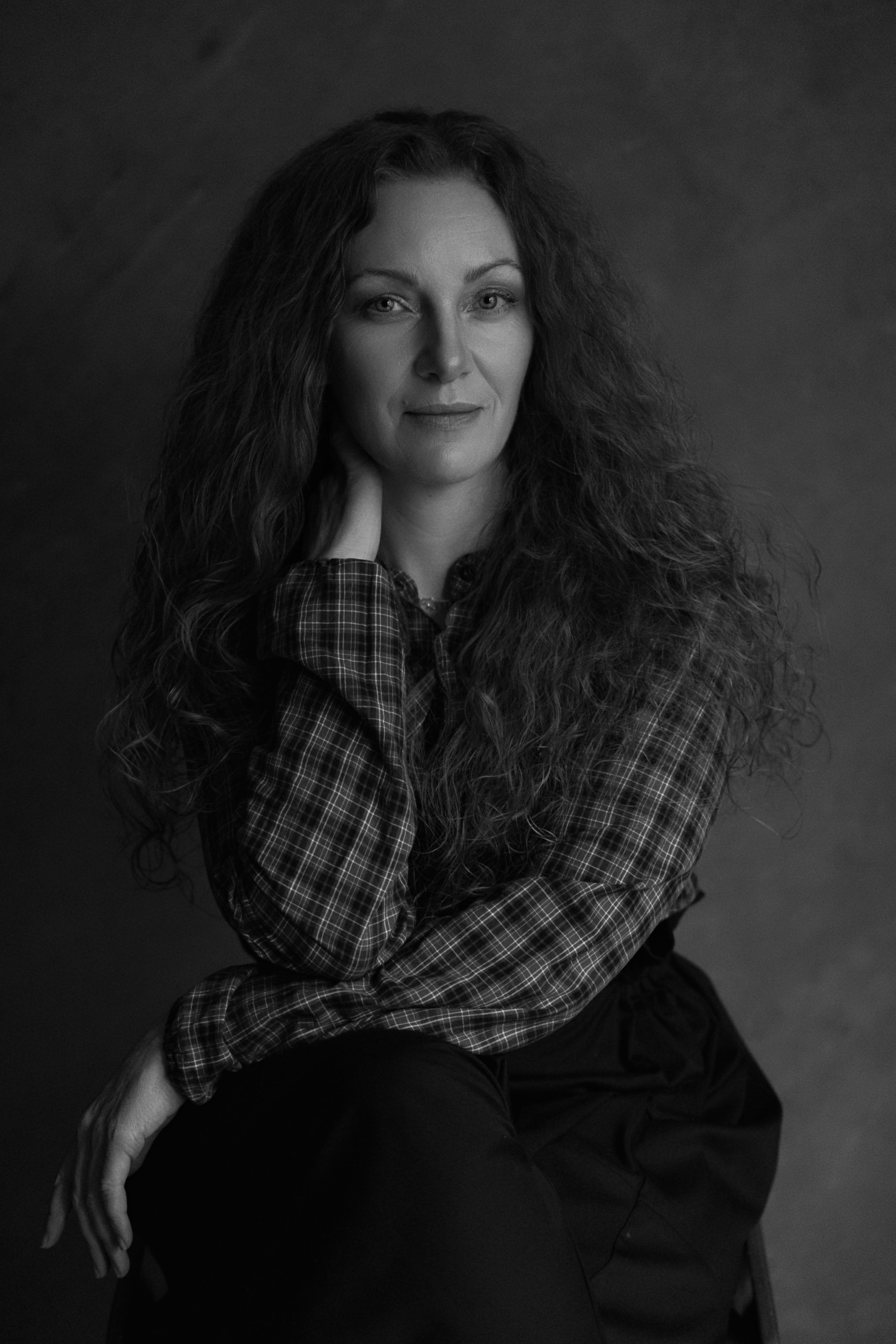
- Born: Liudmyla Volodymyrivna Horova; 15 September 1975 (age 50); Vorobiivka, Khmelnytskyi Oblast
- Education: Vinnytsia National Medical University. N. I. Pirogov

Liudmyla Volodymyrivna Horova (Ukrainian: Людмила Володимирівна Горова, born 15 September 1975, Vorobiivka, Khmelnytskyi Oblast) is a Ukrainian poet and writer. She is the author of the poems "Vrazhe", "Divchata divchatam" and "Krymskyi mist".

== Biography ==
She graduated from Vinnytsia National Medical University. N. I. Pirogov and completed an internship in pediatrics. She has worked in wholesale trade, as a medical representative and business trainer for pharmaceutical companies.

She is married to Ruslan Horovyi.

== Creative work ==
Author of four collections of poetry: "Virsheniata-Kosheniata" (2019), "Virshynky" (2021), "Konotopska abetka" (2021, all three for children), "Siiu tobi v ochi" (2022; translated into Japanese and French).

She was published in the children's magazine "Piznaiko". She was engaged in poetic translation and adaptation of English-language children's songs for the Pershosvit channel.

Poem "The Enemy"

On 22 April 2022, Liudmyla Horova posted her poem "Vrazhe" on her Facebook page, which gained great popularity in a matter of hours. Subsequently, the Rivne alt-pop band Endzhi Kreida published a song of the same name based on the poem on YouTube. As of 20 February 2023, the video has received more than 12 million views and has become a trending video hosting service.

On 29 May 2022, the piece was performed at Oleksandr Viter's play "Smak sontsia".

It has been translated into Polish, English, German, Belarusian, Georgian, Japanese and French.
