= Milan (given name) =

Male name

- Pronunciation: Czech: [ˈmɪlan] Slovak: [ˈmilan] Hungarian: [ˈmilaːn] Serbo-Croatian: [mǐlan]
- Gender: Male
- Language: Slavic, Latin
- Name day: 19 May (Hungary) 18 June (Czech Republic); 13 November (Croatia) 27 November (Slovakia)

Origin
- Meaning: mil- (kind)
- Region of origin: Eastern Europe, Ancient Rome, Persia

Other names
- Alternative spelling: Cyrillic: Милан
- Related names: Variants and cognates
- See also: Miloš

Milan (Cyrillic: Милан) is a common Slavic male name and less commonly, a Roman name. It is derived from the Slavic element mil, with meanings kind, loving, and gracious. Milan was originally a diminutive or nickname for those whose Slavic names began with "Mil-". It is found in the Czech Republic, Slovakia, Serbia, Montenegro, Croatia, Bosnia and Herzegovina, Slovenia, North Macedonia, Bulgaria, Poland, Hungary, the Netherlands, and Belgium. It was in the top 5 names for boys born in Serbia in 2012. It was in the top 20 names for boys born in Slovakia in 2004. It was the eighth most popular name for boys born in the Netherlands in 2007, and seventh in Flanders in 2009. In Persian, Milan is also a given name, meaning "desire."

== Eastern European origin and use ==
It originates from the Old Slavic word mil, variant: mio, i.e. "beloved", "pleasant", "dear" which is common at the beginning of many Slavic names.

This is the same root in Serbian names like Miloslav, Milomir, Milica, Milka, Miloš, Milutin, Miodrag, Miomir etc. most of which were first recorded in Serbian sources already in the pre-Nemanjić Age.

According to the Czech calendar Milan's Day is on 18 June, Slovenian calendar: 11 September, 11 October, 12 November, Croatian calendar: 13 November, Slovak calendar: 27 November, Hungary: 19 May

=== Roman name ===
Milan is also a name used in Romance-speaking Europe owing to its Ancient Roman meaning of "eager and laborious". The people named like that are named after the Italian city by that name.

== Variants and cognates ==
Men's versions of the name: Milanek (diminutive), Miladin, Milad, Milanko, Milče, Milček, Milči, Milčo, Milušo, Mile, Milen, Milenko, Miletus, Mili, Milivoj, Milibor, Milidrag, Miligoj, Milija, Milijan, Milinko, Milislav, Milivoje, Milk, Milivojko, Miljan, Miljenko, Miljutin, Milko, Milodrag, Milogoj, Miloje, Milojko, Miloljub, Milomir, Milorad, Miloslav, Miloš, Miłosz, Bogumił, Milovan, Milun, Milutin, Miňo, Mišo

Female versions of the name: Milana, Milanka, Milena, Milica, Milijana, Miljanka, Milinka, Milislava, Milivoje, Milivojka, Mila, Miljana, Miljanka, Milka, Milojka, Milodraga, Milomirka, Milorada, Milosava, Milosavka, Miloslavka, Miloška, Milovana, Milovanka, Milunka

== Family names derived from names ==
From the name of Milan and its variants a number of surnames were created. The most famous are: Milanović, Milanovac, Milanković, Miłosław, Milanić, Milač, Milavec, Miletić, Milić, Miljković, and others.

== People ==
=== Politics and military ===
- Milan I of Serbia (1854–1901), Prince and later King of Serbia
- Milan Amruš (1848–1919), Croatian politician
- Milan Babić (1956–2006), Croatian Serb politician
- Milan Balažic (born 1958), Slovene politician and diplomat
- Milan Bandić (1955–2021), Croatian politician
- Milan Božić (politician) (born 1952), Serbian politician
- Milan Ftáčnik (1956–2021), Slovak politician
- Milan Hodža (1878–1944), Slovak politician, Prime Minister of Czechoslovakia
- Milan Jayathilaka (born 1981), Sri Lankan politician
- Milan Kučan (born 1941), President of Slovenia
- Milan Martić (born 1954), Croatian Serb politician
- Milan Mazurek (born 1994), Slovak politician
- Milan Nedić (1878–1946), Prime Minister of Nazi-occupied Serbia
- Milan Obrenović, Prince of Serbia (1819–1839), Prince of Serbia
- Milan Obrenović (revolutionary) (c. 1767 – 1810), Serbian military leader
- Milan Pogačnik (born 1946), Slovenian politician
- Milan Rastislav Štefánik (1880–1919), Slovak politician and astronomer
- Milan Šufflay (1879–1931), Croatian historian and politician
- Milan Uhrík (born 1984), Slovak politician
- Milan Urbáni (1944–2024), Slovak politician
- Milán Václavík (1928–2007), Slovak military general and politician
- Milan Veselinović (born 1956), Serbian politician
- Milan Višnjić (born 1950), Serbian medical doctor and politician

=== Arts and entertainment ===
- Milan (art director) (c. 1969 – 2023), Indian film art director
- Milan Begović (1876–1948), Croatian writer
- Milan Blažeković (1940–2019), Croatian animator
- Milan Dobeš (1929–2025), Czech graphical artist
- Milán Füst (1888–1967), Hungarian writer
- Milan Jaff (born 2000), Finnish-Iraqi rap artist and social media influencer
- Milan Konjević (born 1970), Serbian film director and screenwriter
- Milan Kundera (1929–2023), Czech writer
- Milan Luthria (born 1968), Indian film director
- Milan Marjanović (1879–1955), Croatian writer, literary critic and filmmaker
- Milan Mladenović (1958–1994), Serbian musician
- Milan Ogrizović (1877–1923), Croatian writer
- Milan Pleština (born 1961), Croatian actor
- Milan Radenkovich (1941–1971), stage name Milan the Leather Boy, American record producer and songwriter
- Milan Rakić (1876–1938), Serbian poet-diplomat and academic
- Milan Ressel (1934–2020), Czech painter
- Milan Richter (born 1948), Slovak writer
- Milan Rúfus (1928–2009), Slovak poet
- Milan Stanković (born 1987), Serbian singer
- Milan Štrljić (born 1952), Croatian actor
- Milan Švihálek (1944–2025), Czech dramaturge, screenwriter and journalist
- Milan Vítek (born 1938), Czech violinist

=== Sports ===
- Milan Acquaah (born 1997), American basketball player
- Milan Aleksić (born 1986), Serbian water polo player
- Milan Baroš (born 1981), Czech footballer
- Milan Biševac (born 1983), Serbian footballer
- Milan Bolden-Morris, American basketball player and football coach
- Milan Borjan (born 1987), Canadian soccer player
- Milan Božić (footballer) (born 1982), Canadian soccer player
- Milan van Ewijk (born 2000), Dutch footballer
- Milan Havel (born 1994), Czech footballer
- Milan Hejduk (born 1976), Czech ice hockey player
- Milan Iloski (born 1999), American footballer
- Milan Jovanović (footballer, born 1981), Serbian footballer
- Milan Jovanović (footballer, born July 1983), Montenegrin footballer
- Milan Jovanović (footballer, born October 1983), Serbian footballer
- Milan Jovanović (handballer) (born 1998), Serbian handball player
- Milan Jovanović (strongman) (born 1970), Serbian powerlifter
- Milan Karlíček (born 1981), Czech ice hockey player
- Milan Lucic (born 1988), Canadian ice hockey player
- Milan Máčala (born 1943), Czech football coach
- Milan Mačvan (born 1989), Serbian basketball player
- Milan Michálek (born 1984), Czech ice hockey player
- Milan Momcilovic (born 2004), American basketball player
- Milan Radin (born 1991), Serbian footballer
- Milan Rastavac (born 1973), Serbian football manager
- Milan Rapaić (born 1973), Croatian footballer
- Milan Ristovski (born 1998), Macedonian footballer
- Milan Robin (born 1999), French footballer
- Milan Rodić (born 1991), Serbian footballer
- Milan Škriniar (born 1995), Slovak footballer
- Milan Toman (born 1979), Czech ice hockey player
- Milan Tomić (born 1973), Serbian-Greek basketball player
- Milan Tošnar (1925–2016), Czech athlete and coach
- Milan Vápenka (1943–2013), Czech volleyball player
- Milan Varga (born 1983), Slovak ice hockey player
- Milan Vasojević (1932–1996), Serbian basketball coach
- Milan Vidakov (born 2000), Serbian footballer
- Milan Vidmar (canoeist) (born 1942), Slovenian canoeist
- Milan Vignjević (born 1989), Serbian footballer
- Milan Vilotić (born 1986), Serbian footballer
- Milan Vissie (born 1995), Dutch footballer
- Milan Vooletich (1941–2006), American football player and coach
- Milan Vučićević (born 1985), Serbian basketball player
- Milan Vukotić (born 2002), Montenegrin footballer

=== Other ===
- Milan Kangrga (1923–2008), Croatian philosopher
- Milan Karvaš (1932–2024), Slovak chemist
- Milan Komar (1921–2006), Slovene-Argentine philosopher
- Milan Levar (c. 1954 – 2000), Croatian whistleblower
- Milan Machovec (1925–2003), Czech philosopher
- Milan Mandarić (1938–2025), Serbian-American businessman
- Milan Moguš (1927–2017), Croatian linguist
- Milan Puskar (1934–2011), American entrepreneur
- Milan Radoičić (born 1978), Serbian businessman
- Milan Rešetar (1860–1942), Croatian linguist and historian
- Milan Šašik (1952–2020), Slovak bishop
- Milan Sijerković (1935–2018), Croatian meteorologist
- Milan Vidmar (1885–1962), Slovenian engineer, chess player and philosopher

== Legendary or fictional characters ==
- Milan Toplica, legendary Serbian knight
- Milan Hendrickx, a recurring character in the Belgian series wtFOCK

== See also ==
- Slavic names
- Milano (disambiguation)#People
