= Miloš =

- Pronunciation: Czech: [ˈmɪloʃ] Serbo-Croatian: [mǐloʃ] (given name), [mîloʃ] (surname); Slovak: [ˈmilɔʂ]
- Gender: male
- Language: Slavic

Origin
- Origin: Slavic
- Meaning: hypocorism of Miloslav, from Slavic mil-, "compassionate, dear", and the hypocoristic suffix -oš (similar to the Latin suffix -us).

Other names
- Alternative spelling: Milosh, Cyrillic: Милош, Miłosz
- Variant forms: female: Milena, Mileva, Milka, Milojka, Milica, Mila
- Derived: Milošević
- Related names: Mile, Milo, Bogomil, Milan, Miloje, Miliša, Miladin, Milat, Mileta, Milojko, Milasin, Milohna, Milovan, Milomir, Milutin, Milenko, Milinko, Milko, Milić, Miodrag, Miloslav, Milisav, Milosav, Miogost, Milman, Milorad, Milivoj, Milivoje

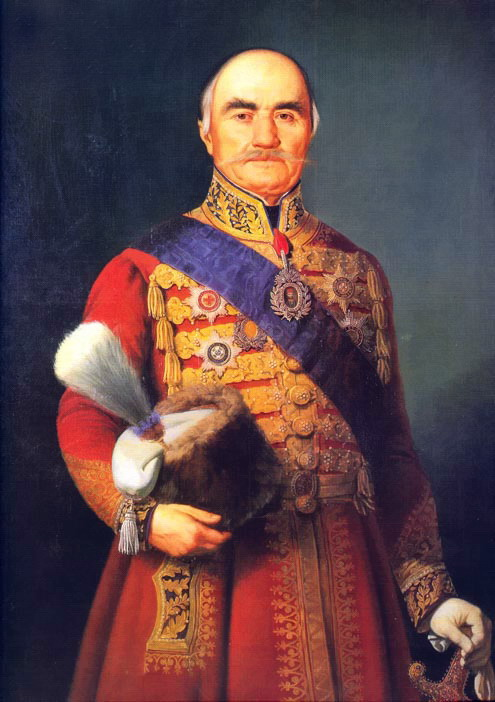
A portrait of Miloš Obrenović, former prince of Serbia

Miloš (Cyrillic: Милош), Milos, Miłosz or spelling variations thereof is a mainly male Slavic given name and a surname. It may refer to:

== Given name ==
=== Sportsmen ===
- Miłosz Bernatajtys, Polish rower
- Miloš Bogunović, Serbian footballer
- Miloš Budaković, Serbian footballer
- Miloš Ćuk, Serbian water polo player, Olympic champion
- Miloš Dimitrijević, Serbian footballer
- Miloš Đelmaš, Serbian footballer
- Miloš Holuša, Czech race walker
- Miloš Jojić, Serbian footballer
- Milos Kerkez, Serbian-Hungarian footballer
- Miloš Korolija, Serbian water polo player
- Miloš Krasić, Serbian footballer
- Miloš Marić, Serbian footballer
- Miloš Milošević, Croatian swimmer
- Miloš Milutinović, Serbian footballer and manager
- Miloš Nikić, Serbian volleyball player
- Miloš Ninković, Serbian footballer
- Miloš Pavlović (racing driver), Serbian racing driver
- Milos Raonic, Montenegrin-born Canadian tennis player
- Miloš Stanojević (rower), Serbian rower
- Miloš Šestić, Serbian footballer
- Miloš Teodosić, Serbian basketball player
- Miloš Terzić (volleyball), Serbian volleyball player
- Miloš Tomić, Serbian rower
- Miloš Vasić, Serbian rower
- Miloš Vemić, Serbian volleyball player
- Miloš Vujanić, Serbian basketball player

=== Other ===
- Milos Alcalay (born 1945), Venezuelan diplomat
- Miloš Vojinović (fl. 1330), Serbian nobleman
- Miloš Obilić (fl. 1389), possibly legendary Serbian knight
- Miloš Crnjanski, Serbian poet, author, diplomat
- Millosh Gjergj Nikolla, Albanian poet
- Miloš Forman, Czech film director, screenwriter, actor and professor
- Miloš Samolov, Serbian actor
- Miloš Jakeš (1922–2020), Czechoslovak politician
- Miloš Karadaglić, Montenegrin classical guitarist
- Milos Milos (1941–1966), Serbian-born American actor, stunt double and bodyguard
- Miloš Obrenović, Prince of Serbia
- Miloš Tichý, Czech astronomer
- Miloš Zahradník, Czech mathematician
- Miloš Zeman, former President of the Czech Republic
- Miłosz Magin, Polish composer and pianist
- Miłosz Biedrzycki, Polish poet, translator and geophysical engineer
- Miloš Biković, Serbian actor
- Miloš Pocerac (1776–1811), Serbian revolutionary

== Surname ==
- Czesław Miłosz (1911–2004), Polish poet and winner of the Nobel Prize in Literature 1980.
- Andrzej Miłosz (1917–2002), brother of Czesław and a journalist, translator, and documentary film producer
- Oscar Milosz (1877–1939), poet and diplomat who wrote in French and a cousin of Czesław Miłosz
- Stephen Milosz (1955–2022), Australian cricket player
- Ljubo Miloš (1919–1948), Croatian World War II official and concentration camp commandant executed for war crimes
- Mato Miloš, Croatian footballer
- Milos Milos (1941–1966), Serbian-born American actor, stunt double and bodyguard
- Nenad Miloš, Serbian swimmer
- Predrag Miloš, Serbian swimmer
