= Baljci, Ružić =

Baljci
- Village
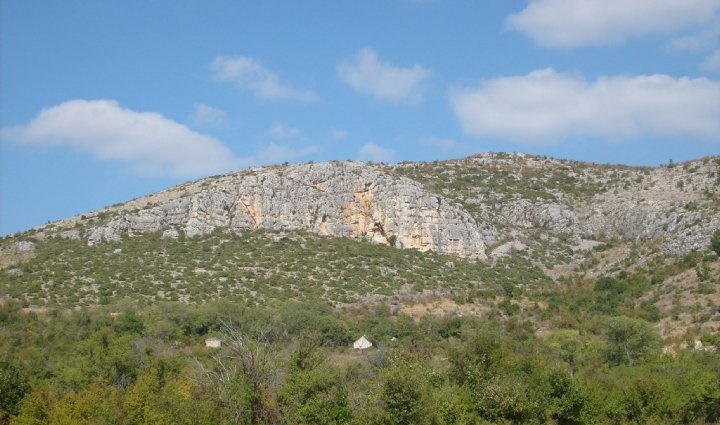
- A view of Jošića Greda, a famous cliff from Baljci

- Location within Croatia
- Coordinates: 43°49′N 16°18′E
- Country: Croatia
- County: Šibenik-Knin
- Municipality: Ružić

Area
  - Total: 26.7 km^{2} (10.3 sq mi)

Population (2021)
  - Total: 8
  - Density: 0.30/km^{2} (0.78/sq mi)
- Time zone: UTC+1 (CET)
  - Summer (DST): UTC+2 (CEST)

Baljci (Serbian Cyrillic: Баљци), also referred to as Baljke (Serbian Cyrillic: Баљке), is a village in the Dalmatian Hinterland, southeast of Knin in the Šibenik-Knin County. The settlement is administered as a part of the Ružić municipality.

Before the Croatian war the village was mostly populated by ethnic Serbs, with a tiny Croat minority. The main economic activity was agriculture and animal husbandry. Following the Operation Storm in August 1995, the village became uninhabited and all Serb houses were looted and destroyed. In recent years, some people have started to rebuild their houses and a small number of former villagers have decided to resettle in Baljci.

== Geography ==
Baljci consists of Gornji Baljci ("Upper Baljci") and Donji Baljci ("Lower Baljci"). Gornji Baljci is located in the Svilaja mountains. Donji Baljci extends to the valley of the river Čikola in Petrovo Polje, which is mainly used for agriculture.

== History ==
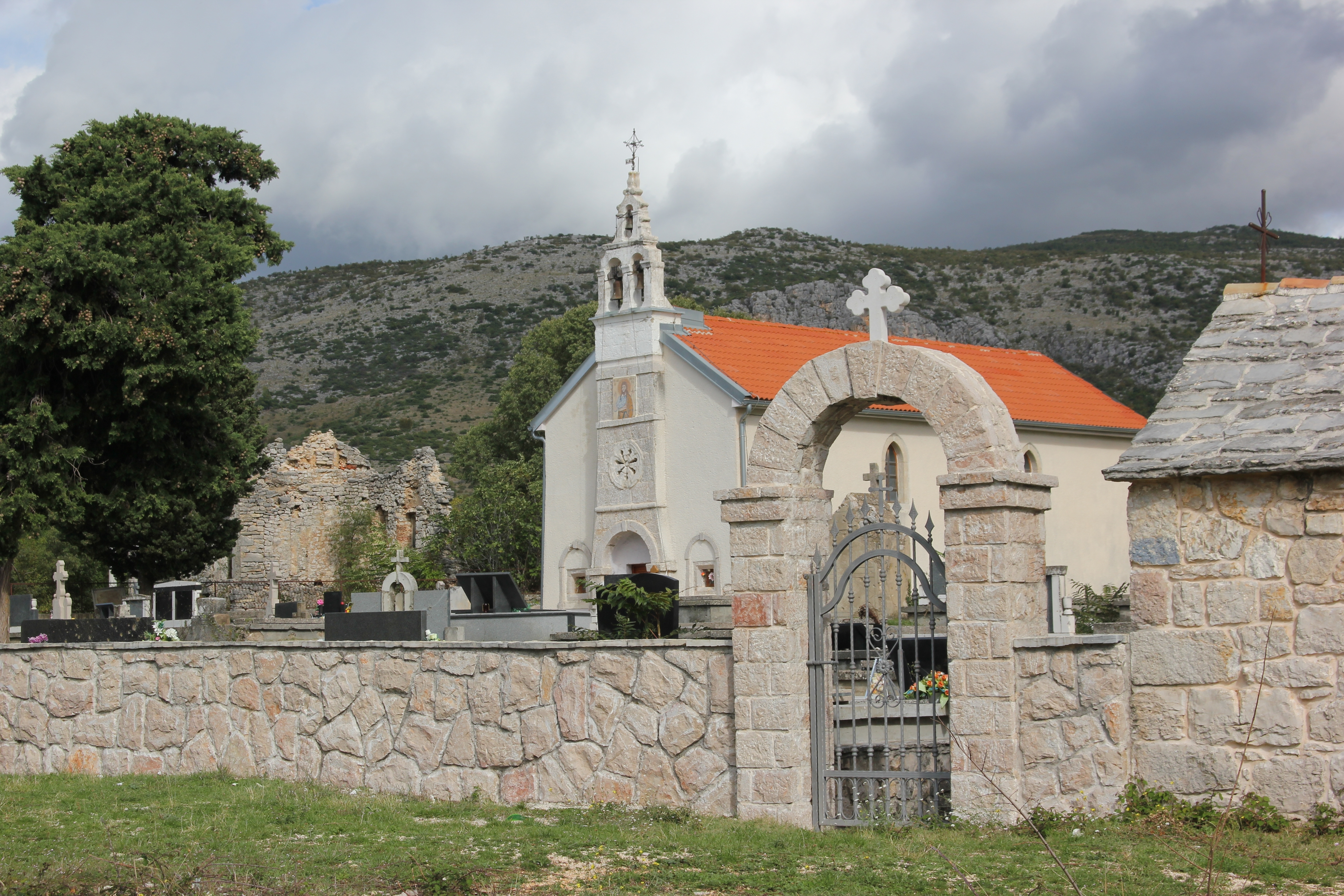
Serbian Orthodox church and cemetery gates in Baljci

Baljci was founded during the 16th century by vlachs coming from Eastern Herzegovina, who essentially belonged to the Mirilovići clan. These people, who were of Serbian Orthodox faith, were settled there by the Turks after the previous population had almost entirely fled to the Republic of Venice and the Kingdom of Hungary. The name of the village itself was probably chosen in reference to Baljci in Herzegovina, from where some of the new settlers came from, as for the neighboring settlement of Mirilović, today known as Mirlović Polje. Over a few decades, Baljci was definitely established on the territory of a former medieval village known in historical sources as Suhovare. Under this former settlement name, Baljci was included in the Ottoman nahiye of Petrovo Polje, itself part of the Sanjak of Klis.

At the end of the 17h century, after the War of Candia, Baljci and the neighboring villages were annexed by the Republic of Venice. New settlers came to the village in the 18th century, which also saw the building of an Orthodox church dedicated to St. John the Baptist in 1730.

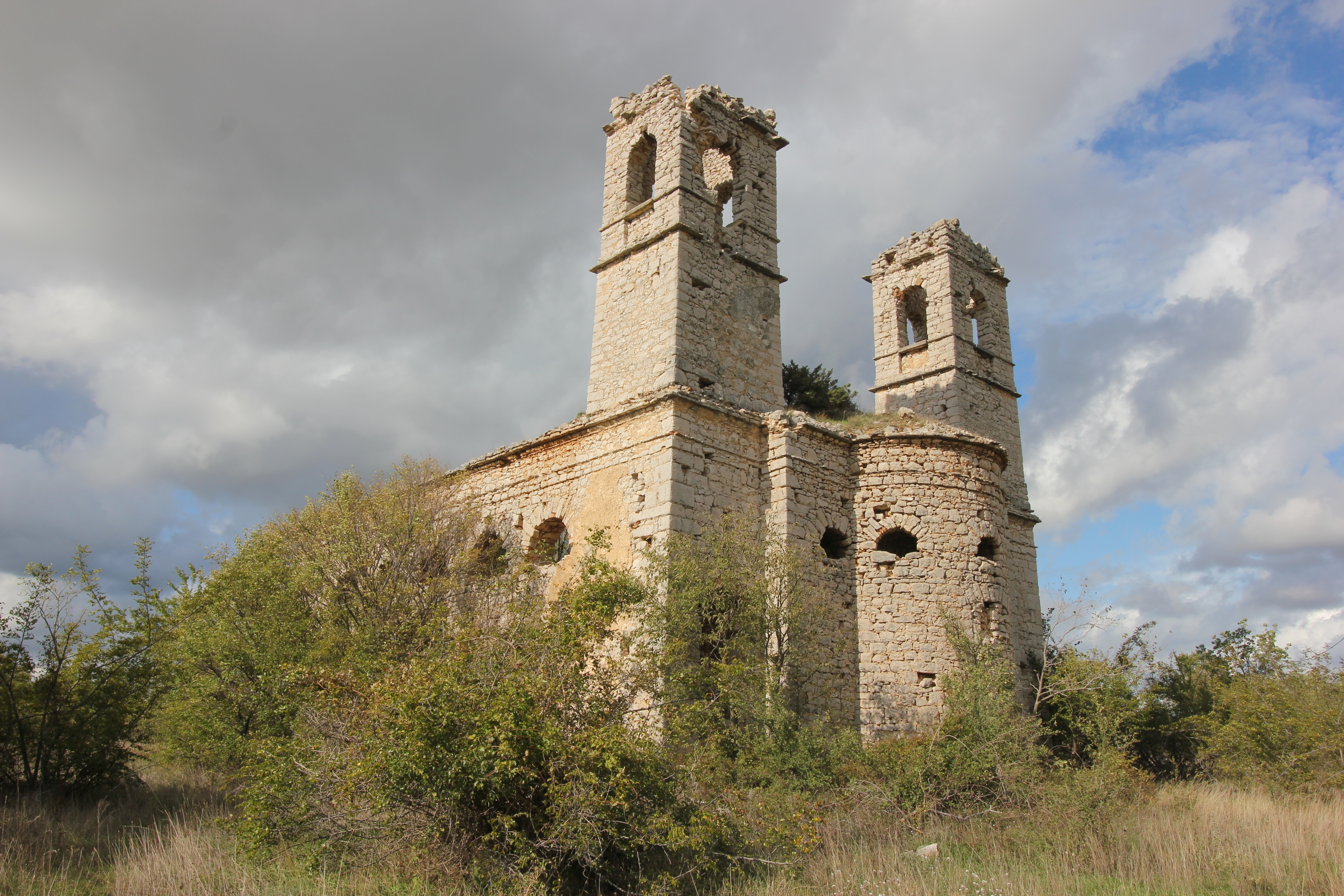
Ruins of the Greek Catholic church of the Transfiguration of the Lord

In 1815 Dalmatia became a crown land of the Austrian Empire. Emperor Francis II decided to put the Orthodox eparchy from Dalmatia under the Catholic hierarchy, exhorting the local Serbian Orthodox clergy to accept union with the Catholic Church. The attempt was successful when, on 31 January 1832, Marko Busović and Petar Krička, two former Orthodox priests from Baljci and Kričke, became Uniates: they accepted to profess the Catholic faith while remaining faithful to their Eastern Christian rite and tradition. Baljci then saw the rapid building of a Greek Catholic church dedicated to the Transfiguration of the Lord. After that, many Serbs from Baljci became Uniates, with a population of up to 228 people in 1850. However, in 1849, Orthodoxy was recognized as an official cult of the Austrian empire, an event which prevented further mass conversions to Greek Catholicism. Uniates from Baljci started either to convert back to Orthodoxy or to migrate to larger cities of Dalmatia and Slavonia. In 1890, only 28 of them remained in the village. The Greek Catholic church was burnt down in 1942 and after World War II, Greek Catholicism completely disappeared from Baljci.

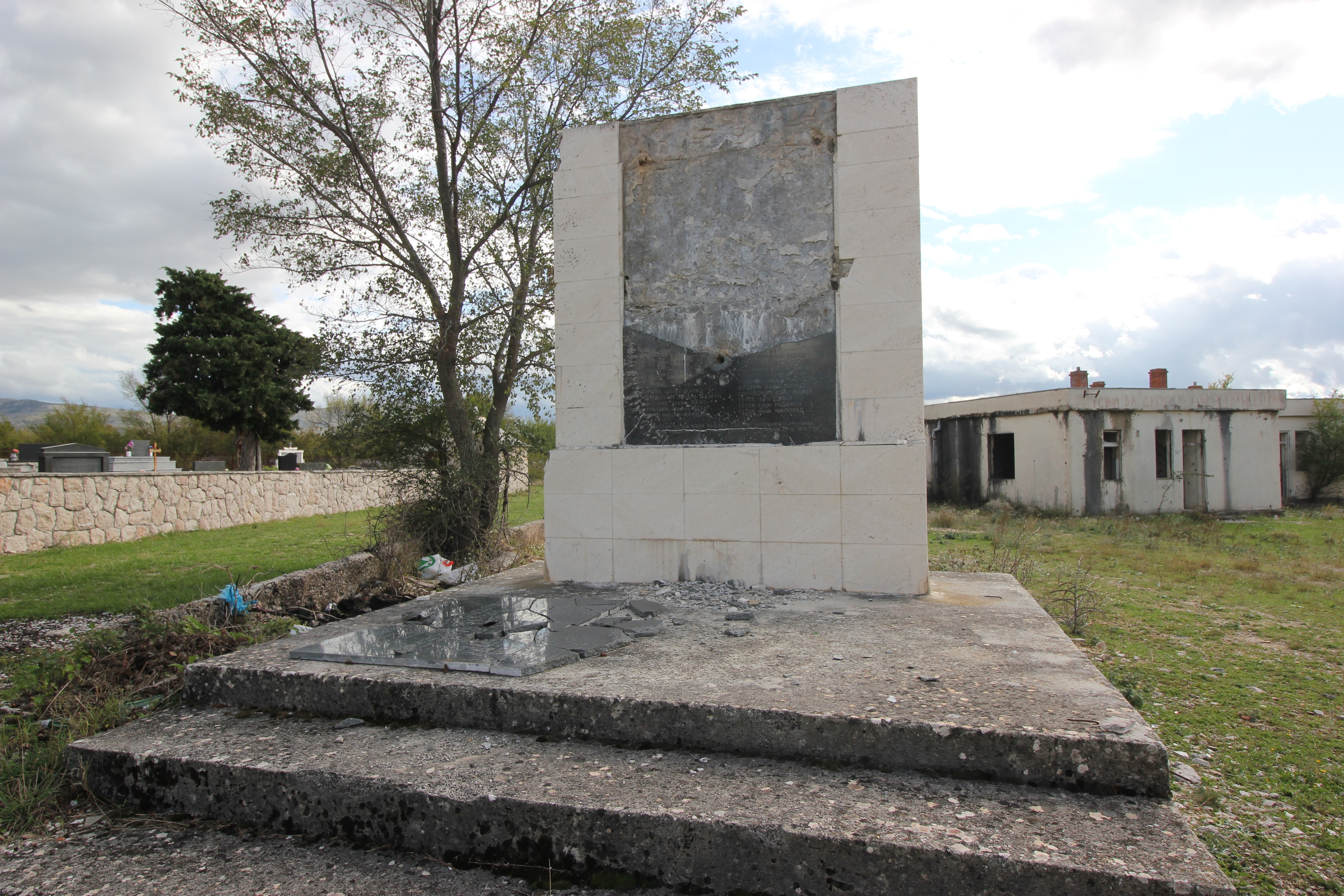
Damaged memorial commemorating Baljci's fallen Partisans during World War II

During World War II most men from Baljci entered the Resistance, being divided between Chetniks and Partisans. In 1942, Baljci was mostly a Chetnik stronghold of about 300 men, where the headquarters of the Svilaja Brigade were located. In 1943 and particularly after the surrender of Italy, Partisans became the most important of the two groups, even managing to attract Chetniks deserters. A memorial commemorating Baljci's fallen Partisans was erected in 1977 in the central place of the village, near the church.

In the decades following World War II some people from Baljci migrated to Serbia, were they settled mainly in Šid. Others migrated to Western countries, mostly in Germany, often to work as laborers.

During the Croatian War of Independence Baljci was part of the Republic of Serbian Krajina. Following the Operation Storm, in August 1995, the village became uninhabited after the Serbian population fled to Serbia and all their houses were looted, burned and destroyed. In 1998, 15 gravestones from the Orthodox cemetery, belonging mostly to the Bibić and Jošić families, were destroyed. Damaged during the war, the Orthodox church was restored in 2006 thanks to a donation from former NBA player Dragan Tarlać, whose ancestors were from Baljci. However, a few years later, the memorial to fallen Partisans was heavily damaged by unknown individuals. While still lacking proper infrastructure, some people from Baljci started to rebuild their houses in the 2010s.

== Demographics ==
Population trends 1857–2021
v

population	549	420	443	490	489	541	562	690	625	649	617	633	641	470	2	3	8
	1857	1869	1880	1890	1900	1910	1921	1931	1948	1953	1961	1971	1981	1991	2001	2011	2021

Sources: Croatian Bureau of Statistics publications

=== Ethnic composition ===
In 1961 Yugoslavian authorities started detailed censuses, including nationalities and minorities for each settlement. The last one was conducted in 1991, before the war. Results of these censuses are shown in the following table:

Population of Baljci
Year	Serbs	Croats	Hungarians	Yugoslavs	Others or unknown	Total
1961	590 (95.62%)	27 (4.38%)	0 (0%)	0 (0%)	0 (0%)	617
1971	606 (95.73%)	26 (4.11%)	1 (0.16%)	0 (0%)	0 (0%)	633
1981	597 (93.14%)	13 (2.03%)	0 (0%)	22 (3.43%)	9 (1.40%)	641
1991	453 (96.38%)	13 (2.77%)	0 (0%)	0 (0%)	4 (0.85%)	470

== Economy ==
Before the war, the main economic activity was agriculture and animal husbandry. Baljci was locally famous for its production of Drniš ham (Croatian: Drniški Pršut).

== Culture ==
The village Slava is the site of the Nativity of John the Baptist (Ivanjdan), celebrated on 7 July. For over a decade, dozens of former villagers and their relatives have been coming to Baljci on this day.

== Surnames ==
The following surnames are those of families that lived in the village until 1995:

- Arambašić, Serbs, slava of St. Nicholas
- Bašić, Serbs, St. Nicholas
- Bešević, Serbs, St. Nicholas
- Bibić, Serbs, St. Nicholas
- Džaleta, Serbs, St. Nicholas
- Gegić, Serbs, slava of Lazarus Saturday
- Gligorić, Serbs, slava of St. George
- Gugić, Croats
- Gutić, Serbs, St. George
- Janković, Serbs, Lazarus Saturday
- Jošić, Serbs, Lazarus Saturday
- Klisurić, Serbs, Lazarus Saturday
- Milanković, Serbs, Lazarus Saturday
- Mudrić, Serbs
- Obradović, Serbs, St. Nicholas
- Radomilović, Serbs, St. George
- Romac, Serbs, St George
- Tarlać, Serbs, St. Nicholas
- Tetek, Serbs, St. Nicholas
- Tošić, Serbs, St. George
- Vidović, Croats

The following surnames were also found in the 19th century and early 20th century:

- Borojević, Serbs
- Knez, Serbs
- Makšić, Serbs
- Puđaš, Serbs

The Venetian cadastres of Baljci from 1711 and 1755 give older surnames that have disappeared from the village or were later present in the neighboring settlements of Mirlović Polje and Gradac:

- Bodgan, written as Bodganović; found in Mirlović Polje in the 20th century
- Grbešić
- Grubišić, still present in Gradac
- Jajćanin
- Kovačević
- Munimagarac
- Ninčević
- Poplašen, sometimes written as Poplašenović; found in Mirlović Polje in the 20th century
- Savić
- Vukčević

Finally, a few older surnames can be found in the writings of the notaries of Šibenik from the 16th and 17th centuries. They come from people from Baljci, called Morlachs by the Venetians, who went to Šibenik to sell their products and buy merchandises unavailable in the Dalmatian Hinterland.

- Cvitković
- Gredelj, also written as Gredeljević
- Luljić
- Milivojević
- Pavlović
- Rutnić
- Slipčević

=== History of Baljci's families ===
The oldest attested surname of current Baljci's families is Bibić, coming from Radivoj Bibić, who went to Šibenik in 1620 and 1628. However, an earlier mention, not of a surname but of a first name, is of a person named Poplah, from the Ottoman census of Suhovare (Baljci's previous name), in 1574. This Poplah is most likely the ancestor of the Poplašen family. Similarly, the brothers Vuško and Radivoj Bogdanović, who went to Šibenik in 1601, are probably related to the Bogdan family of Mirlović Polje.

In the Venetian cadastre of 1711 five of the current surnames of Baljci are mentioned: Bešević, Bibić, Jošić, Klisurić and Milanković, as well as Bogdan and Poplašen, who were at that time considered to be located in Baljci. The surnames Gegić and Gugić are first mentioned in the cadastre from 1755, while Radomilović is mentioned in the cadastre of Gradac of the same years. From the cadastre of Baljci from 1711, we learn that two members of the Bešević brotherhood had the same name, Jovan, and received nicknames to be distinguished from each other. One was Jovan Bešević called Obrad (Zuane Besevich ditta Obrad), the other Jovan Bešević called Miloš (Zuane Besevich ditta Milos). The first one became the founder of Baljci's Obradović family, a fact that is proven by the cadastre from 1755, where the surname Obradović is added to the name of the descendants of the aforementioned Jovan: Jovan Bešević called Obradović and Petar Bešević called Obradović. On this matter, the cadastre from 1755 in even more interesting, because two other Jovan Bešević were nicknamed: one was Jovan Bešević called Novak, the other Jovan Bešević called Tarlać. The first one explains why Bešević's family members were often called Novaci in the past, while the second is the direct ancestor of the Tarlać family. In the same cadastre, there is also a mention of the harambaša Stojan Bešević, who is most likely the ancestor of Baljci's Arambašić family. Similarly, the Romac family comes from another nickname, that of Jovan Bogdan called Romac, while the Džaleta family comes from Petar Bibić called Džaleta. Finally, the Venetian cadastre from 1755 also testifies to the arrival of a new family from Plavno, the Munimagarac, one member of which, Gligorije Munimagarac, is probably the founder of Baljci's Gligorić family. These two cadastres explain the origin of most of Baljci's families, with the exceptions of the Bašić, Gutić, Janković, Mudrić, Tetek and Tošić.

== Sources ==
- Bačko, Aleksandar (2008). Porodice dalmatinskih Srba [Dalmatian Serb families] (in Serbian). Belgrade: Udruženje građana "Srpski despot".
- Croatian Helsinki Committee for Human Rights (2001). Military Operation Storm and it's [sic] Aftermath (PDF). Zagreb.
- Jakovljević, Aleksandar; Isailović, Neven (2013). "Popis nahije Petrovo Polje iz 1574. godine". Initial. A Review of Medieval Studies (in Serbian). 1.
- Jakovljević, Aleksandar; Isailović, Neven (2019). Petrovo polje u vrelima osmanskog razdoblja (1528. – 1604.) (in Croatian). Šibenik: Državni arhiv u Šibeniku. ISBN 978-953-7998-18-9.
- Juran, Kristijan (2014). "Doseljavanje Morlaka u opustjela sela šibenske Zagore u 16. stoljeću". Povijesni prilozi (in Croatian). 46.
- Juran, Kristijan (2015). "Morlaci u Šibeniku između Ciparskoga i Kandijskog rata (1570. – 1645.)". Povijesni prilozi (in Croatian). 49.
- Mišur, Ivo (2021). "Brief history of the Greek Catholics of Dalmatia". Theologos. 1.
- Zbornik dokumenata i podataka o narodnooslobodilačkom ratu Jugoslovenskih naroda (in Serbo-Croatian). Vol. V (26). Belgrade: Vojnoistorijski Institut. 1961.
