= Milenković =

Milenković, Milenkovič, or Milenkovic (Cyrillic script: Миленковић) is a patronymic surname derived from a masculine given name Milenko. It may refer to:

- Aleksandar Milenković (born 1967), Serbian cyclist, biathlete and cross-country skier
- Aleksandar Milenković (born 1994), Austrian and Serbian football player
- Ana Milenković (born 1980), Serbian singer, member of the band Beauty Queens
- Anja Milenkovič (born 1982), Slovenian football player
- Bojana Milenković (born 1997), Serbian volleyball player
- Borko Milenković (born 1984), Serbian football player
- Božidar Milenković (1954–2020), Serbian football player and coach
- Dalibor Milenković (born 1987), Serbian football player
- Dragan Milenković (born 1984), Macedonian basketball player
- Gordana Milenković (born 1966), Serbian politician
- Ivan Milenković (born 1983), Serbian football player
- Ksenija Milenković (born 1975), Serbian politician and diplomat
- Marko Milenković (born 1974), Serbian politician
- Marko Milenkovič (born 1976), Slovenian swimmer
- Mirjana Milenković (born 1985), Montenegrin handball player
- Nenad Milenković (born 1972), Serbian politician
- Nikica Milenković (born 1959), Croatian football player and manager
- Nikola Milenković (born 1997), Serbian football player
- Ninoslav Milenković (born 1977), Bosnian football player
- Olgica Milenkovic, electrical engineer from former Yugoslavia
- Pavle Milenković (born 1964), Serbian sociologist
- Philip Milenković (born 1988), Swedish football player
- Radoslav Milenković (born 1958), Serbian theatre director
- Radoslav Lale Milenković (1926–2014), Yugoslav and Serbian painter
- Stefan Milenković (born 1977), Serbian concert violinist
- Vid Milenkovic (born 1995), Swiss basketball player
- Vladimir Milenković (born 1982), Serbian football player
- Živojin Milenković (1928–2008), Serbian actor
- Milenković family: Svetozar Milenković (1907–1983), Vida Milenković (1912–1992), and Aleksandar Petrović (1917–1944), Serbians who protected Jewish people during the Holocaust

== See also ==
- Melenki
- Milanović
- Milinković
- Milinović
- Milankovic (disambiguation)
