= Aleksandar Miljković =

Aleksandar Miljković may refer to:

- Aleksandar Miljković (footballer born 1982), midfielder
- Aleksandar Miljković (footballer born 1990), defender
- Aleksandar Miljković (musician), doublebassist
