= Milanović =

Milanović (Cyrillic: Милановић) is a South Slavic surname derived from a masculine given name Milan.

Notable people with the surname include:

- Božo Milanović (1890–1980), Croatian priest, theologian and politician
- Branko Milanović (born 1953), Lead economist in the World Bank's research department
- Fred Milanovich (1915–1997), American politician
- Igor Milanović (born 1965), retired Serbian water polo player
- Ivana Milanovic, Serbian and American mechanical engineer
- Milan Milanović (born 1991), Serbian professional footballer
- Miloš Milanović (born 1981), Serbian figure skater
- Nicolas Milanovic (born 2001), Australian soccer player
- Sanja Musić Milanović (born 1969), Croatian scientist
- Scott Milanovich (born 1973), American and Canadian football quarterback and coach
- Slobodan Milanović (born 1992), Bosnian footballer
- Sofía Mulánovich (born 1983), Peruvian surfer
- Tanja Milanović (born 1977), former handballer from Serbia, playing left back
- Toni Milanović (born 1990), Croatian kickboxer
- Vesna Milanović-Litre (born 1986), Croatian handballer
- Zoran Milanović (born 1966), Croatian politician, President of Croatia and former Prime Minister of Croatia
- Željko Milanović (born 1957), Croatian handball player and coach

Notable fictional characters with the name include:

- Goran Milanovic, a Croatian character in the UK soap opera Coronation Street

== See also ==
- Milanković
- Milinković
- Milinović
- Milanovac (disambiguation)
- Milović
- Milić
