= Zahradnik =

Zahradnik, Zahradník or Záhradník is a surname. Notable people with the surname include:

- 11408 Zahradník, main belt asteroid with an orbital period of 2059
- Karel Zahradnik (1848–1916), Czech mathematician at the University of Zagreb
- Miloš Zahradník (born 1951), Czech mathematician who works on statistical mechanics in Charles University in Prague
- Rudolf Zahradník (1928–2020), Czech chemist
- Stanisław Zahradnik (born 1932), Polish historian

== See also ==
- Záhradné (Hungarian: Szedi-Kert)
- Zahradníček (cs)
- Zahrádkář (cs)
