= Švihálek =

Švihálek (feminine: Švihálková) is a Czech surname. Notable people with the surname include:

- Milan Švihálek (1944–2025), Czech dramaturge, screenwriter and journalist
