= Milko (name) =

Milko (Cyrillic script: Милко) is a Slavic name that may refer to:

Given name

- Milko Bambič (1905–1991), Slovene illustrator, cartoonist, caricaturist, inventor and painter
- Milko Bjelica (born 1984), Serbian professional basketball player
- Milko Bobotsov (1931–2000), Bulgarian chess grandmaster
- Milko Brezigar (1886–1958), Slovene liberal economist
- Milko Campus (born 1969), Italian long jumper
- Milko Đurovski (born 1963), Yugoslav and Macedonian football coach and former player
- Milko Foucault-Larche (born 1960), Mauritian Australian entertainer
- Milko Gaydarski (1946–1989), Bulgarian football player
- Milko Gjurovski (born 1963), Macedonian football player and manager
- Milko Kalaidjiev, Bulgarian pop-folk singer
- Milko Kazanov (born 1970), Bulgarian flatwater canoer
- Milko Kelemen (1924–2018), Croatian composer
- Milko Novaković (born 1988), Serbian-born Montenegrin football player
- Milko Šparemblek (1928–2025), Croatian dancer, choreographer and director

Surname

- Jean Milko, American politician
- Vadym Milko, Ukrainian football midfielder

== See also ==
- Milka (given name)
- Miljko, a Serbian masculine given name
- Milan (given name)
