= Miletich =

Miletich is a surname. Notable people with the surname include:

- Lyubomir Miletich (1863–1937), Bulgarian academic
- Pat Miletich (born 1968), American mixed martial arts fighter

== See also ==
- Miletić
