= Milovanov =

Milovanov or Milovanova (feminine), sometimes spelled Mylovanov/Mylovanova, is a Slavic last name derived from the male given name Milovan (a Slavic name derived from the passive adjective milovati ("caress")).

The following people share this last name:

- Bohdan Milovanov (born 1998), Ukrainian football player
- Fyodor Milovanov (born 1979), Russian football player
- Ivan Milovanov (born 1989), Russian futsal player
- Sima Milovanov (1923–2002), Serbian football player and manager
- Tymofiy Mylovanov (born 1975), Ukrainian economist

== See also ==
- Milovan
- Milovanović
