= Mićanović =

Mićanović is a Serbian surname. Notable people with the surname include:

- Dragan Mićanović (born 1970), Serbian actor
- Mladen Mićanović (born 1996), Serbian footballer

== See also ==
- Milanović
