= Baljci =

Baljci may refer to:

- Baljci, Bileća, a village in Bosnia and Herzegovina
- Baljci, Ružić, a village in Croatia
- Baljci, Tomislavgrad, a village in Bosnia and Herzegovina
