= Miljković =

Miljković (Serbian Cyrillic: Миљковић, pronounced [mǐːʎkoʋitɕ]) is a South Slavic surname, derived from the masculine given name Miljko. It is predominantly Serbian, also found in the rest of former Yugoslavia. It may refer to:

- Aleksandar Miljković (footballer born 1982), midfielder
- Aleksandar Miljković (footballer born 1990), defender
- Aleksandar Miljković (musician), doublebassist
- Boris Miljković (born 1956), prolific Serbian artist, TV and theatre director, video artist, creative director, etc.
- Branko Miljković (1934–1961), iconic Serbian poet
- Emil Miljković (born 1988), Bosnian footballer
- Ivan Miljković (born 1979), Serbian volleyball player
- Ivica Miljković (born 1947), former Croatian football player
- Husein Miljković (1905–1944), Bosnian Muslim military commander
- Nemanja Miljković (1990–2020), Serbian basketball player
- Viki Miljković (born 1974), Serbian singer, popular in the former Yugoslav republics
- Vojkan Miljković (born 1991), Serbian footballer

== See also ==
- Miljkovići, plural form
