= Milivoje =

Milivoje (Serbian: Миливоје) is a masculine given name. Notable people with the name include:

- Milivoje Blaznavac (1824–1873), Serbian soldier and politician
- Milivoje Božović (born 1985), Serbian professional basketball player
- Milivoje Mićo Božović (born 1957), Montenegrin composer
- Milivoje Ćirković (born 1977), Serbian former professional footballer
- Milivoje Lazić (born 1978), Slovenian-born Serbian professional basketball coach
- Milivoje Mijović (born 1991), Serbian basketball player
- Milivoje Novaković (born 1979), former Slovenian footballer
- Milivoje Stojanović (1973–1914), Serbian military commander
- Milivoje Tomić (1920–2000), Serbian actor
- Milivoje Trbić, Yugoslav army captain (kapetan) and member of the Chetniks during World War II
- Milivoje Vitakić (born 1977), Serbian former professional footballer
- Milivoje Živanović (1900–1976), renowned Serbian film and stage actor

== See also ==
- Milivoj
- Milivojce
- Milivojevci
- Milivojević
