= Antunovac =

Antunovac may refer to:

- Antunovac, Osijek-Baranja County, a village and a municipality near Osijek, formerly known as Tenjski Antunovac
- Antunovac, Velika, a village in Požega-Slavonia County, Croatia
- Antunovac, Lipik, a village in Požega-Slavonia County, Croatia
- Novi Antunovac, a village near Špišić Bukovica, Virovitica-Podravina County, Croatia
- Bukovački Antunovac, a village near Nova Bukovica, Virovitica-Podravina County, Croatia
