= Milosavljević =

Milosavljević (Serbian Cyrillic: Милосављевић) is a Serbian patronymic surname derived from a masculine given name Milosav. It may refer to:

- Danica Milosavljevic (1925–2018), Serbian Partisan fighter
- Dejana Milosavljević (born 1994), Croatian handball player
- Dragan Milosavljević (born 1989), basketball player
- Ivan Milosavljević (born 1983), footballer
- Marko Milosavljević (born 1985), footballer
- Nedeljko Milosavljević (born 1960), footballer
- Nenad Milosavljević (born 1954), musician
- Predrag Milosavljević (born 1908–1989), painter
- Radomir Milosavljević (born 1992), footballer
- Ružica Milosavljević (born 1946), chess player
- Slobodan Milosavljević (born 1965), economist and politician
- Tomica Milosavljević (born 1955), physician and politician
- Uroš Milosavljević (born 1982), footballer
- Veljko Milosavljević (born 2007), footballer
- Vladislava Milosavljević (born 1955), Serbian actress
- Zaviša Milosavljević (born 1961), football manager

== See also ==
- Milisavljević
