= Rodrigo Kenton =

Costa Rican footballer (born 1955)

Rodrigo Kenton Johnson
Personal information
- Full name: Rodrigo Kenton Johnson
- Date of birth: March 5, 1955 (age 71)
- Place of birth: Limón, Costa Rica
- Height: 1.81 m (5 ft 11 in)
- Position: Forward

Youth career
- 1968–1972: Deportivo Acón
- 1972: Estrella Roja

Senior career*
Years	Team	Apps	(Gls)
1973–1978	Limonense		
1978–1979	Ramonense		
1979–1981	Saprissa		
1983	Municipal Puntarenas		
1983–1984	Sagrada Familia		
1985–1986	San Carlos		
1986–1987	Limonense		
1987–1988	Guanacasteca		
1988–1989	Ramonense		
- Universidad

Managerial career
- 1989–1990: Costa Rica (assistant)
- 1992: Limonense
- 1996–1998: Puntarenas
- 1998: Nigeria (assistant)
- 2000–2001: Alajuelense (assistant)
- 2001: Alajuelense (caretaker)
- 2002: Costa Rica (assistant)
- 2004: Costa Rica U23
- 2006–2008: Guatemala U23
- 2008–2009: Costa Rica
- * Club domestic league appearances and goals

Rodrigo Kenton Johnson (born March 5, 1955) is a Costa Rican football coach and former player. He is known as La Bomba Kenton ("The Kenton Bomb").

== Playing career ==
Kenton started his playing career in Costa Rica's first division, playing for his hometown team, Limonense. He then went on to play for several teams, such as Deportivo Saprissa, Ramonense, Municipal Puntarenas, Sagrada Familia, Guanacasteca and San Carlos.

== Coaching career ==
Kenton retired from professional football in 1989, and began a very successful and international coaching career. His first coaching job was as assistant coach to Bora Milutinovic in the Costa Rica's national squad that played the 1990 World Cup held in Italy, where Costa Rica had a great performance and reached the second round, against all odds.

In Costa Rica, he has had short coaching periods at Costa Rica's first division, with Herediano and Alajuelense during the mid-1990s, but neither team gave him enough time to build his ideas and process. So, he went back to international football and in 1998, he was asked by Milutinovic to be his assistant coach again, this time with the Nigeria national football team that played the 1998 World Cup that took place in France. After completing the Nigeria job, he returned to take charge of Puntarenas only to be dismissed in October 1998.

By the early 2000s, he took charge of the Costa Rica U23 team, and qualified them to the 2004 Summer Olympics held in Athens. Again, his team had a great performance and reached the Quarterfinals, eliminating favorites such as Portugal. He was then selected by FIFA to be part of the international official Technical Study Group for the Germany 2006 World Cup, along worldwide renowned football experts and coaches such as Francisco Maturana, Roger Milla, Andy Roxburgh, Teófilo Cubillas, Jozef Venglos, and others.

In 2006, Kenton was named coach of the Guatemala national team U-23, with the goal to classify Guatemala to the 2008 Olympic Games, but failed to accomplish it.

=== Costa Rica national team ===
In late June 2008, after Hernán Medford was removed from his position as head coach of the Costa Rica national team, Eduardo Lee, president of the Fedefubol (Federacion Costarricense de Futbol) and the board of executives chose Rodrigo Kenton as head coach of the Costa Rica national team, to qualify for the South Africa 2010. The announcement was made unofficially by Kenton in an interview by Radio Monumental's journalist Harrick McClean, when Fedefutbol had scheduled a press conference a week after Hernan Medford was removed.

Kenton was named head coach with less than two months to the start of the 1st group phase of the CONCACAF qualifiers for South Africa 2010. The group included Suriname, El Salvador and Haiti. His first official match was a 1-0 win over El Salvador after an Alvaro Saborio penalty. With Kenton, Costa Rica also beat Haiti and Suriname. He was fired 15 September 2009 after the team lost three World Cup qualifying matches in a row.

== Personal life ==
He is married to Floribel Fadell Cartín and they have three sons: Keiner, Derrick and Kervin.
