= Milanovac =

Milanovac may refer to:

- Milanovac, Žagubica, a village in Braničevo, Serbia
- Milanovac, Virovitica, a village near the city of Virovitica, Croatia
- Milanovac, Crnac, a village near Crnac, Virovitica-Podravina County, Croatia
- Milanovac, Požega-Slavonia County, a village near Velika, Croatia
- Gornji Milanovac, a town in central Serbia
- Donji Milanovac, a town in eastern Serbia
- Novi Milanovac, a village in central Serbia
