= Milojko =

Milojko (Serbian Cyrillic: Милојко) is a Serbian and Montenegrin masculine given name. Notable people with the name include:

- Milojko Grujić (born 1944), Serbian politician
- Milojko Lešjanin (1830–1896), Serbian military officer and politician
- Milojko Spajić (born 1987), Montenegrin politician
- Milojko Vasilić (born 1989), Serbian basketball player
