= Milisav =

Milisav (Serbian Cyrillic: Милисав), is a Slavic masculine given name. Notable people with the name include:

- Milisav Čamdžija (1770s–1815), Serbian revolutionary
- Milisav Đorđević (d. 1832), Serbian revolutionary
- Milisav Koljenšić (1912–1963), Montenegrin major general
- Milisav Petronijević (born 1949), Serbian politician
- Milisav Popović (born 1978), Montenegrin author
- Milisav Savić (born 1945), Serbian writer and novelist
- Milisav Sećković (born 1973), Montenegrin footballer

== See also ==
- Milisavljević
- Milosav
