= Miljenko =

Miljenko is a masculine given name found in Croatia and Bosnia.

Notable people with the name include:

- Miljenko Grgic (1923–2023), Croatian American winemaker in California
- Miljenko Horvat (1935–2012), artist, architect, author and illustrator from Croatia
- Miljenko Hrkać (1947–1978), Croatian terrorist sentenced to death by a Yugoslav court
- Miljenko Jergović (born 1966), Bosnian Croat writer
- Miljenko Kovačić (1973–2005), Croatian soccer player
- Miljenko Licul (1946–2009), Slovenian graphic designer of Croatian descent
- Miljenko Matijevic (born 1964), Croatian-American singer and songwriter
- Miljenko Mihić (1933–2009), Bosnian Serb football coach
- Miljenko Mumlek (born 1972), Croatian former footballer
- Miljenko Prohaska (1925–2014), Croatian composer, music arranger and orchestral conductor
- Miljenko Rak (born 1947), Croatian former long-jumper and fitness trainer
- Miljenko Smoje (1923–1995), Croatian writer and journalist
- Miljenko Stančić (1926–1977), Croatian painter and graphic artist

== See also ==
- Milenko
- Miljko
