= Miladinović =

Miladinović (Serbian Cyrillic: Миладиновић, pronounced [miladǐːnoʋitɕ]) is a Serbian patronymic surname derived from a masculine given name Miladin. It may refer to:

- Bojan Miladinović (born 1982), footballer
- David Miladinović (born 1997), basketball player
- Dejan Miladinović (1948 – 2017), opera director
- Igor Miladinović (born 1974), chess grandmaster
- Igor Miladinović (born 1989), footballer
- Ivan Miladinović (born 1994), footballer
- Jovan Miladinović (1939 – 1982), footballer
- Marko Miladinović (born 2000), tennis player
