= Milović =

Milović (Serbian Cyrillic: Миловић) is a patronymic surname derived from a masculine given name Milo. Notable people with the surname include:

- Antun Milović (1934–2008), Croatian politician
- Goran Milović (born 1989), Croatian footballer
- Milovan Milović (born 1980), Serbian footballer
- Zoran Milović (born 1977), Serbian basketball player
- Željko Milović (born 1968), Montenegrin writer

== See also ==
- Milić
- Milanović
