= Milisavljević =

Milisavljević (Serbian: Милисављевић) is a Serbian surname, a patronymic derived from the Slavic masculine given name Milisav. It may refer to:

- Branko Milisavljević (born 1976) Serbian basketball player
- Dan Milisavljevic (born 1980), Canadian astronomer
- Nemanja Milisavljević. (born 1984) Serbian footballer

== See also ==
- Milosavljević
