= Miletić =

Miletić (Serbian Cyrillic: Милетић, pronounced [mǐletitɕ]; plural: Miletići, Милетићи) is a Bosnian, Croatian, and Serbian surname, and is one of the common surnames in Bosnia and Herzegovina, Croatia and Serbia.

It derives from personal name Mileta, cognate of the English name Milius. The suffix ić is a diminutive designation, or descendant designation. Thus the last name can be translated as Mileta's son.

There are several families in Bosnia and Herzegovina, Croatia, Montenegro and Serbia who carry this last name. The most numerous and the most prominent of the Miletići are found in Bosnia and Herzegovina, and in Croatia.

It is one of the most common surnames in two counties of Croatia.

People with last name Miletić:

- Boris Miletić (born 1975), Croatian politician and mayor of Pula
- Branko Miletić, Yugoslav linguist, professor of University of Belgrade (cs:Branko Miletić)
- Dušan Miletić (born 1998), Serbian basketball player
- Lyubomir Miletich (1863–1937), Bulgarian linguist, ethnographer, dialectologist and historian, brother of Svetozar Miletić
- Marinko Miletić (born 1980), German football player of Croatian origin currently playing for Rot-Weiß Oberhausen
- Miloje Miletić (born 1953), Lt. General, Chief-of-staff of the Serbian Armed Forces
- Minja Miletić (born 1980), Serbian journalist and television presenter
- Miroslav Miletić (1925–2018), Croatian composer and viola player
- Nemanja Miletić (footballer, born January 1991), Serbian footballer
- Nemanja Miletić (footballer, born July 1991), Serbian footballer
- Oktavijan Miletić (1902–1987), Croatian cinematographer and Film director
- Pat Miletić (born 1966), Croatian mixed martial artist (MMA), known as The Croatian Sensation
- Predrag Miletić (born 1952), Serbian film, television, and theatre actor
- Predrag Miletić (basketball) (born 1984), Serbian basketball player
- Slavomir Miletić (1930–2022), Yugoslav sculptor from Bosnia and Herzegovina, now living in the Netherlands
- Slobodan Miletić (born 1969), Serbian footballer
- Stjepan Miletić (1868–1908), Croatian playwright, director, critic, and writer
- Svetozar Miletić (1826–1901), an advocate, politician, mayor of Novi Sad, and the political leader of Serbs in Vojvodina

Places named Miletić:

- Miletići in Bosnia and Herzegovina
- Srpski Miletić in Serbia
- Miletićevo in Serbia
