= Milko =

Milko may refer to:

- Milkó, a commune in Vrancea County, Romania
- Milko (name), a South Slavic masculine given name (includes a list of people with the name)
- Milko (Swedish cooperative), Sweden's largest native producer of dairy products
- Somebody who operated a milk run

== See also ==
- Milkor, a South African company
- Miłków (disambiguation)
