= Milojević =

Milojević (Serbian Cyrillic: Милојевић, pronounced [mǐlojeʋitɕ, milǒː-]) is a Serbian surname derived from a masculine given name Miloje. Notable people with the surname include:

- Aleksa Milojević (born 2000), Serbian footballer
- Dejan Milojević (1977–2024), Serbian basketball player
- Goran Milojević (born 1964), Serbian football midfielder
- Ljubiša Milojević (born 1967), Serbian football player
- Miloje Milojević (1884–1946), Serbian composer, conductor, pianist, pedagogue, music critic, and musical writer
- Miloš Milojević (lawyer) (1840–1897), Serbian lawyer, writer and politician
- Miloš Milojević (footballer) (born 1982), Serbian footballer and manager
- Nemanja Milojević (born 1998), Greek-Serbian footballer
- Nikola Milojević (footballer) (born 1981), Serbian football goalkeeper
- Nikola Milojević (born 1995), Serbian tennis player
- Vladan Milojević (born 1970), Serbian footballer and manager
- Zvonko Milojević (born 1971), Serbian football player
