= Miłków =

Miłków may refer to the following places in Poland:

- Miłków, Lower Silesian Voivodeship (south-west Poland)
- Miłków, Świętokrzyskie Voivodeship (south-central Poland)
- Miłków, Lublin Voivodeship (east Poland)

== See also ==
- Milko (disambiguation)
