= Miladin =

Miladin (Serbian Cyrillic: Миладин, pronounced [milǎdin]) is a masculine given name. It may refer to:

- Miladin Bečanović (born 1973), footballer
- Miladin Kozlina (born 1983), handball player
- Miladin Peković (born 1983), basketball player
- Miladin Pešterac (1960–2007), footballer
- Miladin Popović (1910–1945), politician
- Miladin "Dado" Pršo (born 1974), retired footballer
- Miladin Stevanović (born 1996), footballer
- Miladin Šobić (born 1956), singer
- Miladin Zarić (1889–1976), teacher and soldier

== See also ==
- Miladinović
- Miladinovtsi
- Miladinovci
