= Milan Toman =

Czech ice hockey player

- Born: November 30, 1979 (age 45); Litoměřice, Czechoslovakia
- Height: 5 ft 7 in (170 cm)
- Weight: 198 lb (90 kg; 14 st 2 lb)
- Position: Defence
- Shot: Left
- Played for: HC Sparta Praha; HC Slovan Ústí nad Labem; SK Kadaň; HC Kladno; HC Znojemští Orli; HC Mountfield; HC Stadion Litoměřice; BK Mladá Boleslav; Piráti Chomutov; HC Roudnice nad Labem
- Playing career: 1998–2022

Milan Toman (born November 30, 1979) is a Czech professional ice hockey defenceman. He played with HC Kladno in the Czech Extraliga during the 2010–11 Czech Extraliga season. He has played with BK Mladá Boleslav since 2012.

== Career statistics ==
			Regular season					Playoffs
Season	Team	League	GP	G	A	Pts	PIM	GP	G	A	Pts	PIM
1994–95	TJ Kladno U18	Czech U18	38	9	30	39	—	—	—	—	—	—
1995–96	Rytiri Kladno U18	Czech U18	33	15	33	48	—	—	—	—	—	—
1996–97	HC Kladno U20	Czech U20	18	3	3	6	—	—	—	—	—	—
1997–98	HC Sparta Praha U20	Czech U20	34	11	22	33	—	2	1	0	1	—
1997–98	HC Sparta Praha	Czech	2	0	1	1	2	2	0	0	0	2
1998–99	HC Sparta Praha U20	Czech U20	28	7	15	22	—	—	—	—	—	—
1999–00	HC Sparta Praha U20	Czech U20	7	1	1	2	6	—	—	—	—	—
1999–00	HC Slovan Ústí nad Labem	Czech3	38	3	7	10	64	6	1	7	8	8
2000–01	HC Slovan Ústí nad Labem	Czech2	35	2	5	7	48	—	—	—	—	—
2000–01	SK Kadaň	Czech2	15	0	6	6	22	—	—	—	—	—
2001–02	HC Kladno	Czech	11	0	2	2	10	—	—	—	—	—
2001–02	HC Slovan Ústí nad Labem	Czech2	34	3	12	15	81	5	1	2	3	6
2002–03	HC Znojemští Orli	Czech	49	6	16	22	90	6	0	2	2	16
2003–04	HC Znojemští Orli	Czech	22	1	4	5	54	7	0	0	0	14
2004–05	HC Znojemští Orli	Czech	46	2	16	18	72	—	—	—	—	—
2005–06	HC Sparta Praha	Czech	49	3	3	6	68	9	0	0	0	4
2006–07	HC Mountfield	Czech	50	5	9	14	54	11	1	1	2	24
2007–08	HC Mountfield	Czech	50	7	17	24	84	12	2	4	6	18
2008–09	HC Mountfield	Czech	44	7	15	22	66	—	—	—	—	—
2009–10	HC Kladno	Czech	38	3	10	13	52	—	—	—	—	—
2010–11	HC Kladno	Czech	44	2	20	22	68	—	—	—	—	—
2011–12	Rytíři Kladno	Czech	40	2	8	10	52	1	0	0	0	2
2012–13	HC Mountfield	Czech	4	0	1	1	10	—	—	—	—	—
2012–13	HC Stadion Litoměřice	Czech2	12	0	2	2	44	—	—	—	—	—
2012–13	BK Mladá Boleslav	Czech2	39	5	19	24	50	10	1	3	4	24
2013–14	BK Mladá Boleslav	Czech2	41	2	29	31	84	10	2	5	7	37
2014–15	BK Mladá Boleslav	Czech	2	0	0	0	2	—	—	—	—	—
2014–15	Piráti Chomutov	Czech2	22	1	6	7	52	11	1	4	5	32
2015–16	HC Stadion Litoměřice	Czech2	18	2	7	9	16	3	0	0	0	4
2015–16	HC Roudnice nad Labem	Czech4	—	—	—	—	—	—	—	—	—	—
2019–20	HC Roudnice nad Labem	Czech4	6	1	1	2	8	1	0	0	0	0
2021–22	HC Roudnice nad Labem	Czech4	1	0	0	0	2	—	—	—	—	—
Czech totals			451	38	122	160	684	48	3	7	10	80
Czech2 totals			216	15	86	101	397	39	5	14	19	103
