= Milivojević =

Milivojević (Serbian Cyrillic: Миливојевић, pronounced [miliʋǒːjeʋitɕ]) is a Serbian patronymic surname derived from a masculine given name Milivoj or Milivoje. Notable people with the surname include:

- Alessio Milivojevic (born 2005), American football player
- Boris Milivojević, Serbian actor
- Dionisije Milivojević (1898–1979), Serbian Orthodox bishop
- Dragan Milivojević, Croatian actor
- Luka Milivojević (born 1991), footballer
- Marko Milivojević, musician
- Dragan Milivojević, Croatian actor
- Srđan Milivojević, Serbian politician
- Vesna Milivojević (born 2001), Association football player
