= Ksenija Milenković =

Serbian diplomat (born 1975)

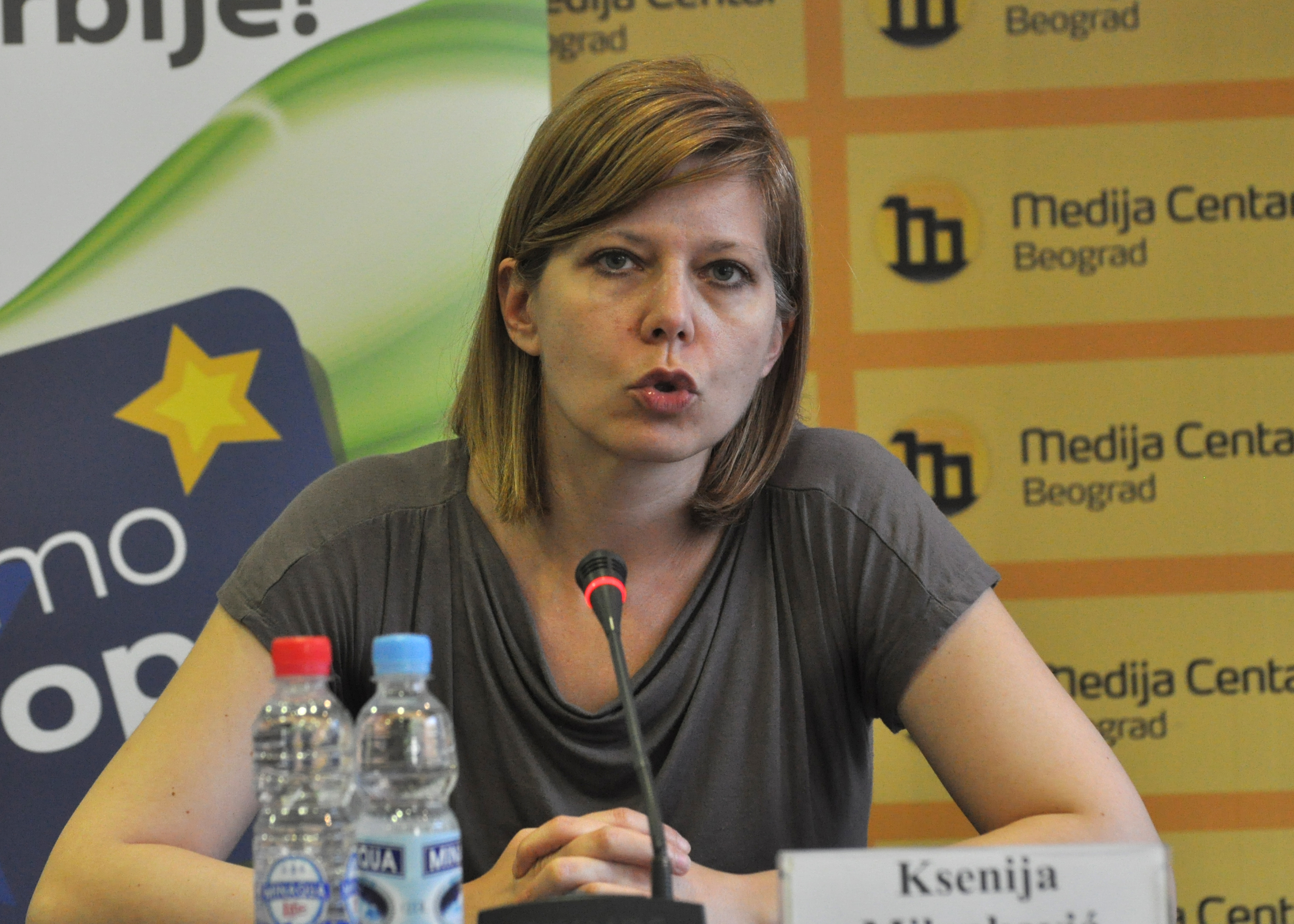
- Ksenija Milenković in 2015

Serbian Ambassador to the Netherlands
- Incumbent
- Assumed office designated: December 2019

Personal details
- Born: 5 April 1975 (age 51) Belgrade
- Education: University of Belgrade Faculty of Law

Ksenija Milenković (born 5 April 1975 in Belgrade) is a Serbian politician and diplomat. She serves as the Ambassador of Serbia to the Netherlands since December 2019. until December 2024.

== Life ==
Ksenija Milenković studied law at the Faculty of Law, University of Belgrade.

From 2004 to 2006, she was a member of the National Assembly and led the European Integration Committee. She was spokesperson for the political party G17 plus.

She worked as the deputy head of the mission of the Republic of Serbia to the European Union from 2011 to 2015.

In 2015, she is named acting director of the European integration office.

From 2017 to 2019, she was the Assistant Minister of the Ministry of European Integration.
