= Milius =

Milius may refer to:

- USS Milius (DDG-69), missile destroyer of the United States Navy
- Pope Avilius of Alexandria, also known as Milius, Patriarch of Alexandria between 83 and 95

== People with the surname ==
- Jeronimas Milius (born 1984), Lithuanian singer
- John Milius (born 1944), American screenwriter and director

== Film ==
- Milius (film), a 2013 documentary about the filmmaker
