= Bibic =

Bibic is a surname. Notable people with the surname include:

- Almen Bibic (born 1993), Swedish ice hockey player
- Bratko Bibič (born 1957), Slovene accordionist
- Dylan Bibic (born 2003), Canadian cyclist
- Elzan Bibić (born 1999), Serbian runner
- Mirko Bibic (born 1960s), Canadian businessman
- Polde Bibič (1933–2012), Slovene actor

== See also ==
- bibic (charity), a UK children's charitable organization founded in 1972
