= Gutić =

Gutić is a Serbian and Croatian surname. It may refer to:

- Viktor Gutić, Ustaše commissioner
- Mirko Gutić, Yugoslav author
- Ismar Gutić, Bosnian politician
- Jovan Gutić, leader of the Herzegovina Uprising (1875–78)
- Ante Gutić, mayor of Civljane, Croatia
