= Antunovac, Velika =

Settlement in Požega-Slavonia County, Croatia

Antunovac
- settlement
- Interactive map of Antunovac
- Location within Croatia
- Coordinates: 45°24′47″N 17°37′37″E
- Country: Croatia
- County: Požega-Slavonia
- Municipality: Velika

Area
  - Total: 5.2 km^{2} (2.0 sq mi)

Population (2021)
  - Total: 103
  - Density: 20/km^{2} (51/sq mi)
- Time zone: UTC+1 (CET)
  - Summer (DST): UTC+2 (CEST)
- Postal code: 34000 Požega
- Area code: +385 (0)34

Antunovac is a settlement in the Municipality of Velika in Croatia. In 2021, its population was 103.

== Demographics ==
Antunovac: Population trends 1857–2021
v

population								242	347	314	308	283	253	212	220	158	103
	1857	1869	1880	1890	1900	1910	1921	1931	1948	1953	1961	1971	1981	1991	2001	2011	2021

Sources: Croatian Bureau of Statistics publications
