= Gordana Milenković =

Serbian politician

Gordana Milenković (Serbian Cyrillic: Гордана Миленковић; born 1966) is a politician in Serbia. She served in the Assembly of Vojvodina from 2020 to 2021 and is currently a member of the Kula municipal assembly. Milenković is a member of Serbian Progressive Party.

== Private career ==
Milenković identifies as an entrepreneur. She lives in Crvenka in Kula.

== Politician ==
=== Municipal politics ===
Milenković received the third position on the Progressive Party's electoral list for the 2016 local elections in Kula and was elected when the list won a narrow majority victory with nineteen out of thirty-seven mandates. The municipality subsequently experienced a period of political upheaval, and a new election was held in late 2018. Milenković received the ninth position on the Progressive list and was re-elected when it won an increased majority with twenty-six mandates.

=== Provincial politics ===
Milenković was given the forty-fourth position on the Progressive Party's Aleksandar Vučić — For Our Children list in the 2020 provincial election and was elected when the list won a majority victory with seventy-six out of 120 mandates. During her term in the assembly, she was a member of the committee on security and the committee on petitions and motions. She resigned her mandate in 2021; her resignation became official on 19 April.
