= Minja Miletić =

Serbian journalist, television producer and presenter

- Миња Милетић
- Born: 26 June 1980 (age 45); Belgrade, SFR Yugoslavia
- Education: Faculty of Medicine
- Alma mater: University of Belgrade
- Occupations: Journalist, tv producer and presenter
- Years active: 2000–present

Minja Miletić (Serbian: Миња Милетић, born 26 June 1980) is a Serbian journalist, television producer and presenter. She is the Talk-show presenter for “Directly with Minja Miletić” (“Direktno sa Minjom Miletić”), which is broadcast on Euronews Srbija (Serbia).

== Early life and education ==
She was born on 26 June 1980 in Belgrade, SFR Yugoslavia. She graduated from Belgrade's XIV Grammar School and later graduated from the University of Belgrade Faculty of Medicine in 2007. However, after these studies she shifted her focus from medicine to journalism.

== Professional career ==
She began her career in 2001 as a journalist for the third television channel of Radio Television of Serbia. She later switched to several media houses and from 2007 was a television presenter for Yu Info channel, RTV Studio B, RTV Politika, TV Košava and Fox TV station.

From 2010 to 2014, she worked along with Vladimir Stanojević as a television presenter for RTV Pink, on the programme "Good Morning: Minja and Vlada" (“Добро јутро: Миња и Влада"). She also worked as chief editor of the weekly edition of the morning show “Jutarnji program” on RTV Pink.

In 2014, she became chief editor and host of the morning show "Novi Dan" on the N1.

In July 2021, she joined Euronews Serbia and hosts as Talk-show presenter for her own current affairs programme “Directly with Minja Miletić” (“Direktno sa Minjom Miletić”) which was broadcast for the first time on 1 October 2021.

== Awards ==
In 2013 she was awarded with the XXII Fashion Selection The Most Stylized public person Award. In November 2017 she was awarded with the Elle Award for TV personality of the year.

== Personal life ==
Minja Miletić has always tried to keep her personal life private. Miletić has a sister Aleksandra Miletić, who is married with the Serbian footballer Novak Martinović. Her former partner was the Serbian Progressive Party politician Branislav Prostran until 2012.

== Legal dispute ==
In November 2022, a criminal complaint for insult was filed in a Serbian court against Euronews Serbia TV journalist Minja Miletić by Vladan Zagradjanin, an associate of the Minister of Foreign Affairs in the Serbian Government. The lawsuit concerned comments made by Miletić during the programme “Directly with Minja Miletic”, which was aired on Euronews Srbija (Serbia) on 10 November 2022 and have been considered offensive by Zagradjanin.

On 24 November 2022, Miletić stated during the news programme that “seeking answers and ultimately the truth from the guests may sometimes seem uncomfortable. I believe this is a small price to pay for media freedom. Freedom of speech is one of the fundamental pillars of democracy”.

Euronews Srbija made an announcement in support of Miletić pointing out that they are "an independent news TV channel" and that "journalists must be allowed to do their jobs and report without fear and impartiality." Euronews headquarters in Lyon also issued statements regarding the lawsuit for insult.

The owner of "Arena channel" television, which is part of Telekom Srbija, came to the defense of the journalist. As stated by the company, as they aim to position themselves as a leader in the field of multimedia content, they choose only the most respectable media houses, such as Euronews, for their partners. “That's why we want to give full support to Euronews and their journalist, because we firmly believe that journalists should have unhindered freedom of objective reporting and do their work without pressure or threats of legal sanctions”, the statement said.
