= Milivoj =

- Gender: male

Origin
- Origin: Slavic
- Meaning: mil- ("gracius, favour") + -voj ("soldier, war")

Other names
- Alternative spelling: Milivoje
- Nickname: Milo
- Related names: Wojciech

Milivoj (Serbian: Миливој) is an old Slavic masculine given name. It is a Slavic dithematic name derived from stems mil- ("gracius, favour") + -voj ("soldier, war"). Notable people with the name include:

- Milivoj Ašner (1913–2011), Croatian police chief and war criminal
- Milivoj Bebić (born 1959), Croatian water polo player
- Milivoj Bračun (born 1958), a Croatian football manager
- Milivoj Dukić (born 1993), Montenegrin sailor
- Milivoj Jugin (1925–2013), Serbian aeronautical engineer, constructor, publicist and popularizer of science
- Milivoj Karakašević (1948–2022), Serbian table tennis player
- Milivoj Krmar (born 1997), Serbian footballer
- Milivoj Lajovic (1921–2008), an Australian politician of Slovene origin
- Milivoj Petković (born 1949), a Bosnian-Croat army officer
- Milivoj Radović (1915–1987), a Yugoslav Olympic fencer
- Milivoj Solar (born 1936), a Croatian literary theoretician, literary historian, essayist and a university professor
- Milivoj Uzelac (1897–1977), Croatian artist

== See also ==
- Milivoje
- Milivojević
- Milivojevci
