= Velika, Croatia =

- Municipality
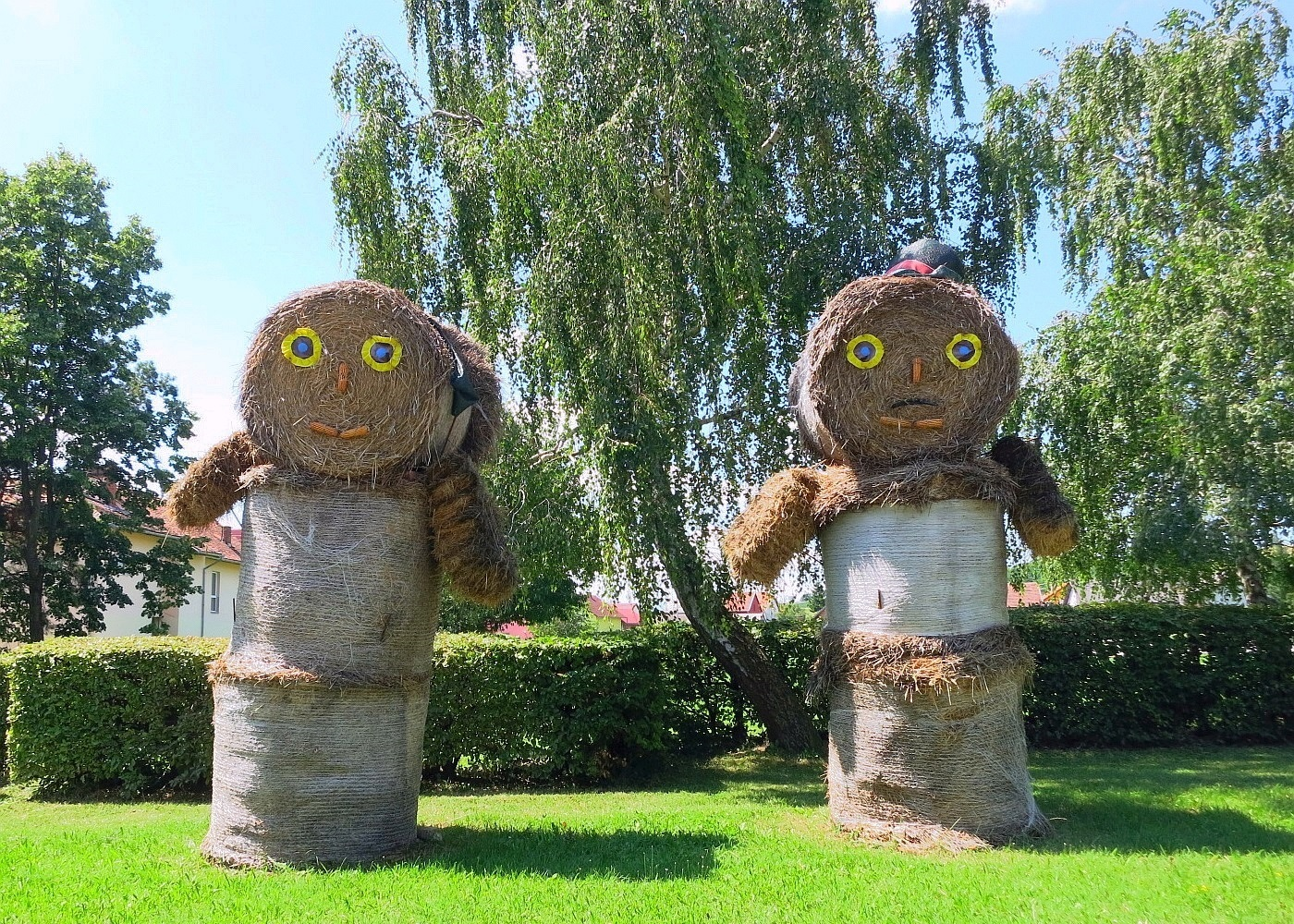

- Location of Velika in Croatia
- Coordinates: 45.45°N 17.665°E
- Country: Croatia
- Region: Slavonia (Požega Valley)
- County: Požega-Slavonia County

Area
  - Municipality: 154.9 km^{2} (59.8 sq mi)
  - Urban: 29.6 km^{2} (11.4 sq mi)

Population (2021)
  - Municipality: 4,502
  - Density: 29.06/km^{2} (75.28/sq mi)
  - Urban: 1,650
  - Urban density: 55.7/km^{2} (144/sq mi)
- Time zone: UTC+1 (Central European Time)
- Website: opcina-velika.hr

Velika is a village and a municipality in the Požega Valley in Slavonia.

== Geography ==
It is located on the southern slopes of Papuk Mountain 12 km north of Požega, in the Požega-Slavonia County, with the elevation of 278 m.

Velika is located on the Požega - Slatina county road and Velika - Požega - Pleternica railway.

== Economy ==
Chief occupations include farming, viticulture and tourism (recreational centre).

== Demographics ==
There are a total of 5,607 people in the municipality (census 2011), in the following settlements:

- Antunovac, population 158
- Biškupci, population 354
- Bratuljevci, population 25
- Doljanci, population 84
- Draga, population 275
- Gornji Vrhovci, population 10
- Kantrovci, population 34
- Klisa, population 0
- Lučinci, population 53
- Markovac, population 1
- Milanovac, population 45
- Milivojevci, population 17
- Nježić, population 1
- Oljasi, population 63
- Ozdakovci, population 5
- Poljanska, population 96
- Potočani, population 182
- Radovanci, population 483
- Smoljanovci, population 3
- Stražeman, population 231
- Toranj, population 173
- Trenkovo, population 799
- Trnovac, population 398
- Velika, population 2,117

In the same census, 95% of the population were Croats. Ethnic minorities in the municipality include the Serbs (220) and to a lesser extent people of Czech, Hungarian, German and Slovenian descent.

Colonist settlement of Požeški Aleksandrovac (later renamed Antunovac) was established on the territory of the village municipality during the land reform in interwar Yugoslavia.

== Politics ==
=== Minority councils ===
Directly elected minority councils and representatives are tasked with consulting tasks for the local or regional authorities in which they are advocating for minority rights and interests, integration into public life and participation in the management of local affairs. At the 2023 Croatian national minorities councils and representatives elections Serbs of Croatia fulfilled legal requirements to elect 10 members minority council of the Municipality of Velika with 8 members being elected in the end.

== History ==
It was ruled by Ottoman Empire between 1532 and 1687 and again between 1690 and 1691 as part of Sanjak of Pojega before Austrian conquest.fy
