= Milka Loff Fernandes =

German TV presenter and actress

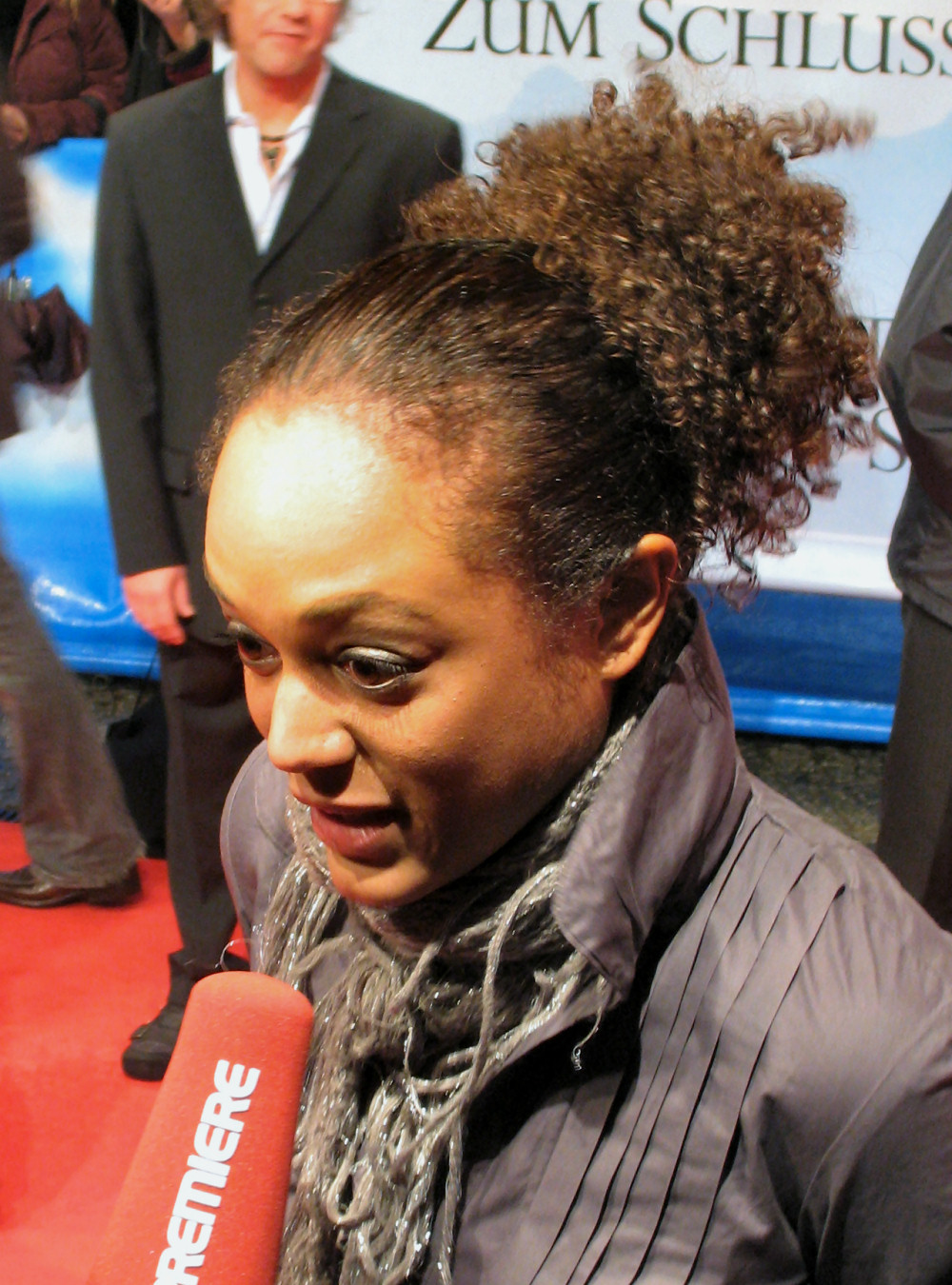
- Fernandes at the premiere of The Bucket List in Berlin
- Born: 19 June 1980 (age 44); Hamburg, West Germany

Milka Loff Fernandes (born 19 June 1980 in Hamburg) is a German TV presenter and actress of Cape Verdean descent.

Fernandes was, from 1999 until 2004, VJ for the television channel Viva and in 2002 recorded the song Girl for a day with Band Ohne Namen, reaching Number 16 in the German music charts.

Fernandes has also played roles in the television crime series Tatort, Rosa Roth and the short film Traum(a). Her parents come from the Cape Verde islands, and she is a practising Buddhist, now living in Düsseldorf. She has also appeared twice in the German celebrity version of Come Dine with Me.
