= Milutinović =

Milutinović (Serbian: Милутиновић) is a Serbo-Croatian surname, a patronymic derived from Milutin. It may refer to:

- Andreja Milutinović (born 1990), Serbian basketball player.
- Bora Milutinović (born 1944), Serbian football coach.
- Ivan Milutinović (1901–1944), Serbian Partisan.
- Ivica Milutinović (born 1983), Serbian footballer.
- Lazar Milutinović (born 1998), Serbian footballer.
- Maja Milutinović (born 1987), Montenegrin basketballer.
- Milan Milutinović (1942–2023), former President of Serbia.
- Milan Milutinović (footballer) (born 1983), Serbian footballer.
- Milorad Milutinović (1935–2015), Yugoslav Serbian footballer.
- Miloš Milutinović (1933–2003), Yugoslav Serbian footballer and coach.
- Miroslav Milutinović (born 1985), Serbian footballer.
- Sima Milutinović Sarajlija (1791–1847), Serbian intellectual and diplomat.
- Sima Milutinović (1899–1981), Yugoslav mechanical engineer and a professor.
- Zdravko Milutinović (born 1951), retired Yugoslav sports shooter.
- Zoran Milutinović (born 1988), Bosnian footballer.
