= Miomir =

Miomir (Serbian Cyrillic: Миомир) is a Serbo-Croatian masculine given name of Slavic origin. Notable people with the name include:

- Miomir Mugoša (born 1955), Montenegrin politician
- Miomir Vukobratović (1931–2012), Serbian inventor
- Miomir Žužul (born 1955), Croatian politician
- Miomir Kecmanović (born 1999), Serbian tennis player
- Miomir Petrović, member of rock group Siluete

== See also ==
- Milomir
