= Gegić =

- Language: Serbo-Croatian

Origin
- Language: Albanian
- Meaning: Ghegs

Gegić (Serbian Cyrillic: Гегић) is a Serbian, Bosniak and Croatian surname that is derived from Albanian ethnic subgroup of Ghegs.

== Notable people ==
- Abdulah Gegić (1924–2008), Yugoslav football coach who also had Turkish citizenship
- Almir Gegić (born 1979), Serbian Bosniak football player
- Amar Gegić, Bosnian professional basketball player
- Bajro Gegić, Serbian Bosniak politician
- Miroslav Gegić, Serbian football defender
- Šemsudin Gegić, Bosniak literate, playwright, theater, TV and film director
