= Aleksandar Milenković (footballer) =

Austrian-Serbian footballer

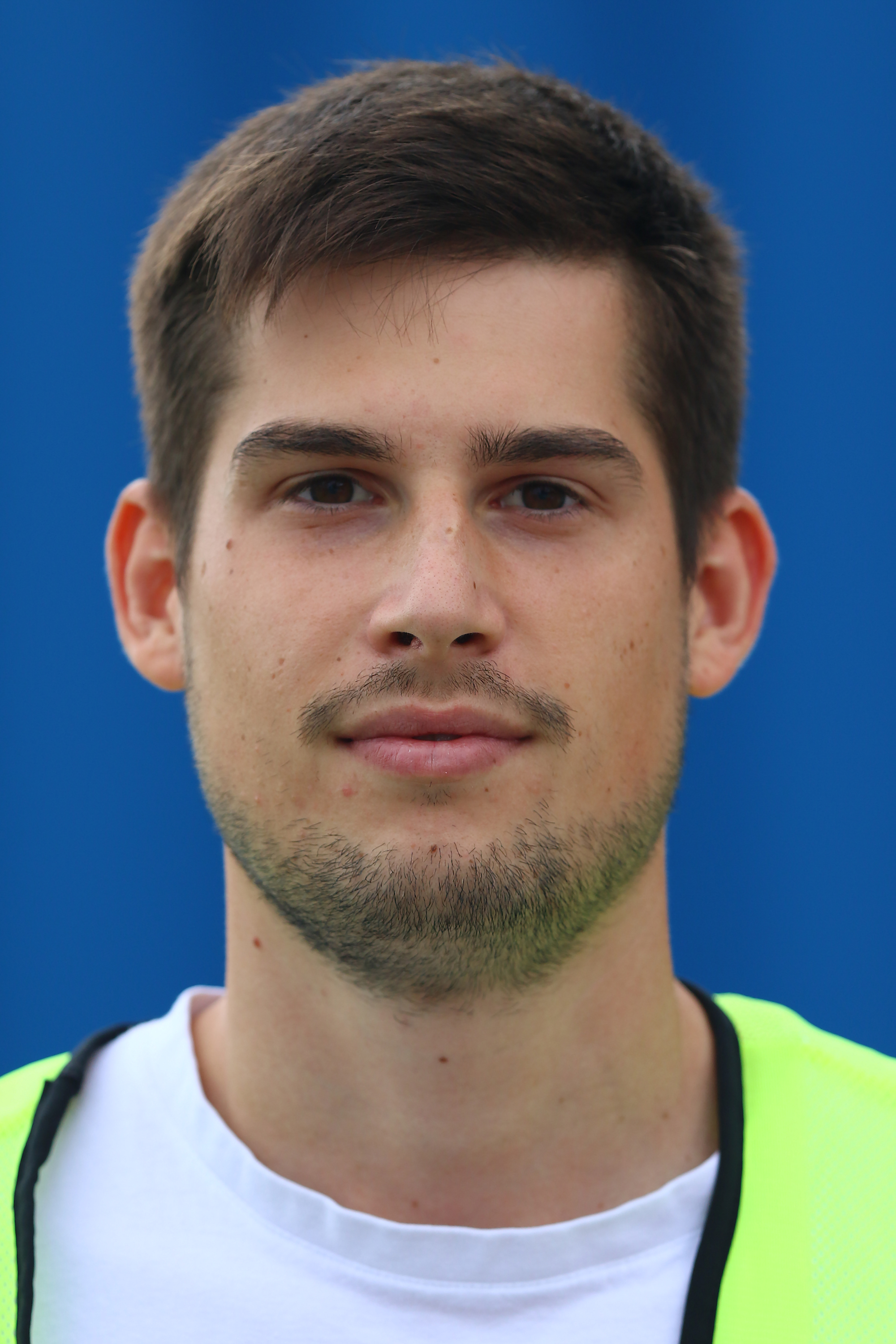
- Milenković in 2019

Personal information
- Date of birth: 14 March 1994 (age 32)
- Place of birth: Wien, Austria
- Height: 1.86 m (6 ft 1 in)
- Position: Centre-back

Youth career
- 2001–2009: Rapid Wien
- 2009–2012: Wiener SC
- 2012: Admira Wacker

Senior career*
Years	Team	Apps	(Gls)
2012–2014	Admira Wacker	6	(0)
2014	Wiener Viktoria	14	(0)
2014–2017	FAC	54	(0)
2018	Mauerwerk	3	(0)
2019	FC Stadlau	11	(0)
2019–2021	Team Wiener Linien	24	(0)
2021–2022	TWL Elektra	19	(1)
- * Club domestic league appearances and goals as of 21:44, 7 March 2023 (UTC)

Aleksandar Milenković (born 14 March 1994) is an Austrian/Serbian footballer who currently plays as a centre-back.
