= Tošić =

Tošić (Serbian Cyrillic: Тошић, pronounced [tôʃitɕ, tǒː-]) is a Serbian and Croatian surname which is more common among Serbs than Croats.

Notable people with this name include:

- Aleksandar Tošić (born 1970), Serbian racing driver
- Dragomir Tošić (1909–1985), Yugoslavian footballer and civil engineer
- Duško Tošić (born 1985), Serbian footballer
- Goran Tošić (born 1982), Serbian tennis player
- Jelena Kostanić Tošić (born 1981), Croatian retired tennis player
- Luka Tošić (born 1988), Slovenian ice hockey player
- Rade Tošić (born 1965), former Bosnian Serb football player
- Roko Tošić (born 1979), Croatian table tennis player
- Vladimir Tošić (born 1949), Serbian composer and visual artist
- Zoran Tošić (born 1987), Serbian footballer
