= Milka (given name) =

Milka is a feminine given name found in Bulgaria, Slovenia, Croatia, Bosnia, Serbia and Montenegro. Notable people with the name are as follows:

- Milka Babović (1928–2020), Croatian runner and journalist
- Milka Canić (1944–2016), Serbian quiz show host
- Milka Chulina (born 1974), Venezuelan model of Croatian descent
- Milka Duno (born 1972), Venezuelan race car driver
- Milka Eftimova (1936–2025), Macedonian opera singer
- Milka Hartman (1902-1997), Slovenian poet
- Milka Loff Fernandes (born 1980), German TV presenter and actress
- Milka Mesić (1939-2024), First Lady of Croatia
- Milka Planinc (1924–2010), Croatian Yugoslav politician
- Milka Podrug-Kokotović (1930–2025), Croatian actress
- Milka Stojanovic (1937–2023), Serbian opera singer
- Milka Tadić, Montenegrin political activist
- Milka Ternina (1863–1941), Croatian dramatic soprano

== See also ==
- Milena (given name)
- Milcah, Hebrew name מִלְכָּה (meaning "queen" or "ruler")
- Malka, Hebrew name
- Milka – A Film About Taboos, a 1980 Finnish film
- Milko (name)
