= Milko Foucault-Larche =

Milko Foucault-Larche (/ˌfuːkoʊˈlɑːrʃeɪ/ FOO-koh-LAR-shay; born 1 June 1960) is a Mauritian Australian entertainer. He is best known in Australia for his tribute to Charles Aznavour, "Aznavour... From Today".

He made his stage debut in 1978 working with a French Theatre Company touring Mauritius. During his first theatrical season, Milko played a small part in the world premiere of Mauritian Operetta Surcouf, performed at the Port Louis Municipal Theatre with French tenor Jose Todaro in the title role. Other operettas during that season included The Gipsy Princess, The Count of Luxemburg, The Merry Widow and La Route Fleurie. In that same year, Milko made his debut on Mauritian Television singing the French song J'attendrai, which was made famous by Edith Piaf.

During the ensuing years, Milko then a student of Mauritian tenor Max Moutia, regularly appeared in clubs and hotels around the island. In 1979, Milko co-produced with Bernard Desvaux de Marigny a stage show on the music of Surcouf, that was later produced for the Mauritius Broadcasting Corporation – MBC, The Mauritian National Television.

In 1981, Milko produced and directed his first big production, Il était une fois l'opérette at the Port Louis Municipal Theatre. The show consisted of a 28-piece orchestra, a chorus of 30, 6 dancers and 6 lead singers including Milko. The show proved very successful with the Mauritian audience with 2 additional performances being added to the initial run.

In 1984, Milko was again employed by another Theatre Company touring Mauritius under the direction of French conductor Andre Martial; a former conductor at Le Chatelet in Paris. In the lead to this 1984 season, Milko was the representative for the French investors to the Mauritian authorities, co-ordinating the organisation of the season. Milko performed in the following operettas: La Belle de Cadix, The Merry Widow, Quatre Jours a Paris & Le Chanteur de Mexico. In that same year, Milko sang one of the leads in the French show PATHEPHONIE directed by Gerard Manuel. The show was produced to commemorate the 100 years of the Alliance Francaise in Mauritius. Earlier in the year, Milko sang the tenor role in Mozart's Requiem under the direction of Mauritian Conductor Gerard Lahausse de la Louvière.

Upon arriving in Australia, Milko studied with New Zealand Bass Grant Dickson and 2 years later made his debut as Luiz in Parramatta Theatre Company production of The Gondoliers. Other roles with various theatre companies around Sydney include Nathaniel & Franz in The Tales of Hoffmann, Camille de Rosillon in The Merry Widow.

In the mid nineties, Milko returned to popular music and started working in the club scene within Sydney's metropolitan region, scoring two Mo Awards nominations in 1996 & 1997.

Milko released his first album entitled To Dream in early 1998, produced by Miles Harris.

Milko toured for a few years with the stage show European Connection before producing his own show Hats off To Broadway which quickly became popular within the club circuit. Hats Off To Broadway also starred Rikelle Turner, Sheridan Gaudry and the Hats off show girls under the musical direction of John Watson.

In 2002, he starred in a new production Moulin Bergere, a show that brought Milko back to French popular music and in spring 2003, Milko produced and starred in the first Aznavour show in Australia. Aznavour...From Today, directed by Rikelle Turner is still working in Australia today.

In 2006, Milko made his international debut in the States performing a cabaret version of Aznavour...From Today at The Manor, the dream venue of all Cabaret performers accompanied by New York-based Musical Director Tex Arnold. Also in 2006, Milko released the first Aznavour album by an Australian recording artist, produced by guitar sensation and producer Clive Lendich. Clive is the only Australian musician of the American group The Manhattan Transfer.

Following his International debut and the release of his new album, Milko has emerged in the last few years as one of the leading ambassadors of French popular music in Australia. He has also brought to the stage in 2007 his production, Under Paris Skies, and his one man show, Strictly Continental.

In 2008, he returned to the Cabaret scene with his show, Pardon My French and performed at the Rugby World Cup in Canberra performing the French National Anthem before the match between France and Scotland.

In 2009, he won the 2009 BEST INTERNATIONAL THEME PERFORMER in Australia with his show AZNAVOUR...FROM TODAY.

In summer 2010, Milko opened EUROPEAN CARNEVALE SPECTACULAR at The Juniors, one of Sydney's leading clubs. In March Milko was invited to perform The for a Canadian Insurance company having their conference in Sydney. In June 2010, Milko was nominated for an Australian "MO" Award in the BEST INTERNATIONAL PERFORMER category and later that year, Milko made his directorial debuts, producing and directing NOSTALGIE LYRIQUE, a show of French Opera & French Operetta. Nostalgie Lyrique was the first show of its kind to be produced in Australia.

Early in 2011, Milko released a new album of French songs recorded in 2010 with various Sydney based Producers. The album "If you love me " is a selection of songs from Aznavour, Piaf & Bécaud. In April Milko released on YouTube the Jacques Brel classic "If We Only Have Love" recorded early in the year with stage partners Rikelle Turner & Sheridan Gaudry. Musical arrangement by Les Dempsey and the vocal arrangement by Ingrid Sakurovs. Early July Milko partnered with French chanteuse Amandine Petit for a Jacques Brel tribute at Guillaume on Bennelong at The Sydney Opera House for the Chris O'Brien Foundation Charity lunch.

With 2 new shows in 2012; THE FRENCH CROONERS & BY POPULAR DEMAND, Milko now has a catalogue of 8 productions available for booking." Milko Foucault –Larche Linkedin" gives a complete list of all productions and their various band combinations. Also in 2012, Milko produced & directed the second edition of Nostalgie Lyrique at Petersham Town Hall in Sydney with a cast of 41 . A sold-out performance to an enthusiastic audience; some of which had travelled from Melbourne to be part of this event described as "the French Musical event " of the year in Sydney. Milko made his return to Opera with the aria "Ah! Mes Amis" from Donizetti's " La Fille du Régiment" (The Daughter of the Regiment) and also performed the French adaptation of the very famous Barinkay's Aria from Strauss's Gipsy Baron, and excerpts from The Merry Widow, The White Horse Inn, Le Chanteur de Mexico and Surcouf (The first Mauritian Operetta).

In July 2013, Milko produced & directed PARIS BY NIGHT, another French show exclusive to The South Sydney Juniors Club in Sydney with two sold-out performances. The shows included leading lady, Rikelle Turner, The Fabulous Popset Dancers and The Sydney Cosmopolitan Quartet under The Musical direction of John Watson. Choreography: Debbie Graham – Lloyd. Earlier in that same month of July Milko had produced a new show titled SINCERELY YOURS, a show aimed at our Seniors.

On 30 October, 2013, to mark the 10 year anniversary of Aznavour's first and only show in Australia, Milko presented a revamped version of "AZNAVOUR...FROM TODAY" at a one-night-only performance at the Sydney Opera House. This new version of the show was directed by English – Australian actor Barry Quin, accompanied by The Sydney Cosmopolitan Orchestra along with Rikelle Turner, Sheridan Gaudry & Steve Brown and under the Musical Direction of John Watson. One of the "show – stoppers" of that performance was Charles Aznavour's Ave Maria; which resulted in a standing ovation in the middle of the show. A few weeks later, Milko recorded a studio version of the Aznavour Ave Maria for what he described as "an Ave Maria of modern times." It was produced by Marcus Holden in Sydney.

In 2014, Milko ventured into pop music and keeping up with the romantic music style that he prefers, he created ENGELBERT...The Way it used to be. The show opened at Revesby Workers Club in Sydney in October.

In 2015 and 2016, Milko launched another Australian first by teaming up a production of ‘Engelbert with Tom Jones’ on the same stage. TOM JONES & ENGELBERT TOGETHER AT LAST opened in July 2015 and played in some of the major rooms in Sydney. In 2016, a revamped version of Tom Jones and Engelbert welcomed a new Tom Jones performed by Australian Entertainer Jeff Fallon. In June, Milko worked with long time friend and musical director John Watson to create "Strictly Romance". July saw 2 more creations: "Carousel of Songs" in partnership with Rikelle Brown and "A Variety Show". A day later, "A Night in Paris" was released, produced exclusively for The Juniors.

In 2017, Milko made his "London" debut at the iconic BRASSERIE ZÉDEL - Crazy Coqs Cabaret performing his One-Man Show " Aznavour ...From Today" accompanied by London-based Musical Director Nathan Martin. That same year, Milko created a new production in Sydney, TENORS UNITED that run until 2018.

In 2018, it was time for Milko to return to the passion of his early years: French Operetta. "Il était une fois L'Opérette" was brought to the stage in Spring 2018. Milko sharing the stage with French-Australian Soprano Émilie Lemasson and Mauritian-born Tenor Lindsay Xavier. French operetta has a very small niche in Sydney & Melbourne and the decline in audience always make these ventures quite risky. Nevertheless, the show was very successful and in 2019, Milko & Lindsay Xavier went on to perform the show in Melbourne.

In the summer of 2018, Foucault-Larche began working on a show based on the lives and the music of two well-known French entertainers: Edith Piaf and Charles Aznavour. In April 2019, PIAF AND AZNAVOUR - Back in Time (Comme Autrefois) opened in Sydney with Corinne Andrew as Piaf and Foucault-Larche as Aznavour.

In 2021, despite the difficulties of operating in a Covid environment with lockdowns and restrictions, Milko created the first FRENCH MUSIC FESTIVAL - Francophonie 2021 in March presented by Top Note Promotions. Though some events had to be cancelled, the Festival still managed to present 6 events in NSW. Two new productions were created for the Festival: PARIS AFTER DARK & PIAF, AZNAVOUR & FRIENDS.
