= Mileta =

Mileta (Serbian: Милета) is a Serbian, Croatian, and Montenegrin masculine given name as well as a surname. Notable people with the name include:

Masculine given name

- Mileta Andrejević (1925–1989), American painter
- Mileta Jakšić (1863–1935), Serbian poet
- Mileta Lisica (born 1966), Serbian-Slovenian basketball player
- Mileta Poskurica (born 1954), Serbian politician
- Mileta Radojković (1778–1852), Serbian official
- Mileta Radulović (born 1981), Montenegrin football goalkeeper
- Mileta Rajović (born 1999), Danish footballer

Surname

- Danijel Mileta (born 1975), Croatian politician
- Fran Mileta (born 2000), Croatian handball player
- Jeronim Mileta (1871–1947), Croatian Catholic bishop
- Momir Mileta (born 1971), Serbian footballer

== See also ==
- Miletić
- Miletina
