= Milovan =

Milovan (Serbian Cyrillic: Милован, Serbo-Croatian: [miˈloːvan]) is a Slavic name derived from the passive adjective milovati ("caress"). Its presence has been recorded in Serbia since the Late Middle Ages. Variants include Milovanac and Milovanče.

It celebrates its name day on January 25 in Poland, where it is spelled Miłowan.

== Given name ==
- Milovan Bojić (born 1955), Serbian politician
- Milovan Ćirić (1918–1986), Serbian football manager
- Milovan Đilas (1911–1995), Montenegrin-Serbian Communist politician, theorist and author in Yugoslavia
- Milovan Đorić (born 1945), Serbian football player and manager
- Milovan Danojlić (1937–2022), Serbian writer
- Milovan Destil Marković (born 1957), visual artist
- Milovan Drašković (born 1995), Montenegrin basketball player
- Milovan Drecun (born 1957), Serbian journalist of Montenegrin descent
- Milovan Gavazzi (1895–1992), Croatian ethnologist
- Milovan Glišić (1847–1908), Serbian writer, dramatist, and literary theorist
- Milovan Ilic Minimaks (1938–2005), Serbian radio and TV journalist
- Milovan Jakšić (1909–1953), Serbian footballer
- Milovan Jović (1955–2009), Serbian footballer
- Milovan Kapor (born 1991), Canadian soccer player
- Milovan Krivokapić (born 1949), Serbian politician
- Milovan Milovanović (1863–1912), Serbian politician, diplomat and constitutional lawyer
- Milovan Milović (born 1980), Serbian footballer
- Milovan Mirosevic (born 1980), Chilean footballer
- Milovan Obradović (born 1956), Serbian footballer
- Milovan Petrovikj (born 1990), Macedonian footballer
- Milovan Minja Prelević (1970–2019), Montenegrin footballer and coach
- Milovan Raković (born 1985), Serbian professional basketball player
- Milovan Rajevac (born 1954), Serbian footballer
- Milovan Savić (born 1953), Croatian middle-distance runner
- Milovan Sikimić (born 1980), Serbian footballer
- Milovan Stanković (born 1969), Serbian writer
- Milovan Stepandić (1954–2020), Serbian basketball coach
- Milovan Vesnić (fl. 2014), Serbian racing driver
- Milovan Vidaković (1780–1841), Serbian writer
- Milovan Vitezović (1944–2022), Serbian writer, poet, play writer and satirist
- Milovan Zoričić (1884–1971), Croatian football official and criminal judge
- Milovan Zoričić (statistician) (1850–1912), Croatian statistician

== Surname ==
- Berndt Lubich von Milovan, Hauptsturmführer in the Waffen SS during World War II
- Irena Milovan (1937–2020), Yugoslav ballet dancer
- Ivan Milovan (born 1940), Croatian Roman Catholic prelate

== Place names ==
- Milovan, a village in Pleșoi Commune, Dolj County, Romania

== See also ==
- Milovanov
- Milovanović
- Miloslav, "Mila"
- Slavic names

== Sources ==
- Grković, Milica (1977). Rečnik ličnih imena kod Srba. Belgrade: Vuk Karadžić.
