= Milojko Grujić =

Serbian politician (born 1944)

Milojko Grujić (Serbian Cyrillic: Милојко Грујић; born 15 May 1944) is a Serbian former politician. He served in the Serbian national assembly from 1994 to 1997 as a member of the Socialist Party of Serbia (SPS).

== Early life and private career ==
Grujić was born in the village of Zavlaka in Krupanj during the closing stages of the Axis occupation of Serbia in World War II and was raised after the war in the Federal People's Republic of Yugoslavia. He attended the Higher School of Pedagogy in Tuzla, Bosnia and Herzegovina, and worked as a teacher.

== Politician ==
Grujić received the twenty-first position (out of twenty-four) on the Socialist Party's electoral list for the Užice division in the 1992 Serbian parliamentary election. The list won ten seats, and he was not given a mandate. (From 1992 to 2000, Serbia's electoral law stipulated that one-third of parliamentary mandates would be assigned to candidates from successful lists in numerical order, while the remaining two-thirds would be distributed amongst other candidates at the discretion of the sponsoring parties. It was common practice for the latter mandates to be awarded out of order. Grujić could have been given a mandate despite his low position on the list, but this did not occur.)

He was promoted to the sixteenth position on the SPS's list for Užice in the 1993 Serbian parliamentary election. The list won eleven seats in the division, and on this occasion he was assigned an "optional" mandate, taking his seat when the new assembly convened in January 1994. The Socialist Party of Serbia won a strong plurality victory in the 1993 election and governed afterward in a coalition with New Democracy (ND). During his parliamentary term, Grujić was a member of the committee on transport and communications. He was not a candidate in the 1997 Serbian parliamentary election.

Grujić later ran for mayor Krupanj in the 2004 Serbian local elections, the only regular local election cycle in which mayors were directly elected. He was defeated in the second round of voting.

== Electoral record ==
=== Local (Krupanj) ===
2004 Municipality of Krupanj local election: Mayor of Krupanj
Candidate	Party	First round		Second round	
Candidate	Party	Votes	%	Votes	%
Zoran Grujičić Mindo	Democratic Party–Serbian Renewal Movement (Affiliation: Democratic Party)			4,275	61.95
Milojko Grujić	Socialist Party of Serbia			2,626	38.05
Rade Milićević	Serbian Radical Party				
other candidates					
Total				6,901	100.00
