= Miljko =

Miljko (Serbian: Миљко) is a Serbian masculine given name, derived from Slavic mil- ("love, to like") and hypocoristic suffix -ko, both very common in Slavic dithematic names. It may refer to:

- Miljko Radonjić (1770–1836), Serbian writer, professor and minister
- Miljko Radisavljević, Special prosecutor for organized crime
- Miljko Radonjić, drummer, Riblja Čorba
- Miljko's Monastery, Serbia
- Miljko Živojinović, movie producer, Shadows of Memories
- Miljko Stefanović, Serbian officer, 252nd Training Squadron

== See also ==
- Milko (disambiguation)
- Miljković
