= Milovanović =

Milovanović (Serbian Cyrillic: Миловановић) is a Serbian surname derived from a masculine given name Milovan, and may refer to:

- Branko Milovanović (born 1973), Serbian footballer
- Danijel Milovanović (born 1973), Swedish footballer
- Dejan Milovanović (1984–2025), Serbian footballer
- Đorđe Milovanović (1956–2009), Serbian footballer, nicknamed "Đoka Bomba"
- Đorđe Milovanović-Guzonja (d. 1817), Serbian revolutionary
- Elena Milovanović (born 2001), Serbian tennis player
- Ivan »Ivo« Milovanović, Slovenian sports journalist
- Marko Milovanović (footballer, born 1982), Serbian footballer
- Marko Milovanović (footballer, born 2003), Serbian footballer
- Mateja Milovanović (born 2004), Serbian footballer
- Mladen Milovanović, Serb State President in the 19th century
- Rade Milovanović (1954–2024), Bosnian and American chess master
- Uroš Milovanović (born 2000), Serbian footballer
- Vladan Milovanović (born 1970), Serbian footballer
