= Zahradníček =

Zahradníček is a Czech-language surname. It means "little gardener" in English.

Notable people with the surname include:

- Čeněk Zahradníček (1900–1989), Czech film director
- Jan Zahradníček (1905–1960), Czech poet
- Tomáš Zahradníček (born 1993), Czech footballer
