= Miladinovtsi =

Miladinovtsi may refer to:

- In Bulgaria (written in Cyrillic as Миладиновци):
  - Miladinovtsi, Dobrich Province - a village in the Dobritchka municipality, Dobrich Province
  - Miladinovtsi, Targovishte Province - a village in the Targovishte municipality, Targovishte Province
  - Miladinovtsi, Yambol Province - a village in the Tundzha municipality, Yambol Province
- In the Republic of North Macedonia (written in Cyrillic as Миладиновци):
  - Miladinovtsi, North Macedonia - a village in Ilinden Municipality
