= Grubišić =

Grubišić or Grubisic is a Croatian surname. Notable people with the surname include:

- Brett Josef Grubisic (b. 1963), Canadian novelist
- Ivan Grubišić (b. 1936), Croatian priest and politician
- Jelena Grubišić (b. 1987), Croatian handball player
- Katia Grubisic (b. 1978), Canadian writer
- Mato Grubisic (b. 1982), Norwegian football player
- Tea Grubišić (b. 1985), Croatian handball player
- Veselko Grubišić (b.1961), Croatian poet, Ambassador
