= Ivana Milanovic =

Serbian and American mechanical engineer

Ivana M. Milanovic is a Serbian and American mechanical engineer and engineering educator. A specialist in the computational fluid dynamics of fluid jets, she is also known for her advocacy of simulation software in the classroom. She is a professor of mechanical, aerospace, and acoustical engineering at the University of Hartford.

== Education and career ==
Milanovic is originally from Čačak and went to school in Belgrade. She earned a bachelor's degree from the University of Belgrade, in 1988, with a thesis involving heat transfer for building-level heating, ventilation, and air conditioning. Next, she worked in industry on geothermal energy and energy-efficient buildings. Returning from 1991 to 1995 to the University of Belgrade as an assistant professor in the Faculty of Mechanical Engineering, she began her work in fluid mechanics, earning a master's degree in 1993 under the supervision of Vladan Đorđević.

She came to the Brooklyn Polytechnic Institute (now the New York University Tandon School of Engineering) as a doctoral student in 1995, working there with George Vradis, and completed her Ph.D. there in 1999. After a year as a lecturer at Columbia University, she joined the University of Hartford as an assistant professor in 2001. She was promoted to associate professor in 2006 and full professor in 2012.

== Recognition ==
Milanovic was elected as an ASME Fellow in 2019. In 2022, the American Society for Engineering Education gave her their Northeast Section Outstanding Teacher Award, and the University of Hartford gave her their Roy E. Larsen Award for Excellence in Teaching.
