= Milić =

Milić (Cyrillic: Милић) is a Serbian given name and surname, and Croatian surname. People with the name include:

== Given name ==
- Milić od Mačve (1934–2000), Serbian painter and artist
- Milić Vukašinović (born 1950), Serbian musician

== Surname ==
- Antonio Milić (born 1994), Croatian footballer
- Borislav Milić (1925–1986), Chess grandmaster
- Đorđe Milić (born 1943), Yugoslav football player and manager
- Goran Milić (born 1946), Croatian Journalist
- Hrvoje Milić (born 1989), Croatian footballer
- Jasmin Milić (born 1969), Croatian Anglican bishop
- Srđan Milić (born 1965), Montenegrin politician

== Pseudonym ==
- Maks Baće (1914–2005), Croatian and Yugoslav soldier, nom de guerre Milić

== See also ==
- Milič (disambiguation), including Milíč
- Milići (disambiguation)
- Miliće, a village in Serbia
- Milović
- Milanović
