= Milutin =

Milutin (Serbian: Милутин) is a Serbian masculine given name of Slavic origin. The name may refer to:

- Stephen Uroš II Milutin of Serbia (1253–1321), king of Serbia
- Milutin Bojić (1892–1917), poet
- Milutin Ivković (1906–1943), footballer
- Milutin Milanković (1879–1958), Serbian scientist
- Milutin Mrkonjić (1942–2021), politician
- Milutin Šoškić (born 1937–2022), former Serbian goalkeeper

== See also ==
- Milutinović
- Milutinovac
