= Aleksandar Miljković (footballer, born 1982) =

Serbian footballer

Personal information
- Full name: Aleksandar Miljković
- Date of birth: 23 August 1982 (age 44)
- Place of birth: Smederevo, SFR Yugoslavia
- Height: 1.80 m (5 ft 11 in)
- Position: Midfielder

Senior career*
Years	Team	Apps	(Gls)
2001–2005	Železničar Smederevo	50	(9)
2005	→ Smederevo (loan)	6	(0)
2006–2007	INON Požarevac	27	(2)
2007–2009	Smederevo	37	(2)
2010	Southern Myanmar United		
2011	Kovačevac	9	(0)
2012–2015	Smederevo	49	(1)
- * Club domestic league appearances and goals as of 17:00, 18 June 2014 (UTC)

Aleksandar Miljković (Serbian Cyrillic: Александар Mиљкoвић; born 23 August 1982) is a Serbian retired football midfielder who primarily played for hometwown club FK Smederevo in the Serbian First League.

He also played with FK Železničar Smederevo and INON Požarevac and had a spell in Myanmar.
