= Aleksandar Miljković (musician) =

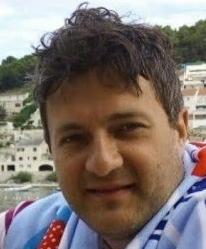
- Miljković in 2019

Background information
- Born: 26 March 1975 (age 51); Belgrade, SR Serbia, SFR Yugoslavia
- Genre: Classical music
- Occupations: Bassist, composer
- Instrument: Double bass

Aleksandar Miljković (Serbian Cyrillic: Александар Миљковић; born 26 March 1975) is a Serbian classical double bassist.

== Biography ==
He was born on 26 March 1975 to father Blagoje (1927–1993), a longtime journalist of Radio Belgrade, and mother Olivera (née Janković; 1935–2025).

After finishing music high school in 1994, he studied bass at the University of Arts in Belgrade, the Interlochen Center for the Arts in Michigan, the Royal Swedish Academy of Music, and completed postgraduate studies at the Conservatorio Superior de Música de Salamanca.

== Composing career ==
Miljković has published four books. According to a 2026 profile in Večernje novosti, his publications include a collection of pieces for double bass, double-bass textbooks used in Ghana and Republika Srpska, and the book From Music to Sport. The same source reported that he composed the concerto for double bass and orchestra Trio Olivera, dedicated to his mother, Olivera Miljković. In 2024, the Ghana News Agency reported that copies of his Aleksandar Miljkovic Music Pieces book had been donated to a school in Ghana for use in music teaching and learning.

A substantial part of Miljković's composing work has been connected with sport. In 2020, Sportski žurnal reported that a youth football tournament in Ghana had been named after Miljković and his father Blagoje after he composed an anthem for the Ghanaian club Real Emirates. By 2026, Večernje novosti reported that he had written and donated around fifty official anthems for sports clubs and competitions over a period of two decades, and that he had been inducted into an African sports and entertainment hall of fame. The newspaper also reported that his sports-related works included official music for the Mediterranean Games and a CD dedicated to Cuban boxer Teófilo Stevenson. His sports compositions include works connected with several sections of Red Star Belgrade Sports Society. In 2023, Canadian football club Serbian White Eagles FC announced that a composition by Miljković and his mother Olivera would serve as the club's official music.

In August 2026, Unique World Records listed Miljković as the holder of its record for “Most Official Sports Anthems Composed by an Individual”. The organisation based the record on 28 original sports anthems and official musical compositions that he composed for sports clubs, organisations and competitions across several sports and countries between 2012 and 2024. Serbian regional newspaper Topličke vesti reported that Miljković received recognitions from both Unique World Records and Official World Record in August 2026. The newspaper also reported that he had written and donated more than 50 official anthems and musical works for sports clubs, competitions and sporting events in several countries over the preceding two decades.

In March 2026, a contributor article published by ModernGhana reported that the Olivera Miljkovic Foundation launched what it described as an official textbook, A Story of Friendship, Music and Community Development, for schools in Gomoa Fetteh, Ghana. The article reported that Aleksandar Miljković and his mother Olivera Miljković are among the personalities featured in the textbook.

In June 2026, Topličke vesti reported that Miljković composed Ostrikovačko kolo, inspired by his mother's family origins in Ostrikovac near Ćuprija, Serbia.

In April 2026, Miljković was honoured with a medal from the Chief and people of Gomoa Fetteh in Ghana for his contributions to the community and his work with the Olivera Miljković Foundation.

Miljković has also given solo concerts and other public performances in Serbia and abroad. Večernje novosti reported performances in Croatia, the United States, Sweden and Spain, as well as a solo concert in Vienna in 2006 that received support from the Serbian Ministry of Culture.

== Tutor ==
Miljković has taught double bass at the Stanković Music School in Belgrade since 2002. He also taught double bass at the Academy of Fine Arts in Belgrade and has taught in Pučišća, Croatia, since 2013. Since 2014, he has taught music at Dositej High School in Belgrade. He has also appeared as a guest lecturer at Melosia Academy in Sri Lanka.

His students from the Stanković Music School have performed at venues including the Cultural Centre of Belgrade and the Student Cultural Centre, as well as at Red Star Stadium and events connected with the Night of Museums.
