= Milenko =

Milenko (Cyrillic script: Миленко) is a name of Slavic origin, primarily used as a masculine given name. Notable people named Milenko include:

== People named Milenko ==
=== As a given name ===
- Milenko Ačimovič (born 1977), Slovenian football player
- Milenko Bajić (1944–2009), Bosnian-Herzegovinian and Yugoslav football player and manager
- Milenko Bogićević (born 1976), Serbian basketball coach
- Milenko Bojanić (1924–1987), Yugoslav politician and Prime Minister of Serbia 1964–1967
- Milenko Bošnjaković (born 1968), Bosnian football manager
- Milenko Đedović (born 1972), Serbian football player
- Milenko Jovanov (born 1980), Serbian politician
- Milenko Kersnić (born 1946), Slovenian gymnast
- Milenko Kiković (born 1954), Serbian football player and manager
- Milenko Kovačević (born 1963), Yugoslav football player
- Milenko Lekić (born 1936), Serbian gymnast
- Milenko Milošević (born 1976), Bosnian football player
- Milenko Nedelkovski, host of the Milenko Nedelkovski Show in North Macedonia
- Milenko Paunović (1889–1924), Serbian composer and writer
- Milenko Pavlović (1959–1999), Yugoslav fighter pilot
- Milenko Savović (1960–2021), Serbian basketball player
- Milenko Sebić (born 1984), Serbian sports shooter
- Milenko Špoljarić (born 1967), Yugoslavian football player
- Milenko Stefanović (born 1930), Serbian clarinet player
- Milenko Stojković (1769–1831), Serbian revolutionary during the First Serbian Uprising
- Milenko Tepić (born 1987), Serbian basketball player
- Milenko Trifunovic, convicted of aiding and abetting the Bosnian genocide (2008)
- Milenko Topić (born 1969), Serbian basketball player and coach
- Milenko Velev (fl. 1844–1859), known as Master Milenko, Bulgarian architect
- Milenko Veljković (born 1995), Serbian basketball player
- Milenko Radomar Vesnić (1863–1921), Serbian politician and diplomat
- Milenko Vlajkov (born 1950), Serbian psychologist
- Milenko Vukčević (born 1966), Yugoslav football player
- Milenko Zablaćanski (1955–2008), Serbian actor, director, and play writer
- Milenko Zorić (born 1989), Serbian sprint canoeist

=== As a surname ===
- Jovan Grčić Milenko (1846–1875), Serbian poet and physician
- Simon Milenko (born 1988), Australian cricket player

== See also ==
- The Great Milenko, the fourth studio album released by American hip hop duo Insane Clown Posse
- Miljenko, alternative form
- Milenković, a patronymic name derived from Milenko
