= Milivojevci =

- Village
- Location within Croatia
- Coordinates: 45°25′04″N 17°32′50″E
- Country: Croatia
- Region: Slavonia
- County: Požega-Slavonia County
- Municipality: Velika

Area
  - Total: 2.4 km^{2} (0.93 sq mi)
- Elevation: 287 m (942 ft)

Population (2021)
  - Total: 12
  - Density: 5.0/km^{2} (13/sq mi)
- Time zone: UTC+1 (CET)
  - Summer (DST): UTC+2 (CEST)
- Postal code: 34320
- Area code: 034

Milivojevci is a village in Požega-Slavonia County, Croatia. The village is administered as a part of the Velika municipality. According to national census of 2011, population of the village is 17. The village is connected by the Ž4100 county road.
