= Milan Švihálek =

Czech screenwriter (1944–2025)

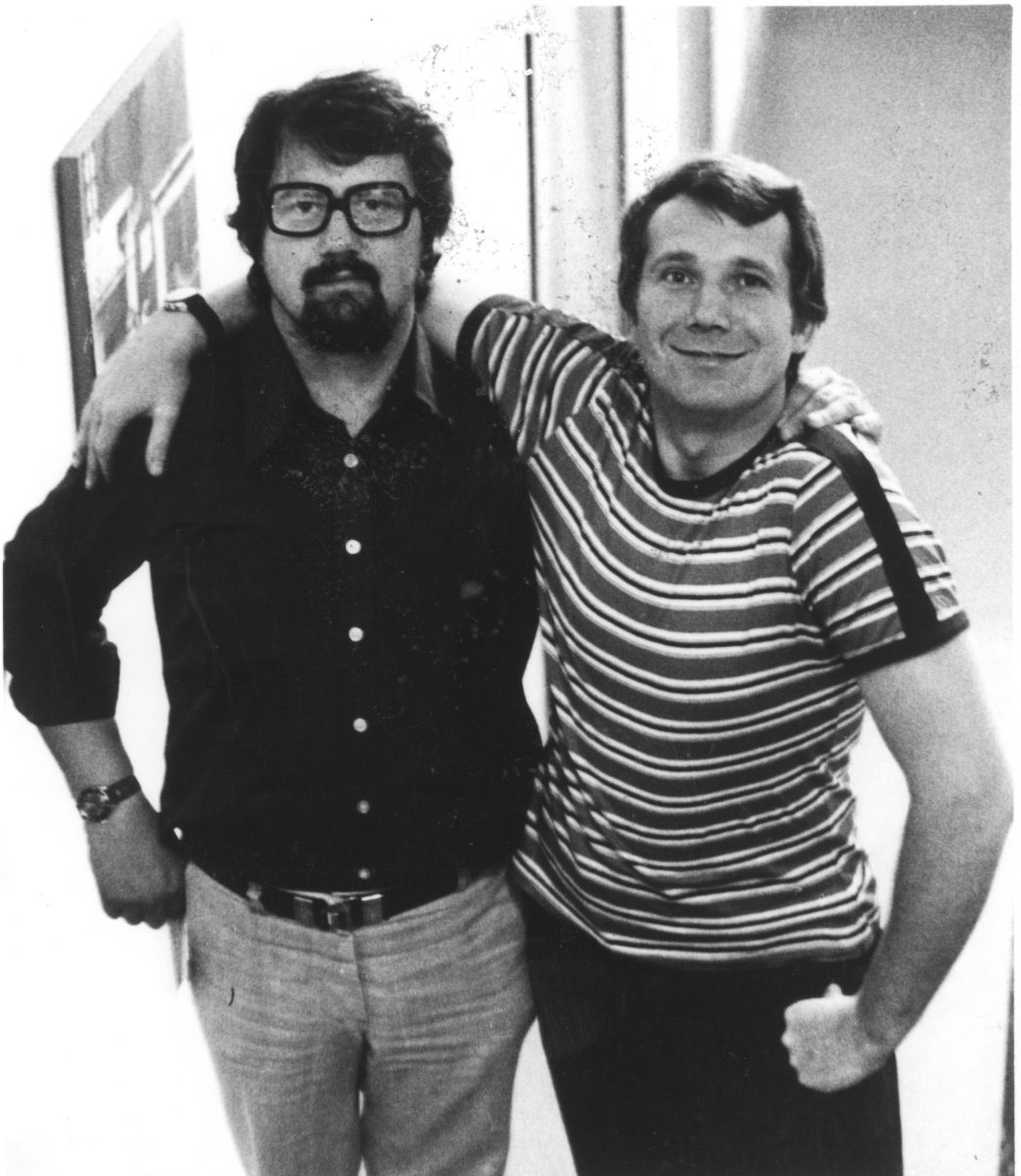
Jiří Vrožina (left) and Milan Švihálek (right)

Milan Švihálek (11 January 1944 – 12 July 2025) was a Czech dramaturge, screenwriter, journalist, presenter, editor, and writer.

== Life and career ==
Švihálek was born 11 January 1944 in Brno, and studied at the Film and TV School of the Academy of Performing Arts in Prague. He later graduated from the Faculty of Journalism of Charles University in 1982. Initially, he worked as a stage worker at the Oldřich Stibor Theatre in Olomouc and collaborated with the amateur theatre SKUMA(F)KA. He briefly worked as a methodologist at the District House of Education in Olomouc. From 1968 he worked as an editor and dramaturge for Czech Television Ostrava. In the first half of the 1990s, he was the head of one of the creative groups of journalism in the Ostrava studio of Czech Television. From 1994 onwards, he worked as a freelance screenwriter, publicist and journalist.

He wrote scripts for journalism, competitions, documentaries, entertainment and educational programs and series. He collaborated with cinematographer and director Jiří Vrožina (series on health issues, travelogues by Richard Konkolski). From 1979 to 1984, in collaboration with director Zdeněk Havlíček, he worked on competition programmes (YES – NO, Větrná růžice, Všechno za minutu). In 1990, he collaborated with Jiří Vrožina on the series Australian Encounters. However, only four episodes out of the intended thirteen were filmed. He also collaborated with Miroslav Zikmund, František Mudra, Vítězslav Dostál, Miroslav Kačor and others. As an author, he participated in the documentary series Forgotten Expeditions, Fateful Moments, etc. For the series For Witnesses of the Past, he received the annual Czechoslovak Television Award and the Czech Literary Fund Award.

Švihálek died on 12 July 2025, at the age of 81.
