= Milosav =

Milosav (Serbian: Милосав) is a Serbian masculine given name. Notable people with the name include:

- Milosav Jelić (1883–1947), Serbian chetnik and poet
- Milosav Jovanović (1935–2014), Serbian artist
- Milosav Lapovac (1770–1844), Serbian revolutionary
- Milosav Miličković (born 1959), Serbian politician
- Milosav Milojević (born 1954), Serbian politician
- Milosav Sićović (born 1999), Serbian footballer
- Milosav Zdravković (1787–1854), Serbian revolutionary
- Bakal-Milosav (1770–1823), Serbian revolutionary

== See also ==
- Miloslav, Slavic given name
