= Milomir =

Milomir (Bulgarian: Миломир, Russian: Миломир, Czech: Milomír, Serbian Cyrillic: Миломир) is a Slavic masculine given name, a Slavic name derived from milo "love, to like" and mir "world, peace, prestige". It may refer to:

- Milomir Kovac, Serbian-German veterinary surgeon
- Milomir Marić, Serbian journalist
- Milomir Miljanić, Montenegrin musician
- Milomir Minić, Serbian politician
- Milomir Odović, Bosnian football manager and former player
- Milomir Stakić, Bosnian Serb war-time politician
- Milomir Šešlija, Bosnian football manager and former player

In Slovakia on 3 July each year celebrated the name day (Slovak: meniny) of Milomír.

== See also ==
- Miomir
