= Miloš Zahradník =

Czech mathematician

Miloš Zahradník is a Czech mathematician who works on statistical mechanics in Charles University in Prague. He is also known for the book We Grow Linear Algebra (in Czech) that he wrote with Luboš Motl.
