= Miloje =

Miloje (Serbian Cyrillic: Милоје, pronounced [mîloje]) is a Serbian masculine given name of Slavic origin. It may refer to:

- Miloje Miletić (born 1953), general
- Miloje Milojević (1884–1946), musician
- Miloje Petković (born 1967), retired footballer
- Miloje Preković (born 1991), football goalkeeper

== See also ==
- Milojević
