= Miloslav =

- Pronunciation: [ˈmiloslaf]
- Gender: male
- Language: Czech

Origin
- Origin: Slavic
- Meaning: mil ("merciful, dear") + slava ("glory")

Other names
- Alternative spelling: Miłosław
- Variant forms: Miloslava, Miłosław, Miłosława
- Nickname: Miloš
- Related names: Milosav

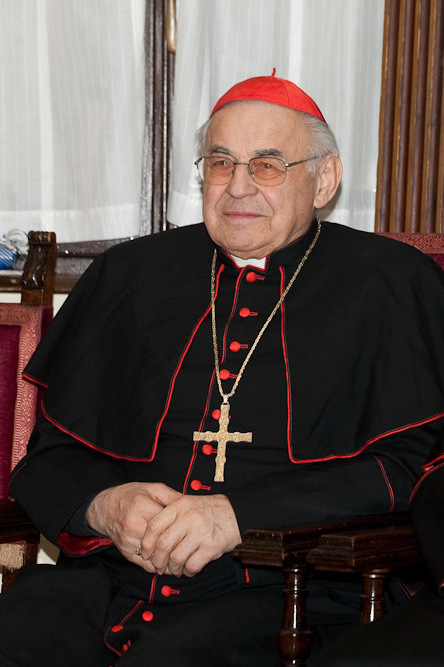
Card. Miloslav Vlk

Miloslav is a Slavic masculine given name, derived from the Slavic root mil-, "merciful" or "dear", and -slav glory.

== Name variants ==
- feminine form: Miloslava
- diminutive form: Miloš
- Polish: Miłosław/Miłosława
- Czech feminine: Miloslava

== Name Days ==
- Czech: 18 December
- Slovak: 3 July

== Men ==
- Miloslav Fleischmann (1886–1955), Czechoslovak hockey player
- Miloslav Gureň (born 1976), Czech hockey player
- Miloslav Hamr (1913–2002), Czech tennis player
- Michal Miloslav Hodža (1811–1870), Slovak national revivalist
- Miloslav Hořava (born 1961), Czech hockey player
- Jozef Miloslav Hurban (1817–1888), Slovak politician and writer
- Miloslav Ištvan (1928–1990), Czech composer
- Miloslav Kabeláč (1908–1979), Czech composer and conductor
- Miloslav Konopka (born 1979), Slovak hammer thrower
- Miloslav Kousal (born 1978), Czech footballer
- Miloslav Kufa (born 1971), Czech footballer
- Miloslav Masopust (1924–2026), Czech general
- Miloslav Mečíř (born 1964), Slovak tennis player
- Miloslav Navrátil (born 1958), Czech darts player
- Miloslav Pokorný (1926–1948), Czech hockey player
- Miloslav Ransdorf (1953–2016), Czech politician
- Miloslav Rechcigl, Sr. (1904–1973), Czech politician and journalist
- Miloslav Schmidt (1881–1934), Slovak Esperantist
- Miloslav Šimek (1940–2004), Czech comedian
- Miloslav Topinka (born 1945), Czech poet
- Miloslav Valouch (1878–1952), Czech physicist and mathematician
- Miloslav Vlk (1932–2017), Czech Catholic archbishop and cardinal
- Miloslav Vlček (born 1961), Czech politician
- Miloslav Samardžić (born 1963), Serbian author and historian

== Women ==
- Miloslava Tumová, Czechoslovak figure skater
- Miloslava Rezková (1950–2014), Czechoslovak high jumper
- Miloslava Misáková (1922–2015), Czech Olympic gymnast
- Miloslava Svobodová (born 1984), Czech basketball player
- Miloslava Vostrá (born 1965), Czech politician

== See also ==
- Milosav, Serbian given name
- Slavic names
