= Milinović =

Milinović (Serbian Cyrillic: Милиновић) is a Bosnian, Bunjevac, Croatian and Serbian surname, derived from the noun milina (grace, pleasure, enjoyment). The surname refers to the medieval clan spreading out into a few family branches, mostly in the territory of former Austria-Hungary. It may refer to:

- Damir Milinović (born 1972), Croatian football player
- Darko Milinović (born 1963), Croatian politician
- Daško Milinović (born 1980), Serbian singer and TV personality
- Miloš Milinović (born 1984), Serbian football player
- Momčilo Milinović (born 1954), Serbian researcher and professor
- Šimun Milinović (1835–1910), Croatian bishop
- Tinka Milinović (born 1973), Bosnian-born American musician and TV personality
- Tomo Milinović (1770–1846), Serbian revolutionary

== See also ==
- Milinović kapela u Subotici
