= Milanković =

Milanković (Serbian Cyrillic: Миланковић) is a Serbian surname derived from the masculine given name Milanko. It may refer to:

- Milutin Milanković (1879–1958), Serbian mathematician, astronomer, and geophysicist
- Nikola Milanković (born 1986), Serbian footballer
- Veljko Milanković (1955–1993), Serbian war commander

== See also ==
- 1605 Milankovitch, an asteroid
- Milankovič (lunar crater)
- Milankovič (Martian crater)
- Milankovitch cycles, periodic changes in the orbital movements of the earth
