= Religion in Slovenia =

Religious affiliation in Slovenia (2022)
1. Catholicism (53.8%)
2. Eastern Orthodoxy (4.40%)
3. Protestantism (1.10%)
4. Other Christian (0.60%)
5. No religion (31.3%)
6. Islam (4.90%)
7. Other religion (1.10%)
8. No answer (2.70%)
Religion in Slovenia (2019)
1. Catholicism 72.1 (69.5%)
2. Eastern Orthodoxy 3.7 (3.57%)
3. Protestantism 0.9 (0.87%)
4. Other Christian 1 (0.96%)
5. None 18 (17.4%)
6. Islam 3 (2.89%)
7. Other religion 3 (2.89%)
8. Undeclared 2 (1.93%)

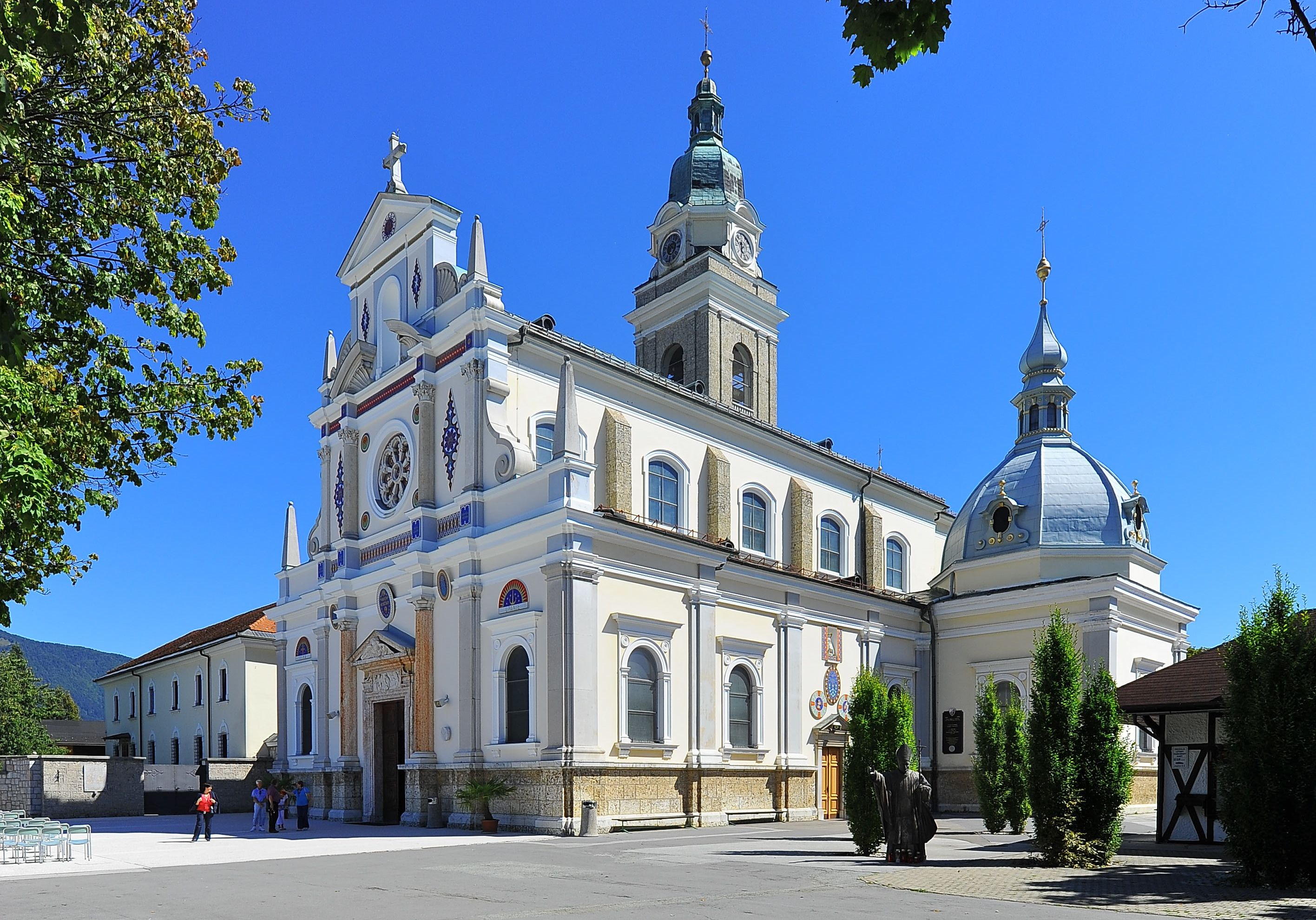
Basilica of the Virgin Mary in Brezje, also known as the Slovenian National Shrine, is the most visited Catholic pilgrimage site in Slovenia

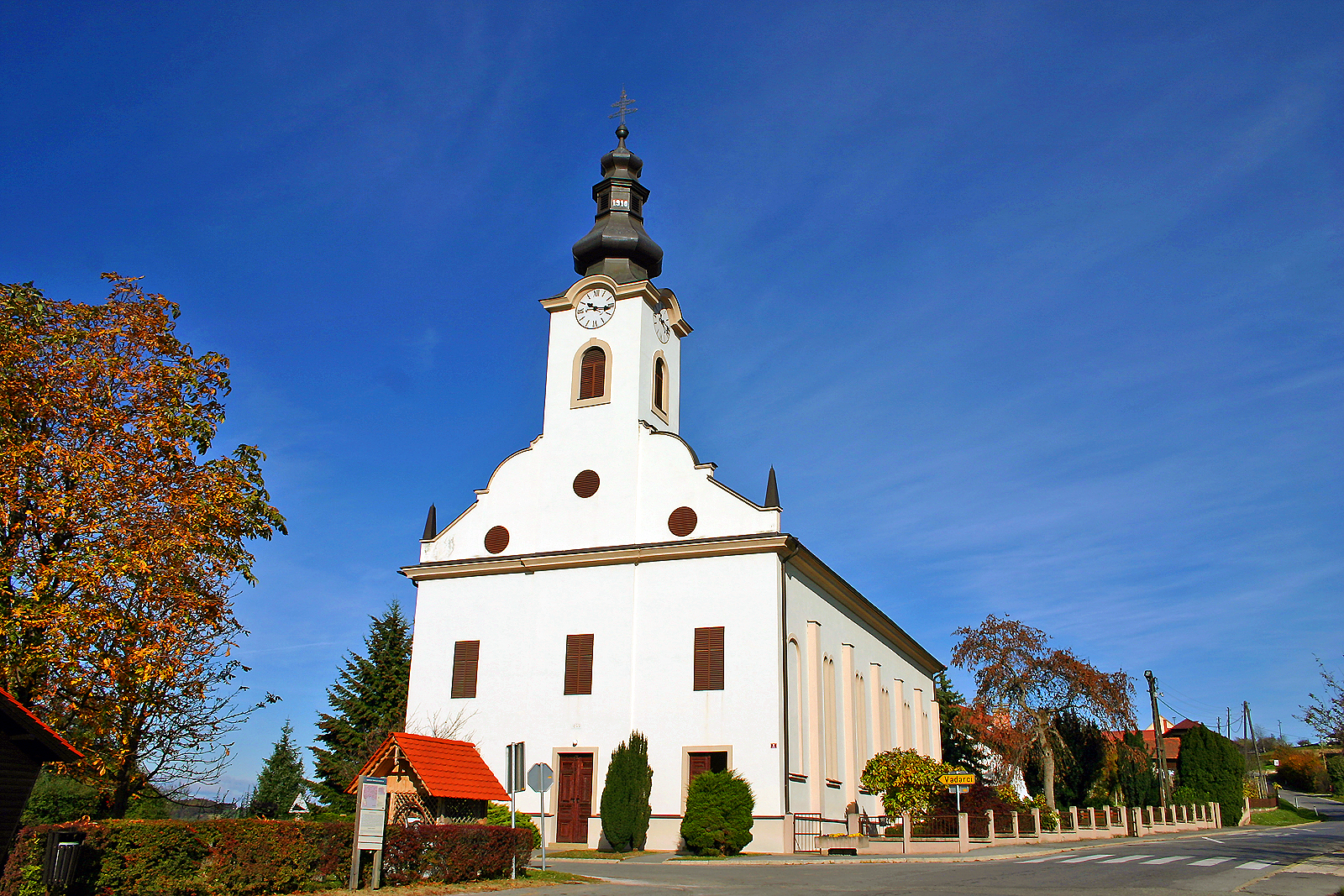
Lutheran church in Bodonci in the Prekmurje region

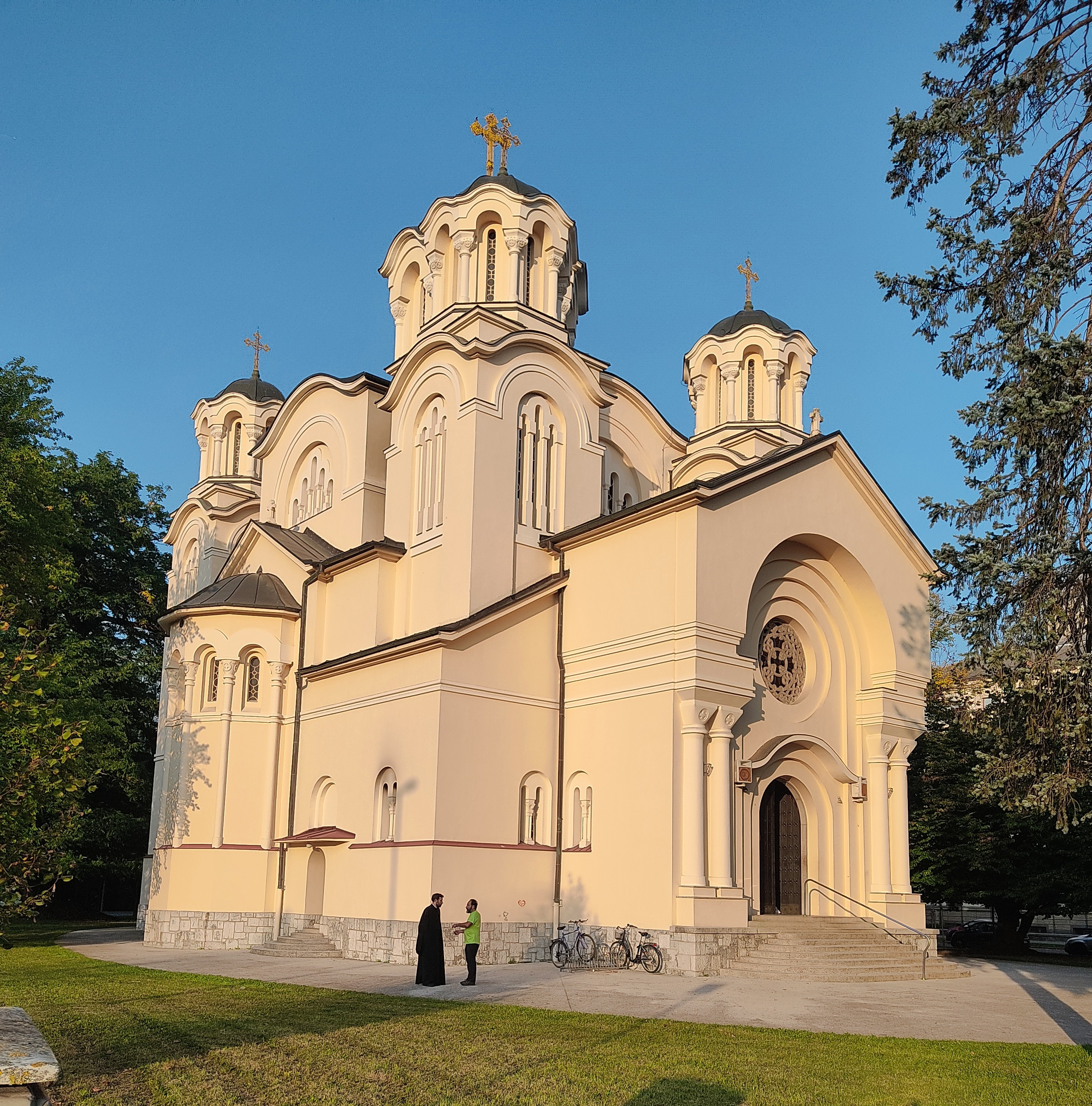
Sts. Cyril and Methodius Serbian Orthodox Church in Ljubljana

The dominant religion in Slovenia is Christianity, primarily the Catholic Church, which is the largest Christian denomination in the country. Other Christian groups having significant followings in the country include Eastern Orthodoxy and Protestantism (Lutheranism). Islam, Judaism and Hinduism are small minorities in Slovenia. About 18% of the population are either agnostic or atheist.

Religion played a significant role in the development of the Slovenian nation and of the country of Slovenia. After a centuries-long tradition of a state church, interrupted by the periods of Protestant Reformation (in the 16th century) and post–World War II socialism (which ousted religion from public life), a degree of separation of the state and the church has been reached in independent Slovenia. In February 2007 Slovenia passed a new Religious Freedom Act with a bias towards the Catholic Church (particularly in regard to state funding) and strict terms for the registration of new religious communities.

== Christianity ==
=== Catholicism ===
The Catholic Church in Slovenia is part of the worldwide Catholic Church, under the spiritual leadership of the Pope in Rome.

There are around 1,135,626 Catholics in the country (about 57.8% of the total population as per the 2002 Census). The country is divided into six dioceses, including two archdioceses. The diocese of Maribor was elevated to an archdiocese by Pope Benedict XVI in 2006. Additionally, the pope created three new sees, namely Novo Mesto, Celje and Murska Sobota.

=== Protestantism ===
Protestantism is tightly-knit with the history of Slovenians, with the Slovenian language having been established in the Reformation. Primož Trubar was a leading early Slovenian author and a Protestant reformer. He contributed to the development of the Slovenian language and Slovenian culture.

The Reformation flourished in the 16th century, accounting for the vast majority of cultural development in Slovenian. Lutheranism was the most popular Protestant denomination among Slovenians, with minorities, most notably Calvinism.

Protestantism among Slovenians was aggressively attempted to be wiped out by the Habsburgs with the Counter-Reformation. The Counter-Reformation was heavily deployed to the majority of Slovenian-speaking territory. Means used involved murder, extradition, book-burning and a general ban of the Slovenian language. Excluded were eastern regions (such as Prekmurje), ruled by Hungarian nobility, often Calvinist. Historically, Hungarians had taken up Lutheranism first, before gradually switching to Calvinism. They did not have a policy of extinguishing Lutheranism.

Protestantism among Slovenians survived the Counter-Reformation scattered. Protestantism is a minority group of Christian denominations in the Republic of Slovenia today. The largest community of Protestant Slovenians lives in the Prekmurje region, most of them are Lutheran.

=== Eastern Orthodoxy ===
Eastern Orthodoxy maintains a significant presence in the country and is practised in majority by Slovenians of Serb heritage. The Serbian Orthodox Church, to which the overwhelming majority of Eastern Orthodox Christians in the country adhere, is the sole Eastern Orthodox canonical jurisdiction in the territory of Slovenia and exercise its jurisdiction through the Metropolitanate of Zagreb and Ljubljana.

Eastern Orthodoxy in Slovenian lands has historically been closely associated with the local Serbian community (particularly community in White Carniola). The first recorded encounters with Eastern Orthodoxy in Slovenia occurred during the rule of the Counts of Celje. In 1434, Count Ulrich II of Celje married Katarina Branković, daughter of the Serbian Despot Đurađ Branković, who brought Orthodox priests to serve at the Celje court. Orthodox Serbs also arrived in Celje’s territories as soldiers.

During the 15th and 16th centuries, waves of Orthodox migrants, mostly Vlachs fleeing the Ottoman Empire conquests, settled in what is today Slovenia. While some assimilated into the local population, others remained in the White Carniola region, establishing seven Serbian Uskok settlements, some of which have maintained a continuous Orthodox presence to the present day.

The region formed part of the Military Frontier, where Orthodox soldiers were granted land and religious freedom in return for military service. Following the abolition of the Military Frontier in 1881, three of these villages (Marindol, Miliči and Paunoviči) became part of the Kingdom of Croatia-Slavonia and later the Sava Banovina in the Kingdom of Yugoslavia. During World War II in Yugoslavia, these villages fell under Italian-occupied Slovenia, but after the war, they were transferred back to the People’s Republic of Croatia. In 1952, the local population voted to re-join the People’s Republic of Slovenia.

== Religious minorities ==
=== Islam ===
The Muslims in Slovenia are ethnically mostly Bosniaks and ethnic Muslims. In 2014, there were 48,266 Muslims in Slovenia, making up about 2.4 percent of the total population. The Muslim community of Slovenia is headed by Nedžad Grabus.

According to the published data from the 2002 Slovenian census, out of a total of 47,488 Muslims (2.4% of the total population) 2,804 Muslims (5.90% of the total Muslims in Slovenia) declared themselves as ethnic Slovenian Muslims.

There are also Muslims from Central, South and Southeast Asia, who are not counted in the census because they are migrant workers.

=== Judaism ===
The small Jewish community of Slovenia (Slovene: Judovska skupnost Slovenije) is estimated at 400 to 600 members, with the Jewish community of Slovenia suggesting 500 to 1000 members. Around 130 are officially registered, most of whom live in the capital, Ljubljana. The Jewish community was devastated by the Shoah, and has never fully recovered. Until 2003, Ljubljana was the only European capital city without a Jewish place of worship.

=== Hinduism ===
220 Hindus live in Slovenia, with 70 belonging to the Hindu Religious Community in Slovenia and 150 belonging to the International Society for Krishna Consciousness (Iskcon).

== Irreligion ==
=== Atheism ===
A 2010 Eurobarometer poll found that 26% of the population of Slovenia stated that "I don't believe there is any sort of spirit, God or life force". A 2021 World Population Review found that 53% of Slovenians were either non-religious or convinced atheist.

== Demographics ==
=== Censuses ===
Religiosity of Slovene citizens according to population censuses 1991, and 2002.

Religious group	Population % 1991	Population % 2002
Christianity	74.9%	61.1%
Catholicism	71.6%	57.8
Lutheran and other Protestants	0.8%	0.8%
Orthodox Christian	2.4%	2.3%
Islam	1.5%	2.4%
Other religion	0.0%	0.02%
Spiritual but not member of religions	0.2%	3.5%
Atheists	4.4%	10.1%
Agnostics	-	0.0%
Unknown	14.6%	7.1%
Not answered	0.0%	15.7%

=== Surveys ===
- Eurobarometer 2012 found about 68% of the population declaring to be Christian, with 64% being members of the Catholic Church. Members of other Christian denominations made up 4% of the population.
- International Social Survey Programme 2015 found that 64.3% of the population declared to be Christian, with Catholicism being the largest denomination accounting for 62.2% of the respondents, and Eastern Orthodoxy being the second-largest sect comprising 1.5%; members of other Christian denominations made up the 0.6%. A further 34.3% declared to have no religion, and 1.5% declared to belong to other religions.

== Religious freedom ==
Slovenia's laws guarantee the freedom of religion and establish a separation between church and state, as well as prohibiting religious discrimination and religious hatred. Religious groups may easily register with the government in order to receive some privileges, largely consisting of various forms of monetary compensation.

Slovenia's laws prohibit circumcision for non-medical reasons and animal slaughtering practices that are necessary for meat to be considered kosher or halal. Members of the Jewish and Muslim communities observe these practices outside of the country (importing meat, and traveling to neighboring countries for religious circumcision) without obstruction from Slovenia's government.

== See also ==
- Demographics of Slovenia
