= Milici =

Milici may refer to the following places:

- Milici, Italy
- Milići, Republika Srpska, Bosnia and Herzegovina
- Milići (Banovići), Bosnia and Herzegovina
- Milići (Sjenica), Serbia
- Milići, Slovenia

== See also ==
- Milic (disambiguation)
