= Milicevic =

Milicevic may refer to:

- Miličević
- Milićević
