= Milič =

Milič or Milíč may refer to:

- Jan Milíč (died 1374), Czech Catholic priest and Bohemian reformer
- Marko Milič (born 1977), Slovenian basketball player
- Milič Čapek (1909–1997), Czech–American philosopher

== See also ==
- Miliči
- Milic (disambiguation)
- Miličić
