= Serbs of White Carniola =

Ethnographic group of Serbs native to White Carniola

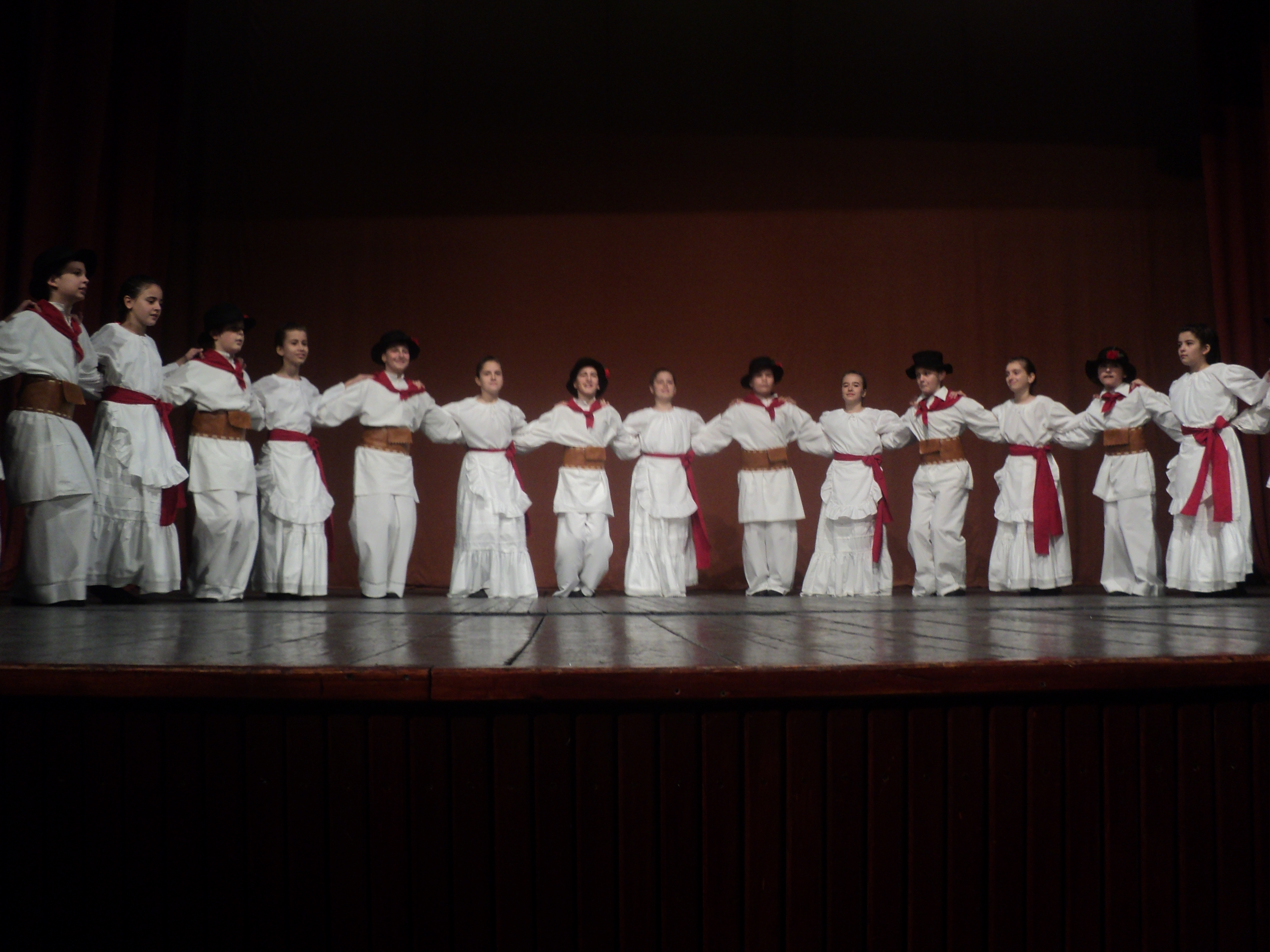
- Traditional dress

Regions with significant populations
- Črnomelj municipality: Bojanci, Marindol, Paunoviči, Adlešiči, Žuniči, Miliči

Languages
- Slovenian

Religion
- Predominantly Eastern Catholicism, minority Eastern Orthodoxy (Serbian Orthodox Church)

Apart from the immigrant community that makes up the vast majority of Serbs in Slovenia, there are a few villages in the southern region of White Carniola inhabited by descendants of Serbs (Uskoks) that fled from the Ottoman Empire in the 16th century. The community have been almost completely assimilated to their Slovene-speaking environment.

== History ==
With the Ottoman conquest of Serbian territories, groups of Serbs fled to the north or west; of the western migrational groups, some settled in White Carniola and Žumberak. In September 1597, with the fall of Slatina, some 1,700 Uskoks with their wives and children settled in Carniola, bringing some 4,000 sheep with them. The following year, with the conquest of Cernik, some 500 Uskoks families settled in Carniola. At the end of the 17th century, with the stagnation of Ottoman power due to European pressure during internal crisis, and Austrian advance far into Macedonia, Serbs armed themselves and joined the fight against the Ottomans; the Austrian retreat prompted another massive exodus of Serbs from the Ottoman territories in ca. 1690 (see Great Serb Migrations). In the area of White Carniola are mentioned Vlachs from Marindol in 1668. "die Walachen zu Marienthall beclagen sich"

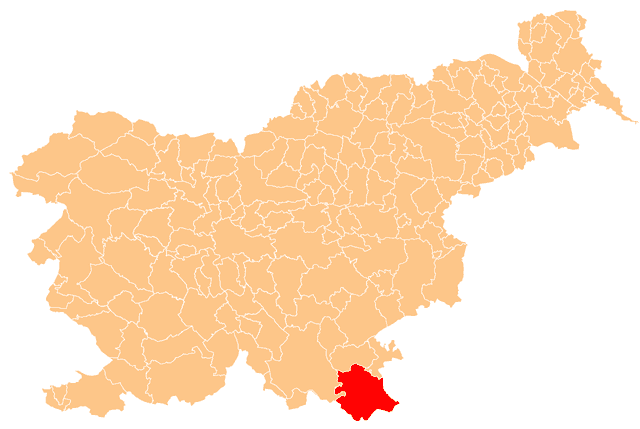
Location of Črnomelj municipality.

White Carniola, being the southernmost region of Slovenia, by the Kupa river, was also the northwesternmost Serbian linguistical island. Nowadays, the Serbian language is rarely heard in the last four villages in which descendants of Serb uskoks live: Bojanci, Marindol, Miliči and Paunoviči. In the other historical European–Ottoman frontier villages in the region, there are today Uniate (Eastern Catholic) and Catholicisated descendants of Serbs who only speak the Slovenian language.

The community had traditionally taken wives from other Serb communities, such as in nearby Gorski kotar (in Croatia). The first mixed marriage was recorded in Bojanci and White Carniola in 1947, and since then, Bojanci Serbs "seek wives in the Slovenian milieu". Before World War II, the gravestones were written in Serbian Cyrillic, while today, they are written in Serbian Latin. The assimilation of the White Carniolan Serbs continued, with a Serbian primary school being closed in 1992. In 1967, there was an estimated 500–600 Serbs in White Carniola. The number of Serb households shrunk by 300% during the 1980s, with a total number of 121 households in 1991.

== Culture ==
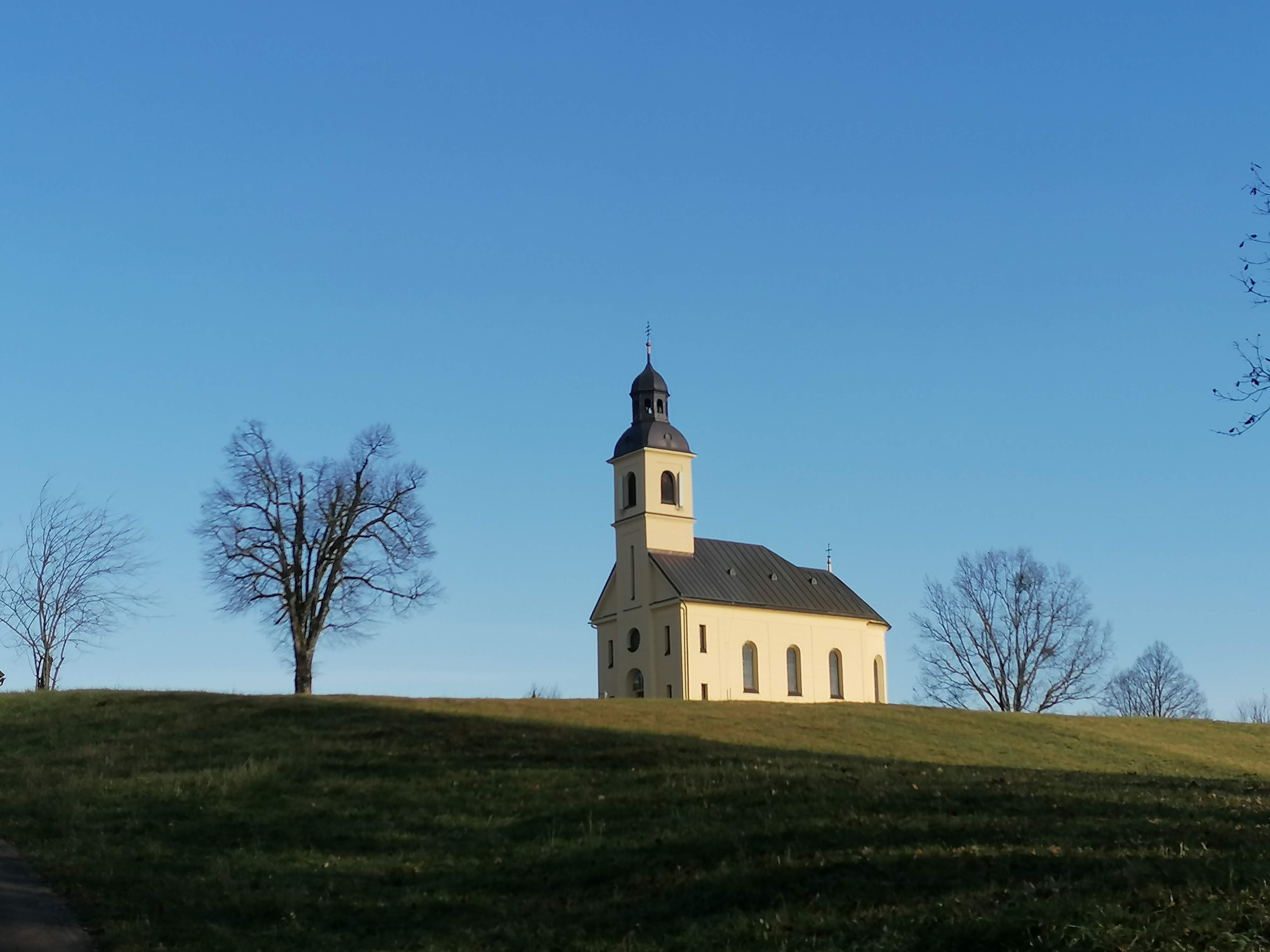
Church of Sts. Peter and Paul, Miliči

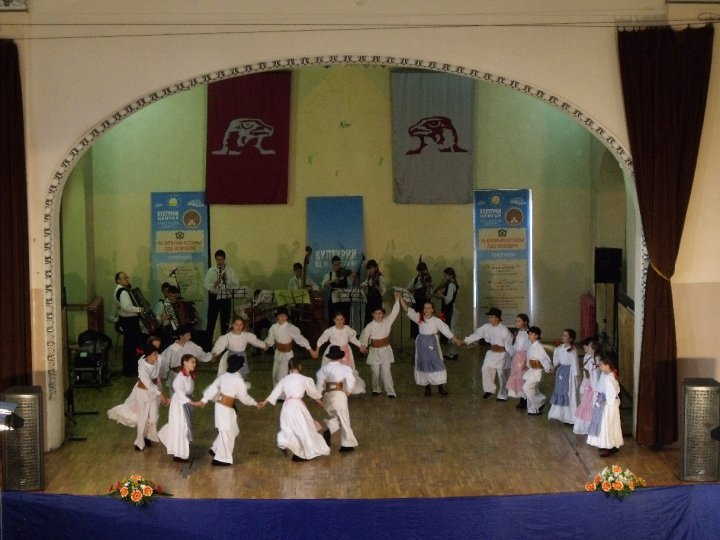
Traditional dance

Today, fewer than 200 individuals in White Carniola carry Serb ancestry, but they self-identify as Slovene. Gravestones now use Latin script (not Cyrillic), and villages like Miliči host mixed cultural festivals emphasizing regional Belokranjska identity over Serb roots.

=== Language ===
Serbian is "passively known" at best, heard in rare phrases like folk songs, but daily life is entirely Slovene.

=== Religion ===
Bojanci, Marindol, Miliči, and Paunoviči use to be predominantly Eastern Orthodox villages. The Serbian Orthodox Church gradually ceased to play any significant role in the area; Orthodox churches exist in Bojanci and Miliči, while the parish of Miliči include Marindol and Paunoviči. The churches have been without priests for a long time: Miliči had their priest until 1950, while nowadays the priest comes only for the biggest religious holidays from Moravice and Gomirje Monastery, both in neighboring Croatia. Serbian Orthodox churches in the area are:

- Church of the Beheading of St. John the Baptist in Bojanci
- Church of Sts. Peter and Paul in Miliči
- Church in Marindol

Many Serbs in White Carniola converted to Eastern Catholicism in the 17th and 18th century. Greek Catholic churches in the area are: Greek Catholic Churches in Slovenia

- Greek Catholic Church of Sts. Cyril and Methodius in Metlika
- Greek Catholic Church of St. Svetica in Drage

=== Folklore ===
In old folk poetry of White Carniola, Serbian hero Prince Marko is often mentioned, sung in "clean Shtokavian".

== Anthropology ==
Based on surnames found in White Carniola, it may be concluded that their ancestors were Serbs and Croats.

In Bojanci, the Serbs trace their origin to the families of Vrlinići (Sv. Đurđe), Radojčići (Sv. Nikola) and Kordići (Sv. Lazar).

=== Surnames ===
Surnames have been recorded since 1551.

- Mihaljević
- Vignjević
- Milić
- Vukmanović
- Dejanović
- Dmitrović
- Prijić
- Radosalić
- Stojić
- Vojnica
- Dragičević and Dragićević
- Stipanović
- Vidojević
- Bunjevac
- Mikunović
- Selaković
- Katić
- Jakovac
- Vukčević
- Paunović
- Kordić
- Radojčić
- Račić
- Vrlinić
- Radovitković
- Mirosaljac and Mirosaljić
- Žunić
- Vidnjević

== Notable people ==
- Radko Polič, actor

== See also ==
- Serbs in Slovenia

== Sources ==
- Warwick Armstrong; James Anderson (2007). Geopolitics of European Union Enlargement: The Fortress Empire. Routledge. ISBN 978-0-415-33939-1.
- Ivanović-Barišić, Milina (2010). "Srbi u Beloj Krajini". Traditiones 39/1.
- Petrović, Tanja (2008). Ni tamo, ni 'vamo. Belgrade: Balkan Institut.
- Petrović, Tanja (2002). "Ethno linguistic material regarding Christmas rituals among the Serbs in Bela Krajina". Južnoslovenski Filolog. 58 (58): 65–78. doi:10.2298/JFI0258065P. hdl:21.15107/rcub_dais_2934.
- Tanja Petrović; Dubravko Škiljan; Janez Justin (2005). Srbi u Beloj krajini: jezička ideologija i proces zamene jezika. T. Petrović.
- Christian Promitzer; Klaus-Jürgen Hermanik; Eduard Staudinger (2009). (Hidden) Minorities: Language and Ethnic Identity Between Central Europe and the Balkans. LIT Verlag Münster. pp. 157–. ISBN 978-3-643-50096-0.
- Stanovčić, Vojislav (2005) [2003]. Položaj i identitet srpske manjine u jugoistočnoj i centralnoj Evropi: zbornik radova sa naučnog skupa održanog 26-29. novembra 2003. godine. Srpska Akad. Nauka i Umetnosti. ISBN 9788670253889.
- Subašić, B. (2014-01-29). "Belu Krajinu nema ko da čuva" (in Serbian). Novosti.
- Inštitut za narodnostna vprašanja; Bešter, Romana; Komac, Miran; Medved, Felicita; Medvešek, Mojca; Pirc, Janez; Roter, Petra; Vrečer, Natalija (2014). Srbi v Beli krajini (in Slovenian). Narodna in univerzitetna knjižnica. ISBN 978-961-6159-50-0.
