= Church of Sts. Peter and Paul, Miliči =

Church of Sts. Peter and Paul
- Црква Светих Петра и Павла
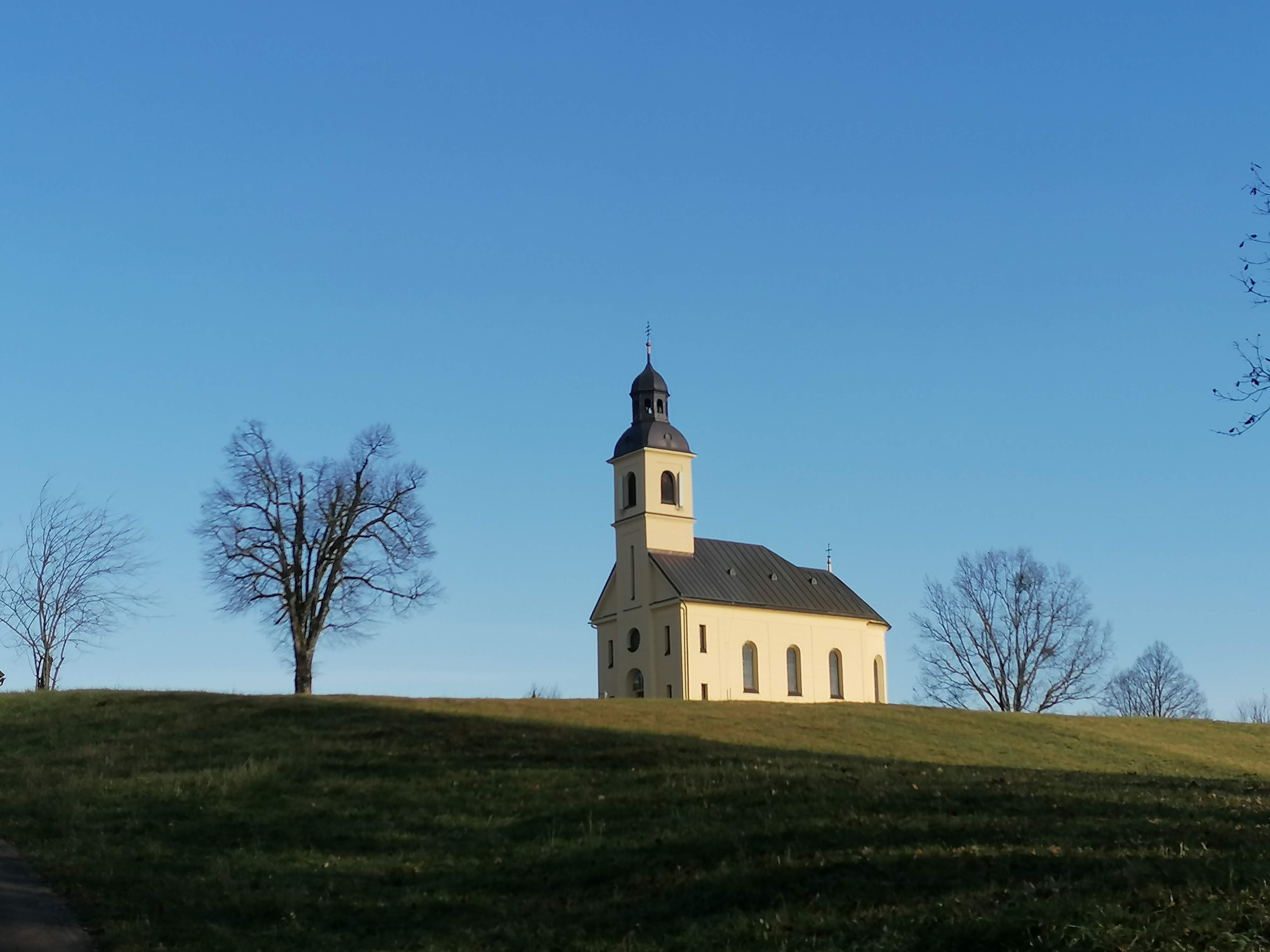
- Church of Sts. Peter and Paul
- Church of Sts. Peter and Paul
- 45°29′33″N 15°21′25″E
- Location: Miliči
- Country: Slovenia
- Denomination: Serbian Orthodox Church

History
- Dedication: Saint Peter and Paul the Apostle

Administration
- Archdiocese: Metropolitanate of Zagreb and Ljubljana

The Church of Sts. Peter and Paul (Serbian: Црква светих Петра и Павла, Slovene: Cerkev sv. Petra in Pavla) in Miliči is a Serbian Orthodox church in Slovenia. It is situated on a hill in the western part of the village at an elevation of 274 meters, offering view point towards neighbouring Croatia. The building is surrounded by linden trees. As the village does not have its own Orthodox priest, services are conducted by a priest from Gomirje Monastery in Croatia, who visits on major religious holidays.

== History ==
The Serbian Orthodox community has been present in the White Carniola for over 400 years. Historically, the community settled in the area during the Ottoman Empire conquests in Balkans. As of 2016, approximately 400 ethnic Serbs still lived in the region.

Miliči itself was established as an Uskoks village in White Carniola which together with nearby villages forms a small and distinct historic and cultural region inhabited by Serbs of White Carniola. These settlements were established during the organization of the Military Frontier system which at the time included the southern part of White Carniola.

The Orthodox Church in Miliči, built around 1856, is one of two Orthodox churches in the region.

The church underwent major renovations in 2016, including restoration of its roof and facade. Every year on 12 July, the Church of Sts. Peter and Paul in Miliči hosts the celebration of Petrovdan, the village Slava (patronal feast).

== Architecture ==
The Church of Sts. Peter and Paul, built in the mid-19th century, is a single-nave building with Neo-Romantic elements. It features a multi-section roof with a central gable oriented northwest–southeast, a bell tower on the northwest side, and an interior iconostasis made by the Jereb workshop in Metlika. A memorial plaque records the church's renovation, carried out by the Serbian Orthodox parish of Marindol with state support.

== Cemetery ==
About 800 meters from the church, a secluded fenced cemetery is located in the forest. According to oral tradition, the site was chosen by ancestors fleeing Ottoman attacks, who brought the remains of earlier generations for protection. The cemetery preserves wooden crosses and some 19th-century stone tombstones, with inscriptions primarily in Serbian Cyrillic and Latin scripts. The oldest stone grave belongs to forester Pavle Milić (1844–1911).

== See also ==
- Church of Sts. Cyril and Methodius, Ljubljana
