= Miličić =

Miličić (Cyrillic: Миличић) is a South Slavic surname. It may refer to:

- Aleksandar Miličić (1946–2021), Serbian football player and coach
- Ante Milicic (born 1974), Croatian-Australian football (soccer) player
- Bogdan Miličić, (born 1989), Serbian footballer
- Boris Miličić (born 1979), Serbian footballer
- Darko Miličić (born 1985), Serbian basketball player
- Dragoslav Miličić, Serbian entrepreneur and politician
- Igor Miličić (born 1976), Polish-Croatian basketball player and coach
- Igor Miličić Jr. (born 2002), Polish-Croatian basketball player of Philadelphia 76ers
- Neva Milicic Müller (born 1943), Chilean child psychologist

== See also ==
- Milič
