= Milic =

Milic may refer to:

- Milić, a Serbian given name and surname, and Croatian surname
- Milič, a Czech given name and a Slovene surname
- Milíč of Kroměříž (d. 1374), Czech Catholic priest
- Thomas Milic (born 2003), Canadian ice hockey goaltender

== See also ==
- Milicz
