= Gomirje Monastery =

Serbian Orthodox monastery near Vrbovsko, Croatia

Coordinates: 45°20′36.07″N 15°6′42.64″E

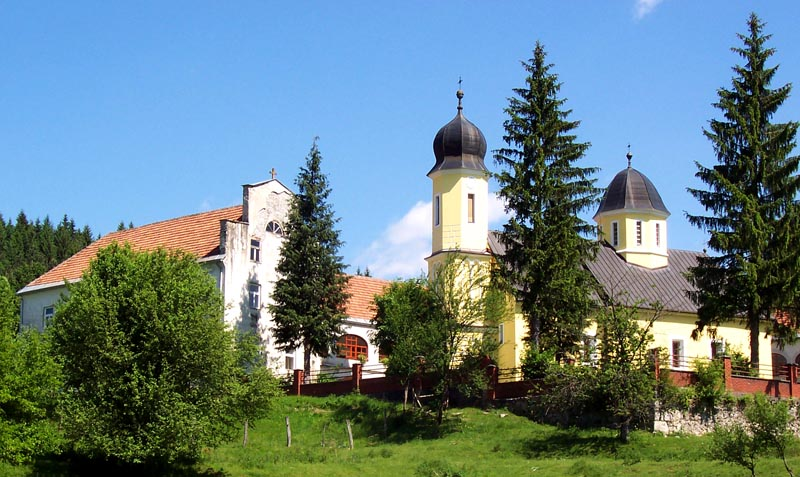
- Gomirje Monastery
- Interactive map of Gomirje Monastery

Monastery information
- Order: Serbian Orthodox Church
- Established: 1600
- Dedication: John the Baptist
- Diocese: Eparchy of Gornji Karlovac

Site
- Location: near Gomirje, Croatia
- Public access: Yes

Gomirje Monastery (Serbian: Манастир Гомирје, romanized: Manastir Gomirje) is a Serbian Orthodox monastery in Croatia. It is the westernmost Serb Orthodox monastery, located in the western part of Croatia near the village of Gomirje, near the town of Ogulin. The monastery is thought to have been founded in 1600. The monastery includes the church of Roždenije saint John the Baptist, built in 1719.

== History ==
=== Congregation's and Monastery's early years ===
Gomirje Monastery was built in the period of the first larger Serb settling in the villages of Gomirje, Vrbovsko and Moravice at the end of 16th and the beginning of the 17th century. In 1600 nobleman Juraj Frankopan, brother of the Vuk II Krsto Frankopan, have granted right of "the eternal procuration" of depopulated village of Gomirje to the 325 Serb refugees from Udbina and Korenica which at the time were under the control of the Ottoman Empire. According to one source relayed by Fras, 3 monks arrived, Auxentios Branković, Bessarion Vučković and Mardarios Orlović, who together laid the foundation stone of the monastery in 1601. In another account, one monk arrived together with settlers and in the 1600-1602 period settlers have build one small wooden chapel for him to serve religious services which will serve as the corner stone of the future monastery.

The first conflict with the members of Frankopan family surfaced in the following years when Frankopan's wanted to turn settlers into serfs while settlers claimed rights of the Grenzer or 'Frontiersmen' of the Croatian Military Frontier. In 1602 settlers' mission asked for protection from the Archduke Ferdinand, and in 1608 they asked once again either for protection or resettlement. In 1615 most of the settlers moved away to the Slavonian Military Frontier with only 40 families remaining in Gomirje. In 1621 Vuk II Krsto Frankopan erected one observation tower beside the monastery to control Ottoman movements in the region. In 1617 Gomirje's remaining settlers complained once again through their emissaries in Graz and the entire conflict was not resolved until the year of 1657 when settlers redeemed rights on land of the Gomirje area and defined its boundaries enclosing 419 1/3 yokes of land and what the Mamula family had granted the monastery, in return for four years of annual fee of 15,000 Forints. 1657 Agreement granted part of the land to the Gomirje Monastery and it was confirmed by the Holy Roman Emperor Leopold I. Emperor Leopold I confirmed this grant on 19 October 1661.

As the old monk could not work as the military chaplain settlers invited 6 or 7 new monks from the Krka Monastery who established first wooden Monastery of John the Baptist surrounded with a small property which was increased over the years through purchasing and endowments. At one point Monastery even owned a port in Senjska Draga near the town of Senj. Its monks served in the Gomirje, Vrbovsko, Moravice, Drežnica, Ponikve, Ravna Gora, Jasenak, Tuk, Mrkpolje, as well Marindol and Bojanci in modern-day Slovenia. They served around Žumberak at the times when there was no orthodox priests, but in this they faced resistances from the mid 18th century. In 1719 wooden church was replaced with the one built by stone which was completed in 1730.

=== Resistance to Uniatism ===
Uniatist efforts of the Roman Catholic Church supported by the authorities intensified in the later part of the second half of the 17th century after decision was taken to transfer seats of eparchies from monasteries to towns. Monks at the Gomirje Monastery provided resistance to the efforts of pro-unitarist bishop Pavle Zoričić resulting in arrests, mistreatment and dungeon sentences. In 1672 group of 14 monks from Gomirje, Marča and Lepavina Monastery were clipped and sentenced to heavy work in shackles as reptiles on galleys or stone carriers in the project of erection of Malta Fortress. In 1750 Gomirje monks were expelled from the Žumberak Mountains. At the time Gomirje resisted uniatist efforts through the activities of the bishop Danilo Jakšić and the generous help in secular and religious books which it received from the Russian Orthodox Church.

=== 1781 Patent of Toleration ===
In 1789, the monastery was devastated by fires and subsequently rebuilt in 1791. In 1810, future metropolitan of Sremski Karlovci, Serbian Patriarch and administrator of Serbian Vojvodina Josif Rajačić became a monk in Gomirje. In 1811, Sava Mrkalj joined the monastic order for two years until he decided to leave Gomirje Monastery in 1813.

=== 19th century ===
In 1885, the monastery petitioned the Sabor for 600 forint related to the parishes in Gomirje, Drežnik and Ponikve.

=== 20th century ===
It has been claimed that the plunder of the monastery was done on the order of Ogulin priest Ivan Mikan, but this is unlikely. On 9 June 1941, according to the memory of the sole surviving Gomirje monk, father Nektarije Dazgić, the Ustaše arrived by surprise from Ogulin in a truck, besieged the monastery, drove the monks into their cells and questioned them about money and the keys to the monastery coffers. After beating them, they transported them to Ogulin. Any remaining monks of Gomirje were arrested in late June and early July. In early July, the hegumen and four monks had not yet been sent away. As of a 15 July document, all Orthodox priests from Gomirje had been sent to concentration camps. At Danica, Dazgić recalled seeing almost the entire ecclesiastical court of Plaški, and a total of more than 30 priests.

During World War I, Austria-Hungary turned Gomirje Monastery into concentration camp for Serbian Orthodox priests from the Triune Kingdom and areas of Vojvodina. The monastery library and collections were professionally organized in 1938 with the expert advice from the Museum of Arts and Crafts, Zagreb. During the World War II, the Ustaše government of the Independent State of Croatia killed monastery monks and took all of the monastery's valuable possessions to Zagreb, while the complex itself was burned in 1943. The monastery was reopened in 1967.

The 2,650 square metres (28,500 ft^{2}) garden around the monastery dates to the second half of the 20th century.

In 2020, the castle in Severin was used along with the castles in Stara Sušica and Severin na Kupi as a filming location for the music video of the županija anthem.

== See also ==
- List of Serbian Orthodox monasteries
