= Miličević =

Miličević (pronounced [milǐːt͡ʃevit͡ɕ]) may refer to:

- Branislav Miličević (born 1983), Serbian football defender who currently plays for Start
- David Miličević (born 1992), Croatian handballer
- Hrvoje Miličević (born 1993), Bosnian footballer
- Ivana Miličević (born 1974), American actress of Croatian ethnicity
- Ljubo Miličević (born 1981), Australian football (soccer) player of Croatian ethnicity
- Nikola Miličević (1887–1963), Croatian monk and amateur astronomer, also the eponym of:
  - 10241 Miličević, main belt asteroid with an orbital period of 5.32 years
- Paskoje Miličević Mihov (died 1516), Croatian local builder
- Tomo Miličević (born 1979), lead guitarist in the L.A.-based alternative rock band 30 Seconds to Mars of Croatian ethnicity

== See also ==
- Milićević
- Miličić
