= Dragoslav Miličić =

Serbian entrepreneur and politician

Dragoslav Miličić (Serbian Cyrillic: Драгослав Миличић) is a Serbian entrepreneur and former politician. He served in the assembly of the Federal Republic of Yugoslavia from 1993 to 1996. A prominent opponent of Slobodan Milošević's government in the 1990s, Miličić was at different times a member of the Serbian Renewal Movement (Srpski pokret obnove, SPO) and the Democratic Party (Demokratska stranka, DS).

== Business career ==
Miličić is a construction technician by training. He is an investor in the construction sector and is the co-owner of the "IG Group" along with Radiša Jovičić. This company purchased the Goša factory in Simićevo when it was privatized in 2004; the factory was recognized as the largest exporter among Serbia's small and medium-sized businesses in 2012. By 2021, however, it had fallen on difficult times, and its members were considering bankruptcy proceedings.

== Politician ==
Miličić joined the Serbian Renewal Movement when multi-party politics was re-introduced to Serbia in 1990. He ran for the party in Smederevska Palanka's first division in the 1990 Serbian parliamentary election and was defeated by a candidate of the governing Socialist Party of Serbia (Socijalistička partija Srbije, SPS).

The Federal Republic of Yugoslavia (FRY) was established in April 1992, comprising the republics of Serbia and Montenegro. The SPO contested the December 1992 Yugoslavian parliamentary election as part of the Democratic Movement of Serbia (Demokratski pokret Srbije, DEPOS); Miličić appeared in the lead position on the coalition's electoral list for the Smederevo division and was elected when the list won two seats.

Miličić was close to SPO leader Vuk Drašković during this time and was identified as the SPO's most important financial backer. In 1993, he told the journal Politika that he had built the SPO's headquarters in Belgrade and given it to the party free of charge. This relationship broke down in the summer of 1994, however; Miličić resigned from his position in the SPO leadership, accusing Drašković and his wife of using the party for personal financial gain. He later left the SPO entirely and joined the Democratic Party.

The SPO and the Democratic Party joined forces in the opposition Together (Zajedno) coalition prior to the 1996 Yugoslavian parliamentary election. The DS planned to nominate Miličić for re-election on the coalition's list in Smederevo; the SPO raised objections to the nomination of SPO-to-DS crossovers, however, and the matter threatened to scupper the coalition arrangement entirely. Ultimately, the DS agreed to withdraw Miličić's candidacy and those of other former SPO members. Miličić left the DS in the aftermath of these developments, although he remained a supporter of Zajedno.

In 1997, Miličić held discussions with Drašković about the prospect of rejoining the SPO. He set a number of conditions on his return, including the internal party reform and the survival of the Zajedno coalition. Ultimately, the talks were not successful. In the same period, Miličić indicated that he would favour Milan Panić as a united opposition candidate in the 1997 Serbian presidential election. This too did not occur; the opposition did not remain united, and Panić was not a candidate.

Miličić has largely withdrawn from active politics since the fall of Slobodan Milošević in 2000. He fielded his own electoral list in Smederevska Palanka in the 2004 Serbian local elections; the list won two mandates, although his name did not appear on a list of local assembly members in late 2005.

== Electoral record ==
=== National Assembly of Serbia ===
1990 Serbian parliamentary election: Smederevska Palanka 1
| Candidate | Party |
|---|---|
| Vladimir Vojinović | Democratic Party |
| Predrag Gačić | People's Peasant Party |
| Petar Dević | Citizens' Group |
| Dragoslav Miličić | Serbian Renewal Movement |
| Dr. Marija Mihajlović (***WINNER***) | Socialist Party of Serbia |
Total
