= Milićević =

Milićević (pronounced [milǐːt͡ɕevit͡ɕ]) may refer to:

- Branko Milićević (born 1946), Serbian actor popular for his roles in children's TV shows
- Danijel Milićević (born 1986), Bosnian footballer
- Dejan Milićević, Macedonian-born Serbian music video director and fashion photographer
- Ksenia Milicevic (born 1942), French painter, architect and town planner
- Milan Đ. Milićević (1831–1908), Serbian writer of the Romanticism period
- Ognjenka Milićević (1927–2008), Serbian director, acting professor, and theatre expert

== See also ==
- Miličević
- Milić
