= Bojanci =

- Interactive map of Bojanci
- Location in Slovenia
- Coordinates: 45°30′6.39″N 15°14′37.96″E
- Country: Slovenia
- Traditional region: White Carniola
- Statistical region: Southeast Slovenia
- Municipality: Črnomelj

Area
  - Total: 7.56 km^{2} (2.92 sq mi)
- Elevation: 269.7 m (885 ft)

Population (2020)
  - Total: 86
  - Density: 11/km^{2} (29/sq mi)
- Postal code: 8344

Bojanci (pronounced [bɔˈjaːntsi]; German: Bojanze) is a village in the Municipality of Črnomelj in the White Carniola area of southeastern Slovenia. The area is part of the traditional region of Lower Carniola and is now included in the Southeast Slovenia Statistical Region.

== Name ==
Bojanci was attested in 1674 as Dorff Woianze. The name is derived from the Slavic hypocorism Bojanъ, derived from the name Bojeslavъ (literally, 'he that wins fame through battle'). Like similar names (e.g., Bojanja Vas), the plural name thus means 'inhabitants of Bojan's village'. In the past the German name was Bojanze.

== History ==
The village was established by Serbs that had joined the Uskok bands when fleeing Ottoman persecution (see Serbs of White Carniola). Bojanci is unique among the Serb-inhabited settlements because history records its foundation as taking place precisely in 1593. The village was founded by Montenegrin Serbs from the region of the Bojana river, who, following the end of the War of Cyprus, in which they participated on the Venetian side, settled first in Dalmatia, and then again, after the outbreak of the Long Turkish War, in White Carniola.

== Church ==
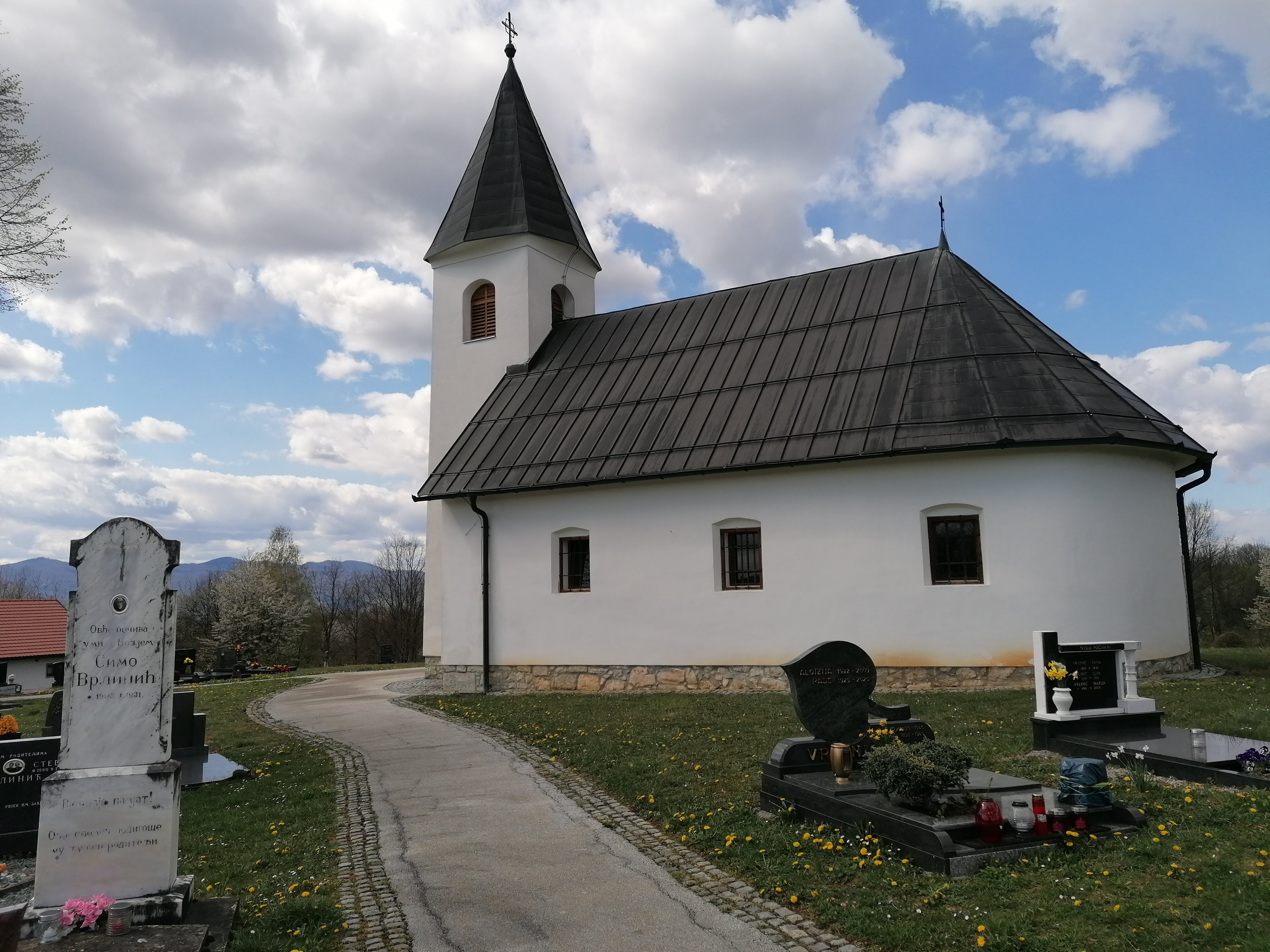
Beheading of Saint John the Baptist Church

The local church is thus a Serbian Orthodox Church, dedicated to the Beheading of St. John the Baptist. It dates to the late 18th century, when it replaced its wooden predecessor.

== Demographics ==
According to the 1991 census:

- Serbs: 47 (46.1%)
- Slovenes: 18 (17.6%)
- Yugoslavs: 14 (13.7%)
- ethnic Muslims: 3 (2.9%)
- Croats: 1 (1.0%)
- Unknown: 19 (18.6%)
