= Serbs in Slovenia =

Srbi v Sloveniji Срби у Словенији Srbi u Sloveniji
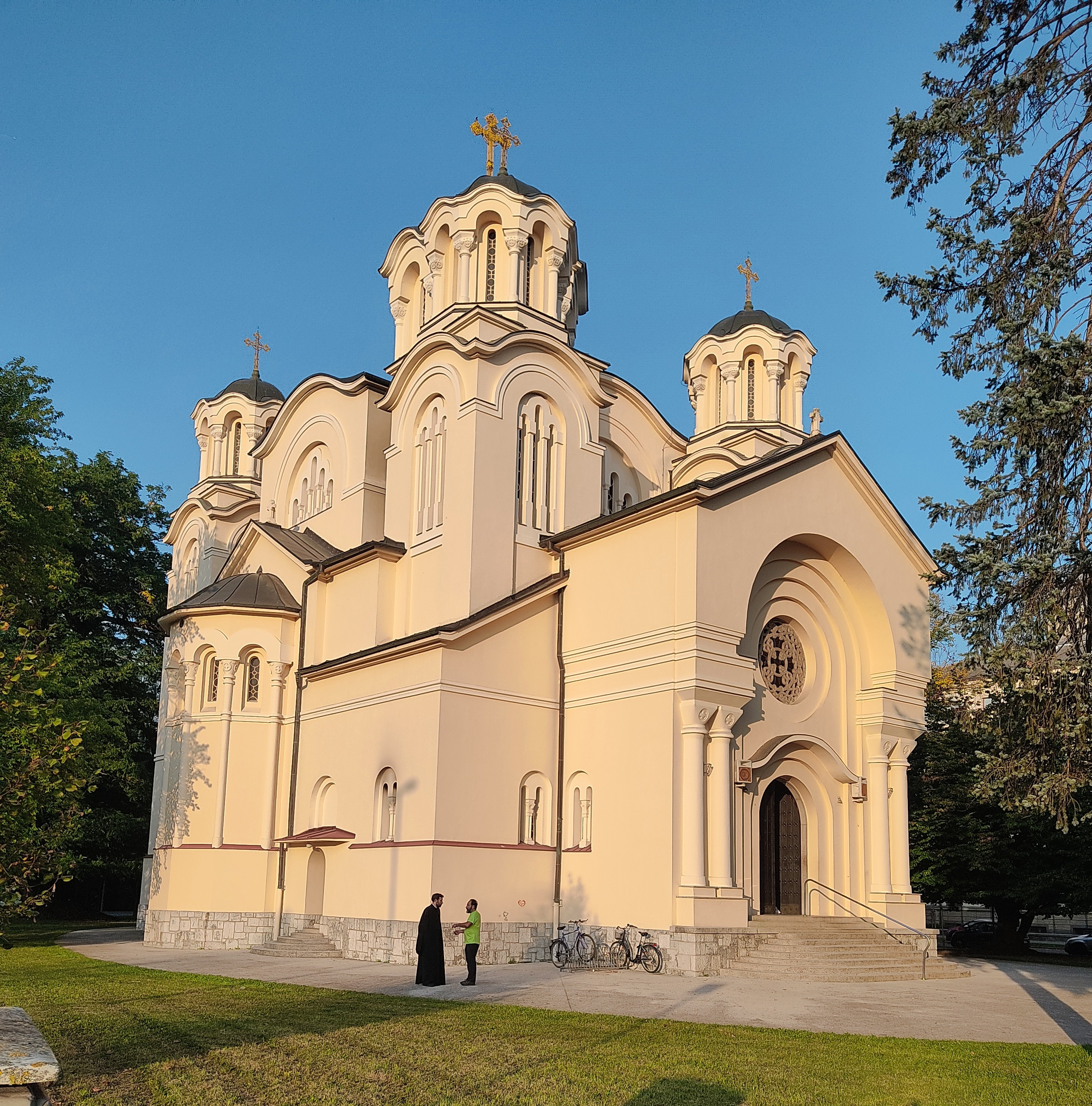
- Serbian Orthodox Church of Sts. Cyril and Methodius in Ljubljana

Total population
- 30,248 Serbia-born residents (2021) 38,964 ethnic Serbs (2002)

Regions with significant populations
- Ljubljana, Maribor, Celje, Jesenice, Koper

Languages
- Slovenian and Serbian

Religion
- Eastern Orthodoxy (Serbian Orthodox Church)

Serbs in Slovenia are Slovenian citizens of ethnic Serb descent and Serbian citizens living in Slovenia. According to data from 2021 census, there were 30,248 Serbia-born people living in Slovenia, while according to data from 2002 census (the last census ethnicity was recorded) there were 38,964 Serbs, constituting 2% of the total population and making Serbs the second-largest ethnic group in the country.

== History ==
Although there existed an indigenous community from the 16th century of Serbs of White Carniola (which have been completely assimilated having lost any distinct Serb ethnic identity by the second half of 20th century), the modern Serbs in Slovenia are first- and second-generation immigrants.

Serbs came to Slovenia from countries of former Yugoslavia during its existence, mostly after the World War II and primarily from Bosnia and Herzegovina and Serbia. Many Serbs employed in the Yugoslav People's Army were stationed in the Socialist Republic of Slovenia with their families. In the 1970s and 1980s, there was a spike in Serb immigration many ethnic Serbs as they migrated to pursue better careers and economic opportunities in Slovenia, the most developed of then-Yugoslav republics. During the socialist period, Serbs in Slovenia were heavily involved in the League of Communists of Slovenia, and nearly one in four ethnic Serbs in the republic was a party member by 1981.

In 2013, the combined community association of Serbs in Slovenia requested that Serbs be given the status of a recognized ethnic minority. They have not been granted minority status however, since, according to the Slovenian constitutional framework, only "historical minorities who have been living on clearly defined territories for centuries can have the status of a minority".

== Demographics ==
According to data from the 2002 census, which was the last census ethnicity was recorded, 38,964 people stated that they were of Serb ethnicity. Serbs are concentrated in the largest cities: Ljubljana, Maribor, Celje, Koper, and Jesenice.

Year	Population	Share
1948	7,048	0.5%
1953	11,225	0.8%
1961	13,609	0.9%
1971	20,521	1.2%
1981	42,182	2.3%
1991	47,097	2.5%
2002	38,964	2.0%

Serbs belong to the Eastern Orthodoxy with the Serbian Orthodox Church (through its Metropolitanate of Zagreb and Ljubljana) as the traditional church.

== Culture ==
Yugo-nostalgia is strong among the older generation of Serbs in Slovenia. The Serb immigrant community in Slovenia had developed a "Balkan culture" in the 1990s. The Leskovac-styled grilled meat, including ćevapčići, have nowadays become part of the daily diet in Slovenia.

According to data from the 2022 census, most Serbs use Slovene as their language of communication, since only 4,300 people declared that they use only the Serbian language at home, while about 15,000 declared they use both languages at home. However more than 31,000 people declared their mother tongue as Serbian. A mixed Slovenian–Serbian slang, srboslovenščina, became an "unofficial" language in football and construction, among other traditional domains of immigrants from former Yugoslavia.

== Notable people ==
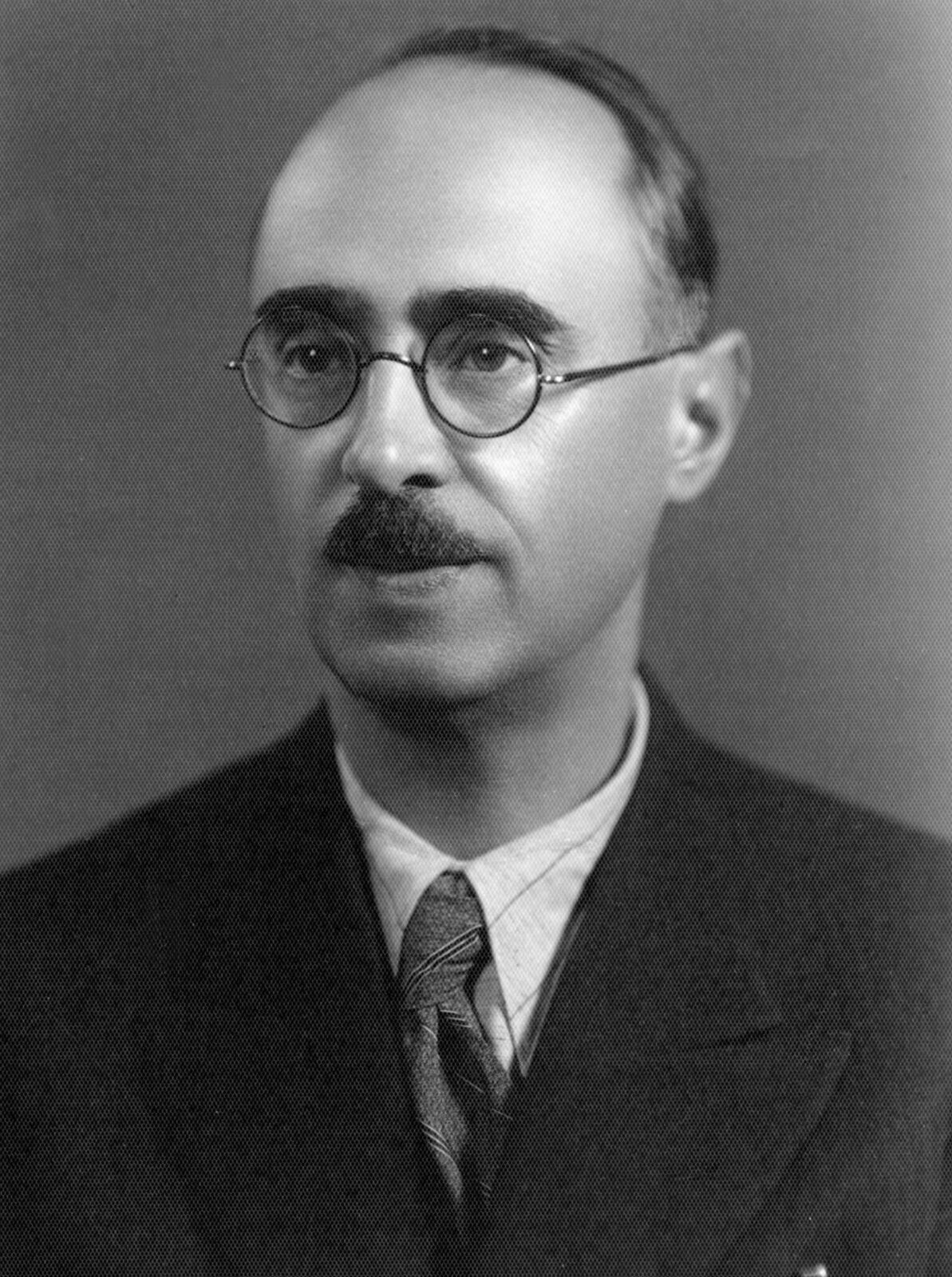
Jovan Hadži

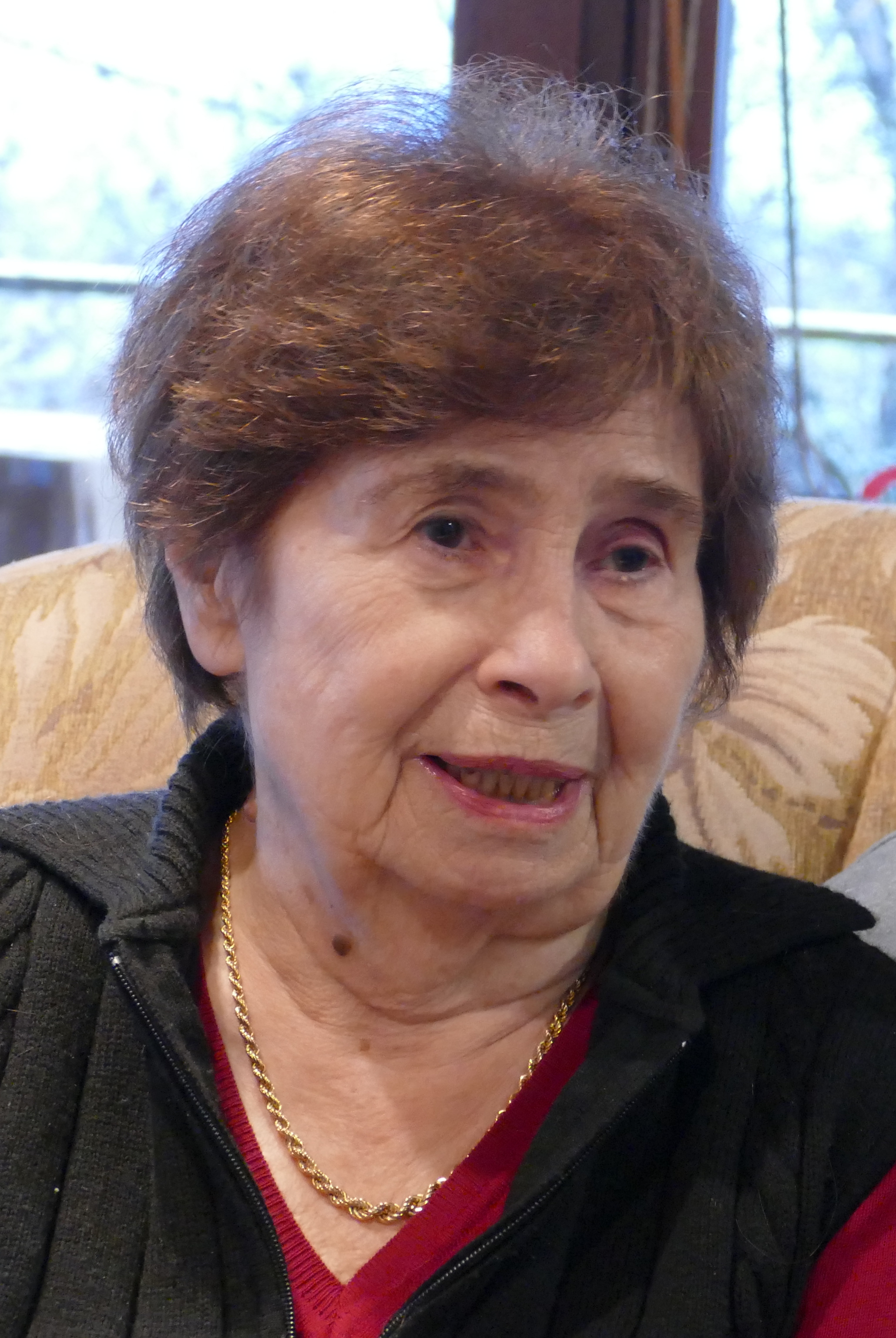
Spomenka Hribar

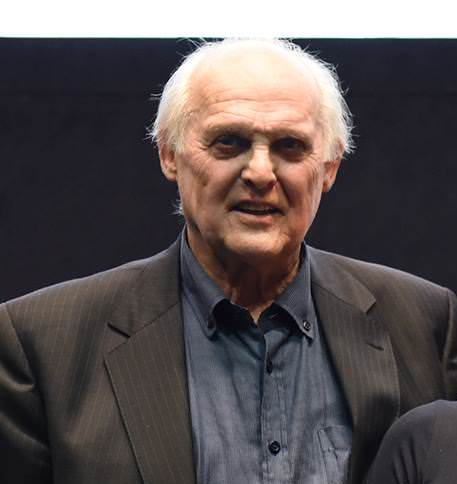
Radko Polič

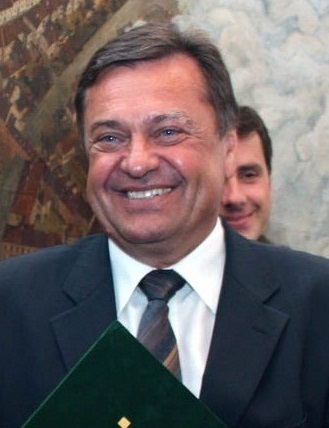
Zoran Janković

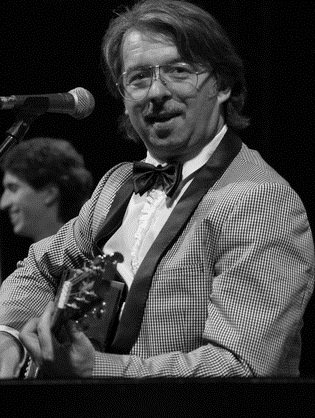
Magnifico

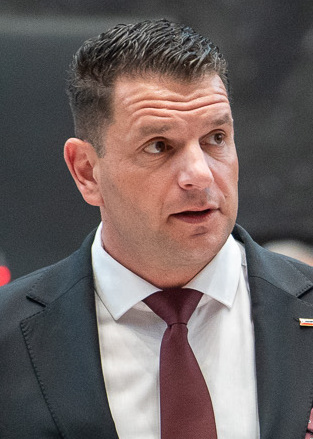
Zoran Stevanović

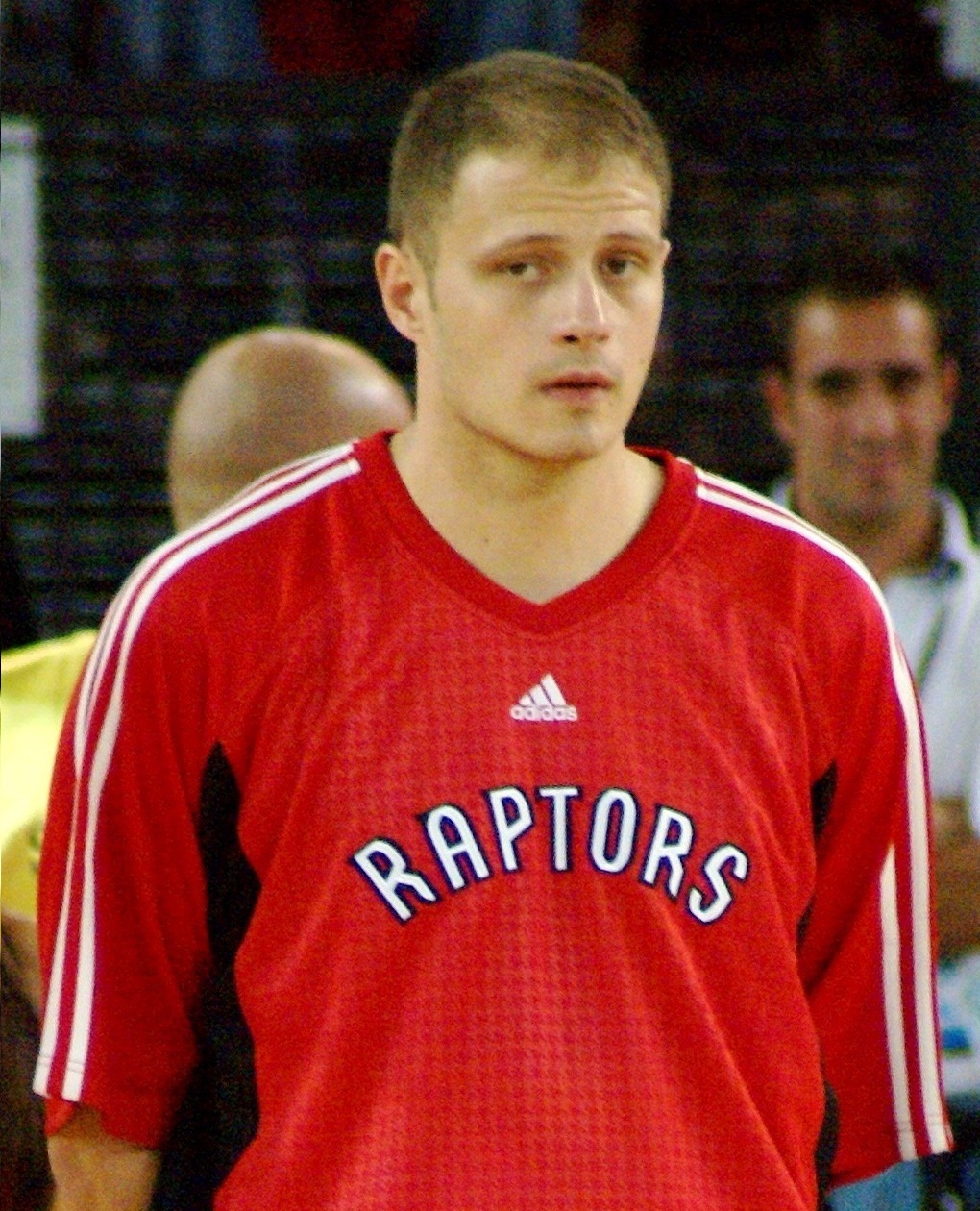
Rasho Nesterović

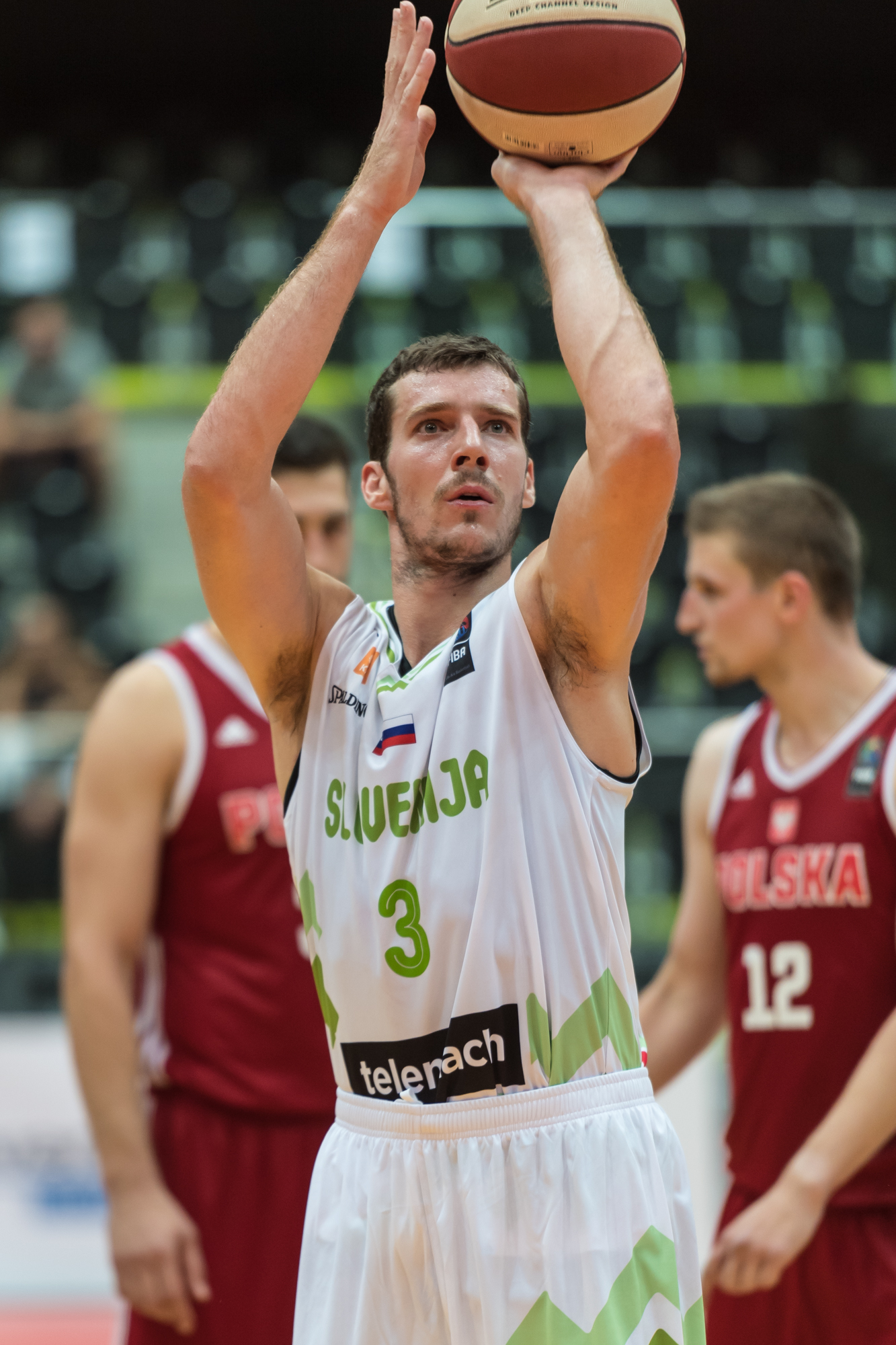
Goran Dragić

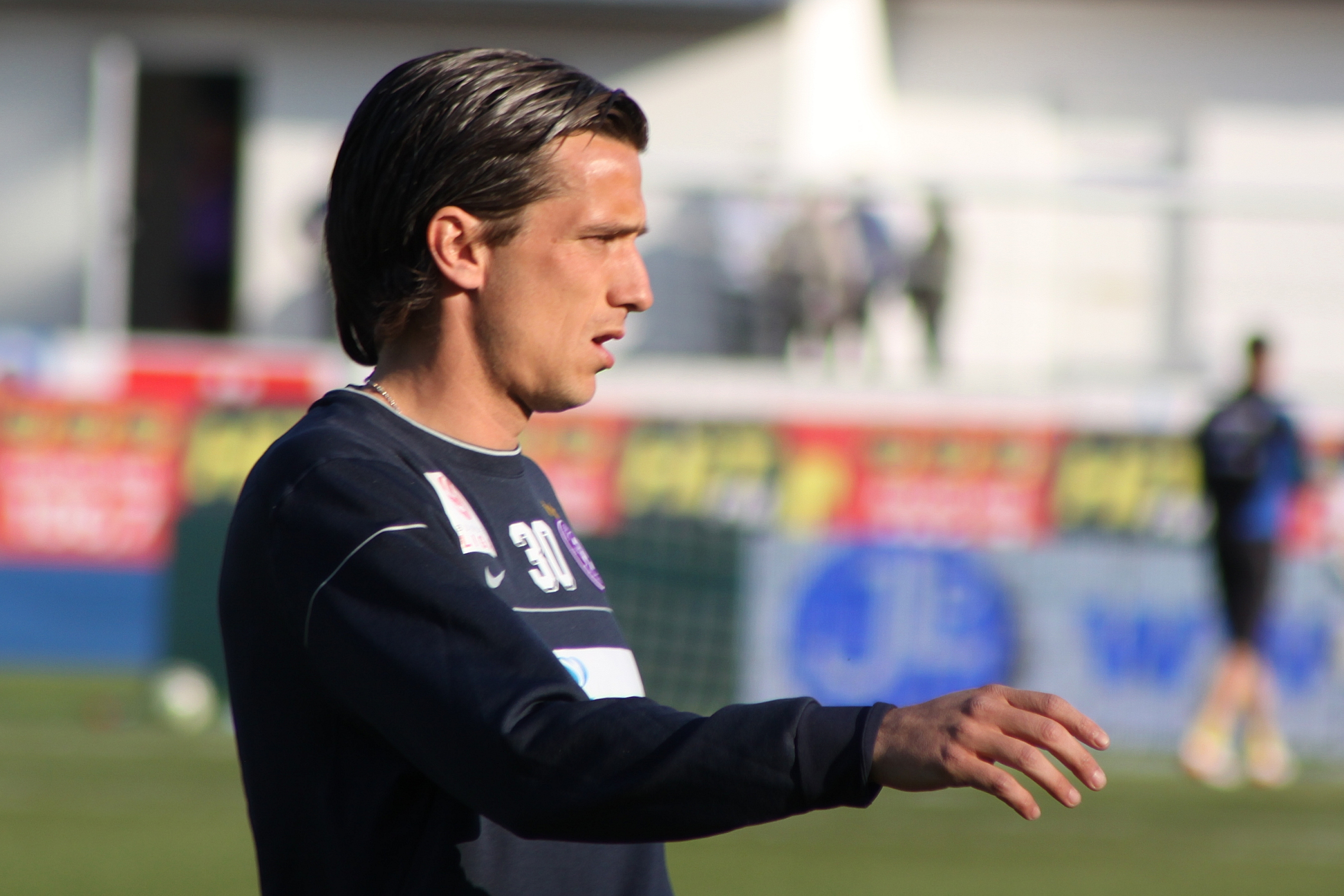
Milenko Ačimovič

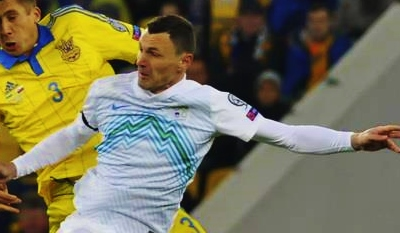
Milivoje Novaković

- Milenko Ačimovič – football player
- Ilija Arnautović – architect
- Katarina Branković – Countess of Celje
- Luka Dončić – basketball player, paternal Serb descent
- Saša Dončić – basketball player and coach
- Goran Dragić – basketball player
- Zoran Dragić – basketball player
- Jovan Hadži – zoologist
- Spomenka Hribar – sociologist and politician, paternal Serb descent
- Sara Isaković – swimmer, paternal Serb descent
- Zoran Janković – politician, mayor of Ljubljana
- Bojan Jokić – football player
- Dušan Jovanović – theatre director and playwright
- Irena Kazazić – painter and writer
- Magnifico – musician, paternal Serb descent
- Marko Milič – basketball player, paternal Serb descent
- Rasho Nesterovič – basketball player
- Milivoje Novakovič – football player
- Jan Oblak – football player, maternal Serb descent
- Radko Polič – film director
- Božidar Rašica – architect, scenographer and painter
- Simona Škrabec – author, paternal Serb descent
- Zoran Stevanović, politician, President of the National Assembly of Slovenia
- Slaviša Stojanovič – football manager
- Dejan Vinčić – volleyball player

== See also ==
- Immigration to Slovenia
- Serb diaspora
- Serbia–Slovenia relations
- Metropolitanate of Zagreb and Ljubljana

== Sources ==
- Vojislav Stanovčić (2005). Položaj i identitet srpske manjine u jugoistočnoj i centralnoj Evropi: zbornik radova sa naučnog skupa održanog 26-29. novembra 2003. godine. Srpska Akad. Nauka i Umetnosti. ISBN 9788670253889.
- Prelić, Mladena (2009). "The Serbs in Slovenia: A new minority". Glasnik Etnografskog instituta SANU. 57 (2): 53–68. doi:10.2298/GEI0902053P. hdl:21.15107/rcub_dais_8771.
- Resic, Sanimir; Törnquist-Plewa, Barbara (2016). The Balkans in Focus: Cultural Boundaries in Europe. Nordic Academic Press. ISBN 978-91-87121-71-5.
