= Neva Milicic Müller =

Chilean child psychologist

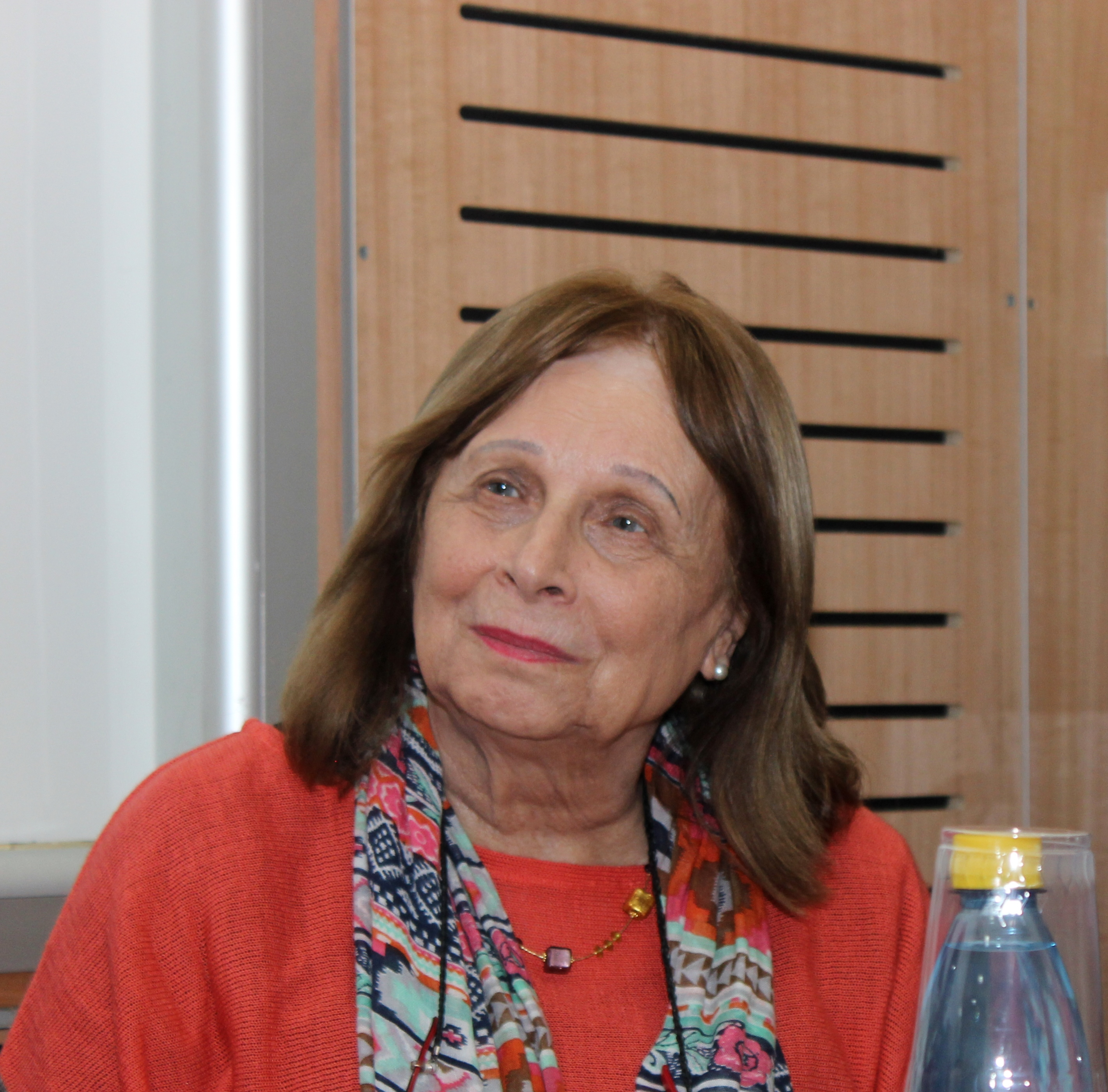
- Born: 1943 (age 81–82); Santiago, Chile
- Education: Pontifical Catholic University of Chile; University of Wales
- Occupation: Child psychologist
- Years active: 1967–present
- Children: 4

Neva Milicic Müller (born 1943) is a Chilean child psychologist, known for her publications of children's books and her academic work. She was named an emerita professor at the Pontifical Catholic University of Chile in 2014.

== Biography ==
Neva Milicic Müller was born in Santiago, Chile in 1943. Milicic Müller has a Bachelor of Arts degree in psychology (1967) and a Masters of Education (1974) from Pontifical Catholic University of Chile. She later received her Ph.D. from the University of Wales in 1982.

Milicic Müller currently resides in Chile where she is married and has 4 children.

== Teaching and professional activities ==
From 1968 to 1974, Milicic Müller worked as a child psychologist in the psychiatric service at the Luis Calvo Mackenna Hospital (Spanish: Hospital Luis Calvo Mackenna). She then taught as an associate professor of special education at the Pontifical Catholic University of Chile from 1969 until 1982. In 1971, she started teaching as a professor at the university's School of Psychology. From 1990 to 1999 she served as a consultant in the National Commission of Science and Technology (CONICYT) which is a part of the Scientific and Technological Development Support Fund (FONDEF), where she created the FONDEF of Education later in 2010.

In 1994, Milicic Müller acted as a consultant for UNESCO to help develop an education plan for populations at risk of violence. Milicic Müller returned to work at the Pontifical Catholic University of Chile as the post-graduate deputy director for the School of Psychology from 1995 until 2000.

Milicic Müller worked as Director of the government funded organization Fundación Integra in 1995 (under the government of Eduardo Frei Ruiz-Tagle).

Between 2012 and 2013 Milicic Müller served as the director of the honors program at the School of Psychology. Because of her continuous work at the Pontifical Catholic University of Chile, Milicic Müller was given the title of Emerita Professor in 2014.

== Recent work ==
Milicic Müller's recent book Nos separamos, ¿y los niños? (English: We are separated. What about the children?), with Oriana Cifuentes, is about caring for children during periods of separation like that which has occurred during quarantine for the COVID-19 pandemic.

In an interview with Un Dia Perfecto from Radio PAUTA, Milicic Müller spoke about the importance of social contact and communication for children, especially as it involves interacting with parents, peers, learning environments, and emotional development. She went on to discuss how periods of separation can also be important to facilitate growth and independence, but that families and periods of separation are unique.

Milicic Müller also has a weekly column called Escuela para Padres in the Ya magazine run by El Mercurio newspaper.

== Memberships and scientific societies ==
Part of the following collectives:

- International Academy for Research in Learning Disabilities
- Chilean Society of Clinical Psychology (Spanish: Sociedad Chilena de Psicología Clínica)
- School of Psychologists (Spanish: Colegio de Psicólogos)
- International Association of Special Education

Member of the following associations:

- Society of Educational Psychologists (Spanish: Sociedad Psicólogos Educacionales)
- International Reading Association
- Association for Child Psychology and Psychiatry
- International Academy of Research in Learning Disabilities
- Chilean Reading Association (Spanish: Asociación Chilena de Lectura)
- Board of International Journal of Special Education

== Selected awards and recognition ==
- Sergio Yulis Award (Chilean Society of Clinical Psychology, 1992) (Spanish: Premio Sergio Yulis (Sociedad Chilena de Psicología Clínica))
- Award for Academic Excellence (Pontifical Catholic University of Chile, 2011) (Spanish: Premio a la Excelencia Académica (Pontificia Universidad Católica de Chile))
- Emeritus Professor (Pontifical Catholic University of Chile, 2014) (Spanish: Profesora Emérita (Pontificia Universidad Católica de Chile))
- Woman of the 21st Century (University of the Pacific, 2014)) (Spanish: Premio Mujeres del siglo XXI(Universidad del Pacífico))

== Research and publications ==
=== Selected academic articles ===
- Milicic, N. (2000). Clima sociales tóxicos y climas sociales nutritivos para el desarrollo personal en el contexto escolar. Psykhe, 9(2), 117–124.
- Alcalay, L., Flores, A., Milicic, N., Portales, J. & Torretti, A. (2003). Familia y Escuela. ¿Una alianza possible? Una mirada desde la perspectiva de los estudiantes. Psykhe, 12(2), 101–110.
- Bravo, L., Milicic, N., Cuadros, A., Mejía, L. & Eslava, J. (2009). Trastornos de Aprendizaje: Investigaciones psicológicas y Psicopedagógicas en diversos países de Sud América. Revista de Ciencias Psicológicas, III(2), 203–218.
- Berger, C., Álamos, P., Milicic, N. & Alcalay, L. (2013). Rendimiento académico y las dimensiones personal y contextual del aprendizaje socioemocional: Evidencias de su asociación en estudiantes chilenos. Aprobado para su publicación en Universitas Psychologica.

=== Selected edited books and book chapters ===
- Milicic, N. y Sius, M. (1995) Children with learning disabilities in Chile: Strategies to Facilitate Integration in Special Education in Latin America: experiences and issues. Ed. Alfredo J. Artiles, and Daniel P. Hallahan. Westport, Connecticut, London: Praeger.
- Milicic, N., Bravo, L. (2001). Learning Disabilities Studies In South American. Book chapter in Hallahan D. y Keogh B. (Eds) Research And Global Perspectives In Learning Disabilities. Lawrence Erlbaum. London, Cap. 18, pp. 311–328.
- ¿Quién dijo que era fácil ser padres?, with de Lérida, S. Santiago, Planeta, (2006); 286 pgs.
- Se me olvidó, con López de Lérida, S.; Zig-Zag, Santiago, (2013), 38 pgs.
- Milicic, N., Alcalay, L, Berger, C y Torretti, A (2014). Aprendizaje Socioemocional. Programa BASE (Bienestar y Aprendizaje Socioemocional) como estrategia de desarrollo en el contexto escolar. Mexico. Editorial Paidos. Instructor's edition 182 pgs. Student edition 56 pgs.
