= Church of Sts. Cyril and Methodius, Ljubljana =

Serbian Orthodox church in Ljubljana, Slovenia

Coordinates: 46°3′14.22″N 14°29′57.61″E

Church of Sts. Cyril and Methodius
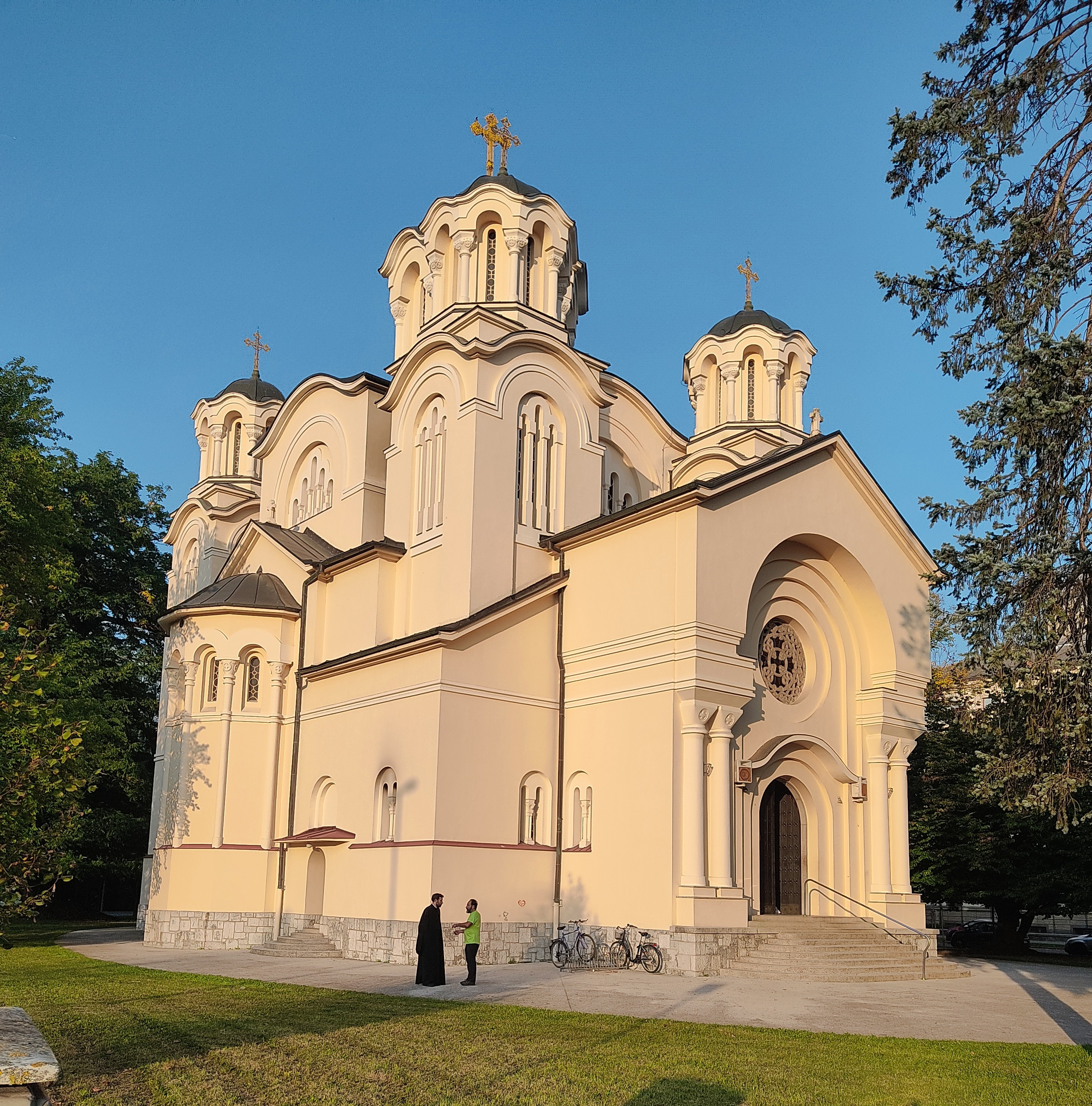
- Church of Sts. Cyril and Methodius, pictured in 2018
- Church of Sts. Cyril and Methodius
- Location: Ljubljana
- Country: Slovenia
- Denomination: Serbian Orthodox Church

History
- Status: Church
- Dedication: Cyril and Methodius

Architecture
- Functional status: Active
- Architect: Momir Korunović
- Style: Serbo-Byzantine

Administration
- Archdiocese: Metropolitanate of Zagreb and Ljubljana

Church of Sts. Cyril and Methodius (Serbian: Црква светих Ћирила и Методија; Slovene: Cerkev svetih Cirila in Metoda), commonly known as the Orthodox Church, is an Eastern Orthodox church located in Ljubljana, Slovenia. It is under jurisdiction of the Metropolitanate of Zagreb and Ljubljana of the Serbian Orthodox Church.

== History ==
Construction of the church began in 1932 in the presence of Serbian Patriarch Varnava. At the blessing they installed the relics of Saint Athanasius, which were brought from the Vatican by Tomáš Špidlík and symbolised the integration of one Christian unity (Orthodox and Catholic). In 2009, the church was visited by Serbian President Boris Tadić. Since 10 April 2010, the church has the status of a cultural monument of local significance.by Ivan Bricelj based on plans by the architect Momir Korunović. However, construction was interrupted by World War II and later by the communist period. Construction restarted in the late 1980s and was consecrated in 2005 in the presence of Serbian Patriarch Pavle, President of Slovenia Janez Drnovšek, and Ljubljana's Roman Catholic Archbishop Alojz Uran.

== Architrecture ==
Built in Serbo-Byzantine Revival, the church has five domes with golden crosses at their top. The frescoes in the interior were painted by the Serbian painters Dragomir Jašović, Miša Mladenović, and Danica Mladenovič from 1986 until 1997. The iconostasis is work of a prominent woodcarver workshop from Debar (North Macedonia) and has been decorated with icons by the Slovene painter Mirko Šubic, who created them in 1940.

== Gallery ==
Front view

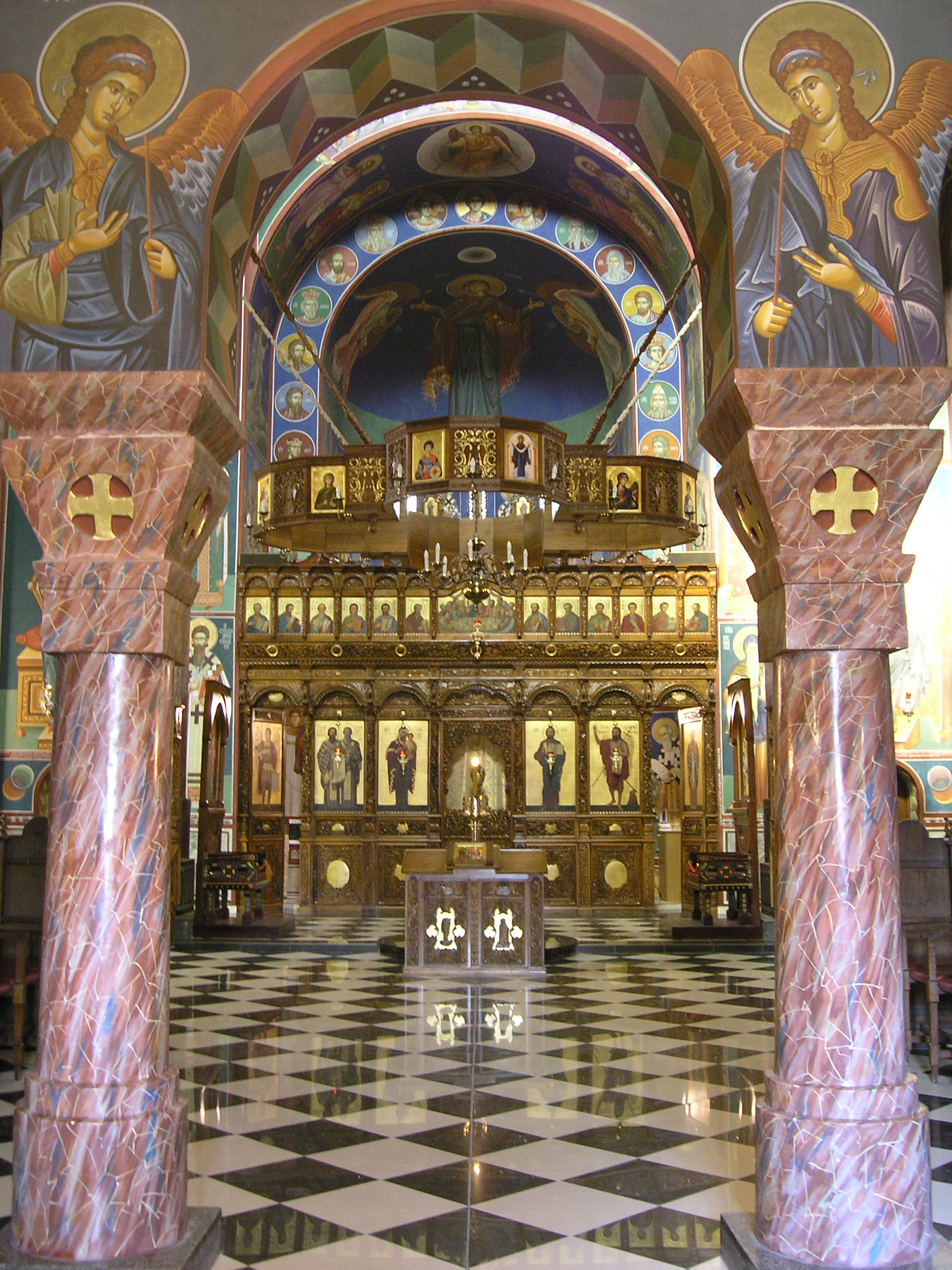
Interior view

== See also ==
- Serbs in Slovenia
