= Milíč of Kroměříž =

Czech Catholic priest and preacher

Milíč of Kroměříž (Czech pronunciation: [ˈmɪliːtʃ]; Latin: Milicius de Chremsir; Czech: Milíč z Kroměříže; German: Militsch von Kremsier; died 29 June 1374) was a Czech Catholic priest and the most influential preacher of the emerging Bohemian Reformation in the 14th century. Together with other Bohemian preachers and writers of that time, he paved in a certain sense the way for the reforming activity of Jan Hus. He is sometimes known as Jan Milíč of Kroměříž in modern literature, but in historical sources he's only referred to as Milíč of Kroměříž.

== Life ==
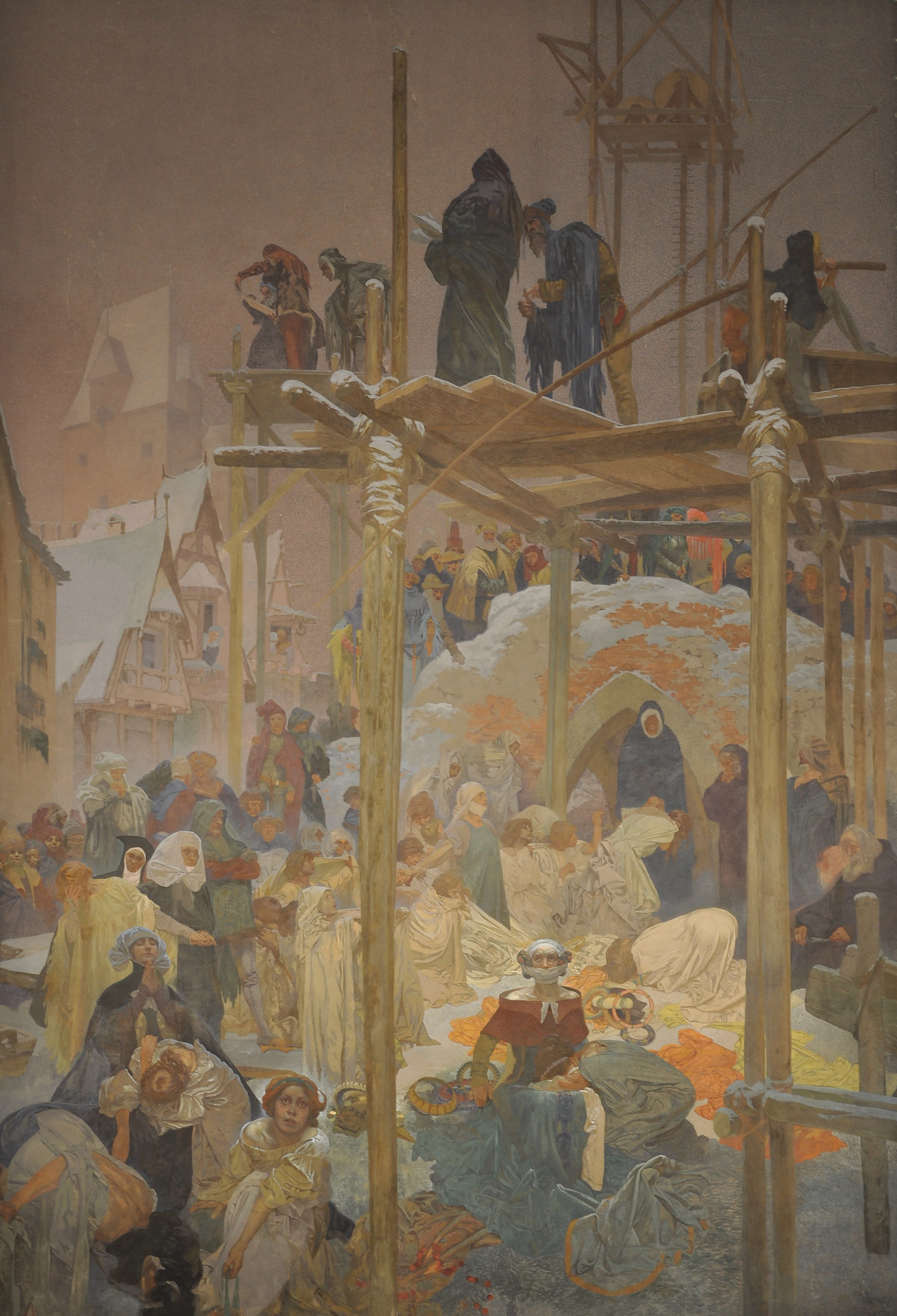
Jan Milíč of Kroměříž: A Brothel Converted to a Convent. (1916) A canvas from Alfons Mucha's monumental cycle The Slav Epic depicts a situation when former prostitutes from Prague quarter "Venice" are moved by Milíč's sermons to begin new life as nuns while on the place of former brothel is being built a cloister called "New Jerusalem"

Not much is known of Milíč's early life. He was born in Kroměříž, Moravia (part of the Bohemian Crown). The date of his birth is not known. He was in holy orders in 1350. From 1358 to 1360 he served as registrar and from 1360 to 1362 as corrector at the Imperial Chancery of Charles IV, whom he accompanied into Germany several times. In October 1362 received a canonry in the cathedral of Prague along with the dignity of archdeacon. In December 1363 he resigned all his appointments that he might become a preacher pure and simple; he addressed scholars in Latin, and (an innovation) the laity in their native Czech, or in German, which he learnt for the purpose.

He was conspicuous for his apostolic poverty and soon roused the enmity of the mendicant friars. The success of his labors made itself apparent in the way in which he transformed the ill-famed Benátky ("Venice") street in Prague Old Town quarter into a benevolent institution, Nový Jeruzalém ("New Jerusalem"). As he viewed the evils inside and outside the church in the light of Scripture, the conviction grew in his mind that the "abomination of desolation" was now seen in the temple of God, and that antichrist had come, and in 1367 he went to Rome (where Pope Urban V was expected from Avignon) to expound these views. He affixed to the gate of St. Peter's a placard announcing his sermon, but before he could deliver it was thrown into prison by the Inquisition.

Urban, however, on his arrival, ordered his release, whereupon he returned to Prague, and from 1369 to 1372 preached daily in the Týn Church there. In the latter year the clergy of the local archdiocese complained of him in 12 articles to the papal court at Avignon, whither he was summoned in Lent 1374, and where he died in the same year, not long after being declared innocent and authorized to preach before the assembly of cardinals.

== Works ==
=== Latin ===
- Libellus de Antichristo ("The (Small) Book About Antichrist"); written in prison at Rome
- Gratiæ Dei ("By Grace of God")
- Abortivus
- Lectiones quadragesimales ("The Lent Sermons")

=== Czech ===
- Modlitby po kázání ("The Prayers After Sermons")
