= Milići (Banovići) =

Milići Милићи
- Village
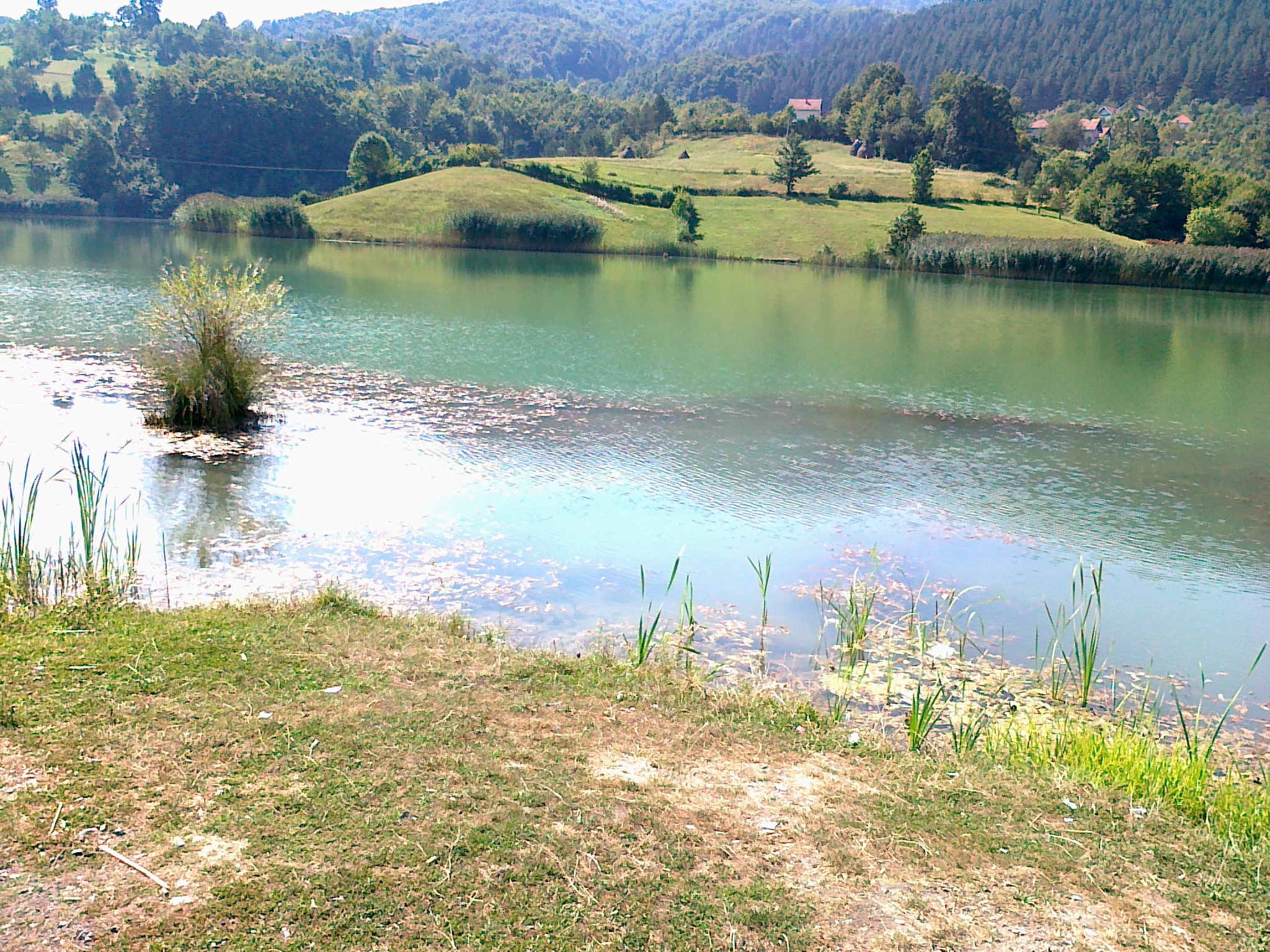

- Location within Bosnia and Herzegovina
- Coordinates: 44°25′11″N 18°25′16″E
- Country: Bosnia and Herzegovina
- Entity: Federation of Bosnia and Herzegovina
- Canton: Tuzla
- Municipality: Banovići

Area
  - Total: 1.42 sq mi (3.68 km^{2})

Population (2013)
  - Total: 185
  - Density: 130/sq mi (50.3/km^{2})
- Time zone: UTC+1 (CET)
  - Summer (DST): UTC+2 (CEST)

Milići (Cyrillic: Милићи) is a village in the municipality of Banovići, Bosnia and Herzegovina.

== Demographics ==
According to the 2013 census, its population was 185.

Ethnicity in 2013
| Ethnicity | Number | Percentage |
|---|---|---|
| Bosniaks | 174 | 94.1% |
| other/undeclared | 11 | 5.9% |
| Total | 185 | 100% |
