= Marindol =

- Interactive map of Marindol
- Location in Slovenia
- Coordinates: 45°30′17.58″N 15°19′53.58″E
- Country: Slovenia
- Traditional region: White Carniola
- Statistical region: Southeast Slovenia
- Municipality: Črnomelj

Area
  - Total: 6.23 km^{2} (2.41 sq mi)
- Elevation: 238.3 m (782 ft)

Population (2020)
  - Total: 93
  - Density: 15/km^{2} (39/sq mi)
- Postal code: 8341
- Climate: Cfb

Marindol (pronounced [ˈmaːɾindɔl]) is a settlement on the terrace above the left bank of the Kolpa River in the Municipality of Črnomelj in the White Carniola area of southeastern Slovenia. The area is part of the traditional region of Lower Carniola and is now included in the Southeast Slovenia Statistical Region.

== Name ==
Marindol was first attested in written sources in 1477 as Marintall (and in 1490 as Marental). The name is a compound formed from *Mari(ji)n dol (literally, 'Mary's valley'). The settlement was also once known as Šobatovci or Šobatovo selo, or Šabotovo/Šobotovo selo, cited as Shebatova sella in 1674.
