= Miliči =

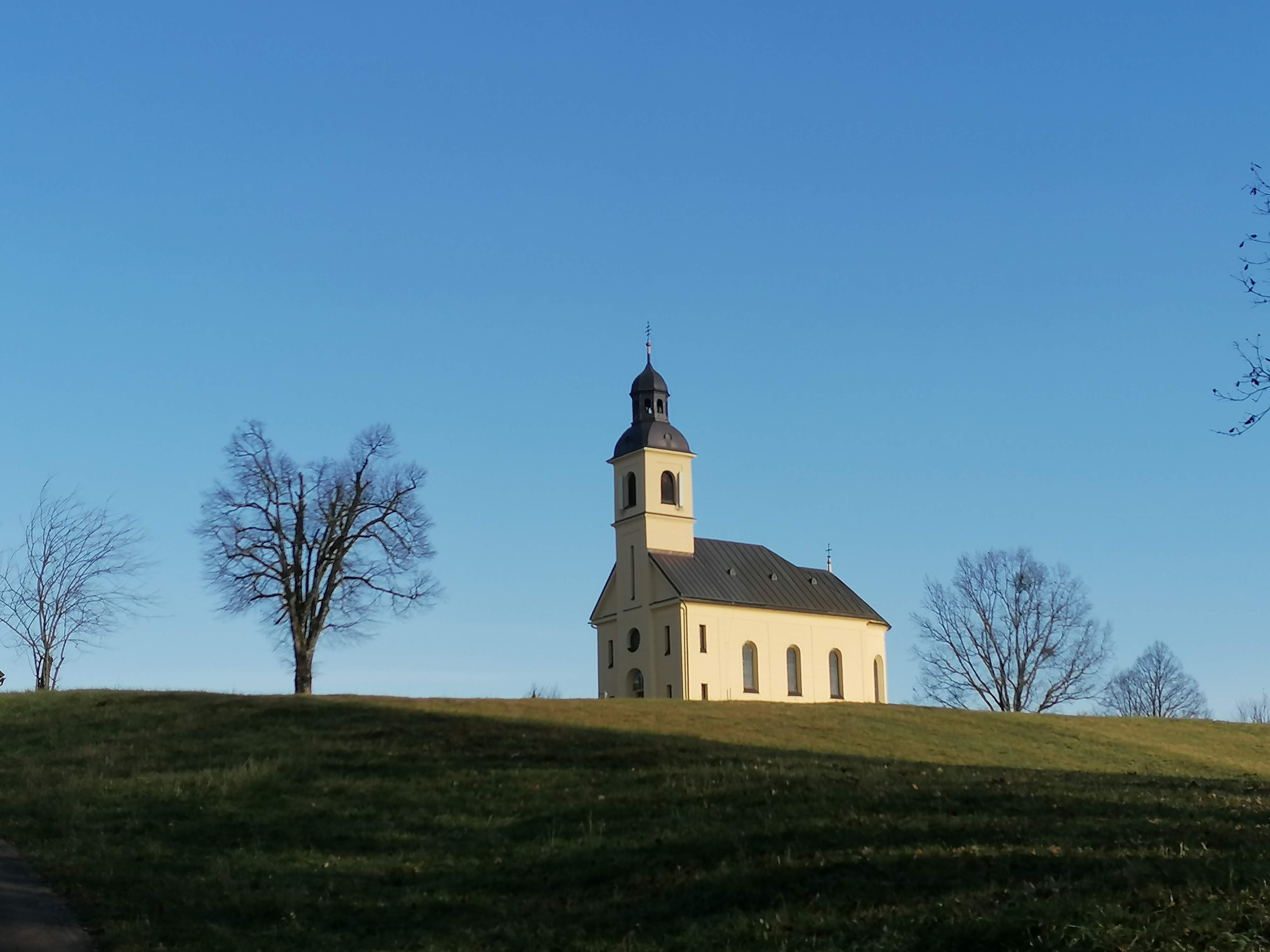
- Saints Peter and Paul Church
- Interactive map of Miliči
- Location in Slovenia
- Coordinates: 45°29′26.08″N 15°21′36.91″E
- Country: Slovenia
- Traditional region: White Carniola
- Statistical region: Southeast Slovenia
- Municipality: Črnomelj

Area
  - Total: 3.18 km^{2} (1.23 sq mi)
- Elevation: 233.5 m (766 ft)

Population (2020)
  - Total: 22
  - Density: 6.9/km^{2} (18/sq mi)
- Postal code: 8341

Miliči (pronounced [ˈmiːlitʃi]) is a settlement on the left bank of the Kolpa River in the Municipality of Črnomelj in the White Carniola area of southeastern Slovenia. The area is part of the traditional region of Lower Carniola and is now included in the Southeast Slovenia Statistical Region.

The village was established in the 16th century by Serbs that had joined the Uskok bands when fleeing Ottoman persecution (see Serbs of White Carniola). Descendants of these settlers still live in the village. The local church is thus a Serbian Orthodox Church dedicated to the Feast of Saints Peter and Paul. It was built in the 19th century.
