= Slavic names =

Slavic names by country

Given names originating from the Slavic languages are most common in Slavic countries.

Types of native Slavic names include:

- Two-base names, e.g., ending in mir/měr (Ostromir/měr, Tihomir/měr, Němir/měr), *voldъ (Vsevolod, Rogvolod), *pъlkъ (Svetopolk, Yaropolk), * slavъ (Vladislav, Dobroslav, Vseslav) and their derivatives (Dobrynya, Tishila, Ratisha, Putyata, etc.)
- Names from flora and fauna (Shchuka - pike, Yersh - ruffe, Zayac - hare, Wolk/Vuk - wolf, Orel - eagle)
- Names in order of birth (Pervusha - born first, Vtorusha/Vtorak - born second, Tretiusha/Tretyak - born third)
- Names according to human qualities (Hrabr - brave, Milana/Milena - beautiful, Milosh - beloved, Nadezhda - hope)

== History ==
In pre-Christian traditions, a child less than 7–10 years old would bear a "substitutional name", the purpose of which was to deflect attention from the child and thereby to protect it from the curiosity of evil powers. The practice was largely the result of the high mortality rate of young children at the time. A child who survived to 7–10 years was considered worthy of care and was granted adult status and a new adult name during a ritual first haircut.

Traditional names remained dominant until the Slavic nations converted to Christianity. Since then, however, baptismal names came into use, which were given after the patron saint of the newly baptized. Even after that, the traditional names persisted in everyday use, while in religious matters baptismal name was involved; thus, many persons had and used two names simultaneously. This is exemplified by how the Slavic saints of that time are referred to up to nowadays: e.g. St. Boris and Gleb, in holy baptism Roman and David. As the Slavic saints became more numerous, more traditional names entered the Church calendar; but more prominent was the overall decline in the number of people bearing traditional names. Finally, in 16th–17th century the traditional Slavic names which did not enter the calendar of either Orthodox or Catholic Church generally fell out of use. For Catholic Slavs, the decisive event was the Council of Trent (1545–63) decreed that every Catholic should have a Christian name instead of a native one.

=== Names in Poland ===
After the ban on native non-Christian names imposed by the Council of Trent, the Polish nobility (especially Protestants) attempted to preserve traditional names, such as Zbigniew and Jarosław. Ordinary people, however, tended to choose names solely from the Christian calendar, which contained only a handful of Slavic saints' names, in particular: Kazimierz (St. Casimir), Stanisław (St. Stanislaus), Wacław (St. Wenceslaus) and Władysław (St. Ladislaus). Slavic names that referred to God (e.g., Bogdan, Bogumił) were also permitted.

=== Names in Kievan Rus' ===
East Slavic names were based on common Slavic names such as Volodiměrŭ (Володимѣръ - "great ruler"), Svętopŭlkŭ (Свѧтопълкъ - "holy regiment"), Jęropŭlkŭ (Ѩропълкъ - "furious regiment"), Voislavŭ (Воиславъ - "glorious warrior"), Borislavŭ (Бориславъ - "glorious fighter"), Borisŭ (Борисъ - "fighter"), Liubomirŭ (Любомиръ - "loves the peace"), Ratiborŭ (Ратиборъ "war fighter"), Vadimŭ ("Вадимъ") or Badan (belonging to the wind spirit "Badan"), Jęroslavŭ (Ѩрославъ), Izęslavŭ (Изѧславъ "The one who took the glory"), Mstislavŭ (Мстиславъ "glorious revenge"), Vĭsevolodŭ (Вьсеволодъ "lord of everything"). In the 11th century, after the growing influence of the Christian Church, the tendency to use the names of saints of the Greek Church has increased and most pagan names were displaced by Christian names.

=== Names today ===
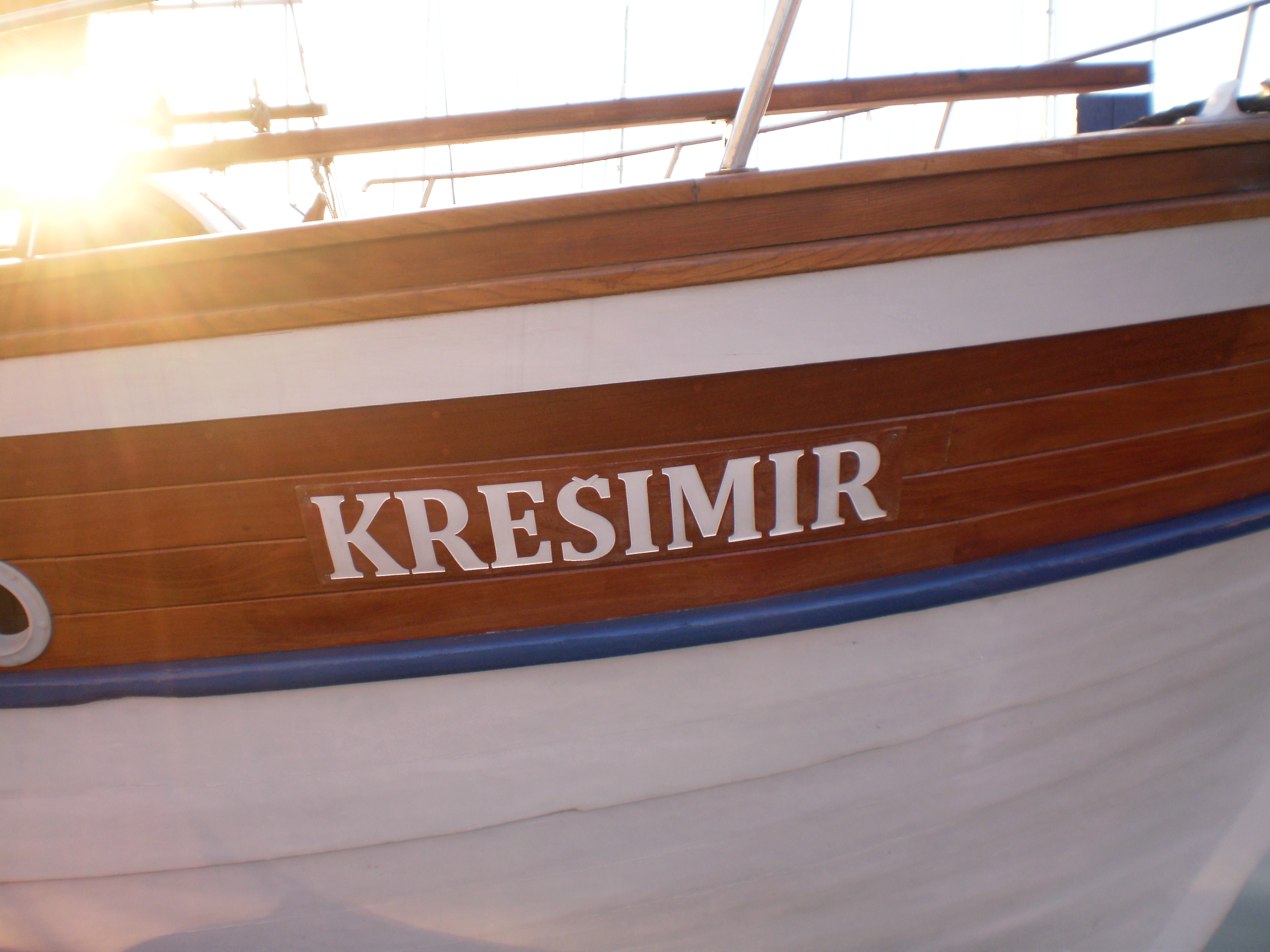
Krešimir, a name of Slavic origin, on a boat

Since national revivals during 19th and 20th centuries, traditional names, especially of historical rulers and heroes, regained popularity. For example, in Poland many forgotten names were resurrected, such as Bronisław, Bolesław, Dobiesław, Dobrosław, Jarosław, Mirosław, Przemysław, Radosław, Sławomir, Wiesław, Zdzisław, and Zbigniew; and new ones created, such as Lechosław and Wieńczysław. Today, traditional Slavic names are accepted by the Christian Church and are given at a child's baptism.

== Meanings ==
Old Slavic names were built with one or two lexemes:

=== Single-lexeme names ===
Single-lexeme names were derived from ordinary or adjectival words and were usually, though not always, borne by peasants, e.g.: Baran (ram), Szydło (awl), Kąkol (cockle), Broda (beard, chin), Żyła (vein), Uchacz (ear-man), Łopata (shovel), Żaba (frog), Rus (Ruthenian/Russian man), Cich (silent man), etc. Many names of this kind are used today, for example:

Feminine

- Duša (soul)
- Jagoda (berry, strawberry)
- Jasna (clear, bright)
- Lada (cadent;or: girl, maid)
- Ljuba, Luba, Lyubov (love)
- Mila (grace, favor)
- Mira (peace)
- Nada, Nadia, Nadezhda (hope)
- Slava (fame, glory)
- Snežana, Snježana (snow woman)
- Svetlana (bright, light or holy, strong)
- Vera (faith)
- Vesna (spring)
- Zlata (golden)
- Zora (dawn)

Masculine

- Bratan, Bratko (brother)
- Darko (gift)
- Dušan, Duško (soul)
- Goran (highlander)
- Lech
- Leszek
- Lubo, Ljuba (love)
- Miloš (kind)
- Miro, Mirko (peace)
- Mladen (young)
- Ognjen (fire)
- Plamen (flame)
- Prodan (sold)
- Slava (fame, glory)
- Slavo
- Tvrtko (hard)
- Veselin (happy)
- Vlad (ruler)
- Vuk (wolf)
- Yasen (clear, bright)
- Zdravko (health)
- Živan, Živko (lively)

=== Dithematic names ===
Dithematic names are built with two lexemes. Kaleta 1995 notes that "In the case of Old Germanic and Old Slavic personal names, the dithematic name form contained a wish for the new-born child. These wishes pertained to the values that obtained in these early times". In Poland alone, over 600 masculine names, 120 feminine names and 150 different affixes (lexemes) are known. These have been reconstructed from place names and the (scarce) written sources such as the Bull of Gniezno. Certain names were reserved for monarchs (e.g. in Poland: Kazimierz, Władysław, Bolesław). Examples are listed below. As an example of the pattern: Władysław contains the prefix wład (to rule, ruler) and the suffix sław (fame, glory). Note that feminine equivalents usually end in a (e.g. Bogusław - Bogusława).

Prefix or suffix	Meaning	Examples
blag, błog, blah, blaž	gentle, kind, blessed	Blahoslav, Blažena
bog, bóg, boh, boż	God, rich, fate	Bohumil, Boguslav, Bohdan, Bożena, Bogusław, Bogdan, Bogna, Božidar, Božidarka, Bożydar, Modliboga, Falibog, Boguwola, Božetjeh, Bogosav, Bogoljub, Bogomil
bole	great, more, large	Bolesław, Boleslav, Bolemir, Boleczest, Bolelut
bor	war, fight	Boris, Borzysław, Borislav, Dalibor, Sambor, Lutobor, Myślibora, Strogobor, Borisav, Borislav;
brat, bata	brother	Bratislav, Bratumił, Bratoljub
bron, bran	to protect, to defend	Bronisław, Branislav, Bronimir, Bronisąd, Srbobran, Częstobrona,
bude, budzi	to be	Budimír, Budimir, Budislav
'Ča, 'Če', 'ce', 'Cha'/'Chay'.	to await	Časlav, Czesław, Nechay, Nečajko, Čajek
choti, chocie	to want	Chociemir, Chciebor, Chociebąd, Chotimíra
chwał, fal, hval	to praise, to glorify	Boguchwał, Chwalibog, Chwalimir, Falibor, Hvalimir,
tech, ciech, tješ, teš	happy, comfort, consolle	Ciechosław, Wojciech, Sieciech, Techomir, Dobrociech, Božetech, Tješimir, Sławociech, Tešimir, Těšimir
dobo, dobie,	appropriate, brave	Dobiesław, Dobiegniew
cze, cti, ča, če	honour	Czesław, Ctibor, Czedrog, Čestmír, Česlav, Ctirad, Čedomir, Častimir
dar, dan	gift, receive	Dan, Božidar, Božidarka
dobro	good, goodness	Dobrosław, Dobromir, Dobroniega, Dobrogost, Dobromil, Dobrożyźń, Dobroslav
dom	house	Domarad, Domosław, Domagoj, Domamir, Domoľub, Domawit, Domabor
drag, drog, drah, drag	precious, beloved	Dragoslav, Dragomir, Dragoljub, Drogodziej, Drogoradz, Wieledrog, Predrag, Drohobysz, Miłodrog, Miodrag,
dzierż, drži	to have, to rule, to keep	Dzierżysław, Dzierżykraj, Dzirżyterg, Držislav
gniew, hněv	angry, furious	Zbigniew, Gniewomir, Mścigniew, Wojgniew, Dobiegniew, Ostrogniew, Zbyhněv
god	appropriate	Godemir, Godzimir, Godzisława
gost, host	guest	Miłogost, Radogost, Uniegost, Hostirad, Hostimil, Hostisvit, Lubgost, Gościsław
gwiazd, hvezd, zvezd	star	Hviezdoslav, Hviezdomir, Zvezdan, Zvezdana
jar, yar	strong, severe, fierce	Jarmila, Jaromar, Jaromír, Jarogniew, Jarosław, Yaropolk/Jaropełk , Yaroslav
kaz	to tell, to show	Kazimierz, Casimir, Kazimir, Skaziczest
krasi, kreši, krzesi	beauty	Krzesimir, Krešimir, Krzesisław, Kresivoje, Krasimira
kvet	flower	Kvetoslava
lud, ljud	people	Ľudmila, Ľudovít, Ljudevit, Ljudemisl
lut	severe, ruthless	Lutosław, Lutobor, Lutogniew, Lutomir, Zbylut, Lutomysł
lyub, lub, l'ub	love	Lubomir, Ljubomir, Lubosław, Lubov, Lubor, Ľubica, Ľubor,
mil, mił	love, to like, favour, graced	Vlastimil, Tomiła, Milica, Miłowit, Milomir, Miloslav, Milivoje, Ludmila, Radmila, Jarmila,
mir, měr, mierz, myr	peace, world, prestige	Chociemir, Mirogod, Miroslav, Damir, Casimir, Kazimierz, Ostromir, Mezamir, Radomír, Jaromír, Jezdimir, Kanimir, Bratomira, Mojmir, Uniemir, Vitomir, Vladimir, Krešimir, Krasimir, Godzimir, Rastimir, Ratimir, Želimir, Branimir, Zvonimir, Jaczemir
msti, mści	vengeance	Mstislav, Mścisław, Mściwoj, Mstivoj, Mszczuj
mysl, mysł	think	Přemysl, Myslivoj, Mislav
nieg	delight	Dobroniega, Njegomir, Mironieg, Niegodoma, Niegosław
ne, nie	negative	Nevzor, Nekras, Nezhdan, Niedamir, Nenad, Nebojša, Niedalic, Niesuł, Nemanja
ostro	sharp	Ostromir, Ostrogniew, Ostrík
pluk, polk	regiment, crowd	Yaropolk, Jaropluk, Sviatopolk, Svätopluk, Świętopełk
rast, rost, rósc,	grow, demand, usurp	Rastislav, Rościsław, Rościgniew, Rostimira
rad	counsel	Radovan, Radomír, Radoslav
rati, raci	war, fight, to do (vocal change from radi to rati)	Ratibor, Racisława, Racimir, Ratimir, Racigniew, Gnierat
siem, ziem, zem,	family, land	Siemowit, Siemomysł, Siemił, Ziemowit, Siemysław
sobie, sobě	usurp, for me	Soběslav, Sobierad, Sobiemir, Sobiebor
slav, sław	glory, fame	Mstislav, Stanisław, Rostislav, Sławomir, Vladislav, Izyaslav, Vyacheslav, Sviatoslav, Miroslav, Boguslav, Borislav, Sławobor, Gościsław. Jaroslav, Slavena, Wiesław, Kvetoslav, Tomislav, Věroslav, Soběslav, Slavoljub, Srboslav, Rastislav
spyci, spyti	pointless, unnecessary	Spytihněv
stan	to become	Stanimir, Stanislav, Stanisław, Stanibor, Stanimir, Staniša
sud, sąd, sand	to judge	Sudomir, Sudislav, Sędzimir, Sędziwoj, Bogusąd, Sędowin, Krzywosąd
suli	to promise, better	Sulisław, Sulibor, Sulimir, Sulirad, Sulich, Radsuł
svet, sviat, święt, svat	light, strong	Sviatoslav, Svetoslav, Svetlana, Światopełk, Swiãtopôłk, Świętomir, Svätobor, Svetozar, Svatoboj, Svetomir, Świętożyźń,
svo, sve, świe, sav	all, every, always	Świedrag, Svorad, Świegniew, Dragosav, Milosav
unie	better	Uniedrog, Uniebog, Uniesław
veli, vyache, więce, više	great, more, large	Vaclav, Vyacheslav, Wenzel, Vjenceslav, Veleslava, Wielimir, Velimir, Więcerad, Višeslav
vest, wieść	to know, to lead	Blagovest, Dobrowieść
vit, wit	to rule, to lead	Sviatovit, Vitomir, Dobrovit, Witosław, Uniewit, Gościwit,
vlad, wład, volod, włod, lad	to rule, ruler	Vladimir, Władysław, Volodymyr, Włodzimierz, Vladislav, Laszlo, Ladislav, Vsevolod, Vladena, Vladan, Władmiła, Vladivoj
vlast, włość	homeland	Vlastimil, Włościwoj, Vlastimir, Vlastislav
vrat	bring back	Vratislav
voj, woj	fighter, warrior, war	Wojsław, Częstowoj, Vojislav, Wojciech, Borivoj, Vladivoj, Vojnomir, Radivoj, Wojbor, Milivoj, Dobrivoje, Kresivoje, Ljubivoje
wol, vol	to prefer	Wolebor, Wolimir, Wolisław
vse, vše, wsze	all	Vseslav
zby	to dispel, to get rid of	Zbigniew, Zbylut
yar	See "jar"	
zde, zdzie, sede, Sdě	to do, make	Zdzisław, Zdziwoj, Sedemir, Zdeslav, Zderad, Zdziemił, Sděmir, Sdivoj
želi, żeli	want, desire	Żelibrat, Żelimysł, Żelisław, Želimíra, Želibor, Želimir, Želimirka, Želmír
zlat, złot, zlato	gold	Zlatomíra, Zlatimir, Zlatibor, Zlatan, Zlatko

=== Participle-built names ===
These are derived either from the past participle (in the passive voice), e.g.: Bojan, Chocian, Kochan, Miłowan, Pomian, Stator, Wygnan, or the present participle (in the active voice), e.g.: Cieszym, Myślim, Radzim, Borzym. Such names are repositories of perhaps the largest source of sociological data about the ancient Slavic people. They have a variety of purposes, which can be listed as follows:

- names containing a good wish, e.g. Kochan ('let him be loved'), Milan.
- names referring to affection for the new born child, e.g. Obiecan ('promised'), Żdan ('promised', 'expected'),
- names protecting from evil (consisting of lexemes with a negative, deterring effect) e.g. Wygnan, Mazan, Grozim, Niemir.

Other examples: Poznan ('known', 'recognized'), Goszczon (being a guest at someone's place), Krszczon ('baptized'), Radovan, Dragan, Željan, Dejan, Nayden, Mirjana.

=== Diminutive and hypocoristic names ===
Diminutive and hypocoristic (endearing) names deriving from the above-mentioned dithematic names are created by using different diminutive suffixes. Such names are very popular in everyday usage, and usually are created by replacing part of the name with the suffix -ek (masculine, predominantly West Slavic; e.g. Polish Włodzimierz – Włodek), -ko (masculine, predominantly South Slavic and Ukrainian), -ka (feminine; also masculine in Russian), or -a: Mila, Luba, Staszek, Radek, Władek, Zlatko, Zlata, Volodya, Bronek, Leszek, Dobrusia, Slavko, Wojtek, Mirka, Bogusia, Slava, Zdravko, Zbyszko, Miłosz, Staś, Przemek, Bolko, Draho, Željko, Borya (fight), Boško, Božica, Božana, Branko, Branka, Braniša, Borko, Budimka, Hvališa, Dobar, Dobra, Dragoš, Dragica, Dragi, Draga, Dragoş, Miloš, Slavko, Slavica, Slavisa, Svetlana, Wít, Zdenka, Bratko, Braco, Braca, Bato, Bata, Batica, etc.

== Christian saints with Slavic names ==
The following list contains only canonized Saints. Beatified Saints with Slavic names (e.g. Saint Ceslaus, Saint Radim) are not included.

- Boris I of Bulgaria
- Borislav
- Casimir
- Jaroslav (disambiguation)
- Vladimir of Duklja
- Ladislaus I of Hungary
- Ludmila of Bohemia
- Milutin of Serbia
- Nadezhda
- Stanislav
  - Stanislaus Kostka
  - Stanislaus of Szczepanów
  - Stanisław Kazimierczyk
- Svorad
- Uroš of Dečani
- Vladimir I of Kiev
- Vladislav
  - Vladislav of Serbia
- Wenceslaus I, Duke of Bohemia
- Wojciech (Polish) / Vojtěch (Czech), canonized as Adalbert of Prague
- Zdislava Berka

== See also ==
- East Slavic name
- Slavic name suffixes
- Outline of Slavic history and culture
