= Niemir =

Given name of old Slavic origin

- Gender: masculine
- Name day: February 14

Origin
- Origin: Slavic

Other names
- Variant forms: Něměr, Niemierz, Nemyr
- Related names: female form Niemira

Niemir, Niemirz, or Niemierz is a male Slavic given name of Old Slavic origin, present in other Slavic nations (in different forms and spellings).

The name is composed of nie- (a negation) as well as -mir ("peace", "good", "great", "famous"), present in a number of other Slavic given names such as Mirogniew and Mirogod and related to Gothic naming element mērs, -mir, cf. Theodemir, Valamir.

Medieval texts from Mazovia often substitute this given name in the form of Niemierza as Erasmus, a male given name derived from Ancient Greek. The name day for Niemir is celebrated on February 14 in Poland.

A number of toponyms are derived from the name: Niemierzyn, Niemierze, Niemirowice, Niemirki, Niemirów — 4 settlements in Poland and 2 in Ukraine (Nemyriv), Niemirówka — 1 settlement in Poland, 2 in Ukraine (Nemyrivka), 1 in Moldova (Nimereuca).
