= Vekenega (given name) =

- Gender: female
- Language: Croatian

Origin
- Origin: Slavic
- Meaning: vek, "vijek" ("age") + niega ("delight")
- Region of origin: Dalmatia

Other names
- Related names: Dobroniega (f)

Vekenega is a Slavic name which contains word "vek", "vijek" - age and "niega" - delight.

== People ==
- Vekenega - Croatian 11th century nun from the House of Madi
- Vekenega Profaca - Croatian swimmer
- M. Vekenega Križanac - Croatian nun
