= Jasna (given name) =

Jasna is a South Slavic female given name, derived from South Slavic jasno meaning clear, sharp.

Nicknames are Jasnushka, Jasenka, Jasnenka, Jassie. Name days in Slovenia are: 11 or 17 August.

Notable people with the name include:

- Jasna Diklic (born 1946), Bosnian actress
- Jasna Djoković (born 1991), Montenegrin footballer
- Jasna Đorđević (born 1993), Serbian footballer
- Jasna Đuričić (born 1966), Serbian actress
- Jasna Fazlić (born 1970), American table tennis player
- Jasna Gabrič (born 1985), Slovene politician
- Jasna Kolar-Merdan (born 1956), Bosnian and Yugoslav handball player
- Jasna Majstorović (born 1984), Serbian volleyball player
- Jasna Matić (born 1964), Serbian business consultant and a politician
- Jasna Omejec (born 1962), Croatian jurist
- Jasna Popovic (born 1979), Serbian pianist
- Jasna Ptujec (born 1959), Yugoslav/Croatian handballer player
- Jasna Samic (born 1949), Bosnian and French writer, author of books (poetry, novels, short stories, essays, research work, theater plays)
- Jasna Šekarić (born 1965), Serbian sport shooter
- Jasna Tošković (born 1989), Montenegrin handballer player
- Jasna Veličković (born 1974), Serbian composer
- Jasna Zlokić (born 1955), Croatian singer and actress

== See also ==
- Slavic names
