= Vlasta (given name) =

Vlasta is a Czech, Slovak and Croatian feminine given name. It has its root in the Slavic word vlast (the modern meaning is 'homeland', but it once meant 'government' and 'property'), so it can be interpreted as "possessive" or "ruler", but also modernly as "loving one's homeland". Notable people with the name include:

- Vlasta Chramostová (1926–2019), Czech actress
- Vlasta Děkanová (1909–1974), Czech gymnast
- Vlasta Fabianová (1912–1991), Czech actress
- Vlasta Fialová (1928-1998), Czech actress
- Vlasta Fialová (archaeologist) (1896–1972), Czech archaeologist and historian
- Vlasta Foltová (1913–2001), Czech gymnast
- Vlasta Havelková (1857–1939), Czech ethnographer, archaeologist and folklorist
- Vlasta Kálalová (1896–1971), Czech medical doctor
- Vlasta Matulová (1918–1989), Czech actress
- Vlasta Parkanová (born 1951), Czech lawyer and politician
- Vlasta Pavić (born 1957), Croatian politician
- Vlasta Průchová (1926–2006), Czech jazz singer
- Vlasta Štěpová (born 1938), Czech economist and politician
- Vlasta Fialová (1928-1998), Czech actress

== Shortened form of masculine given names ==
Vlasta is also a shortened form of the masculine names Vlastimil, Vlastimir, Vlastislav, etc. Notable people who were known by this shortened form include:

- Vlasta Burian (1891–1962), Czech actor
- Vlasta Velisavljević (1926–2021), Serbian actor
- Vlasta Vrána (born 1950), Canadian actor

== See also ==
- Vlasta (disambiguation)
