= Velimir =

- Gender: male
- Name day: October 28

Origin
- Origin: Slavic
- Meaning: vele ("great, more") + mir ("peace, prestige")

Other names
- Variant form: Wielimir

Velimir (Serbian Cyrillic: Велимир) is a Serbo-Croatian masculine given name and sometimes a surname, a Slavic name derived from elements vele "great" and mir "peace, prestige". It may refer to:

- Velimir Ilić (born 1951), politician
- Velimir Ivanović, (born 1978), Serbian footballer
- Velimir Jovanović, (born 1987), Serbian footballer
- Velimir Khlebnikov (1885–1922), Russian poet and playwright
- Velimir Milošević (1937–2004), Montenegrin writer, poet, and editor
- Velimir Naumović (1936–2011), Serbian footballer
- Velimir Perasović (born 1965), Croatian basketball player
- Velimir Radinović, (born 1981), Canadian-Serbian basketball player
- Velimir Radman, (born 1983), Croatian footballer
- Velimir Sombolac, (1939–2016), Serbian-Yugoslav footballer
- Velimir Stjepanović, (born 1993), Serbian swimmer
- Velimir Škorpik (1919–1943), Croatian-Yugoslav Partisan commander
- Velimir Valenta (1929–2004), Croatian-Yugoslav rower
- Velimir Vukićević (1871–1930), Serbian-Yugoslav politician
- Velimir Zajec (born 1956), Croatian footballer and manager
- Velimir Živojinović (disambiguation), several people

Other

- 3112 Velimir

== See also ==
- Wielimir, Polish equivalent
- Velimirović, surname
