= Bratko =

Bratko is a given name and surname. Notable people with the name include:

- Bratko Bibič (born 1957), Slovenian accordionist
- Ekaterina Bratko (born 1993), Russian footballer
- Ivan Bratko (disambiguation), multiple people
- Nicholas Bratko (1896–1958), Greek-Catholic priest

== See also ==
- Bratko Menaion
