= Vitomir =

- Gender: male

Origin
- Origin: Slavic
- Meaning: mir ("peace, world, prestige")

Other names
- Alternative spelling: Witomir
- Nicknames: Vito, Miro, Mirek, Vitek
- Related names: Mirovit, Mirowit

Vitomir (Polish: Witomir, Serbian: Витомир) is an old given name of Slavic origin.

In various Slavic languages, mir means "peace, world, prestige". The vit is also found in the name of the Slavic deity Svetovit.

Feminine forms include Vitomira and Witomira. Nicknames include Vito, Miro, Mirek, and Vitek.

Notable people with the name include:

- Zygmunt Witymir Bieńkowski, Polish pilot and writer
- Vito Dimitrijević, Yugoslavian footballer
- Vitomir Lukić, Bosnian-Croat prose writer and pedagogue
- Vitomir "Vito" Nikolić, Montenegrin poet and journalist
- Vitomir Vutov, Bulgarian football goalkeeper
- Vitomir Prodanov – Patriarch Vikentije, the fourth Partriach of the reunified Serbian Orthodox Church

== See also ==
- Slavic names
