= Dobiesław =

- Gender: male

Origin
- Origin: Slavic
- Meaning: dobie ("appropriate, brave") + sława ("glory, fame")

Other names
- Alternative spelling: Dobosław
- Variant form: Dobiesława (f)
- Nicknames: Dobko, Sławek, Sława

Dobiesław - is an old Polish given name of Slavic origin built of two parts: dobie - "appropriate, brave" and sława - "glory, fame". Feminine form is: Dobiesława. The name may refer to:

== People ==
- Dobiesław Kmita, a Polish nobleman, Lublin Voivode
- Dobiesław "Lubelczyk" Kurozwęcki, a Polish nobleman, the Palatine of Lublin

== Places ==
- Dobiesław, Gryfice County, a settlement in West Pomeranian Voivodeship in north-western Poland
- Dobiesław, Sławno County, a village in West Pomeranian Voivodeship in north-western Poland
- Dobiesławice, Kuyavian-Pomeranian Voivodeship, a village Kuyavian-Pomeranian Voivodeship in north-central Poland
- Dobiesław-Kolonia, a settlement in West Pomeranian Voivodeship, in north-western Poland

== See also ==
- Slavic names
