= Zdravko =

- Gender: male
- Language: South Slavic
- Name day: April 17 (Bulgaria)

Origin
- Origin: Slavic
- Meaning: zdrav ("healthy")

Zdravko (Cyrillic: Здравко) is a masculine given name of South Slavic origin derived from word "zdrav" meaning "healthy". Notable people with the name include:

- Zdravko Čolić, Bosnian singer
- Zdravko Ježić, Croatian water polo player
- Zdravko Kovačić, Croatian water polo player
- Zdravko Kuzmanović, Swiss-born Serbian footballer
- Zdravko Lazarov, Bulgarian footballer
- Zdravko Mladenović (born 1977), Serbian politician and teacher
- Zdravko Ponoš, Serbian politician and general
- Zdravko Radulović, Montenegrin-born Croatian basketball player
- Zdravko Rajkov, Serbian footballer and manager
- Zdravko Šotra, Bosnian Serb film director and screenwriter
- Zdravko Zdravkov, Bulgarian footballer

== See also ==
- Slavic names
- Zdravkov
- Zdravković
