= Niemirowski =

Niemirowski, feminine: Niemirowska is a Polish-language toponymic surname meaning "from Nemyriv (now in Ukraine)" or "from Niemirów (Poland)".

As a Polish noble surname, it, together its variant, Niemierowski, belonged to the Trzaska coat of arms heraldic clan.

The Russian-language variant is Nemirovsky / Nemirovskaya, the Ukrainian one is Nemyrivskyi / Nemyrivska.

The surname may refer to:

- David Nemirovsky (born 1976), Canadian ice hockey player
- Irène Némirovsky (1903–1942), novelist of Ukrainian Jewish origin, who lived in France
- Leopold Niemirowski (1810–1883), Polish painter
- Ludwik Bernstein-Niemirowski, Lewis B. Namier
- Mikhail Nemirovsky (born 1974), Canadian-German ice hockey player
- Mordechai Nemirovsky, later Mordechai Namir
- Pascal Nemirovski (born 1962), French piano player and teacher
- Yael Nemirovsky (born 1944), Israeli electrical engineer
