= Bądzsław =

- Pronunciation: [ˈbɔntswaf]
- Gender: male
- Language: Polish

Origin
- Origin: Old Polish
- Meaning: be famous

Bądzsław [ˈbɔntswaf] is a masculine Old Polish name that is constructed from two words: bądź (be) and sław (famous). This name is very rarely used.

In Poland Bądzsław has its name day on August 12.
