= Niemirski =

Niemirski (Feminine: Niemirska) is a Polish surname. Notable people with the surname include:

- Joanna Niemirska (born 1979), Polish film actress
- Józef Niemirski Józef Celmajster, Polish physician
- Małgorzata Niemirska (born 1947), Polish stage and film actress

== See also ==
- Niemirowski
