= Veselin =

Veselin (Cyrillic script: Веселин) is a masculine given name of Slavic origin. It may refer to:

- Veselin Beshevliev (1900–1992), Bulgarian historian and philologist
- Veselin Bliznakov (born 1944), Bulgarian politician
- Veselin Branimirov (born 1975), Bulgarian retired football defender
- Veselin Čajkanović (1881–1946), Serbian classical and religious history scholar, Greek and Latin translator
- Veselin Đoković (born 1976), Serbian/Montenegrin retired football player who is a manager
- Veselin Đuho (born 1960), former water polo player and current coach from Croatia, twice Olympic gold medalist
- Veselin Đuranović (1925–1997), communist politician from Montenegro
- Veselin Đurasović (born 1957), former Bosnian football player, from the late 1970s and the 1980s
- Veselin Ganev (born 1987), Bulgarian footballer
- Veselin Jelušić, Serbian football manager who has managed a number of national teams in Africa, including Angola and Botswana
- Veselin Marchev (born 1990), Bulgarian footballer
- Veselin Marinov, Bulgarian singer
- Veselin Masleša (1906–1943), Bosnian Serb writer, activist and Yugoslav Partisan
- Veselin Matić (born 1960), Serbian professional basketball coach
- Veselin Metodiev (born 1957), Bulgarian politician, member of Parliament & deputy chairman of Democrats for a Strong Bulgaria
- Veselin Minev (born 1980), Bulgarian footballer
- Veselin Misita (1904–1941), Serb military commander holding the rank of lieutenant colonel during World War II
- Veselin Penev (born 1982), Bulgarian footballer, currently playing for Beroe Stara Zagora as a left-sided defender
- Veselin Petrović (1929–1995), Serbian cyclist
- Veselin Petrović (basketball) (born 1977), Serbian professional basketball player
- Veselin Popović (born 1975), Serbian professional football player
- Veselin Savić (born 1989), Serbian rower
- Veselin Šljivančanin (born 1953), former Montenegrin officer in the Yugoslav People's Army
- Veselin Stoyanov (1902–1969), Bulgarian composer
- Veselin Stoykov (born 1986), Bulgarian footballer
- Veselin Topalov (born 1975), Bulgarian chess grandmaster
- Veselin Tsvetkovski (born 1989), Bulgarian footballer
- Veselin Tzinzov (born 1986), Bulgarian cross country skier who has competed since 2004
- Veselin Vachev (born 1973), former Bulgarian footballer
- Veselin Velikov (born 1977), Bulgarian former footballer, and now manager
- Veselin Vlahović, known as "Batko" or the "Monster of Grbavica" (born 1969), Montenegrin Serb war criminal
- Veselin Vujović (born 1961), former Yugoslav handball player
- Veselin Vukotić (criminal), Montenegrin criminal and hitman
- Veselin Vuković (born 1958), former Yugoslav handball player

== See also ==
- Veselinov
- Veselinović
- Veselinovac
