= Květoslav =

- Gender: male

Origin
- Origin: Slavic
- Meaning: květ ("flower") + sláva ("glory")

Other names
- Alternative spelling: Kwiatosław
- Variant form: Květoslava (f)
- Nicknames: Květa, Květo, Sláva, Slavko
- Related names: Svetoslav (Serbo-Croatian), Florian (Romance)

Květoslav (feminine: Květoslava) is a Slavic origin name derived from the words "květ" – flower, and "sláva" – glory. Diminutive form: Květa, Květo.

The name is known mostly in the Czech Republic and Slovakia, though its feminine forms (Kwietosława and Kwiatosława) as well as their diminutive (Kwieta) also rarely appear in Poland.

== People ==
- Květa Jeriová, Czech cross country-skier
- Květoslav Minařík, Czech yogi and mystic
- Květoslav Svoboda, Czech freestyle swimmer

== Places ==
- Kvetoslavov - a small village in western Slovakia
