= Świętopełk =

Świętopełk is a Polish male name of Slavic origin, meaning "one who has strong regiments". In various languages it is rendered as Suatopolc, Suatopolk, Swietopelk, Swantopolk, Swantepolk, Swantipolk, Swatopolk, Svante, Svatopluk, Zwentibold.

Świętopełk can refer to the following Polish historical characters:

- Świętopełk Mieszkowic (c. 980–10th-century), son of Mieszko I of Poland and Oda von Haldensleben
- Swietopelk I, Duke of Pomerania, Duke of Pomerelia (1109/1113–1121)
- Swietopelk II, Duke of Pomerania, Duke of Pomerelia (1190/1200–1266)

== See also ==
- Sviatopolk (disambiguation) Ukrainian, Russian, Bulgarian version
- Svatopluk, Czech version
- Svante, Swedish version
- Zwentibold, German version
