= Ctirad =

- Gender: male

Origin
- Origin: Slavic
- Meaning: čest / chest ("honour") + rad ("joy, care, advice")

Other names
- Variant form: Ctirada {f}
- Related names: Ctibor, Česlav

Ctirad (pronounced [ˈtscɪrat]) (Polish: Czcirad) is a Slavic-origin male given name derived from the elements čĭstĭ "honour" and radŭ "happy, willing".

== Name days ==
Czech: 16 January

== Nicknames ==
Ctishek, Ctisha, Radek, Ctirek, Rado, Ches

== Notable people ==
- In Czech mythology (as told in The Maidens' War), the nobleman Ctirad was killed by Šárka and the other rebel maidens
  - Ctirad and Šárka, sculpture
- Ctirad Benáček (1924–1999), Czech basketball player
- Ctirad Jungmann (born 1959), Czech rower
- Ctirad Kohoutek (1929–2011), Czech composer, music theorist, and pedagogue
- Ctirad Mašín, 1950s Czech resistance fighter
- Ctirad Ovčáčík (born 1984), Czech ice hockey player
- Ctirad Uher, Czech physicist at the University of Michigan in Ann Arbor
