= Bogna =

- Gender: feminine

Origin
- Origin: Old Polish
- Meaning: Bóg ("God")

Other names
- Related names: Bogdana, Bogusława

Bogna is a female given name of Polish origin. It may be a diminutive form of various names, including Bogdana, Bogusława, and Bogumiła. The name is derived from the word Bóg ("God") and may mean "divine" but also "luck, fate, rich".

People named Bogna include:

- Bogna Bartosz, Polish classical singer
- Bogna Burska (born 1974), Polish playwright and visual artist
- Bogna Janke (born 1973), Polish journalist and politician
- Bogna Jóźwiak (born 1983), Polish sabre fencer
- Bogna Koreng (born 1964), Sorbian journalist and television presenter
- Bogna Krasnodębska-Gardowska (1900–1986), Polish painter
- Bogna Sobiech (born 1990), Polish handball player
- Bogna Sworowska (born 1967), Polish model and television personality

== See also ==
- Slavic names
