= Name days in Poland =

Traditionally, name day celebrations (Polish: imieniny [imjɛˈɲinɘ]) have often enjoyed a celebratory emphasis greater than that of birthday celebrations in Poland. However, birthday celebrations are increasingly popular and important, particularly among the young as well as the older generation in the territories regained after the Second World War due to remaining Prussian Protestant influences.

Name day celebrations involve the gathering and socialising of friends and family at the celebrant's home, as well as the giving of gifts and flowers at home and elsewhere, such as at the workplace or kids in school get candy. This tradition doesn't include regions of Upper Silesia and Kashubia. Local calendars often contain the names celebrated on a given day. If a name is celebrated on more than one day, it is customary to choose the first day after the celebrant's birthday.

== January ==
1. Mieczysław, Mieczysława, Mieszko
2. Abel, Achacy, Achacjusz, Aspazja, Bazyli, Izydor, Jakobina, Jakubina, Makary, Narcyz, Ritka, Stefania, Strzeżysław, Sylwester, Sylwestra, Telesfor, Telesfora
3. Danuta, Piotr, Genowefa
4. Angelika, Aniela, Dobromir, Eugeniusz, Grzegorz, Izabela, Kalutek
5. Edward, Emilian, Hania, Szymon
6. Andrzej, Bolemir, Kacper, Kasper
7. Julian, Lucjan, Walenty
8. Mścisław, Seweryn
9. Antoni, Borzymir, Julian, Julianna
10. Dobrosław, Jan, Paweł
11. Feliks, Krzesimir, Matylda
12. Antoni, Arkadiusz, Benedykt, Czesław, Czesława, Ernest
13. Bogumił, Bogusława, Weronika
14. Feliks (k., m.), Piotr (k.), Nina, Szczęsny, Domosław, Radogost
15. Aleksander, Dąbrówka, Dobrawa, Domasław, Paweł
16. Marcel, Włodzimierz, Kevin
17. Antoni, Jan, Rościsław
18. Bogumił, Jaropełk, Krystyna, Małgorzata, Piotr
19. Andrzej, Bernard, Erwin, Henryk, Mariusz, Marta, Racimir, Sara
20. Dobiegniew, Fabian, Sebastian
21. Agnieszka, Jarosław, Jarosława, Marcela
22. Anastazy, Dobromysł, Dorian, Marta, Wincenty
23. Jan, Maria
24. Felicja, Mirogniew, Rafaela, Rafał, Tymoteusz
25. Miłosz, Miłowan, Miłowit, Paweł, Tatiana, Maleszka
26. Paula, Paulina, Wanda
27. Angelika, Ilona, Julian
28. Agnieszka, Augustyn, Julian, Karol, Piotr, Radomir
29. Hanna, Walerian, Zdzisław
30. Feliks, Gerard, Maciej, Marcin, Martyna, Sebastian
31. Euzebiusz, Jan, Piotr

== February ==
1. Dobrochna, Iga, Ignacy, Paweł, Siemirad, Żegota
2. Joanna, Korneliusz, Maria, Miłosława, Rory
3. Błażej, Ashish, Oskar, Stefan, Telimena
4. Andrzej, Gilbert, Jan, Joanna, Józef, Weronika, Witosława
5. Aga, Agata, Jakb, Jan, Paweł, Piotr
6. Antoni, Bogdan, Bohdan, Dorota, Ksenia, Szymon
7. Alfons, Parteniusz, Partenia, Romeusz, Romuald, Rozalia, Ryszard, Sulisław
8. Gniewomir, Jan, Paweł, Piotr, Sebastian
9. Bernard, Eryk, Eryka
10. Gabriel, Jacek, Elwira, Erica
11. Lucjan, Maria, Olgierd, Świętomira
12. Julian, Laurenty, Nora
13. Grzegorz, Jordan, Katarzyna, Toligniew, Linda
14. Dobiesława, Józef, Konrad, Krystyna, Lilian, Liliana, Mikołaj, Niemir, Niemira, Zenon, Cyryl
15. Georgina, Jordan, Jowita, Józef, Klaudiusz
16. Bernard, Dan, Danuta, Julianna
17. Donata, Franciszek, Julian, Konstanty, Łukasz, Niegomir, Zbigniew, Zbyszko
18. Albert, Alberta, Krystiana, Więcesława, Zuzanna
19. Arnold, Henryk, Konrad
20. Leon, Ludmiła, Ludomiła
21. Eleonora, Feliks, Teodor
22. Marta, Małgorzata, Piotr, Wiktor
23. Bądzimir, Damian, Piotr, Roma, Seweryn
24. Bogurad, Bogusz, Boguta, Maciej, Piotr
25. Bolebor, Cezary, Maciej, Małgorzata
26. Aleksander, Bogumił, Cezariusz, Mirosław, Ewelina, Aleksandra
27. Aleksander, Anastazja, Gabriel, Gabriela, Sierosława
28. Józef, Roman, Lech
29. Dobronieg, Roman

== March ==
1. Albin, Antoni, Antonina, Amelia, Feliks, Herakles, Joanna, Józef, Piotr, Leo
2. Franciszek, Helena, Henryk, Krzysztof, Michał, Paweł, Piotr, Radosław
3. Hieronim, Maryna
4. Adrian, Adriana, Arkadiusz, Eugeniusz, Kazimierz, Lucja
5. Adrian, Adriana, Fryderyk, Jan, Oliwia, Wacław, Wacława
6. Eugenia, Jordan, Klaudian, Róża, Wiktor, Wojsław
7. Felicja, Paweł, Tomasz
8. Beata, Jan, Julian, Miligost, Miłogost, Stefan
9. Dominik, Franciszka, Katarzyna
10. Aleksander, Karina, Borzysław, Cyprian
11. Benedykt, Drogosława, Edwin, Konstantyn, Rozyna
12. Bernard, Blizbor, Grzegorz, Józefina
13. Bożena, Ernest, Kasjan, Krystyna, Marek
14. Bożeciecha, Jakub, Leon, Matylda, Michał
15. Gościmir, Klemens, Krzysztof, Ludwika
16. Henryka, Herbert, Izabela
17. Gertruda, Jan, Patryk, Zbigniew, Zbyszko
18. Aleksander, Boguchwał, Cyryl, Edward
19. Bogdan, Józef
20. Aleksander, Aleksandra, Bogusław, Klaudia
21. Benedykt, Lubomira, Mikołaj
22. Bogusław, Katarzyna, Kazimierz, Paweł
23. Feliks, Katarzyna, Piotr
24. Gabriel, Marek, Szymon
25. Ireneusz, Łucja, Lucja, Lutomysł, Maria, Wieńczysław
26. Emanuel, Feliks, Manuela, Teodor
27. Benedykt, Ernest, Jan, Lidia, Rupert
28. Aniela, Antoni, Jan
29. Cyryl
30. Amelia, Aniela, Częstobor, Jan
31. Balbina, Beniamin, Dobromira, Kornelia

== April ==
1. Grażyna, Katarzyna, Teodora, Tolisław, Zbigniew, Zbyszko
2. Franciszek, Sądomir, Władysław, Władysława
3. Antoni, Cieszygor, Jakub, Ryszard
4. Benedykt, Izydor, Wacław, Wacława
5. Borzywoj, Irena, Wincenty, Jam
6. Ada, Adam, Ireneusz, Katarzyna, Świętobor
7. Donata, Przecław
8. Cezary, Radosław, Sieciesława
9. Dobrosława, Dymitr, Maja
10. Antoni, Daniel, Henryk, Małgorzata, Michał
11. Filip, Jaromir, Leon, Marek, Gijs
12. Andrzej, Iwan, Juliusz, Siemiodrog, Wiktor, Zenon
13. Jan, Justyn, Małgorzata, Marcin, Przemysł, Przemysław
14. Julianna, Justyn, Maria, Myślimir
15. Anastazja, Leonid, Wacław, Wacława
16. Erwin, Julia, Ksenia, Nikita, Nosisław
17. Jakub, Józef, Klara, Radociech, Robert, Rudolf, Stefan
18. Bogusław, Bogusława, Gościsław
19. Cieszyrad, Czechasz, Czesław, Leon, Tymon, Werner, Włodzimierz
20. Agnieszka, Czechoń, Czesław, Nawoj, Szymon, Teodor, Mario
21. Bartosz, Drogomił, Feliks, Konrad, Jeannette
22. Kajus, Kaja, Łukasz, Teodor
23. Gerard, Helena, Jerzy, Wojciech
24. Aleksander, Erwin, Grzegorz, Joanna
25. Jarosław, Marek
26. Maria, Marzena, Spycimir
27. Andrzej, Bożebor, Martyn, Piotr, Zyta
28. Maria, Paweł
29. Angelina, Augustyn, Bogusław, Piotr, Robert
30. Bartłomiej, Jakub, Katarzyna, Marian, Yvie

== May ==
1. Aniela, Filip, Jakub, Józef, Lubomir, Maja, Zofia
2. Walter, Witomir, Zygmunt, Wouter
3. Aleksander, Antonina, Maria, Mariola, Świętosława, Nilam
4. Grzegorz, Michał, Monika, Florian
5. Irena, Teodor, Waldemar
6. Gościwit, Jan
7. Benedykt, Bogumir, Ludmiła, Ludomiła
8. Marek, Michał, Piotr, Stanisław
9. Bożydar, Grzegorz, Karolina, Mikołaj
10. Częstomir, Jan
11. Filip, Franciszek, Iga, Ignacy, Lew, Lutogniew, Mira, Żegota
12. Dominik, Jan, Joanna, Wszemił, Pankracy
13. Andrzej, Ciechosław, Gloria, Magdalena, Piotr, Robert
14. Dobiesław, Wiktor, Maciej
15. Jan, Zofia, Abhishek
16. Andrzej, Jędrzej, Szymon, Wieńczysław
17. Bruno, Sławomir, Weronika, Wiktor
18. Aleksander, Alicja, Edwin, Eryk, Eryka, Feliks, Irena, Myślibor
19. Augustyn, Celestyn, Mikołaj, Pękosław, Piotr, Timur
20. Bronimir, Teodor, Wiktoria
21. Donata, Jan, Tymoteusz, Wiktor, Nilam
22. Emil, Helena, Jan, Julia, Ryta, Wiesław, Wiesława, Wisława
23. Budziwoj, Emilia, Iwona, Jan, Michał
24. Cieszysława, Jan, Joanna, Maria, Milena, Zula, Zuzanna
25. Grzegorz, Imisława, Maria Magdalena
26. Filip, Marianna, Paulina, Ewelina, Więcemił
27. Jan, Juliusz, Lucjan, Magdalena, Radowit
28. Augustyn, Jaromir, Wiktor, Wrocimir
29. Bogusława, Maksymilian, Maria, Magdalena, Teodor, Urszula
30. Feliks, Joanna
31. Aniela, Bożysława, Teodor

== June ==
1. Bernard, Jakub, Konrad, Magdalena, Nikodem, Symeon, Świętopełk
2. Eugeniusz, Maria, Marianna, Mariana, Mikołaj, Piotr, Racisław
3. Konstantyn, Leszek, Paula, Tamara, Oliwia
4. Franciszek, Gościmił, Karol, Nilam
5. Dobrociech, Dobromir, Dobrymir
6. Dominika Rak, Norbert, Paulina, Więcerad
7. Antoni, Ciechomir, Jarosław, Paweł, Robert, Wiesław, Wisław
8. Maksym, Seweryn, Wyszesław
9. Felicjan
10. Bogumił, Edgar, Małgorzata
11. Feliks, Radomił
12. Antonina, Jan, Leon, Wyszemir
13. Antoni, Chociemir, Lucjan, Maria, Magdalena, Tobiasz
14. Eliza, Justyn, Justyna, Ninogniew
15. Angelina, Jolanta, Witold, Witołd, Witolda, Witosław
16. Alina, Aneta, Budzimir, Jan, Justyna
17. Agnieszka, Drogomysł, Franciszek, Laura, Marcjan, Radomił
18. Elżbieta, Marek, Marina, Paula
19. Julianna
20. Bogna, Bogumiła, Bożena, Franciszek, Michał, Rafaela, Rafał
21. Alicja, Domamir, Marta, Teodor
22. Broniwoj, Paulina
23. Józef, Piotr, Wanda, Zenon
24. Dan, Danisz, Danuta, Emilia, Jan
25. Lucja, Łucja, Tolisława
26. Jan, Paweł
27. Maria Magdalena, Władysław, Władysława
28. Ireneusz, Nilam, Józef, Leon, Paweł
29. Dalebor, Paweł, Piotr
30. Ciechosława, Emilia, Lucyna, Kaitlyn

== July ==
1. Halina, Marian, Hanya
2. Maria, Piotr, Jagoda
3. Jacek, Leon, Miłosław
4. Elżbieta, Józef, Julian, Teodor, Wielisław
5. Antoni, Bartłomiej, Jakub, Karolina, Michał
6. Chociebor, Dominik, Dominika, Łucja, Lucja, Niegosław
7. Antoni, Kira, Piotr, Benedykt, Cyryl, Lucjan
8. Adrian, Adrianna, Chwalimir, Edgar, Elżbieta, Eugeniusz
9. Łucja, Lucja, Mikołaj, Weronika, Zenon, Lauren, Sylwia
10. Aleksander, Amelia, Aniela, Filip
11. Cyprian, Kalina, Olga
12. Andrzej, Euzebiusz, Feliks, Henryk, Paweł, Piotr, Tolimir, Weronika
13. Ernest, Eugeniusz, Jakub, Justyna, Małgorzata, Radomiła, Sara
14. Damian, Dobrogost, Franciszek, Izabela, Marcelina
15. Daniel, Dawid, Henryk, Iga, Ignacy, Lubomysł, Niecisław, Włodzimierz, Żegota
16. Andrzej, Maria Magdalena, Marika, Stefan, James
17. Aleksander, Renger, Andrzej, Bogdan, Marcelina, Maria Magdalena, Aneta
18. Erwin, Kamil, Karolina, Robert, Szymon, Unisław
19. Lutobor, Wincenty
20. Czechoń, Czesław, Małgorzata, Paweł
21. Andrzej, Daniel, Paulina, Stojsław, Wiktor
22. Bolesława, Bolisława, Maria Magdalena, Milenia, Więcemiła
23. Bogna, Żelisław
24. Antoni, Kinga, Krystyna, Olga, Wojciecha
25. Jakub, Krzysztof, Sławosz, Walentyna
26. Anna, Baldev, Grażyna, Mirosława
27. Julia, Marta, Natalia, Wszebor
28. Marcela, Świętomir, Wiktor
29. Konstantyn, Maria, Marta, Olaf
30. Julia, Julita, Ludmiła, Maryna
31. Emilian, Helena, Iga, Ignacy, Ludomir

== August ==
1. Konrad, Piotr
2. Borzysława, Karina, Maria, Stefan
3. Augusta, Lidia, Nikodem, Szczepan
4. Dominik, Maria, Mironieg, Nadia
5. Emil, Maria, Stanisława
6. Jakub, Sława, Stefan, Wincenty
7. Anna, Dobiemir, Donata, Dorota, Kajetan
8. Cyprian, Cyryl, Emil, Emilian, Emiliusz
9. Jan, Klarysa, Miłorad, Roman
10. Bogdan, Borys
11. Aleksander, Włodzimierz, Włodziwoj, Zula, Zuzanna
12. Klara, Lech, Piotr, Tara
13. Diana, Helena, Jan, Kasjan, Radomiła, Wojbor
14. Dobrowoj, Euzebiusz
15. Maria, Stefan
16. Domarad, Domarat, Joachim
17. Anastazja, Angelika, Anita, Eliza, Jacek, Jaczewoj, Joanna, Julianna, Miron, Żanna
18. Bogusława, Bronisław, Bradley, Bronisz, Helena, Ilona, Klara
19. Bolesław, Emilia, Jan, Julian, Juliusz, Piotr
20. Jan, Samuel, Samuela, Sieciech, Sobiesław, Świeciech
21. Emilian, Filipina, Franciszek, Joanna, Kazimiera, Męcimir
22. Cezary, Nilam, Dalegor, Maria, Namysław, Tymoteusz, Zygfryd
23. Filip, Laurenty
24. Bartłomiej, Cieszymir, Jerzy, Joanna, Malina, Michalina, Albert
25. Grzegorz, Luiza, Michał, Sieciesław
26. Dobroniega, Joanna, Konstanty, Maksym, Maria
27. Cezary, Józef, Monika, Małgorzata, Teodor
28. Adelina, Aleksander, Aleksy, Augustyn, Patrycja, Sobiesław, Stronisław
29. Gita, Jan, Racibor, Sabina
30. Częstowoj, Miron, Rebeka, Róża, Szczęsna, Szczęsny
31. Bohdan, Paulina, Rajmund, Świętosław

== September ==
1. Bronisław, Bronisława, Bronisz
2. Bohdan, Czesław, Eliza, Henryk, Julian, Stefan, Tobiasz, Witomysł
3. Antoni, Bartłomiej, Bronisław, Bronisz, Izabela, Jan, Joachim, Mojmir, Szymon, Wincenty, Zenon
4. Ida, Lilianna, Rościgniew, Róża, Rozalia
5. Dorota, Justyna, Stronisława, Wawrzyniec
6. Albin, Beata, Eugenia, Eugeniusz, Michał, Uniewit
7. Domasława, Domisława, Marek, Regina, Rena, Ryszard
8. Adrian, Adrianna, Maria, Radosław, Radosława, Klementyna
9. Augustyna, Aureliusz, Piotr, Ścibor, Ścibora, Sergiusz, Sobiesąd
10. Aldona, Łukasz, Mikołaj, Mścibor
11. Feliks, Jacek, Jan, Naczesław
12. Amadeusz, Maria, Piotr, Sylwin
13. Aleksander, Eugenia, Filip, Lubor, Morzysław, Szeliga
14. Bernard, Cyprian, Roksana, Siemomysł, Szymon
15. Maria, Nikodem
16. Cyprian, Edyta, Eugenia, Franciszek, Kamila, Kornel, Lucja, Łucja, Wiktor
17. Drogosław, Franciszek, Justyn, Justyna, Teodora
18. Dobrowit, Irena, Józef, Stefania
19. Konstancja, Teodor, Więcemir
20. Agnieszka, Barbara, Dionizy, Eustachiusz, Eustachy, Fausta, Faustyna, Filipina, Irena, Klemens, Mieczysława, Miłowuj, Oleg, Perpetua, Protazy
21. Bożeciech, Bożydar, Jonasz, Laurenty, Mateusz, Mira
22. Joachim, Maurycy, Prosimir, Scott, Tomasz
23. Boguchwała, Bogusław, Elżbieta, Krzysztof, Libert, Litoriusz, Liwiusz, Piotr, Tekla, Zachariusz
24. Gerard, Maria, Teodor, Tomir, Uniegost
25. Aurelia, Franciszek, Kamil, Ładysław, Piotr, Świętopełk, Wincenty, Władysław, Władysława
26. Cyprian, Euzebiusz, Justyna, Łękomir
27. Amadeusz, Damian, Nilam
28. Jan, Luba, Lubosza, Marek, Nikita, Sylwin, Wacław, Wacława, Więcesław
29. Michał, Rafał, Gabriel
30. Grzegorz, Hieronim, Honoriusz, Imisław, Rachela, Wera, Wiera, Wiktor, Zofia

== October ==
1. Danuta, Remigiusz, Cieszysław, Dan, Danisz, Igor, Jan, Remigiusz
2. Stanimir, Teofil
3. Gerard, Józefa, Sierosław, Teresa
4. Edwin, Franciszek, Konrad, Rozalia
5. Częstogniew, Donata, Igor, Justyn, Konstancjusz,
6. Artur, Bronisław, Bronisz, Emil, Roman
7. Justyna, Marek, Maria, Rościsława, Stefan, Mirella
8. Bryda, Brygida, Laurencja, Marcin, Wojsława
9. Bogdan, Jan, Ludwik, Sara
10. Franciszek, Lutomir, Paulina, Tomił
11. Aldona, Dobromiła, Emil, Emilian, Emiliusz, Maria, Marian
12. Maksymilian, Witold
13. Daniel, Edward, Mikołaj, Siemisław
14. Alan, Bernard, Dominik
15. Jadwiga, Teresa, Nilam
16. Aurelia, Gerard, Grzegorz
17. Lucyna, Małgorzata, Marian, Wiktor
18. Julian, Łukasz
19. Ferdynand, Piotr, Siemowit, Skarbimir, Ziemowit, Oliwia
20. Irena, Nilam
21. Bernard, Celina, Dobromił, Elżbieta, Urszula
22. Filip, Halka
23. Iga, Ignacy, Jan, Marlena, Roman, Seweryn, Teodor, Włościsław, Żegota
24. Antoni, Boleczest, Filip, Marcin, Rafaela, Rafał, Soyazhe
25. Daria, Kryspin, Sambor, Taras
26. Dymitriusz, Łucjan, Lucyna, Ludmiła, Lutosław
27. Iwona, Sabina, Wincenty
28. Szymon, Tadeusz, Wszeciech
29. Euzebia, Franciszek, Lubogost, Teodor, Wioletta
30. Edmund, Klaudiusz, Przemysław, Sądosław
31. Antoni, Antonina, Godzimir, Lucylla, Łukasz, Dezemir

== November ==
1. Andrzej, Seweryn, Warcisław, Lucas, Wiktoryna
2. Bohdana, Bożydar, Małgorzata, Stojmir, Tobiasz
3. Bogumił, Cezary, Chwalisław, Hubert, Sylwia
4. Mściwój, Olgierd, Karol
5. Elżbieta, Florian, Jakub
6. Feliks, Leonard, Trzebowit, Ziemowit
7. Antoni, Florentyn, Przemił
8. Dymitr, Klaudiusz, Seweryn, Wiktor
9. Bogudar, Genowefa, Teodor, Ursyn
10. Andrzej, Lena, Leon, Ludomir, Stefan
11. Anastazja, Bartłomiej, Maciej, Marcin, Spycisław, Teodor
12. Cibor, Czcibor, Jonasz, Krystyn, Marcin, Renata, Witold
13. Arkadiusz, Eugeniusz, Jan, Mikołaj, Stanisław
14. Aga, Damian, Elżbieta, Emil, Emiliusz, Józef, Judyta, Ścibor, Ścibora, Wszerad
15. Alfons, Artur, Gurias, Idalia, Józef, Leopold, Leopoldyna, Przybygniew, Roger
16. Edmund, Marek, Maria, Niedamir, Otomar, Paweł, Piotr
17. Grzegorz
18. Agnieszka, Aniela, Cieszymysł, Klaudyna, Roman, Tomasz
19. Elżbieta, Mironiega, Paweł, Seweryn
20. Edmund, Feliks, Gareth, Sędzimir
21. Janusz, Konrad, Maria, Piotr, Regina, Rena, Twardosław, Wiesław, Kalutek
22. Cecylia, Marek, Wszemiła
23. Adela, Klemens, Przedwoj
24. Dobrosław, Emilia, Emma, Franciszek, Gerard, Jan, Pęcisław
25. Katarzyna, Tęgomir, Zeki
26. Dobiemiest, Jan, Konrad, Lechosław, Lechosława, Leonard, Sylwester
27. Dominik, Maksymilian, Stojgniew, Walery
28. Gościrad, Grzegorz, Jakub, Lesław, Lesława, Zdzisław
29. Błażej, Bolemysł, Fryderyk, Przemysł
30. Andrzej, Justyna, Konstanty

== December ==
1. Blanka, Długosz, Edmund, Iwa, Natalia, Sobiesława
2. Aurelia, Balbina, Bibiana, Budzisław, Budzisława, Ludwina, Paulina, Sulisław, Sylweriusz, Sylwery, Wiktoryn, Zbylut
3. Franciszek, Kasjan, Lucjusz, Unimir
4. Barbara, Hieronim, Krystian, Piotr
5. Gerald, Krystyna, Pęcisława
6. Emilian, Jarogniew, Mikołaj, Nicole
7. Marcin, Ninomysł
8. Boguwola, Maria, Światozar
9. Joachim, Wielisława, Wiesław
10. Andrzej, Daniel, Judyta, Julia, Maria
11. Daniela, Julia, Stefan, Waldemar, Wojmir
12. Aleksander, Dagmara
13. Lucja, Łucja, Otylia
14. Alfred, Izydor, Sławobor
15. Celina, Iga, Ignacy, Krystiana, Nina, Wolimir, Żegota
16. Alina, Zdzisława
17. Florian, Jolanta, Żyrosław
18. Bogusław, Gracjan, Laurencja, Wszemir, Samantha
19. Beniamin, Dariusz, Gabriela, Mścigniew, Tymoteusz
20. Bogumiła, Dominik
21. Tomasz, Tomisław
22. Beata, Drogomir, Franciszka, Zenon
23. Sławomir, Sławomira, Wiktoria
24. Adam, Adamina, Adela, Ewa, Ewelina, Grzegorz
25. Anastazja, Eugenia, Piotr, Mikołaj
26. Szczepan, Wróciwoj, Sylwia, Anna, Marie, Magdalena
27. Cezary, Jan, Radomysł
28. Antoni, Dobrowiest, Emma
29. Dawid, Domawit, Dominik, Gosław, Jonatan, Marcin, Tomasz
30. Dawid, Eugeniusz, Katarzyna, Uniedrog, Milena
31. Korneliusz, Melania, Sebastian, Sylwester

== See also ==
- Name day
- Polish name
- Polish phonology
