= Wielimir =

Wielemir
- Gender: male
- Name day: October 28

Origin
- Origin: Slavic
- Meaning: wiele ("great, more") + mir ("peace, prestige")

Other names
- Variant forms: Velimir, Wielemir

Wielimir is a Polish masculine given name, derived from Slavic wiele ("great, more") + mir ("peace, prestige"). In the Sorbian languages, it is spelled Wjeleměr. It gave its name to Wielmierzowice.
