= Yaropolk =

Yaropolk (Old East Slavic: Ꙗрополкъ, Ꙗроплъкъ, Russian: Ярополк) is an masculine East Slavic dithematic given name. Notable people with the name include:

- Yaropolk I of Kiev (Yaropolk Svyatoslavich) (about 950–980)
- Yaropolk Iziaslavich (about 1050–about 1100)
- Yaropolk II of Kiev (Yaropolk Vladimirovich), (1082–1139)
- Yaropolk Rostislavich
- Yaropolk III Yaroslavich
- Yaropolk, son of Vladimir of Novgorod
