= Stanimir =

Stanimir (Cyrillic script: Станимир) is a Slavic origin given name built of two parts: stani "to become" and mir "peace, glory, prestige" or "world", meaning "to become a world" (see Book of Genesis 1:3). Feminine forms are: Stanimira and Stanimirka. Nicknames: Stanko, Staszek, Staś, Mirek, Mirko. The name may refer to:

- Stanimir Atanasov (born 1976), Bulgarian sprint canoeist
- Stanimir Dimitrov (born 1972), former Bulgarian footballer
- Stanimir Dimov-Valkov (born 1978), Bulgarian defender
- Stanimir Georgiev (born 1975), retired Bulgarian professional football forward
- Stanimir Gospodinov (born 1975), football defender from Bulgaria
- Stanimir Ilchev (born 1953), Bulgarian politician and Member of the European Parliament
- Stanimir Milošković (born 1983), Serbian footballer
- Stanimir Mitev (born 1985), Bulgarian footballer
- Stanimir Penchev (born 1959), retired Bulgarian pole vaulter
- Stanimir Stoilov (born 1967), former Bulgarian footballer
- Stanimir Todorov (born 1982), Bulgarian pair skater
- Stanimir Vukićević (born 1948), the Ambassador Serbia to the Russian Federation

== See also ==
- Slavic names
