= Chwalibog =

Chwalibog may refer to:

- Chwalibogowice, a village in the Świętokrzyskie Voivodeship, Poland
- Chwalibogowo (disambiguation), a name of several villages in Poland,
- Chwalibożyce, a village in the Lower Silesian Voivodeship, Poland
