= Jaromar =

Jaromar is a Slavic masculine given name. It is the Polabian form of the West Slavic name, Jaromír/Jaromir.

- Jaromar, also Jaromar of Rügen, is the name of several members of Rügen's princely house:
  - Jaromar I (1141–1218), Prince of Rügen
  - Jaromar II (1218–1260), Prince of Rügen
  - Jaromar III (1249–1285), Prince of Rügen, co-regent
- Jaromar (bishop) (1267–1294), Bishop of Cammin

== See also ==
- Jaromarsburg
- Jaroměř, Czech town
