= Veselinović =

Veselinović (Serbian Cyrillic: Веселиновић, pronounced [ʋeselǐːnoʋitɕ]) is a Serbian patronymic surname derived from a masculine given name Veselin. It may refer to:

- Ana Veselinović (born 1988), Montenegrin tennis player
- Borko Veselinović (born 1986), Serbian footballer
- Dalibor Veselinović (born 1987), Serbian footballer
- Mlađa Veselinović (1915–2012), Serbian actor
- Mladen Veselinović (born 1992), Serbian footballer
- Todor Veselinović (born 1930), former Serbian football player and coach
