= Slava (given name) =

Slava is a given name in Slavic countries.

Slava is a common nickname for masculine Slavic names beginning or ending with "slav", e.g. Vyacheslav, Stanislav, Yaroslav, Sviatoslav, Rostislav, Mstislav, Slavomir or feminine Slavic names beginning or ending with "slava", e.g. Miroslava, Yaroslava, Slavomira. Notable people commonly known by this given name include:

- Desi Slava (born 1979), Bulgarian musician (Desislava)
- Slava (singer) (born 1980), Russian singer (Anastasia)
- Slava Bykov (born 1960), Russian ice hockey player and coach (Vyacheslav)
- Slava Fetisov (born 1958), Russian ice hockey player (Viacheslav)
- Slava Frolova (born 1976), Ukrainian television presenter (Vyacheslava)
- Slava Gerovitch (born 1963), American historian of Russian science (Vyacheslav)
- Slava Kozlov (born 1972), Russian ice hockey player (Vyacheslav)
- Slava KPSS (born 1990), Russian musician (Vyacheslav)
- Slava Kravtsov (born 1987), Ukrainian basketball player (Viacheslav)
- Slava Kurilov (1936–1998) Soviet, Canadian and Israeli oceanographer (Stanislav)
- Slava Medvedenko (born 1979), Ukrainian basketball player (Stanislav)
- Slava Mogutin (born 1974), New York-based Russian artist and author (Yaroslav)
- Slava Polunin (born 1950), Russian performance artist (Vyacheslav)
- Slava Raškaj (1877–1906), Croatian painter, birth name Slavomira
- Slava Rychkov (born 1975), Russian-Italian-French physicist and mathematician (Vyacheslav)
- Slava Stetsko (1920–2003), Ukrainian politician and World War II veteran (Yaroslava)
- Slava Tsukerman (born 1940), Russian Jewish film director (Vladislav)
- Slava Turyshev, Russian physicist working in the US (Vyacheslav)
- Slava Vakarchuk (born 1975), Ukrainian musician, politician and activist (Svyatoslav)
- Slava Voynov (born 1990), Russian ice hockey player (Vyacheslav)
- Slava Zaitsev (1938—2023), Russian artist (Vyacheslav)

Slava is also found as a standalone masculine given name:

- Slava Amiragov (1926–1990), Belarusian rower
- Slava Grigoryan (born 1976), Australian musician of Armenian/Kazakh origin
- Slava Metreveli (1936–1998), Georgian football player and manager

Slava is also found in pseudonyms:

- Slava Marlow, stage name of Artyom Artyomovich Gotlib (born 1999), Russian musician

== See also ==
- Slavica (disambiguation), feminine diminutive form
- Slaven (given name), Slavko, Slaviša
