= Nebojša =

Nebojša (Cyrillic script: Небојша pronounced [nɛ̌bɔːjʃa]) is a Serbian given name, meaning "fearless". People with the name include:

== In arts and entertainment ==
- Nebojša Bradić (born 1956), Serbian theater director
- Nebojša Glogovac (born 1969), award-winning Serbian actor
- Nebojša Malešević (born 1983), Bosnian Serb fashion model
- Nebojša Pajkić (born 1951), writer and professor of film dramaturgy

== In government and politics ==
- Nebojša Čović (born 1958), Serbian politician and businessman
- Nebojša Kaluđerović (born 1955), Montenegrin politician and diplomat
- Nebojša Koharović (born 1963), Croatian diplomat and the current Croatian Ambassador to the People's Republic of China
- Nebojša Krstić (born 1957), Advisor of the President of Serbia for public relations
- Nebojša Medojević (born 1966), politician in Montenegro
- Nebojša Pavković (1946–2025), Serbian military officer and convicted war criminal, chief of the General Staff of Yugoslavia (2000–2002)
- Nebojša Radmanović (born 1949), Bosnian Serb politician

== In sport ==
=== Basketball ===
- Nebojša Bogavac, professional Montenegrin basketball player
- Nebojša Joksimović (basketball) (born 1981), Slovenian professional basketball player
- Nebojša Popović (1923–2001), Serbian basketball player, coach and administrator

=== Football (soccer) ===
- Nebojša Gudelj (born 1968), former Yugoslav/Bosnian association footballer
- Nebojša Jelenković (born 1978), Serbian football midfielder
- Nebojša Joksimović (footballer) (born 1981), Serbian football player
- Nebojša Krupniković (born 1973), Serbian football player
- Nebojša Marinković (born 1986), Serbian footballer
- Nebojša Novaković (born 1964), Bosnian-Swedish former football player
- Nebojša Pavlović (born 1981), Serbian football player
- Nebojša Pejić (born 1988), Bosnian Serb football midfielder
- Nebojša Petrović, Serbian football manager and former player
- Nebojša Šćepanović (born 1967), former Montenegrin football midfielder
- Nebojša Skopljak (born 1987), Serbian football player
- Nebojša Šodić (born 1985), Bosnian Serb professional football defender
- Nebojša Vučićević (1962–2022), former Serbian football player
- Nebojša Zlatarić (1953–2014), Serbian former striker

=== Other sports ===
- Nebojša Đorđević (born 1973), Serbian tennis player
- Nebojša Grahovac (born 1984), Bosnian professional handballer
- Nebojša Popović (handballer) (born 1947), Serbian former handball player
- Nebojša Jovanović (born 1997), Serbian road bicycle racer

== In other fields ==
- Nebojša Radunović, university professor of Obstetrics and Gynecology at University of Belgrade School of Medicine

== See also ==
- Yugoslav submarine Nebojša
- Slavic names
