= Gniewomir =

Gniewomir is a given name derived from the Slavic elements: gniew (anger) and mir (peace, glory or world), and may refer to:

- Gniewomierz, a village in the administrative district of Gmina Legnickie Pole, Lower Silesian Voivodeship, Poland
- Gniewomirowice, a village in the administrative district of Gmina Miłkowice, Lower Silesian Voivodeship, Poland
