= Jezdić =

Jezdić (Serbian Cyrillic: Јездић) is a Serbian surname, a patronymic derived from Jezda, a diminutive of Jezdimir. Bearers of the surname are widespread throughout former Yugoslavia. It may refer to:

- Jevrem Jezdić (1916–1997), Yugoslav historian, publicist and writer
- Ljuba Jezdić (1884–1927), Serbian guerrilla fighter
- Nenad Jezdić, Serbian actor
- Oliver Jezdić, Yugoslav musician, member of Galija

== See also ==
- Jezdići, village in Serbia
- Prijezdići, village in Serbia
