= Vojislava =

Vojislava (Serbian Cyrillic: Војислава) is a South Slavic given name, a feminine form of Vojislav; it consists of two parts: "Voj" - which means "war, warrior", and "slav" - which means "glory, fame".

== People ==
- Vojislava Vojinović (fl. 1359), Serbian noblewoman, daughter of Vojvoda Vojin, married Brajko Branivojević
- Vojislava Lukić (born 1987), Serbian former professional tennis player
- Vojislava Popović, Serbian former figure skater, now coach

== Other ==
- 5397 Vojislava, an asteroid
