= Vito =

- Pronunciation: Italian: [ˈviːto]
- Gender: Male
- Language: Italian

Origin
- Meaning: From the Latin word "vita", meaning "life"
- Region of origin: Italy

Vito is an Italian name that is derived from the Latin word "vita", meaning "life". It is a modern form of the Latin name Vitus, meaning "life-giver," as in San Vito or Saint Vitus, the patron saint of dogs and a heroic figure in southern Italian folklore.

There is also a Slavic name "Vitomir" that is shortened to "Vito", but has a different etymology.

The name "Vito" is sometimes confused with the German name "Wido," which is derived from Ancient Germanic.

== People ==
People with this name include:

- San Vito dei Normanni, Saint Vito Protector of the Normans at sea, since medieval times
- Vito R. Bertoldo, American Medal of Honor recipient
- Vito Dimitrijević, a Yugoslavian former professional footballer
- Vito Dumas, Argentine sailor and travel-writer, who sailed solo around the world
- Vito Fossella, American politician from New York
- Vito Genovese, Italian-American mob boss
- Vito LoGrasso, American professional wrestler
- Vito Mannone, Italian footballer
- Vincent "Don Vito" Margera, actor and TV personality
- Vito Molinari (1929–2025), Italian stage and film director
- Vito Nikolić, Montenegrin poet
- Vito Positano, Italian diplomat
- Vito Postiglione, Italian auto racing driver
- Vito Rizzuto (1946–2013), Canadian mobster
- Vito Russo, American activist
- Vito Schlickmann (1928-2023), Brazilian Roman Catholic prelate
- Vito Scotti (1918-1996), American director
- Vito Thomaselli, former professional wrestler and podcast personality
- Victor Vito (rugby player), New Zealand rugby union and rugby sevens player
- Vitellia gens, ancient Roman family

=== Fictional characters ===
- Vito Corleone, titular character of the novel The Godfather
- Vito Spatafore, The Sopranos character
- Vito Scaletta, the protagonist of the game Mafia II and one of the main characters of Mafia III
