= Vlasta =

Vlasta may refer to:

- Vlasta (given name)
- Vlasta (mythology), a leader in the Maidens' War in Czech mythology
- The Death of Vlasta, an opera by Otakar Ostrčil
- Vlasta (magazine), Czech magazine for women
