= Svetozar =

Svetozar (Cyrillic script: Светозар) is a Slavic origin given name and may refer to:

- Svetozar Boroević (1856–1920), Austro-Hungarian Field Marshal
- Svetozar Čiplić (born 1965), Serbian politician
- Svetozar Đanić (1917–1941), Serbian footballer
- Svetozar Delić (1885–1967), the first communist mayor of Zagreb, Croatia
- Svetozár Hurban-Vajanský (1847–1916), Slovak poet, writer, literary critic and politician
- Svetozar Gligorić (1923–2012), Serbian chess grandmaster
- Svetozar Ivačković (1844–1924), post-Romantic Serbian architect
- Svetozar Koljević (1930–2016), author, historian and translator
- Svetozar Marković (1846–1875), Serbian political activist
- Svetozar Marović (born 1955), lawyer and a Montenegrin politician
- Svetozar Mijin (born 1978), Serbian footballer
- Svetozar Miletić (1826–1901), advocate, politician, mayor of Novi Sad, and political leader of Serbs in Vojvodina
- Svetozar Pribićević (1875–1936), Serbian politician from Croatia who worked hard for creation of unitaristic Yugoslavia
- Svetozar Ristovski (born 1972), Macedonian film director
- Svetozar Šapurić (1960–2024), Serbian football player and manager
- Svetozár Stračina (1940–1996), Slovak music composer
- Svetozar Vujković (1899–1949), Serbian police officer and head of the Banjica Concentration Camp in German-occupied Serbia
- Svetozar Vujović (1940–1993), Bosnian-Serb football player
- Svetozar Vukmanović-Tempo (1912–2000), Montenegrin communist and member of the Central Committee of the League of Communists of Yugoslavia

== See also ==
- Slavic names
