= Slavica =

Slavica may refer to:

== People ==
- Slavica Đukić (born 1960), Serbian handball player
- Slavica Ecclestone (born 1958), Croatian fashion model
- Slavica Jeremić (born 1957), Serbian handball player

== Other ==
- Slavica alphabet, an experimental Serbo-Croatian language alphabet
- Slavica, Croatia, a village in Primorje-Gorski Kotar, Croatia
- Slavica (film), a 1947 Yugoslav drama film
- Serbian equivalent of Karen (slang)

== See also ==
- Slava (given name)
