= Zdravković =

Zdravković (Cyrillic script: Здравковић) is a Serbian surname derived from a masculine given name Zdravko. Notable individuals with this surname include:

- Dragan Zdravković (born 1959), middle-distance runner
- Lidija Zdravković, Serbian-British geotechnical engineer
- Milija Zdravković (1765–1814), voivode of the First Serbian Uprising and the father of Milosav and Dobrosav
- Milosav Zdravković (1787–1854), voivode of the first and second Serbian revolution
- Novica Zdravković (1947–2021), folk singer
- Toma Zdravković (1938–1991), folk singer
- Živojin Zdravković (1914–2001), conductor and professor
