= Květa =

Květa is a Slavic female given name, derived from the Czech word květ meaning flower, blossom. Květa is also a nickname form of Květoslava (pronounced kvye-taw-slah-vah.)

== Other forms ==
- Slovak: Kveta, Kvetava, Kvetana
- Russian: Cvetana
- Bulgarian: Cveta, Cvetana, Cvetomira
- Serbian: Cveta, Cvetana, Cvetislava, Cvetoslava, Cvetimira, Cvijeta
- Croatian: Cveta, Cvetana, Cvetislava, Cvetoslava, Cvetimira

== Name Days ==
- Czech: 20 June (Květa), 8 December (Květoslava)

== Famous bearers ==
- Květa Fialová, Czech actress
- Květa Peschke, Czech tennis player
- Květa Jeriová, Czech cross country skier
- Květa Legátová, Czech writer
- Květa Kočová, Czech speaker of ČSSD
- Květa Pacovská, Czech painter and sculptor
- Květoslava Kořínková, Czech politician and pedagogue

== See also ==
- Slavic names
