= Chwalibogowo Palace =

- Pałac w Chwalibogowie
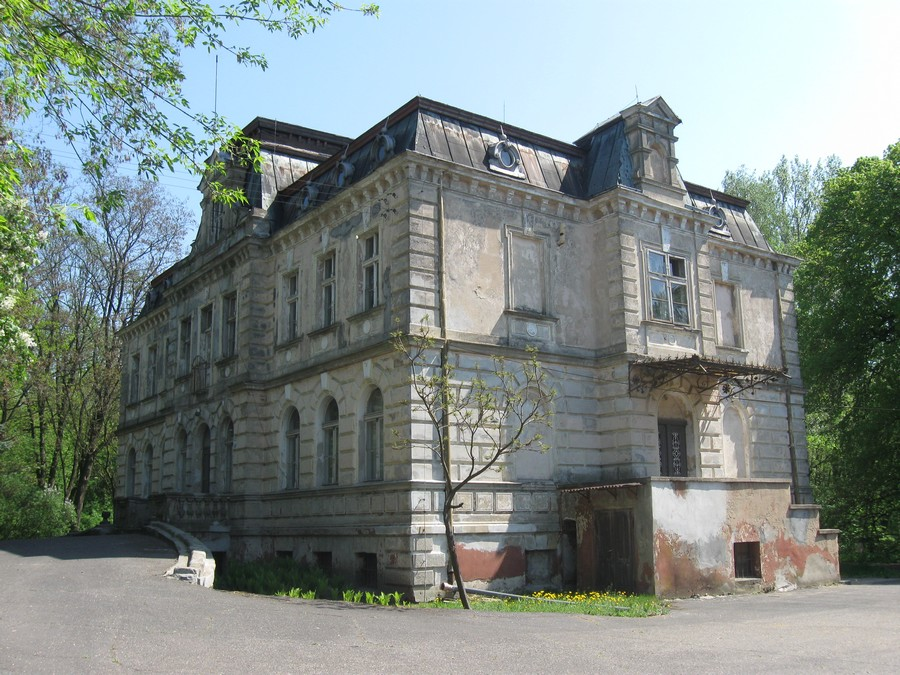
- Chwalibogowo Palace

- Location within Poland

General information
- Type: Palace
- Architectural style: Renaissance
- Location: Chwalibogowo, Poland
- Coordinates: 52°28′10″N 17°52′10″E

Chwalibogowo Palace is a palace in Chwalibogowo (Września County, Poland).

== Description ==
The palace is an example of French Renaissance architecture that found in Wielkopolska. Storey building with a slightly protruding risalit in the center, was covered with a mansard roof. The palace in the nineteenth century it was owned by the family Kęszyckich. The last owner was a Lieutenant Colonel A. Myszkowski.

== History ==
By 1920 the village was in the hands of the Czech Germanised von Skrbenskich family. Rudolph von Skrbensky built a palace and a water tower still standing in the local park. After the political changes in 1945 manor allocated to Manufacturing cooperative set up by the local peasants and workers.
