= Vlastimir (name) =

Vlastimir was a medieval Serbian prince. The name Vlastimir (Serbian: Властимир) is of the Slavic roots vlastiti ("to rule") and mir ("peace"). It may refer to:

- Vlastimir Đorđević (born 1948), Serbian colonel general
- Vlastimir Jovanović (footballer) (born 1985), Bosnian football defensive midfielder
- Vlastimir Pavlović Carevac (1895–1965), Serbian violinist and conductor
- Vlastimir Đuza Stojiljković (1929–2015), Serbian actor
- Vlastimir Trajković (1947–2017), Serbian composer and professor
- Vlastimir Vukadinović (born 1982), Serbian basketball coach
- Vlastimir Sretenovic (born 1991), Serbian rugby player
- Vlastimir Peričić (1927–2000), Serbian composer

== See also ==
- Vlastimil
- Vladimir (disambiguation)
