= Velimirović =

Velimirović (Cyrillic script: Велимировић) is a South Slavic surname, means "son of Velimir", may refer to:

- Dragoljub Velimirović
- Milan Velimirović
- Miloš Velimirović
- Nikolaj Velimirović
- Petar Velimirović
- Pavle Velimirović
- Ranka Velimirović
- Zdravko Velimirović

== See also ==
- Velimir
