= Vojislav =

- Pronunciation: pronounced [ʋǒjislaʋ]
- Gender: Male

Origin
- Origin: Serbian
- Meaning: "war glory", "glorious warrior"
- Region of origin: Balkans

Other names
- Nickname: Voja

Vojislav (Serbian Cyrillic: Војислав, pronounced [ʋǒjislaʋ]) is a Serbian masculine given name, a Slavic dithematic name (of two lexemes), derived from the Slavic words voj ("war, warrior"), and slava ("glory, fame"). Its feminine form is Vojislava.

The first historical encounter of the name is through Serbian ruler Stefan Vojislav, also known as the Prince of the Serbs. He would also found the Serbian dynasty Vojislavljević (992–1091), the second oldest Serbian dynasty after Vlastimirović.

== Notable people ==
- Stefan Vojislav (fl. 1034–43), Serbian ruler
- Vojislav Brajović (born 1949), Serbian actor
- Vojislav Đonović (1921–2008), Serbian jazz guitarist
- Vojislav Ilić (1860–1894), Serbian poet
- Vojislav Jovanović Marambo (1884–1968), Serbian university professor and diplomat
- Vojislav V. Jovanović (1940–2018), Serbian writer
- Vojislav Koštunica (born 1944), Serbian politician
- Vojislav Melić (1940–2006), Yugoslav footballer
- Vojislav Mihailović (born 1951), Serbian politician
- Vojislav Nikčević (1935–2007), Montenegrin linguist
- Vojislav Šešelj (born 1954), Serbian politician
- Vojislav Simić (1924–2025), Serbian musician, conductor, and composer
- Vojislav Vranjković (born 1983), Serbian footballer
- Vojislav Vukčević (1938–2016), Serbian politician

== See also ==
- Polish: Wojsław
- Vojislavljević dynasty
