= Sviatopolk =

Sviatopolk may refer to:

- Sviatopolk I of Kiev (c. 980 – 1019)
- Sviatopolk II of Kiev (1050–1113)

== See also ==
- Świętopełk (disambiguation) Polish version
- Zwentibold German version
- Svatopluk (disambiguation) Czech version
- Svätopluk (disambiguation) Slovak version
- Svante Swedish version
