= Chwalibogowo =

Chwalibogowo may refer to the following places:

- Chwalibogowo, Słupca County in Greater Poland Voivodeship (west-central Poland)
- Chwalibogowo, Września County in Greater Poland Voivodeship (west-central Poland)
- Chwalibogowo, Kuyavian-Pomeranian Voivodeship (north-central Poland)
