= Jarmila =

Jarmila is a Slavic origin female given name. Derived from the Slavic elements jary fierce, strong and mil favour. Similar names are Jaromíra and Jaroslava. Nicknames are Jarka, Jarcza, Jara, Jarina, Jaromilka, Jarmilka, Mila, Jarulinka. The meaning of the name is derived from word "bujarý" which means sprightly, hilarious.

== Name days ==
- Czech: 4 February
- Slovak: 28 April

== Notable people ==
- Jarmila Jeřábková (1912–1989), Czech dancer, choreographer and teacher
- Jarmila Klimešová (born 1981), Czech javelin thrower
- Jarmila Kratochvílová (born 1951), Czech track and field runner
- Jarmila Loukotková (1923-2007), Czech writer and author
- Jarmila Machačová (born 1986), Czech racing cyclist
- Jarmila Müllerová (1901-1944), Czech swimmer
- Jarmila Novotná (1907-1994), Czech actress and soprano singer
- Jarmila Nygrýnová (1953-1999), Czech long jumper
- Jarmila Pacherová, Czechoslovak slalom canoeist
- Jarmila Kukalová-Peck (1930–2024), Czech-born Canadian paleoentomologist
- Jarmila Wolfe (born 1987), Slovak-born Australian tennis player

== Fictional characters ==
- Jarmila, in the poem Máj by Karel Hynek Mácha

== See also ==
- Slavic names
