= Mirek =

Mirek may refer to:

- Mirək, a village in Azerbaijan
- Mirek, an alternative name for the color temperature unit Mired
- Mirek Mazur, Canadian cycling coach of Polish origin
- Mirek Topolánek, Czech politician
- Mirek Switalski, Mexican sports shooter
- Mirek Smíšek, New Zealand artist of Czech origin
- Joanna Mirek, Polish volleyball player
- Debbie Mirek, American writer, co-author of The Star Trek Encyclopedia
