= Bratko Menaion =

13th-century Serbian Orthodox liturgical calendar

- Created: 13th century
- Location: National Library of Serbia
- Author: Bratko
- Purpose: Menaion

Bratko Menaion (Serbian: Братков минеј, romanized: Bratkov minej) is a 13th-century Serbian liturgical calendar book (menaion), written Serbian Orthodox monk-scribe by the name of Bratko. It is the oldest menaion in Serbian literature, written in the Serbian recension of Old Church Slavonic (Old Serbian).

The book is composed of four parts, grouped in "services" of September and November (last fourth of the 13th century), and "festivity" for the rest of the months (first half of the 14th century). The first section (pp. 1–123) was written by presbyter Bratko (thence the name of the manuscript) during the reign of the Serbian king Stefan Vladislav (1234) for a feudal lord by the name of Obrad. The number of russisms and Russian orthography suggests it was made on Russian proposition.

Fragments of a poem of Saint Naum of Ohrid (ca 830–910) is in the book.

== See also ==
- List of medieval Serbian literature
