= Radosław =

Radosław may refer to:

== People ==
- Radosław (given name), list of people with the name
- Radosław Group, codename of a group of Polish rebel fighters during World War II

== Places ==
- Radosław, Lower Silesian Voivodeship (south-west Poland)
- Radosław, Pomeranian Voivodeship (north Poland)
- Radosław, West Pomeranian Voivodeship (north-west Poland)

== See also ==
- Radoslav (disambiguation)
