= Velimir Živojinović =

Velimir Živojinović may refer to:

- Massuka Živojinović (1886–1974)
- Bata Živojinović (1933–2016)
