= Niemira =

Niemira is a Polish surname as well as the feminine variant of the name Niemir. Archaic feminine forms (currently used only colloquially): Niemirzanka (by father), Neimisrzyna (by husband). Notable people with the surname include:

- Karol Niemira (1881–1965), Polish Roman Catholic priest
- Leokadia Niemira (1909–1984), real name of Polish actress Loda Niemirzanka
- Stanisław Niemira (1597–1648), Polish-Lithuanian Commonwealth noble and politician
