= Dobiesław Kmita =

Szreniawa coat of arms used by Dobiesław's branch of the Kmita family.

Dobiesław Kmita (died 1478) was a Polish noble from the Lublin Voivodeship, of the Szreniawa coat of arms. He was one of the signatories of the Second Peace of Toruń in 1466.

He was the youngest son of Mikołaj Kmita and his second wife Małgorzata Michałowska. His brother was Jan Kmita, a Castellan of Przemyśl and Lwów.

Dobiesław Kmita died at the end of August 1478, but before 25 August. As he was a single and had no children, all his property were inherited by his nephews: Piotr Kmita, Stanisław Kmita, Andrzej Kmita and Barbara z Dubiecka.

== Bibliography ==
- Boniecki, Herbarz, t. 10, s. 193;
- F. Kiryk, Dobiesław z Sobienia i Wiśnicza, Polski Słownik Biograficzny, t. 13, 1967-1968, p. 87-88;
- Gąsiorowski, Polscy gwaranci, s. 260; Urzędnicy małopolscy, s. 338.
