= Svante =

Swedish male name

Svante is the shortening for the Swedish male given name Svantepolk. It originates from Slavic ancestors of first prominent Svantes in Sweden. The Slavic languages have the name which is rendered as Sviatopolk in Ukrainian, Russian and Bulgarian, Swiãtopôłk in Kashubian, Świętopełk in Polish, Svatopluk in Czech and Svätopluk in Slovak.

In the 13th century, Svantepolk of Viby (died 1310) settled in Sweden. He was a valued ancestor, well-remembered in his noble Swedish descendants' pedigrees and family lore, and the name Svante was given to many of his descendants.

- Svante, Regent of Sweden (1460–1512), leader of the Swedish government between 1504 and 1512
- Svante Arrhenius (1859–1927), Swedish chemist
- Svante Larsson (born 1955), Swedish footballer
- Svante Lundkvist (1919–1991), Swedish politician
- Svante Thunberg (born 1969), Swedish actor, manager, and producer

== See also ==
- Zwentibold, German version
