= Bogna Krasnodębska-Gardowska =

Polish painter

- Born: 19 March 1900; Sosnowiec, Poland
- Died: 21 January 1986 (aged 85); Kraków, Poland
- Occupation: Painter

Bogna Krasnodębska-Gardowska (19 March 1900 – 21 January 1986) was a Polish painter. Her work was part of the painting event in the art competition at the 1936 Summer Olympics.
