= Yael Nemirovsky =

Israeli electrical engineer

- יעל נמירובסקי
- Born: July 21, 1944 (age 82); Haifa, Mandatory Palestine
- Education: Technion – Israel Institute of Technology
- Known for: Microelectromechanical systems (MEMS), Microoptoelectromechanical systems (MOEMS)
- Awards: Fellow of the IEEE, Fellow of the Institution of Electrical Engineers
- Scientific career
- Fields: Chemistry, Electrical Engineering
- Workplaces: Technion – Israel Institute of Technology, Rafael Advanced Defense Systems, University of Haifa, Kinneret College

Yael Nemirovsky (Hebrew: יעל נמירובסקי; born July 21, 1944) is an Israeli chemist and electrical engineer known for her research in microelectromechanical systems and microoptoelectromechanical systems. She is a professor emerita of electrical engineering at the Technion – Israel Institute of Technology.

== Education and career ==
Nemirovsky was born on July 21, 1944, in Haifa, then part of Mandatory Palestine. She studied chemistry at the Technion, earning a bachelor's degree in 1966 and completing her Ph.D. in 1971. She became a research scientist at Rafael Advanced Defense Systems, also taking an adjunct lecturer position at the Technion – Israel Institute of Technology, where she began working in electrical engineering, on topics including surface acoustic wave devices and optoelectronics.

After working at Rafael from 1972 to 1980, she returned to academia in 1980, as a senior lecturer in electrical engineering at the Technion. She became an associate professor in 1985 and a full professor in 2011. She retired from the Technion as professor emerita in 2013, and from 2012 to 2015 headed the department of electrical engineering at Kinneret College.

She was the founder of BlueBird Optical MEMS Inc., its president from 2001 to 2002, and its chief scientist from 2002 to 2005. Since 2014 she has been chief scientist of TODOS Technologies Ltd., a spin-off from the Technion developing CMOS-based infrared sensors.

== Recognition ==
Nemirovsky was named a Fellow of the IEEE in 1999, "for contributions to compound semiconductor devices and technology". She is also a Fellow of the Institution of Electrical Engineers.
