= Svatopluk =

Svatopluk is a Czech masculine given name. It originates from the Slavic roots svet ('strong') and pluk ('regiment', 'military people'), and can be translated as "strong in regiments", "having strong army". The Slovak form of the name is Svätopluk and the Polish form is Świętopełk. The German name Zwentibold and the Swedish name Svante are derived from Svatopluk. Notable people with the name include:

- Svatopluk I of Moravia (c. 840–894), prince of Great Moravia from 870/871 to 894
- Svatopluk II (died c. 906), a son of Svatopluk I, prince of the Nitrian principality from 894 to c. 906
- Svatopluk, Duke of Bohemia (died 1109), ruler of Bohemia in 1107–1109
- Svatopluk Beneš (1918–2007), Czech actor
- Svatopluk Bouška (born 1947), Czech football player and manager
- Svatopluk Buchta (born 1966), Czech cyclist
- Svatopluk Čech (1846–1908), Czech writer, journalist and poet
- Svatopluk Habanec (born 1969), Czech football player and manager
- Svatopluk Havelka (1925–2009), Czech composer
- Svatopluk Innemann (1896–1945), Czech film director, cinematographer, screenwriter and actor
- Svatopluk Karásek (1942–2020), Czech singer and politician
- Josef Svatopluk Machar (1864–1942), Czech poet and essayist
- Svatopluk Němeček (born 1972), Czech politician and physician
- Svatopluk Pitra (1923–1993), Czech artist and designer of animated films
- Svatopluk Pluskal (1930–2005), Czech footballer
- Jan Svatopluk Presl (1791–1849), Czech natural scientist
- Svatopluk Sládeček (born 1969), Czech architect
- Svatopluk Turek (1900–1972), Czech writer using the pen name T. Svatopluk

== See also ==
- Svätopluk (opera), a Slovak opera by Eugen Suchoň
- Sviatopolk (disambiguation), Ukrainian and Russian version
