= Niemierzyn (disambiguation) =

Niemierzyn is a neighbourhood in Szczecin, Poland.

Niemierzyn may also refer to:

- Niemierzyn Cemetery, a former cemetery in Szczecin
- Niemierzyn Valley, a land formation in Szczecin
- Niemierzyn, Łódź Voivodeship, a village in Łódź Voivodeship, Poland
- Arkońskie-Niemierzyn, a neighbourhood in Szczecin, Poland
