= Ctirad Uher =

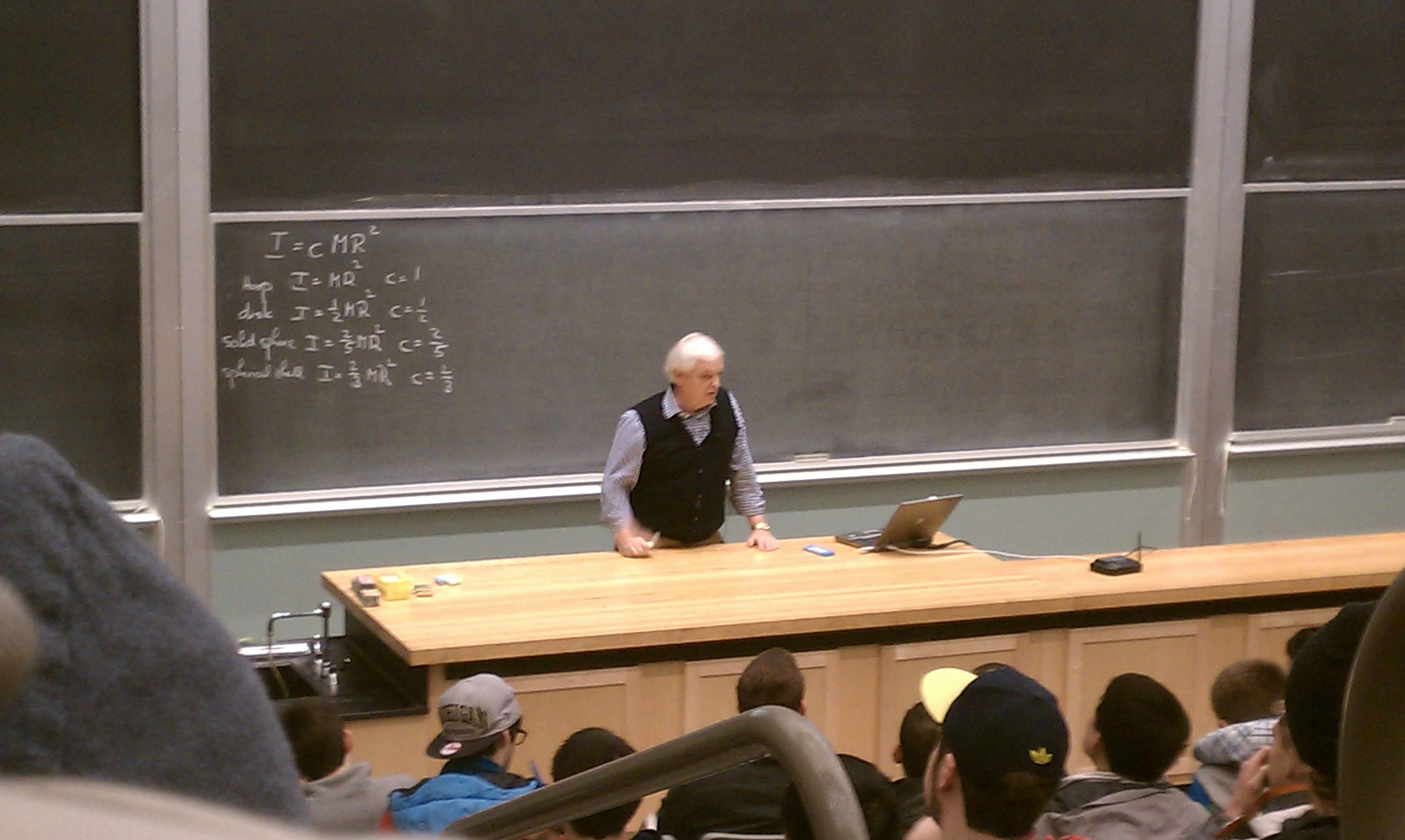
Ctirad Uher during a physics lecture on moment of inertia in winter 2012

Professor Ctirad Uher is the C. Wilbur Peters Collegiate Professor at the University of Michigan in Ann Arbor. Born in Prague, Czech Republic, he graduated from the University of New South Wales, Australia in 1972 and earned his Ph.D. from there in 1979.

== Career ==
He currently teaches in the physics department at the University of Michigan and does research in the field of condensed matter physics. Ctirad Uher was Associate Dean for two years before becoming Chair of the Physics Department in 1994. In 2004, he stepped down from that position. During Uher's administration the Physics Department faculty expanded enormously, from 60 faculty members to 80. Of these 20 new faculty, 19 eventually received tenure. It was also during this time that Martinus Veltman received his Nobel Prize. Before Uher's administration, there were no distinguished professorships in the physics department; afterward, there were six.

=== FOCUS ===
It was during Uher's administration that FOCUS (Frontiers in Optical Coherent and Ultrafast Science) was started, a program that continued until 2010. It was funded at first by an NSF grant and later through the MURI (Multidisciplinary University Research Initiative). Thanks in part to FOCUS, the University of Michigan was top-ranked in atomic/molecular/optical physics in the early 2000s.

=== MCTP ===
It was also during Uher's term that the Michigan Center for Theoretical Physics (MCTP) was established, designed to create an intellectual atmosphere conductive to theoretical physicists, a platform for theoretical research. One of the first faculty members hired for the program was Michael Duff, a leading string theorist. The MCTP held several week-long sessions dedicated to specialized topics, for which experts were brought in from other Universities. Gordon Kane was the director of the MCTP for several years.

=== Center for the Study of Complex Systems ===
In 1998 the Program in Nonlinear Studies began, which in 1999 became the Center for the Study of Complex Systems, an interdisciplinary program studying complex systems that reaches out to many other fields including mathematics, biology, and economics.

== Recognition ==
Uher is a Fellow of the American Physical Society. In 2008, he was chosen for the American Physical Society's Outstanding Referees Program for excellence in peer review.

In 2011, Uher was awarded the Friendship Award by the People's Republic of China.

== Publications ==
- Dyck, Jeffrey S.; Hájek, Pavel; Lošt'ák, Petr; Uher, Ctirad (2002-03-08). "Diluted magnetic semiconductors based on Sb_{2−x}V_{x}Te_{3} (0.01<~x<~0.03)". Physical Review B. 65 (11) 115212. American Physical Society (APS). doi:10.1103/physrevb.65.115212. ISSN 0163-1829.
- Uher, Ctirad (2001). "Chapter 5 Skutterudites: Prospective novel thermoelectrics". Semiconductors and Semimetals. Vol. 69. Elsevier. pp. 139–253. doi:10.1016/s0080-8784(01)80151-4. ISBN 978-0-12-752178-7. ISSN 0080-8784.
- Chen, L. D.; Kawahara, T.; Tang, X. F.; Goto, T.; Hirai, T.; Dyck, J. S.; Chen, W.; Uher, C. (2001-08-15). "Anomalous barium filling fraction and n-type thermoelectric performance of Ba_{y}Co_{4}Sb_{12}". Journal of Applied Physics. 90 (4). AIP Publishing: 1864–1868. Bibcode:2001JAP....90.1864C. doi:10.1063/1.1388162. hdl:2027.42/71103. ISSN 0021-8979.
- Chung, D.; Hogan, Tim; Brazis, Paul; Rocci-Lane, Melissa; Kannewurf, Carl; Bastea, Marina; Uher, Citrad; Kanatzidis, Mercouri G. (2000-02-11). "CsBi_{4}Te_{6}: A High-Performance Thermoelectric Material for Low-Temperature Applications". Science. 287 (5455). American Association for the Advancement of Science (AAAS): 1024–1027. Bibcode:2000Sci...287.1024C. doi:10.1126/science.287.5455.1024. ISSN 0036-8075. PMID 10669411.
- Uher, Ctirad; Yang, Jihui; Hu, Siqing (1998). "Materials With Open Crystal Structure as Prospective Novel Thermoelectrics". MRS Proceedings. 545. Cambridge University Press (CUP): 247–258. doi:10.1557/proc-545-247. ISSN 0272-9172.
- Meisner, G. P.; Morelli, D. T.; Hu, S.; Yang, J.; Uher, C. (1998-04-20). "Structure and Lattice Thermal Conductivity of Fractionally Filled Skutterudites: Solid Solutions of Fully Filled and Unfilled End Members". Physical Review Letters. 80 (16). American Physical Society (APS): 3551–3554. Bibcode:1998PhRvL..80.3551M. doi:10.1103/physrevlett.80.3551. ISSN 0031-9007.
- Morelli, Donald T.; Meisner, Gregory P.; Chen, Baoxing; Hu, Siqing; Uher, Ctirad (1997-09-15). "Cerium filling and doping of cobalt triantimonide". Physical Review B. 56 (12). American Physical Society (APS): 7376–7383. Bibcode:1997PhRvB..56.7376M. doi:10.1103/physrevb.56.7376. ISSN 0163-1829.
- Tsui, Frank; Chen, Baoxing; Wellman, Joanne; Uher, Ctirad; Clarke, Roy (1997-04-15). "Heat conduction of (111) Co/Cu superlattices". Journal of Applied Physics. 81 (8). AIP Publishing: 4586–4588. Bibcode:1997JAP....81.4586T. doi:10.1063/1.365170. hdl:2027.42/70031. ISSN 0021-8979.
- Uher, Ctirad (1992). "Thermal Conductivity of High-Temperature Superconductors". Physical Properties of High Temperature Superconductors. Vol. III. World Scientific. pp. 159–283. doi:10.1142/9789814439688_0003. ISBN 978-981-02-0874-5.

== Books ==
Thermal conductivity 25 : thermal expansion 13 : joint conferences, June 13–16, 1999, Ann Arbor, Michigan, USA / Ctirad Uher, editor of proceedings; Donald Morelli, co-editor of proceedings; conference host, University of Michigan, Ann Arbor, Michigan, USA. Lancaster, Pa. : Technomic Pub. Co., [c2000] xiv, 391 p. : ill.; 24 cm. ISBN 1-56676-806-3
