= Slaviša =

- Gender: male

Origin
- Origin: Slavic
- Meaning: slava ("glory, fame")

Slaviša (Cyrillic: Славиша) is a South Slavic masculine given name, an old Slavic origin given name derived from word "slav" - glory.

This name may refer to:

- Slaviša Čula, Serbian football player
- Slaviša Dugić, Swiss football player
- Slaviša Đurković, Montenegrin footballer
- Slaviša Dvorančič, Slovenian football player
- Slaviša Jokanović, Serbian football player
- Slaviša Koprivica, Serbian basketball player
- Slaviša Mitrović, Bosnian football player
- Slaviša Stojanović, Serbian football player
- Slaviša Vukićević, Bosnian football player
- Slaviša Žungul, Yugoslavian-American football player
