= Velimir Milošević =

Bosnian writer, poet, and editor

Velimir Milošević (1937–2004) was a Montenegrin Serb writer, poet, and editor.
