= Ivan Bratko =

Ivan Bratko may refer to:

- Ivan Bratko (computer scientist) (born 1946), Slovene computer scientist and educator
- Ivan Bratko (publisher) (1914–2001), Slovene partisan, officer and writer
