= Jasna Popović =

Serbian pianist

Jasna Popović (Serbian Cyrillic: Јасна Поповић) is a Serbian pianist residing in New York City.

== Personal life ==
Popović was born in Belgrade, where she received her first piano lesson at six years of age. Upon graduating from the music high school in 1997, she moved to Munich, where she attended the Hochschule für Musik und Theater and studied under the guidance of Gitti Pirner and Claude-France Journes. After performing in New York City, Popović decided to remain living there. She is currently working on her solo album, which will primarily feature classical Serbian music.

== Notable achievements ==
Popović has won several awards, including second place at the National Piano Competition in Belgrade, fourth place at the International Competition in Rome. In 2005, she was invited to play at the International Keyboard Festival in New York City, and subsequently decided to stay in New York. In 2006, Popović received the Passantino Award for Special Achievements from City University of New York and the following year she performed at Steinway Hall and Lefrack Hall, Carnegie Hall in New York, and Kolarac Hall in Belgrade. She has worked with several artists such as composer Rodion Shchedrin, pianist Vadim Suhanov, and double-bassist Roman Patkolo among others.

=== Organizations ===
Popović is a co-founder of a new organization for the benefit of not only Serbian artists, but all artists interested in international exchange of culture. She has made recordings of ethno-classical Serbian music honoring Queen Elizabeth.
