= Jasna Gabrič =

Slovene politician (born 1985)

Jasna Gabrič (born 25 June 1985) was the mayor of Trbovlje, Slovenia, from 2014 to 2022 and was the first vice-president of Renew Europe in the European Committee of the Regions until January 2025.

== Career ==
During her studies, she worked at radio stations Radio Glas Ljubljane, Radio Trbovlje, and Radio Aktual. With the support of radio listeners, she successfully ran for membership in the municipal council in 2010. In the second half of her term, she was appointed deputy mayor.

In 2014, she won the mayoral elections as an independent candidate with her team, becoming the youngest mayor in Slovenia. She ran for re-election in 2018, receiving a convincing 67.03% of the votes in the first round.

In 2022, she announced that she would not run for re-election. Same year, on the 30th anniversary of the association, she became the president of the Association of Municipalities of Slovenia, the first woman in the history of the association.
