= Jezdimir =

Jezdimir (Serbian Cyrillic: Јездимир) is a Serbian given name. It is composed of two words: jezditi (to ride) and mir (peace, or in other contexts the world). It may refer to:

- Jezdimir Dangić (1897–1947), Bosnian Serb Chetnik commander
- Jezdimir Bogdanski (1930–2007), Yugoslav Partisan
- Jezdimir Vasiljević (born 1948), controversial businessman, pyramid-schemer

== See also ==
- Jezdimirović, surname
- Jezdić, surname
