= Zdravkov =

Zdravkov (Bulgarian: Здравков) is a surname. Notable people with the surname include:

- Antoni Zdravkov (born 1964), Bulgarian footballer
- Gordan Zdravkov (born 1959), Macedonian footballer
- Toma Zdravkov (born 1987), Bulgarian singer
- Radoslav Zdravkov (1956), Bulgarian footballer
- Zdravko Zdravkov (born 1970), Bulgarian footballer

== See also ==
- Georgi Zdravkov Sarmov (born 1985), Bulgarian footballer
