= Vlastimil =

Vlastimil is a Czech masculine given name. It originates from the roots vlast ('homeland') and mil ('favour').

The feminine counterpart is Vlastimila. The name day is on 13 March (Slovakia) and 17 March (Czech Republic). A related name is Vlastislav. Short forms of the name include Vlasta and Míla.

Notable people with the name include:

== Sports ==
- Vlastimil Babula (born 1973), Czech chess player
- Vlastimil Bubník (1931–2015), Czech ice hockey player and footballer
- Vlastimil Černý (born 1963), Czech-Canadian swimmer
- Vlastimil Daníček (born 1991), Czech footballer
- Vlastimil Havlík (born 1957), Czech basketball player and coach
- Vlastimil Hoferek (born 1946), Czech athlete
- Vlastimil Hort (1944–2025), Czech-German chess player
- Vlastimil Hrubý (born 1985), Czech footballer
- Vlastimil Jansa (born 1942), Czech chess player
- Vlastimil Kopecký (1912–1967), Czech footballer
- Vlastimil Lada-Sázavský (1886–1956), Czech fencer
- Vlastimil Mařinec (born 1957), Czech athlete
- Vlastimil Palička (born 1954), Czech football player and manager
- Vlastimil Petržela (born 1953), Czech football player and manager
- Vlastimil Stožický (born 1983), Czech footballer
- Vlastimil Vidlička (born 1981), Czech footballer

== Other ==
- Vlastimil Balín (born 1950), Czech politician
- Vlastimil Brodský (1920–2002), Czech actor
- Vlasta Burian, born Josef Vlastimil Burian (1891–1962), Czech actor
- Vlastimil Harapes (1946–2024), Czech dancer, choreographer and actor
- Wlastimil Hofman, born Vlastimil Hofman (1881–1970), Polish-Czech painter
- Vlastimil Horváth (born 1977), Czech singer
- Vlastimil Košvanec (1887–1961), Czech painter
- Vlastimil Koubek (1927–2003), Czech-American architect
- Vlastimil Kročil (born 1961), Czech Roman Catholic bishop
- Vlastimil Lejsek (1927–2010), Czech pianist and composer
- Vlastimil Picek (born 1956), Czech politician and military leader
- Vlastimil Pták (1925–1999), Czech mathematician
- Vlastimil Třešňák (born 1950), Czech singer and songwriter
- Vlastimil Tusar (1880–1924), Czech journalist and politician
- Vlastimil Válek (born 1960), Czech politician and radiologist
- Vlastimil Zábranský (1936–2021), Czech visual artist
