= Godzimir =

- Gender: male

Origin
- Origin: Slavic
- Meaning: godzi/gode ("appropriate") + mir ("peace, world, prestige")

Other names
- Alternative spelling: Godemir
- Variant forms: Godemira, Godzimira
- Nicknames: Mirko, Mira
- Related names: Mirogod

Godzimir or Godemir - is a very old Slavic given name meaning: godzi/gode - "to do something at appropriate time", mir - "peace, world, prestige". Feminine form: Godzimira/Godemira. Alternate form of this name is: Mirogod.

The name may refer to:

- Godzimir Małachowski (1852-1908) - a Polish lawyer, university professor and President of Lviv
- Godemir - ban of Croatia, ca. AD 1000

== See also ==
- Slavic names
