= Veselinovac =

- Village (Selo)
- Location within Serbia
- Coordinates: 44°18′N 20°04′E
- Country: Serbia
- District: Kolubara District
- Municipality: Valjevo

Population (2002)
  - Total: 240
- Time zone: UTC+1 (CET)
  - Summer (DST): UTC+2 (CEST)

Veselinovac is a village in the municipality of Valjevo, Serbia. According to the 2002 census, the village has a population of 240 people.

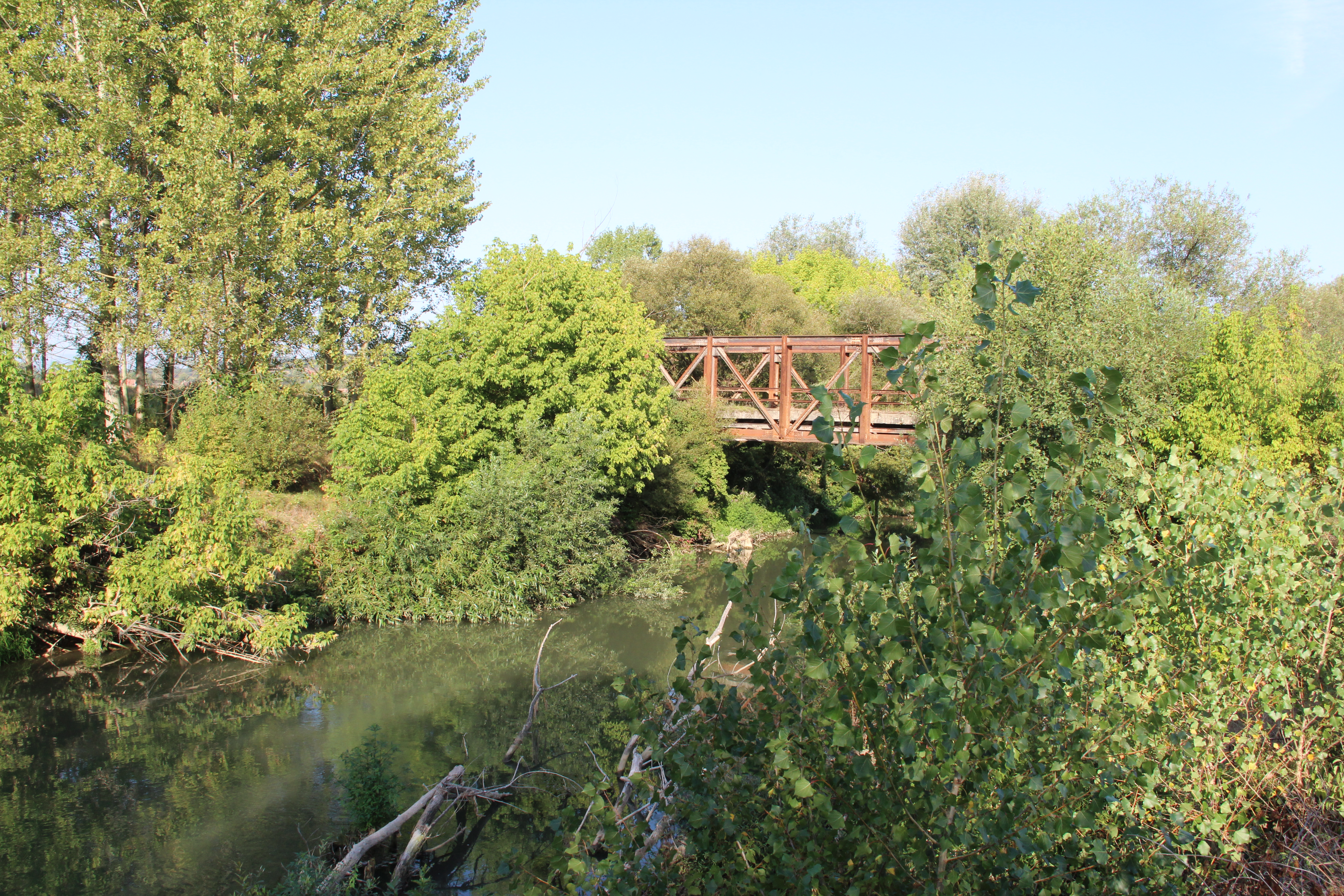
Veselinovac - Bridge in the river Kolubara

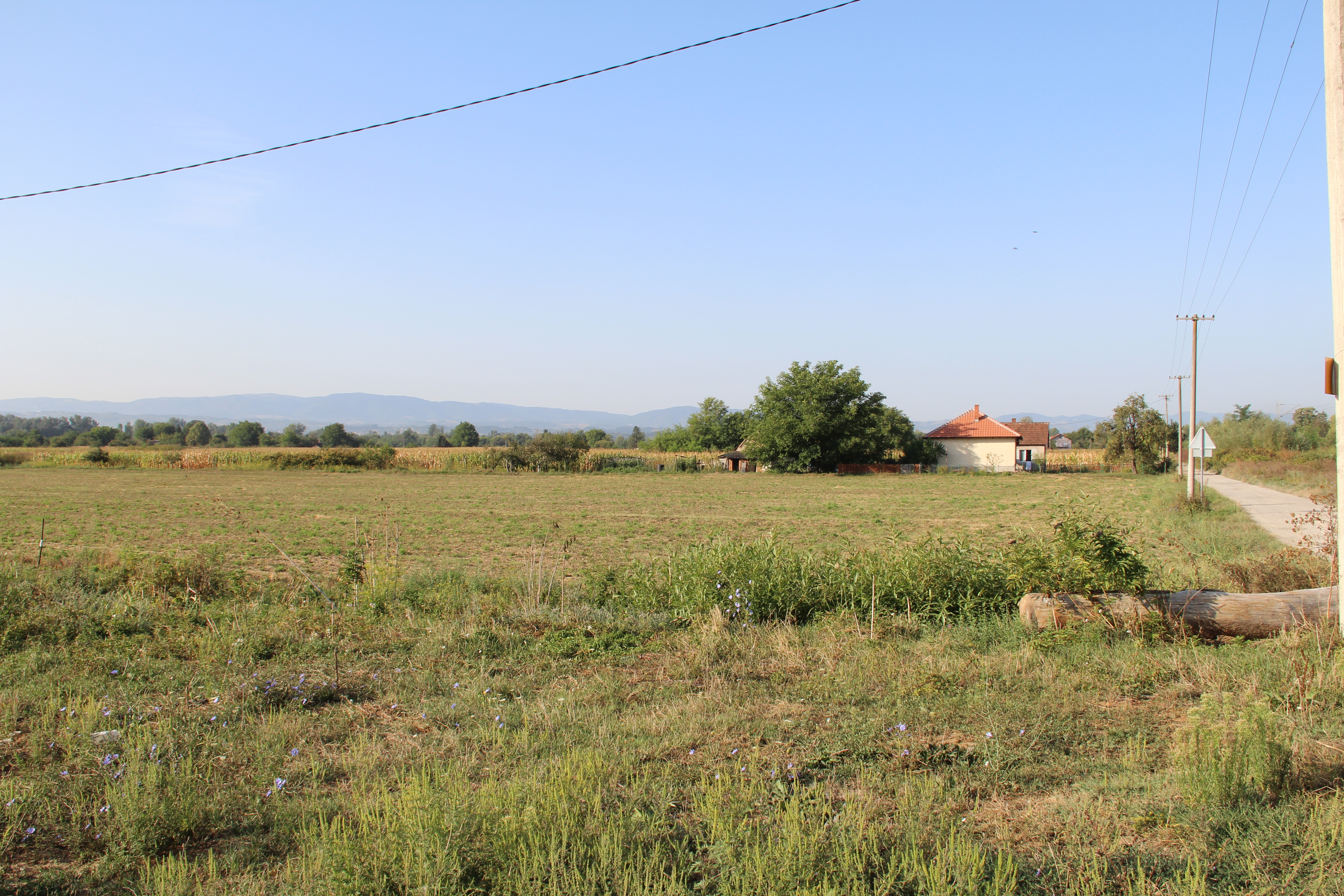
Veselinovac - Panorama

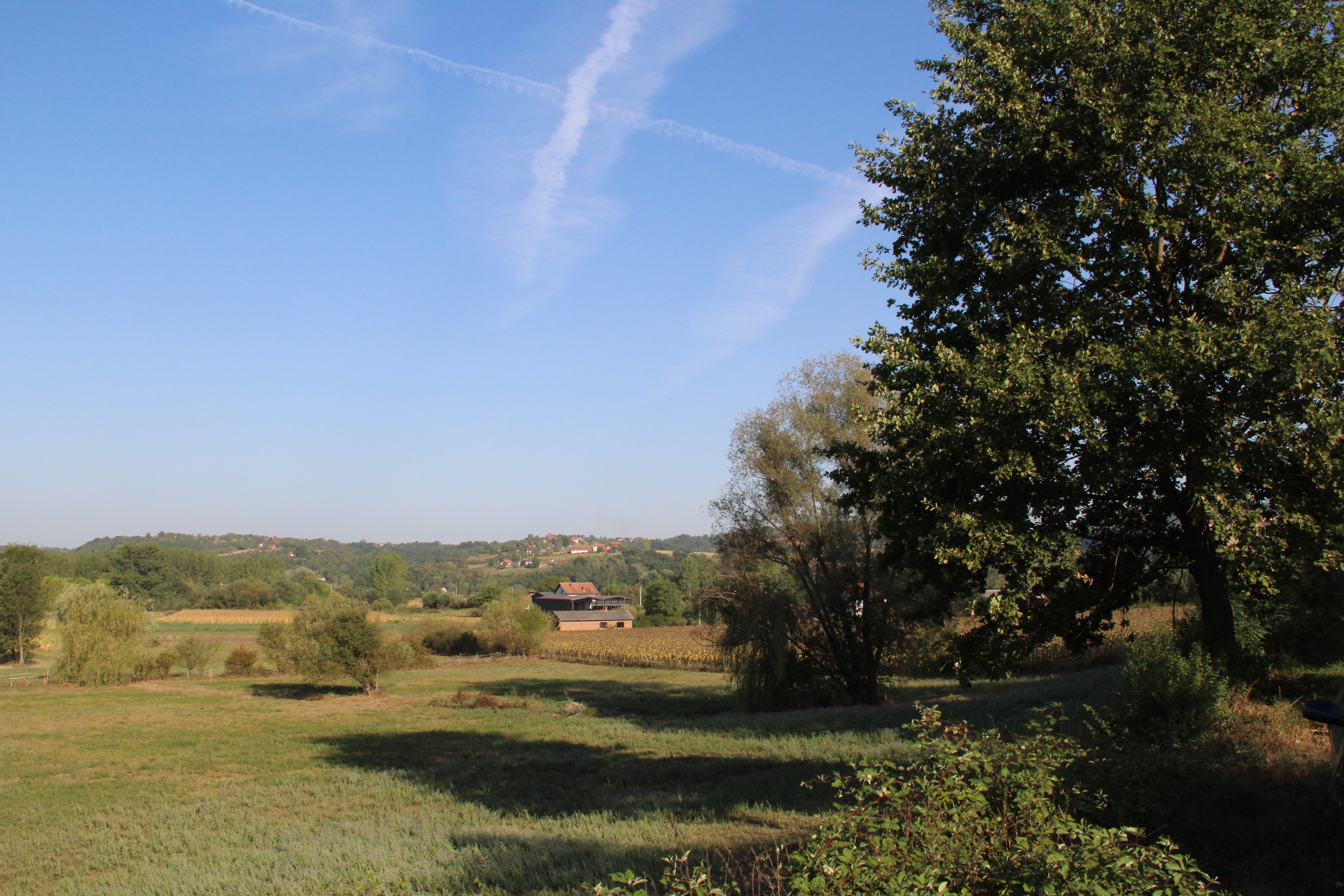
Veselinovac - Panorama

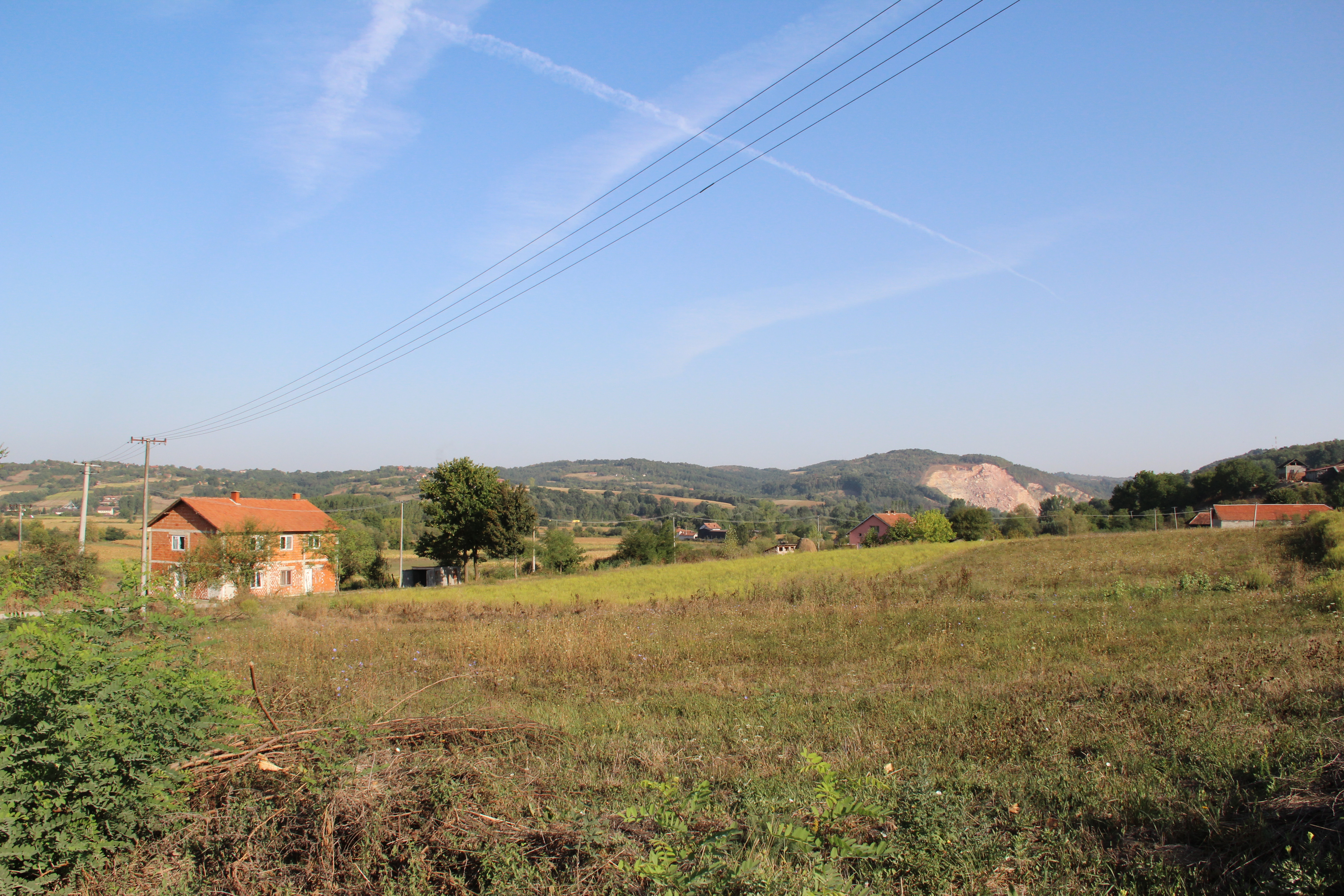
Veselinovac - Panorama

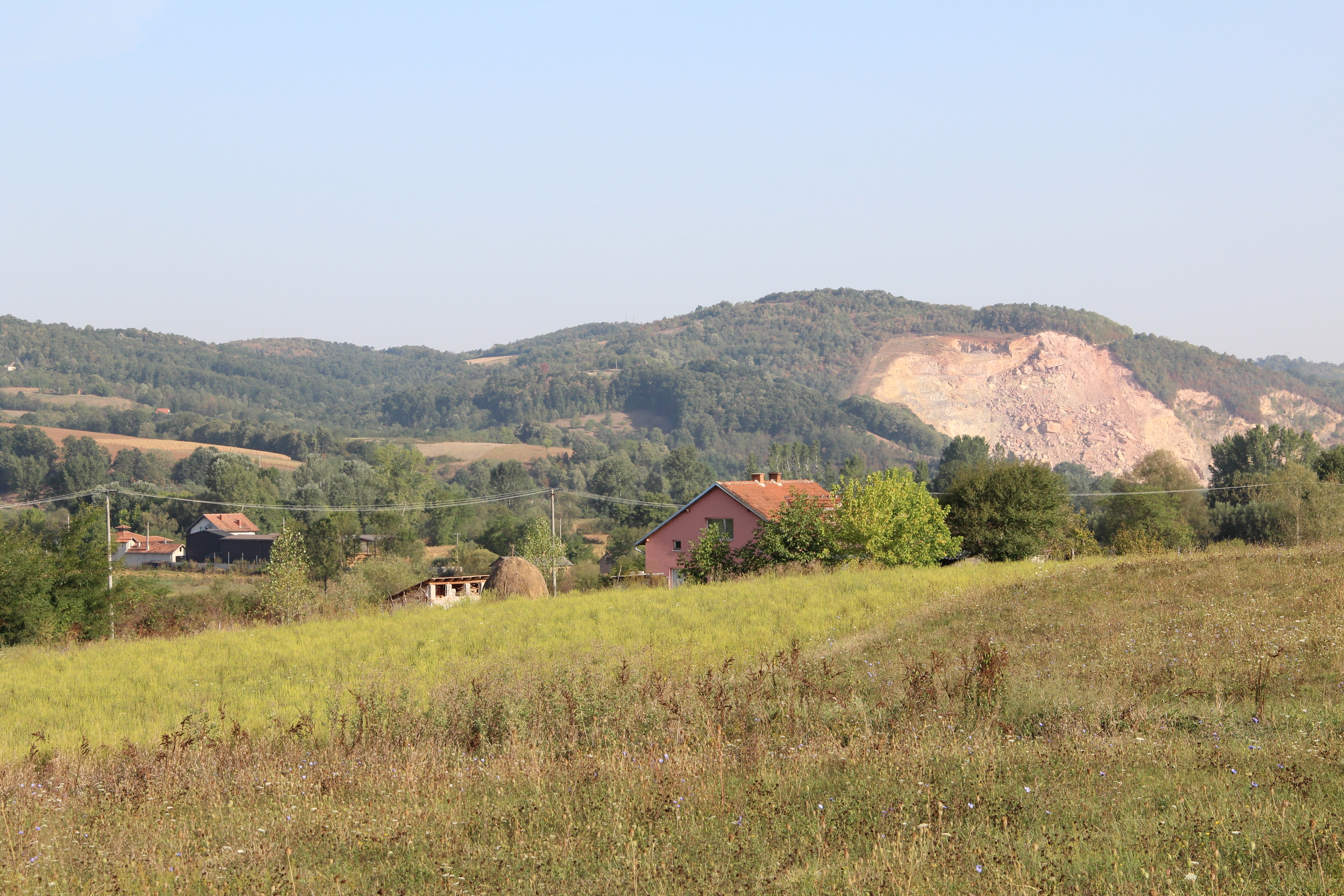
Veselinovac - Panorama

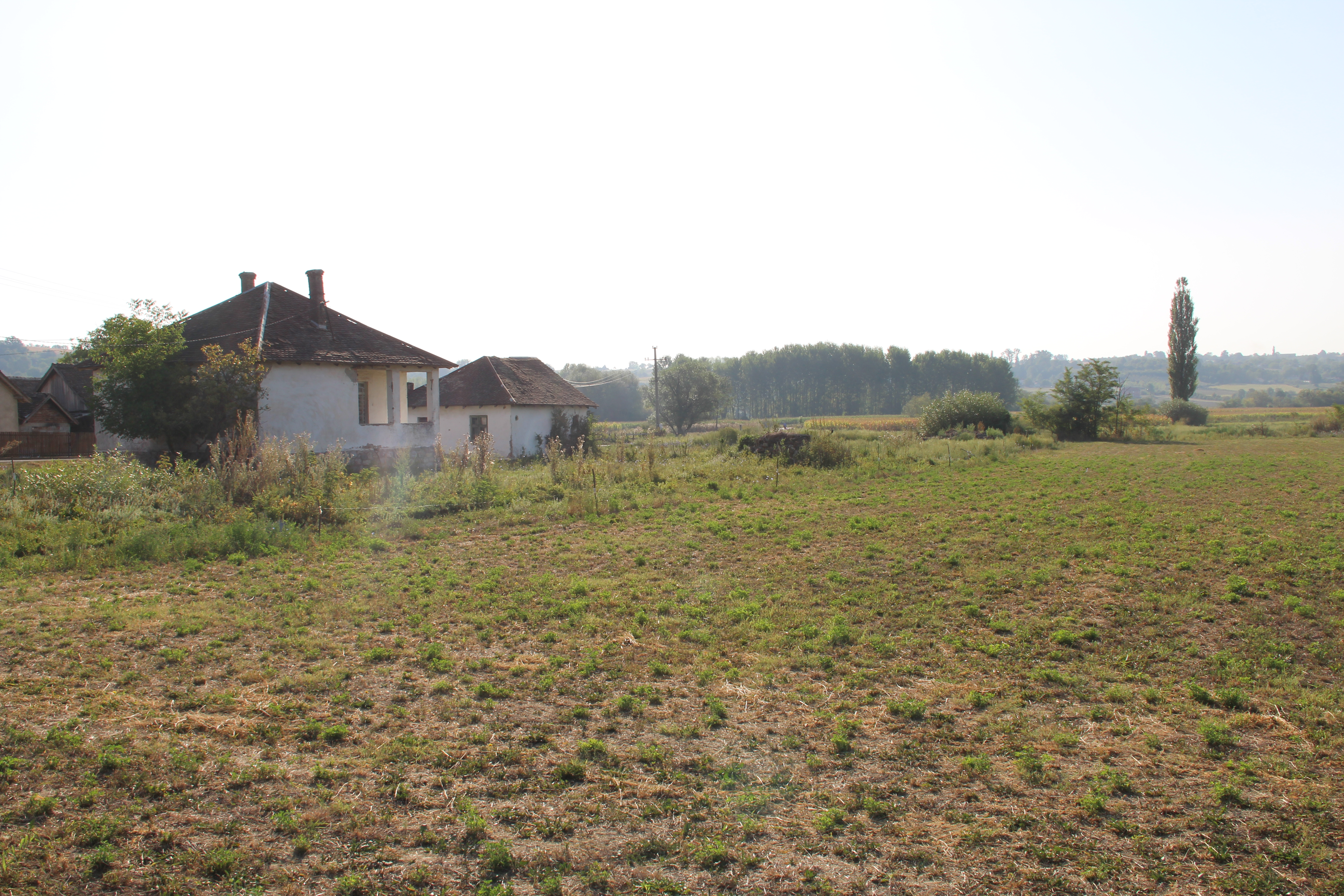
Veselinovac - Panorama

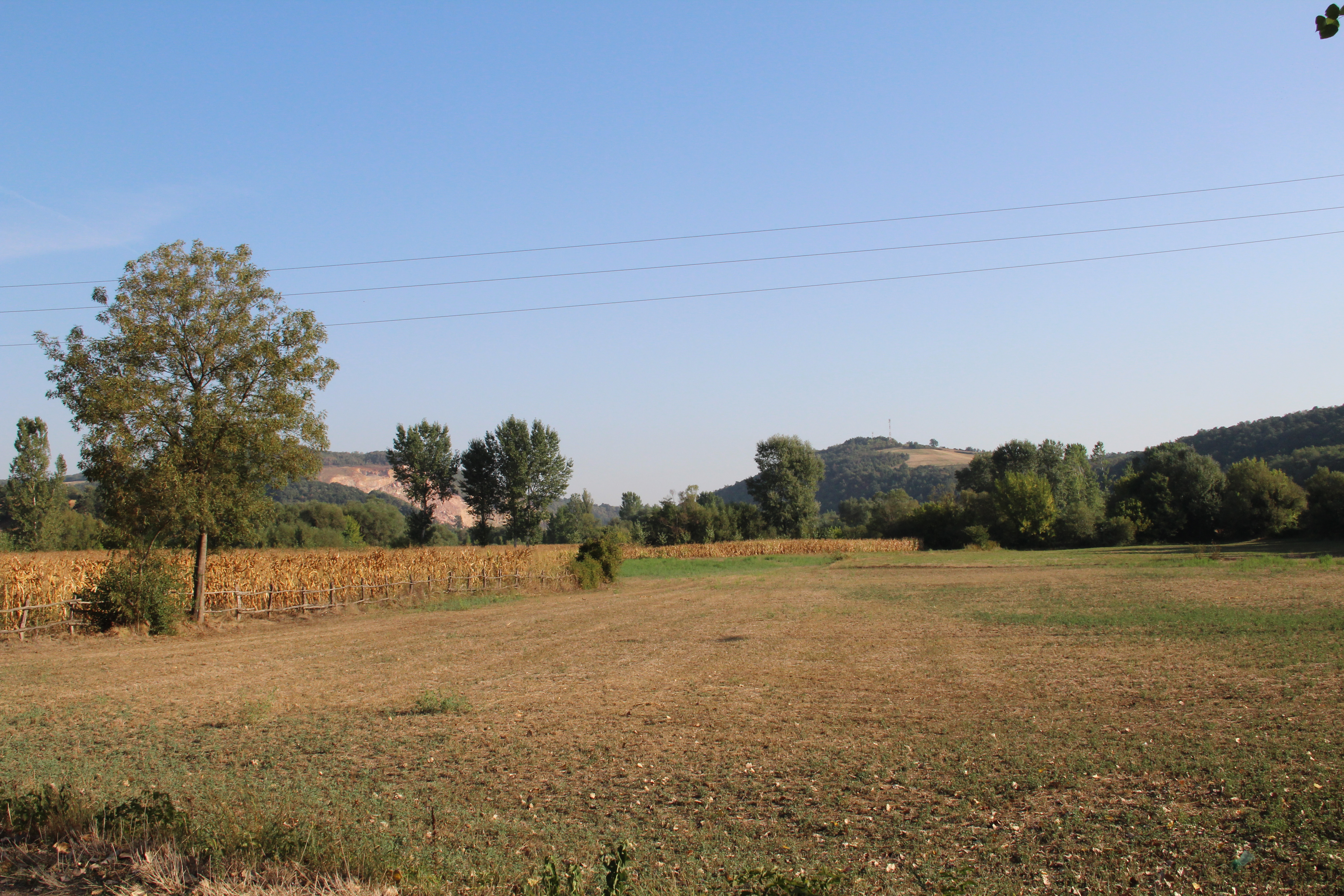
Veselinovac - Panorama
