= Nicholas Bratko =

Father Nicholas Bratko (Ukrainian: Mikola Bratko; 1896, in Kherson Oblast, Russian Empire – 3 April 1958, in Lyon, France) was a Greek-Catholic priest.

== Biography ==
Father Bratko was born in 1896 in a Cossack village near Kherson. He was Orthodox due to his Cossack origin, graduated from the classical school and took part in World War I and the Russian Civil War on the side of White movement. Later he emigrated to Constantinople, where he moved into France. He studied science at the University of Lyon, attended lectures on philosophy and theology. In 1922 Bratko joined to the Catholic Church. He studied at the Greek College of Saint Athanasius in Rome, where he graduated in 1927 with a doctorate degree. In the same year he was ordained a priest of the Byzantine rite. Served as secretary of Bishop Michel d'Herbigny, after the resignation of which he was appointed rector of the Ukrainian Greek Catholic parish of Lyon. He also served as chaplain of a Catholic monastic community of sisters. Father Nicholas Bratko died on 3 April 1958 in Lyon.
