= Dobroniega =

- Gender: female

Origin
- Origin: Slavic
- Meaning: dobro ("good, goodness") + niega ("delight")

Dobroniega is a Slavic name which contains word "dobro" - good, goodness and "niega" - delight, and may refer to:

- Dobroniega of Poland - a Polish princess member of the House of Piast and by marriage Margravine of Lusatia.
- Maria Dobroniega of Kiev - a Slavic princess member of the Rurikid dynasty

== See also ==
- Polish name
- Slavic names
