= Veselinov =

Veselinov (Bulgarian: Веселинов) is a Slavic surname. Notable people with the surname include:

- Dragan Veselinov, Serbian politician
- Georgi Veselinov – Zograf (1843–1886), Bulgarian painter and politician
- Jovan Veselinov, Serbian communist politician
- Nikolay Veselinov Hristov (born 1989), Bulgarian footballer
- Tsvetan Veselinov (1947–2018), Bulgarian footballer
- Valentin Veselinov (born 1992), Bulgarian footballer
- Vladimir Veselinov (born 1984), Serbian footballer
