= Chwalibogowo, Września County =

Chwalibogowo
- Village
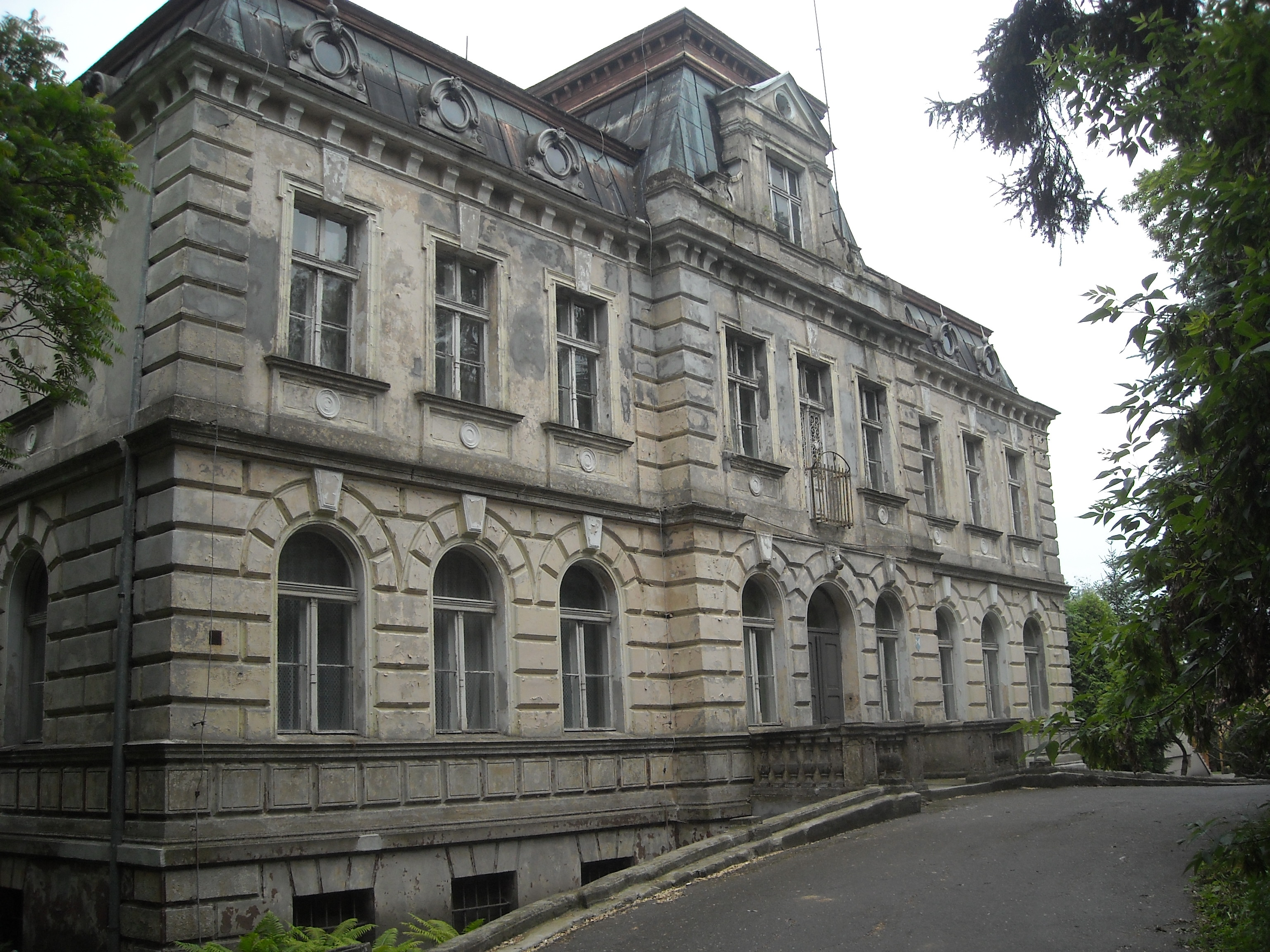
- Chwalibogowo Palace

- Location within Poland
- Coordinates: 52°15′N 17°47′E
- Country: Poland
- Voivodeship: Greater Poland
- County: Września
- Gmina: Września
- Time zone: UTC+1 (CET)
  - Summer (DST): UTC+2 (CEST)

Chwalibogowo [xfalibɔˈɡɔvɔ] (German 1939-1945 Dietrichsfelde) is a village in the administrative district of Gmina Września, within Września County, Greater Poland Voivodeship, in west-central Poland.

The oldest known mention of the village comes from 1335. Chwalibogowo was a private village, owned by various Polish nobles. In the 19th century most of the populace adhered to the Catholic Church, with small Protestant and Jewish minorities. The last pre-war owner of the local palace was Polish Colonel Aleksander Zygmunt Myszkowski. During the German occupation (World War II), many inhabitants were killed in battles, and in 1942 one Polish resident was executed and eight were deported to forced labour camps for helping Russian soldiers, who were prisoners of war according to German sources.

The Chwalibogowo Palace is the main landmark of the village. There is also a train stop, an elementary school and a culture centre in the village.
