= Duško =

Duško (Serbian: Душко) is a Slavic masculine given name, often a diminutive for Dušan.

Notable people with the name include:

- Duško Adamović (born 1973), Serbian footballer
- Duško Ajder (born 1958), Serbian footballer
- Duško Antunović (1947–2012), Croatian water polo player and coach
- Duško Ćurlić (born 1968), Croatian actor and radio and television host
- Duško Devčić (born 1948), Croatian football player
- Duško Doder (1937–2024), American journalist of Bosnian origin
- Duško Đorđević, Serbian rower
- Duško Đurišić (born 1977), Montenegrin football player
- Duško Gojković (1931–2023), Serbian jazz trumpeter and composer
- Duško Ivanović (born 1957), Montenegrin basketball coach and player
- Duško Mrduljaš (born 1951), Croatian rower and businessman
- Duško Pavasovič (born 1976), Slovenian chess player and grandmaster
- Duško Pijetlović (born 1985), Serbian water polo player
- Duško Popov (1912–1981), Serbian double agent
- Duško Radinović (born 1963), Montenegrin association footballer
- Duško Savić (born 1968), Bosnian Serb association footballer
- Duško Sikirica (born 1964), Bosnian Serb convicted for war crimes
- Duško Stajić (born 1982), Serbian footballer
- Duško Tadić (born 1955), Bosnian Serb convicted for war crimes
- Duško Tošić (born 1985), Serbian football player
- Duško Trifunović (1933–2006), Serbian poet and writer
- Duško Vujošević (1959–2026), Serbian and Montenegrin basketball coach
