= Vlastislav (given name) =

Vlastislav is a Czech masculine given name. It originates from the roots vlast ('homeland') and sláva ('glory'). The feminine counterpart is Vlastislava. Notable people with the name include:

- Vlastislav Antolák (1942–2023), Czech teacher and politician
- Vlastislav Hofman (1884–1964), Czech architect, painter and graphic
- Vlastislav Mareček (1966–2007), Czech football manager

== See also ==
- Vlastislav (mythological prince), Slavic mythological prince
