= Niemirów =

Niemirów may refer to the following places:

- Niemirów, Biłgoraj County in Lublin Voivodeship (east Poland)
- Niemirów, Chełm County in Lublin Voivodeship (east Poland)
- Niemirów, Podlaskie Voivodeship (north-east Poland)
- former name of Nemyriv in Ukraine
