= Zbigniew =

- Pronunciation: Polish pronunciation: [ˈzbiɡɲɛf]
- Gender: Male

Origin
- Origin: Polish
- Meaning: To dispel anger
- Region of origin: Poland

Other names
- Related names: Zbyhněv, Zbyněk

Zbigniew (Polish pronunciation: [ˈzbiɡɲɛf]) is a Polish masculine given name, originally Zbygniew [ˈzbɨɡɲɛf]. This West Slavic name is derived from the Polish elements Zby- (from zbyć, zbyć się, or pozbyć się, meaning "to dispel", "to get rid of") and gniew, meaning "anger". The Czech form of this name is Zbyněk (derived from Zbyhněv).

English diminutives of this name are Zibi, Zbiggy or Zbig.

== Notable people ==
- Zbigniew of Brzezia (c. 1360 – c. 1425), Polish knight and nobleman of Clan Zadora
- Zbigniew of Poland, high duke of Poland from 1102–1106

=== A ===
- Zbigniew Andruszkiewicz (born 1959), Polish rower

=== B ===
- Zbigniew Babiński (1896–1940), Polish military and sports aviator
- Zbigniew Bargielski (born 1937), Polish composer
- Zbigniew Baranowski (born 1991), Polish wrestler
- Zbigniew Bartman (born 1987), Polish volleyball player
- Zbigniew Beta (born 1953), Polish long jumper
- Zbigniew Bieńkowski (1913–1994), Polish poet, literary critic, translator and essayist
- Zbigniew Boniek (born 1956), Polish footballer, manager, and President of the Polish Football Association
- Zbigniew Brym (1919–2006), Polish military, photographer and publicist
- Zbigniew Bródka (born 1984), Polish speed skater, 2014 Olympic champion in 1500 metres
- Zbigniew Brzeziński (1928–2017), Polish-American diplomat and political scientist
- Zbigniew Buczkowski (born 1951), Polish film actor and entertainer
- Zbigniew Bujak (born 1954), opposition activist in the People's Republic of Poland
- Zbigniew Bujarski (1933–2018), Polish composer
- Zbigniew Burzyński (1902–1971), Polish balloonist and constructor of balloons
- Zbigniew Bzymek (born 1976), Polish-American filmmaker, experimental theatre and music video artist

=== C ===
- Zbigniew Chlebowski (born 1964), Polish politician
- Zbigniew Chmielowiec (born 1954), Polish politician, Member of Parliament
- Zbigniew Ciesielski (1934–2020), Polish mathematician
- Zbigniew Cybulski (1927–1967), Polish actor
- Zbigniew Ćwiąkalski (born 1950), Polish politician
- Zbigniew Czaja, Polish slalom canoeist
- Zbigniew Czajkowski (1921–2019), Polish fencing coach
- Zbigniew Czerwiński (speedway rider) (born 1982), Polish speedway rider

=== D ===
- Zbigniew Dębski (1922–2010), Polish military personnel and co-founder of the Union of Warsaw Insurgents
- Zbigniew Deptuła (born 1962), Polish politician from the Polish People's Party
- Zbigniew Dłubak (1921–2005), Polish painter
- Zbigniew Doda (1931–2013), Polish chess player
- Zbigniew Dolata (born 1965), Polish politician, Member of Parliament
- Zbigniew Dregier (born 1935), Polish basketball player
- Zbigniew Drzewiecki (1890–1971), Polish pianist and music educator
- Zbigniew Dunin-Wasowicz (1882–1915), Polish military leader
- Zbigniew Dybol (born 1947), Polish handball player

=== E ===
- Zbigniew Eysmont (1949–2005), Polish politician, artist, and restauranteur

=== F ===
- Zbigniew Fedyczak (born 1952), Polish sports shooter
- Zbigniew Fil (born 1977), Polish singer and multi-instrumentalist
- Zbigniew Firlej (c. 1613–1649), noble of the Polish-Lithuanian Commonwealth
- Zbigniew Antoni Fronczek (born 1935), Polish politician

=== G ===
- Zbigniew Gawlik (born 1956), Polish handball player
- Zbigniew Gawlor (1946–2003), Polish luger
- Zbigniew Girzyński (born 1973), Member of Parliament
- Zbigniew Gołąb (1923–1994), Polish linguist and Slavist
- Zbigniew Grzybowski (born 1976), Polish football winger
- Zbigniew Gut (1949–2010), Polish football defender

=== H ===
- Zbigniew Herbert (1924–1998), Polish poet, essayist, drama writer and moralist
- Zbigniew Herman (1935–2010), Polish physician and pharmacologist
- Zbigniew Hoffmann (born 1963), Polish politician

=== J ===
- Zbigniew Jagiełło (born 1964), Polish banker
- Zbigniew Janiszewski (born 1931), Polish pole vaulter
- Zbigniew Jankowski (1931–2024), Polish poet and essayist
- Zbigniew Januszkiewicz (born 1962), Polish swimmer
- Zbigniew Jaremski (1949–2011), Polish sprinter
- Zbigniew Jaworowski (1927–2011) Polish physician and alpinist
- Zbigniew Juszczak (field hockey, born 1975) (born 1975), Polish field hockey player

=== K ===
- Zbigniew Kabata (1924–2014), Polish parasitologist, World War II veteran, poet, fisherman, translator and scientific administrator
- Zbigniew Kaczmarek (disambiguation), multiple people, including:
  - Zbigniew Kaczmarek (weightlifter) (1946–2023), Polish weightlifter, Olympic medalist
  - Zbigniew Kaczmarek (footballer) (born 1962), Polish football player
- Zbigniew Karkowski (1958–2013), Polish composer and musician
- Zbigniew Karpus (born 1954), Polish historian
- Zbigniew Kiernikowski (born 1946), Polish Roman Catholic priest, professor
- Zbigniew Komorowski, Polish figure skater
- Zbigniew Kowalski (born 1970), Polish football defender
- Zbigniew Kozak (born 1961), Polish politician, Member of Parliament
- Zbigniew Kruszyński (born 1960), Polish football player
- Zbigniew Kupczynski (born 1928), Polish-Canadian abstract expressionist artist
- Zbigniew Kuźmiński (1921–2005), Polish film director and screenwriter
- Zbigniew Kuźmiuk (born 1956), Polish politician
- Zbigniew Kwiatkowski (born 1985), Polish handball player

=== L ===
- Zbigniew Lengren (1919–2003), Polish cartoonist, caricaturist, and illustrator
- Zbigniew Leśniak (born 1950), Polish slalom canoeist
- Zbigniew Lew-Starowicz (born 1943), Polish psychiatrist and psychotherapist
- Zbigniew Libera (born 1959), Polish artist
- Zbigniew J. Lipowski (1924–1997), Polish psychiatrist, historian, author, political commentator and speaker
- Zbigniew Lubiejewski (born 1949), Polish volleyball player

=== M ===
- Zbigniew Marciniak (born 1952), Polish mathematician and university teacher
- Zbigniew Makomaski (born 1931), Polish middle-distance runner
- Zbigniew Makowski (1930–2019), Polish painter
- Zbigniew Małkowski (born 1978), Polish football goalkeeper
- Zbigniew Matwiejew (born 1949), Polish fencer
- Zbigniew Messner (1929–2014), Polish politician and economist
- Zbigniew Miązek (born 1966), Polish slalom canoer
- Zbigniew Michalewicz, Polish entrepreneur, author and professor
- Zbigniew Morsztyn (c. 1628–1689), Polish poet

=== N ===
- Zbigniew Namysłowski (1939–2022), Polish jazz composer
- Zbigniew Nienacki (1929–1994), Polish writer
- Zbigniew Nieradka, Polish glider pilot
- Zbigniew Niewiadomski (born 1946), Polish sprint canoer
- Zbigniew Niszczot (born 1955), Australian rugby league player
- Zbigniew Nowosadzki (born 1957), Polish painter

=== O ===
- Zbigniew Okoński (born 1949), Polish politician and businessman
- Zbigniew Oleśnicki (disambiguation), multiple people, including:
  - Zbigniew Oleśnicki (cardinal) (1389–1455), Roman Catholic clergyman and a Polish statesman and diplomat
  - Zbigniew Oleśnicki (primate of Poland) (c. 1430–1493), Roman Catholic clergyman and Polish politician
- Zbigniew Orywał (born 1930), Polish middle-distance runner

=== P ===
- Zbigniew Pacelt (1951–2021), Polish politician and athlete
- Zbigniew Pakleza (born 1986), Polish chess Grandmaster
- Zbigniew Paleta (born 1942), Polish violinist and composer for telenovelas
- Zbigniew Paradowski (born 1932), Polish rower
- Zbigniew Pełczyński (1925–2021), Polish-British political philosopher and academic
- Zbigniew Piątek (born 1966), Polish road racing cyclist
- Zbigniew Pierzynka, Polish long-distance runner
- Zbigniew Pietrzykowski (1934–2014), Polish boxer, Olympian
- Zbigniew Piórkowski (1929–1994), Polish boxer, Olympian
- Zbigniew Podraza (born 1953) Polish politician, member of Parliament and mayor of Dąbrowa Górnicza
- Zbigniew Preisner (born 1955), Polish film score composer
- Zbigniew Promiński (born 1978), nicknamed "Inferno", Polish death metal drummer
- Zbigniew Przybyszewski (1907–1952), Polish military officer and a Commander in the Polish Navy

=== R ===
- Zbigniew Radziwonowicz (1930–2002), Polish athlete in the javelin throw
- Zbigniew Raszewski (1925–1992), Polish writer and theatre historian
- Zbigniew Religa (1938–2009), Polish cardiac surgeon and politician
- Zbigniew Rokita, Polish writer
- Zbigniew Romaszewski (1940–2014), Polish conservative politician, senator, and human rights activist
- Zbigniew Rybczyński (born 1949), Polish filmmaker, director, cinematographer, and screenwriter
- Zbigniew Rychlicki (1922–1989), Polish graphic artist and illustrator of children's books
- Zbigniew Rynasiewicz (born 1963), Polish politician

=== S ===
- Zbigniew Sawan (1904–1984), Polish stage and film actor
- Zbigniew Schodowski (born 1987), Polish rower
- Zbigniew Schwarzer (1928–2008), Polish rower
- Zbigniew Ścibor-Rylski (1917–2018), Polish aviator, officer of the Home Army, Brigadier General of the Polish Army
- Zbigniew Seifert (1946–1979), Polish jazz musician
- Zbigniew Siemiątkowski (born 1957), Polish politician
- Zbigniew Skowroński (1925–1992), Polish bobsledder
- Zbigniew Skrudlik (born 1934), Polish fencer
- Zbigniew Ślusarski (born 1947), Polish rower
- Zbigniew Sosnowski (born 1963), Polish politician, Member of Parliament
- Zbigniew Spruch (born 1965), Polish cyclist
- Zbigniew Stonoga (born 1974), Polish entrepreneur, videobloger, social and political activist
- Zbigniew Stryj (born 1968), Polish actor
- Zbigniew Stypułkowski (1904–1979), Polish lawyer and politician
- Zbigniew Suchecki (born 1984), Polish speedway rider
- Zbigniew Suszyński (born 1961), Polish film, television and theater actor
- Zbigniew Syka (1936–1996), Polish sprinter
- Zbigniew Szafrański, Polish Egyptologist
- Zbigniew Szczepkowski (1952–2019), Polish cyclist
- Zbigniew Szewczyk (born 1967), Polish football player and coach
- Zbigniew Szydlo (born 1949), English chemist, academic and teacher
- Zbigniew Szymczak (1952–2019), Polish chess player

=== T ===
- Zbigniew Tęczyński (c. 1450–1498), Polish nobleman
- Zbigniew Torzecki, Polish sprint canoer
- Zbigniew Tłuczyński (born 1956), Polish handball player and coach
- Zbigniew Turski (1908–1979), Polish composer

=== W ===
- Zbigniew Wachowicz (born 1972), Polish football defender
- Zbigniew Wassermann (1949–2010), minister-member of the Council of Ministers, coordinator of special services
- Zbigniew Wawer, Polish historian, specializing in Polish military history in World War II
- Zbigniew Włodkowski (born 1961), Polish politician, Member of Parliament
- Zbigniew Wodecki (1950–2017), Polish musician
- Zbigniew Wóycicki (1902–1928), Polish officer and skier
- Zbigniew Woźnicki (1958–2008), Polish cyclist
- Zbigniew Wyciszkiewicz (born 1969), Polish football midfielder

=== Z ===
- Zbigniew Zakrzewski (disambiguation), multiple people, including:
  - Zbigniew Zakrzewski (footballer) (born 1981), Polish footballer
  - Zbigniew Zakrzewski (economist) (1912–1992), Polish economist
- Zbigniew Zaleski (1947–2019), Polish politician
- Zbigniew Załuski (1926–1978), Polish army officer, writer and Member of Parliament
- Zbigniew Zamachowski (born 1961), Polish actor
- Zbigniew Zapasiewicz (1934–2009), Polish actor, theatre director, and pedagogue
- Zbigniew Żarnowiecki (born 1927), Polish rower
- Zbigniew Zarzycki (born 1948), Polish volleyball player
- Zbigniew Ziobro (born 1970), Polish politician
- Zbigniew Żedzicki (born 1945), Polish wrestler
- Zbigniew Ziembinski (born 1908), Polish-Brazilian actor, director
- Zbigniew Żupnik (1951–2000), Polish painter
- Zbigniew Zychowicz (1953–2016), Polish politician and member of the Democratic Left Alliance

== See also ==
- Zbyszko
- Polish name
- Slavic names
