= Zibi =

Zibi may refer to:

== Places ==
- Kitigan Zibi, an Algonquin First Nations reserve in Quebec, Canada
- Zibi, a mixed-use land redevelopment project in Ottawa, Ontario, Canada

== People ==
- Elizabeth Turtle (born 1967), also known as "Zibi", an American planetary scientist
- A nickname for Zbigniew:
  - Zbigniew Boniek (born 1956), a Polish former footballer and manager
  - Zbigniew Małkowski (born 1978), a Polish former footballer and coach
- Songezo Zibi (born 1975), a South African politician
