= Zbylut =

Zbylut may refer to:

== People ==
- Zbylut (given name), a Slavic male given name

== Places ==
- Zbylutów, a village in Lower Silesian Voivodeship, Poland
- Zbyluty, a settlement in Warmian-Masurian Voivodeship, Poland

== See also ==
- Zbigniew
- Zbyszko
