= Zbylut (given name) =

- Gender: male

Origin
- Origin: Slavic
- Meaning: zbyć ("to dispel") + lut ("severe")

Zbylut is an old Polish given name of Slavic origin built of two parts: zby ("to dispel, to get rid of") and lut ("severe").

== List of people with the given name Zbylut ==
- Zbylut Grzywacz, a Polish painter, sculptor, graphic artist, and professor of the Academy of Fine Arts in Kraków
- Zbylut Twardowski, a Polish-American physician, known for his pioneering work on dialysis

== See also ==
- Zbylut (disambiguation)
- Zbigniew
- Zbyszko
