= Zbigniew Zakrzewski =

Zbigniew Zakrzewski may refer to:

- Zbigniew Zakrzewski (footballer) (born 1981), Polish footballer
- Zbigniew Zakrzewski (economist) (1912–1992), Polish economist
