= Zenon Jankowski =

Aircraft pilot and astronaut

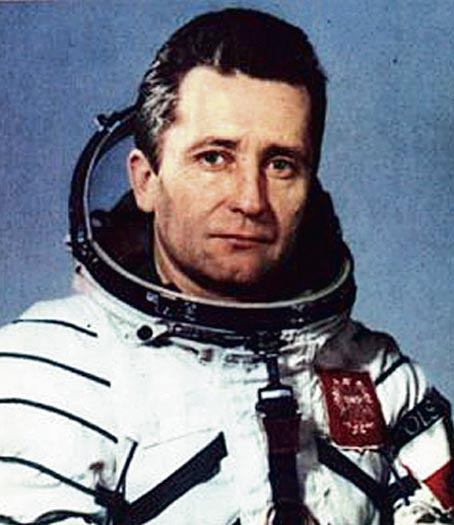
- Zenon Jankowski in 1978.
- Born: 22 November 1937 (age 88); Poznań, Second Polish Republic
- Education: Polish Air Force University
- Occupations: Fighter pilot, astronaut
- Space career

Interkosmos Cosmonaut
- Rank: Colonel (Polish People's Army)
- Time in space: 0s
- Selection: 1976 Interkosmos Group
- Missions: Soyuz 30 (reserve crew)

Zenon Jankowski (Polish: [ˈzɛ.nɔn jaŋˈkɔf.ski]; born 22 November 1937) is a retired fighter pilot, colonel of the Polish People's Army and astronaut. He was a reserve crew member of the 1978 Soyuz 30 space mission.

== Biography ==
Zenon Jankowski was born on 22 November 1937 in the city of Poznań, Second Polish Republic, into a working class family. In 1956, he graduated the Marcin Kasprzak High School (now known as the St. John Cantius High School) in Poznań.

In 1956, he enrolled in the Officer Flight School No. 5 in Radom, Poland, and in 1957, he transferred to the Polish Air Force University in Dęblin, Poland. On 13 March 1960, he had graduated and was passed out with the rank of second lieutenant, and later the same year, was given the rank of lieutenant. Prior to his graduation, he became a flight instructor. Following his graduation, from 1960 to 1962, he taught second standard-bearer officer cadets how to pilot MiG-15 jet-powered fighter aircraft. Since 1962, he served in the fighter-bomber unit in the Polish People's Army Air Force. Since 1964, he was a member of the Polish United Workers' Party. In 1966, he was sent to the Academy of the General Staff of the Polish Army, which he graduated in 1969. Following his graduation, he served in the fighter-bomber unit, where he was the commander of the fighter-bomber flight unit, squadron's rifle service chief, squadron commander, and air regiment navigator. In 1976, he became the deputy commander of the air regiment, and was given the rank of lieutenant colonel.

In 1976, Jankowski was included in the list of ten potential candidates to become astronauts from Poland, in the Interkosmos Soviet space program. By that time, he had spent over two thousand hours piloting planes. The candidates had spent two weeks training in Zakopane, following which, from them were chosen five people to the next phase of training and tests that took place in Poland and the Soviet Union. They were: Andrzej Bugała, Henryk Hałka, Mirosław Hermaszewski, Zenon Jankowski, and Tadeusz Kuziora. Shortly after, Andrzej Bugała was excluded from the list, with the remaining candidates continuing their tests and training, which lasted from October to November 1976.

On 27 November 1976, Hermaszewski and Jankowski were chosen as the two final candidates, and on 4 December 1976, they began their training in the Yuri Gagarin Cosmonaut Training Center, located in Zvyozdny gorodok, Soviet Union. In July 1977, the candidates from Poland and Soviet Union were divided into pairs. Jankowski was paired up with Valery Kubasov, an engineer, who became the leader of their group. On 25 June 1978, was decided, that Pyotr Klimuk and Mirosław Hermaszewski, would be the primary crew, while Kubasov and Jankowski, a reserve crew, of the Soyuz 30 spacecraft mission. Two days later, on 27 June 1978, the mission, with Klimuk and Hermaszewski on board, had begun, with the spacecraft reaching the orbit and docking to the Salyut 6 space station. Duration of the mission, until 5 July 1978, Jankowski served as a consultant of flight director.

Later, he returned to the service in the Polish People's Army Air Force. He eventually retired, with the rank of colonel. After retiring, he moved to the town of Luboń, located near the city of Poznań, Poland.

== Private life ==
Jankowski has a wife, with whom, he has one child. He resides in the town of Luboń, located near the city of Poznań, Poland.

== Commemoration ==
In 1978, Poczta Polska (Polish Post) had printed postage stamps, depicting Zenon Jankowski, with the caption reading The first Pole in space (Polish: Pierwszy Polak w kosmosie). Identical postage stamps, depicting Mirosław Hermaszewski were also printed. Both versions were made ahead of the start of Soyuz 30 mission, as it was not decided yet, who would be chosen for the mission. Following Hermaszewski being chosen for the mission, the stamps of Jankowski were ordered to be destroyed. However, around 800 stamps that were sent to a distributor in the United States, had survived.

The story of Jankowski was depicted in 1978 documentary films Zenon Jankowski, and Wita was Polska. Both films were written and directed by Bohdan Świątkiewicz, and made by Wytwórnia Filmowa Czołówka (Czołówka Film Studio).

== Awards and decorations ==
- Commander's Cross of the Order of Polonia Restituta (1978)
- Golden Cross of Merit
- Golden Medal of the Armed Forces in the Service of the Fatherland
- Silver Medal of the Armed Forces in the Service of the Fatherland
- Bronze Medal of the Armed Forces in the Service of the Fatherland
- Golden Medal of Merit for National Defence
- Silver Medal of Merit for National Defence
- Bronze Medal of Merit for National Defence
- Janek Krasicki Golden Decoration
- Jubilee Medal "60 Years of the Armed Forces of the USSR"
