= Zupnik =

Zupnik may refer to:

- Żupnik, a historical Polish administrative title
- Župnik, parish (župa) priest, Croatia
- Żupnik (surname), Polish surname
- Zupnik - Ner Yisroel synagogue, Givat Shaul, Jerusalem
