= Soyuz 30 =

1978 Soviet crewed spaceflight to Salyut 6

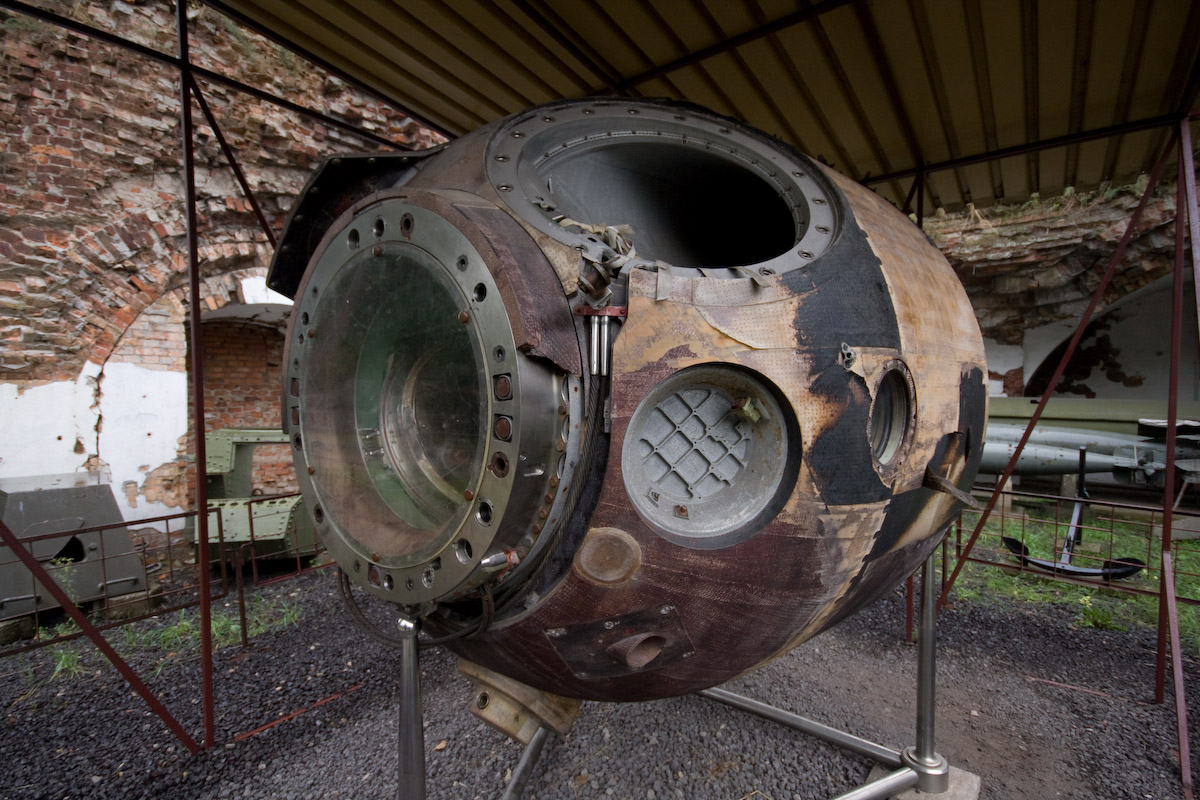
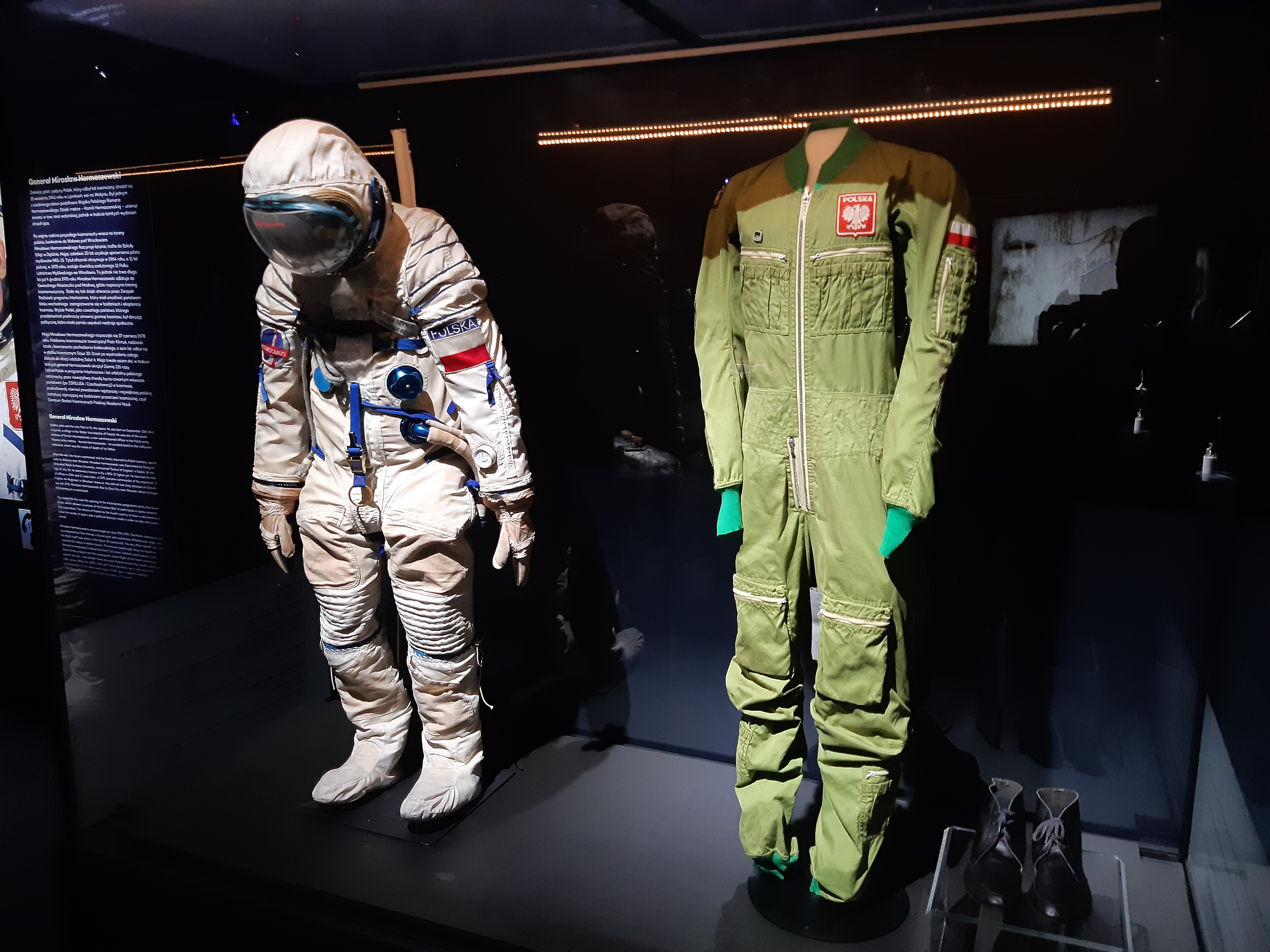
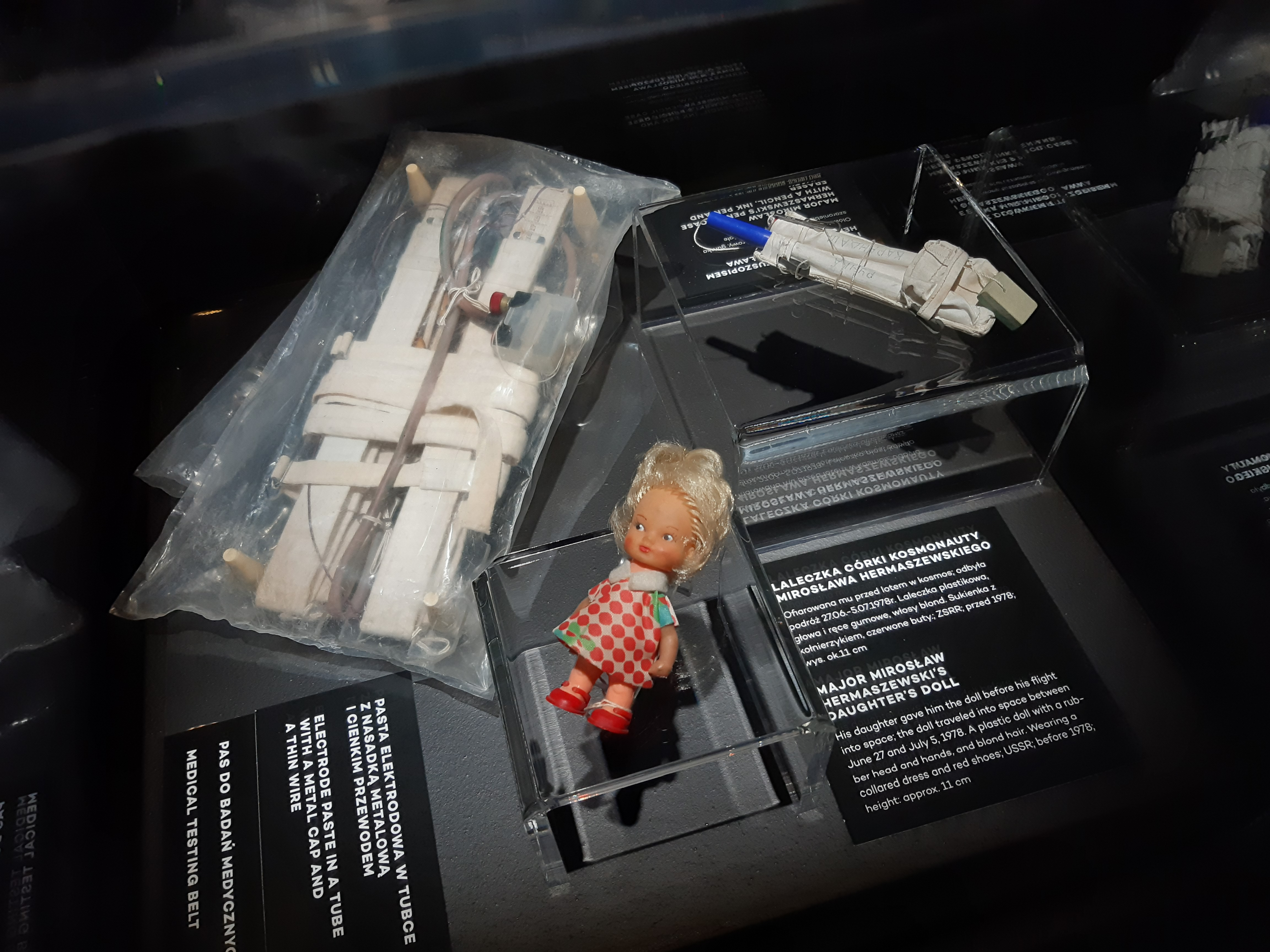
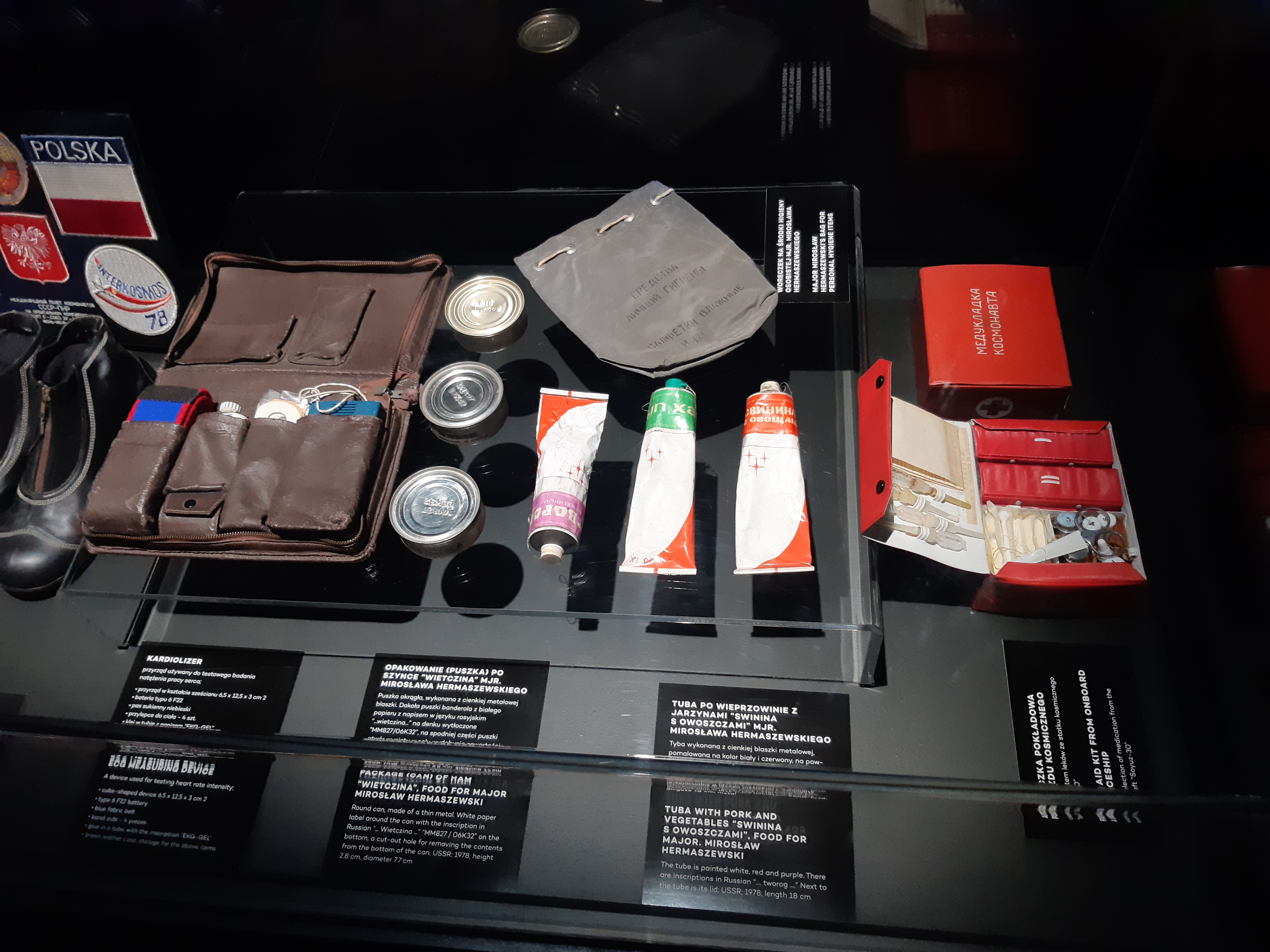
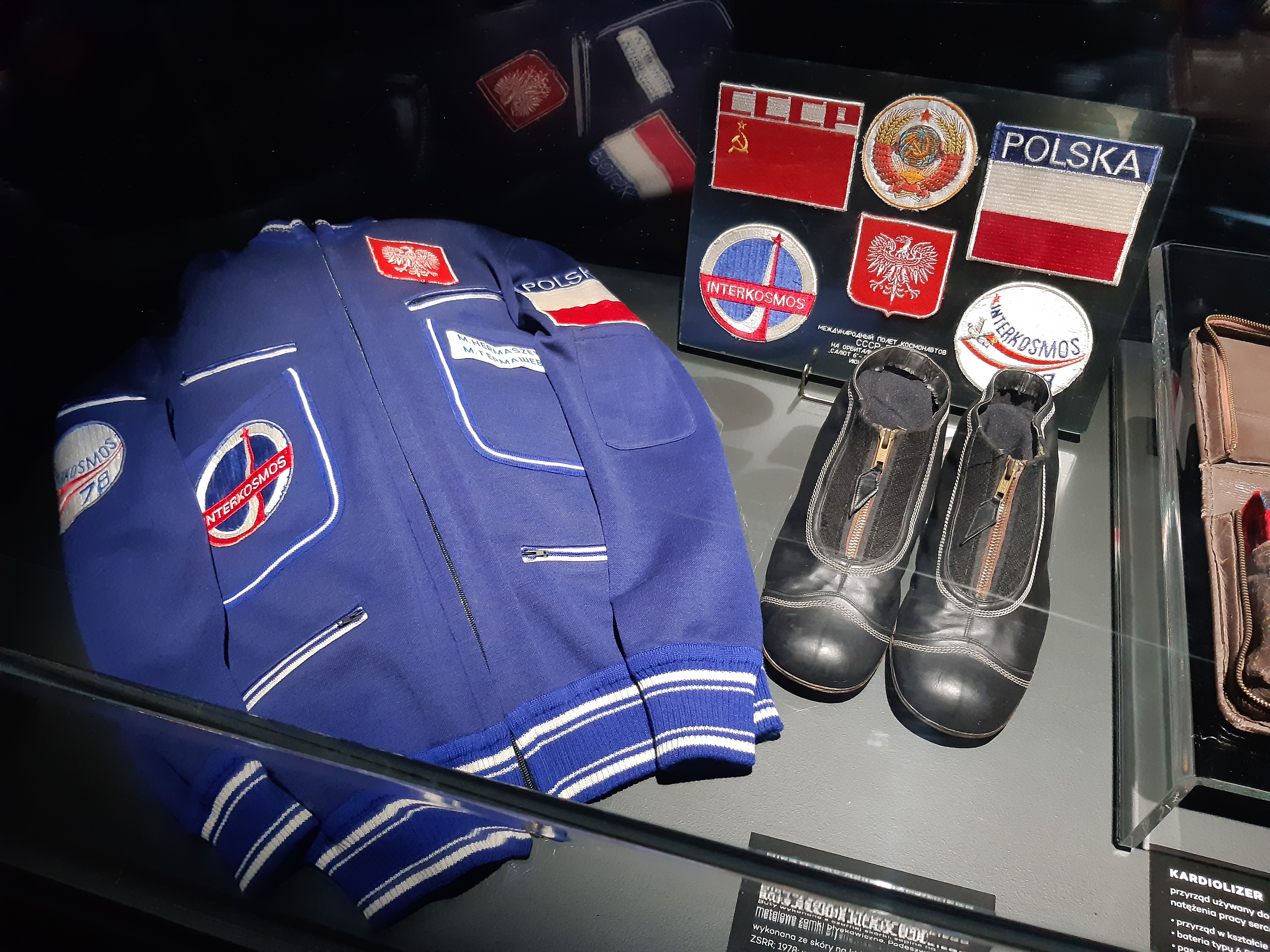
- The Soyuz 30 capsule, Hermaszewski's spacesuits and personal items, as well as memorabilia from the flight on display at the Museum of Polish Military Technology.
- Operator: Soviet space program
- COSPAR ID: 1978-065A
- SATCAT no.: 10968
- Mission duration: 7 days, 22 hours and 2 minutes
- Orbits completed: 125

Spacecraft properties
- Spacecraft type: Soyuz 7K-T/A9
- Manufacturer: NPO Energia
- Launch mass: 6,800 kg (15,000 lb)

Crew
- Crew size: 2
- Members: Pyotr Klimuk; Mirosław Hermaszewski
- Callsign: Кавказ (Kavkaz - "Caucasus")

Start of mission
- Launch date: 27 June 1978, 15:27:21 UTC
- Rocket: Soyuz-U
- Launch site: Baikonur 1/5

End of mission
- Landing date: 5 July 1978, 13:30:20 UTC
- Landing site: 300 km (190 mi) W of Tselinograd

Orbital parameters
- Reference system: Geocentric
- Regime: Low Earth
- Perigee altitude: 197.6 km (122.8 mi)
- Apogee altitude: 261.3 km (162.4 mi)
- Inclination: 51.66 degrees
- Period: 88.83 minutes

Docking with Salyut 6
- Docking port: Aft
- Docking date: 28 June 1978, 17:07:50 UTC
- Undocking date: 5 July 1978, 10:15:40 UTC
- Time docked: 6 days, 17 hours and 7 minutes
- Soyuz programme

Soyuz 30 (Russian: Союз 30, Union 30) was a 1978 crewed Soviet space flight to the Salyut 6 space station. It was the sixth mission to and fifth successful docking at the orbiting facility. The Soyuz 30 crew were the first to visit the long-duration Soyuz 29 resident crew.

Soyuz 30 carried Pyotr Klimuk and Mirosław Hermaszewski, the first Polish cosmonaut, aloft.

== Crew ==
Prime crew
Position	Cosmonaut
Commander	Pyotr Klimuk; EP-3; Third and last spaceflight
Research cosmonaut	Mirosław Hermaszewski, Interkosmos; EP-3; Only spaceflight

Backup crew
Position	Cosmonaut
Commander	Valery Kubasov
Flight engineer	Zenon Jankowski, Interkosmos

== Mission parameters ==
- Mass: 6,800 kg (15,000 lb)
- Perigee: 197.6 km (122.8 mi)
- Apogee: 261.3 km (162.4 mi)
- Inclination: 51.66°
- Period: 88.83 minutes

== Mission highlights ==
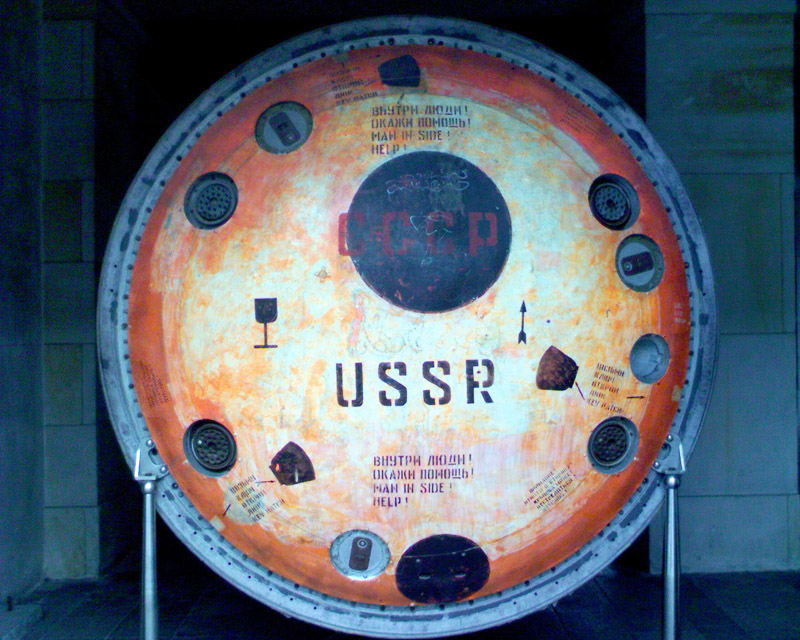
The heatshield of the capsule on display at the Museum of Polish Military Technology

The second Intercosmos mission was launched 27 June 1978 to the orbiting Salyut 6 space station. The Soyuz docked with the space station on 29 June, and cosmonauts Klimuk and Hermaszewski were greeted by Vladimir Kovalyonok and Aleksandr Ivanchenkov, the resident crew who had been on board for 12 days. For the third time, the Salyut was a four-man orbiting space laboratory.

The activities of the Soyuz 30 crew, however, were severely curtailed so as not to interfere with the Soyuz 29 crew. On the Soyuz 29 crew's rest day, the international crew had to stay in their Soyuz to perform their experiments. Nevertheless, Hermaszewski conducted many experiments. One was crystallization experiments which produced 47 grams of cadmium tellurium mercury semiconductors for use by infra-red detectors on board the station. The yield was far greater - 50% compared to 15% - than ground-based experiments.

The Soyuz 30 crew was trained, as all international crews, in the use of the MKF-6M camera. Training in part took place on a Tupolev Tu-134 flying at 10 km to best mimic conditions on the station. Hermaszewski photographed Poland in co-ordination with aircraft taking close-up photos, but bad weather over Poland limited the photo sessions. They additionally filmed the Aurora Borealis.

Hermaszewski participated in medical experiments which measured lung capacity and the heart during exercise and in a pressure suit. One experiment, which all four on board the station participated in, was Smak (the Polish word for taste), a taste experiment which sought answers to why some food was less palatable in weightlessness.

The Soyuz 30 crew packed their experiments into their capsule and returned to Earth 5 July, landing in a Rostov state farm field 300 km west of Tselinograd.

During this space flight, new equipment developed in the USSR and the socialist countries of Eastern Europe was tested (for example, the Polish cosmonaut M. Hermaszewski had a personal heart rate monitor developed by a factory in Warsaw - after all these tests and trials were completed, their serial production began in 1979).

== See also ==
- List of human spaceflights to Salyut space stations
- List of Salyut expeditions
