= Żupnik (surname) =

Żupnik or Zupnik is a Polish language occupational surname derived from the occupation of Żupnik.

The surname may refer to:

- Zbigniew Żupnik (1951–2000), Polish painter
- Israel Zupnik, namesake of three major buildings in Jerusalem, including Zupnik Synagogue in Givat Shaul
- Moshe Zupnik, a Jewish helper to Japanese diplomat Chiune Sugihara during the Holocaust
