= Mirosław Hermaszewski =

First Polish cosmonaut (1941–2022)

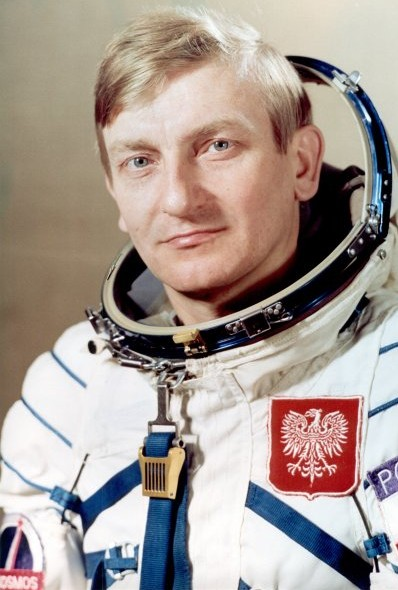
- Hermaszewski in 1978
- Born: 15 September 1941; Lipniki, Reichskommissariat Ukraine
- Died: 12 December 2022 (aged 81); Warsaw, Poland
- Education: Świerczewski General Staff Academy
- Occupations: Fighter pilot, cosmonaut, Politician
- Political party: Democratic Left Alliance
- Space career

Interkosmos Cosmonaut
- Rank: Brigadier general of Polish Air Force
- Time in space: 7d 22h 02m 59s
- Selection: 1976 Interkosmos Group
- Missions: Soyuz 30

Mirosław Hermaszewski (Polish: [miˈrɔswaf xɛrmaˈʂɛfski]; 15 September 1941 – 12 December 2022) was a Polish cosmonaut, fighter plane pilot, and Polish Air Force officer. He became the first and, at the time of his death in December 2022, only (Note: In June 2025, less than three years after Hermaszewski's death, Sławosz Uznański-Wiśniewski became the second Pole to fly to space.) Polish national to ever go to space when he flew aboard the Soviet Soyuz 30 spacecraft in 1978. He was the 89th human to reach outer space.

== Early life and education ==
Mirosław Hermaszewski was born on 15 September 1941 into a Polish family in Lipniki, (Note: The village of Lipniki was located in the Second Polish Republic; although the village no longer exists since the end of World War II due to the massacres that took place there, the lands where it used to be are now located in Ukraine.) formerly in the Wołyń Voivodeship of Poland, but at the time part of Reichskommissariat Ukraine, and since the end of the Second World War located in Ukraine. The youngest of Roman Hermaszewski and Kamila Bielawska's seven children, Mirosław was a survivor of the Volhynian slaughter during which the Ukrainian Insurgent Army murdered 19 members of his family, including his father when they attacked Lipniki on the night of 26–27 March 1943. At the time of the massacre, Hermaszewski was only 18 months old; the youngest victim from his family was 1½ years old, while the oldest—Hermaszewski's grandfather—was 90.

Although he has since highlighted the need to depart from nationalist sentiments and to accept responsibility for the genocide, Hermaszewski also condemned discrimination of the Ukrainian nation as a whole based on the actions of the Ukrainian Insurgent Army and the Ukrainian villagers who aided them in the murders. In an April 2015 interview with NaTemat.pl about the massacres, he was quoted as saying:

As a child, I suffered a lot due to what the Banderites did to us. But I have no grudge against the Ukrainians as a nation. I have many friends among them who publicly condemned these crimes long ago. But someone out there, in western Ukraine, keeps setting alight the petard of nationalism. (Note: Original quote: "Jako dziecko bardzo cierpiałem z tego, co nam banderowcy zrobili. Ale do Ukraińców jako narodu żalu nie mam. Mam wśród nich wielu znajomych, którzy publicznie już dawno potępili te zbrodnie. Ale ktoś tam, na zachodnie Ukrainie, ciągle podpala petardę nacjonalizmu.")

— Mirosław Hermaszewski, in a 2015 interview with Waldemar Kowalski of NaTemat.pl

Hermaszewski pointed out that after his mother barely escaped with her life from Lipniki, it was Ukrainian women from a neighbouring village who were acquainted with her that had given her shelter and looked after her during the ethnic cleansing of Poles and Jews from the region. He also recalled how his mother told him of many Ukrainians that took Poles in and cared for them during this period.

After the incorporation of former Polish territory into the Ukrainian SSR at the end of the war, those of Hermaszewski's family who survived were forcibly deported to Wołów near Wrocław, where he completed elementary and high school. From a young age he was interested in aviation, being a skillful self-taught modeller. In 1960, he completed a gliding pilotage course in the Wrocław Aeroklub. He flew at the airports in Oleśnica, Jeżów Sudecki, on the Żar mountain, and in Lisie Kąty.

== Military career ==
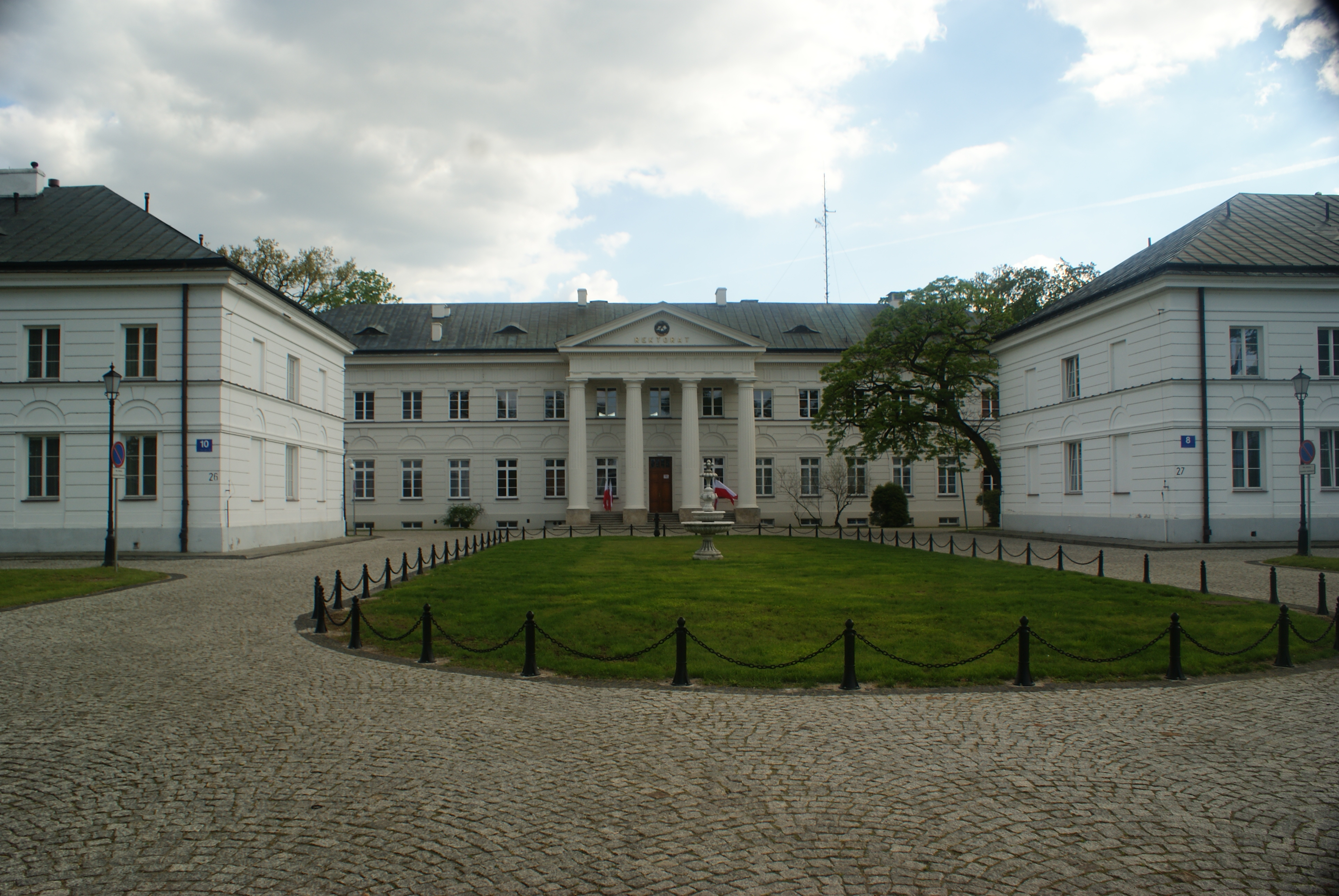
"School of Eaglets" in Dęblin, pictured in 2014

Hermaszewski finished his airplane pilotage course in Grudziądz in 1961, and in autumn of the same year started studying to be a fighter plane pilot at the "School of Eaglets" in Dęblin. There he mastered the TS-8 Bies trainer aircraft and then earned permission to fly the MiG-15 jet fighter. After graduating from the academy in March 1964 at the top of his class, he was assigned to the air defence regiment in Poznań with the rank of podporucznik and continued to study at the General Staff Academy in Warsaw; he learned to fly the MiG-21. In the years that followed, he continued to train while serving the Polish Air Force as the commander of squadrons and regiments in Słupsk, Gdynia and Wrocław. In 1971, he graduated from the Świerczewski Military Academy.

Over the course of his military career, Hermaszewski piloted gliders and training aircraft such as the aforementioned TS-8 Bies, the CSS-13, the TS-11 Iskra, and the PZL-130 Orlik, various piston engine airplanes like the Yak-18, as well as a plethora of jets – such as the MiG-15, MiG-17, Polish derivatives of the latter, several versions of the MiG-21, the F-16, F-18, Mirage 2000-5, the Su-27, MiG-29 and others.

== Interkosmos programme ==
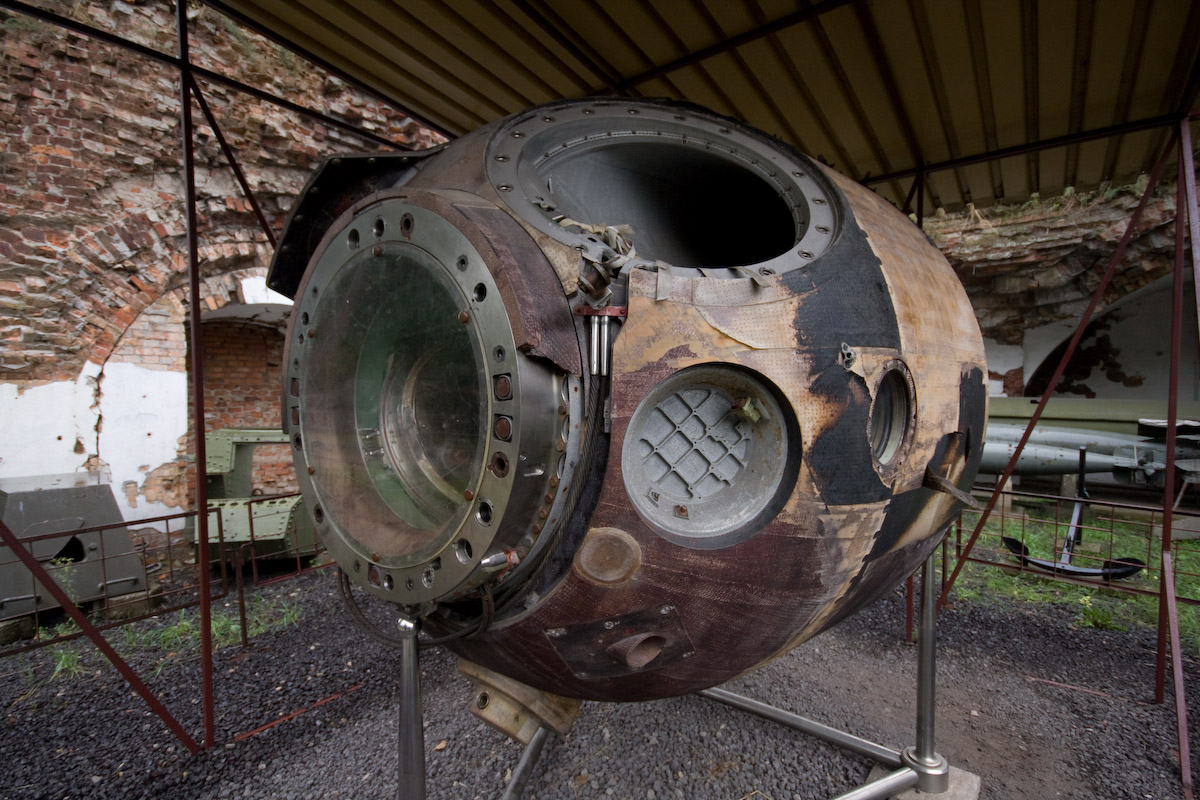
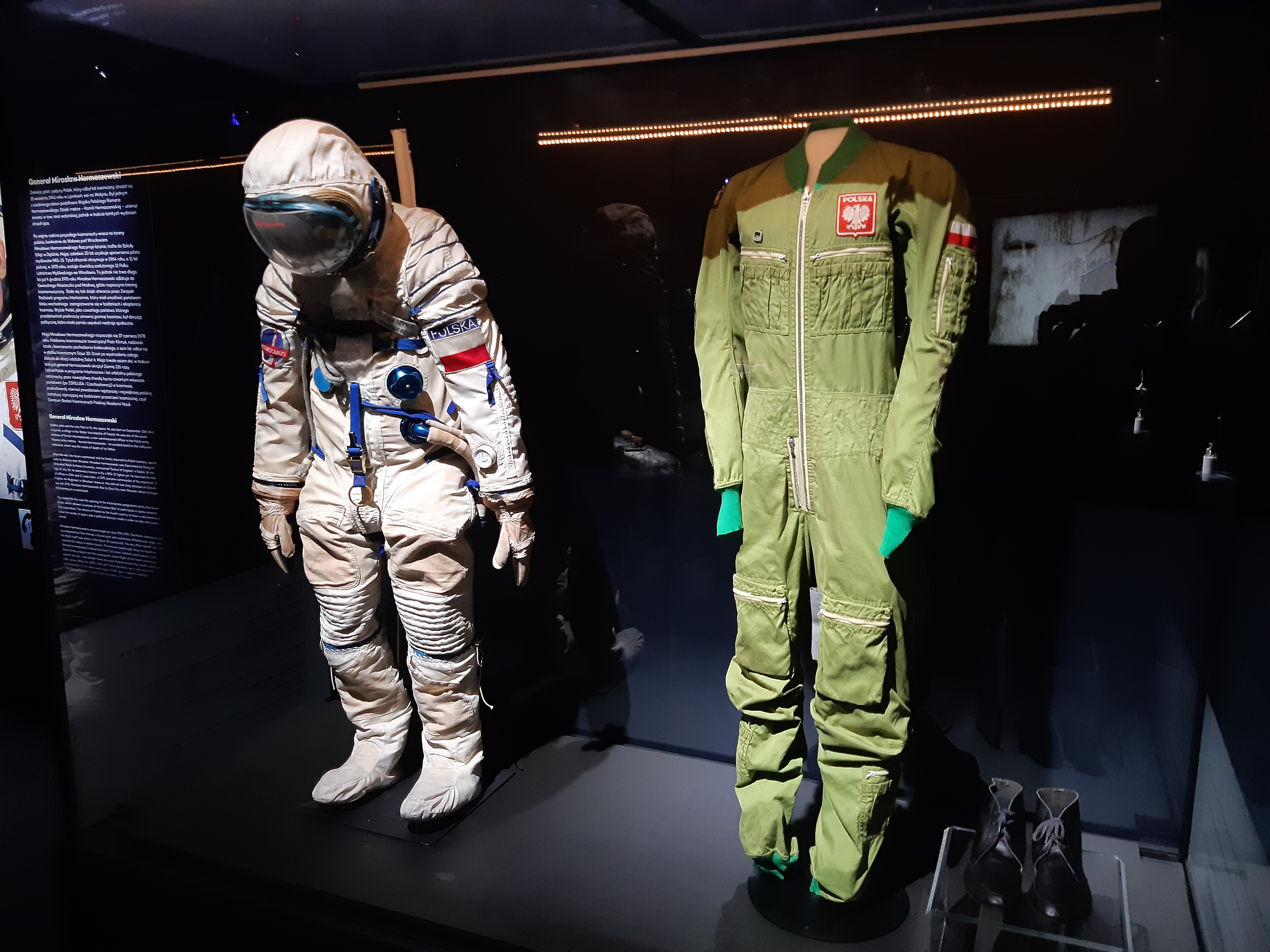
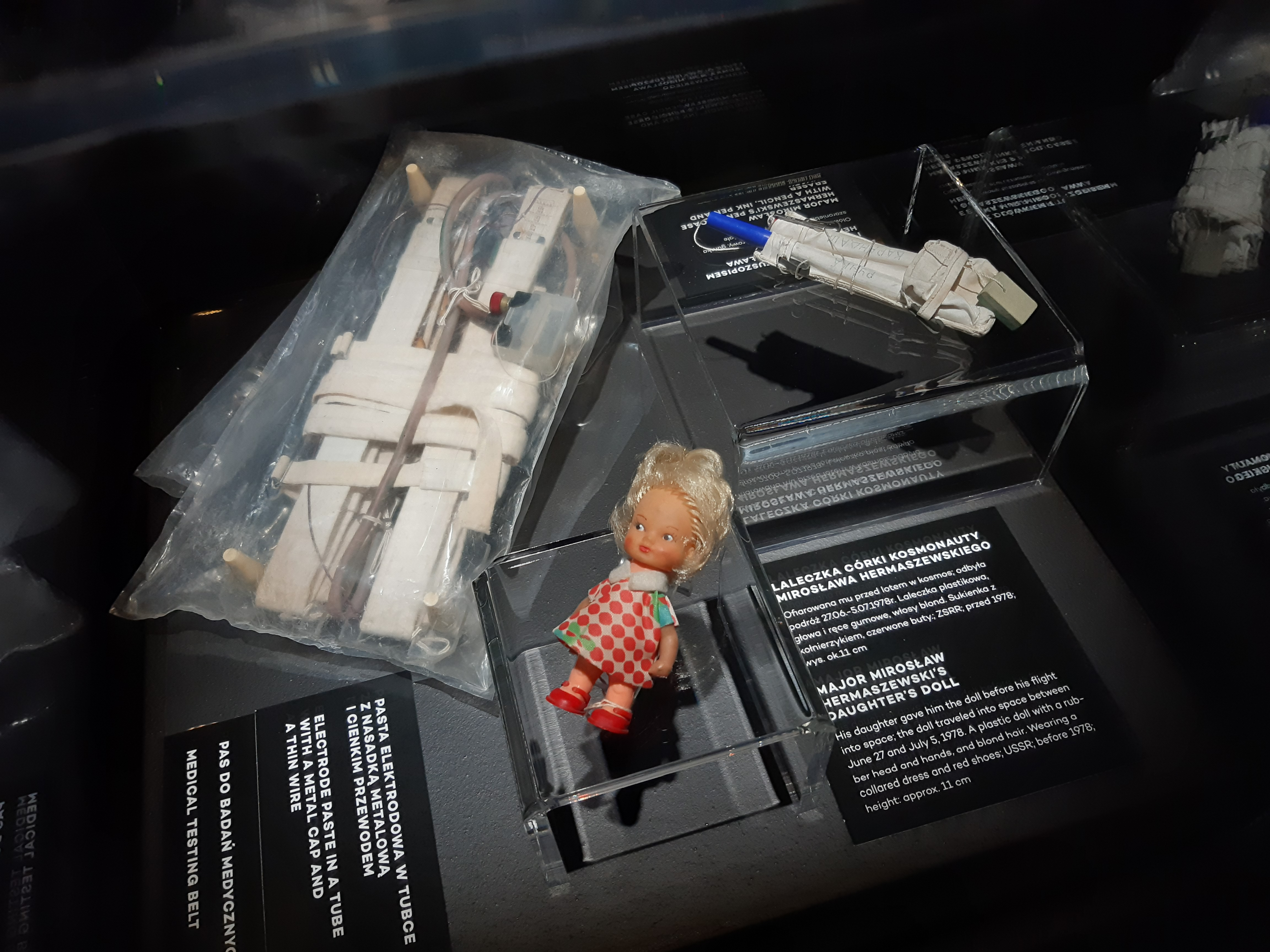
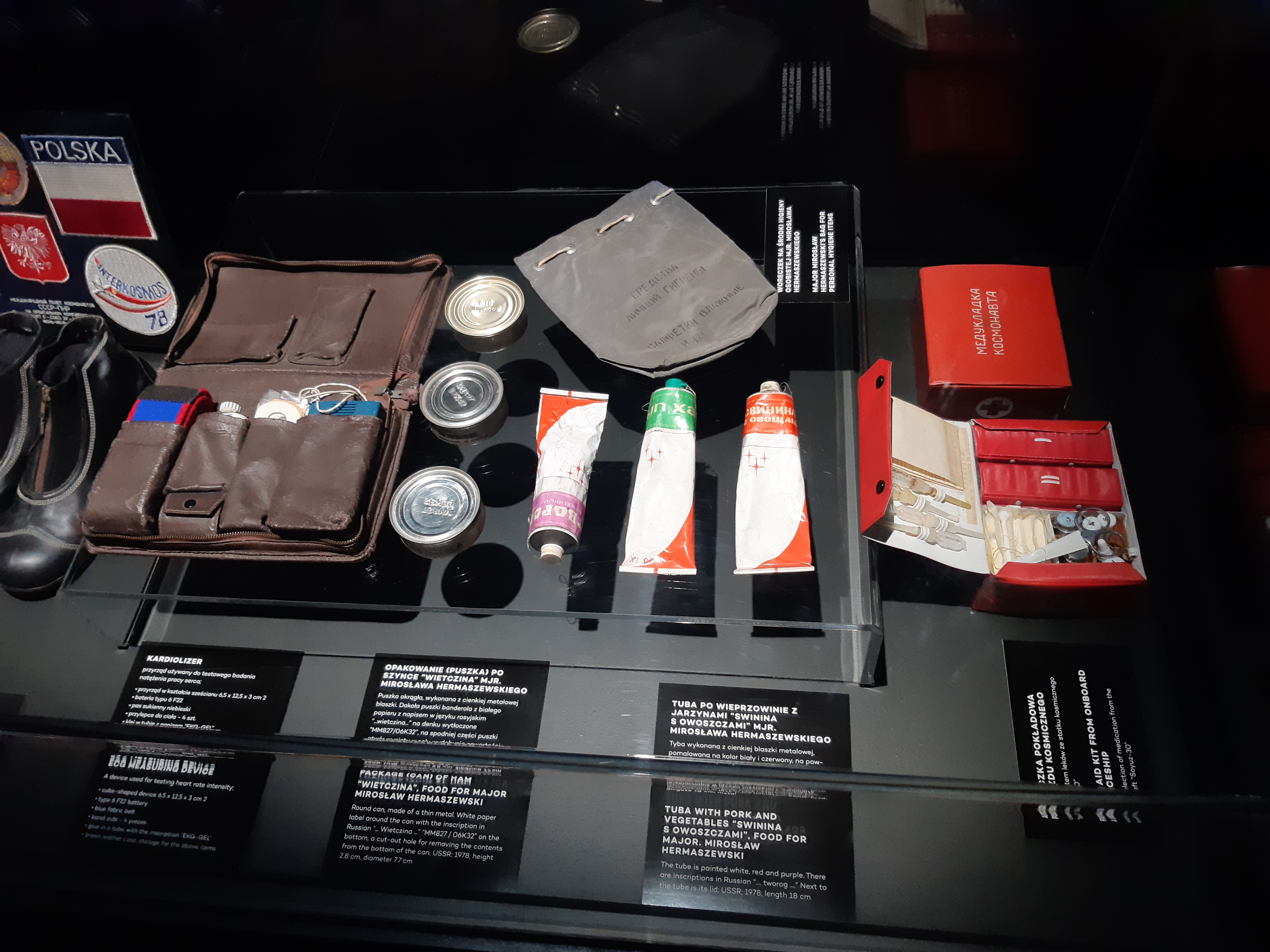
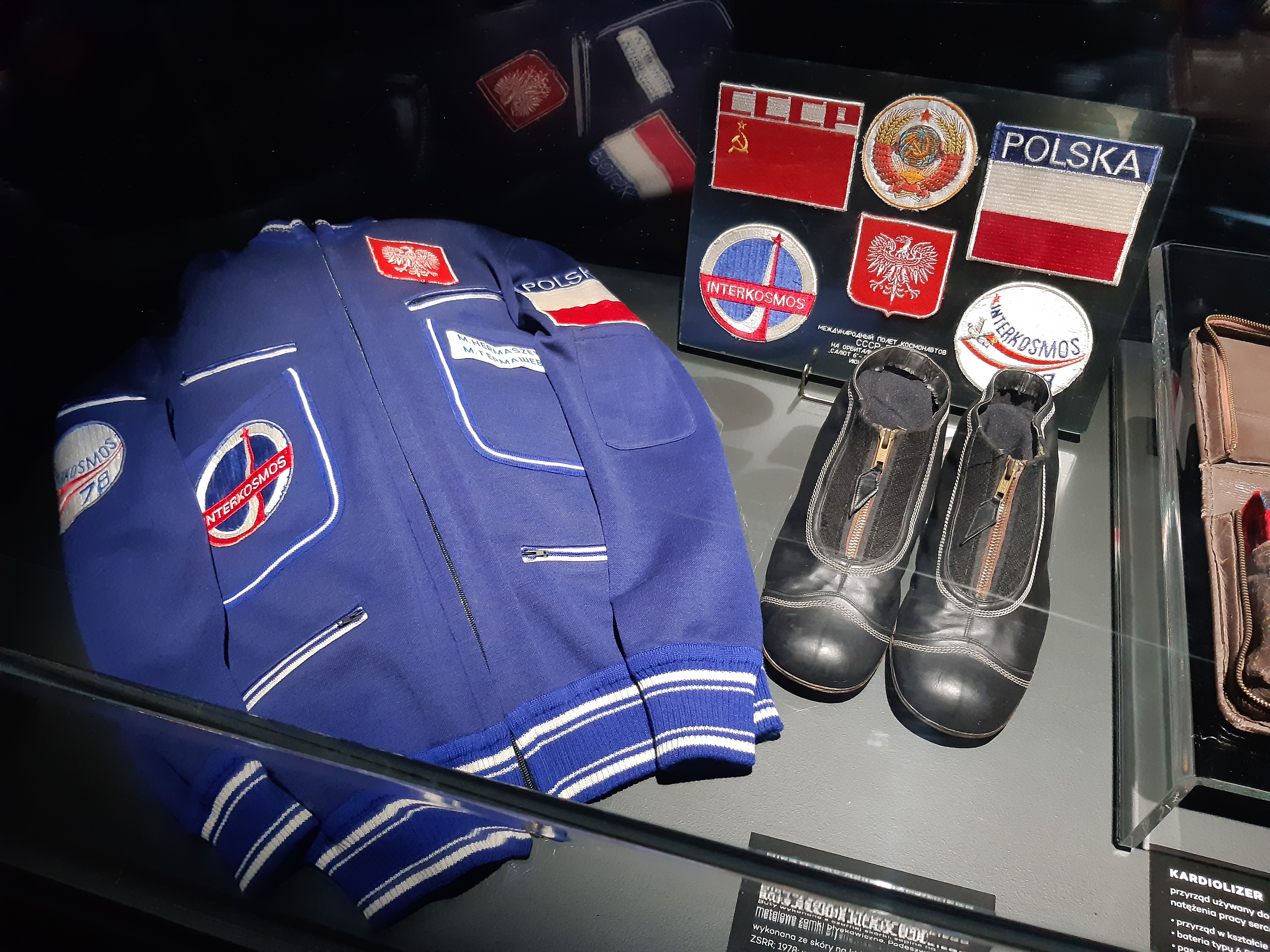

In 1976, he was chosen from a pool of 500 Polish military pilots to take part in the Interkosmos space programme. The group of candidates, who initially were not informed about what they were being selected and psychologically tested for, was narrowed down to 120, then just five, and eventually from an elite selection of only several pilots Hermaszewski was finally picked with Zenon Jankowski as his backup to participate in the Soyuz 30 mission. For a period of almost two years, they underwent extensive training for theoretical expertise, physical endurance, and resistance to mental stress (among various other factors) at the Yuri Gagarin Cosmonaut Training Center in Star City, near Moscow. Besides training in weightless conditions, psychological trials took place as well with candidates at one point having to complete 998 tests in one day.

In late June 1978, together with Soviet cosmonaut Pyotr Klimuk from Belarus, Hermaszewski flew from the Baikonur Cosmodrome to spend eight days aboard the Salyut 6 space station (from 17:27 on 27 June to 16:31 (Note: Launch date given in local Warsaw time, landing date in Moscow time.) on 5 July 1978). The latter fulfilled the role of deck engineer, while the former (having performed two space missions up to this point) served as commander. Minutes before the launch of their spacecraft, Hermaszewski said:

I, a citizen of the Polish People's Republic, feel honoured being granted the opportunity to carry out a spaceflight on the Soviet ship Soyuz 30 and the orbital station Salyut 6. The confidence entrusted in me, I will not disappoint. (Note: Original quote: "Ja, obywatel Polskiej Rzeczypospolitej Ludowej czuję się zaszczycony umożliwieniem mi wykonania lotu kosmicznego na radzieckim statku Sojuz 30 i orbitalnej stacji Salut 6. Okazanego mi zaufania nie zawiodę".)

— Mirosław Hermaszewski, at the Baikonur Cosmodrome, on 27 June 1978, minutes before Soyuz 30 takeoff

During their time in orbit, Klimuk and Hermaszewski carried out various geoscience experiments and photographed the Earth – orbiting it 126 times. Over the duration of their stay at the space station, Hermaszewski and Klimuk—sometimes with the aid of Vladimir Kovalyonok and Aleksandr Ivanchenkov, the two other cosmonauts who had already been stationed at Salyut 6 prior to the arrival of the Soyuz 30 mission—carried out a total of eleven different experiments while in space that had been planned internationally as part of the programme.

They landed in the steppes of Kazakhstan, 300 km west of Tselinograd. After the spaceflight, Hermaszewski achieved hero status in the countries of the Eastern Bloc (especially the Polish People's Republic) and was awarded several high honours, including the rarely-given-to-foreigners Hero of the Soviet Union title for his participation in the mission. A massive information and propaganda campaign around the Soyuz 30 mission and its participants was launched by the Polish government in coordination with the Soviet Union and other allied states in the Warsaw Pact. In 1985, he co-founded the Association of Space Explorers. Hermaszewski later became President of the Polish Astronautical Society (a position he held from 1986 to 1990).

== Later career ==
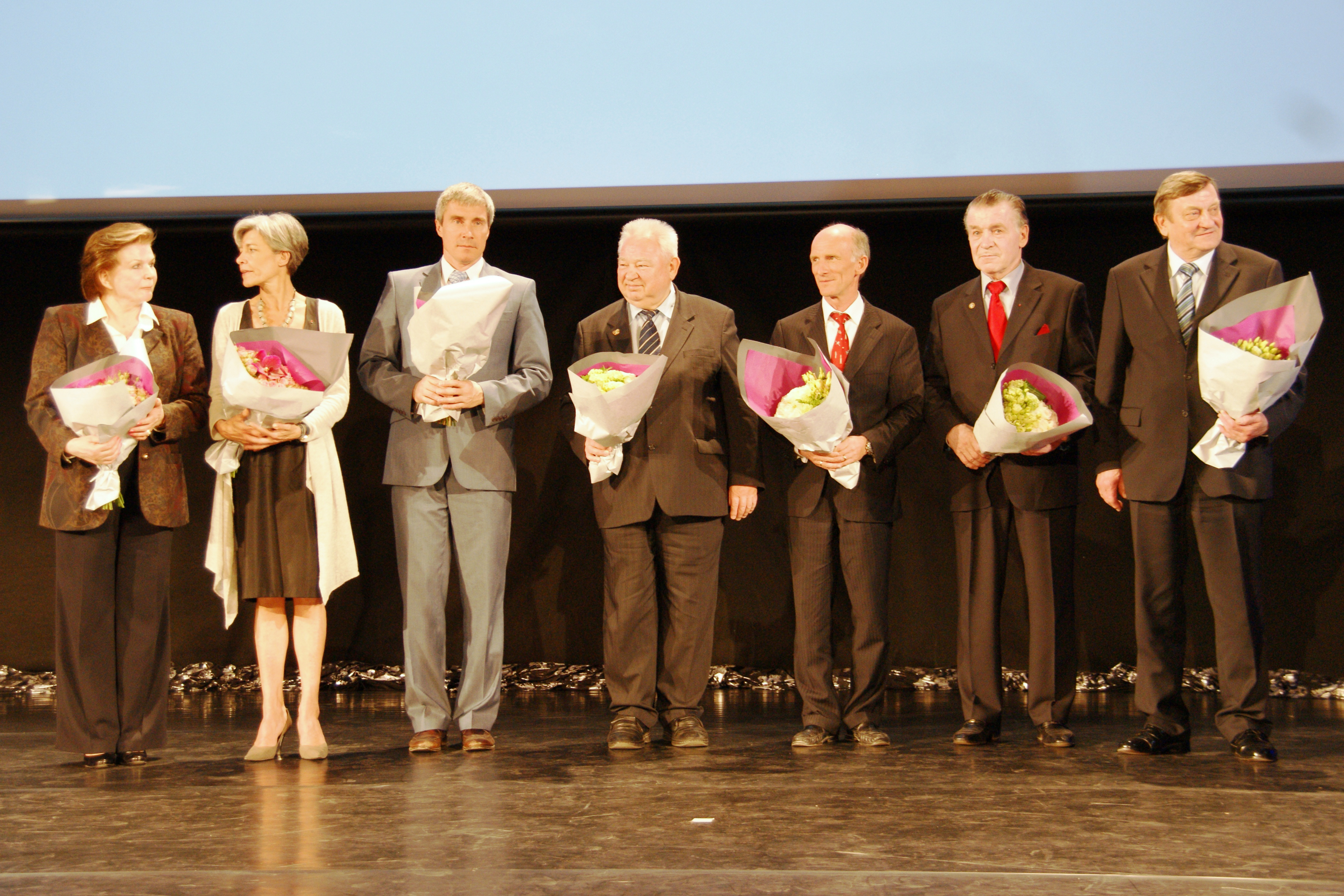
Hermaszewski, first from the right, alongside other cosmonauts and astronauts at UNESCO in 2011 for the 50th anniversary of the first crewed spaceflight.

When martial law in Poland was introduced on 13 December 1981, Hermaszewski was named as a member of the Military Council of National Salvation (WRON) without his consent or knowledge. He was studying in Moscow at the time and was at first ordered to return to Warsaw when martial law was declared, but after two weeks he was released to continue his studies. In 1982 he advanced to pułkownik military rank. Over a year after the end of martial law in the Polish People's Republic, in November 1984, Hermaszewski was appointed commander of the Fighter Pilots School in Dęblin. By 1987, he became head of that institution and his time as director has since then been assessed very positively, as his superiors noted the progress in team integration, as well as an increase in the didactic and educational level at the university.

In 1988, he was promoted to the rank of brigadier general and continued to serve in high-ranking positions for the training of new combat pilots. Between 1991 and 1992, Hermaszewski served as second-in-command of the Polish Air Force and Air Defence. He performed his final flight in a MiG-29, in October 2005, and after that retired; in his 40 years of service for the Polish Air Force, he spent 2047 hours in the air.

Following retirement from the military, he unsuccessfully stood in 2001 Polish parliamentary elections as an SLD-UP candidate to the Senat. He received 93,783 votes, which translated to 32.46% of the vote in his electoral region. In the 2002 Polish local elections, again as a candidate of the social-democratic SLD-UP party, he was elected into the Mazovian Regional Assembly with 10,463 votes. He then became a member of the SLD party and ran once again in Polish parliamentary elections in 2005, with 5,223 votes but no mandate. In 2009, Universitas published his autobiographical story Ciężar nieważkości. Opowieść pilota-kosmonauty ("The Weight of Weightlessness. Story of a Pilot-Cosmonaut") to positive reception from readers, leading to reprints and several expanded versions being published in the decade that followed.

Hermaszewski was set to try his hand at politics once more as a candidate for the European Parliament, again from the SLD party, in the 2014 elections. Ultimately he decided not to take part, as his son-in-law was also running for office but via an opposing political party. In 2018, the conservative ruling Law and Justice party of Poland—mirroring similar efforts from 2007—tried to vote through a law that would collectively demote all former members of the aforementioned WRON from the early 1980s to the lowest rank of private, including Hermaszewski. The so-called "degradation act" was met with controversy in Polish and foreign media primarily due to the case of Hermaszewski, who was initially included as a member of the WRON without his consent or knowledge. In the end, the proposed law was vetoed by President Andrzej Duda, who used Hermaszewski's case as one of the reasons why the "degradation act" needs to be rewritten.

== Personal life ==
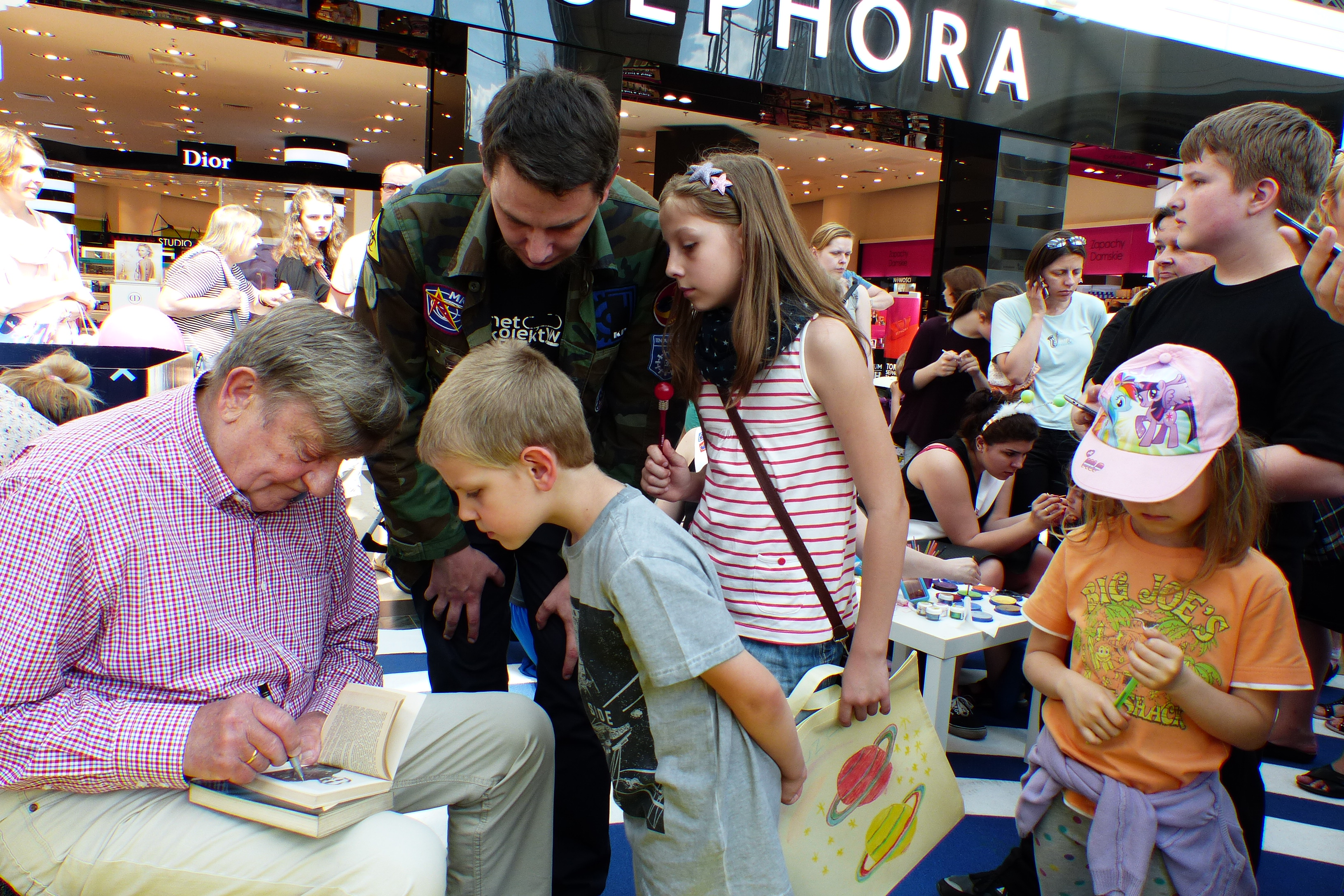
Mirosław Hermaszewski at a meeting in Warsaw, May 2016

Hermaszewski was interested in aviation and model aircraft from an early age. He was married to Emilia (née Łazar) Hermaszewska from 1966 until his death; together they had two children, Mirosław (born 1966) and Emilia (born 1974). They also had four grandchildren: Julia, Amelia, Emilia, and Stanisław as well as a pet Yorkshire Terrier Giokonda. Hermaszewski's son, Porucznik Mirosław Roman Hermaszewski, followed in the footsteps of his father and uncle, graduating from the Polish Air Force University to become a military reserve force officer. Hermaszewski's daughter Emilia married politician Ryszard Czarnecki.

During their training and after their joint mission to the Salyut 6 orbital station, Pyotr Klimuk and Mirosław Hermaszewski befriended each other – they stayed in touch and remained close friends ever since. Mirosław also befriended numerous other persons associated with the Soviet space programme during his time in Russia and Kazakhstan, including members of Yuri Gagarin's family and Alexei Leonov. Hermaszewski continued to express gratitude for being given the opportunity to see the cosmos firsthand and recalled it very fondly, admitting that he missed it and still dreamed about the experience often. He regularly visited schools and spoke with children of all ages, as well as attending interviews with various media outlets; he has been described as a "modest and likeable person". Hermaszewski said he had an "aesthetic experience" that transformed into a "spiritual experience" while aboard the Soyuz 30 in space, but he viewed faith and religion as an intimate and private matter.

Hermaszewski was highly critical of for-profit spaceflight and viewed space exploration as something that should to be done for science and human progress. In an interview he once stated:

Once, when the Cold War was going on, loads of money was being spent on armaments. When this period passed, some of this money was allocated to space programmes. Cooperation between the USA, Russia and other countries intensified. And there are effects. Financially, one country will definitely not be able to fly to Mars. Political decisions are needed, followed by money. A race to prestige on an "us" or "them" basis will not lead to anything. It must be "we" in a general sense—Earthlings. But there is still no such serious agreement. (Note: Original quote: "Kiedyś, gdy trwała zimna wojna, wielkie pieniądze przeznaczano na zbrojenia. Gdy ten okres minął, część tych pieniędzy przeznaczono na programy kosmiczne. Zintensyfikowała się współpraca USA, Rosji i innych krajów. I efekty są. Jeden kraj z całą pewnością nie udźwignie finansowo lotu na Marsa. Potrzebne są decyzje polityczne, za którymi idą pieniądze. Wyścig do prestiżu na zasadzie 'my' albo 'oni' do niczego nie doprowadzi. To musi być 'my' w sensie ogólnym — Ziemianie. Ale takiego poważnego porozumienia wciąż nie ma".)

— Mirosław Hermaszewski, in a 2010 interview with Nauka w Polsce

Mirosław Hermaszewski supported Polish engineer Sławosz Uznański-Wiśniewski during the latter's selection process for the 2022 European Space Agency Astronaut Group. In a February 2025 interview, Uznański stated that Hermaszewski was the first person to call him with congratulations in the morning after he was accepted. Uznański would go on to be selected for the European Space Agency's Ignis part of Axiom Mission 4, citing Hermaszewski as a major inspiration. On 25 June 2025, less than three years after Hermaszewski's death, Uznański-Wiśniewski launched to space as the second Polish person in history. Aboard the Crew Dragon Grace that took Axiom Mission 4 to the International Space Station, Uznański-Wiśniewski brought the same Polish flag that first flew to space in 1978 attached to Hermaszewski's spacesuit.

== Death ==
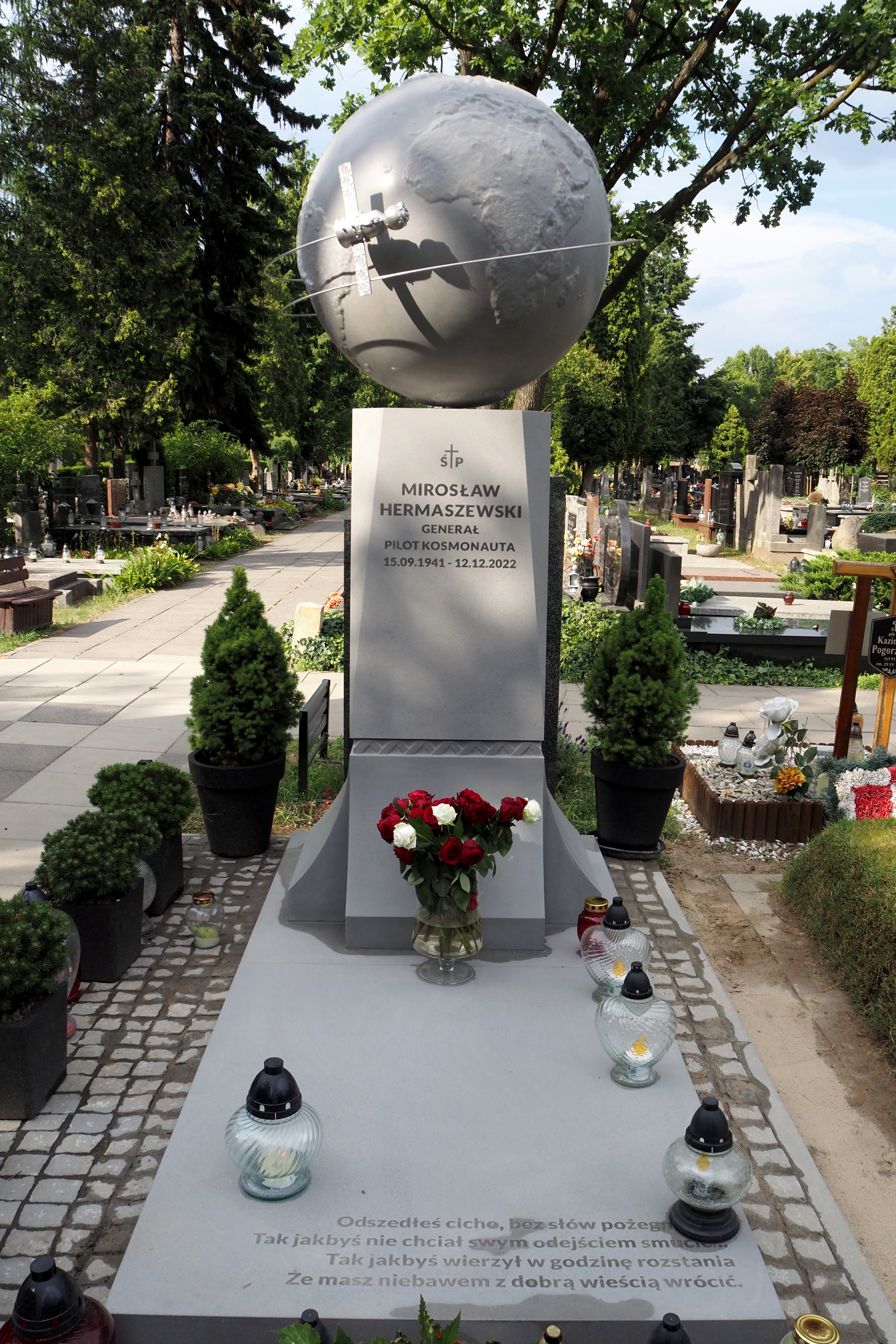
Hermaszewski's grave at the Powązki Military Cemetery in Warsaw

On 12 December 2022, Hermaszewski died at the age of 81. His son-in-law, Czarnecki, informed news media that Hermaszewski died in a Varsovian hospital due to complications resulting from a surgery he had undergone that morning. On 21 December, after Holy Mass in the Field Cathedral of the Polish Army, the cosmonaut was buried at Powązki Military Cemetery in Warsaw. The ceremony was of a state nature with the participation of a Representative Regiment of the Polish Armed Forces; four F-16 fighter jets flew over the necropolis in tribute of the deceased general.

A tombstone monument was unveiled on his grave at 17:20, on 27 June 2024 – the 46th anniversary of Mirosław Hermaszewski's spaceflight.

== Cultural significance ==
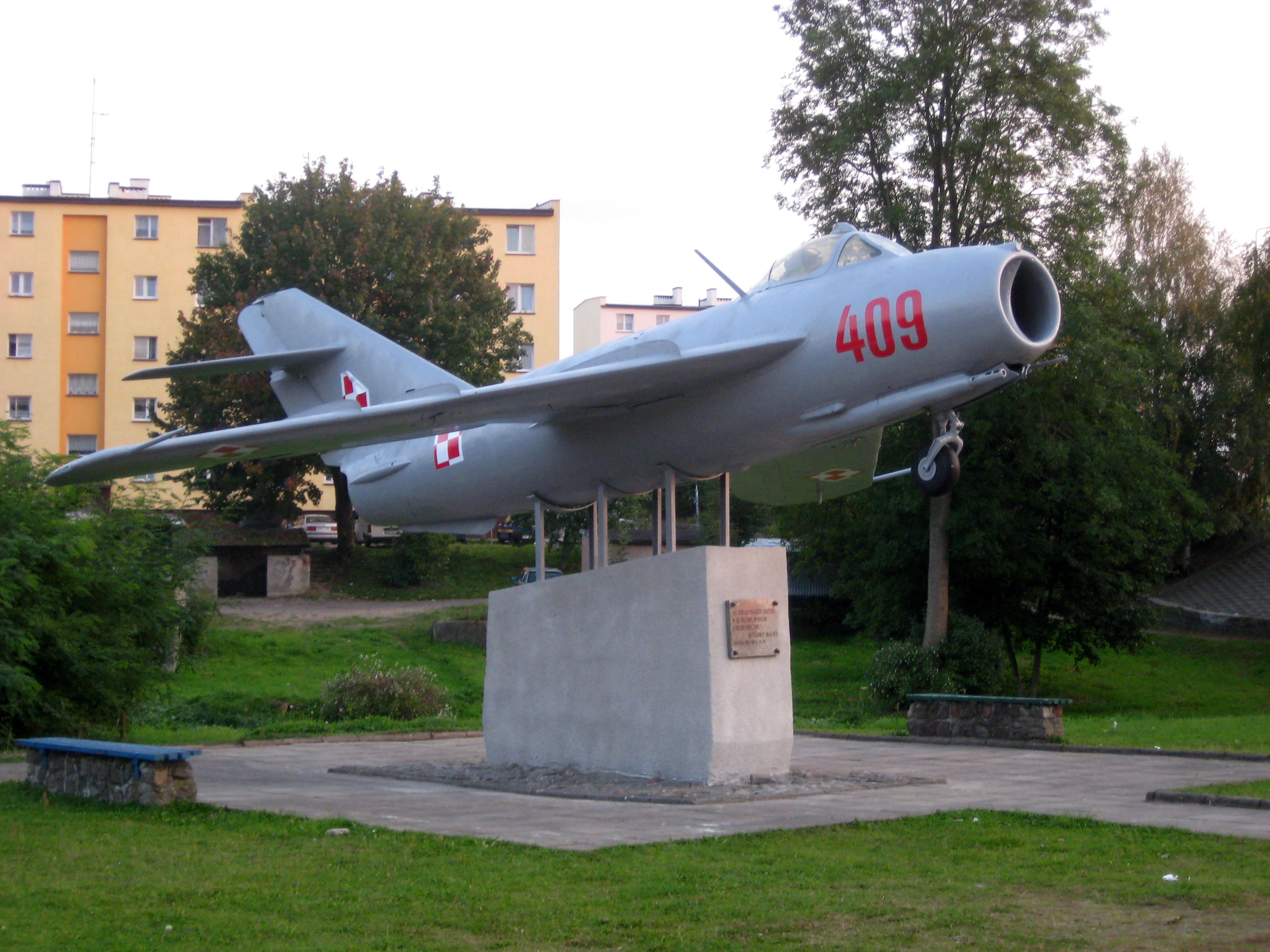
A MiG-17 previously flown by Hermaszewski, since 1989 used as a monument in Miastko

- In the Polish People's Republic, after the successful landing of Soyuz 30, numerous items of memorabilia were produced – postage stamps, posters, patches, pins, stickers, coins, medals, pennants, badges, and other small symbols – many of which bore the likeness of Mirosław Hermaszewski. In 1978 alone, books about Hermaszewski and his flight were printed in the following numbers: 90,000 copies of Polak melduje z kosmosu, Polska w kosmosie (30,000), Polak w kosmosie (80,000), and Droga Polaka na orbitę (20,000), for a total of 220,000 books. In addition, 92,000 black-and-white postcards, 90,000 copies of two photo-newspapers, and 2,000 sets of photographs, as well as other collectibles were produced. The Czołówka film studio put out four documentary-biographical films about the first Pole in space, all made by Bohdan Świątkiewicz.
- Anna German recorded the song W wielkiej kosmicznej rodzinie about Hermaszewski's mission in 1978.
- In Vietnam, a series of postage stamps was introduced in 1983 to commemorate the Soyuz 30 spaceflight. However, the surnames of the cosmonauts were rendered incorrectly as "Hepmazepski" (Hermaszewski) and "Klimuc" (Klimuk).
- In Wołów, the town in southwest Poland where Hermaszewski's family was relocated when he was a child, a monument "To the Glory of Polish Aviators and Cosmonauts" was opened in 1985 on the occasion of the 700th anniversary of Wołów receiving its town privileges. The monument is a Lim-5P attack aircraft that was flown by Hermaszewski during his military career.
- In Vitebsk, present-day northeast Belarus, a monument to cosmonauts Pyotr Klimuk and Mirosław Hermaszewski was opened in 1988.
- Similarly to the one in Wołów, one of the fighter jets that Hermaszewski flew on is used as a monument in Miastko. It was gifted to the town by the cosmonaut in 1989 and unveiled on the 50th anniversary of the outbreak of World War II; the text on its plaque reads: "To the glory of Polish wings on the 50th anniversary of the outbreak of the Second World War – citizens of Miastko".
- During his time in space, Hermaszewski wore a digital watch produced by Unitra Warel that was considered an advanced piece of technology for its time and was the first Polish electronic watch. In 2016, the Polish watchmaking company G. Gerlach produced the Kosmonauta – their own modernised version of the design, but updated for the capabilities of contemporary technology.
- Mirosław Hermaszewski was also honoured by the Russian Sturmanskie brand of wristwatches with a limited edition automatic chronograph series in 2019; although this watch was not styled after the Unitra Warel, it features unique markings with the badge of Polish military pilots on its face as well as the likeness of the first Polish cosmonaut on its reverse. Only 190 units were produced to reflect the 190 hours Hermaszewski spent in the cosmos, each sold in special capsule packaging with an original certificate of authenticity signed by Hermaszewski.
- Andrzej Pągowski designed a poster for Hermaszewski's 1978 spaceflight, featuring the cosmonaut's likeness. In 2025, he designed a new poster for Sławosz Uznański-Wiśniewski's Ignis mission.

== Honours and awards ==
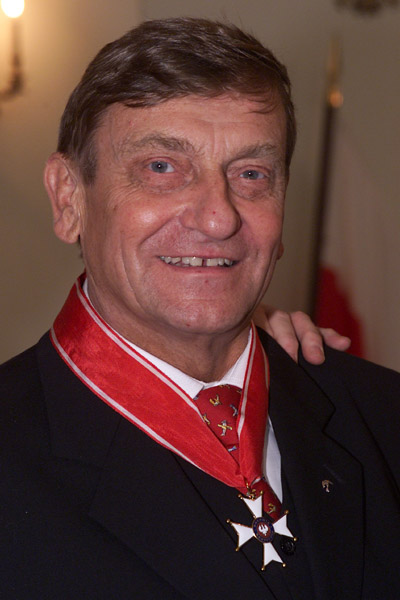
Mirosław Hermaszewski was awarded the Commander's Cross of the Order of Polonia Restituta in 2003 by then-President of Poland Aleksander Kwaśniewski.

- Commander's Cross of the Order of Polonia Restituta – 2003
- Order of the Cross of Grunwald 1st Class – 1978.
- Gold Cross of Merit
- Medal of the 40th Anniversary of People's Poland
- Gold Medal of the Armed Forces in the Service of the Fatherland
- Silver Medal of the Armed Forces in the Service of the Fatherland
- Bronze Medal of the Armed Forces in the Service of the Fatherland
- Gold Medal of Merit for National Defence
- Silver Medal of Merit for National Defence
- Bronze Medal of Merit for National Defence
- Aviator badge
- Parachutist Badge
- Honourable title and an Order of "Aviator Cosmonaut of the Polish People's Republic" – 1978
- Honourable title and an Order of "Military Pilot Merit of the Polish People's Republic" – 1978
- Entry in the Honourable Tome of Soldiers' Deeds (1978)
- "Master Class Military Pilot" Badge
- Gold Order of Merit of Lower Silesia – 2013
- Janek Krasicki Gold Order – 1978
- Cross of Merit (Polish Scouting and Guiding Association)
- Gold Medal "For Efforts in Strengthening the PRL–USSR Friendship"
- Order of the Smile – 1986
- Gold Star Hero of the Soviet Union (nr 11301) – USSR, 1978
- Order of Lenin – USSR, 1978
- Medal "For Strengthening of Brotherhood in Arms" – USSR
- Medal "For Merit in Space Exploration" – Russia, 2011
- Scharnhorst Order – East Germany
- Gold Medal of "Brotherhood in Arms" – East Germany
- Medal of the 40th Anniversary of the Liberation of Czechoslovakia
- Medal of the 30th Anniversary of the Armed Forces of Cuba
- Honourable Citizen of Arkalyk (1978), Wrocław (1978), Radom (1978), Frombork (1983), and Wołów (2011)

== See also ==
- Zenon Jankowski
- Pyotr Klimuk
- Alexei Leonov
- Sławosz Uznański-Wiśniewski
