= Zbigniew Oleśnicki =

Zbigniew Oleśnicki may refer to:

- Zbigniew Oleśnicki (cardinal) (1389–1455), Roman Catholic clergyman and a Polish statesman and diplomat
- Zbigniew Oleśnicki (primate of Poland) (c. 1430–1493), Roman Catholic clergyman and Polish politician
- Dobiesław Oleśnicki (15-century), Polish soldier, aristocrat and politician
- Mikołaj Oleśnicki the elder (d. 1556), Polish Calvinist nobleman and founder of the first Protestant academy in Poland
- Mikołaj Oleśnicki the younger (1558-1629), Polish nobleman and latterly voivode of Lublin

== See also ==
- Oleśnica County
