= Zbyněk =

Zbyněk (Czech pronunciation: [zbɪɲɛk]) is a Czech masculine given name. The Polish equivalent is Zbigniew.

Notable people with the name include:

- Zbyněk Zajíc (1376–1411), Czech nobleman
- Zbyněk Berka z Dubé (1551–1606), Catholic Cleric, cardinal, the tenth Archbishop of Prague
- Zbyněk Brynych (1927–1995), Czech film director and screenwriter
- Zbyněk Busta (born 1967), Czech football manager
- Zbyněk Drda (born 1987), Czech singer
- Zbyněk Fiala (born 1964), Czech cyclist
- Zbyněk Hampl (born 1988), Czech ice hockey player
- Zbyněk Hauzr (born 1973), Czech football goalkeeper
- Zbyněk Hejda (1930–2013), Czech poet, essayist and translator
- Zbyněk Hráček (born 1970), Czech International Grandmaster of chess
- Zbyněk Hrdel (born 1985), Czech ice hockey player
- Zbyněk Hubač (born 1940), Czechoslovak ski jumper
- Zbyněk Irgl (born 1980), Czech professional ice hockey player
- Zbyněk Krompolc (born 1978), Czech ski jumper
- Zbyněk Mařák (born 1971), Czech professional ice hockey player
- Zbyněk Michálek (born 1982), Czech professional ice hockey player
- Zbyněk Mlynařík (born 1977), Czech–Austrian tennis player
- Zbyněk Musiol, Czech footballer
- Zbyněk Novák (born 1983), Czech ice hockey player
- Zbyněk Ollender (born 1966), Czech professional football player
- Zbyněk Pánek (born 1972), Czech Nordic combined skier
- Zbyněk Pospěch (born 1982), Czech football forward
- Zbyněk Puleč (born 1948), Czech canoeist
- Zbyněk Šidák (1933–1999), Czech mathematician
- Zbyněk Stanjura (born 1964), Czech politician
- Zbyněk Zbyslav Stránský (1926–2016), Czech museologist
- Zbyněk Vostřák (1920–1985), Czech composer
- Zbyněk Žába (1917–1971), Czechoslovak Egyptologist
- Zbyněk Zeman (1928–2011), Czech historian
