= Adam Marczyński =

Polish artist

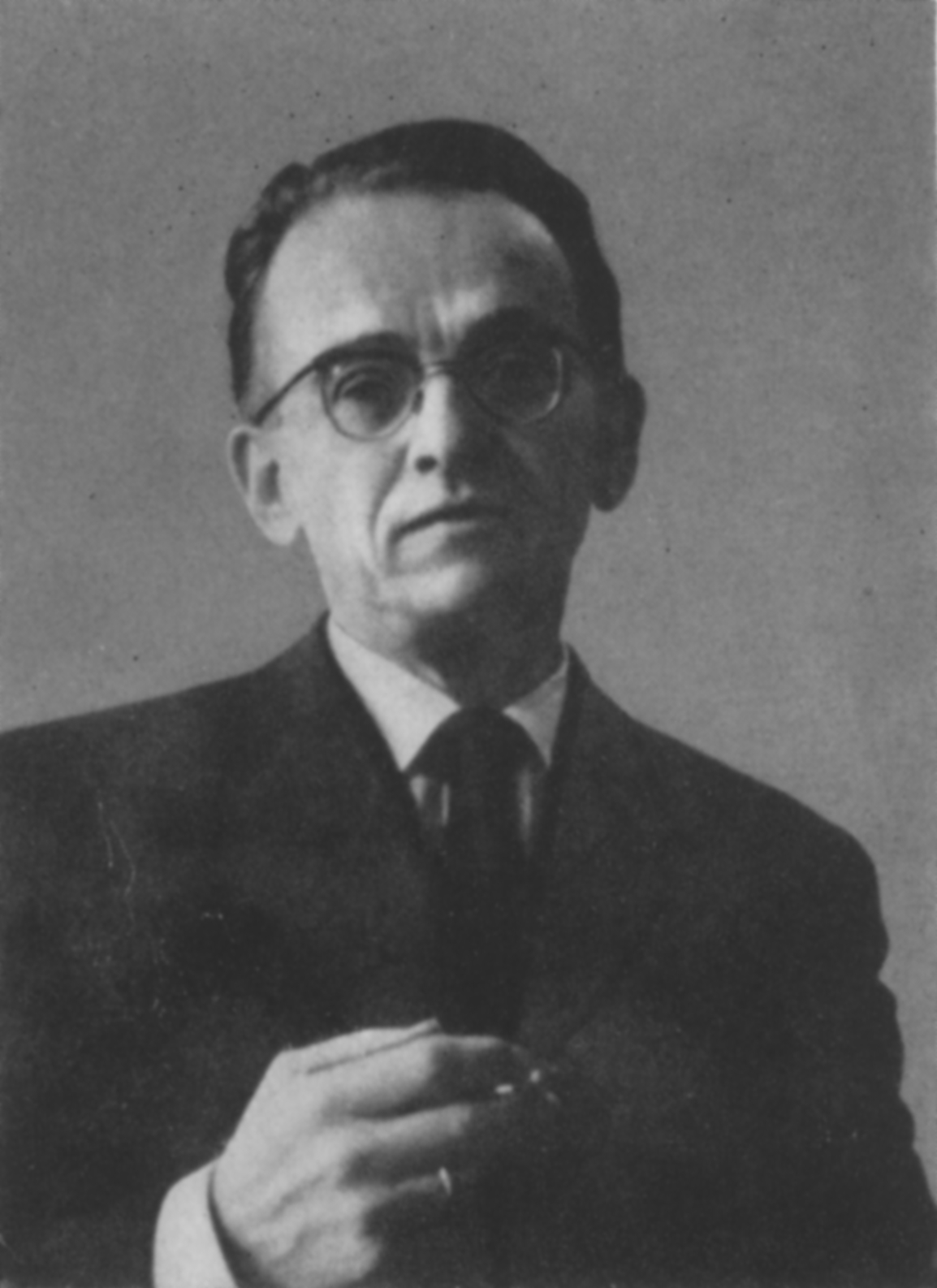
Adam Marczyński (before 1965)

Adam Marczyński (24 December 1908 – 13 January 1985) was a Polish painter. He died in Kraków. Marczyński came into his own as an artist of post-war Kraków.

He studied at the Academy of Fine Arts in Kraków. He started exhibiting in 1933 and had his first solo exhibition a few years after that. Marczyński taught at the academy from 1945 to 1979. One of his students at the academy was Zbigniew Żupnik. Besides teaching, he was a painter, did illustrations, was a graphic artist, and even did scenery design.

Around the war years, he embraced cubism and a Polish variation of post-Impressionism, called Colorism. Marczyński painted landscapes, portraits, still lifes, and interiors.

In the 1960s, he abandoned regular painting techniques, instead choosing to paint objects and make collages. By the '70s, Marczyński began making compositions in small cases. These items have doors that open and close; they became his main artistic focus.

Marczyński exhibited at many international art festivals, including the Venice Biennale in 1956 and the documenta II in Kassel in 1959. A catalogue was published in 1985 at a posthumous retrospective at the Gallery of the Office of Artistic Exhibitions in Kraków. His work was also part of the painting event in the art competition at the 1948 Summer Olympics.
