= Zbigniew Kaczmarek =

Zbigniew Kaczmarek may refer to:

- Zbigniew Kaczmarek (weightlifter) (1946–2023), Polish weightlifter, Olympic medalist
- Zbigniew Kaczmarek (footballer) (born 1962), Polish football player
