= Zbyszko =

- Gender: male

Origin
- Origin: Slavic
- Meaning: zbyć ("to get rid of")

Other names
- Related names: Zbigniew, Zbylut, Zbysław

Zbyszko is an old Polish name of Slavic origin, derived from diminutive form of names e.g. Zbigniew, Zbysław, Zbylut, etc.

Notable people with the name include:

- Stanislaus Zbyszko, strongman and professional wrestler prominent in the United States during the 1920s
- Larry Zbyszko, professional wrestler known for his feud with wrestling legend Bruno Sammartino
- Wladek Zbyszko, professional wrestler and strongman, brother of Stanislaus Zbyszko

== See also ==
- Zbigniew
- Zbylut (given name)
- Zabisco, fictional villain in the 1981 Indian film Naseeb, played by Yusuf Khan
