= St. John Cantius 3rd Secondary School in Poznań =

High school in Poznań, Poland

Coordinates: 52°24′16″N 16°55′58″E

- III Liceum Ogólnokształcące im. Jana Kantego
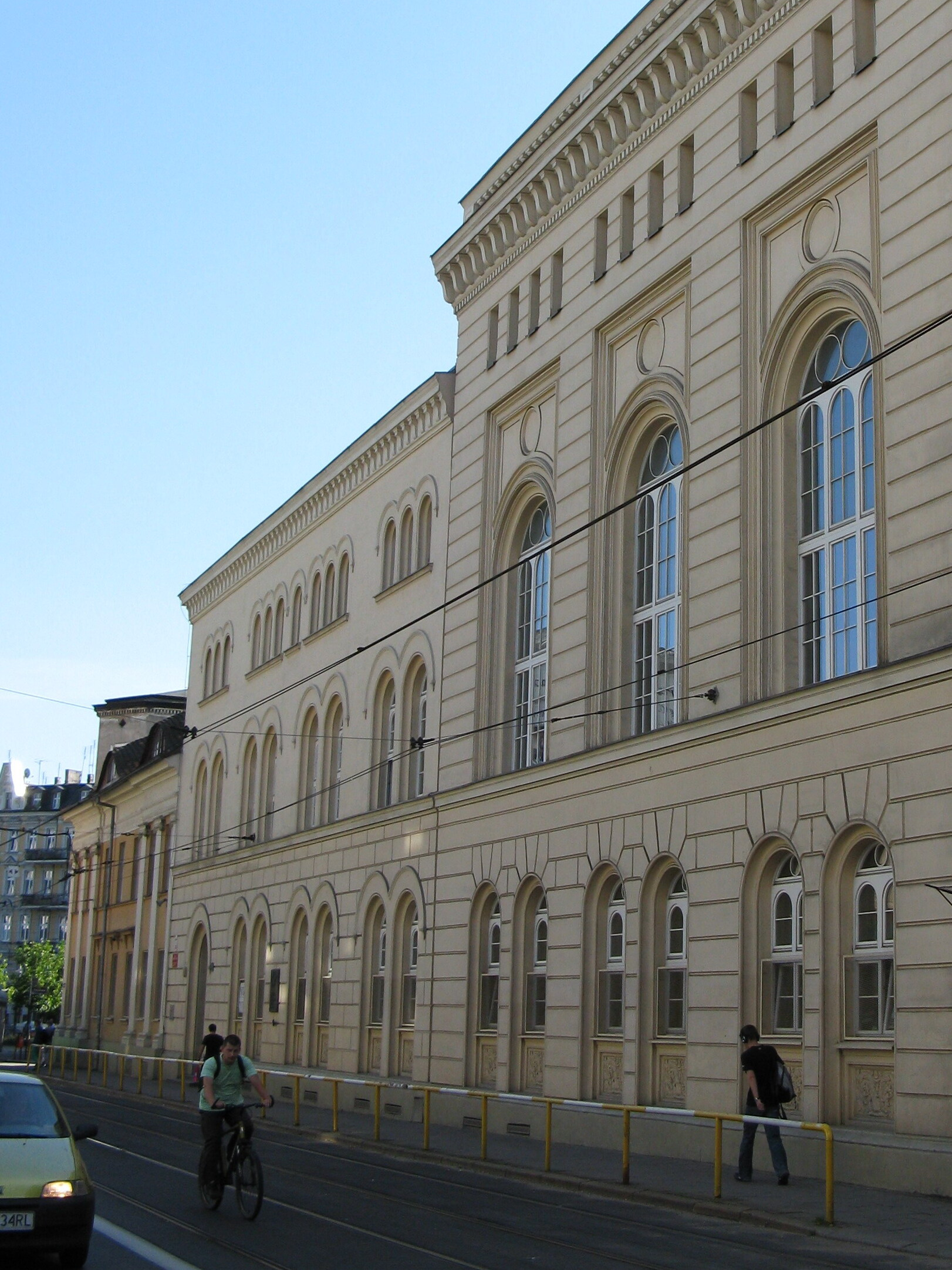
- Building of III LO

Location
- 10 Strzelecka Street, 61-845 Poznań; Poznań; Poland

Information
- Type: high school
- Patron saints: John Cantius (since 1923)
- Established: 1920
- Principal: Katarzyna Kordus

St. John Cantius School is a high school in Poznań, Poland named after the scholar and theologian St. John Cantius.

It was founded in 1920 by Gotthilf Berger, Edward Raczyński and Hipolit Cegielski, in place of the German-language high school previously known as Friedrich Wilhelm Gymnasium, in honor of Frederick III. Between 1853 and the First World War the Polish-German sections of the school were known also as the Real School and the Berger Gymnasium after G. Berger.

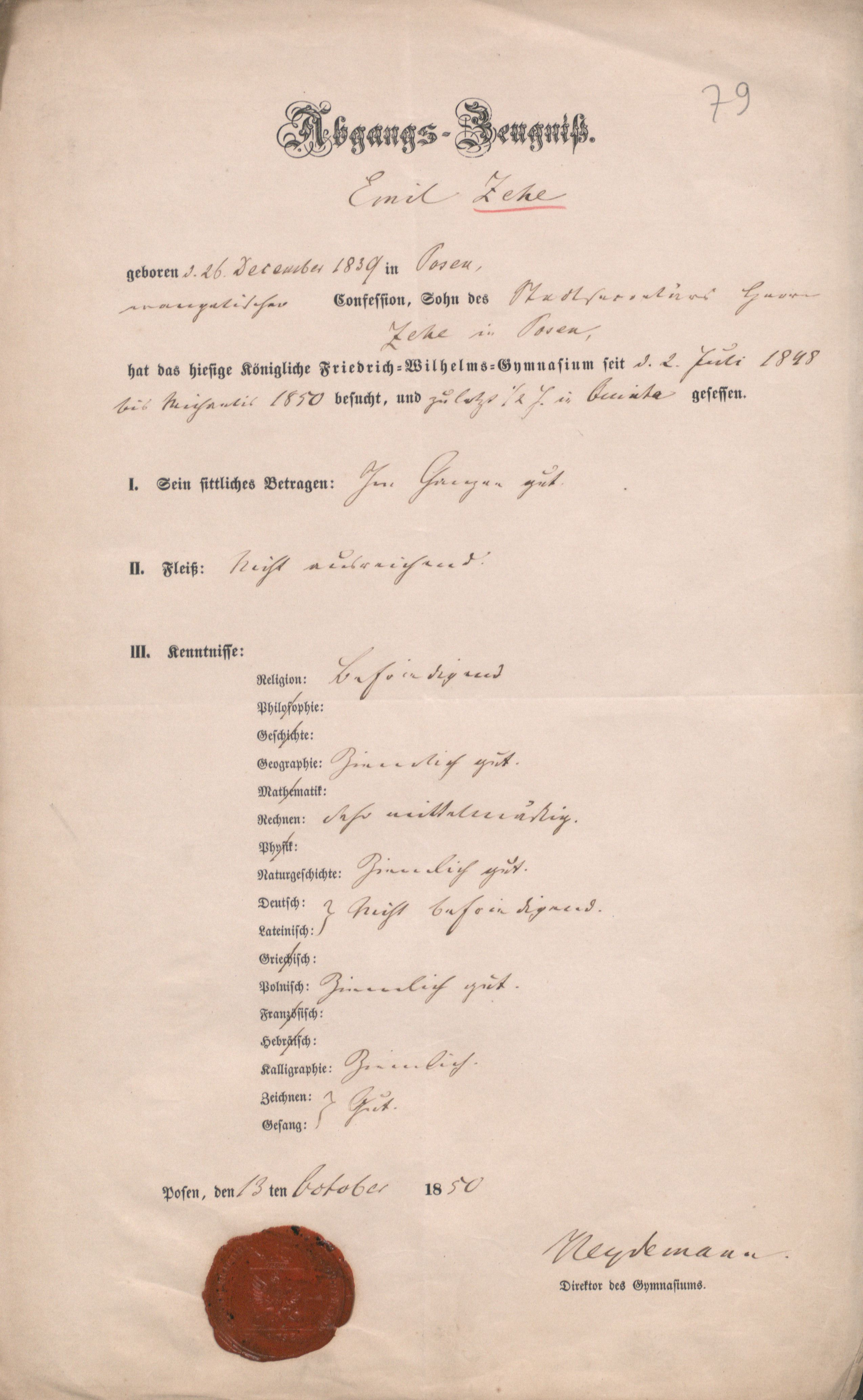
School report 1850 (source: State Archive in Poznań)

Some notable alumni include: Florian Marciniak, Władysław Niegolewski, Zbigniew Zakrzewski, Xaver Scharwenka and Zygmunt Gorgolewski. Noted faculty members included Hermann Loew and Karol Libelt.

== Sources ==
- Official site of Poznań city
- Official site of Wielkopolska
