= Zbigniew Antoni Fronczek =

Polish politician

Member of Bydgoszcz City Council
- In office 27 November 2006 – ?

Personal details
- Born: 20 February 1935 (age 91)
- Party: Civic Platform

Zbigniew Antoni Fronczek (born 20 February 1935) is a Polish politician, current Member of Bydgoszcz City Council who represents the 4th district.

On 12 November 2006 he was elected to Bydgoszcz City Council. He got 592 votes in 4th district, representing the Civic Platform list. He took office on 27 November 2006. He is a vice-chairperson of Health Policy Committee and a member of Culture and Science Committee.

In 2013, Fronczek was awarded the Officer's Cross of the Polonia Restituta.

== See also ==
- Bydgoszcz City Council
