= Zbigniew Małkowski =

Polish footballer

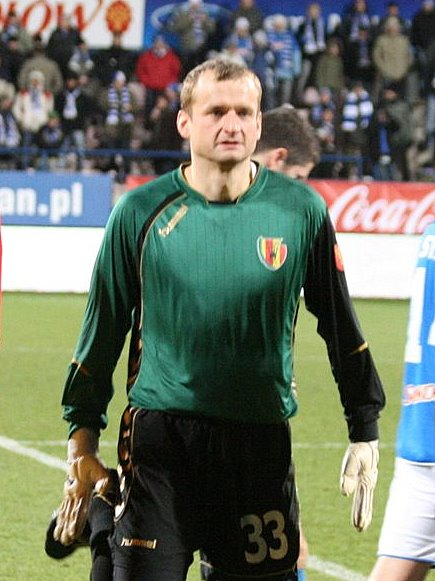

Personal information
- Date of birth: 19 January 1978 (age 48)
- Place of birth: Olsztyn, Poland
- Position: Goalkeeper

Team information
- Current team: Legia Warsaw II (goalkeeping coach)

Youth career
- Warmia Olsztyn
- Stomil Olsztyn

Senior career*
Years	Team	Apps	(Gls)
1995–2000	Stomil Olsztyn	28	(0)
2000–2005	Feyenoord	1	(0)
2001–2003	→ Excelsior (loan)	55	(0)
2005–2008	Hibernian	51	(0)
2007	→ Gretna (loan)	8	(0)
2007–2008	→ Inverness Caledonian Thistle (loan)	2	(0)
2009	OKS 1945 Olsztyn	15	(0)
2009–2016	Korona Kielce	146	(0)
2017	Zagłębie Lubin	1	(0)
2018	Widzew Łódź	0	(0)

Managerial career
- 2017–2018: Poland U16 (goalkeeping coach)
- 2017–2018: Widzew Łódź (goalkeeping coach)
- 2018–2019: Poland U17 (goalkeeping coach)
- 2018–2019: Widzew Łódź (goalkeeping coach)
- 2020–2021: Podbeskidzie (goalkeeping coach)
- 2022–2025: Stomil Olsztyn (goalkeeping coach)
- 2025–: Legia Warsaw II (goalkeeping coach)
- * Club domestic league appearances and goals

Zbigniew "Zibi" Małkowski (born 19 January 1978) is a Polish professional football coach and former player who played as a goalkeeper. He is currently the goalkeeping coach for Legia Warsaw II.

== Club career ==
=== Hibernian ===
'Zibi' first appeared for Hibernian as a trialist in a 5–0 win over St Patrick's Athletic in the 2005–06 pre-season tour of Ireland. He then made a second showing in the game 24 hours later against Shamrock Rovers. He impressed Tony Mowbray, and on returning to Edinburgh was signed on a two-year contract. After initially impressing during the first half of the 2005–06 league season, he started to make errors around the turn of the year.

Małkowski was notable for making a series of errors in derby matches against Hibs' rivals, Hearts. His first two mistakes in the 2006 Scottish Cup defeat, followed by an error leading to a Hearts equaliser in the next derby, which Hibs won 2–1. Having kept his place under Tony Mowbray during the following season, he made two bad errors in the first derby after Mowbray's departure to West Brom. Małkowski's errors resulted in a draw, in a game where they had been 2–0 up after sixteen minutes. In what proved to be Malkowski's last game for the club, he made a serious error in the next derby match, when he dropped a tame free kick by Paul Hartley into the path of Edgaras Jankauskas, who scored into the unguarded net. This led to Małkowski being dropped from the Hibernian squad entirely for the following match against Dunfermline, being replaced by Andrew McNeil.

==== Gretna ====
Having completely fallen out of favour at Hibs, Małkowski was loaned out to Scottish First Division leaders Gretna towards the end of the 2006–07 season. He replaced Alan Main, who had signed a pre-contract agreement with their promotion rivals St Johnstone. Małkowski made a positive impression at Gretna, keeping several clean sheets, including a penalty save against Dundee that preserved a 1–0 win. Małkowski's performances contributed towards Gretna's promotion to the Scottish Premier League.

==== Inverness ====
Małkowski returned to Hibs after completing his loan spell at Gretna. He was still completely out of favour at Hibs, who had signed Yves Ma-Kalambay to be their first choice goalkeeper. Małkowski played as a trialist in a match for Falkirk, who subsequently signed Tim Krul on loan from Newcastle. On 31 August 2007, he joined Inverness on a season-long loan. Małkowski made an error in his first match for Inverness against Aberdeen, which they lost 2–1.

=== Poland ===
After completing loan spells at Gretna and Inverness, Małkowski was released by Hibernian on 1 September 2008. He has since returned to Poland to continue playing his football at a lower level, with OKS 1945 Olsztyn, his first senior club.

== Honours ==
Zagłębie Lubin II

- IV liga Lower Silesia West: 2016–17
