= Zbigniew Oleśnicki (primate of Poland) =

Polish clergyman

His Excellency Zbigniew Oleśnicki
- Archbishop of Gniezno; Primate of Poland
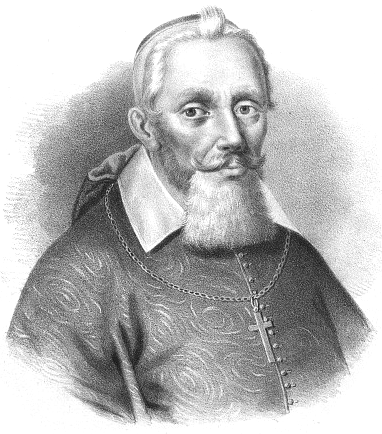
- Church: Roman Catholic
- Archdiocese: Gniezno
- Installed: 1481
- Term ended: 1492

Orders
- Consecration: 1473

Personal details
- Born: 1430
- Died: 2 February 1493 (aged 62–63) Łowicz
- Coat of arms

Zbigniew Oleśnicki (c. 1430–1493), nephew of Cardinal Zbigniew Oleśnicki, was a Roman Catholic clergyman and Polish politician. He served as crown deputy chancellor from 1472, bishop of Kuyavia from 1472, and bishop of Gniezno and primate of Poland from 12 October 1481.

He was born, about 1430, into the influential Debno noble family; he was the son of Marshal of the Kingdom of Poland Jan Oleśnicki, and the nephew of Zbigniew Cardinal Oleśnicki of Kraków

During the absence of King Casimir IV Jagiellon he was deputized in several state matters including dealing with the Old Prussians; however, by the end of Casimirs reign their relationship had soured, probably due to a rivalry with Frederick Jagiellon, the Bishop of Kraków and Casimir's son. After the death of Casimir, he was a strong supporter for the election of Janusz III of Masovia to be the new king as opposed to John I Albert.

He died on 2 February 1493 in Łowicz and was buried in the Cathedral of Gniezno, where his tomb was built with red marble by Veit Stoss.
