= Zbigniew Zakrzewski (economist) =

Polish economist

Zbigniew Zakrzewski (August 15, 1912 in Puszczykowo – August 19, 1992 in Poznań) was a Polish economist, expert of history of Poznań. He was a professor, rector, prorector and honoris causa of Poznań University of Economics. Son of Ksawery Zakrzewski, also the alumnus of St. John Cantius High School in Poznań.

Zakrzewski is an author of interior trade theory. He is also an author of books about Poznań.
