= Zbigniew Żupnik =

Polish painter

- Born: 26 May 1951; Kraków
- Died: 27 July 2000 (aged 49); Kraków
- Education: School of Fine Arts in Kraków
- Known for: Painting

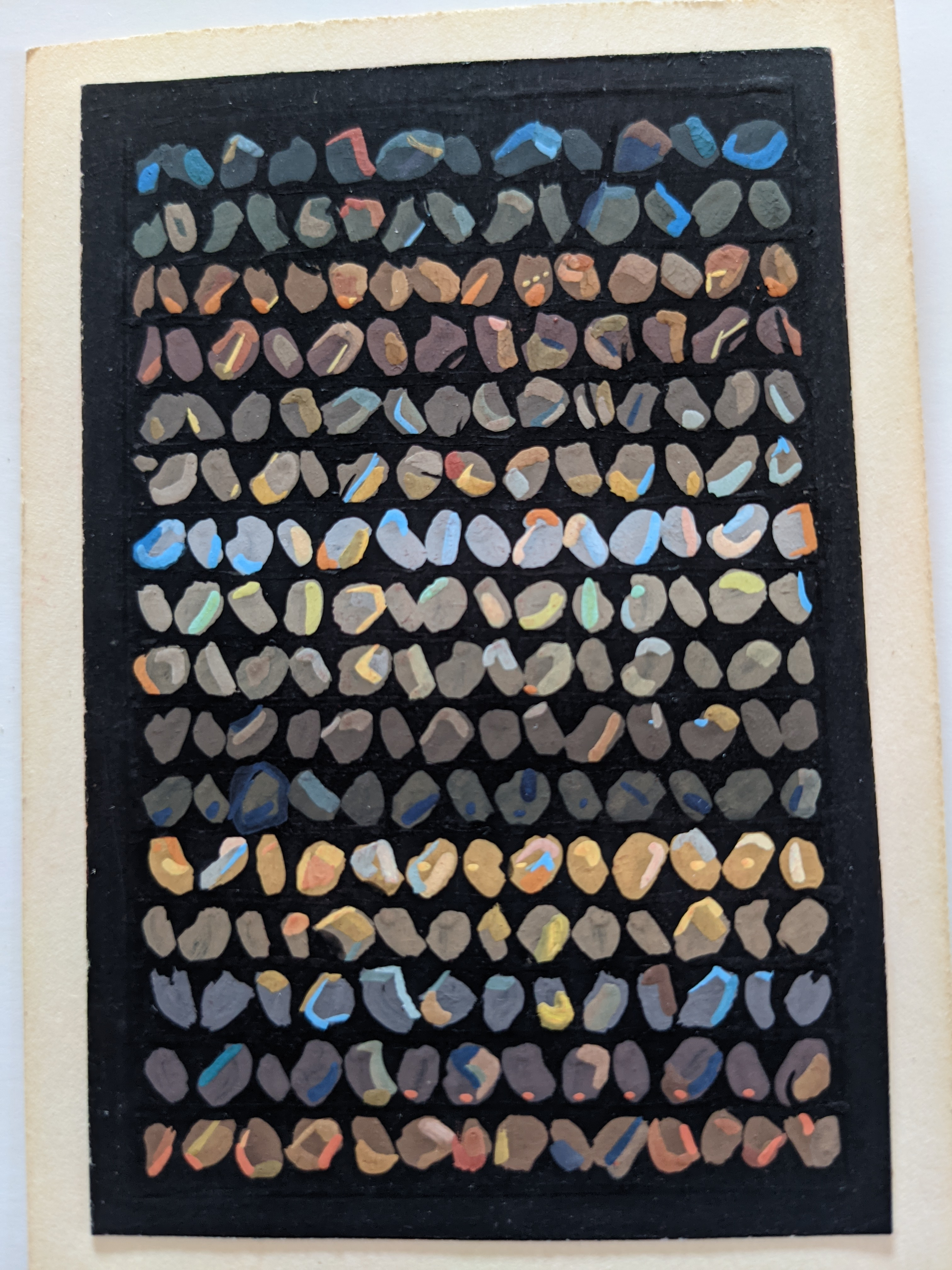

Zbigniew Żupnik (26 May 1951 – 27 July 2000) was a Polish painter. He studied at the Jan Matejko Academy of Fine Arts in Kraków where his master was Adam Marczyński. He created numerous paintings, drawings and graphics.

== Exhibitions ==
- Individual:
  - 1977 – Kraków
- Collective:
  - 1977 – Kraków, Dyplomaci II (Diplomats II)
  - 1980 – Kraków, Warsztaty (Workshops)
  - 1980 – Paryż, L'art des jeunes (Art of the Young People)
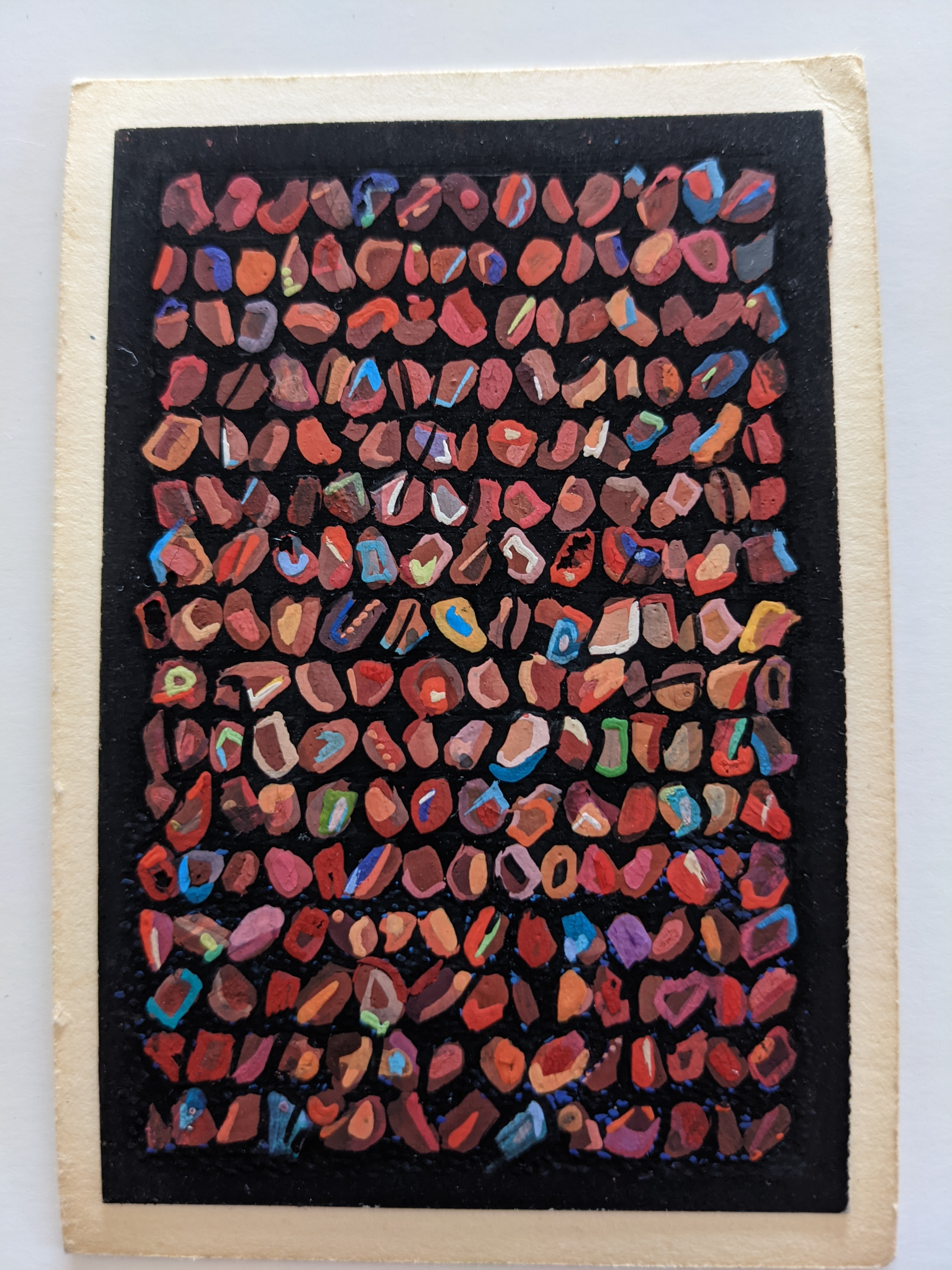
  - 1980 – Łódź, Sztuka młodych (Art of the Young People)
