= Zbigniew Zakrzewski (footballer) =

Polish footballer

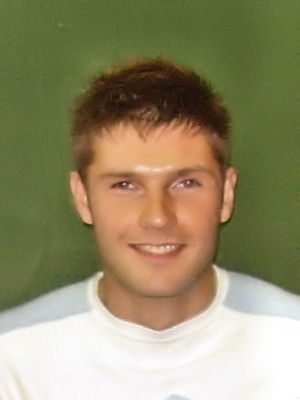
- Zbigniew Zakrzewski, 2007

Personal information
- Full name: Zbigniew Zakrzewski
- Date of birth: 26 January 1981 (age 45)
- Place of birth: Poznań, Poland
- Height: 1.84 m (6 ft 0 in)
- Position: Striker

Senior career*
Years	Team	Apps	(Gls)
2000–2001	Lech Poznań		
2001	Obra Kościan		
2002	Warta Poznań		
2002–2003	Aluminium Konin	32	(6)
2003–2007	Lech Poznań	96	(27)
2007–2009	FC Sion	13	(1)
2008	→ FC Thun (loan)	15	(1)
2008–2009	→ Arka Gdynia (loan)	23	(6)
2010	GKS Bełchatów	9	(1)
2010–2011	Warta Poznań	30	(10)
2011–2014	Miedź Legnica	76	(31)
2014–2015	Puszcza Niepołomice	10	(2)
2015–2021	Tarnovia Tarnowo Podgórne	82	(55)
2021	→ Wiara Lecha Poznań (loan)	5	(0)
Total		391	(140)
- * Club domestic league appearances and goals

Zbigniew Zakrzewski (born 26 January 1981) is a Polish former professional footballer who played as a striker. He currently works in the sports department of Lech Poznań's academy.

== Career ==
Zakrzewski made his debut as a professional player in Lech Poznań, when they played in the second division during the 2000–01 and 2001–02 seasons. In 2001, Zakrzewski moved to Obra Kościan where he played until the spring round of this season. In 2002, he moved to Warta Poznań, only to join Aluminium Konin a few months later.

In 2003, he came back to Lech Poznań, with whom he won the Polish Cup in 2004. Zakrzewski made 96 league appearances for Lech, scoring 27 goals.

In June 2007, Zakrzewski signed a four-year contract with Swiss Super League team FC Sion.

In 2008, he returned to Poland on a loan deal to Arka Gdynia. He scored four goals in his first four league games, including two against his previous club Lech Poznań.

In July 2010, Zakrzewski moved to Warta Poznań on a one-year contract.

In June 2011, he joined Miedź Legnica.

== Honours ==
Lech Poznań

- Polish Cup: 2003–04

Miedź Legnica

- II liga West: 2011–12
