= Lech (name) =

- Gender: Male
- Language: Polish
- Name day: 28 February; 12 August

Origin
- Region of origin: Poland

Other names
- Related names: Leszek, Lestko, Leszko, Lestek, Lechosław

Lech (pronounced [ˈlɛx]) is a Polish masculine given name. Lech was the name of the legendary founder of Poland. Lech also appears as a surname, with 14,289 people having the name in Poland.

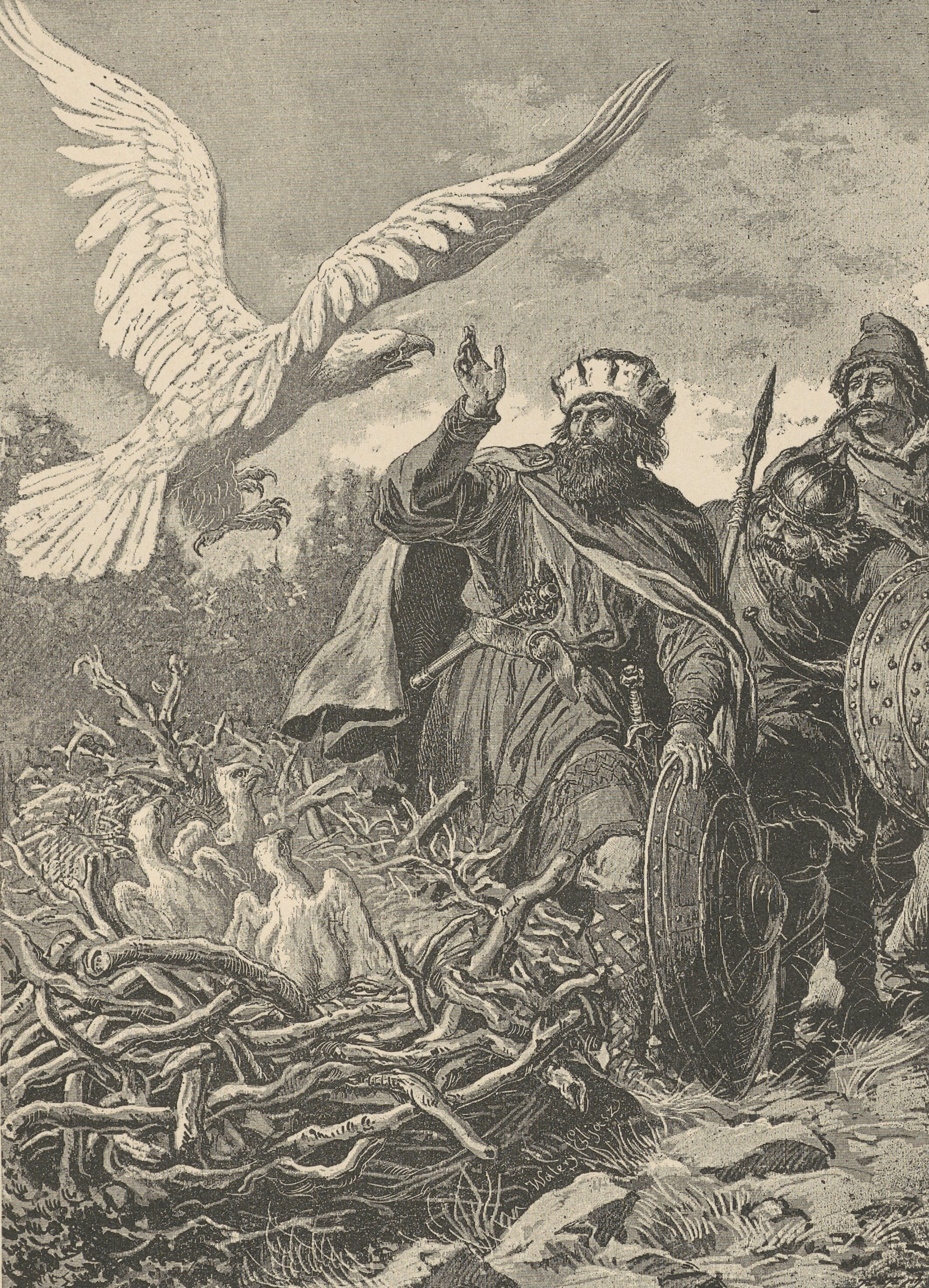
Lech and the White Eagle, as painted by Walery Eljasz Radzikowski (1841–1905)

== Given name ==
- Lech, legendary founder of Poland
- Lech II, legendary ruler of Poland and son of Krakus
- Lech Bądkowski (1920–1984), Polish writer, journalist, publicist and Kashubian-Pomeranian activist
- Lech Gardocki (born 1944), Polish lawyer, judge and former First President of the Supreme Court of Poland
- Lech Garlicki (born 1946), Polish jurist and constitutional law specialist
- Lech Janerka (born 1953), Polish songwriter, vocalist, and bassist
- Lech Jęczmyk (born 1936), Polish publicist, essayist, writer and translator
- Lech Kaczyński (1949–2010), Politician of the party Prawo i Sprawiedliwość, former President of Poland
- Lech Kołakowski (born 1963), Polish politician
- Lech Kowalski (born 1951), British-born American filmmaker
- Lech Koziejowski (born 1949), Polish fencer and Olympic gold medalist
- Lech Kuropatwiński (1947–2022), Polish politician
- Lech Łasko (born 1956), Polish volleyball player and Olympic gold medalist
- Lech Mackiewicz (born 1960), Polish actor, director and playwright
- Lech Majewski (film director) (born 1953), Polish film and theatre director, writer, poet, and painter
- Lech Ordon (1928–2017), Polish actor
- Lech Owron (1893–1965), Polish actor
- Lech Piasecki (born 1961), Polish racing cyclist
- Lech Pijanowski (1928–1974), Polish film critic, broadcaster, director, screenwriter and populiser of games
- Lech Rzewuski (1941–2004), Polish painter
- Lech Szczucki (1933–2019), Polish historian of philosophy and culture
- Lech Szymańczyk (born 1949), Polish politician
- Lech Trzeciakowski (1931–2017), Polish historian
- Lech Wałęsa (born 1943), Polish co-founder of the Solidarity movement and former President of Poland
- Lech Woszczerowicz (born 1940), Polish politician
- Lech Wyszczelski (born 1942), Polish military historian and author

== Surname ==
- Andrzej Lech (born 1946), Polish Olympic handball player
- Andrzej Jerzy Lech (born 1955), Polish artist and photographer
- Grzegorz Lech (born 1983), Polish footballer
- Joanna Lech (born 1984), Polish poet and writer
- Jacek Lech (1947–2007), Polish singer
- Michael Lech, American semi-professional poker player with 9 Circuit rings
- Piotr Lech (born 1968), Polish goalkeeper
- Leo and Alfonsia Lech, whose home was destroyed during the arrest of Robert Seacat

== See also ==
- Lach (name)
- Lech (Bohemian prince) (died 805)
- Lech (river)
- Polish name
- Slavic names
- Lech (disambiguation)
