= Leszek =

- Gender: male

Other names
- Related names: Leszko

Leszek (Polish pronunciation: [ˈlɛʂɛk]) is a Slavic Polish male given name, originally Lestko, Leszko or Lestek, related to Lech, Lechosław and Czech Lstimir.

Individuals named Leszek celebrate their name day on June 3.

Notable people bearing the name include:

- Lestek (c. 870 to 880–930 to 950), also spelled Leszek, second duke of the Polans tribe
- Leszko II, also spelled Leszek, a legendary ruler of Poland, father of Leszek III
- Leszek II the Black (1241–1288), Polish prince, Duke of Sieradz, Duke of Łęczyca, Duke of Inowrocław, Duke of Sandomierz and High Duke of Poland
- Leszek III, a legendary ruler of Poland
- Leszek, Duke of Masovia (c. 1162–1186)
- Leszek the White (1186/1187–1227), Prince of Sandomierz and High Duke of Poland
- Leszek Balcerowicz, Polish economist, former chairman of the National Bank of Poland and Deputy Prime Minister
- Leszek Bebło (born 1966), Polish long-distance runner, 1993 Paris Marathon champion
- Leszek Bednarczuk (1936–2025), Polish linguist, Indo-Europeanist, and professor
- Leszek Blanik, 2008 Olympic gymnastic gold medalist in the vault
- Leszek Borysiewicz, British academic and university administrator
- Leszek A. Gąsieniec, Professor of Computer Science at the University of Liverpool
- Leszek Kołakowski (1927–2009), Polish philosopher
- Leszek Laszkiewicz (born 1978), Polish ice hockey player and executive
- Leszek Miller, former Prime Minister of Poland
- Leszek Możdżer, Polish jazz pianist, music producer and film score composer

== See also ==
- Lech (disambiguation)
- Polish name
- Slavic names
