= General National Exhibition in Lviv =

1894 national exposition in Lviv, Poland

1894 Lviv
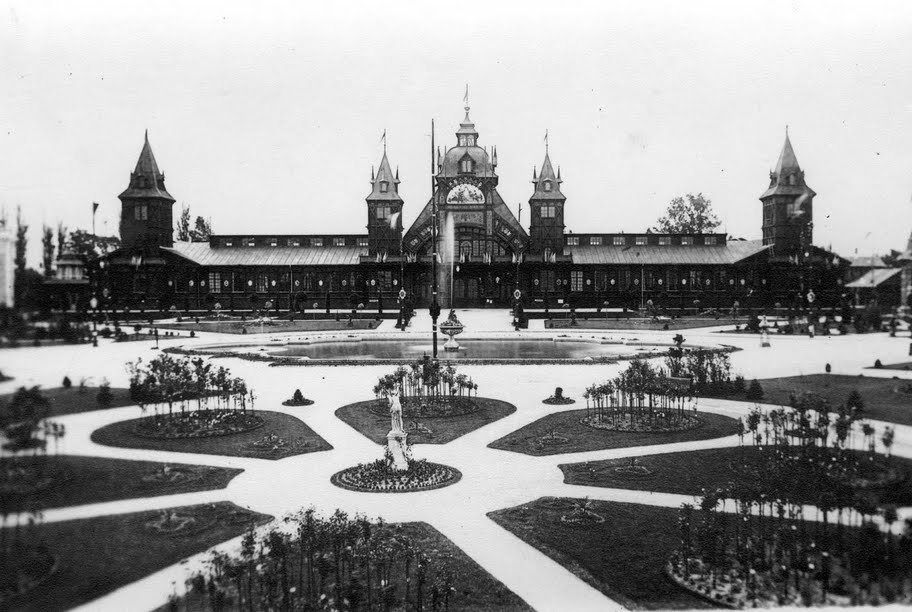
- Main pavilion

Overview
- BIE-class: National exposition
- Name: General National Exhibition in Lviv
- Area: 50 ha (120 acres)
- Visitors: ca. 1,150,000

Location
- Country: Kingdom of Galicia and Lodomeria, Austro-Hungarian Empire
- City: Lviv

Timeline
- Opening: 5 June 1894
- Closure: 15 October 1894

The General National Exhibition in Lviv (Polish: Powszechna Wystawa Krajowa we Lwowie) was a national exposition held in 1894 in the city of Lviv (Polish: Lwów) on the centenary of the Kościuszko Uprising. Its aim was to showcase the economic and cultural achievements of Galicia and to present the works of art of the Kingdom of Galicia and Lodomeria as well as all other Polish lands under foreign rule.

== History ==
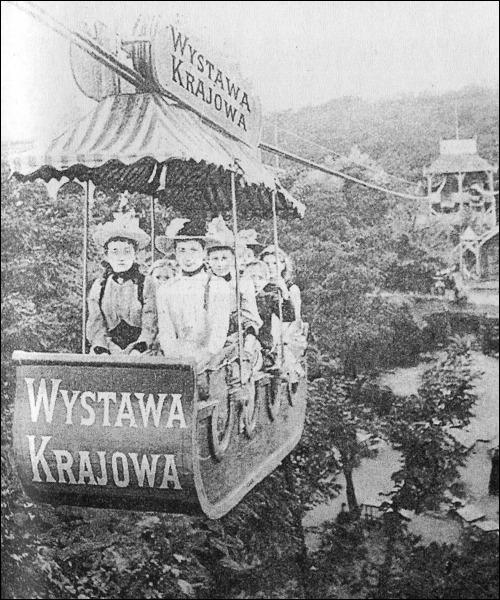
The General National Exhibition Aerial Tram, 1894

Preparations before the grand opening of the exhibition took around two years. Architects Julian Zachariewicz and Franciszek Skowron supervised the construction of the pavilions for the fair. They were assisted by Zygmunt Gorgolewski and Juliusz Hochberger. Prince Adam Sapieha was the Head of the Exhibition Committee while Zdzisław Marchwicki was appointed the Director of the Exhibition. It was held on the 100th anniversary of the Kościuszko Uprising against Tsarist Russia and was intended to present the economic progress of Galicia as well as promote the national culture and works of art from all the Polish lands under foreign partitions. The monumental cycloramic painting Racławice Panorama was created by renowned artists Wojciech Kossak and Jan Styka to celebrate this event.

The ceremonial opening of the exhibition took place on 5 June 1894 after a religious service held at Lviv's Latin Cathedral. It was attended by such notable figures as Regional Governor Prince Eustachy Sanguszko, Prince Adam Sapieha, Archduke Leopold Salvator of Austria, Archduke Karl Ludwig of Austria, Archbishops Seweryn Morawski, Sylvester Sembratovych and Izaak Mikolaj Isakowicz. The fair lasted over four months and attracted more than 1.1 million visitors, which was ten times the number of the city's inhabitants at the time. The exhibition included 129 pavilions subdivided into 33 major departments devoted to such fields as industry, science and technology, economy, arts, ethnograpny and agriculture. The site was located on an area of 50 hectares near Stryj Park (Polish: Park Stryjeński). The most distinguished guest at the event was Emperor Franz Joseph I of Austria.

During the exhibition, a number of conferences were held and an electric tram line was launched connecting the main Lviv Railway Station and the city center with the fair grounds. Later, the line became an integral part of the city and the trams in Lviv remain a popular means of transport today. Another notable event was the inauguration of the first aerial tramway in partitioned Poland. The 170-meter long line was installed to help the visitors move around the fair grounds more easily. It was dismantled after the exhibition closed. One of the most popular attractions located at the exhibition site was the electric musical fountain illuminated with colored lamps erected on the exhibition's main square and designed by Czech engineer František Křižík. The General National Exhibition in Lviv was also notable for having been the birthplace of modern football in Poland and Ukraine. On 14 July 1894, the first recorded football match was held between members of the Polish Sokół clubs from Lviv and Kraków with Włodzimierz Chomicki scoring the first ever goal in the history of football in Poland.

Among the few preserved buildings from the exhibition is the Palace of Arts (Polish: Pałac sztuki). Situated in Stryj Park, it was designed by Polish architect Franciszek Skowron in the Baroque Revival architectural style. It features an allegorical sculpture representing Art created by Julian Markowski. Figures representing Sculpture and Painting were located on both sides of the entrance to the palace and were executed by Antoni Popiel. The pavilion housed three exhibitions: A Retrospective of Polish Art, The Antiques Exhibition, and The Exhibition of Contemporary Art.

The exhibition also hosted a retrospective of Polish painting from all three partitions, which was organized by professors Marian Sokołowski and Jan Bołoz-Antoniewicz. It featured works by such artists as Szymon Czechowicz, Franciszek Smuglewicz, Tadeusz Kuntze, Jan Piotr Norblin, Zygmunt Vogel, Aleksander Orłowski, Jan Nepomucen Głowacki, Marcin Zaleski and Piotr Michałowski.

== Significance ==
It was the biggest fair in the history of the city and greatly contributed to its further modernization and the initiation of numerous other infrastructure projects. The staging of the exhibition, which was also seen as a demonstration of the patriotic feelings of Polish people, was made possible thanks to the cultural autonomy enjoyed by Galicia within the multi-national Austro-Hungarian Empire. After the regaining of independence by Poland in 1918, the fair grounds were used for hosting the annual Eastern Trade Fairs (Polish: Targi Wschodnie) launched for the first time in 1921.

== Main pavilions ==
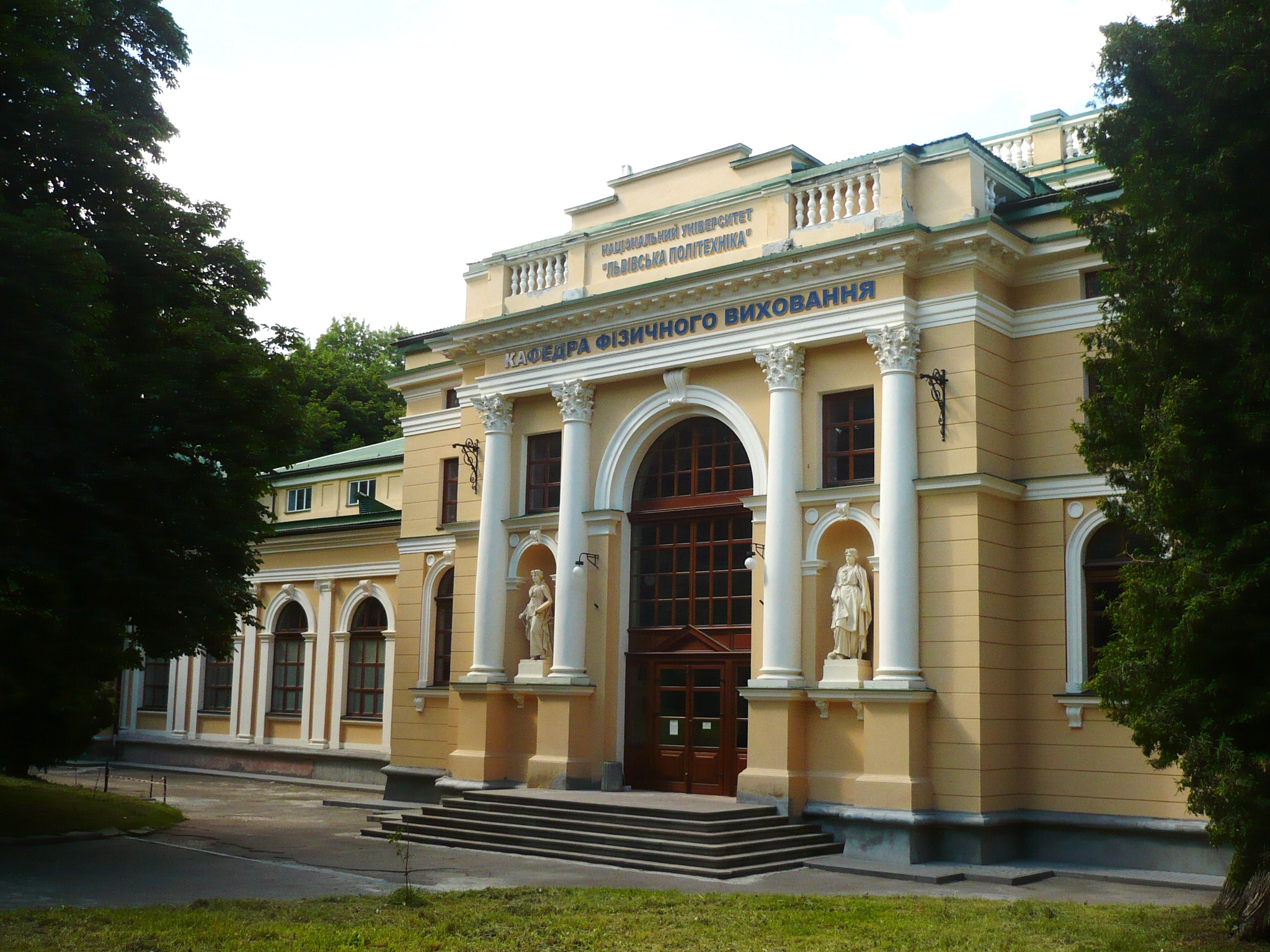
The Palace of Arts

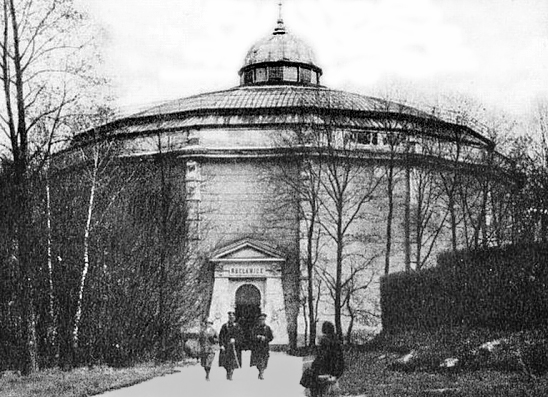
The Racławice Panorama Pavilion

Notable pavilions and structures constructed for the exhibition included:

- Main Gate (Brama główna)
- Gródecka Street Gate (Brama u wylotu ulicy Gródeckiej)
- Hutsul Tserkva (Cerkiew huculska)
- The Manor House (Dwór szlachecki)
- The Ethnographic Department (Dział etnograficzny)
- Electric Fountain of Lights (Elektryczna fontanna świetlna)
- The Concert Hall (Hala koncertowa)
- The Machine Hall (Hala maszyn)
- The Palace of Arts (Pałac Sztuki)
- The Architecture Pavilion (Pawilon architektury)
- The Imperial Pavilion (Pawilon cesarski)
- The Count Roman Potocki Pavilion (Pawilon dóbr hr. Romana Potockiego)
- The Jan Matejko Pavilion (Pawilon Jana Matejki)
- The City of Lviv Pavilion (Pawilon miasta Lwowa)
- The Ministry of the Treasury Pavilion (Pawilon Ministerstwa Skarbu)
- The Horticultural Pavilion (Pawilon ogrodnictwa)
- The Racławice Panorama Pavilion (Pawilon Panoramy Racławickiej)
- The Industrial Pavilion (Pawilon przemysłu)
- The Ukrainian Societies Pavilion (Pawilon towarzystw ukraińskich)
- The Water Tower (Wieża wodna)

== Gallery ==
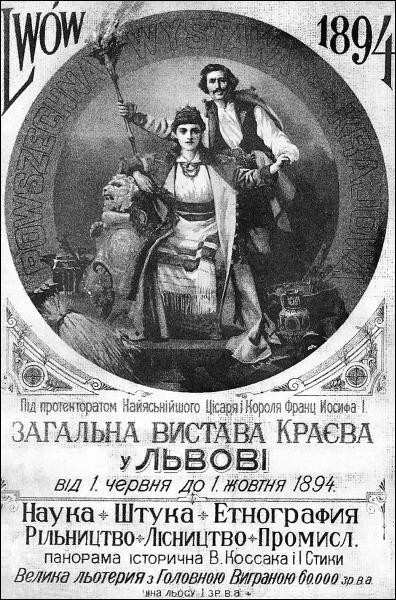
Poster of the National Exhibition in Lviv in 1894

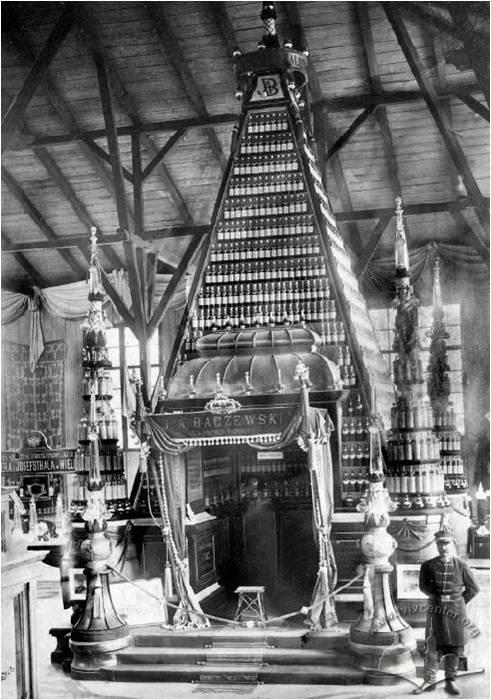
Baczewski Distillery Pavilion

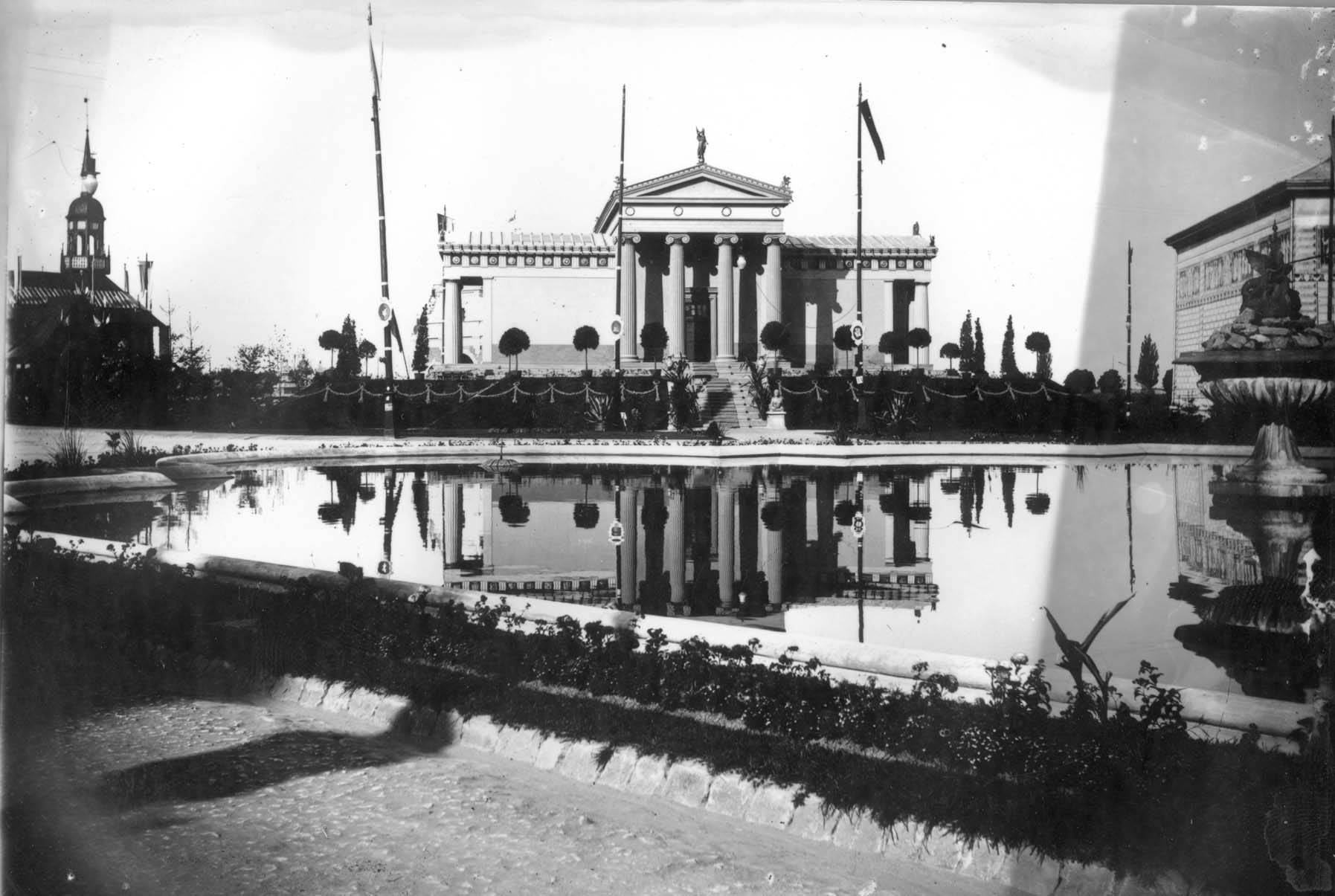
The Architecture Pavilion

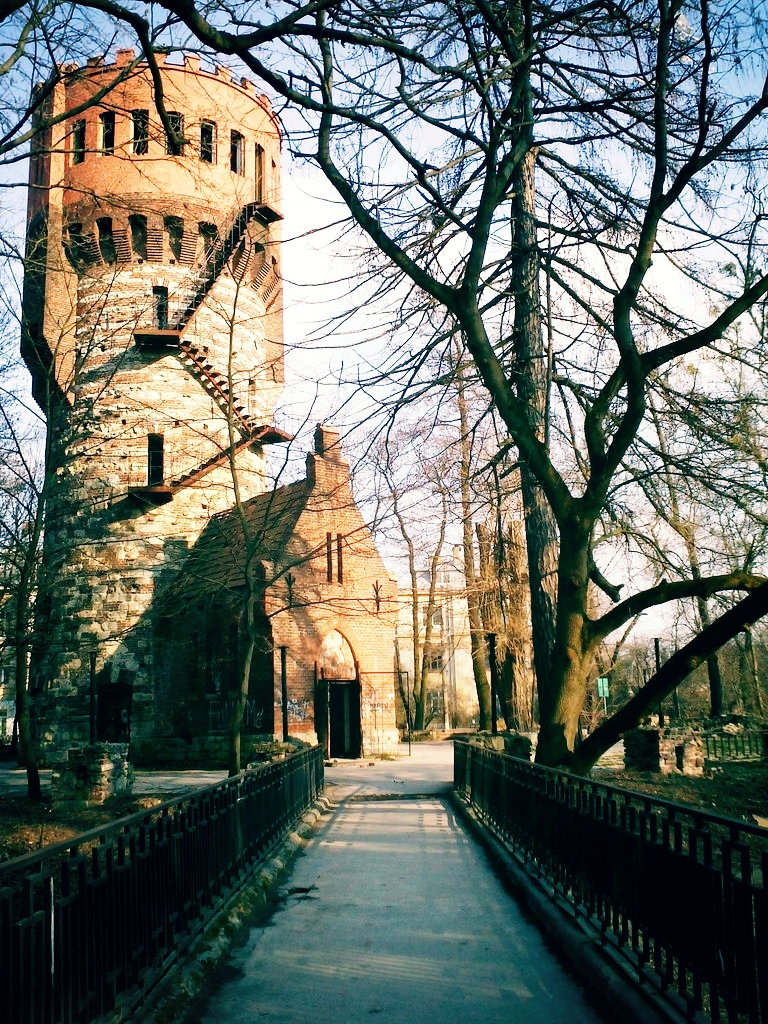
Water tower

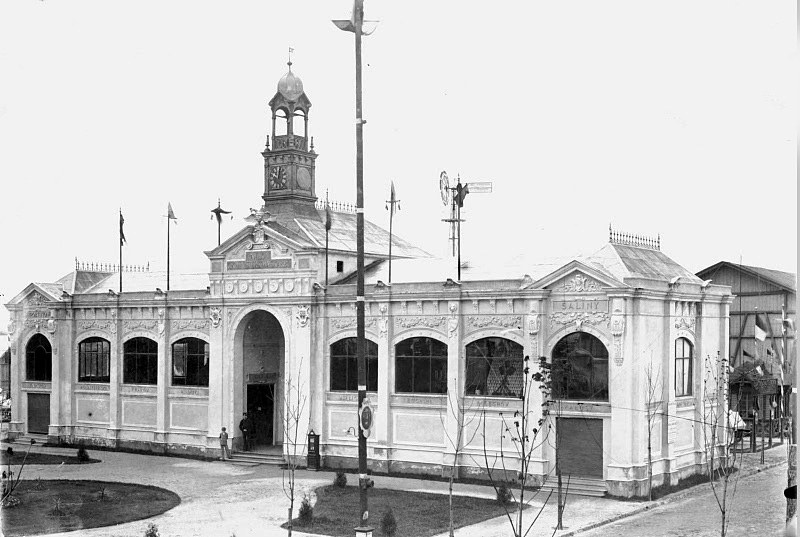
Pavilion of the Ministry of Treasury

== See also ==
- History of Poland (1795–1918)
- History of Lviv
- Poznań International Fair
- St. Dominic's Fair
- Targi Wschodnie
- Targi Północne
