= Eastern Trade Fair =

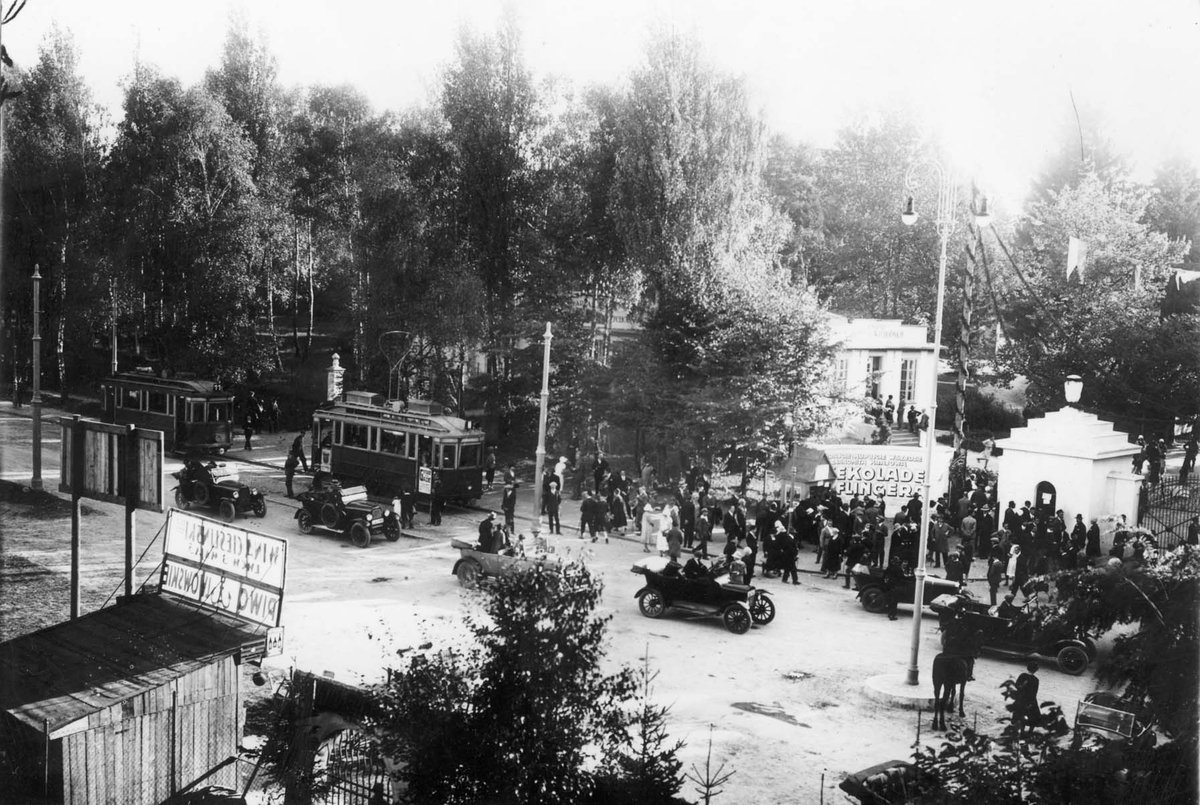
Eastern Trade Fair (Targi Wschodnie), main entrance

The Eastern Trade Fair (Polish: Targi Wschodnie (Polish pronunciation: [ˈtarɡʲi ˈfsxɔdɲɛ]) was a major trade fair in interbellum Poland.

== History ==
It was established in 1921 in Lwów (now Lviv, Ukraine) right after the end of hostilities there; designed to facilitate new business partnerships from within Poland but also with Greater Romania, Hungary and the Soviet Union among other places. The geographic location near the border with several foreign countries gave it an important role in stimulating international trade and fostering Poland's economic development.

The Eastern Trade Fair was held in Lwów's most attractive city park, called Stryj Park (Park Stryjski in Polish), where the famous Racławice Panorama was exhibited during the General National Exhibition of 1894, next to the newly built Palace of Art (now an indoor swimming pool). Some 130 new pavilions were erected in 1921 from designs by Eugeniusz Czerwiński and Alfred Zachariewicz. The annual trade fair was held there 18 times before the invasion.

== Highlights ==
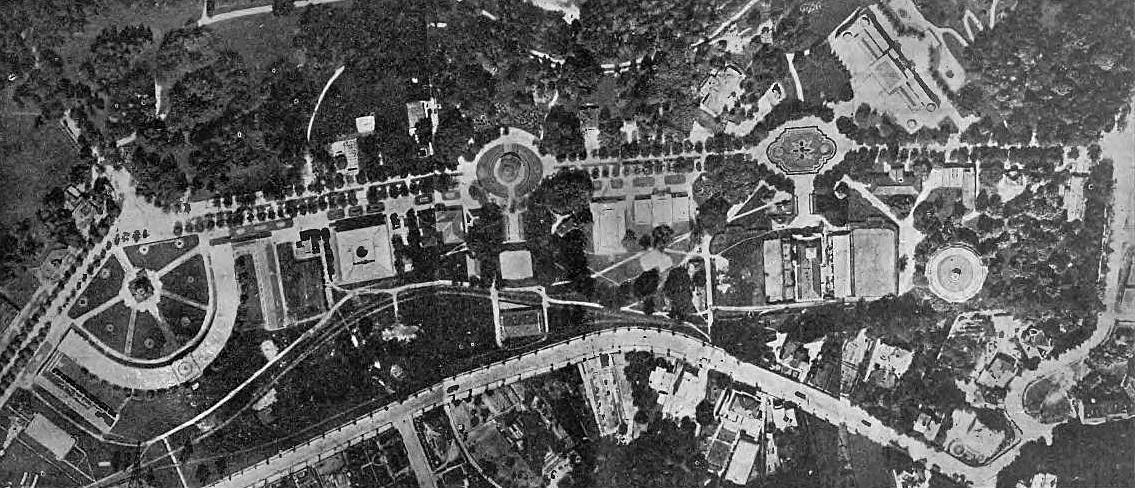
Aerial view of the Eastern Trade Fair (1936)

The opening ceremony of the first Eastern Trade Fair held on September 25, 1921, was marred by the failed attempt by a Ukrainian extremist, Stepan Fedak, to assassinate Poland's Chief of State, Józef Piłsudski. While Piłsudski dodged the bullets, the Lwów Province Governor, Kazimierz Grabowski, was wounded.

By 1928, the Fair could boast some 1,600 exhibitors, about 400 being foreign firms. That year, the event attracted 150,000 visitors. The exhibition grounds comprised some 220,000 square metres (2,400,000 sq ft), with 46 pavilions and other buildings of some 20,000 m^{2} (220,000 sq ft) of total exhibit space, as well as some 15,000 m^{2} (160,000 sq ft) of outdoor show areas.

The fairground had its own rail siding with freight station and warehouses, a customs area and customs office, a telephone exchange and post office, and tram connections to the city. The last fair took place in 1938. The next event was going to take place between September 2, and September 12, 1939, but was shortened after one week because of joint Nazi and Soviet attack on Poland.

== See also ==
- General National Exhibition in Lviv
- Poznań International Fair
- Targi Północne
- Polish culture in the Interbellum
