= Lech =

Lech is an English word referring to lecherous behavior or person.

Lech may also refer to:

== People ==
- Lech (name), a name of Polish origin
- Lech, the figure from the legendary Lech, Czech, and Rus
- Lech (Bohemian prince) (d. 805), medieval Slavic tribal ruler

== Places ==
- Lech (river) in Austria and Germany
- Lech am Arlberg, a village and noble ski resort in Vorarlberg, Austria
- Lechia, an ancient name of Poland

== Products and organizations ==
- Lech (beer), Polish beer produced by Kompania Piwowarska, in Poznań
- Lech Poznań, football club in Poznań
- Lech Poznań II, the reserve team of Lech Poznań
- Lech Rypin, football club in Rypin
- Lech (airship), the first Polish zeppelin
- Lech (motorcycle), defunct Polish motorcycle manufacturer

== Oher uses ==
- "Lech", a song by Slipknot from .5: The Gray Chapter
- Lech Coaster, a roller coaster in Poland

== See also ==
- Lech-Lecha, the third weekly Torah portion
- Lechia (disambiguation)
- Leck (disambiguation)
