= Poznań International Fair =

Industrial fair in Poland

Coordinates: 52°24′13″N 16°54′32″E

Międzynarodowe Targi Poznańskie
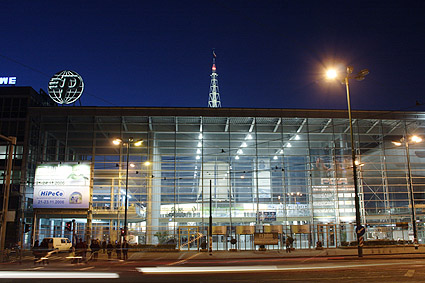
- East Hall – main entrance
- Type: Public company
- Founded: 1921
- Headquarters: Poznań, Poland
- Key people: Tomasz Kobierski (Chairman); Elżbieta Roeske (Vice-Chairman)
- Revenue: 20 000 000+ (2009)
- Total assets: 42 310 200 (2009)
- Number of employees: 490 (2010)
- Website: mtp.pl/en/

The Poznań International Fair (PIF, Polish: Międzynarodowe Targi Poznańskie, MTP) is the biggest industrial fair in Poland. It is held on the Poznań fairground in Poland. Poznań International Fair is located in the centre of the city opposite the main railway station – Poznań Główny, in the centre of Poland and in the centre of Europe.

Typically, there are about 13,200 exhibitors including about 3,000 foreign companies from 70 countries of the world participating in 80 trade fair events organized on the grounds of the Poznań fair.

The Poznań-based fair owns the largest exhibition and conference infrastructure in Poland, including 16 high standard air-conditioned halls with a large exhibition area (over 110,000 square metres (1,200,000 sq ft) in exhibition halls and almost 35,000 square metres (380,000 sq ft) on open grounds) and 81 modern conference rooms.

== History ==
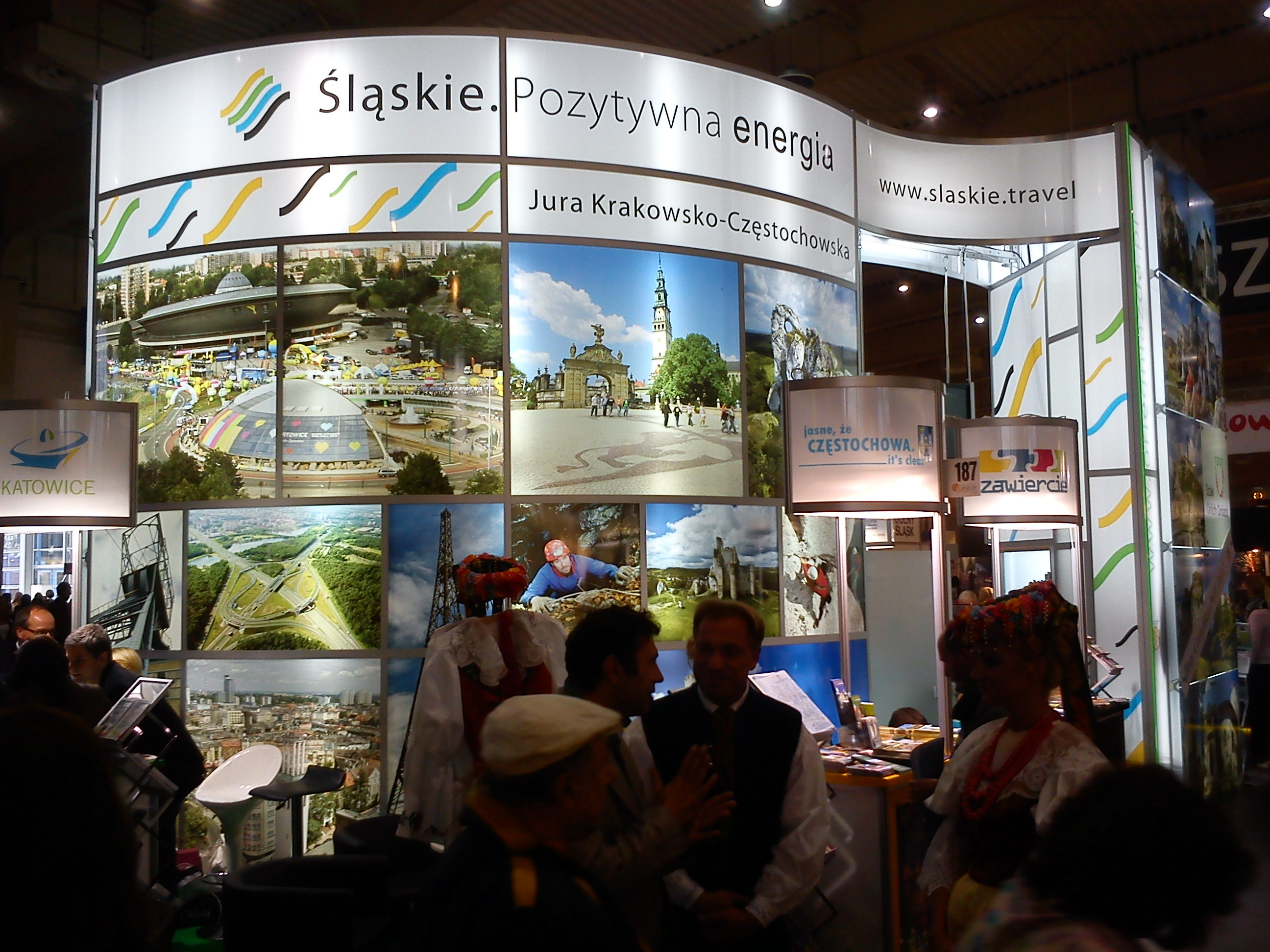
The 2012 Poznań International Fair

The idea of organising a modern fair by Polish manufacturers and merchants had its origins during the congress of the Union of Merchant Associations held in Poznań in 1917. The Union was an organisation of Polish merchants from Greater Poland and Eastern Pomerania. The fair was required to be of an international character and organised like the Leipzig Trade Fair. The first Poznań Trade Fair (I Targ Poznański), as it was called, took place in 1921 (from 28 May till 5 June), and the first chairman was Mieczysław Krzyżankiewicz. Before 1924, only Polish companies, companies from Free City of Gdańsk and foreign companies with branches in Poland which were represented by Polish citizens could participate. During 1924, agreements were signed with companies from Czechoslovakia, France, Yugoslavia, Latvia, Germany, Romania, Switzerland, and Sweden, so that the first really international fair took place in 1925. In 1927 the PIF was accepted as a member of the UFI.

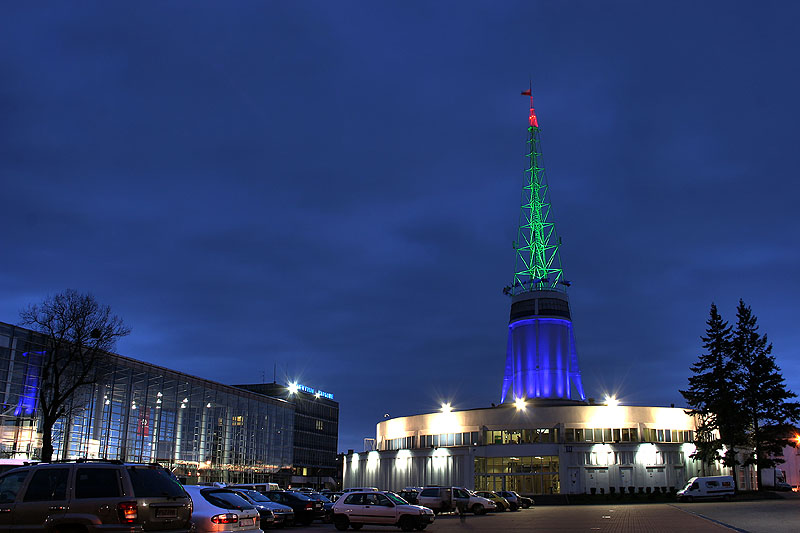
View at the Iglica (Hall 11)

The intensive developments of the 1920s were crowned by the huge General National Exhibition (Polish: Powszechna Wystawa Krajowa, PWK, PeWuKa) of 1929 that was visited by 4,5 mln people. This was the year that the Great Depression began. Despite the difficult economic situation, the PIF survived and at the end of the interbellum it was one of largest companies of its kind in Europe. During World War II, the company ceased to exist, its infrastructure was confiscated, and turned into a factory of Focke-Wulf, which made the PIF a military target for the Allied air forces. This led to great destruction of its infrastructure in 1945. During the war 85% of the PIF was destroyed, but despite this damage, the first postwar exhibition took place in 1946 and one year later, in 1947, the PIF had already regained its international character. In 1990 the Poznań International Fair transformed into a limited liability company with the State Treasure as one of its shareholders Since then the PIF is continuing to expand and enlarge its exhibition space.

== Poznań International Fair today ==
Today the PIF is the largest trade fair organizer in Poland (by over 50% of total exhibition area and over 60% of exhibitors). It is the 21st largest fair in the world, with about 50 trade events taking place on its area every year. Area of PIF is over 110,000 m^{2} (1,200,000 sq ft) indoor and 35,000 m^{2} (380,000 sq ft) outdoor exhibition space. PIF a is state-owned company – 60% of shares belong to Polish State Treasury, and 40% to the City of Poznań. MTP organises expositions of Polish leaders at over 50 renowned trade shows and exhibitions abroad in such countries as: Germany, Russia, Ukraine, Georgia, Czech Republic, Croatia, Bulgaria, Romania, Uzbekistan, Kazakhstan and Azerbaijan.

MTP has foreign representative offices all over the world. The World Expo Company is an official representative office of MTP Group in Ukraine and works on such exhibitions as Budma and other. Every year, MTP organises over 1,600 congresses, conferences and workshops and hosts about 100,000 participants at these events.

== List of annual exhibitions organized by the PIF ==
PIF highlights

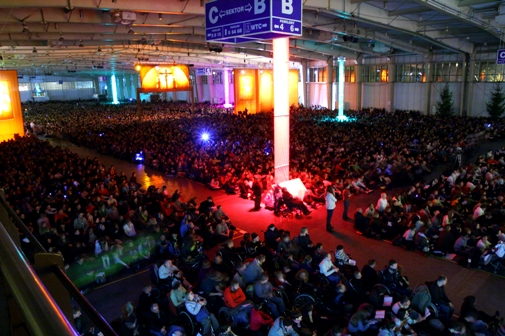
Between 29 December 2009 and 2 January 2010, Poznań International Fair – Międzynarodowe Targi Poznańskie (MTP) hosted participants of Taizé's 32nd European Meeting for Young Adults

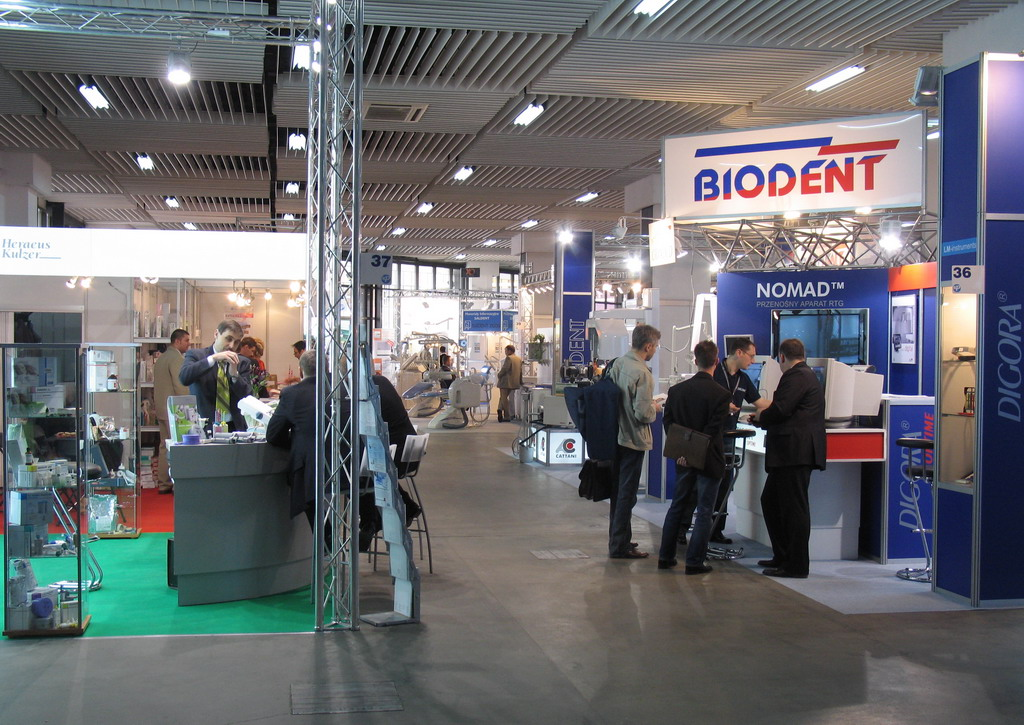
Saldent 2006

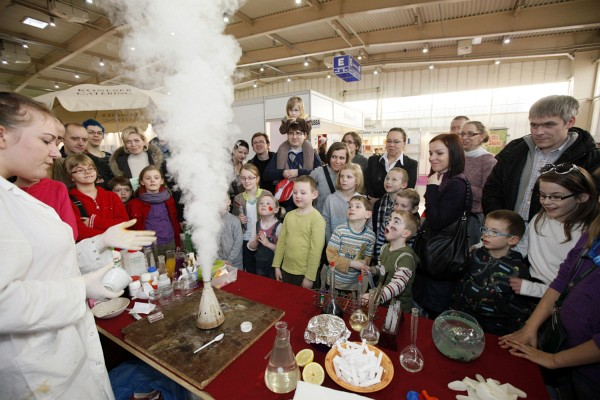
Education Fair 2010

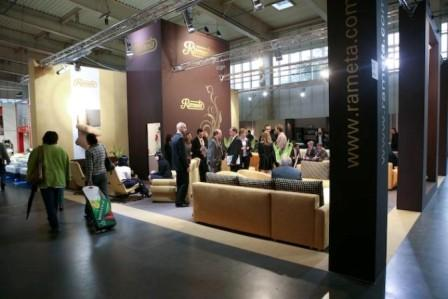
Education Fair 2010

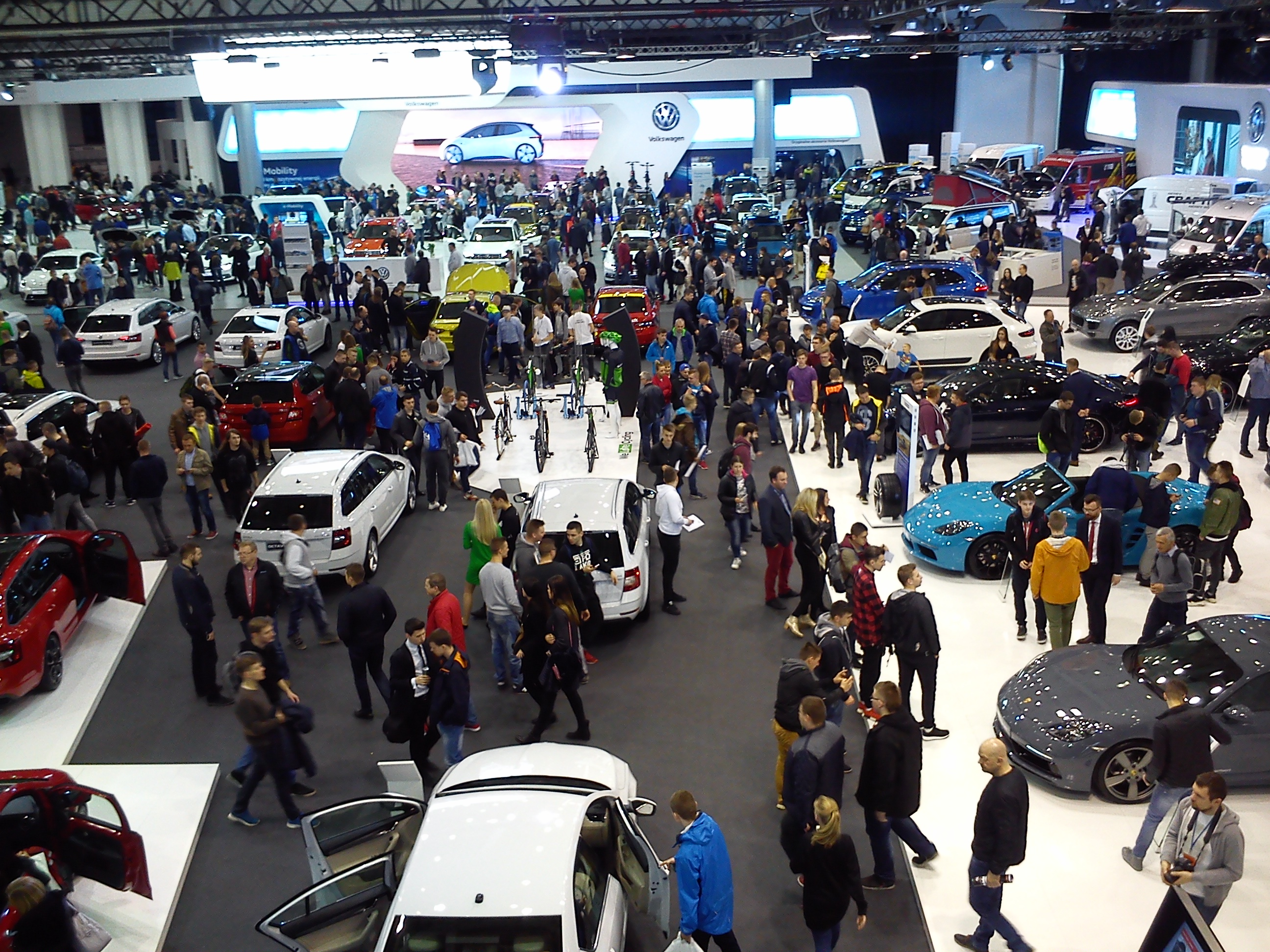
2017 Poznań Motor Show

- Polagra AGRO-PREMIERY – International Trade Fair of Agricultural Mechanization
- AQUA-SAN – Bathroom and Wellness Exhibition
- BAKEPOL – Trade Fair for the Bakery Industry in Kielce
- Bezpieczeństwo Pracy w Przemyśle – Work Safety in Industry Exhibition
- Biuro – Fair of Office Furniture and Furnishing
- Body Style – Exhibition of Lingerie and Beach Fashion
- Budma – International Construction Fair
- Bumasz – International Fair for Construction Machines, Tools and Equipment
- BuyPoland – workshop for the tourism industry
- Dodatki do żywności – International Food Ingredients Show
- Home Decor – Exhibition of textiles, table and kitchen, light, interior design
- Drema – International Trade Fair of Machines and Tools for the Wood and Furniture Industries
- Targi Edukacyjne – Education Fair
- Energia – Power Industry Exhibition
- Eurofoto – Trade Fair of Photographic Products and Services
- Expopower – Power Industry Fair
- Farma – International Trade Fair of Animal Breeding, Horticulture and Rural Development
- Poznańskie Dni Mody – Fair of Clothing and Fabrics
- Festiwal Przedmiotów Artystycznych – Festival of Artistic Objects
- FIT-EXPO – Fair of Fitness and Body & Fashion
- Furnica – Trade Fair of Components for Furniture Production
- FurniFab – Furniture Fabric Show – Supply Show for the Upholstered Furniture Industry
- Gardenia – Garden Trade Fair
- Wiosenna Giełda Turystyczna – Spring Tourist Market
- Euro-Reklama GIFT EXPO – International Trade Fair of Advertising Goods and Services
- HiPeCo – International Trade Fair for Hygiene and Pest Control
- HOBBY – Salon Modelarstwa – Show of modellers
- Infosystem – Fair of IT Solution for industry and administration
- Instalacje – International Trade Fair for Installations and Equipment
- Intermasz – International Trade Fair of Textile, Clothes and Shoemaking Machines
- Investfield – Property and Investment Salon
- Gastro-Invest-Hotel – Exhibition of Products and Services for the Hotel and Catering Industry
- Targi Książki – Poznań Fair for Books for Children and Young People
- KWO – National Horticultural Exhibition
- KWZH – National Animal Breeding Exhibition
- Look – Hairdressing and Cosmetics Forum
- Mach-Tool – Machine Tools Exhibition
- Meble – Fair of Furniture and Furnishing
- Metalforum – Exhibition of Metallugrical, Foundry Engineering and Metallurgy Industry
- Motoryzacja – TTM – Automotive Technology Fair
- NA RYBY – Angling Equipment Trade Fair
- Natura Sanat – International Health Resort and Tourism Trade Fair in Polanica-Zdrój
- Nauka dla gospodarki – Exhibition Science for the Economy
- Next Season – Fair of long-term contracts
- Poznański Salon Optyczny – Optical Salon
- Euro-Reklama OUTDOOR EXPO – International Trade Fair of Advertising Goods and Services
- Pakfood – Fair of Packaging for Food Industry
- PGA – Game Arena – Exhibition of video and computer games
- Polagra-Food – International Trade Fair for the Foodstuffs and Gastronomy
- Polagra-Tech – International Trade Fair of Food Processing Technologies Polagra-Tech
- Poleko – International Ecological Fair
- Poligrafia – International Fair of Printing Machines, Materials and Services
- Poznańskie Spotkanai Motoryyzacyjne – Automotive Industry Meetings
- Roltechnika – Exhibition of Agricultural Machines and Equipment – (takes place in Bierkowice city quarter of Opole)
- Saldent – International Dentistry Fair
- SALMED – International Trade Fair of Medical Equipment
- Salus – Prevention and Health Care Forum and Exhibition
- Sawo – International Fair of Work Protection, Rescue and Fire-Fighting
- Securex – International Security Exhibition
- Targi Obuwia, Skóry i Wyrobów Skórzanych – Fair of Shoes, Leather and Leather goods
- Surfex – Exhibition of Surface Treatment Technologies
- Świat Dziecka – Trade Fair of Goods for Children
- Taropak – International Packaging Technology and Logistics Exhibition
- TECHNOGAZ – Petroleum and Gas Salon
- ITM – POLAND – Exhibition Innovations-Technologies-Machines
- Tour Salon – Fair of Regions and Tourist Products
- Translog – Fair of Logistic, Transport and Shipping
- LTS Transporta – Exhibition of Logistics, Transport and Shipping
- Targi Upominków i Dekoracji Światecznych – Gifts and Ornaments Trade Fair
- Welding – Exhibition of Welding Technologies

== Notable architects of PIF buildings ==
- Hans Poelzig
- Roger Sławski
- Stefan Cybichowski

== See also ==
- 2008 United Nations Climate Change Conference
- Katowice International Fair, another large trade fair in Poland
- General National Exhibition in Lviv
- St. Dominic's Fair
- Targi Wschodnie
- Targi Północne
- Saint John's Fair, Poznań

== Bibliography ==
- Jerzy Topolski, Lech Trzeciakowski (red) Dzieje Poznania, tom II cz. 1 1793–1918, Warszawa-Poznań 1994, Państwowe Wydawnictwo Naukowe ISBN 83-01-11393-6
- Jerzy Topolski, Lech Trzeciakowski (red) Dzieje Poznania, tom II cz. 2 1918–1945, Warszawa-Poznań 1998, Państwowe Wydawnictwo Naukowe ISBN 83-01-12401-6
- Zbigniew Zakrzewski, Przechadzki po Poznaniu lat miedzywojennych wyd. II, Warszawa-Poznań 1983, Państwowe Wydawnictwo Naukowe, ISBN 83-01-04696-1
