= Włodzimierz Chomicki =

Polish footballer

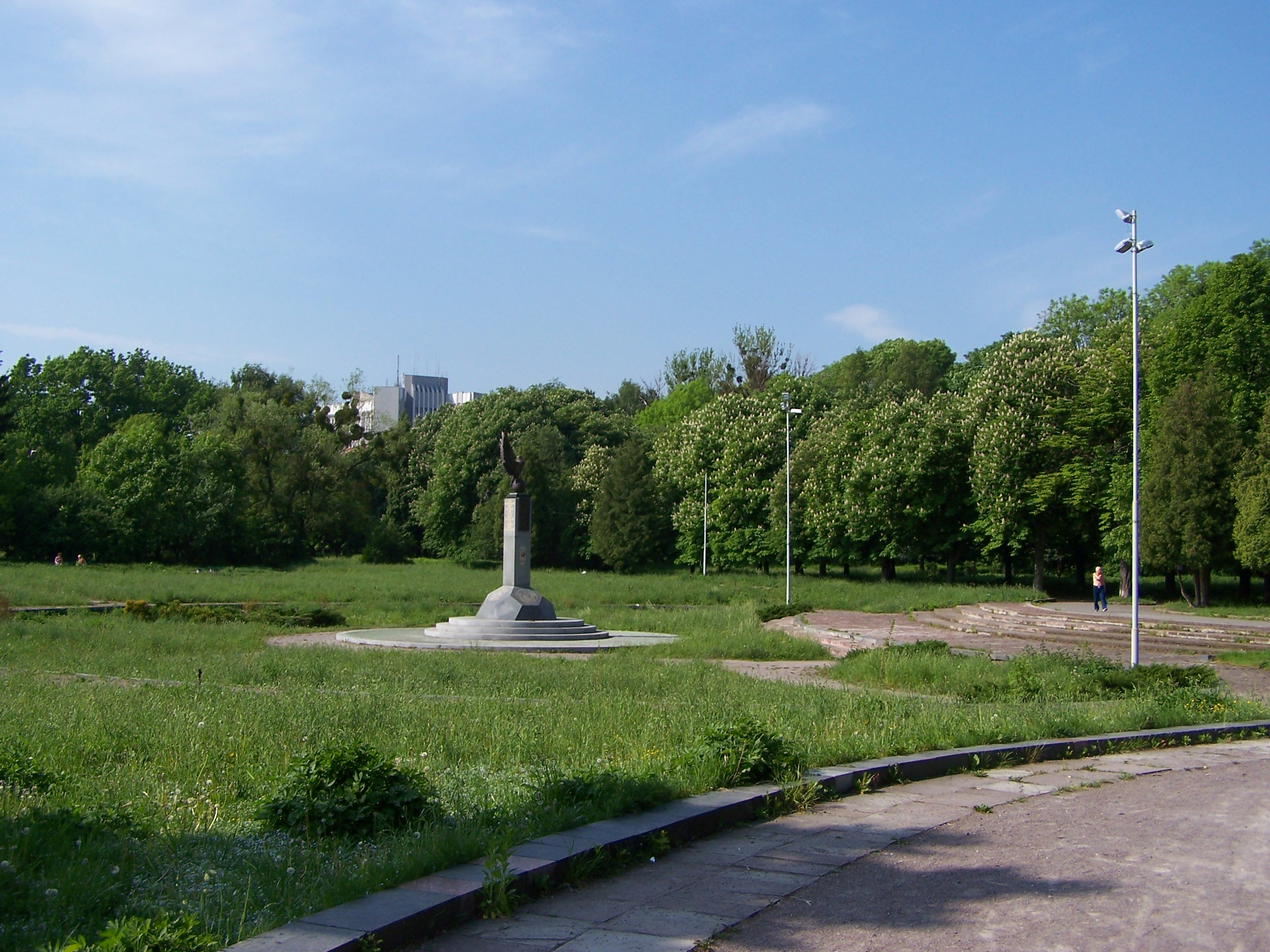
- Stryiskyi Park in Lviv featuring the statue dedicated to Chomicki
- Born: Włodzimierz Michał Chomicki; 19 April 1878; Lwów, Poland
- Died: 12 July 1953 (aged 75); Chocianów, Poland
- Other name: Volodymyr Khomytsky
- Occupations: Educator, footballer
- Known for: Poland's first documented football goal

Włodzimierz Michał Chomicki (19 April 1878 — 12 July 1953) was a Polish teacher and amateur association football player. He is known in Ukraine and Poland as the first person to score an officially documented goal in their countries' history.

== Biography ==
Chomicki was born in Lviv on 19 April 1878 to Michał January and Maria (née Urbanik) Chomicki. He studied at the University of Lviv until 1902, then in Vienna the following year. He did not do any military service.

On 14 July 1894, when Chomicki was only 16, he represented his hometown in an exhibition match against the Kraków Sokół team. A temporary English-style football pitch was set up in Stryiskyi Park to accommodate several sport performances during the General National Exhibition. Two years earlier, the first match, the 1st Falcon Rally, was scheduled but never occurred; this 1894 meeting was then called the 2nd Falcon Rally. As first official football game for what's now Poland and Ukraine, it was played with "local rules" rather than something more formal, with several modern journalists speculating that the players knew just as much about soccer as the spectators. Both teams wore white jerseys but the Cracovian players wore navy blue shorts, while the ones from Lviv wore grey. The number of spectators varies widely between 1,000 and 10,000 and there is speculation that figures such as Franz Joseph I of Austria, Eustachy Stanisław Sanguszko, Adam Stefan Sapieha, and Count Kasimir Felix Badeni were among the audience. The game was played golden goal, or sudden death, and lasted only 6 minutes, when Chomicki scored on Kraków's goalkeeper. Kraków's referee, Zygmunt Wyrobek, attempted to convince others to allow the game to continue but was refused, as football's slot was up and another sport, sometimes identified as gymnastics, was set to perform.

Following the exhibition game, Chomicki played for Pogoń Lwów and the Poland national football team but eventually retired from sport and became a physical education teacher. Before World War II, he worked at the 11th Lviv Gymnasium and/or Junior High School No. 9. He retired from teaching the year before the war but was too old to be eligible to fight. Sometime between 1945 and 1948, Chomicki was repatriated to Chocianów in the Recovered Territories. He lived in poverty at 18 Żymierskiego Street and died 12 July 1953. Chomicki's first marriage lasted between 1911 and 1930, when he was widowed; his second marriage was short and ended in separation. No children came from either marriage. He is buried in a Chocianów cemetery.

== Legacy ==
On Chomicki's 94th birthday, football fans added a commemorative plaque to his gravesite; it reads: "On 14 July 1894 in Lviv, at the Sokol Stadium, the first official football match between the teams from Kraków and Lviv took place. The first goal in this match, and the first in the history of Polish football, was scored by Włodzimierz Chomicki." In 1999, the Ukrainian Association of Football officially recognized 14 July 1894 as the historical beginning of Ukrainian football due to Chomicki's goal. In 2004, on the 110th anniversary of the game, a statue bearing a falcon atop a football was erected in Lviv on the grounds where the stadium used to stand. The inscription reads: "Lviv—the birthplace of Ukrainian football." There is also reportedly a roundabout dedicated to him in Chocianów.
