= Lech (motorcycle) =

Defunct Polish motorcycle brand

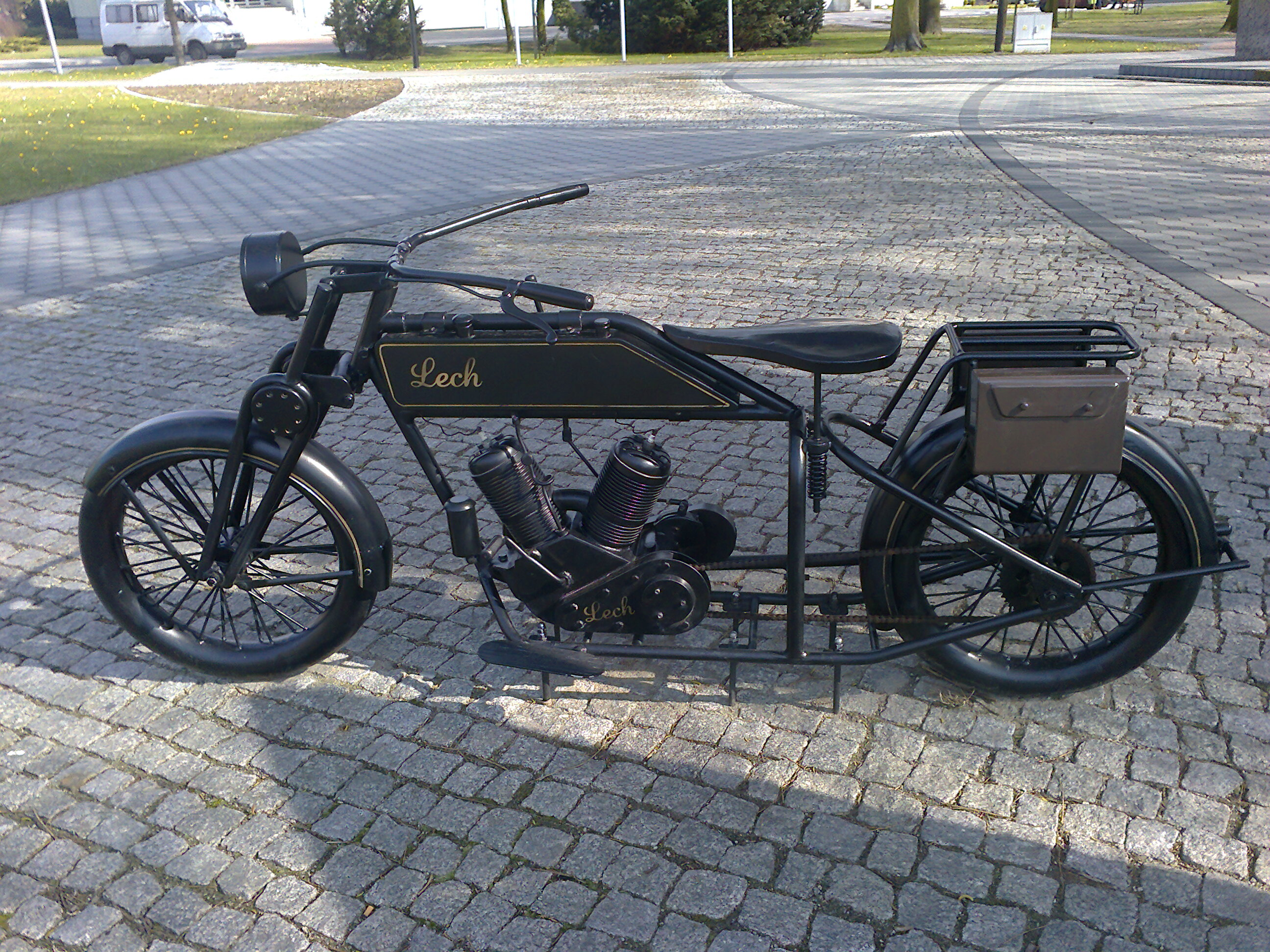
- Reproduction Lech motorcycle in Piłsudskiego Square, Opalenica
- Founded: 1929 in Opalenica, Poland
- Founder: Wacław Sawicki
- Defunct: 1932
- Key people: Władysław Zalewski
- Products: Motorcycles

Lech is a defunct brand of motorcycles that were manufactured in Opalenica, Poland from 1929 - 1932. It is claimed to be the first Polish manufacturer of mass-produced motorcycles.

== History ==
On 1 January 1929, industrialist Wacław Sawicki formed the Lech company in Opalenica to build motorcycles. He employed Władysław Zalewski as chief engineer. Zalewski had recently returned to Poland after emigrating to the United States, and had knowledge of the American motorcycles of the era. The first motorcycle was presented at the 1929 Poznań International Fair. Reporting on the Fair, Samochód (Car) magazine reported of the Lech: "We can also find all the features of solid and durable work in one Polish motorcycle,"Lech", native to Opalenica".

The Ministry of Military Affairs was approached in December 1929 enquiring about supplying motorcycles to the Polish Army. The Military Institute of Engineering Research in Warsaw was also contacted asking for a specification for army motorcycles. Capt. Eng. Pawluć of the Institute of Engineering Research visited the factory in January 1930 and Cpt. Olgierd Górski and eng. Piotr Loesch, also from the institute, visited in February. The reports from these visits were favourable.

An improved model was introduced at the Communication and Tourism Exhibition in Poznań in mid-1930 and was well received by the press. A further updated model was introduced for the 45-kilometre "Po streets Warszawy" rally in 1931.

The Ministry of Military Affairs set up an interdepartmental commission in September to look at the supply of motorcycle. The recommendation of the commission was that 1,000 cc machines were to be supplied by Centralne Warsztaty Samochodowe from their Sokół marque, and Lech were to supply machines under 1,000 cc. This arrangement was to have started in 1932.

The effects of the Great Depression were felt in Poland in the early 1930s and the economy took a downturn. Although Sawicki tried to obtain foreign investment in the company by a share issue, the company was unable to continue and closed in 1932.

== Models ==
=== Lech 500 ===
The 500 cc v-twin engine machine was designed by Zalewski and the engine, frame and front forks were made in the factory. Other components were brought in.

There was a sport version which was prepared for competitions. It competed in the Poznań-Gniezno-Bydgoszcz-Grudziądz-Leszno-Poznań rally, the Poznań-Bydgoszcz-Poznań rally and the Warsaw rally. The Lech machines finished in top positions.

=== Planned models ===
Several further models were planned, including a single cylinder, for use as solo machines or for use with a sidecar.

== Monuments ==
There is a reproduction Lech on display in Piłsudskiego Square, Opalenica. A second reproduction in displayed in the Town Square. Motorcycle club Lech 1929 MC Poland is named in honour of the marque and on 19–21 July 2019 they organised a motorcycle rally to celebrate the 90th anniversary.
