= Stepan Fedak =

Ukrainian independence activist

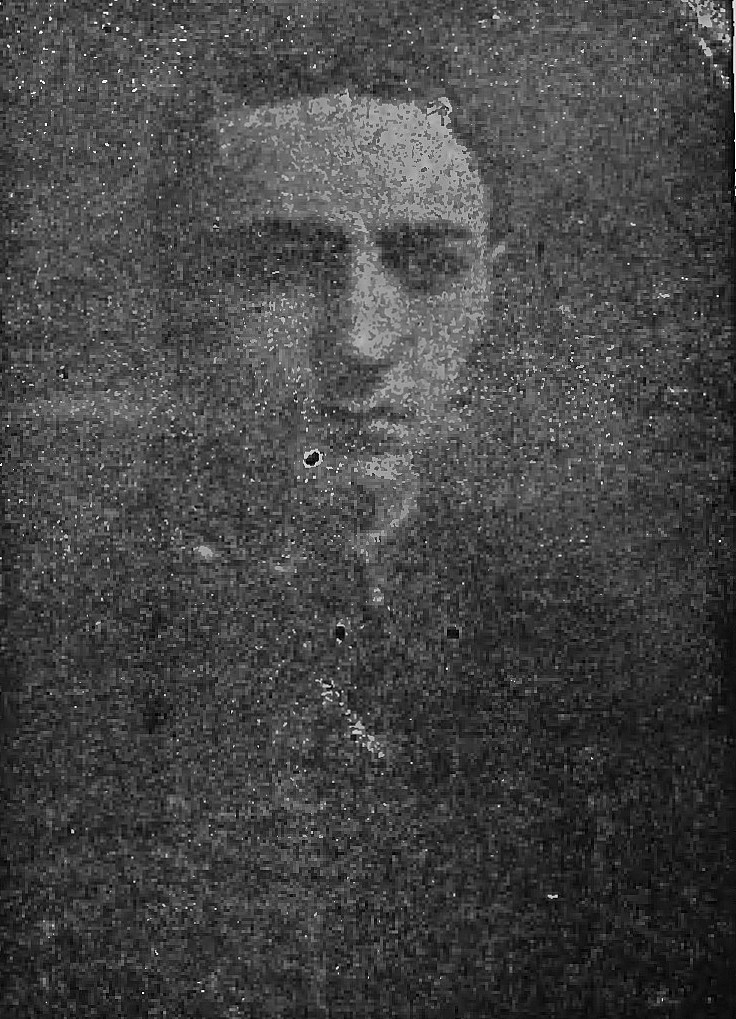
Stepan Fedak (ca. 1921)

Stepan Stepanovich Fedak (6 May 1901 in Lviv – disappeared 1945 in Berlin; aka Smok, "Dragon") was a Ukrainian independence activist, who on 25 September 1921, attempted to assassinate Poland's Chief of State, Marshal Józef Piłsudski, as the latter visited Lwów (now Lviv, Ukraine) for the opening of that city's first Eastern Trade Fair. During World War II he served as a member of the Nazi Einsatzgruppe C.

== Early life ==
Stepan Fedak was the son of a prominent Lwów attorney and Ukrainian activist, Dr. Stepan Fedak.

The younger Fedak was a graduate of the Austro-Hungarian Military Academy at Wiener Neustadt. He served in the Legion of Ukrainian Sich Rifles, then in the Ukrainian Galician Army and the Army of the Ukrainian People's Republic. In 1920 he joined the clandestine Ukrainian Military Organization.

Fedak was also a member of the secret Committee of Ukrainian Youth and of Volia, an underground militant organization of Ukrainian students and ex-officers of the Ukrainian Galician Army whose purpose was to fight for an independent Ukraine. It was steered from abroad by Colonel Yevhen Konovalets' Ukrainian Military Organization (UVO), acting in Czechoslovakia and Germany.

The UVO planned to organize underground attacks and sabotage in southeastern Poland, with its majority-Ukrainian population, to be followed by open warfare conducted by the Ukrainians against Poland and the Soviet Union until an independent Ukrainian state was reestablished in southeastern Poland and Dnieper Ukraine (Great Ukraine).

== Assassination plot ==
A meeting of Lwów Volia members decided to assassinate Polish Chief of State Marshal Józef Piłsudski during his planned visit to Lwów on 25 September 1921, to help open the first Eastern Trade Fair. The conspirators had detailed information about his visit to the city. Volia divided itself into five-man groups, one of which was to carry out the assassination. The actual assassin, chosen by lot, was Stepan Fedak. Furnished with a false passport and German visa, immediately after the operation he was to escape to Berlin. He was to be assisted by the remaining members of his group. Paliyiv, a law student, was to stand beside Fedak and, after Fedak had fired, overpower him and summon police. Another conspirator, disguised as a Polish Army major, would hasten to assist. The two would conduct Fedak out of the crowd, get into a rented automobile with him, and ostensibly drive him off to jail, but actually out of town.

== The attack ==
Having earlier that day participated in the opening of the Trade Fair and then met with bankers, journalists and civic leaders, about 8 p.m. Piłsudski left the city hall, accompanied by Lwów Province Governor Kazimierz Grabowski. They got into an open limousine, with Piłsudski seated on the left. Stepan Fedak pushed his way toward them through the crowd. The car was moving very slowly, when a loud noise rang out. The Governor, sure that it was a back-fire, continued sitting upright; Piłsudski, however, immediately recognized it for a pistol shot and reflexively ducked. The bullet had just missed him by a hair and struck the windshield. Two more shots rang out. One struck the Governor's right shoulder, the other—his left arm. The Governor slipped off his seat, and was supported by Piłsudski.

Police senior constable Jakub Skweres threw himself at Fedak and seized him by the throat. Fedak, as he fell, fired a fourth round, wounding himself in the chest. The crowd pounced on him; he was saved from certain death by policemen and soldiers of the guard standing before the city hall, who knocked the would-be lynchers aside with their rifle butts.

== Aftermath ==
The Governor was treated by physicians and went home, while Piłsudski, as planned, proceeded to Lwów's Great Theatre, where he received an ovation from the gathered public.

The wounded and badly contused Fedak was taken under police escort to a hospital. Immediately interrogated by the police, he falsely stated that he had wanted to shoot only the Governor, whom he considered an enemy of the Ukrainian people, and had planned to then hand his pistol over to Chief of State Piłsudski.

After the performance at the Great Theater, a banquet was held at the provincial administrative offices, with the wounded Governor Grabowski in attendance.

The attack led to mass arrests of UVO members in Galicia. Fedak was sentenced to six years in prison. He was released in 1924 in a prisoners' exchange and escaped abroad. He lived in France and Germany. In 1937, he came back to Ukraine and was arrested. After the German occupation of Poland in September 1939, he escaped from prison again. Subsequently, he became a member of the OUN-M, and joined the Einsatzgruppe C as a translator in the summer of 1941. His main duties were translating documents from Russian and Ukrainian into German and participating in arrests. It is known that Fedak was one of the interpreters of the Sondercommando 4A and participated in the massacre of Babyn Yar. He possibly redacted and/or translated the public notice displayed around the city on 28 September 1941 ordering all Kievan Jews in Russian, Ukrainian and German to assemble for supposed resettlement. According to testimonies from post-war trials in Western Germany, during the shooting at Babyn Yar, he was patrolling the road which led to the massacre site.

According to the Russian secret service SVR, while he was working as an interpreter for the Germans, Fedak delivered information about German spies behind the Russian lines and Nazi Abwehr structures active in Kyiv to Soviet intelligence agent Ivan Kudrya (1912–1942) present in Kyiv at the time, until he was discovered in July 1942. From 1943 to 1945 Fedak served in the SS Division "Galicia". Toward the end of World War II he disappeared without trace in Berlin.

== See also ==
- List of fugitives from justice who disappeared

== Books ==
- Włodzimierz Kalicki, "25 IX 1921. Kula w rękawie ("25 September 1921: a Bullet in the Sleeve"), Gazeta Wyborcza, 26 September 2005. (https://wyborcza.pl/duzyformat/7,127290,2932282.html)
