= Andrzej Jerzy Lech =

Polish artist and photographer

Andrzej Jerzy Lech (born January 22, 1955, in Wrocław, Poland), is a Polish artist and photographer.

== Life and work ==
Between 1981-1984 he studied at the Faculty of Fine Art Photography at the School of Visual Arts in Ostrava, the Czech Republic, in the workshop of Borek Sousedik.

== Group exhibitions ==
In the Fall of 2002, he took part in several exhibitions, including “The End of Life Show” (The Irving Goldman Community Art Gallery, Jersey City, NJ), “Forms of Matter: Artists’ Views of Nature” (Victory Hall, Jersey City, NJ), Central New Jersey Railroad Festival (by invitation, CNJ Railroad Terminal in Liberty State Park, Jersey City, NJ) and the Jersey City Artist Studio Tour.

In May 2005, Lech received the J. Owen Grundy Award from the Jersey City Landmarks Conservancy for his photography of Jersey City and its landmarks.

== Bibliography ==
In 2001, eight of his photographs were printed in the book "Architectural Photography", published by RotoVision Visual Arts Books Publisher, Hoven, England.
