= Leszek A. Gąsieniec =

British computer scientist

Leszek A Gasieniec is a professor of computer science at the University of Liverpool, specialising in algorithms, distributed computing and communication, networks and search problems. He has been with the University of Liverpool since 1997, becoming a full professor in 2003.

He is the head of the Networks and Distributed Computing Group (part of the Algorithms Section) at the University of Liverpool's Department of Computer Science.

He completed his PhD and MSc in computer science from the University of Warsaw and held postdoctoral positions at the Max Planck Institute for Informatics and the Université du Québec. He serves as an editor for the journal Theoretical Computer Science.
