= St. Dominic's Fair =

Cultural event hosted in Gdańsk

St. Dominic's Fair in Gdańsk
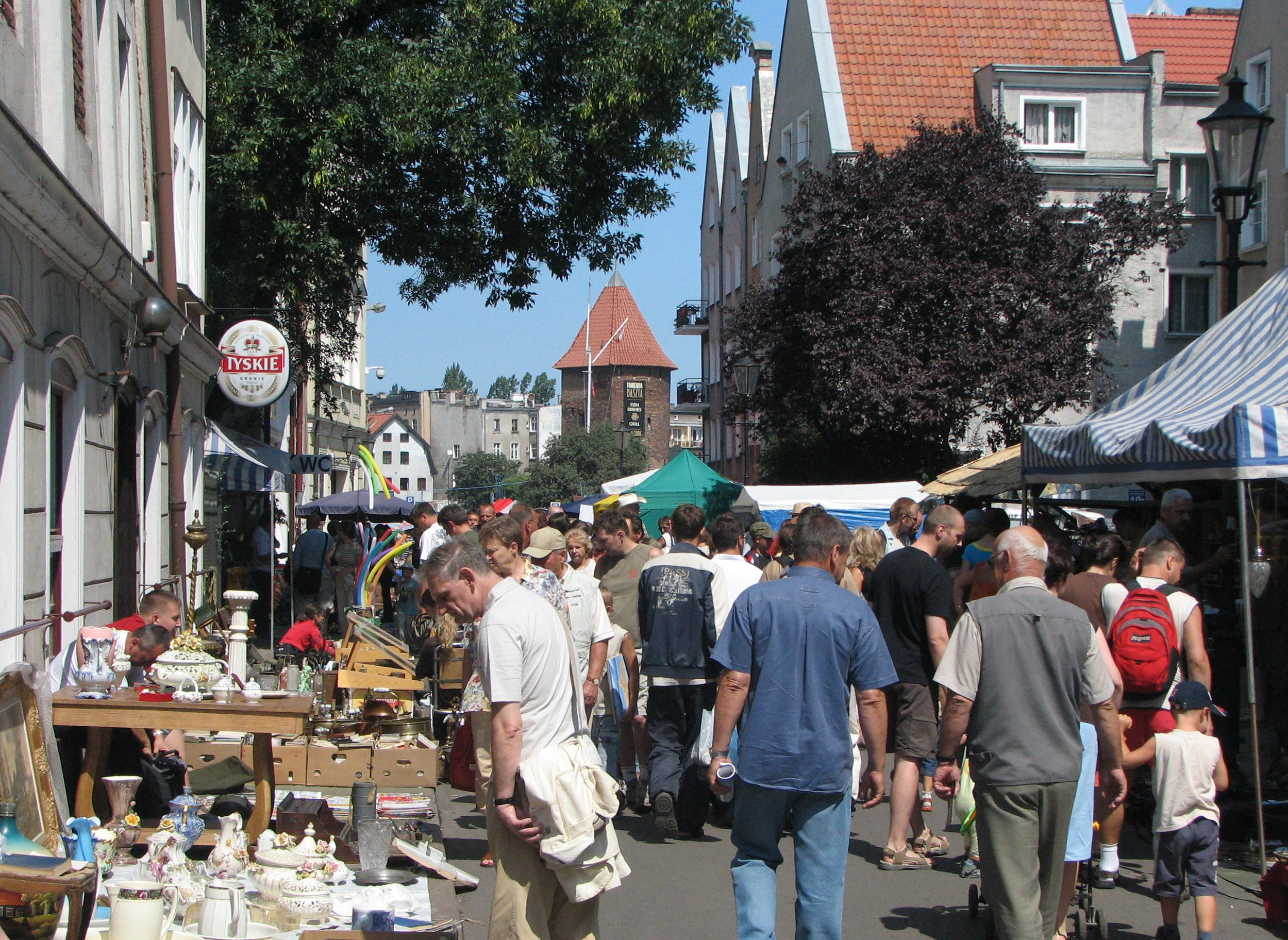
- St. Dominic's Fair in 2006
- Observed by: Gdańsk, Pomerania, Poland
- Type: National
- Celebrations: Parades, food, music, drinking
- Date: 1260
- Duration: 21 days
- Frequency: Annual

St. Dominic's Fair (Polish: Gdański Jarmark św. Dominika), is an annual cultural and trade event organized between July and August in the port city of Gdańsk, Pomeranian Voivodeship, Poland. It was founded in 1260 and together with the Oktoberfest, it is considered one of the biggest cultural and trade open-air events in Europe attended by 5-8 million national and international visitors annually.

In the past, the fair usually lasted for two weeks but since 2004, a decision was made to extend it to three weeks.

== History ==
With 750 years of successful tradition, the history of the fair goes back to the year 1260, when it was established by the decree of Pope Alexander IV.

Saint Dominic was canonized in 1234 and his feast day was immediately included in the General Roman Calendar for celebration on 5 August. With the introduction of the Tridentine calendar in 1568, his feast was moved to 4 August, where it remained until the 1969 revision moved it to 8 August. It was thus at some time between 1568 and 1969 that it became customary to announce the opening of the fair by the ringing of bells at noon on 4 August. In the beginning, it was all about prayers and entertainment, but later the fair began to function as a trade and cultural event with great importance to the city. At first, it was held at the Dominic Square but, as the event developed, it needed greater space, so the fair was moved into the area of Wały Jagiellońskie and Długa Streets. Also, new marketplaces, such as Targ Drzewny, Targ Sienny, Targ Węglowy, Targ Wąchany or Targ Rybny were created. Their names were closely related to the goods, which were sold on each market and in the case of Długi Targ the name was derived from its shape. Around 400 ships sailed to the Port of Gdańsk for the August fair and the transactions were held in many languages. It was possible to buy famous Toruń gingerbreads, Kashubian ceramics, Czech glass, Eastern furs and carpets, English cloth, gypsy pots, Goldwasser (type of vodka) and amber. Apart from merchants, in the fair participated also circus performers, jugglers, acrobats and theatre groups.

St. Dominic's Fair became an important event for the city and it was organized annually for centuries. However, the outbreak of the Second World War and the almost complete flight and expulsion of the city's German population during and after the war caused the fair to disappear for 33 years. In 1972, owing to the efforts of Wojciech Święcicki, a journalist from a popular Gdańsk evening paper Wieczór Wybrzeża, the tradition of the fair was restored. In the 1970s the fair was mostly viewed as a trade event, providing the opportunity to buy desired goods. During special fashion shows commonly called "Live Journal" the latest Polish fashion collections were presented.

== St. Dominic's Fair today ==
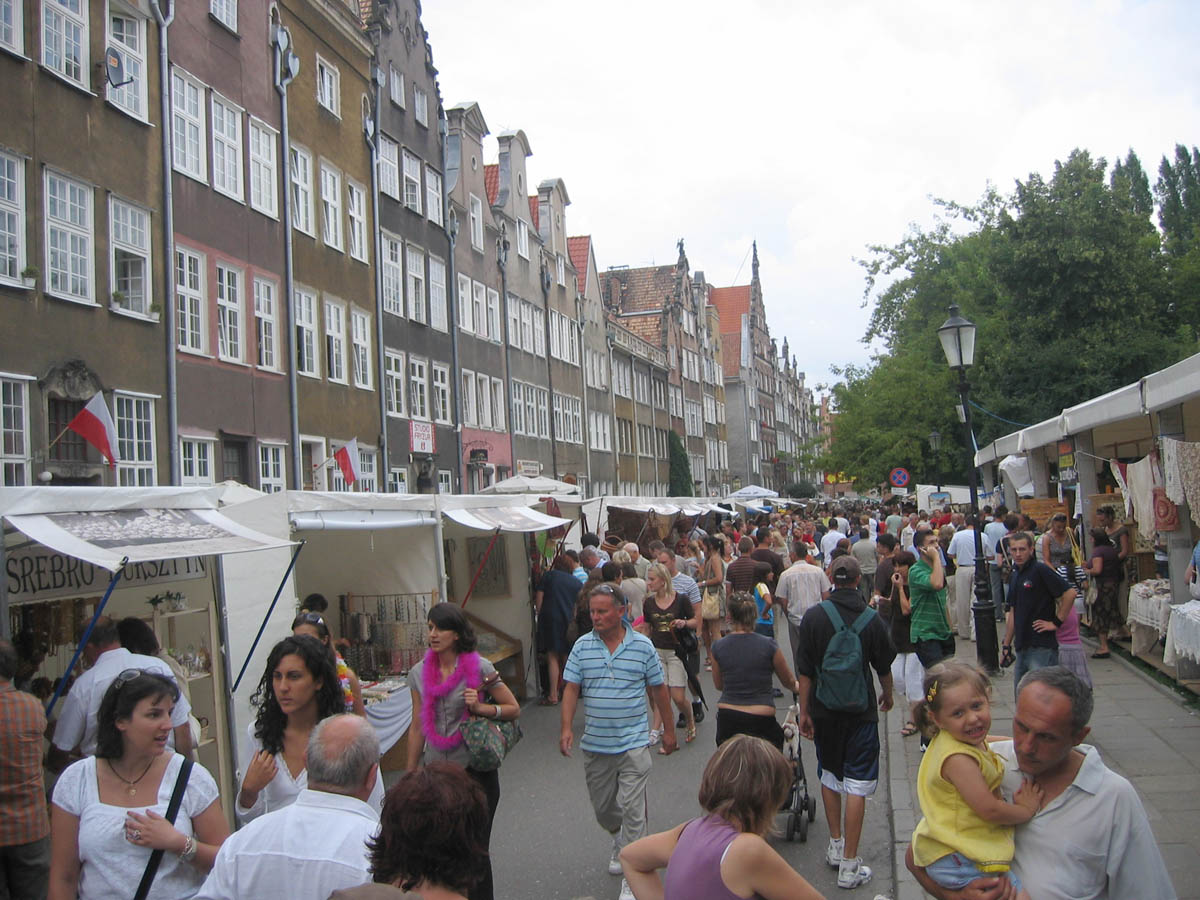
św. Ducha Street. St. Dominic's Fair, 2008

For many years, since its reactivation in 1972, the St. Dominic's Fair lasted for two weeks. In 2004, a decision was made to extend it up to three full weeks. Every year, about 1000 merchants, artists, artisans and collectors take part in the Fair, and it is visited by an average of 70,000 people daily, whose number usually doubles at weekends. As the organizers declare, approximately 5 million people come and go through the Old Town of Gdańsk during each St. Dominic's Fair (in 2007 there were as many as 8.5 million of them which is still a record). The contemporary character of the event recalls the medieval tradition of fun and trade. One can find there an abundance of food stalls offering cold beer, meat, potatoes, sausages, and shish kebabs baked on a gridiron. Tourists from abroad will additionally have a unique opportunity to taste some traditional Polish dishes, like e.g. pierogi (dumplings), bigos (stewed dish made of sauerkraut and/or fresh cabbage, meat and mushrooms), or farmhouse bread with lard and dill pickles.

Just as before the war, there is a funfair which used to be a major attraction during the times of the free city of Danzig. In year 1938 the funfair became even more famous when a 2-metre crocodile escaped from its menagerie and jumped into the Motława river. It took quite a long time to catch it, and the escape caused a general sensation. For obvious reasons, the funfair has changed its character throughout all those years. The halls of mirrors have disappeared and nobody cuts women into two pieces with a handsaw during magic shows; however, it still remains one of the main attractions for the youngest participants of the St. Dominic's Fair.

The number of stalls increases each year, and the programme of the Fair is diversified by various cultural and entertainment events. On the stalls we can find numismatic and philatelic collections, as well as handicrafts, haberdashery, valuable cloths and antiques. All those products and many more may be bought on the popular flea market. Unfortunately, as it happens in other similar fairs in the world, some fake products are sold as well. In the past, for example, it was possible to buy pictures of Kossak, Witkacy and numerous other well-known painters. However, the majority of merchants and collectors are fair and treat visitors seriously. They arrive not only from the farthest corners of Poland but also from other countries, like Lithuania, Latvia, Germany, Austria, Sweden and such distant as Israel or Uzbekistan. All those foreign sellers offer products and souvenirs distinctive for their culture.

In 2020, amid the ongoing COVID-19 pandemic, the fair was held in a limited format attracting 250,000 visitors and 600 exhibitors (1/3 of the usual number).

== The plan of the Fair ==
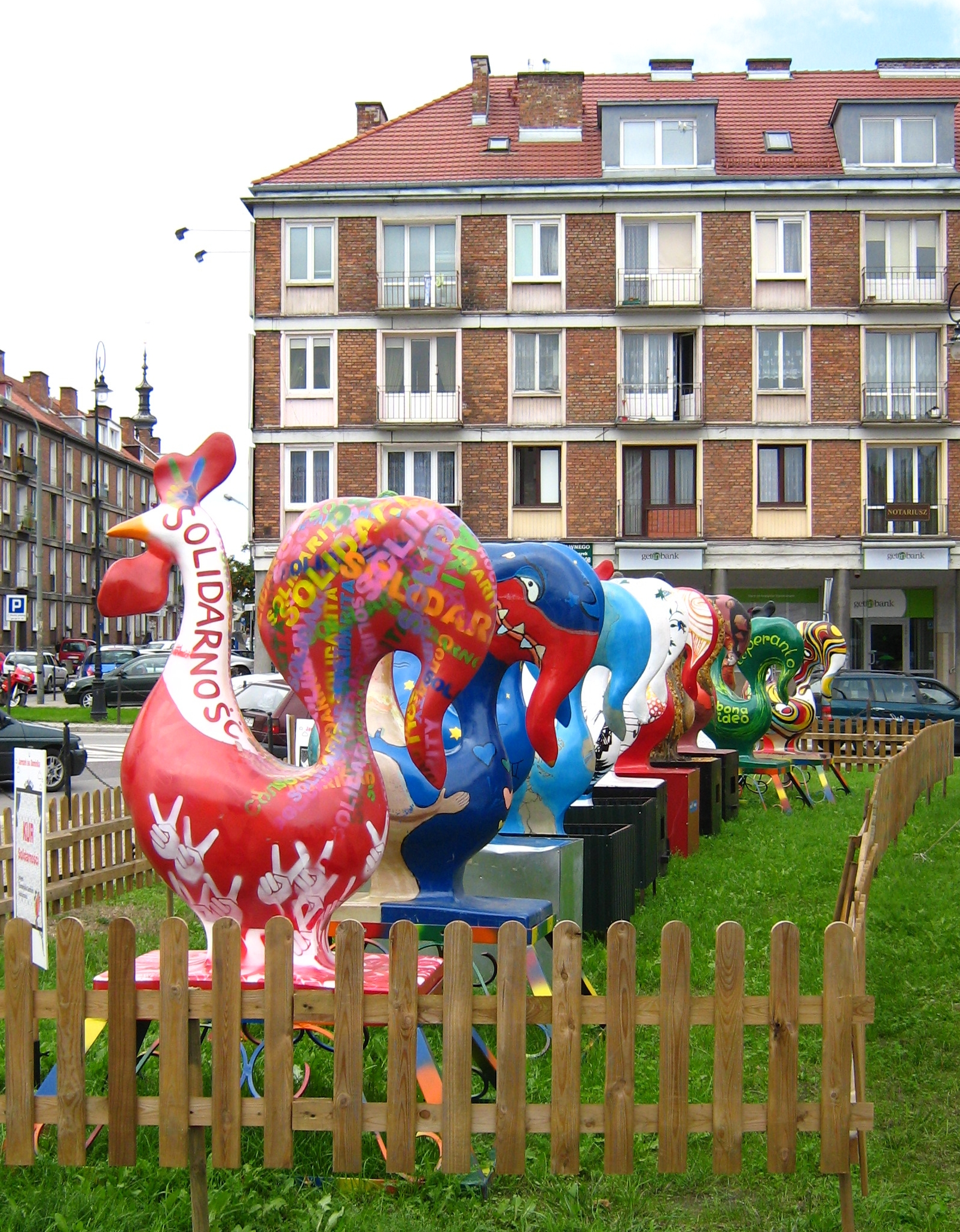
St. Dominic's Fair in 2010. The rooster was chosen as the symbol of the fair.

- multibranch stalls – Szeroka, św. Ducha, Grobla I, Grobla II Streets;
- craft articles and jewellery – Mariacka Street, Długie Pobrzeże, Rybackie Pobrzeże, Długi Targ;
- souvenirs and artists’ stalls – Długa Street, Długi Targ, Zielony Most;
- stalls of collectors and hobbyists – Wartka and Straganiarska Streets, Targ Rybny;
- gastronomic stalls – Targ Węglowy, Targ Rybny, Szeroka Streets.

== The programme of the Fair ==
- outdoor stages,
- festivals,
- fêtes and concerts,
- demonstration of fireworks and laser lights,
- street parades,
- rock concerts,
- chamber and organ music concerts,
- sport events and competitions (St. Dominic's Race).

== See also ==
- History of Gdańsk
- Culture of Poland
- Saint John's Fair, Poznań
