= Joanna Lech =

Polish poet and writer

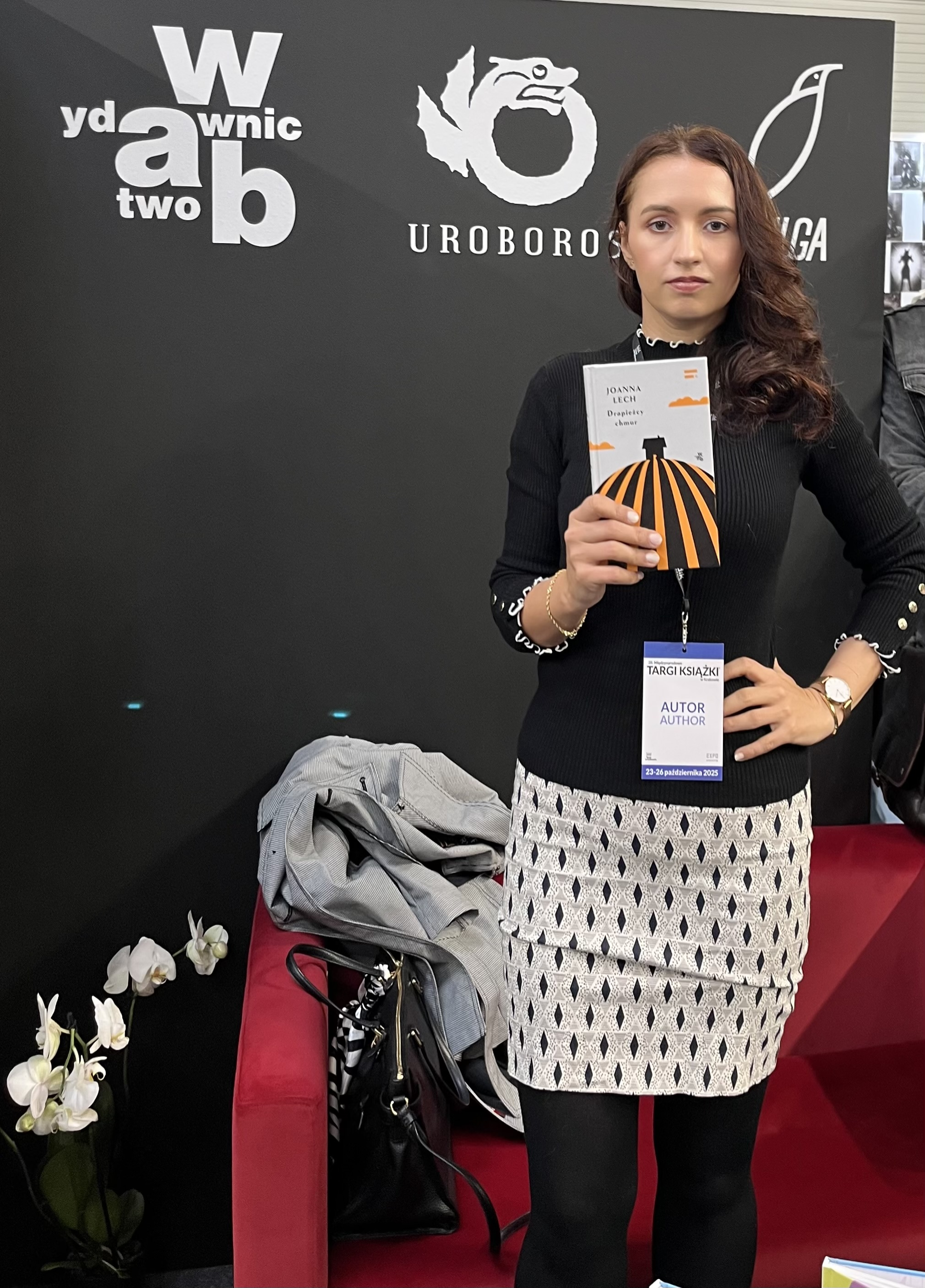
Joanna Lech Joanna Lech at the 2025 Book Fair in Kraków
- Born: 25 January 1984 (age 42); Rzeszów, Poland
- Occupations: Poet, writer
- Website: www.joannalech.pl

Joanna Lech (born 25 January 1984, in Rzeszów, Poland) – a Polish poet and writer. Author of three novels: Sztuczki (nominated for NIKE Literary Award 2017 and Gdynia Literary Prize 2017), Kokon, Drapieżcy chmur and five poetry collections: Zapaść, Nawroty (nominated for NIKE Literary Award 2011), Trans, Piosenki Pikinierów, Nocne i niecne. Editor of the anthology Znowu pragnę ciemnej miłości.

Participant of international literary festivals and book fairs in Ukraine, Czechia, Estonia, and the United Kingdom. Her poetry was translated into English, German, Ukrainian, Estonian, and Czech. She published in the US anthology Scattering the Dark, Two Lines: The Future of Translation, and in journals: Guernica Magazine, Atlanta Review, and Rowboat (translated by Karen Kovacik). OFF_Press London published her bilingual collection Nic z tego / Nothing of this (translated by Marek Kazmierski). Her poems appeared in the anthologies Free Over Blood and Once Upon a Deadline, the trilinguial journal Radar, and the Czech literary magazine Tvar.

Grant recipient of the City of Kraków, the Grazella Foundation, and the ZAiKS Authors' Association. Resident of the International Writers' and Translators' House in Ventspils, the Czech Literary Centre in Broumov, the Once Upon a Deadline project in the UK, the Visegrad Literary Residencies in Budapest, Prague UNESCO, Tropinka in Białowieża, Parada – House of Three Cultures, the Baltic Centre for Writers and Translators in Visby, and Tartu UNESCO.

Graduate of the Literary-Arts faculty of Jagiellonian University in Kraków. Lives in Kraków.

== Works ==
=== Novels ===
- Sztuczki (Warsaw 2016)
- Kokon (Warsaw 2019)
- Drapieżcy chmur (Warsaw 2025)

=== Poetry ===
- Zapaść (Łódź 2009)
- Nawroty (Poznań 2010)
- Nic z tego / Nothing of this (London 2011)
- Trans (Mikołów 2016)
- Piosenki Pikinierów (Szczecin 2017)
- Nocne i niecne (Katowice 2024)

=== Anthologies ===
- Poeci na nowy wiek (Wrocław 2010)
- Pociąg do poezji (Kutno 2011)
- Almanach (Lviv 2011)
- Poeci i poetki przekraczają granice. Sto wierszy (Katowice 2011)
- Free Over Blood (London 2011)
- Once Upon a Deadline (London 2012)
- Węzły, sukienki, żagle. Nowa poezja, ojczyzna i dziewczyna (Złoty Środek Poezji, 2013)
- 2014. Antologia współczesnych polskich opowiadań (FORMA, 2014)
- Dzikie Dzieci. Antologia laureatów konkursu im. Jacka Bierezina (Dom Literatury in Łódź, 2014)
- Przewodnik po zaminowanym terenie (OPT / IMPART, 2016)
- Scattering the Dark: An Anthology of Polish Women Poets (White Pine Press, 2016)
- Znowu pragnę ciemnej miłości (W.A.B., 2018) - editor
