= Targi Północne =

Targi Północne (The Northern Trade Fair) was a trade fair in interbellum Poland. It was established in 1928 and held in Wilno (now Vilnius, Lithuania). The Fair was designed to attract businesses from the area of northeastern Poland, as well as Lithuania, Latvia and the Soviet Union.

== Highlights ==
The first annual Northern Trade Fair took place between August 18 and September 9, 1928. The main pavilion built in the beautiful city-park, along with the entire thematic layout of the exhibit with its 16 divisions, was designed by architect Jan Łuczkowski. The fair was visited by the staggering 180,000 guests in the first year. Even though, it never became as successful as similar events in Lwów (Targi Wschodnie) or in Poznań (Poznań International Fair), it was the biggest annual event locally showcasting textiles, furniture, farm animals, furs, tourist equipment, production machinery and many other commercial products. The last fair took place between August 19 and September 3, 1939, but was not finished due to joint Nazi and Soviet attack on Poland.

== See also ==
- Poznań International Fair
- Targi Wschodnie (The Eastern Trade Fair)
- Polish culture in the Interbellum
