= Lech Woszczerowicz =

Polish politician

member of Sejm 2005-2007
- In office 25 September 2005 – 2007

Personal details
- Born: 1940 (age 85–86)
- Party: Samoobrona

Lech Woszczerowicz (born 8 May 1940 in Lwów) is a Polish politician. He was elected to the Sejm on 25 September 2005, getting 5987 votes in 26 Gdynia district as a candidate from the Samoobrona Rzeczpospolitej Polskiej list.

== See also ==
- Members of Polish Sejm 2005-2007
