= Saint John's Fair, Poznań =

Annual cultural and commercial event

Saint John's Fair (Polish: Jarmark Świętojański) is a cultural and commercial event taking place in Poznań, traditionally in the second half of June, on the Old Market Square and adjacent streets.

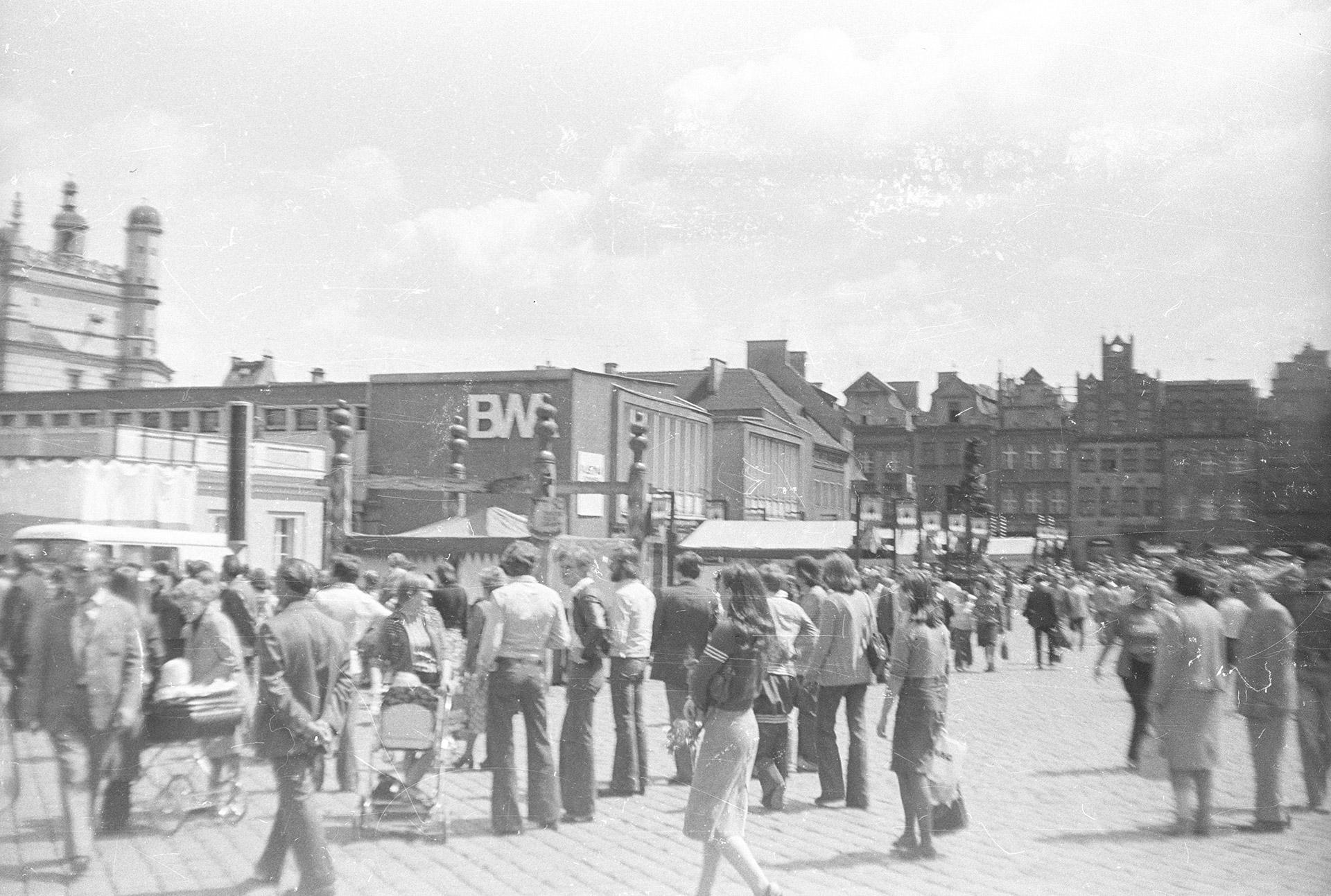
Market Square during the 1978 Fair

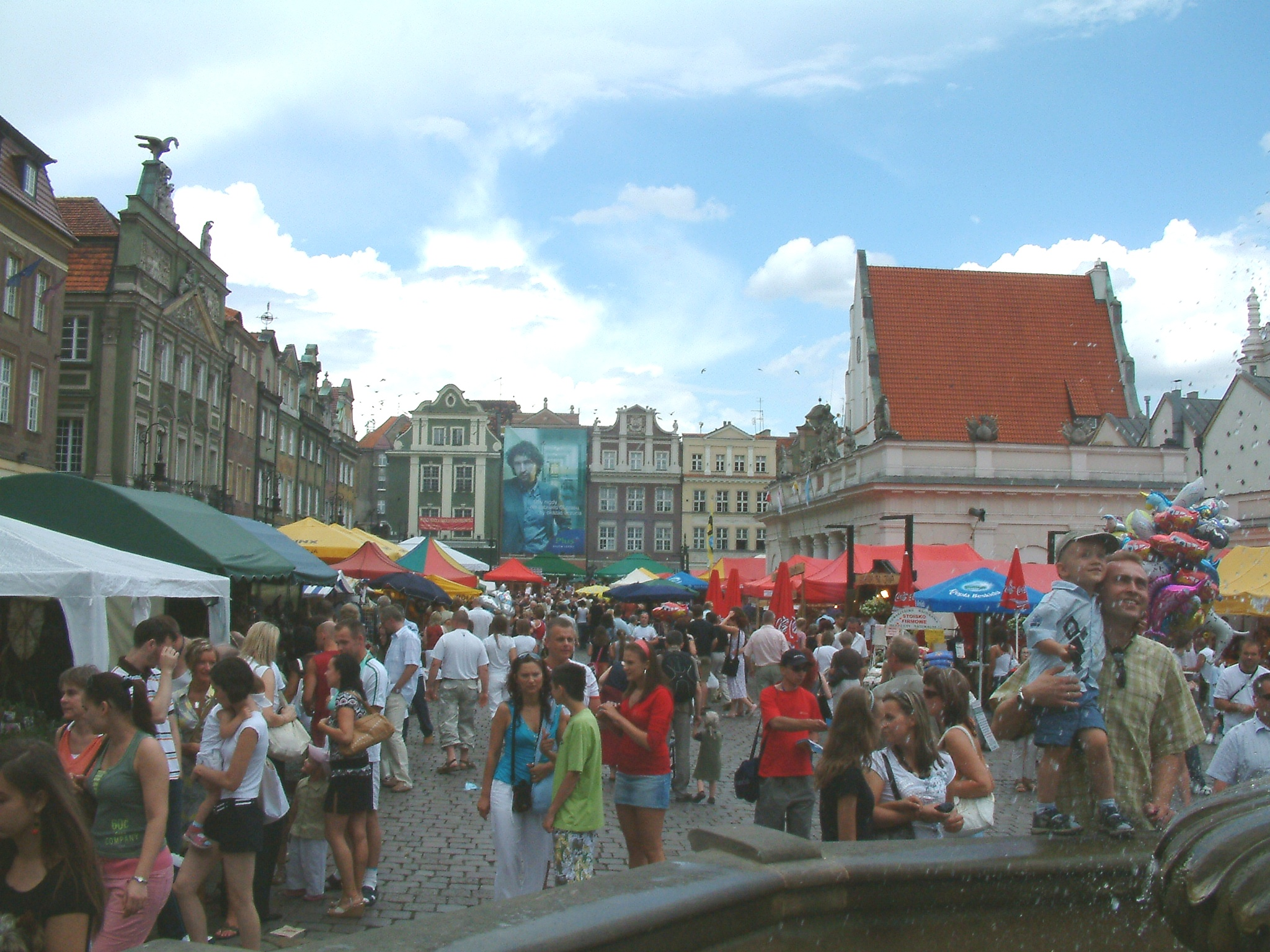
Jarmark Świętojański (2007)

The tradition of fairs dates back to the sixteenth and seventeenth centuries (although they were held earlier), when there was the greatest flourishing fair trade in Poznań. At that time, the Market Square attracted merchants from various, often very distant, European countries. The largest fair took place around 24 June, on St. John's Day, and the subject of trade was then mainly grain and wool. After the collapse of the trade in these articles, the fairs fell into decline, especially at the beginning of the 18th century. It was reopened in 1780 by the Good Order Commission. The 19th century caused that the fairs also gained a social function and became the time of meetings of the Wielkopolska landowners (they were called St John's Day contracts). Numerous balls were held at that time, theatres and dancers arrived.

The tradition was revived in 1975 on the initiative of President Andrzej Wituski (inspired by the appearance of Grand-Place in Brussels) and temporarily connected with the organization of the Poznań International Fair. At that time, state trade prevailed and one could buy scarce goods, which were absent from the shelves of shops on ordinary days. Nowadays, the fair is an arena for trade in handicrafts, regional food and antiques. It is accompanied by numerous festivals and cultural performances, mainly musical. It is one of the magnets that attracts tourists.

== Literature ==
- Łęcki W., Maluśkiewicz P., Poznań od A do Z, Poznań: KAW, 1986, s. 53, ISBN 83-03-01260-6, OCLC 835895412.
- Włodzimierz Łęcki, Poznań - przewodnik po zabytkach i osobliwościach miasta dla przybyszów z dalszych i bliższych stron, wyd. Zysk i S-ka, Poznań, 2010, s.32, ISBN 978-83-7506-466-7
