= Sławomir =

- Pronunciation: [swaˈvɔmir]
- Gender: male
- Language: Polish

Origin
- Origin: Slavic
- Meaning: sława 'glory, fame' + mir 'peace, world'
- Region of origin: Poland

Other names
- Alternative spelling: Slawomir
- Nicknames: Sławek, Slavko, Mirek, Mirko, Sławka, Mirka, Slava
- Related names: Slavomir, Slavomír, Sławosz, Mirosław

Sławomir (Polish pronunciation: [swaˈvɔmir]) is a Polish male given name of Slavic origin. It consists of the stems -sław (sława, 'glory, fame') and mir ('peace, world').

The feminine form of the name is Sławomira (pronounced [swavɔˈmira]).

The Croatian and Serbian form of the name is Slavomir, the Czech and Slovak form is Slavomír. Nicknames for the name include Sławek, Slavko, Slavka, Sławka, Slava, Mirko, Mirek and Mira.

Notable people with the name include:

== Sławomir ==
- Sławomir Abramowicz (born 2004), Polish footballer
- Sławomir Adamus (born 1961), Polish football player and coach
- Sławomir Barul (born 1964), Polish cyclist
- Sławomir Maciej Bittner (1923–1944), Polish scoutmaster and army officer
- Sławomir Bohdziewicz (born 1990), Polish boxer
- Sławomir Borewicz, fictional character in the Polish 07 zgłoś się television series
- Sławomir Borowiecki (born 1977), Polish figure skater
- Sławomir Busch (born 1998), Polish volleyball player
- Sławomir Cenckiewicz (born 1971), Polish historian, journalist and politician
- Sławomir Chałaśkiewicz (born 1963), Polish football player
- Sławomir Chmura (born 1983), Polish long track speed skater
- Sławomir Chrzanowski (born 1969), Polish cyclist
- Sławomir Cienciała (born 1983), Polish footballer
- Sławomir Cieślakowski (born 1961) is a Polish rower
- Sławomir Ćwik (born 1972), Polish economist, lawyer and politician
- Sławomir Dębski (born 1971), Polish historian and political scientist
- Sławomir Dobrzański (born 1968), Polish-American pianist, teacher and musicologist
- Sławomir Drabik (born 1966), Polish speedway rider
- Sławomir Fabicki (born 1970), Polish film director and screenwriter
- Sławomir Grünberg, Polish-American director and cameraman
- Sławomir Idziak (born 1945), Polish cinematographer and director
- Sławomir Jan Piechota (born 1960), Polish politician
- Sławomir Jarczyk (born 1980), Polish footballer
- Sławomir Jeneralski (born 1961), Polish journalist and politician
- Sławomir Kłosowski (born 1964), Polish politician
- Sławomir Kohut (born 1977), Polish cyclist
- Sławomir Kołodziej (born 1961), Polish mathematician
- Sławomir Krawczyk (born 1963), Polish cyclist
- Sławomir Kruszkowski (born 1975), Polish rower
- Sławomir Kuczko (born 1985), Polish swimmer
- Sławomir Lachowski (born 1958), Polish economist and banker
- Sławomir Łosowski (born 1951), Polish synthesizer player in synth pop band Kombi
- Sławomir Maciejowski (1951–2023), Polish rower
- Sławomir Majak (born 1969), Polish football player and coach
- Sławomir Majusiak (1964–2021), Polish long-distance runner
- Sławomir Marczewski (1950–2024), Polish politician
- Sławomir Mentzen (born 1986), Polish politician, entrepreneur and tax advisor
- Sławomir Miklaszewski (1874–1949), Polish soil scientist and university professor
- Sławomir Mocek (born 1976), Polish fencer
- Sławomir Mordarski (born 1979), Polish slalom canoeist
- Sławomir Mrożek (1930–2013), Polish dramatist and writer
- Sławomir Musielak (born 1990), Polish motorcycle speedway rider
- Sławomir Napłoszek (born 1968), Polish archer
- Sławomir Nawrocki (born 1969), Polish fencer
- Sławomir Nazaruk (born 1975), Polish footballer
- Sławomir Nitras (born 1973), Polish politician
- Sławomir Nowak (born 1974), Polish politician
- Sławomir Olszewski (born 1973), Polish footballer
- Sławomir Orzeł (born 1979), Polish strongman competitor
- Sławomir Peszko (born 1985), Polish footballer
- Sławomir Petelicki (1946–2012), Polish general
- Sławomir Podsiadło, Polish chemist
- Sławomir Poleszak (born 1969), Polish historian
- Sławomir Pstrong (1975–2015), Polish director
- Sławomir Ratajski (born 1955), Polish painter and diplomat
- Sławomir Rawicz (1915–2004), Polish army lieutenant
- Sławomir Romanowski (born 1957), Polish sports shooter
- Sławomir Rutka (1975–2009), Polish footballer
- Sławomir Rybicki (born 1960), Polish politician
- Sławomir Rynkiewicz (born 1970), Polish-Swedish actor
- Sławomir Sierakowski (born 1979), Polish publicist, sociologist and literary critic
- Sławomir Skrzypek (1963–2010), Polish banker
- Sławomir Skręta, Polish musician and record label owner
- Sławomir Starosta (born 1965), Polish activist, musician and journalist
- Sławomir Stolc (born 1993), Polish volleyball player
- Sławomir Szary (born 1979), Polish footballer
- Sławomir Szeliga (born 1982), Polish footballer
- Sławomir Szkredka (born 1974), Polish Catholic prelate
- Sławomir Szmal (born 1978), Polish handball player
- Sławomir Szwedowski (1928–2000), Polish economist and university professor
- Sławomir Tryc (born 1952), Polish scientist and diplomat
- Sławomir Twardygrosz (born 1967), Polish footballer
- Sławomir Wieloch (born 1969), Polish ice hockey player
- Sławomir Wojciechowski (born 1973), Polish footballer
- Sławomir Wolniak (born 1988), Polish swimmer
- Sławomir Zapała (born 1983), known mononymously as Sławomir, Polish singer-songwriter and actor
- Sławomir Zawada (born 1965), Polish weightlifter
- Sławomir Zawiślak (born 1963), Polish politician
- Sławomir Zgrzywa (born 1962), Polish politician
- Sławomir Zwierzyński (born 1966), Polish fencer

== Sławomira ==
- Sławomira Szpek (born 1974), Polish sport shooter
- Sławomira Wronkowska-Jaśkiewicz (born 1943), Polish legal scholar and university professor

== See also ==
- Slavomir
- Slávek
- Sławosz
- Polish name
