= Jarczyk =

Jarczyk is a Polish surname. Notable people with the surname include:

- Robert Jarczyk (born 1959), German television actor
- Sławomir Jarczyk (born 1980), Polish footballer

== See also ==
- Janczyk
- Jurczyk
