= Sławoj =

Sławoj / Slavoj
- Gender: male

Origin
- Origin: Slavic
- Meaning: sława ("fame") + woj ("war, warrior")

Other names
- Variant form: Wojsław, Vojislav
- Nickname: Sławek
- Related names: Slavoj, Sławomir, Slavoljub, Sławosz

Sławoj is a Slavic given name consists of two parts: "sława/slava" - which means "fame", and "woj/voj" - which means "war, warrior". Alternative forms: Wojsław, Vojislav. The name may refer to:

- Karel Slavoj Amerling, a Czech teacher, writer and philosopher
- Sławoj Leszek Głódź, a Polish prelate of the Catholic Church
- Felicjan Sławoj Składkowski, a Polish physician, general, Minister of Internal Affairs and former Prime Minister of Poland
- Slavoj Žižek, a Slovenian continental philosopher and critical theorist

== See also ==
- Slavic names
- Slavoj
