= Ratajski =

Ratajski (feminine Ratajska) is a Polish surname. Notable people include:

- Cyryl Ratajski (1875–1942), Polish politician and lawyer
- Karolina Ratajska (born 1987), Polish darts player
- Krzysztof Ratajski (born 1977), Polish darts player
- Sławomir Ratajski (born 1955), Polish painter and diplomat

== See also ==
- Rataj
- Ratajczak
