= Sławosz =

- Gender: male
- Name day: July 25

Origin
- Origin: Slavic
- Meaning: sława/slava ("glory, famous")

Other names
- Nicknames: Sławo, Slavo, Sława, Slava
- Related names: Sławomir, Slavomír, Slavomir, Sławoj, Slavoj, Slávek

Sławosz is a Polish masculine given name. It originated as a diminutive of names beginning with the Slavic element slava (meaning "glory"), such as Sławomir.

Notable people with the name include:

- Sławosz Szydłowski (1894–1952), Polish athlete
- Sławosz Uznański-Wiśniewski (born 1984), Polish astronaut (European Astronaut Corps)
