= Given name =

Part of a personal name

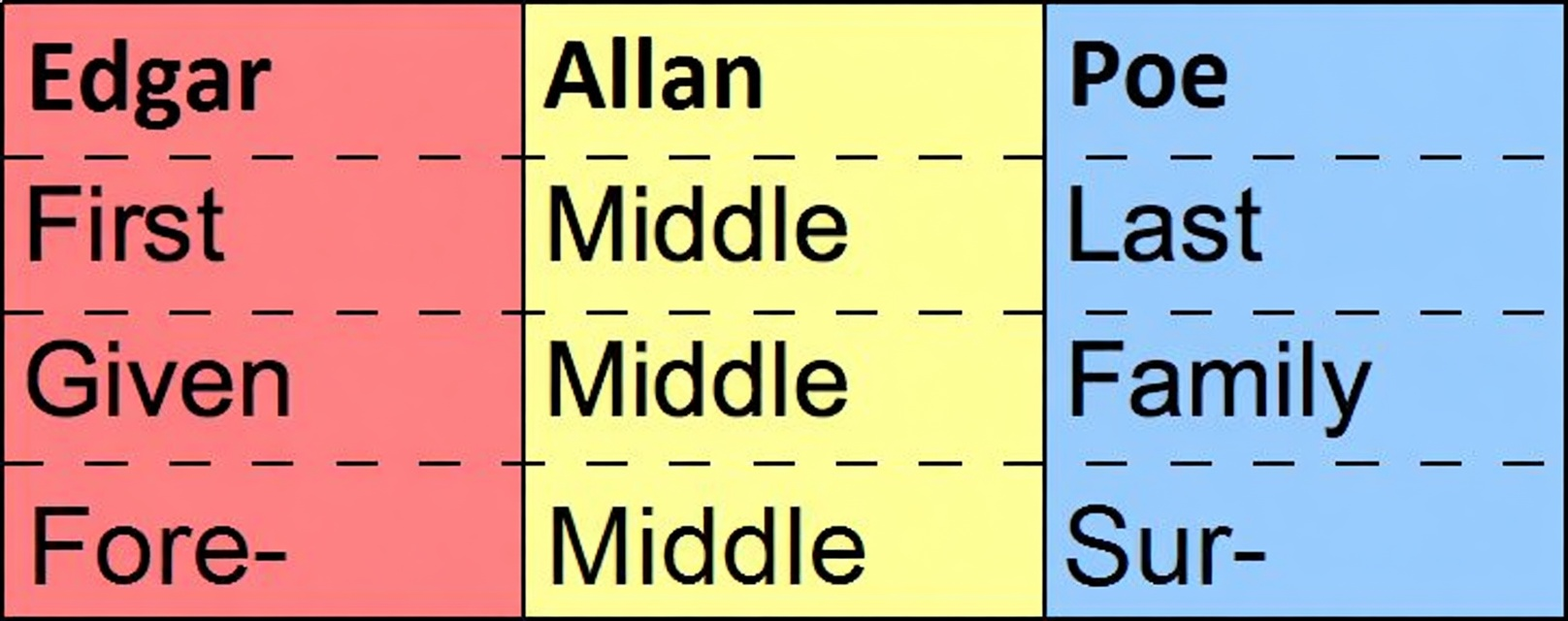
First/given/forename, middle, and last/family/surname with Edgar Allan Poe as example. This shows a structure typical for Anglophonic cultures (and some others). Other cultures use other structures for full names.

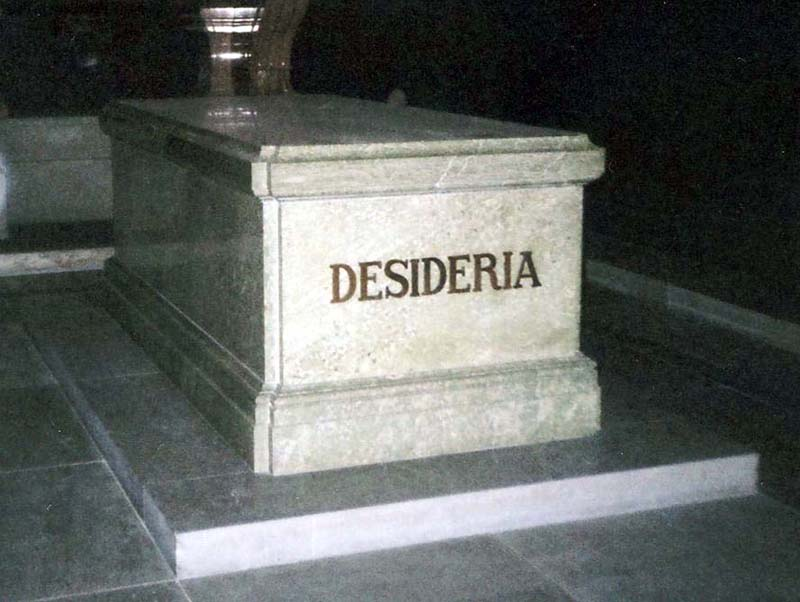
The sarcophagus at Riddarholm Church in Sweden of Queen Desideria has an official name given to Désirée Clary not at birth but when she became Crown Princess of Sweden in 1810.

A given name (also known as a forename or first name) is the part of a personal name that identifies a person, possibly with one or more middle names as well, and differentiates that person from the other members of a group (typically a family or clan) who have a common surname. The term given name refers to a name usually bestowed at or close to the time of birth, usually by the parents of the newborn. A Christian name is the first name given at baptism.

In informal situations, given names are often used in a familiar and friendly manner. In more formal situations, a person's surname may be used. In Western culture, the idioms "on a first-name basis" and "being on first-name terms" refer to the familiarity inherent in addressing someone by their given name.

By contrast, a surname (also known as a family name or last name) is normally inherited and shared with other members of one's immediate family. Regnal names and religious or monastic names are special names bestowed upon someone receiving a crown or entering a religious order; such a person then typically becomes known chiefly by that name.

== Name order ==
The order given name – family name, commonly known as Western name order, is used throughout most European countries and in countries that have cultures predominantly influenced by European culture, such as North and South America; North, East, Central and West India; Australia, New Zealand, and the Philippines.

The order family name – given name, commonly known as Eastern name order, is primarily used in Sinosphere (Greater China, Japan, both Koreas, Vietnam, including Chinese Singaporeans and Chinese Malaysians), as well as in South and Northeast India, and as a standard in Hungary. This order is also used to various degrees and in specific contexts elsewhere in Europe, including Austria and adjacent areas of Germany such as Bavaria, (Note: However, the family name – individual name order is used only in informal or traditional contexts. The official naming follows the Western name order.) and in France, Switzerland, Belgium, Greece and Italy, possibly because of the influence of bureaucracy, which commonly puts the family name before the given name. In China and Korea, part of the given name may be shared among all members of a given generation within a family and extended family or families, in order to differentiate those generations from other generations.

The order given name – father's family name – mother's family name is commonly used in several Spanish-speaking countries to acknowledge the families of both parents.

The order given name – mother's family name – father's family name is commonly used in Portuguese-speaking countries to acknowledge the families of both parents. Today, people in Spain and Uruguay can legally rearrange their names from another order to this one.

The order given name – father's given name – grandfather's given name (often referred to as patronymic) is the official naming order used in some Arabic countries (for example, Saudi Arabia, Iraq, Yemen and United Arab Emirates).

== Multiple and compound given names ==
In many Western cultures, people often have multiple given names. Most often the first one in sequence is the one that a person goes by, although exceptions are not uncommon, such as in the cases of Laura Jeanne Reese Witherspoon (Reese) and Dame Mary Barbara Hamilton Cartland (Barbara). The given name might also be used in compound form, as in, for example, John Paul or a hyphenated style like Bengt-Arne. A middle name might be part of a compound given name or might be, instead, a maiden name, a patronymic, or a baptismal name.

The signature of Alexander Graham Bell

In England, it was unusual for a person to have more than one given name until the seventeenth century when Charles James Stuart (King Charles I) was baptised with two names. That was a French fashion, which spread to the English aristocracy, following the royal example, then spread to the general population and became common by the end of the eighteenth century.

Double names are popular in the Southern United States.

Double names are also common among Vietnamese names to make repeated names in the family. For example, Đặng Vũ Minh Anh and Đặng Vũ Minh Ánh are two sisters with the given names Minh Anh and Minh Ánh.

In some cultures, there is a tradition to use the full name of a respectable person as an inseparable compound given name. An example includes Thomas Jefferson in honor of Thomas Jefferson, the third president of the United States.

Another tradition of compound given names are bilingual Hebrew-Yiddish tautological names, such as Aryeh Leib, where both parts mean "lion" in Hebrew and Yiddish respectively.

== Initials ==
Sometimes, a given name is used as just an initial, especially in combination with the middle initial (such as with H. G. Wells), and more rarely as an initial while the middle name is not one (such as with L. Ron Hubbard).

== Legal status ==
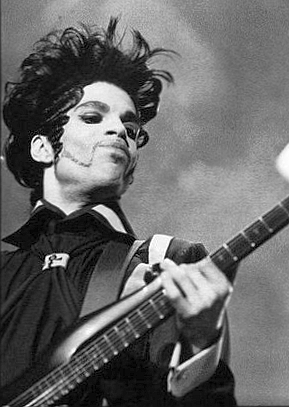
American musician Prince became mononymously known by his birth name before later changing his stage name to an unpronounceable symbol.

A child's given name or names are usually chosen by the parents soon after birth. If a name is not assigned at birth, one may be given at a naming ceremony, with family and friends in attendance. In most jurisdictions, a child's name at birth is a matter of public record, inscribed on a birth certificate, or its equivalent. In Western cultures, people normally retain the same given name throughout their lives. However, in some cases these names may be changed by following legal processes or by repute. People may also change their names when immigrating from one country to another with different naming conventions.

In certain jurisdictions, a government-appointed registrar of births may refuse to register a name for the reasons that it may cause a child harm, that it is considered offensive, or if it is deemed impractical. In France, the agency can refer the case to a local judge. Some jurisdictions, such as Sweden, restrict the spelling of names. (Note: Protesting Swedish naming laws, in 1996, two parents attempted to name their child Brfxxccxxmnpcccclllmmnprxvclmnckssqlbb11116, stating that it was "a pregnant, expressionistic development that we see as an artistic creation".) In Denmark, one does not need to register a given name for the child until the child is six months old, and in some cases, one can even wait a little longer than this before the child gets an official name.

== Origins and meanings ==
Parents may choose a name because of its meaning. This may be a personal or familial meaning, such as giving a child the name of an admired person, or it may be an example of nominative determinism, in which the parents give the child a name that they believe will be lucky or favourable for the child. Given names most often derive from the following categories:

- Aspirational personal traits (external and internal). For example, the male names:
  - Clement ("merciful");
  - Augustus ("consecrated, holy")
  - English examples include numerous female names such as Faith, Prudence, Amanda (Latin: worthy of love); Blanche (white (pure));
- Occupations, for example George means "earth-worker", i.e., "farmer".
- Circumstances of birth, for example:
  - Thomas meaning "twin";
  - Quintus (Latin: "fifth"), which was traditionally given to the fifth male child.
- Objects, for example Peter means "rock" and Edgar means "rich spear".
- Physical characteristics, for example Calvin means "bald".
- Variations on another name, especially to change the sex of the name (Pauline, Georgia) or to adapt from another language (for instance, the names Francis or Francisco that come from the name Franciscus meaning "Frank or Frenchman").
- Surnames can honour other branches of a family, where the surname would not otherwise be passed down (e.g., the mother's maiden surname). Modern examples include:
  - Winston,
  - Harrison,
  - Ross.
- Many were adopted from the 17th century in England to show respect to notable ancestry, usually given to nephews or male grandchildren of members of the great families concerned, from which the usage spread to general society. This was regardless of whether the family name concerned was in danger of dying out, for example with Howard, a family with many robust male lines over history. Notable examples include
  - Howard, from the Howard family, Dukes of Norfolk;
  - Courtenay, from the surname of the Earls of Devon;
  - Trevor, from the Welsh chieftain Tudor Trevor, lord of Hereford;
  - Clifford, from the Barons Clifford;
  - Digby, from the family of Baron Digby/Earl of Bristol;
  - Shirley (originally a man's forename), from the Shirley family, Earls Ferrer;
  - Percy, from the Percy Earls and Dukes of Northumberland;
  - Lindsay, from that noble Scottish family, Earls of Crawford;
  - Graham, from that noble Scottish family, Dukes of Montrose;
  - Eliot, from the Eliot family, Earls of St Germans;
  - Herbert, from the Herbert family, Earls of Pembroke;
  - Russell, from the Russell family, Earls and Dukes of Bedford;
  - Stanley, from the Stanley family, Earls of Derby;
  - Vernon, Earl of Shipbrook
  - Dillon, the Irish family of Dillon, Viscount Dillon
- Places, for example Brittany and Lorraine.
- Time of birth, for example, day of the week, as in Kofi Annan, whose given name means "born on Friday", or the holiday on which one was born, for example, the name Natalie meaning "born on Christmas day" in Latin (Noel (French "Christmas"), a name given to males born at Christmas); also April, May, or June.
- Combination of the above, for example the Armenian name Sirvart means "love rose".

In many cultures, given names are reused, especially to commemorate ancestors or those who are particularly admired, resulting in a limited repertoire of names that sometimes vary by orthography.

The most familiar example of this is the use of Biblical and saints' names in most of the Christian countries (with Ethiopia, in which names were often ideals or abstractions—Haile Selassie, "power of the Trinity"; Haile Miriam, "power of Mary"—as the most conspicuous exception). However, the name Jesus is considered taboo or sacrilegious in some parts of the Christian world, but in some Spanish-speaking countries, the name Jesus is considered a normal given name.

Similarly, the name Mary, now popular among Christians, particularly Roman Catholics, was considered too holy for secular use until about the 12th century. In countries that particularly venerated Mary, this remained the case much longer; in Poland, until the arrival in the 17th century of French queens named Marie.

Most common given names in English (and many other European languages) can be grouped into broad categories based on their origin:

- Hebrew names, most often from the Tanakh, are very common in, or are elements of names used in historically Christian countries. Some have elements meaning "God", such as "Eli". Examples: Michael, Naomi, Daniel, Abigail, David, Adam, Samuel, Elizabeth, Hannah, and Mary. There are also a handful of names in use derived from the Aramaic, particularly the names of prominent figures in the New Testament—such as Thomas, Martha, and Bartholomew.
  - All of the Semitic peoples of history and the present day use at least some names constructed like these in Hebrew (and the ancient Hebrews used names not constructed like these—such as Moses, probably an Egyptian name related to the names of Pharaohs like Thutmose and Ahmose). The Muslim world is the best-known example (with names like Saif-al-din, "sword of the faith", or Abd-Allah, "servant of God"), but even the Carthaginians had similar names: cf. Hannibal, "the grace of Melqart".
- Germanic names are characteristically warlike; roots with meanings like "glory", "strength", and "will" are common. The "-bert" element common in many such names comes from beraht, which means "bright". Examples: Robert, Edward, Roger, Richard, Albert, Carl, Alfred, Rosalind, Emma, Emmett, Eric, and Matilda.
- French forms of Germanic names. Since the Norman conquest of England, many English-given names of Germanic origin are used in their French forms. Examples: Charles, Henry, William.
- Celtic names are sometimes anglicised versions of Celtic forms, but the original form may also be used. Examples: Alan, Brian, Brigid, Mórag, Ross, Logan, Ciarán, Jennifer, and Seán. These names often have origins in Celtic words, as Celtic versions of the names of internationally known Christian saints, as names of Celtic mythological figures, or simply as long-standing names whose ultimate etymology is unclear.
- Greek names may be derived from the history and mythology of Classical Antiquity or be derived from the New Testament and early Christian traditions. Such names are often, but not always, anglicised. Examples: Helen, Stephen, Daphne, Alexander, Andrew, Athena, Gregory, George, Christopher, Margaret, Nicholas, Jason, Cassandra, Chloe, Zoë, Katherine, Penelope, and Theodore.
- Latin names can also be adopted unchanged, or modified; in particular, the inflected element can be dropped, as often happens in borrowings from Latin to English. Examples: Laura, Victoria, Mark (Latin Marcus), Justin (Latin Justinus), Paul (Lat. Paulus), Julius, Julia, Cecilia, Felix, Vivian.
- Slavic names may be of peaceful character, the compounds being derived from the word roots meaning "to protect", "to love", "peace", "to praise [gods]", or "to give". Examples: Milena, Vesna, Bohumil, Dobromir, Svetlana, Vlastimil. Other names have a warlike character and are built of words meaning "fighter", "war", or "anger". Examples: Casimir, Vladimir, Sambor, Wojciech and Zbigniew. Many of them derive from the root word "slava" ("glory"): Boleslav, Miroslav, Vladislav, Radoslav, Slavomir and Stanislav. Those derived from root word "mir" ("world, peace") are also popular: Casimir, Slavomir, Radomir, Vladimir, Miroslav, Jaczemir.
- Word names come from English vocabulary words. Feminine names of this sort—in more languages than English, and more cultures than Europe alone—frequently derive from nature, flowers, birds, colours, or gemstones. Examples include Jasmine, Lavender, Dawn, Daisy, Rose, Iris, Petunia, Rowan, Jade, Violet, and Sakura. Male names of this sort are less common—examples like Hunter and Cannon, or names associated with strong animals, such as Bronco and Wolf. (This is more common in some other languages, such as Northern Germanic and Turkish).
- Diminutives are shortened versions of names. They can be used to make it more quick to say, or to disambiguate multiple individuals with the same name. For example, Robert may be shortened to "Rob" or Cynthia shortened to "Cindy". In German the names Hänsel and Gretel (as in the famous fairy tale) are the diminutive forms of Johann and Margarete, respectively. Examples: Vicky, Tom, Abby, Allie.
- Shortened names (see nickname) are generally nicknames of a longer name, but they are instead given as a person's entire given name. For example, a man's full name may simply be "Jim", and it is not short for James. Examples: Beth, Ben, Kat, Sandy.

Frequently, a given name has versions in many languages. For example, Susanna also occurs in its original biblical Hebrew version, Shoshannah, its Spanish and Portuguese version Susana, its French version, Suzanne, its Polish version, Zuzanna, or its Hungarian version, Zsuzsanna.

Yohanan, a name of Hebrew origin, has many variants depending on the language.

=== East Asia ===
Despite the uniformity of Chinese surnames, some Chinese given names are fairly original because Chinese characters can be combined extensively. Unlike European languages, the Chinese language does not have a particular set of words reserved for given names; any combination of Chinese characters can theoretically be used as a given name. Nonetheless, a number of popular characters commonly recur, including "Strong" (伟, Wěi), "Learned" (文, Wén), "Peaceful" (安, Ān), and "Beautiful" (美, Měi). Despite China's increasing urbanization, several names such as "Pine" (松, Sōng) or "Plum" (梅, Méi) reference nature.

Most Chinese given names are two characters long and—despite the examples above—the two characters together may have no meaning. They may be selected to include particular sounds, tones, or radicals; to balance the Chinese elements of a child's birth chart; or to honor a generation poem handed down through the family for centuries. Traditionally, it is considered an affront, not an honor, to have a newborn named after an older relative and so full names are rarely passed down through a family in the manner of American English Seniors, Juniors, III, etc. Similarly, it is considered disadvantageous for the child to bear a name already made famous by someone else through romanizations, where a common name like Liu Xiang may be borne by tens of thousands.

Korean names and Vietnamese names are often simply conventions derived from Classical Chinese names.

Many female Japanese names end in -ko (子), such as Aiko and Akiko. This element usually means "child" on its own, but when used in given names can have a feminine (adult) connotation.

In many Westernised Asian locations, many Asians also have an unofficial or even registered Western (typically English) given name, in addition to their Asian given name. This is also true for Asian students at colleges in countries such as the United States, Canada, and Australia as well as among international businesspeople.

== Gender ==
Most names are usually masculine (Hugo, Keith, Harold, Riku, Ren, Haruto) or feminine (Maeve, Charlotte, Jane, Mio, Miyuki, Yui), but there are unisex names as well, such as Jordan, Jamie, Morgan, Leslie, Jackie, Pat, Dana, Alex, Sam, Hinata, Makoto, Yuki, etc. Often, use for one gender is predominant. Also, a particular spelling is often more common for either men or women, even if the pronunciation is the same.

Many culture groups, past and present, did not or do not gender their names strongly; thus, many or all of their names are unisex. On the other hand, in many languages including most Indo-European languages (but not English), gender is inherent in the grammar. Some countries have laws preventing unisex names, requiring parents to give their children sex-specific names. Names may have different gender connotations from country to country or language to language.

Within anthroponymic classification, names of human males are called andronyms (from Ancient Greek ἀνήρ / man, and ὄνυμα [ὄνομα] / name), while names of human females are called gynonyms (from Ancient Greek γυνή / woman, and ὄνυμα [ὄνομα] / name).

== Popularity ==
Most popular US baby names from 1880 to 2012

The popularity (frequency) distribution of given names typically follows a power law distribution.

Since about 1800 in England and Wales and in the U.S., the popularity distribution of given names has been shifting so that the most popular names are losing popularity. For example, in England and Wales, the most popular female and male names given to babies born in 1800 were Mary and John, with 24% of female babies and 22% of male babies receiving those names, respectively. In contrast, the corresponding statistics for England and Wales in 1994 were Emily and James, with 3% and 4% of names, respectively. The overall distribution of names has also changed significantly over the last 100 years for males, and females to a much larger extent. This has led to an increasing amount of diversity for female names.

=== Choice of names ===
Education, ethnicity, religion, class, and political ideology affect parents' choice of names. Politically conservative parents choose common and traditional names, while politically liberal parents may choose the names of literary characters or other relatively obscure cultural figures. Devout members of religions often choose names from their religious scriptures. For example, Hindu parents may name a daughter Saanvi after the goddess, Jewish parents may name a son Isaac after one of the earliest ancestral figures, and Muslim parents may name a son Mohammed after the prophet Mohammed.

There are many tools parents can use to choose names, including books, websites and applications. An example is the Baby Name Game that uses the Elo rating system to rank parents preferred names and help them select one.

=== Influence of popular culture ===
Popular culture appears to have an influence on naming trends, at least in the United States and United Kingdom. Newly famous celebrities and public figures may influence the popularity of names. For example, in 2004, the names "Keira" and "Kiera" (anglicisation of Irish name Ciara) respectively became the 51st and 92nd most popular girls' names in the UK, following the rise in popularity of British actress Keira Knightley. Also, the female name "Miley" which before was not in the top 1000 was 278th most popular in 2007, following the rise to fame of singer-actress Miley Cyrus.

Influence of TV series on given names in England and Wales from 1996 to 2021

Characters from fiction also seem to influence naming. After the name Kayla was used for a character on the American soap opera Days of Our Lives, the name's popularity increased greatly. The name Tammy, and the related Tamara became popular after the movie Tammy and the Bachelor came out in 1957. Some names were established or spread by being used in literature. Notable examples include Pamela, invented by Sir Philip Sidney for a pivotal character in his epic prose work, The Countess of Pembroke's Arcadia; Jessica, created by William Shakespeare in his play The Merchant of Venice; Vanessa, created by Jonathan Swift; Fiona, a character from James Macpherson's spurious cycle of Ossian poems; Wendy, an obscure name popularised by J. M. Barrie in his play Peter Pan, or The Boy Who Wouldn't Grow Up; and Madison, a character from the movie Splash. Lara and Larissa were rare in America before the appearance of Doctor Zhivago, and have become fairly common since.

Songs can influence the naming of children. Jude jumped from 814th most popular male name in 1968 to 668th in 1969, following the release of the Beatles' "Hey Jude". Similarly, Layla charted as 969th most popular in 1972 after the Eric Clapton song. It had not been in the top 1,000 before. Kayleigh became a particularly popular name in the United Kingdom following the release of a song by the British rock group Marillion. Government statistics in 2005 revealed that 96% of Kayleighs were born after 1985, the year in which Marillion released "Kayleigh".

Popular culture figures need not be admirable in order to influence naming trends. For example, Peyton came into the top 1000 as a female given name for babies in the United States for the first time in 1992 (at #583), immediately after it was featured as the name of an evil nanny in the film The Hand That Rocks the Cradle. On the other hand, historical events can influence child-naming. For example, the given name Adolf has fallen out of use since the end of World War II in 1945.

In contrast with this anecdotal evidence, a comprehensive study of Norwegian first name datasets shows that the main factors that govern first name dynamics are endogenous. Monitoring the popularity of 1,000 names over 130 years, the authors have identified only five cases of exogenous effects, three of them are connected to the names given to the babies of the Norwegian royal family.

=== 20th century African-American names ===
Since the civil rights movement of 1950–1970, African-American names given to children have strongly mirrored sociopolitical movements and philosophies in the African-American community. Since the 1970s neologistic (creative, inventive) practices have become increasingly common and the subject of academic study.

== See also ==
- Arabic name
- Hypocorism or pet name
- List of most popular given names (in many countries and cultures)
- Maiden and married names
- Name day
- Nickname
- Onomastics
- Personal name
- Popularity of birth names for females (United States)
- Popularity of birth names for males (United States)
- Praenomen
- Pseudonym
- Saint's name
- Slave name
- Thai name – somewhat special treatment of given names
- Theophoric name
- Bilingual tautological given names

== Sources ==
- Barolini, Teodolinda, ed. (2005). Medieval Constructions in Gender And Identity: Essays in Honor of Joan M. Ferrante. Tempe: Arizona Center for Medieval and Renaissance Studies. ISBN 978-0-86698-337-2.
- Bourin, Monique; Martínez Sopena, Pascual, eds. (2010). Anthroponymie et migrations dans la chrétienté médiévale [Anthroponymy and Migrations in Medieval Christianity]. Madrid: Casa de Velázquez. ISBN 978-84-96820-33-3.
- Bruck, Gabriele vom; Bodenhorn, Barbara, eds. (2009) [2006]. An Anthropology of Names and Naming (2nd ed.). Cambridge: Cambridge University Press.
- Fraser, Peter M. (2000). "Ethnics as Personal Names". Greek Personal Names: Their Value as Evidence (PDF). Oxford: Oxford University Press. pp. 149–157. Archived from the original (PDF) on 18 October 2019.
- Room, Adrian (1996). An Alphabetical Guide to the Language of Name Studies. Lanham and London: The Scarecrow Press. ISBN 978-0-8108-3169-8.
- Ziolkowska, Magdalena (2011). "Anthroponomy as an Element Identifying National Minority". Eesti ja Soome-Ugri Keeleteaduse Ajakiri. 2 (1): 383–398. doi:10.12697/jeful.2011.2.1.25. Archived from the original on 19 March 2024.
