= Xiangzhou =

Xiangzhou may refer to:

- Xiangzhou District, Zhuhai (香洲区), Guangdong
- Xiangzhou District, Xiangyang (襄州区), Hubei
- Xiangzhou County (象州县), subdivision of Laibin, Guangxi

== Towns ==
- Xiangzhou, Tiandong County (祥周镇), subdivision of Tiandong County, Guangxi
- Xiangzhou, Xiangzhou County, subdivision and seat of Xiangzhou County, Guangxi
- Xiangzhou, Shandong (相州镇), subdivision of Zhucheng, Shandong

== See also ==
- Xiang (disambiguation)
