= Slavomir Miletić =

Serbian sculptor (1930–2022)

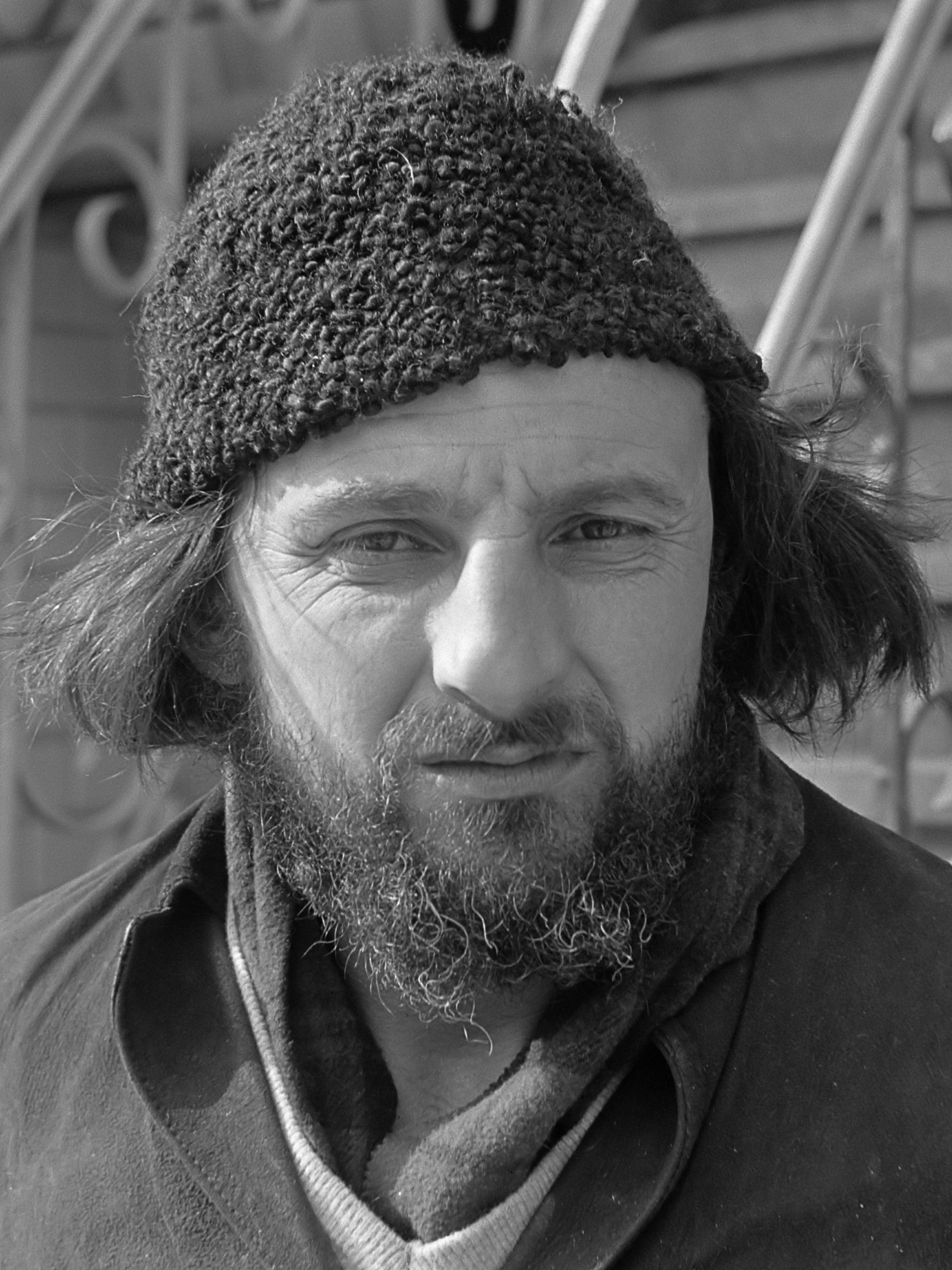
- Photo of Miletić from 1969
- Born: 1930; Bošnjane, Kingdom of Yugoslavia
- Died: 2022 (aged 91–92)
- Notable work: De Houtwerker; De Vredesraket

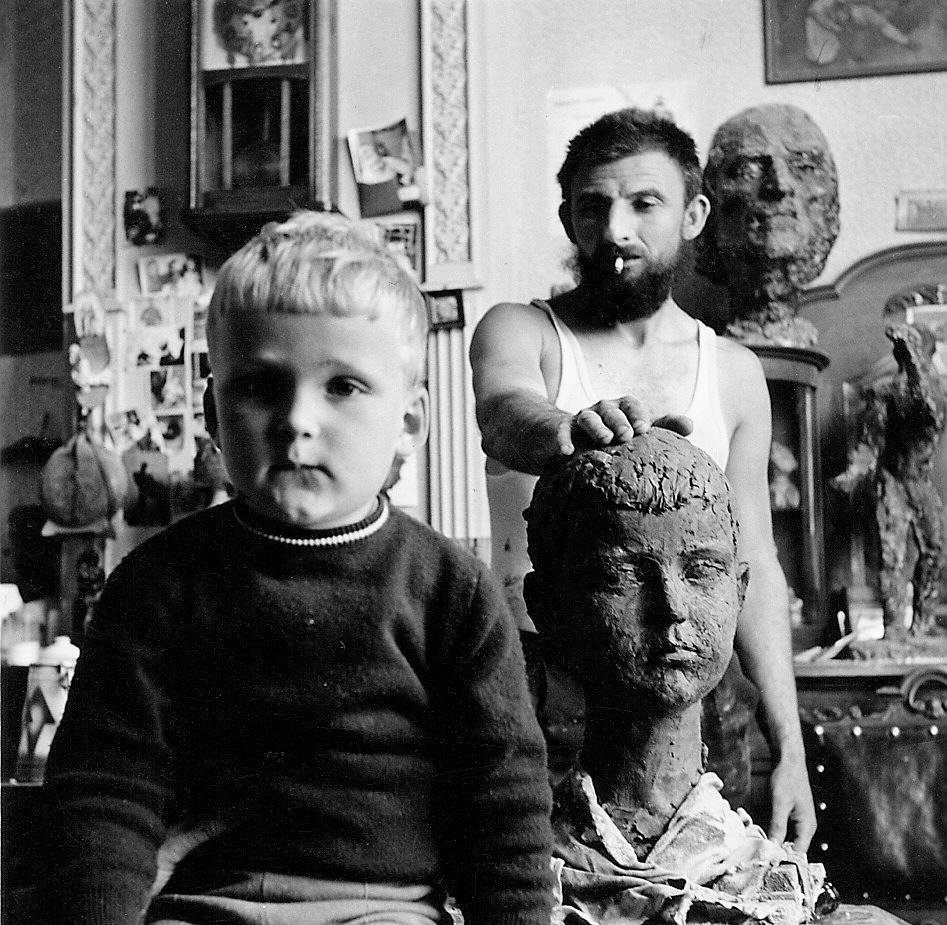
Miletić with a young model

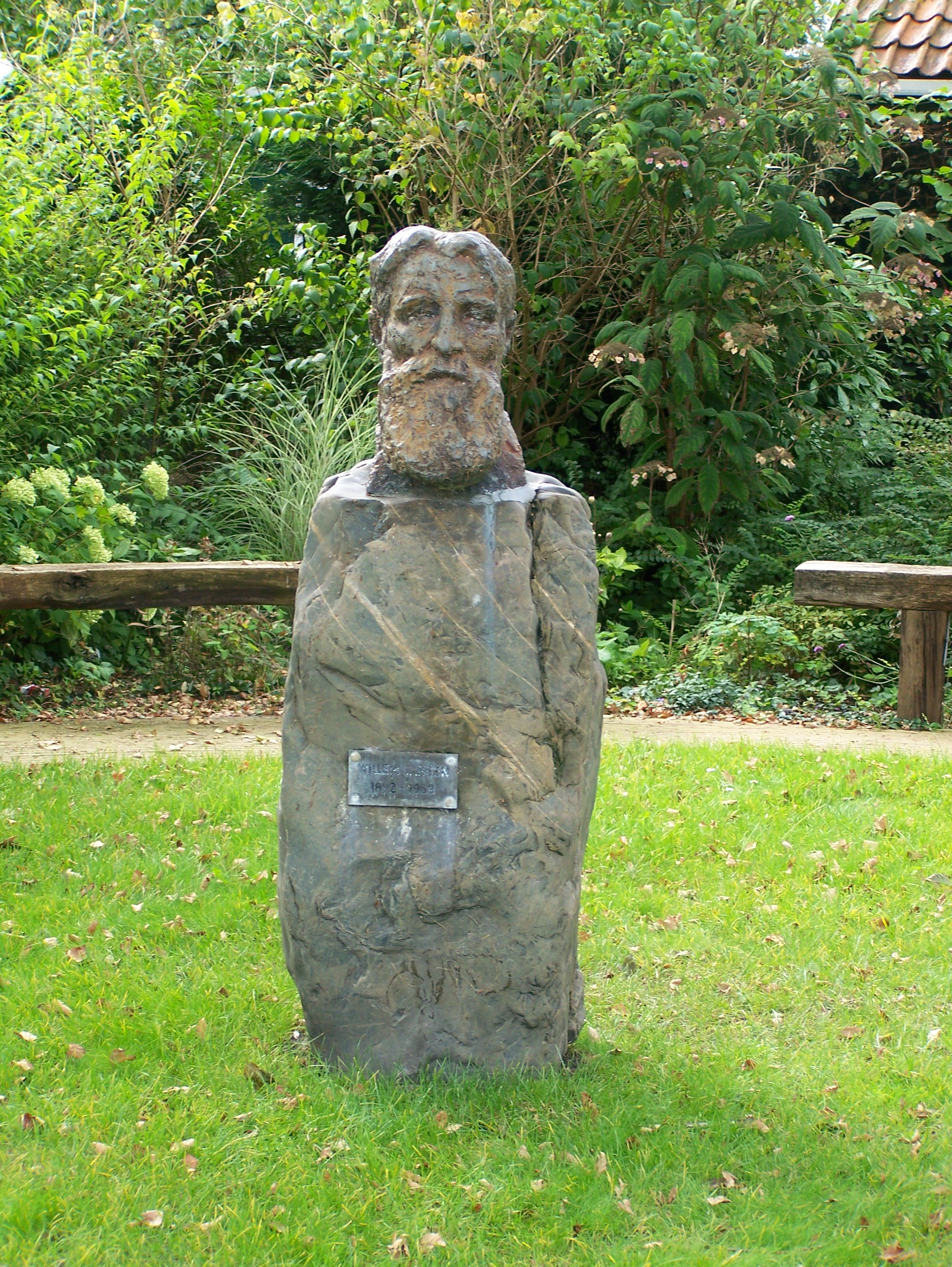
Bust of painter Willem Jansen (1892-1969) made by Slavomir Miletić in 1963. Placed at the corner of the J.J. Allenstraat and the Watermolenstraat in Westzaan.

Slavomir Miletić (Serbian Cyrillic: Славомир Милетић; 1930–2022) was a Serbian sculptor, who lived in the Netherlands. He attended the Académie des Beaux-Arts de l'Institut de France. He was noted for his sometimes large works, characterized by a rough style, and for occasionally provoking controversy.

== Career ==
In Yugoslavia, Slavomir Miletić studied at Arts Academy of Belgrade. In 1959, Miletić won a scholarship to the Académie des Beaux-Arts in Paris. He studied there for two years. He had a few exhibitions in Paris. He married Elisabeth Toutenhoofd, from The Hague, who received painting lessons in France. They moved to the Netherlands in 1960.

Media-acclaimed exhibitions in Galerie Loujetsky in The Hague and De Drie Hendricken in Amsterdam did not lead to any sales. At the age of 32, on the brink of being expelled as an artist without money, he started working as a packer at the Honig food plant in Koog aan de Zaan. Director Paul Honig read an article in a Zaandam magazine about the artist's hardships and gave him his first assignment. One month later, a concrete male figure stood in front of Honig's new building: a laborer carrying a heavy burden.

=== The Woodworker ===
The artwork for Honig was received so positively that the Zaandam municipal council commissioned him for 15,000 guilders to make a statue for the new Beatrix Bridge. While Miletić was still working on the preparatory clay model, his artwork was rejected by the city. After an appeal, a committee also disapproved of the sculpture. Miletic nevertheless continued to work on the model. The municipality then decided to evacuate his workshop (a shed in an old gas factory), after which a fight ensued between supporters and opponents of Miletić.

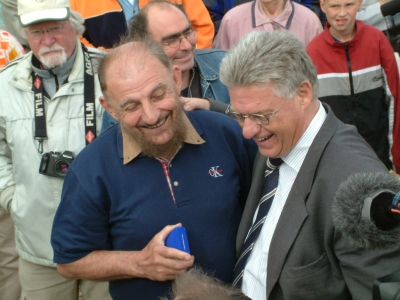
Miletic (left) and Mayor Vreeman of Zaandam at the re-unveiling of De Houtwerker in 2004

With the molds that were later intended to cast the statue in bronze, Miletić made a concrete copy of De Houtwerker. This sculpture was placed in Amsterdam along the road to Zaandam. Later, the Woodworker was moved to Haarlemmerplein to finally end up on Waterlooplein.

In 1986, the 100-year-old newspaper De Zaanlander still tried to get a bronze copy of the statue in Zaandam, but the municipality did not want to make a place available and the budget also did not add up. In 1994, the concrete statue was moved to Zaandam. In 2002, this concrete statue was temporarily placed at the Zaans Museum. In 2004, a bronze copy was finally unveiled by Mayor Ruud Vreeman, in the presence of Miletić, on the Houthavenkade in Zaandam. The concrete copy has since been moved to the Art Center of Zaandam.

=== The Peace Rocket ===
In 1981, on the eve of the anti-nuclear weapons demonstration of 21 November 1981, a tall sculpture was placed on Museumplein. It was removed in 1995.
