= Xiang =

Xiang or Hsiang may refer to:

- Xiang (place), the site of Hong Xiuquan's destruction of a Chinese idol early in the Taiping Rebellion
- Xiang (surname), three unrelated surnames: Chinese: 項 and Chinese: 向 (both Xiàng) and Chinese: 相 (Xiāng)
- Xiang Chinese, a group of Chinese varieties spoken in Hunan
- Xiang Island (simplified Chinese: 响沙; traditional Chinese: 響沙; pinyin: Xiǎngshā), a former island in the Yangtze estuary now forming part of Chongming Island in Shanghai
- Xiang River, river in South China
- Hunan, abbreviated in Chinese as 湘 (Xiāng), a province of China
- Xiang, capital of the Shang dynasty during the reign of He Dan Jia

== People with the name ==
=== Xiang ===
- Half-brother of legendary Chinese leader Emperor Shun
- Xiang of Xia (3rd millennium BC), fifth ruler of the semi-legendary Xia dynasty
- Duke Xiang of Song (died 637 BC), a ruler of Sòng in the Spring and Autumn period
- Duke Xiang of Jin (died 621 BC), a ruler of Jin
- King Xiang of Zhou (died 619 BC), king of the Zhou dynasty
- Liu Xiang (disambiguation)
- Alice Xiang, global head of AI governance at Sony

=== Hsiang ===
- Mina Hsiang (born 1981), administrator of the United States Digital Service
- Solomon Hsiang, scientist and economist
- Wu-Chung Hsiang (born 1935), Chinese-American mathematician
- Wu-Yi Hsiang (born 1937), Chinese-American mathematician; see Kepler conjecture

== See also ==
- Xiang Army raised in Hunan by Zeng Guofan during the Qing dynasty
- Townships of the People's Republic of China and Taiwan (simplified Chinese: 乡; traditional Chinese: 鄉; pinyin: xiāng)
