= Bošnjane =

Bošnjane may refer to:

- Bošnjane (Paraćin), a village in Serbia
- Bošnjane (Rača), a village in Serbia
- Bošnjane (Varvarin), a village in Serbia
