= Slavomir =

Slavic masculine given name

Slavomir / Slavomír
- Pronunciation: Serbo-Croatian: [slâʋomiːr] Czech: [ˈslavomiːr] Slovak: [ˈslavɔmiːr]
- Gender: masculine

Origin
- Origin: Slavic
- Meaning: slava ("glory, fame") + mir ("peace, world")

Other names
- Alternative spelling: Slavomír
- Nicknames: Slavo, Slávek and Slavko
- Related names: Sławomir, Miroslav

Slavomir (Cyrillic: Славомир) is a Slavic masculine given name. It is written Slavomir in Croatian and Serbian and Slavomír in Czech and Slovak. The Polish form of the name is Sławomir.

Th name consists of the Slavic elements slav- (slava, 'glory', 'fame') and mir ("peace, world").

The feminine form of the name is Slavomira or Slavomíra. Nicknames for the name include Slavo, Slávek and Slavko.

Notable people with the name include:

- Slavomir of Moravia, medieval duke
- Slavomir (Obotrite prince) (died 821), legendary tribal prince of the Obotrites
- Slavomír Bališ (born 1985), Slovak football player
- Slavomír Bartoň (1926–2004), Czech ice hockey player
- Slavomir Gvozdenovici (born 1953), Romanian-Serbian writer, poet and politician
- Slavomír Kňazovický (born 1967), Slovak sprint canoeist
- Slavomír Kica (born 1984), Slovak football player
- Slavomir Miletić (1930–2022), Serbian sculptor
- Slavomir Miklovš (1934–2011), Croatian cleric
- Slavomír Pagáč (born 1997), Slovak footballer
- Slavomír Pavličko (born 1972), Slovak ice hockey player
- Jan Slavomír Tomíček (1806–1866), Czech writer
- Slavomir Vorobel (born 1971), Slovak ice hockey player

== See also ==
- Sławomir, Polish variant of the name
- Miroslav
