= Ratajczyk =

Ratajczyk is a Polish surname. Notable people with the surname include:

- Adam Ratajczyk (born 2002), Polish footballer
- Krzysztof Ratajczyk (born 1973), Polish footballer
- Peter Thomas Ratajczyk (1962–2010), a.k.a. Peter Steele, singer and bassguitar player of Type O Negative
- Rafał Ratajczyk (born 1983), Polish cyclist

== See also ==
- Ratajczak
