= Slavo =

Slavo is a South Slavic given name. Notable people with the name include:

- Slavo Kukić (21 July 1954 – 7 September 2024) was a Bosnian sociologist and academic
- Slavo Polugić (born 1983) is a Swiss heavyweight kickboxer of Serbian and Croatian descent
