= Sławomir Szwedowski =

Polish economist

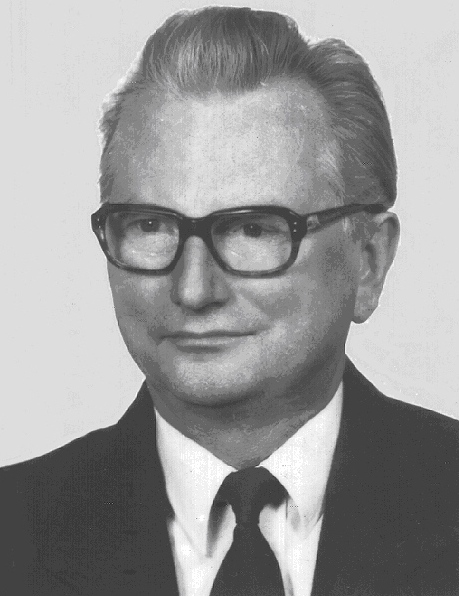
Sławomir Szwedowski (1928-2000)

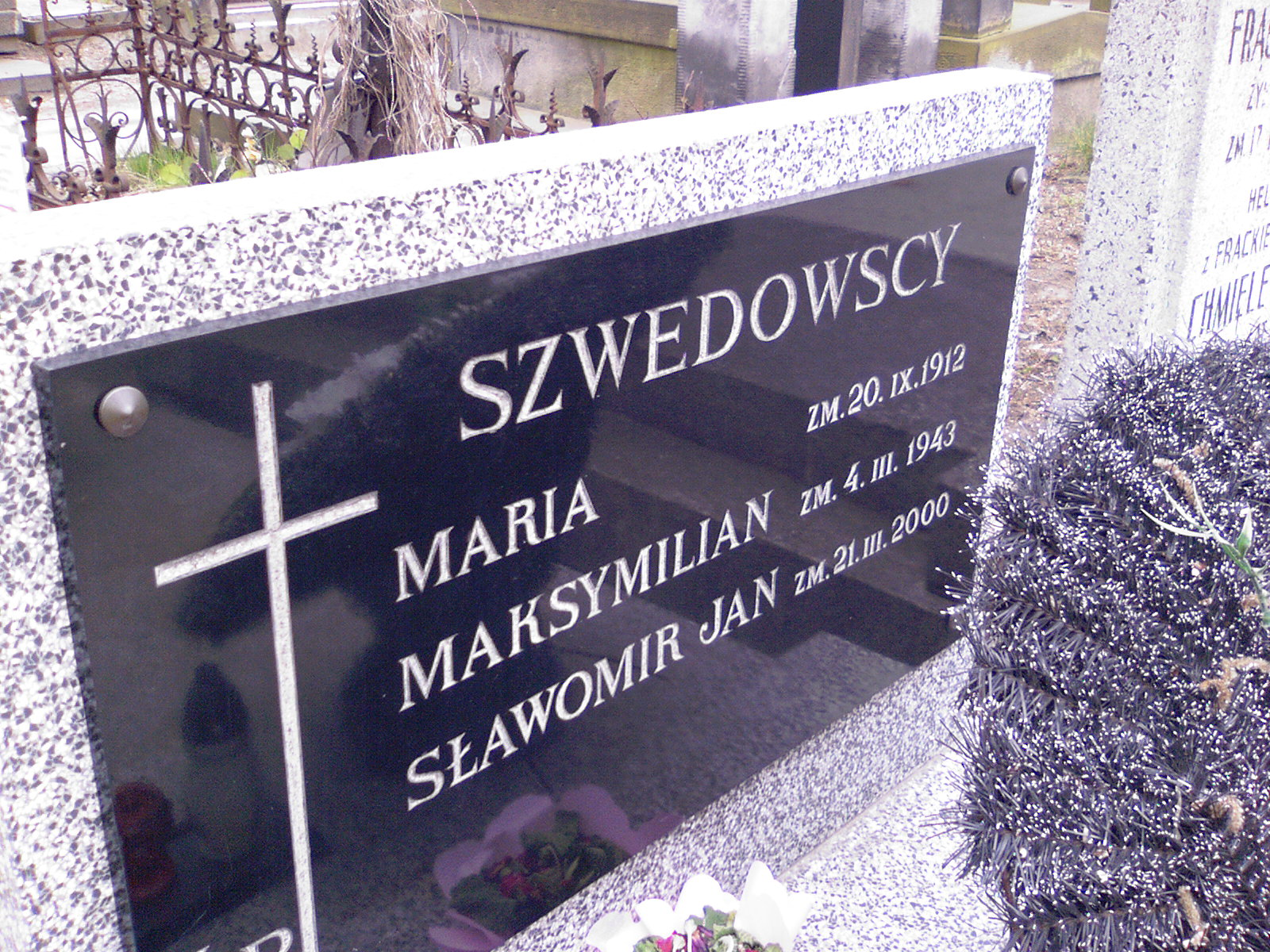
Old Powązki Cemetery in Warsaw

Sławomir Szwedowski (1928–2000) was a Polish economist, professor at the Institute of Economic Sciences of the Polish Academy of Sciences.

Until 1990, he was the financial director of the Institute (the head director was Professor Jozef Pajestka and Professor Cezary Jozefiak). From 1994 to 1997, he was the science director (the head director at the time was Professor (former Prime Minister) Marek Belka). In addition, he was a member of the Science Council of the Institute.

Selected scientific papers:

- Methods of measuring the efficiency of scientific and technical progress, 1976
- The politics and economics of scientific and technical progress, 1986
- Problems in technical progress, 1976
- The rationality and effectiveness of mechanisms of steering scientific and technical progress, 1991

He was published in the publications Gospodarka Polski [The Polish Economy] and Studia Ekonomiczne [Economic Studies], among others.

== See also ==
- List of Poles
- Szwedowski of Korwin coat of arms
