= Xiang (place) =

Site of Hong Xiuquan's destruction of a Chinese idol early in the Taiping Rebellion

Xiang was a place in Guangxi province where there was an idol to Gan. Feeling that Gan was an embodiment of immorality and other evils, Hong Xiuquan, Lu Liu and Feng Yunshan destroyed the idol and desecrated the temple to Gan in the 1840s.

Xiang later became one of the early bases of the Taiping.

== See also ==
- Xiang Army
- Xiang Rong

== Sources ==
Spence, Jonathan. God's Chinese Son (New York: W. W. Norton and Co., 1996) p. 100, 110
