= Slavoljub =

Slavic masculine given name

- Pronunciation: Serbo-Croatian: [slâʋoʎuːb]
- Gender: masculine

Origin
- Language: Slavic
- Origin: slava (glory) and ljub (love)
- Meaning: one who loves glory
- Region of origin: Eastern Europe

Other names
- Alternative spelling: Slavolub
- Related names: Ljuboslav

Slavoljub (Cyrillic: Славољуб) is a Slavic masculine given name used in South Slavic languages, especially Serbian.

The name is composed of the Slavic elements -slav- (slava, 'glory') and ljub ("love"), thus meaning "glorious love" or "one who loves glory". Common nicknames for people named Slavoljub are Slava, Slavko and Ljuba.

== Notable people with the name ==
- Slavoljub Đorđević (born 1981), Serbian footballer
- Slavoljub Filipović (1951–2025), Serbian politician
- Slavoljub Gorunović (born 1970), Serbian basketball coach
- Slavoljub Janković (born 1969), Serbian footballer
- Slavoljub Marjanović (born 1955), Serbian chess player
- Slavoljub Mitov (born 1961), Serbian politician
- Slavoljub Muslin (born 1953), Serbian football player and manager
- Slavoljub Nikolić (born 1960), Serbian footballer
- Slavoljub Paunović (born 1947), Serbian football player and manager
- Slavoljub Eduard Penkala (1871–1922), Croatian engineer and inventor
- Slavoljub Srnić (born 1992), Serbian footballer
- Slavko Vorkapić, Serbian-American film director and editor

== See also ==
- Slavoliub Adnagi (born 1965), Serbian-Romanian politician
