= De Drie Hendricken =

Trio of 17th-century townhouses in Amsterdam

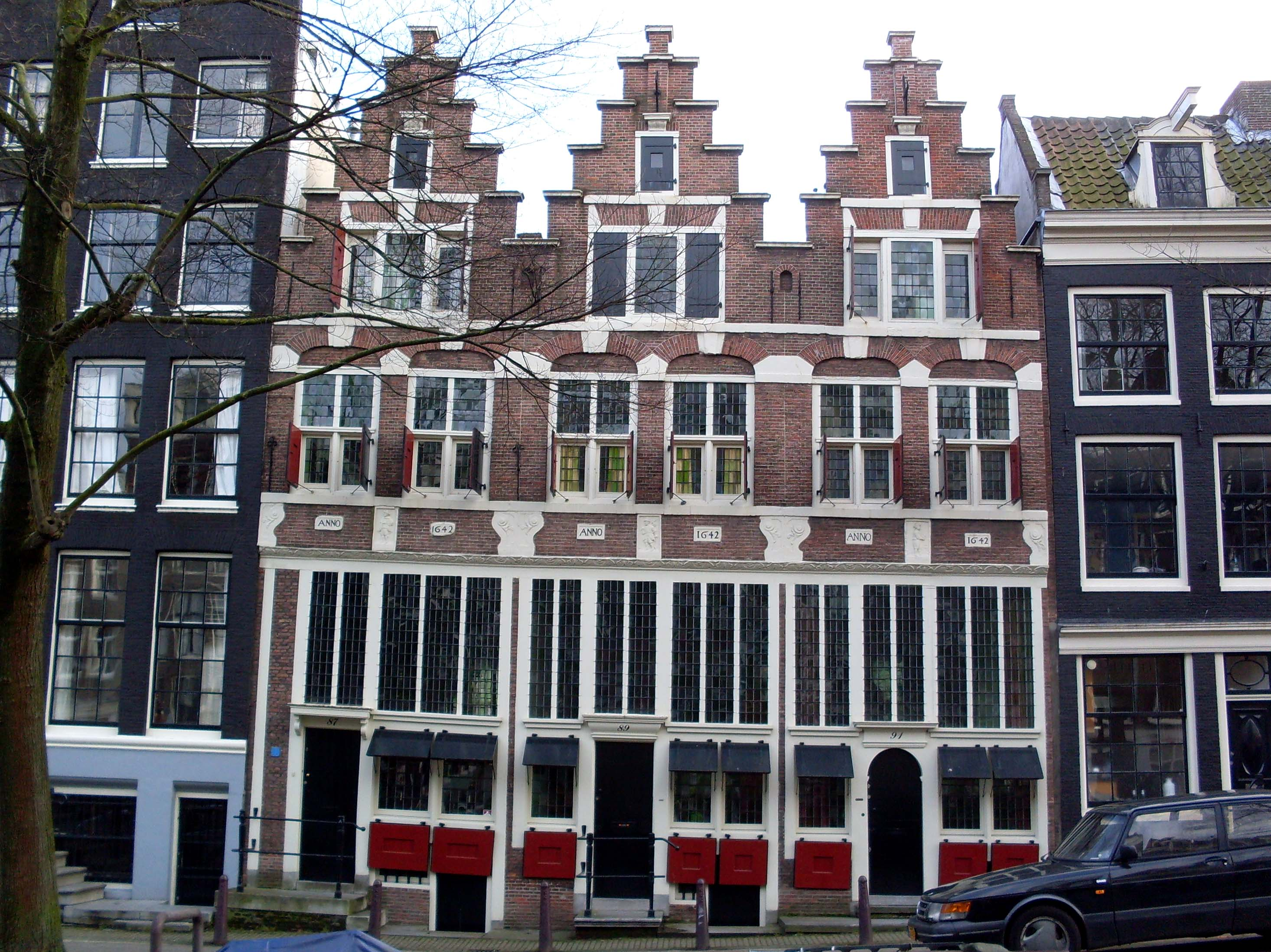
- The three stepped gable houses on Bloemgracht canal
- Interactive map of the De Drie Hendricken area

General information
- Location: Bloemgracht 87, 89 and 91, Amsterdam
- Coordinates: 52°22′27.49″N 4°52′46.75″E
- Year built: 1642
- Owner: Vereniging Hendrick de Keyser

De Drie Hendricken ("The Three Henries") are a trio of 17th-century townhouses on Bloemgracht canal in the Jordaan district of Amsterdam. The three stepped gable houses from 1642 in Amsterdam Renaissance style are characterized by their nearly identical facades and gable stones named De Steeman (the townsman), De Landman (the farmer) and De Seeman (the sailor).

The three buildings form an example of the Amsterdam zaalhuis with recessed hearth and parlor, and are regarded as a didactically valuable ensemble for the study of 17th-century urban architecture. The buildings were designated as separate rijksmonumenten (national heritage monuments) in 1970 under numbers 531 (Bloemgracht 87), 532 (89) and 533 (91).

== Description ==
The stepped gables feature natural stone bands and blocks, date stones with the year ANNO 1642 and three gable stones in the frieze. Below the stepped gables is a projecting beam (puibalk) and a 17th-century wooden base with cross windows featuring leaded glass and shutters, reconstructed during the 1946/47 restoration based on building traces.

The interior was also restored to a 17th-century layout, including a tall front room (voorhuis), spiral staircase, parlor (opkamer) and lower kitchen by the original recessed hearth.

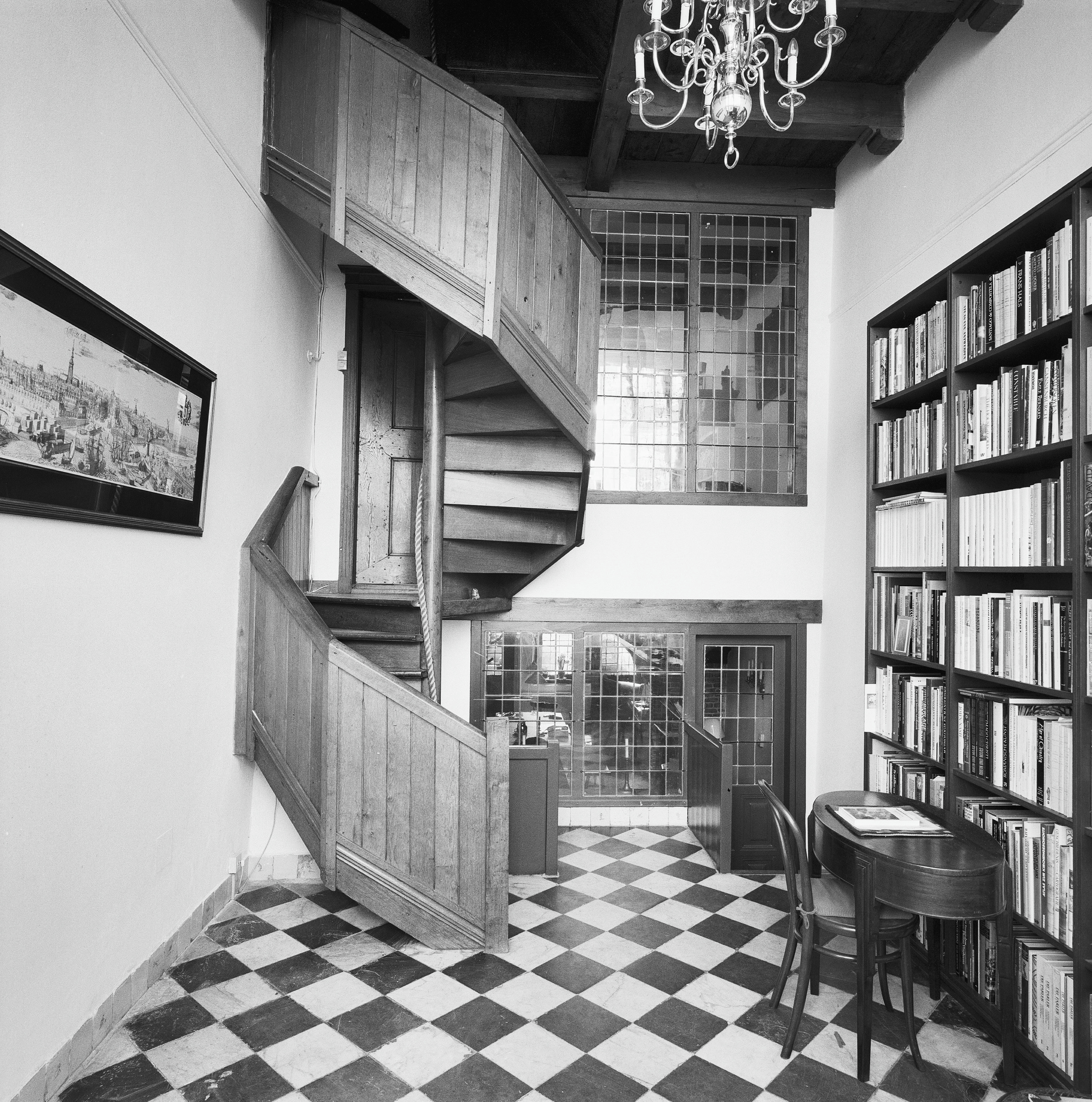
Front room of Bloemgracht 89 in 1994

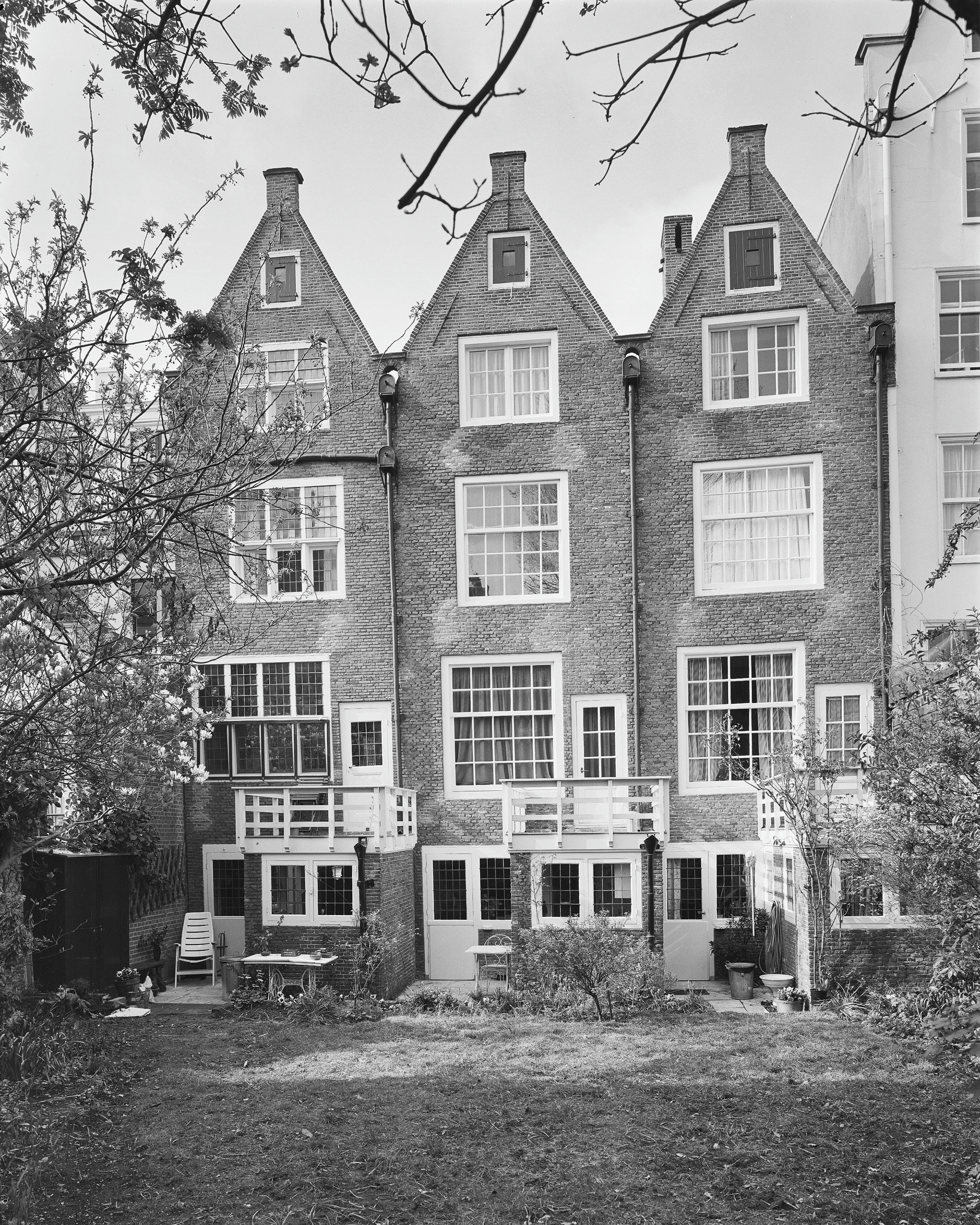
Back facades in 1994

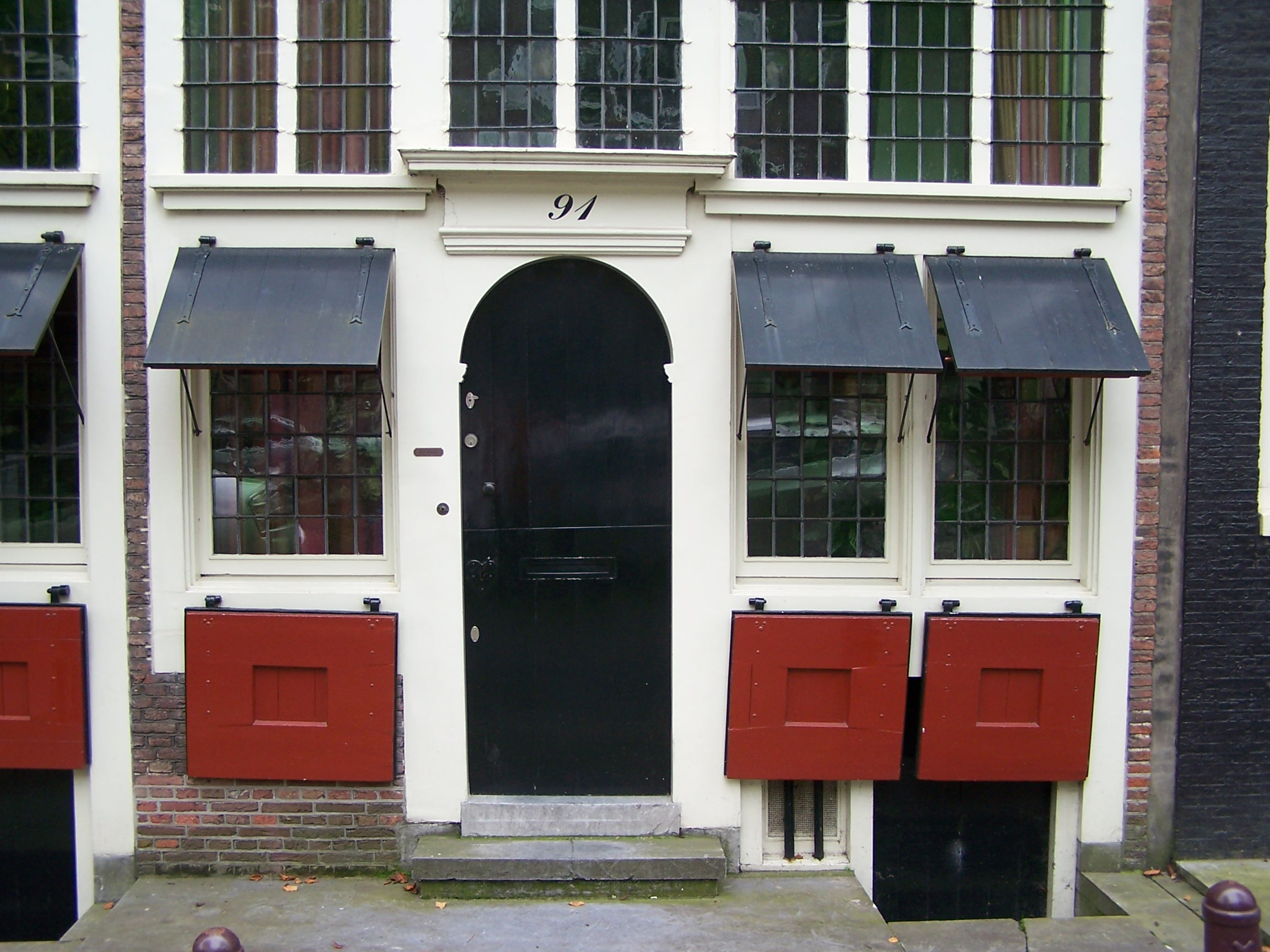
Wooden base of Bloemgracht 91

== Gable stones ==
The three gable stones depict De Steeman (the townsman), De Landman (the farmer) and De Seeman (the sailor). They symbolize three ways of life in 17th-century Dutch society: urban life, rural existence and seafaring. Contrary to common assumption, the figures do not refer to the occupations of the original residents. The names were only added to the bottom edges of the stones in later centuries. The current colouring is based on 17th-century paintings by among others Pieter de Hooch, Adriaen van Ostade and Jan Steen, and was determined during restoration by sculptor Wil Abels.

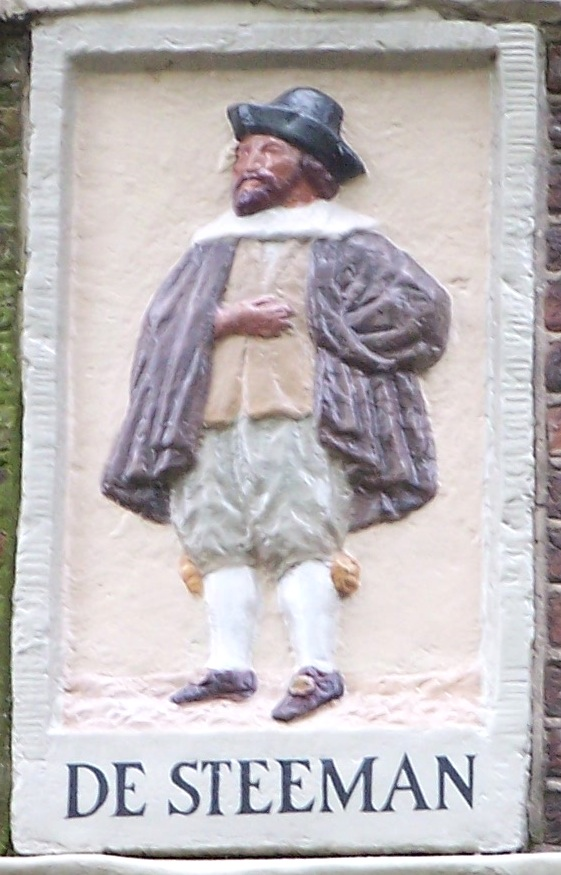
De Steeman (Bloemgracht 87)

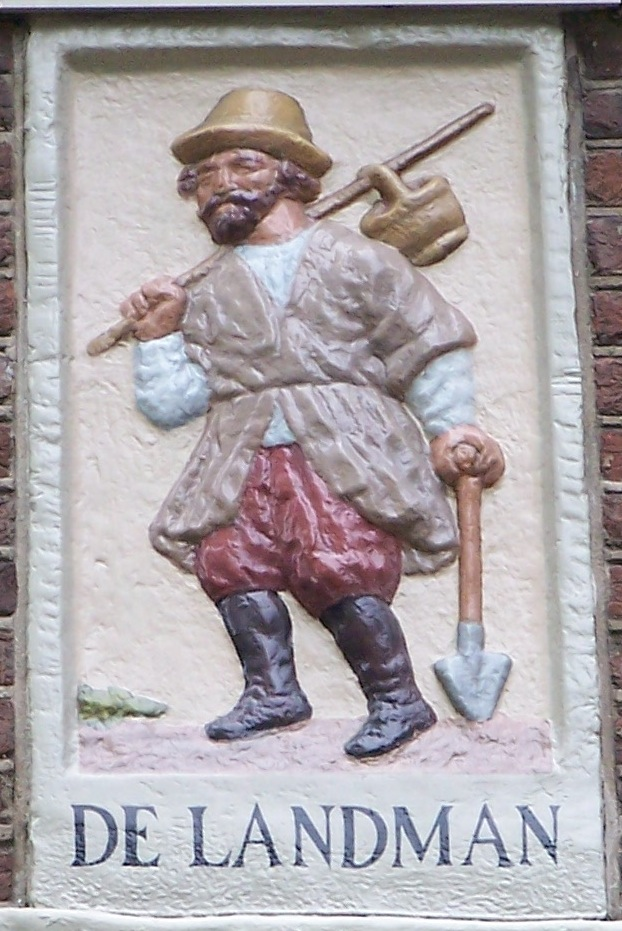
De Landman (Bloemgracht 89)

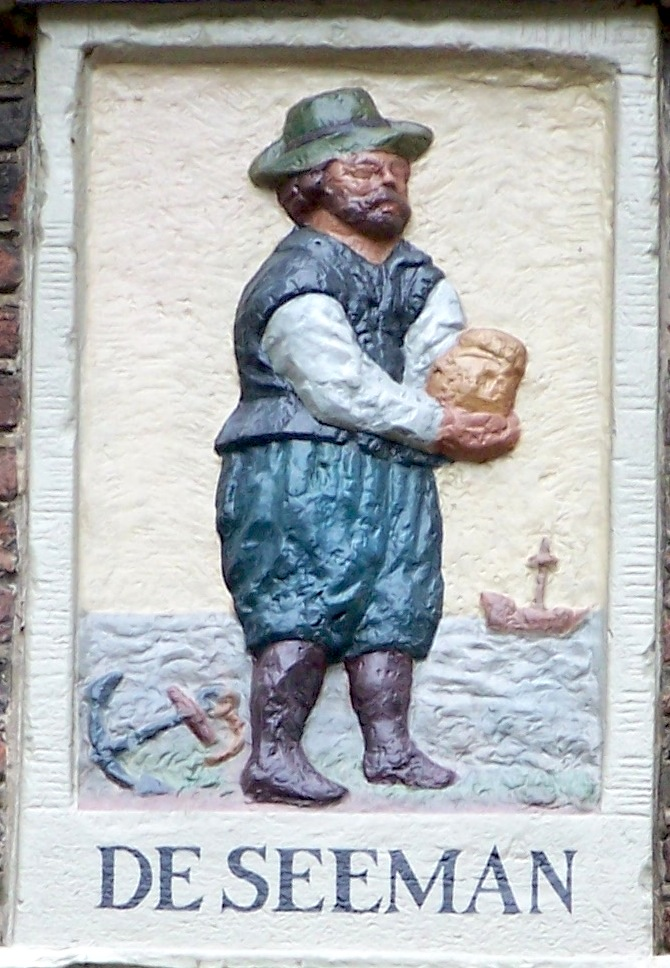
De Seeman (Bloemgracht 91)

== History ==
By the early 20th century, the buildings had severely deteriorated. They were acquired by local heritage foundation Vereniging Hendrick de Keyser in 1927–1929. Between 1942 and 1947, architect Jan de Meijer carried out a thorough restoration. The 17th-century layout was largely reconstructed, including tall front room, spiral staircase, parlor and lower kitchen. The old 19th-century bases were replaced by reconstructions with cross windows and leaded glass. The decision to "restore to the original state" was a topic of debate in heritage conservation at the time.
