= Sławomir Rynkiewicz =

Slawomir Rynkiewicz Berg
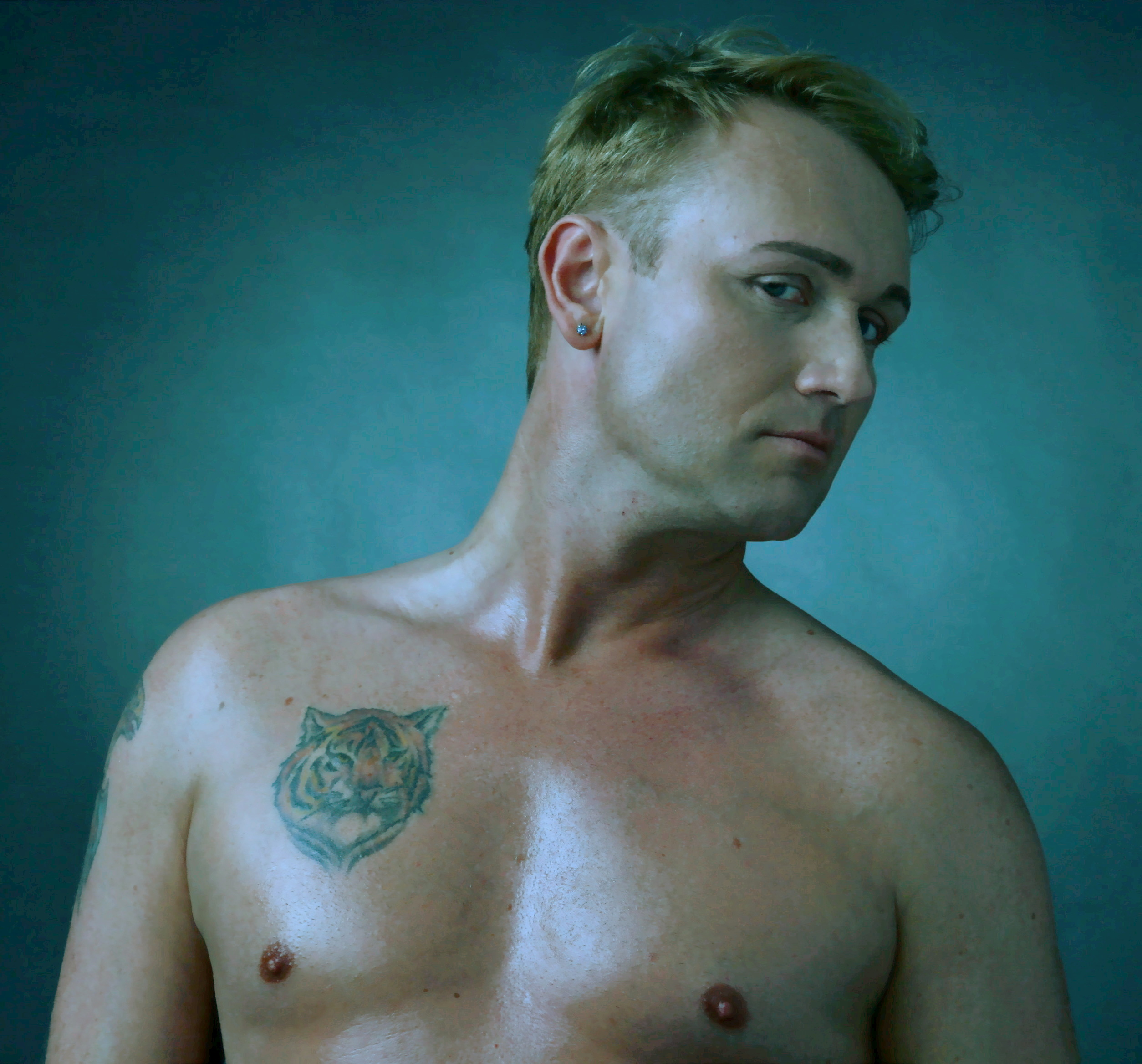
- Born: Slawomir Stanislaw Rynkiewicz; 19 November 1970 (age 54); Gdańsk, Poland
- Occupation(s): Television personality, actor, model, record producer
- Television: reality-show "Waterwörld"; Solsidan (TV series); 69 saker du vill veta om sex

Sławomir Rynkiewicz Berg (born 19 November 1970) is a Polish-born Swedish film, television actor. He came to Stockholm in 1992. Rynkiewicz graduated from the Kulturama School in Stockholm

== Selected filmography ==
- 2018: Sjölyckan, directed by Niclas Carlsson
- 2012: "Shoo Bre", directed by Djengo Esmer
- 2012: "Den sista dokusåpan", directed by Oskar Mellander
- 2009: "Solsidan", directed by Felix Herngren
- 2009: "Inga Lindström", directed by John Delbridge
- 2009: "Våra vänners liv", directed by Jesper Andersson
- 2002: "The biggest car show in the World: 25th annual POWER BIG MEET"

== Television ( TV show) ==
- 2012: "69 saker du vill veta om sex" TV3
- 2011: reality-show "Waterwörld" TV6
- 2009: "Cirkus Möller" TV4
- 2009: "Bläsningen" w TV3

== Music video ==
- 2012: The Super Orchestra, "Jealous"
- 2010: Ola Svensson, "Riot"
- 2009: Le Kid, "Hjärta"

=== Music Producer ===
Skysoundtrack (music producer Slawomir Rynkiewicz) in 2011 with "Danddys with money" came to the final in the Swedish music poll METRO ON STAGE
