= Sławomir Tryc =

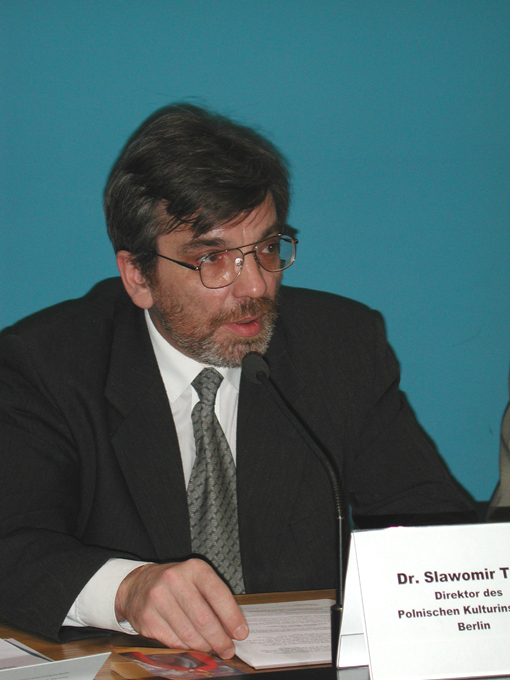
Head of Polish Cultural Institute in Berlin in 1998

Sławomir Tryc (born 19 November 1952 in Zgorzelec) is a Dr. phil., scientist, literary translator, diplomat, cultural manager, and sailor. Following his A-levels in 1971 at the Gebrüder-Śniadecki Grammar School in Zgorzelec, he graduated from the Institute for German Studies at the University of Wrocław; in 1976 Tryc then graduated with the MA thesis "Thomas Mann in Poland".

== Academic and research activities ==
Dissertation 1984 (University of Wrocław) "Friedrich Dürrenmatt on the Polish stage". Tryc worked as lecturer for many years at the Institute of German Studies at the University of Wrocław ( field: history of German culture and society) and in the European Diplomacy programme at the University of Wrocław ( field: foreign cultural policy, nation branding, media in diplomacy). He was a Scholarship holder of the Friedrich Ebert Foundation (Bonn, Frankfurt am Main, Munich), the DAAD (Bonn) and the OeAD (Vienna).

From 2013 to 2019 Tryc worked as a replacement professor at the Faculty of Managerial and Cultural Studies at the Zittau/Görlitz University of Applied Sciences. From 2017, he was a member of the board of trustees of the Stadthalle Foundation in Görlitz, from which he resigned in 2021 in protest against the appointment of the AfD parliamentary group leader to the board of trustees by the city administration.

From 2010 to 2016, Tryc was an academic supervisor of the Municipal Museum of the City of Jelenia Góra "Gerhard Hauptmann Haus", including co-editor, translator and moderator of cultural events.

== Polish Cultural Institute in Berlin ==
Tryc is a long-time employee of the Polish Ministry of Foreign Affairs: between 1997 and 2001 as head of the largest and Polish Institute in Berlin. In 1998–2001, the institute he directed became one of the co-organisers and later the main organiser of the cyclical presentation of Polish culture abroad, "Polish Week in Berlin and Brandenburg".

== Embassy of the Republic of Poland in Berlin ==
From 2004 to 2009, Tryc was Embassy Counselor, later First Embassy Counselor, Head of the Department for Culture, Science and Promotion at the Embassy of the Republic of Poland in Berlin, responsible for, among other things, politics of history. Slawomir Tryc represented Poland in a number of German cultural institutions: 2005-2009 he was a member of the jury of the Silesian Cultural Award of the State of Lower Saxony, 2006-2009 a member of the Board of Trustees of the Pomeranian State Museum in Greifswald, 2009-2015 a member of the Board of Trustees of the Silesian Museum in Görlitz, 2009 a member of the scientific advisory board of the exhibition "Deutsche und Polen - 1.9.39 - Abgründe und Hoffnungen" (Germans and Poles - 1.9.39 - Abysses and Hopes) at the German Historical Museum in Berlin, organised on the occasion of the 70th anniversary of the outbreak of World War II.

== Published in German (a selection) ==
- 2015 Sławomir Tryc / Zaprucka J.I., Muzeum Miejskie „Dom Gerharta Hauptmanna“ / Städtisches Museum Gerhart-Hauptmann-Haus / The Municipal Museum “Gerhart Hauptmann´s House“, Jelenia Góra
- 2014 Mein Schlesien. Zum Paradigmenwechsel in der Wahrnehmung des deutschen Kulturerbes. (My Silesia. On the Paradigm Shift in the Perception of German Cultural Heritage). In: Paul Zalewski, Joanna Drejer (Ed.): Kulturerbe und Aneignungsprozesse in deutsch-polnischen Kontakträumen. Motivationen, Realitäten, Träume (Das gemeinsame Kulturerbe – Wspólne dziedzictwo, (Cultural Heritage and Appropriation Processes in German-Polish Contact Spaces. Motivations, Realities, Dreams (The Common Cultural Heritage), vol. 9, at the same time series of publications of the Chair of Monument Studies of the European University Viadrina, vol. 2). Warszawa, pp. 53-69, ISBN 978-83-63877-52-1
- 2011 Preussen aus polnischer Sicht. „Erzfeind oder Teil eigener Vergangenheit? (Prussia from a Polish Perspective. "Arch-enemy or part of its own past?) In: Menzel, Steffen (ed.), Nachdenken über Preußen. Conference Proceedings. Schloss Krobnitz, pp. 16-23.
- 2013 Sławomir Tryc / Zaprucka J.I. (Hrsg.), Gerhart Hauptmann i śląscy nobliści / Gerhart Hauptmann und schlesische Nobelpreisträger / Gerhart Hauptmann and Silesian Nobel Prize winners, translation. Tomasz Cel, Sławomir Tryc, Agnieszka Krajewska; The Municipal Museum Gerhart-Hauptmann-Haus, Jelenia Góra; ISBN 978-83-922463-7-4
- 2001 Mechthild, Ernst, Maria Louise Kaempffe - Scherenschnitte: Mit einem vollständigen Verzeichnis der im Museum Europäischer Kulturen - Staatliche Museen zu Berlin erhaltenen Scherenschnitte der schlesischen Künstlerin (Silhouettes: With a complete index of the Silesian artist's silhouettes preserved in the Museum of European Cultures - National Museums in Berlin). Preface: Slawomir Tryc and Konrad Vanja, Berlin, ISBN 978-3-931656-39-3
- 1998 Enzo Marino: Mythos Eros Magie / Mito Eros Magia (Myth Eros Magic Works Ricera) 1988 - 1998 (Paolo Faiola, Slawomir Tryc; Preface: Francesco Piselli; Introduction:. Francesco D'Episcopo, Giuseppe Siano; Texts), Edizione Intra Moenia
- 1998 Friedrich Dürrenmatt auf den polnischen Bühnen. Mit allgemeinen Bemerkungen zur Rezeption fremdsprachiger Theaterwerke in Polen 1945-1989 (Friedrich Dürrenmatt on the Polish stage. With general remarks on the reception of foreign language theatre productions in Poland 1945-1989), in: Polnisch-deutsche Theaterbeziehungen seit dem Zweiten Weltkrieg (Polish-German Theatre Relations since the Second World War), ed. by Hans-Peter Bayerdörfer in Verbindung in conjunction with Małgorzata Leyko and Małgorzata Sugiera. ISBN 9783484660267
- 1994 Norbert Honsza/Sławomir Tryc (Ed.), Studien zur DDR-Literatur (Studies on GDR literature), Wrocław: Wydawnictwo Uniwersytetu Wrocławskiego, 133 S.- (Acta Universitatis Wratislaviensis; No 1561, Germanica Wratislaviensia; [T.] 104), ISBN 9788322910344
- 1986 Brauneck Manfred, Gerhard Schneilin (Hrsg.), Theater Lexikon. Begriffe und Epochen / Bühnen und Ensembles, Rowohlt (Theatre Lexikon. Terms and Epochs / Stages and Ensembles), Reinbek bei Hamburg (Encyclopedia entries on Polish theatre: Centrum Sztuki Studio S. 196, Cricot, Cricot 2, S. 235, Reduta, S. 715, Studententheater in Polen, S. 818–820, Teatr Dramatyczny Warszawa, S. 864, Teatr im. J.Slowackiego Kraków, S. 864–865, Teatr Narodowy, S. 865–866, Teatr Nowy, S. 866, Teatr Polski, S. 875–876, Teatr Rapsodyczny, S. 876, Teatr Stary, S. 876–877, Teatr Współczesny, S. 877). ISBN 978-3499554650

=== Literary translations ===
- 2014 Hauptmann, Harriet / Rohlfs, Stefan (Hrsg.), In höchster Berliner Eile .... Gerhart Hauptmann – Ivo Hauptmann. Briefwechsel, vbb 2012, ISBN 978-3-942476-32-4 // - Harriet Hauptmann, Stefan Rohlfs (Ed.) W iście berlińskim tempie... Gerhart Hauptmann / Ivo Hauptmann. Listy, Przekład: Sławomir Tryc, ISBN 978-83-922463-8-1, ISBN 978-83-7977-057-1, Jelenia Góra – Wrocław, 288 S.

=== Interviews ===
- 2001 Der Tagesspiegel, 21. April, Andrea Exler, Kennzeichen CD - Die Welt in Berlin (Teil 5): Polen: Der Mann fürs bessere Image.
- 2001 FAZ, 25. August, Stefanie Peter, Bürokratie tötet den Geist. Nun muß das hiesige Polnische Kulturinstitut ohne Slawomir Tryc auskommen
- 2001 Zeitschrift für Kulturaustausch 3/2001, Berliner Institut mit polnischem Touch
- 2000 Die Welt, 23. November, Nina Klein, Die unbekannten Nachbarn
- 1998 FAZ, 14. Oktober, Gerard Gnauck, Von der Folklore zur „neuen Sensibilität“. Polen entdeckt die auswärtige Kulturpolitik.

== See also ==
- 2012 Gaëlle Lisack (Diss.), Nationale oder interkulturelle Institutionen? Analyse der Programmarbeit osteuropäischer Kulturinstitute in Berlin und Paris zu Beginn des 21. Jahrhunderts. Institutions nationales ou interculturelles ? Analyse de la programmation d’instituts culturels d’Europe centrale à Berlin et Paris à l’aube du vingt-et-unième siècle. Fachbereich Politik- und Sozialwissenschaften der Freien Universität Berlin, École Doctorale IV : Civilisations, Cultures, Litteratures et Sociétés Université Paris-IV-Paris Sorbonne Discipline / Spécialité : Etudes Germaniques, Berlin, Paris 2012,
