= Slavoj =

Slavoj may refer to:

- Karel Slavoj Amerling (1807–1884), Czech teacher, writer, and philosopher
- Slavoj Černý (1937–2020), Czech cyclist
- Slavoj Žižek (born 1949), Slovenian philosopher

== See also ==
- Záboj and Slavoj, outdoor sculpture by Josef Václav Myslbek, installed at Vyšehradské sady in Vyšehrad, Prague, Czech Republic
- Slavoljub
