= Ratajczak =

Ratajczak is a Polish surname. It is a patronymic surname of Northern Polish origin formed by the addition of the diminutive suffix -czak to the patronymic nickname or surname Rataj lit. 'farmer'. It may refer to:

- Alicja Ratajczak (born 1995), Polish cyclist
- Dariusz Ratajczak (1962–2010), Polish historian
- Donald Ratajczak (born 1942), American economist
- Elżbieta Ratajczak (born 1946), Polish politician
- Jacek Ratajczak (born 1973), Polish footballer
- Michael Ratajczak (born 1982), German footballer
- Kevin Ratajczak (born 1985), German singer

== See also ==
- Ratajczyk
