= Sławomir Twardygrosz =

Polish footballer

Personal information
- Date of birth: 18 April 1967 (age 59)
- Place of birth: Gorzów Wielkopolski, Poland
- Height: 1.74 m (5 ft 9 in)
- Position: Midfielder

Senior career*
Years	Team	Apps	(Gls)
1985–1989	Stilon Gorzów Wielkopolski		
1989–1994	Śląsk Wrocław	149	(9)
1994–1995	Lech Poznań	33	(3)
1996	Zawisza Bydgoszcz		
1996	Varta Namysłów	12	
1997–1998	Tarnovia Tarnowo Podgórne		
1998–1999	Kotwica Kórnik		
2000	RKS Radomsko		
2000–2001	Lech Poznań	10	(0)
2001	→ Arka Gdynia (loan)		
2002	Pogoń Świebodzin		
2002	Zryw Dąbie		
2003	Poznań 2000		
2003	Obra Zbąszyń		
2006	Victoria Września		
2007–2008	TS 1998 Dopiewo		
2008–2011	Lech Poznań (oldboys)		
2011–2012	Kolejorz Poznań		
2012	Lech Poznań (oldboys)		
2014	Lech Poznań (oldboys)		
- * Club domestic league appearances and goals

Sławomir Twardygrosz (born 18 April 1967 in Gorzów Wielkopolski) is a Polish former professional footballer who played as a midfielder.

== Club career ==
Twardygrosz began his professional career with Stilon Gorzów Wielkopolski, before moving to Śląsk Wrocław where he appeared in 121 Ekstraklasa games and 28 I liga fixtures across five seasons.

Twardygrosz moved to Lech Poznań for the 1994–95 season, where he made 33 league appearances. He spent a few seasons in the lower leagues before returning to Lech where he appeared in another 10 second division games.

== Honours ==
Lech Poznań

- I liga: 2001–02
