= Slavoljub Filipović =

Serbian politician (born 1951)

Slavoljub "Boban" Filipović
- Славољуб "Бобан" Филиповић
- Born: 1951; Jagodina, Serbia, Yugoslavia
- Died: March 20, 2025 (aged 73–74); Serbia
- Occupations: Politician, Gallerist
- Known for: Member of the National Assembly of Serbia (1993–1997)
- Political party: Serbian Renewal Movement

Slavoljub "Boban" Filipović (Serbian Cyrillic: Славољуб "Бобан" Филиповић; 1951 – 20 March 2025) was a politician in Serbia. He served in the National Assembly of Serbia from 1993 to 1997 as a member of the Serbian Renewal Movement (Srpski pokret obnove, SPO).

== Private career ==
In the 1993 Serbian election, Filipović identified as a gallerist based in Jagodina.

He was the owner of the Café & Gallery "Gabo", a well-known cultural spot in the city.

== Politician ==
Filipović was a founding member of the Serbian Renewal Movement in 1990. The party contested the 1992 Serbian parliamentary election as part of the Democratic Movement of Serbia (Demokratski pokret Srbije, DEPOS) coalition, and Filipović appeared in the sixth position on the coalition's electoral list in the Smederevo division. The list won five seats, and he was included in his party's delegation when the assembly convened in early 1993. (From 1992 to 2000, Serbia's electoral law stipulated that one-third of parliamentary mandates would be assigned to candidates on successful lists in numerical order, while the remaining two-thirds would be distributed amongst other candidates at the discretion of the sponsoring parties or coalitions. Filipović's relatively low position did not prevent him from receiving a mandate.) The Socialist Party of Serbia (Socijalistička partija Srbije, SPS) won the election, and the SPO served in opposition.

Filipović was promoted to the third position on the DEPOS list for Smederevo in the 1993 Serbian parliamentary election; the list again won five mandates, and he was given a mandate for a second term. The Socialists again won the election, and the SPO continued to serve in opposition. In 1994, Filipović complained about police inaction (or complicity) in the face of fuel and cigarette smuggling by organized crime networks. He was not a candidate in the 1997 Serbian election.

In October 1997, Filipović was expelled from the SPO under extremely acrimonious circumstances. In leaving the party's assembly, he accused his former colleagues of being "communists." His rivals, in turn, taunted him as having been a spy for the Democratic Party (Demokratska stranka, DS).

He later became reconciled to the SPO at least on a local level after the fall of Slobodan Milošević's administration and was the party's candidate for mayor of Jagodina in the 2004 Serbian local elections. He was defeated in the first round of voting.

== Electoral record ==
=== Municipal (Jagodina) ===
2004 Municipality of Jagodina local election: Mayor of Jagodina
Candidate	Party	First round		Second round	
Candidate	Party	Votes	%	Votes	%
Dragan Marković Palma	United Serbia			18,756	67.01
Snežana Mitrović	Democratic Party			9,234	32.99
Slavoljub Filipović	Serbian Renewal Movement				
other candidates					
Total				27,990	100.00
