= Jurczyk =

Jurczyk is a Polish surname. Notable people with the surname include:

- Magdalena Jurczyk (born 1995), Polish volleyball player
- Marc Jurczyk (born 1996), German male track cyclist
- Marian Jurczyk (1935–2014), Polish politician and Solidarity trade union activist
- Marius Jurczyk (born 1985), German-Polish footballer
- Steve Jurczyk, Associate Administrator of NASA
