= Janczyk =

Janczyk is a Polish surname. Notable people with the surname include:

- Dawid Janczyk (born 1987), Polish footballer
- Wiesław Jańczyk (born 1931), Polish footballer
- Roman Jańczyk (1903–1980), Polish footballer
- Neil Janczyk (born 1983), Scottish footballer
