= Liu Xiang =

Liu Xiang or Liuxiang may refer to:

== People ==
- Liu Xiang, Prince of Qi (齊王劉襄; died 179 BC), prince during the Han dynasty
- Liu Xiang, Prince of Liang (梁王劉襄; died 97 BC), prince during the Han dynasty
- Liu Xiang (scholar) (劉向; 77 BC – 6 BC), Han dynasty scholar-official, historian, poet and bibliographer
- Liu Xiang (warlord) (劉湘; 1888–1938), Chinese warlord of the Sichuan clique

=== Sportspeople ===
- Liu Xiang (footballer) (刘翔; born 1982), Chinese footballer
- Liu Xiang (hurdler) (刘翔; born 1983), Chinese Olympic hurdler
- Liu Xiang (swimmer) (刘湘; born 1996), Chinese swimmer

== Places in China ==
- Liuxiang, Anhui (柳巷), town in Mingguang, Anhui
- Liuxiang Township, Gansu (六巷乡), township in Xihe County, Gansu
- Liuxiang Township, Guangxi (六巷乡), township in Jinxiu Yao Autonomous County, Guangxi
- Liuxiang Subdistrict (柳巷街道), subdistrict in Yingze District, Taiyuan, Shanxi

== See also ==
- Xiangliu (相栁), a poisonous nine-headed snake monster that brings flooding and destruction in Chinese mythology
