= Sławomir Jarczyk =

Polish footballer

Personal information
- Date of birth: 18 August 1980 (age 46)
- Place of birth: Chorzów, Poland
- Height: 1.91 m (6 ft 3 in)
- Position: Defender

Team information
- Current team: Ruch Chorzów (assistant)

Senior career*
Years	Team	Apps	(Gls)
2001–2004	Ruch Chorzów	58	(1)
2005	Polonia Warsaw	22	(0)
2006	Podbeskidzie Bielsko-Biała	17	(0)
2006–2007	Górnik Zabrze	37	(0)
2008–2010	Wisła Płock	68	(3)
2010–2011	Pogoń Barlinek	10	(0)
2011–2015	Zagłębie Sosnowiec	105	(1)
2015	Unia Dąbrowa Górnicza		
2018	Orzeł Nakło Śląskie	4	(0)
- * Club domestic league appearances and goals

Sławomir Jarczyk (born 18 August 1980) is a Polish former professional footballer who played as a defender. He currently serves as an assistant coach of I liga club Ruch Chorzów.
