= Sławomir Ratajski =

Polish painter and diplomat

Slawomir Ratajski
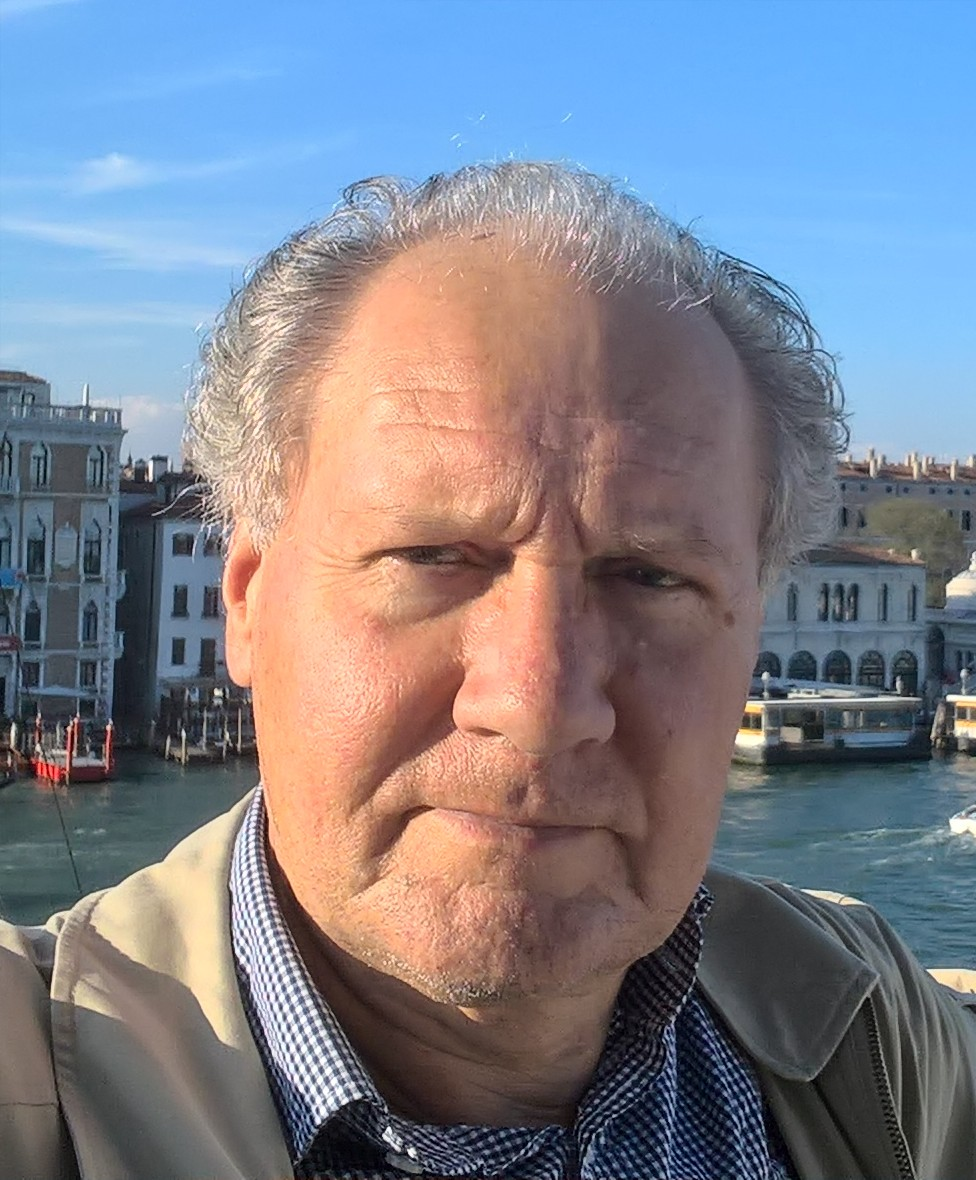
- Ratajski in 2019
- Born: 1955 (age 70–71); Warsaw, Poland
- Education: Academy of Fine Arts in Warsaw
- Known for: Painting
- Spouse: Zofia Jabłonowska-Ratajska

Sławomir Ratajski (born 1955 in Warsaw) is a Polish painter and diplomat.

He is an artist, diplomat, professor, lecturer at Warsaw’s Academy of Fine Arts (ASP), son of eminent cartographer Lech Ratajski.

Completed his studies at the Graphic Arts Department of Warsaw’s Academy of Fine Arts (ASP) under professors Halina Chrzostowska and Jerzy Tchórzewski.

Taught at the ASP from 1987, initially ran a painting and drawing studio within the Graphic Arts Department. Presently head of the General Visual and Applied Arts Chair of the Media Art Department. Obtained a doctorate and qualified as assistant professor in 1996. On April 1, 2011 nominated professor of Fines Arts by Polish president Bronisław Komorowski.

== Style ==
On completion of his studies produced a dynamic and symbolic painting style in the New Expression style, simultaneously a member of the independent artistic movement of the martial law period – all at once avoiding summarily journalistic. Gradually, with time, limited the symbolic narrative of his paintings in favour of more abstract forms, whilst not abandoning the expressionist textured effect.

Organised international artistic symposia during 1990-1994 attracting artists from Poland, Spain, Greece and Germany. Executive Committee member of the Independent Solidarity Trade Union branch at the Academy of Fine Arts in Warsaw, and its chairman from 1990.

== Politician and diplomat ==
Nominated Secretary of State at the Ministry of Culture and the Arts in Prime Minister Jerzy Buzek’s government. Responsible for international relations, among others organised Polish culture promotional events at the Frankfurt International Book Fair in 2000, as well as Expo 2000 in Hanover. Was also involved in creating the Juliusz Słowacki Museum in Krzemieniec. Co-author of “Polish Government Arts Policy 1999-2001”. Ambassador of the Polish Republic to Argentina and Paraguay during 2001-2005, and Cuba in absentia in 2006. During that time responsible for numerous initiatives throughout Latin America promoting Poland through its culture, including exhibitions, concerts, Chopin Festivals and the Gombrowicz Year Programme. On returning to Poland Continues his artistic work and association with the Warsaw based Academy of Fine Arts. Secretary General for the Polish National Commission for UNESCO from 2007.

2014 he received the Knight's Cross of the Order of Polonia Restituta.

== Personal life ==
Married to Zofia Jabłonowska-Ratajska, a historian and art critic. They have three children.

== Selected exhibitions ==
Organised presentations of his paintings and other works at twenty two individual exhibitions in Poland, Germany and Spain, as well as at several dozen shows of Polish Art at exhibitions including:

- 1982 – 33 Salon Jeune Expression, Grand Palais, Paris;
- 1985 – Młoda Expresja Polska, Academy of Arts, Budapest;
- 1985 – Polish Pieta, Archdiocesan Museum in Poznań, Dominican Church, Cracow;
- 1986 – I International Asia-Europe Art Biennale, Ankara;
- 1987 – Młoda Sztuka Polska, Polish Institute, Budapest;
- 1987 – Współczesna Sztuka Polska, Maneż, Moscow;
- 1987 – International Arts Fair, Istanbul;
- 1987 – Modern Polish Drawing, Polish Institute, Paris;
- 1987 – Polska sztuka Młodych, Lviv, Moscow;
- 1987 – International Painting Festival, Cagnes-sur-Mer;
- 1988 – Świeżo malowane, National Gallery Zachęta, Warsaw;
- 1990 – Cóż po artyście w czasie marnym?, National Gallery Zachęta, Warsaw, National Museum in Cracow,
- 1990 – Współczesna sztuka z Polski, Vienna;
- 1991 – Współczesna sztuka z Polski, Leipzig Opera;
- 2002 – Graphic Art and Polish Posters, Recoleta Cultural Centre, Buenos Aires;
- 2003 – Visionaries and Rebels, National Gallery Zachęta, Warsaw;
- 2010 – The 1980s. Transformation, Gaga Gallery, Warsaw;
- 2010 – Apogee – New Expression 1987, “Sign of Our Times” Modern Art Centre, Toruń;
- 2014 – Ars principia, UMK Toruń, BWA Kielce, A Way to Freedom – Płocka Galeria Sztuki, Płock, Galeria Sztuki Współczesnej, Włocławek,
- 2019 – 9x10, Salon Akademii Gallery, Warsaw.

== Catalogue raisonné ==
- “Time of Sadness, Time of Hope”, Aleksander Wojciechowski, p. 71, 112, 167, 176, 177 publ.: WAiF, 1992;
- “Communication and Culture, publ.: Libreria Vaticana, S. Ratajski, «Verso la bellezza della vita…», 1999;
- “Dictionary of Polish Painters”, vol. 2, p. 289-290, text Maryla Sitkowska, 2001;
- “Time For Geologists. On the Margins of Sławomir Ratajski’s Creativity”, J.S. Wojciechowski, publ.: Przegląd Powszechny, issue 3/811, 1989;
- Exhibition Catalogue from “Polish Art and Culture in Argentina”, conception and text S. Ratajski, publ.: National Museum of Decorative Arts, Buenos Aires, 2005;
- Culture and Balanced Development. The Environment, Spatial Planning, Heritage”, foreword by S. Ratajski, publ.: The Polish Committee for UNESCO, 2009.
- “Education Through Culture. Creativity and Innovativeness”, ed.: D. Ilczuk, S. Ratajski, publ.: Polish Committee for UNESCO, 2011.
