= Bošnjane (Rača) =

- Village
- Location within Serbia
- Coordinates: 44°15′49″N 20°56′54″E
- Country: Serbia
- District: Šumadija District
- Municipality: Rača

Population (2002)
  - Total: 559
- Time zone: UTC+1 (CET)
  - Summer (DST): UTC+2 (CEST)

Bošnjane (Serbian: Бошњане) is a village in the municipality of Rača, Serbia. According to the 2002 census, the village has a population of 559 people.
