= List of common surnames in Croatia =

This is a list of the most common surnames in Croatia. As of 2021, there were 33,214 surnames in Croatia with 10 or more resident bearers. More than 10 thousand of them have been covered in dedicated print encyclopedia entries, and the rest in online encyclopedia entries.

Surname	Haplogroups	Population in Croatia		Ethnicity	Mentioned	Meaning	
Surname	Haplogroups	2011	2021	Ethnicity	Mentioned	Language	Etymology
Horvat		21618	19705	Croat, Hungarian, Roma	1669		
Kovačević	I2a1a2b1a1a1-S17250	15160	13352	Croat, Serb, Bosniak	1689		
Kovačević	I2a1a2b1a1-CTS10228	15160	13352	Croat, Serb, Bosniak	1689		
Kovačević	I1a1a1a1a1~BY170823	15160	13352	Croat, Serb, Bosniak	1689		
Babić		12840	11319	Croat, Serb	1642		
Marić	R1a1a1b1a2b-L1280	11555	10174	Croat, Serb, Bosniak	1689		
Marić	I2a1a2b1a1a1c-PH908	11555	10174	Croat, Serb, Bosniak	1689		
Jurić		11163	9852	Croat	1691		
Novak		10794	9739	Croat	1669		
Kovačić		10546	9469	Croat, Serb	1669		
Knežević	I1a1b1a1e2d3a1~FGC22054	10334	9319	Croat, Serb, Montenegrin	1725		
Vuković		10191	9163	Croat, Serb, Montenegrin	1683		
Marković	I1a1b1a1e2d3~FT36856	9854	8610	Croat, Serb	1672		
Matić	I1a2a1a2~S2606	9614	8668	Croat, Serb, Bosniak	1710		
Petrović	E1b1b1a1b1a17~Y172393	9614	8400	Croat, Serb, Roma	1683		
Tomić	I2a1a2b1a1a1c-FT308568	9464	8395	Croat, Serb	1516		
Pavlović	I2a1a2b1a1a1c-S10860	8601	7683	Croat, Serb	1749		
Pavlović	I2a1b1-M223	8601	7683	Croat, Serb	1749		
Pavlović	J2a2~PF5032	8601	7683	Croat, Serb	1749		
Pavlović	E1b1b1a1b1a6a1~FT380205	8601	7683	Croat, Serb	1749		
Kovač		8542	7476	Croat, Serb	1669		
Božić		8115	7244	Croat, Serb	1749		
Grgić		7876	6931	Croat	1691		
Blažević		7764	6854	Croat	1691		
Perić		7437	6768	Croat, Serb	1716		
Pavić		7304	6680	Croat, Serb	1750		
Radić	R1a1a1b1a1a1c1-L1029	7264	6624	Croat, Serb	1735		
Šarić		7046	6475	Croat	1669		
Lovrić		7045	6335	Croat, Serb	1750		
Filipović		6963	6129	Croat, Serb	1716		
Vidović	I2a1a2b1a1a1c-FT14649	6838	6206	Croat, Serb	1749		
Jukić		6786	6335	Croat	1749		
Bošnjak		6731	6079	Croat, Serb	1749		
Perković		6683	6024	Croat			
Popović	G2a2b2a1a1b1a1a1a1b1b-Y128480	6478	5563	Croat, Serb, Montenegrin	1749		
Nikolić	I2a1b1-M223	6353	5845	Croat, Serb, Roma	1689		
Šimić		6295	5506	Croat, Serb	1689		
Barišić		6269	5623	Croat, Serb	1678		
Bašić		6147	5676	Croat, Bosniak, Serb	1691		
Mandić	J2b1a~Y22063	5889	5237	Croat, Serb	1749		
Klarić		5754	5270	Croat	1729		
Živković	I2a1a2b1a1a1c-PH908	5722	4990	Croat, Serb	1749		
Lončar		5673	5037	Croat, Serb	1669		
Martinović		5558	4911	Croat, Serb	1749		
Barić		5511	4856	Croat	1705		
Brkić		5497	5014	Croat, Serb, Bosniak			
Galić		5426	4880	Croat, Serb	1750		
Jurković		5317	4849	Croat	1749		
Bilić		5258	4803	Croat	1716		
Kos		4991	4444	Croat, Serb	1683		
Stanić		4910	4410	Croat, Serb	1669		
Lukić		4883	4280	Croat, Serb	1516		
Matijević		4664	4163	Croat, Serb	1691		
Matković		4653	4162	Croat	1729		
Kralj		4612	4263	Croat	1669		
Janković	E1b1b1a1b1a10a1a1~A7136	4394	3866	Croat	1749		
Novosel		4340	3886	Croat	1669		
Jelić		4191	3674	Croat, Serb	1689		
Ćosić		4158	3897	Croat, Serb, Bosniak			
Miletić	I2a1a2b1a1a1c-Y134578	4144	3710	Croat, Serb	1691		
Jurišić		4136	3708	Croat, Serb	1750		
Ivanović		4067	3549	Croat, Serb, Montenegrin	1571		
Katić		4021	3557	Croat, Serb	1749		
Lučić		3971	3483	Croat, Serb	1729		
Mihaljević		3970	3841	Croat, Serb	1725		
Ilić	I2a1a2b1a1a1c-PH908	3907	3392	Croat, Serb	1749		
Ilić	R1b1a1b2a1aBY133177	3907	3392	Croat, Serb	1749		
Tadić		3906	3516	Croat, Serb	1689		
Posavec		3792	3417	Croat			
Jerković	I2a1a2b1a1a1c-BY77359	3772	3454	Croat, Serb	1691		
Marinović		3771	3466	Croat, Serb	1749		
Ivanković		3746	3336	Croat, Serb	1689		
Mikulić		3707	3443	Croat	1693		
Šimunović		3697	3295	Croat	1691		
Ivančić		3695	3267	Croat	1614		
Poljak		3649	3365	Croat, Serb	1750		
Jovanović	R1a1a1b1a2b3a4a2~BY68536	3588	3003	Croat, Serb, Roma	1749		
Jovanović	J2b2a1a1a1a1b1~Z38299	3588	3003	Croat, Serb, Roma	1749		
Herceg		3543	3258	Croat	1683		
Marjanović	R1a1a1b1a2b3a3a2~Y2902	3536	3200	Croat, Serb	1691		
Milić		3523	3251	Croat, Serb	1749		
Vidaković		3513	3179	Croat, Serb	1749		
Cindrić		3508	3144	Croat			
Marušić		3499	3264	Croat, Italian, Serb	1614		
Vučković		3459	3089	Croat, Serb			
Topić		3415	3075	Croat, Serb, Bosniak			
Rukavina		3414	2993	Croat			
Jozić		3266	2999	Croat	1749		
Delić	J2b1a~Y22059	3189	2786	Croat, Bosniak, Serb	1691		
Novaković	J2b1a~Y68217	3170	2640	Croat, Serb	1705		
Varga		3155	2758	Croat, Hungarian	1669		
Pavičić		3091	2734	Croat, Serb	1691		
Bogdan		3087	3396	Croat, Roma, Serb			
Grubišić		3076	2758	Croat, Serb			
Đurić	R1a1a1b1a1a1c1c1c3~YP6047	3057	2667	Croat, Serb, Roma	1749		
Špoljarić		3030	2763	Croat			
Dujmović		3029	2682	Croat			
Vukelić		3003	2596	Croat, Serb	1736		
Kolar		2976	2591	Croat, Serb, Hungarian	1664		
Burić		2942	2616	Croat			
Štimac		2932	2613	Croat, German/Jewish	1736		
Petković		2901	2555	Croat, Serb	1689		
Kolarić		2900	2593	Croat, Serb			
Petrić		2896	2642	Croat, Serb	1571		
Brajković		2893	2695	Croat	1749		
Bačić		2892	2646	Croat, Serb	1691		
Jakšić	R1a1a1b1a2b3a4a2~FT255070	2860	2527	Croat, Serb	1683		
Jakšić	I1a1b1a1e2d3~FT36856	2860	2527	Croat, Serb	1683		
Jović		2851	2476	Croat, Serb	1725		
Ivić		2847	2554	Croat	1691		
Stanković	R1a1a1b1a2b-L1280	2842	2467	Croat, Serb, Roma	1749		
Stanković	I2a1a2b1a1a1c-PH908	2842	2467	Croat, Serb, Roma	1749		
Ružić		2838	2474	Croat, Serb	1691		
Pranjić		2821	2480	Croat	1942		
Stojanović	J2b1a~Y22063	2798	2389	Croat, Roma	1749		
Stojanović	J2b1a~J-Y22059	2798	2389	Croat, Roma	1749		
Stojanović	J2b2a1a1a1b2~Y40288	2798	2389	Croat, Roma	1749		
Stojanović	I2a1a2b1a1a1c-FT14506	2798	2389	Croat, Roma	1749		
Antunović		2794	2477	Croat	1749		
Mitrović		2785	2575	Croat, Serb, Roma	1749		
Lončarić		2781	2460	Croat	1678		
Ban		2779	2491	Croat	1640		
Tolić		2756	2498	Croat, Serb	1917		
Josipović		2747	2453	Croat, Serb	1750		
Pejić	R1a1a1b1a2b-BY149000	2747	2426	Croat, Serb	1749		
Pintarić		2726	2462	Croat			
Golubić		2725	2460	Croat	1664		
Anić		2689	2404	Croat			
Prpić		2655	2237	Croat	1691		
Tokić		2647	2387	Croat, Bosniak	1842		
Erceg		2591	2443	Croat, Serb	1691		
Petričević		2590	2452	Croat, Serb	1842		
Budimir		2585	2437	Croat, Serb	1917		
Baričević		2557	2367	Croat	1769		
Martić		2542	2233	Croat, Serb	1917		
Starčević		2535	2168	Croat, Serb	1683		
Vlašić		2531	2271	Croat	1606		
Vrdoljak		2525	2389	Croat			
Mijatović		2514	2156	Croat, Serb	1721		
Car		2492	2230	Croat, Serb			
Majić		2490	2257	Croat, Serb			
Šimunić		2484	2194	Croat	1664		
Horvatić		2480	2220	Croat	1749		
Mlinarić		2461	2209	Croat	1701		
Ljubičić		2447	2223	Croat, Serb	1749		
Pavlić		2441	2168	Croat			
Vukić		2426	2145	Croat, Serb, Bosniak	1749		
Vlahović		2415	2156	Croat, Montenegrin, Serb	1683		
Sever		2405	2180	Croat	1769		
Abramović		2397	2129	Croat, Serb	1736		
Crnković		2392	2160	Croat, Serb			
Mamić		2372	2251	Croat, Serb			
Grgurić		2365	2115	Croat	1691		
Ivković		2359	2080	Croat, Serb			
Zorić		2355	2131	Croat, Serb	1606		
Čović		2346	2159	Croat, Bosniak, Serb			
Dragičević		2340	1979	Croat, Serb	1742		
Radoš		2340	2181	Croat, Serb			
Rašić	I2a1a2b1a1a1c-BY169115	2340	2128	Croat, Serb			
Orešković		2336	2047	Croat			
Sertić		2334	2026	Croat			
Miličević		2333	2094	Croat, Serb	1750		
Ljubić	I2a1a2b1a1a1c-S10860	2328	2110	Croat			
Milković		2314	2065	Croat, Serb, Hungarian	1691		
Medved		2305	2114	Croat			
Matošević		2303	2025	Croat	1749		
Andrić		2300	2003	Croat, Serb	1750		
Milošević		2280	1910	Croat, Serb, Montenegrin	1516		
Turković		2271	2057	Croat			
Franić		2267	2130	Croat	1716		
Mišković	R1b1a1b1a1a2b-BY3654	2252	2014	Croat, Serb, Roma	1691		
Balić	E1b1b1a1b1a6a1a4~BY62310	2248	2058	Croat, Bosniak, Serb	1729		
Šoštarić		2235	2015	Croat	1669		
Mihalić		2224	2006	Croat			
Milanović		2224	1950	Croat, Serb			
Jurčević		2214	2108	Croat	1750		
Galović		2171	1903	Croat, Serb	1769		
Radošević		2156	1895	Croat, Serb	1710		
Rajković		2156	1897	Croat, Serb, Montenegrin			
Balog		2145	2234	Croat, Roma, Hungarian	1769		
Mikić		2142	1848	Croat, Serb	1749		
Medić		2135	1848	Croat, Serb, Bosniak			
Savić	R1a1a1b1a2b-BY149000	2127	1771	Serb, Croat, Montenegrin	1721		
Savić	J2a1a2b~Y14439	2127	1771	Serb, Croat, Montenegrin	1721		
Savić	E1b1b1a1b1a17~Y172393	2127	1771	Serb, Croat, Montenegrin	1721		
Lacković		2121	1923	Croat, Serb	1701		
Puškarić		2113	1967	Croat			
Buljan		2107	1922	Croat			
Kolić		2101	1951	Croat, Bosniak			
Majstorović		2097	1854	Croat, Serb, Bosniak	1750		
Mijić		2091	1776	Croat, Serb			
Sučić		2085	1935	Croat	1571		
Tomašić		2084	1839	Croat	1729		
Meštrović		2055	1881	Croat	1606		
Ćurić		2043	2001	Croat	1750		
Marijanović		2043	1691	Croat, Serb	1691		
Cvitković		2042	1777	Croat			
Vukušić		2040	1885	Croat			
Nekić		2033	1861	Croat			
Hodak		2031	1820	Croat			
Đurđević		2028	1763	Croat, Serb, Roma	1683		
Glavaš		2025	1822	Croat, Serb, Bosniak	1935		
Begić		2024	1799	Croat, Bosniak, Serb			
Maričić		2019	1746	Croat, Serb	1749		
Rožić		2016	1806	Croat			
Kraljević		2005	1920	Croat, Serb, Italian	1750		
Devčić		2002	1801	Croat	1691		
Vuletić		1996	1836	Croat			
Ostojić		1990	1724	Croat, Serb, Montenegrin	1749		
Vuk		1986	1828	Croat	1749		
Matanović		1983	1742	Croat	1750		
Jakovljević	I2a1a2b1a1a1c-FT275645	1980	1719	Croat, Serb, Montenegrin			
Dukić	I2a1a2b1a1a1c-FT378696	1947	1694	Croat, Serb	1750		
Begović		1939	1749	Croat, Bosniak, Serb			
Salopek		1914	1711	Croat			
Duvnjak	R1a1a1b1a2b-BY30743	1913	1749	Croat			
Golub		1911	1715	Croat			
Turkalj		1911	1701	Croat			
Jurjević		1908	1836	Croat, Serb	1750		
Bulić		1907	1788	Croat, Serb, Bosniak	1689		
Lalić		1906	1672	Croat, Serb	1691		
Rončević		1899	1778	Croat, Serb			
Banović		1898	1700	Croat, Serb, Montenegrin			
Zelić		1889	1736	Croat, Serb	1749		
Mišić		1887	1636	Croat, Serb	1729		
Modrić		1876	1681	Croat	1691		
Stipić		1872	1690	Croat, Serb	1678		
Damjanović		1869	1649	Croat, Serb, Montenegrin	1749		
Kordić		1868	1671	Croat, Serb, Bosniak			
Valentić		1866	1745	Croat, Serb	1673		
Vinković		1860	1680	Croat	1683		
Benić		1859	1672	Croat			
Magdić		1855	1689	Croat			
Tomašević		1855	1597	Croat, Serb, Montenegrin	1691		
Marinković	E1b1b1a1b1a10a-L241	1847	1612	Croat, Serb	1642		
Bogdanović		1841	1600	Croat, Serb	1750		
Kljajić		1840	1530	Croat, Serb, Bosniak			
Rogić		1833	1649	Croat, Serb	1749		
Gudelj		1830	1706	Croat	1742		
Marinić		1827	1677	Croat	1642		
Maras		1826	1679	Croat			
Lazić		1818	1483	Serb, Croat			
Radović	J2a1a1a2b2a1a1a-FT384930	1809	1594	Croat, Serb, Montenegrin			
Radović	J2b1a~Y155375	1809	1594	Croat, Serb, Montenegrin			
Tomljanović		1807	1633	Croat	1736		
Zec		1804	1599	Croat, Serb			
Butković		1800	1590	Croat			
Đukić	I1a1b1a1e2d3a1~FGC22054	1788	1466	Croat, Serb, Montenegrin			
Knezović		1783	1656	Croat	1742		
Oršoš		1781	2047	Roma, Croat, Romanian			
Miloš		1771	1575	Croat	1749		
Obradović	R1a1a1b1a1a1c1-L1029	1768	1547	Croat, Serb, Montenegrin	1749		
Mršić		1767	1667	Croat, Serb	1673		
Turk		1765	1529	Croat, Slovene			
Bajić		1763	1501	Croat, Serb, Bosniak	1917		
Benčić		1750	1545	Croat	1642		
Ivanišević		1740	1600	Croat, Serb, Roma			
Brčić		1739	1606	Croat	1669		
Banić		1738	1574	Croat, Serb			
Radman		1728	1582	Croat		German	
Baković		1719	1622	Croat			
Pavelić		1717	1567	Croat			
Bogović		1704	1518	Croat, Serb			
Pavković		1699	1517	Croat, Serb			
Samardžić		1699	1576	Croat, Serb, Bosniak	1750		
Špehar		1687	1513	Croat			
Vulić		1684	1505	Croat, Serb	1705		
Antolović		1683	1504	Croat	1749	Italian	
Juričić		1682	1558	Croat	1750		
Barać	I1a1b1a1e2d3a1~Y50461	1680	1644	Croat, Serb	1786		
Bošković		1679	1512	Croat, Serb, Montenegrin	1729		
Lucić		1667	1513	Croat	1729		
Papić		1658	1479	Croat, Serb			
Stjepanović		1658	1451	Croat, Serb	1749		
Palić		1656	1683	Croat, Serb, Bosniak			
Franjić		1653	1486	Croat			
Kiš		1641	1409	Croat, Hungarian			
Antić		1620	1473	Croat, Serb	1678		
Žagar		1619	1413	Croat			
Bešlić		1617	1484	Croat	1750		
Špoljar		1617	1438	Croat			
Đaković		1609	1373	Croat, Serb	1749		
Mesić		1608	1410	Croat			
Raguž		1608	1577	Croat	1942		
Soldo		1607	1526	Croat	1928		
Benković		1601	1393	Croat	1672		
Vranić		1599	1443	Croat, Serb, Bosniak	1750		
Kraljić		1596	1412	Croat			
Krizmanić		1591	1435	Croat			
Sekulić		1588	1328	Croat, Serb	1749		
Borić		1577	1404	Croat, Serb, Bosniak	1749		
Župan		1574	1406	Croat		Serbo-Croatian	
Krznarić		1572	1402	Croat		Serbo-Croatian	
Jelavić		1569	1389	Croat	1929	Serbo-Croatian	
Čuljak		1565	1442	Croat			
Gašpar		1563	1427	Croat, Hungarian			
Tomičić		1562	1392	Croat			
Mirković		1550	1328	Croat, Serb, Montenegrin	1664		
Bijelić		1545	1281	Croat, Serb	1917		
Ćurković		1539	1491	Croat			
Jurčić		1536	1369	Croat	1678		
Vučić		1532	1353	Croat, Serb	1750		
Bušić		1530	1443	Croat			
Zovko		1530	1456	Croat	1924		
Oršuš		1527	1806	Roma, Croat			
Kuzmić		1522	1365	Croat	1749		
Rajić		1521	1183	Croat, Serb	1749		
Pleša		1520	1346	Croat			
Cvetković	E1b1b1a1b1a10a1-FT61303	1514	1275	Croat, Serb	1691		
Sabljak		1510	1336	Croat			
Ćorić		1507	1406	Croat, Serb, Bosniak			
Štefanac		1507	1370	Croat			
Lulić		1500	1288	Croat			
Smolčić		1493	1327	Croat			
Krpan		1489	1276	Croat	1691		
Rendulić		1489	1353	Croat			
Simić		1488	1275	Serb, Croat, Roma	1689		
Barbarić		1486	1392	Croat	1729		
Perica		1485	1415	Croat	1842		
Vidić		1485	1319	Croat, Serb			
Tot		1483	1284	Croat, Hungarian, Rusyn	1749		
Tonković		1476	1316	Croat, Serb	1678		
Brekalo		1471	1257	Croat	1942		
Boban		1470	1344	Croat, Serb			
Lasić		1456	1376	Croat	1691		
Došen		1454	1271	Croat, Serb			
Blašković		1453	1335	Croat, Serb, Italian	1614		
Lukač		1452	1337	Croat, Serb, Hungarian	1683		
Uzelac		1450	1143	Croat, Serb			
Perišić		1445	1336	Croat, Serb			
Gašparić		1444	1292	Croat	1701		
Sabo		1443	1250	Croat, Hungarian, Slovak		Hungarian	
Rakić		1440	1212	Croat, Serb			
Kramarić		1433	1236	Croat	1691		
Terzić		1432	1222	Croat, Serb			
Radanović		1431	1244	Croat, Serb, Montenegrin	1750	Serbo-Croatian	
Kelava		1429	1315	Croat			
Zadravec		1425	1293	Croat, Slovene			
Bukvić		1420	1288	Croat, Serb, Bosniak	1917		
Klobučar		1411	1258	Croat	1736		
Kozina		1408	1334	Croat			
Biondić		1406	1213	Croat		Italian	
Tušek		1401	1267	Croat	1769		
Anđelić		1400	1316	Croat, Serb			
Lukačević		1397	1227	Croat	1749		
Vrban		1397	1265	Croat	1691		
Antolić		1396	1253	Croat	1664	Italian	
Grbić	R1a1a1b1a2b-BY149000	1389	1135	Croat, Serb, Bosniak			
Mustapić		1388	1291	Croat		Arabic	
Farkaš		1386	1190	Croat, Hungarian		Hungarian	
Orlić		1383	1228	Croat, Serb, Bosniak		Serbo-Croatian	
Čačić		1380	1195	Croat	1691		
Marasović		1379	1296	Croat	1691		
Mesarić		1379	1181	Croat	1669	Serbo-Croatian	
Žilić		1377	1319	Croat, Serb, Bosniak			
Škvorc		1368	1206	Croat			
Gašparović		1364	1164	Croat, Serb			
Matešić		1364	1252	Croat			
Šabić		1364	1277	Croat, Bosniak			
Ribić		1363	1268	Croat, Bosniak			
Pintar		1362	1188	Croat	1691		
Knez		1360	1305	Croat	1769		
Žunić		1358	1195	Croat, Serb, Bosniak			
Kosanović	J2b1a~Y22063	1356	1142	Serb, Croat			
Matijašević		1355	1246	Croat, Serb	1749		
Tkalec		1354	1182	Croat	1701		
Gregurić		1352	1156	Croat			
Ravlić		1351	1202	Croat			
Karlović		1350	1166	Croat	1571		
Čulina		1349	1224	Croat			
Šikić		1349	1206	Croat	1691		
Udovičić		1348	1227	Croat	1742		
Sinković		1337	1200	Croat, Italian	1769		
Maretić		1336	1227	Croat			
Leko		1332	1265	Croat	1930		
Vrkić		1331	1274	Croat, Serb	1842		
Rupčić		1324	1253	Croat			
Maršić		1323	1178	Croat, Serb	1516		
Tomljenović		1322	1198	Croat	1691		
Tomac		1321	1173	Croat	1736		
Nađ		1316	1154	Croat, Hungarian, Rusyn		Hungarian	
Bartolić		1312	1171	Croat, Italian	1672		
Bartulović		1312	1221	Croat			
Bralić		1312	1231	Croat	1705		
Luketić		1310	1174	Croat	1842		
Bagarić		1309	1185	Croat	1721		
Čičak		1308	1210	Croat			
Petek		1307	1242	Croat			
Čolić		1306	1111	Croat, Serb, Bosniak	1606		
Dedić		1303	1166	Croat, Bosniak, Serb			
Kocijan		1300	1183	Croat	1679		
Jakić		1296	1224	Croat, Serb	1701		
Vujić		1295	1109	Croat, Serb			
Majetić		1289	1181	Croat, Bosniak			
Brozović		1288	1125	Croat			
Dadić		1287	1144	Croat, Serb			
Butorac		1285	1132	Croat			
Polić		1285	1161	Croat, Bosniak			
Tomas		1285	1159	Croat			
Tomaš		1283	1211	Croat, Serb, Hungarian	1729		
Bekavac		1280	1144	Croat			
Vujnović	I2a1a2b1a1a3-PH3414	1280	1139	Croat, Serb	1749		
Zubčić		1280	1176	Croat	1691		
Vugrinec		1271	1119	Croat			
Aleksić	I1a3b-Z63>PH220	1270	1071	Croat, Serb, Montenegrin	1749		
Ratković		1267	1081	Croat, Serb, Montenegrin	1750	Serbo-Croatian	
Komljenović		1264	1085	Croat, Serb	1749		
Opačak		1263	1097	Croat			
Vojnović		1262	1068	Serb, Croat	1691		
Vrbanić		1261	1151	Croat	1701		
Božičević		1260	1328	Croat			
Koren		1254	1088	Croat, Slovene	1669		
Molnar		1252	1070	Croat, Hungarian			
Kranjčec		1246	1088	Croat			
Orlović		1246	1138	Croat, Serb			
Kujundžić		1244	1205	Croat, Serb			
Martinić		1244	1122	Croat	1678		
Rebić		1244	1103	Croat, Serb			
Županić		1241	1079	Croat	1678		
Vincek		1238	1125	Croat	1679		
Ignac		1236	1636	Roma, Croat			
Radočaj		1234	1076	Croat, Serb			
Glasnović		1227	1353	Croat			
Katalinić		1226	1136	Croat			
Grčić		1225	1056	Croat, Serb	1917		
Pušić		1221	1158	Croat			
Kranjec		1219	1134	Croat			
Romić		1219	1122	Croat, Serb			
Gavran		1218	1156	Croat, Serb			
Kolak		1211	1085	Croat			
Cvitanović		1208	1073	Croat			
Dujić		1206	1142	Croat, Serb	1917		
Lončarević		1205	1024	Croat, Serb	1735		
Bakić		1200	1011	Croat, Serb, Montenegrin	1691		
Kosić		1200	1065	Croat, Serb			
Marović		1199	1086	Croat, Serb, Montenegrin			
Škorić		1198	1030	Croat, Serb, Bosniak	1917		
Ćuk		1191	1059	Croat, Serb			
Nikšić		1191	1005	Croat, Serb, Bosniak	1750		
Panić		1189	992	Croat, Serb	1749		
Sabolić		1189	1068	Croat	1769		
Mihajlović		1185	939	Serb, Croat, Roma	1749		
Vukšić		1185	1067	Croat, Serb	1691		
Domazet		1184	1090	Croat, Serb, Bosniak			
Kristić		1182	1044	Croat	1750		
Grbavac		1179	1034	Croat, Serb	1673		
Matas		1177	1103	Croat			
Jeličić		1175	1082	Croat, Serb	1689		
Biškup		1174	1097	Croat	1679		
Kardum		1174	1138	Croat	1929		
Jug		1172	1037	Croat			
Barbir		1171	1024	Croat, Serb	1538		
Dodig		1171	1087	Croat, Serb	1930		
Hršak		1171	1018	Croat			
Markić		1170	1095	Croat	1606		
Puljić		1167	1060	Croat, Serb			
Lazar		1165	1038	Croat, Hungarian, Serb			
Belošević		1163	1063	Croat			
Vukoja		1163	1095	Croat	1924		
Benko		1162	1031	Croat	1683		
Šarčević		1162	1025	Croat, Serb, Bosniak			
Bošnjaković		1157	986	Croat, Bosniak, Serb	1749		
Juras		1154	1046	Croat, Serb			
Roso		1153	1061	Croat			
Vranješ		1152	1106	Croat, Serb	1917		
Topalović		1151	1066	Croat, Serb, Bosniak	1691		
Zečević		1151	999	Croat, Serb, Montenegrin	1749		
Mašić		1149	967	Croat, Bosniak, Serb	1692		
Grubić		1147	1052	Croat, Serb, Italian		Serbo-Croatian	
Malenica		1147	1109	Croat			
Todorović	I1a1b1a1e2d3~FGC22061	1147	973	Serb, Croat, Roma	1689		
Rodić		1146	1077	Croat, Serb			
Milas		1145	1097	Croat			
Lukšić		1144	1060	Croat			
Majer		1144	1003	Croat		German	
Grahovac		1137	982	Croat, Serb, Montenegrin			
Paić		1136	1014	Croat, Serb			
Mihić	I2a1a2b1a1a3-PH3414	1133	1041	Croat, Serb	1749		
Mihić	J1a2a1a1b~PF7263	1133	1041	Croat, Serb	1749		
Kurtović		1132	1053	Croat, Bosniak	1705		
Sokač		1131	1027	Croat	1917		
Šestak		1130	1005	Croat			
Fabijanić		1126	1005	Croat			
Kožul		1125	1021	Croat, Serb			
Marin		1125	1044	Croat, Serb	1642		
Prgomet		1124	1024	Croat			
Kukec		1122	1001	Croat			
Nikić	I2a1a2b1a1a1c-PH908	1122	999	Croat, Serb			
Jaković		1120	1124	Croat, Serb	1928		
Leskovar		1116	996	Croat			
Primorac		1115	1109	Croat	1923		
Krajačić		1111	969	Croat, Serb	1683		
Žužić		1109	995	Croat, Italian, Serb			
Ivančević		1108	963	Croat, Serb	1750		
Nakić		1108	1096	Croat	1705		
Katavić		1105	983	Croat			
Hanžek		1103	1011	Croat			
Levak		1101	948	Croat	1683		
Milinković		1101	960	Croat, Serb	1749		
Lešić		1100	996	Croat, Serb			
Petrušić		1100	1004	Croat, Serb	1750		
Ribarić		1098	1003	Croat	1673		
Batinić	I1a1b1a1e2d3~FT36856	1094	1033	Croat, Serb	1917		
Jokić		1090	953	Croat, Serb, Montenegrin			
Krmpotić		1090	1003	Croat			
Lipovac		1090	969	Croat, Serb, Bosniak	1749		
Spajić		1089	1040	Croat	1917		
Malnar		1088	924	Croat			
Slunjski		1087	982	Croat	1925		
Zrilić		1086	1052	Croat			
Šakić		1083	925	Croat	1750		
Zajec		1080	963	Croat			
Dragić		1078	928	Croat, Serb	1750		
Radulović		1078	887	Serb, Croat, Roma			
Šantić		1078	911	Croat			
Maleš		1077	992	Croat, Serb	1749		
Vučetić		1077	910	Croat, Serb, Montenegrin	17th century		

== See also ==
- Lists of most common surnames in European countries

== Bibliography ==
- NRC (2008). Enciklopedija hrvatskih prezimena (in Croatian). Zagreb: Nacionalni rodoslovni centar.
- Božić, Ivan (2018-10-28). "Imamo popis više od 33.000 prezimena u Hrvatskoj te broj ljudi koji nose svako od njih". Srednja.hr (in Croatian). Archived from the original on 2019-06-20.
- DZS (2021). "Popis stanovništva, kućanstava i stanova u Republici Hrvatskoj 2021. godine: Imena i prezimena u Republici Hrvatskoj". Državni zavod za statistiku (in Croatian).
- Serbian DNA Project (2025). "Y-DNA Results Overview". FamilyTreeDNA.
- AC (2025). "Pretraži našu zbirku povijesnih izvora". Acta Croatica (in Croatian).
