= Poljak =

Poljak may refer to:

- Poljak (surname), a South Slavic surname
- Poljak, Sanski Most, a village in Bosnia
