= Gavran =

Gavran may refer to:

- Gavran, Azerbaijan, a village near Yardimli
- Gavran (surname)
