= Pavlics =

Pavlics is a Hungarian-language form of the Slavic surname Pavlić or Pavlič. Notable people with the surname include:

- Ferenc Pavlics (1928–2024), Hungarian-born American mechanical engineer, a developer of the Apollo Lunar rover
- Irén Pavlics (Slovene: Irena Pavlič), Hungarian Slovene author and editor
