= Sokac =

Sokac may refer to:

- Sokač, a surname
- Šokac, plural Šokci, a South Slavic ethnic group
  - Šokac dialect
