= Crnković =

Crnković (pronounced [tsř̩ːŋkoʋitɕ]) is a Croatian surname.

Notable people with the name include:

- House of Crnković, a medieval Croatian noble family
- Krešimir Crnković (born 1995), Croatian biathlete and cross country skier
- Milan Crnković (1925–1998), Croatian children's literature professor and critic
- Tomislav Crnković (disambiguation), multiple people
- Zlatko Crnković (disambiguation), multiple people
