= Dušan Marić =

Serbian politician

Dušan Marić (Serbian Cyrillic: Душан Марић; born 10 January 1963) is a Serbian politician. He served in the National Assembly of Serbia from 2008 to 2012 as a member of the far-right Serbian Radical Party. Marić subsequently left the Radicals and joined the Serbian Progressive Party. He began a new term in the National Assembly in July 2021 and is also the president (i.e., speaker) of the municipal assembly of Velika Plana.

== Early life and career ==
Marić was born in the village of Šemenovci, Kupres, in what was then the People's Republic of Bosnia and Herzegovina in the Federal People's Republic of Yugoslavia. He has worked as a journalist since 1983 and was at one time the editor of Velika Srbija, the Radical Party's journal. Between 1991 and 1995, he fought in the Croatian War of Independence and the Bosnian War; in the latter conflict, he served as a company commander in the Army of Republika Srpska. He primarily saw combat near his home area of Kupres. Marić moved to Velika Plana in Serbia in 1995. He was a correspondent for the Pale paper Javnosti from 1995 to 1998 and for the Republika Srpska paper Oslobođenje (not to be confused with the better-known Sarajevo newspaper of the same name) from 1998 to 2005. He has also written for several other papers and has authored eight books, mostly concerning twentieth-century conflicts in Bosnia and Herzegovina.

== Politician ==
=== Radical Party ===
Marić received the 213th position on the Radical Party's electoral list in the 2007 Serbian parliamentary election. The party won eighty-one seats, and he was not selected for a mandate. (From 2000 to 2011, parliamentary mandates in Serbia were assigned to listed candidates at the discretion of successful parties and coalitions, and it was common practice for mandates to be awarded out of numerical order. Marić could have been awarded a mandate despite his low position on the list, but he was not.)

He was given the 125th position on the Radical Party's list in the 2008 parliamentary election. The party won seventy-eight seats, and he was on this occasion selected for a mandate. The results of the election were initially inconclusive, but a new government was eventually formed by the Democratic Party, the Socialist Party of Serbia, and other parties, and the Radicals served in opposition. The Radical Party experienced a serious split following the 2008 election, with several members joining the breakaway Progressive Party under the leadership of Tomislav Nikolić and Aleksandar Vučić. Marić initially chose to remain with the Radicals.

Marić was one of the more active members of the 2008–12 parliament, speaking over four hundred times. In 2011, he condemned Angelina Jolie in the Serbian parliament for what he described as Jolie's "demonization" of Serbs in her film, In the Land of Blood and Honey. Concurrent with his tenure in the republican parliament, he also served his first term as president of the Velika Plana municipal assembly.

Serbia's political system was reformed in 2011, such that assembly mandates were awarded in numerical order to candidates on successful lists. Marić received the twentieth position on the Radical Party's list for the 2012 parliamentary election. The party did not cross the electoral threshold to win representation in the assembly. In 2015, Marić left the Radicals and joined the Progressives.

=== Progressive Party ===
Marić was an assistant to the mayor of Velika Plana from 2016 to 2020.

He was given the 164th position on the Progressive Party's Aleksandar Vučić — Serbia Is Winning list in the 2016 parliamentary election. The list won 131 mandates, and he was not returned. He received the 201st position on the successor Aleksandar Vučić — For Our Children list in the 2020 parliamentary election. This list won a landslide majority victory with 188 mandates. He was once again not initially elected, but he received a mandate on 7 July 2021 as the replacement for Maja Grbić, a Progressive Party member who had resigned a few days earlier.

Marić also received the tenth position on the Progressive Party's list for the Velika Plana municipal assembly in the 2020 Serbian local elections and was elected when the list won a majority victory with twenty-eight mandates. He was chosen as president of the assembly for a second time in August 2020.
