= Kosic =

Kosic may refer to:

- Kosić (disambiguation), a South Slavic surname
- Košić, a South Slavic surname
