= Štimac =

Štimac (Serbo-Croatian pronunciation: [ʃtǐːmats]) is a Serbo-Croatian surname.

It is one of the most common surnames in the Primorje-Gorski Kotar County of Croatia.

Notable people with the name include:

- Andrej Štimac (born 1979), Croatian basketball player
- Craig Stimac (1954–2009), American Major League Baseball catcher
- Greg Stimac (born 1976), American artist
- Ida Štimac (born 2000), Croatian alpine skier
- Igor Štimac (born 1967), retired Croatian footballer
- Jonny Stimac, American vocalist and guitarist of the band Goodbye Elliott
- Vladimir Štimac (born 1987), Serbian basketballer
- Slavko Štimac (born 1960), Yugoslav and Serbian actor
