= Grbić =

Grbić (Serbian: Грбић) is a Serbo-Croatian surname. It may refer to:

- Adrian Grbić (born 1996), Austrian footballer
- Borivoje Grbić (born 1972), Serbian comic-book and graphic novel creator
- Branislav Grbić, the Kosovo "Minister for Return and Communities"
- Čedo Grbić (1921–1994), Croatian Serb politician
- Denis Grbić (born 1986), Slovenian footballer
- Itana Grbić (born 1996), Montenegrin handball player
- Ivo Grbić (1931–2020), Croatian artist
- Ivo Grbić (born 1996), Croatian football goalkeeper
- Maja Grbić (born 1980), Serbian politician
- Marija Omaljev-Grbić (born 1982), Croatian actress
- Matija Grbić (1505–1559), Croatian-German humanist, classical philologist and translator native
- Miodrag Grbić (1901–1969), Serbian archeologist and custos
- Miraj Grbić (born 1976), Bosnian-American actor
- Nikola Grbić (born 1973), Serbian volleyball player
- Petar Grbić (born 1988), Montenegrin footballer
- Rade Grbić (1870–1910) United States Navy sailor and a recipient of the Medal of Honor
- Vladimir Grbić (born 1970), former Serbian volleyball player
