= Tomaš =

Tomaš may refer to:

- Tomaš, Croatia, a village near Bjelovar
- Tomaš (surname), Croatian surname
