= Vranković =

Origin
- Language: Croatian
- Meaning: patronymic from Vranko

Other names
- Variant form: Vrankić

Vranković is a mostly Croatian, and sometimes Serbian and Slovak surname, derived from the male given name Vranko. It is one of the more common Croatian surnames. About 470 individuals have it as their surname, chiefly Croats, and in lesser numbers Serbs (around Koprivnica) and Slovaks (around Ilok).

== Etymology ==
In the opinion of priest Dr. Karl Jurišić, the surname Vranković probably comes from a wide range of patronymic surnames derived from the ancestor's name, which in this case bore the name "Vranko", i.e. "Franko" (= Franjo), and the possessive supplement "-ov" and suffix i.e. "-ić". A similar view is taken by academic Petar Simunović.

== Origin ==
According to the Encyclopedia of Croatian Surnames (in Croatian, Enciklopediji hrvatskih prezimena), the Vranković family name first appeared in Blato na Cetina. The surname extremely similar origin and meaning to the almost identical surname Franković (also the Franić family name) in use today, from which Vranković seems to have spread over all parts of Croatia over the centuries, and during the 19th and 20th centuries the world. On the island of Hvar, on which they are most numerous today, the Vrankovićs are first mentioned in the mid-15th century, in the village of Dol, from where they moved to Stari Grad, and towards the end of the 18th century to the village of Svirče. It is interesting to mention that the Vrankovic family from the Old Town, just before the collapse of Austria-Hungary empire, received Hungarian nobility status.

== Prevalence ==
According to the Encyclopedia of Croatian Surnames, published by the National Genealogy Center in 2008, a relatively large number of Vrankovićs have been born in Svirče, on the island of Hvar in the past 100 years, where one in every seventh person has the surname Vrankovic.

Vranković is present in most of Croatian counties, with the largest number living in Rijeka, Zagreb and Split.

== Notable people with the surname ==
- Ivan Vranković (born 1830), Croatian politician, Prime Minister of the Provincial Government of the province of Dalmatia, Austro-Hungarian Empire
- Josip Marija Vranković (born 19th century), Croatian employee in arts and culture
- Belizar Vranković (born 19th century), Croatian antique and Greek enthusiast
- Ante Vranković (born 1895), Croatian craftsman and artist
- Dinko Vranković (born 1906), priest
- Đuro Vranković (born 1927), Croatian surgeon and university professor
- Anica Vranković (born 1939), Croatian visual artist and pedagogue
- Dinko Vranković (born 1939), visual artist, educator, educational adviser
- Ivan Vranković (b. 1944), Croatian engineer
- Vladimir Vranković (born 1950), State Secretary and engineer
- Stojko Vranković (born 1964), Croatian basketball player
- Josip Vranković (born 1968), Croatian basketball player
- David Vranković (born 1993), Australian footballer
- Josip Vranković (born 1968), Croatian basketball coach and former player
- Mladen Vranković (1937–2021), Croatian manager and football player

== See also ==
- Vranić (surname)
