= Baričević =

Baričević or the Americanized Baricevic is a Croatian surname.

- Anton Baričević (1925– 2003), Croatian-Canadian strongman
- Danica Baričević (born 1972), Australian-born Croatian politician
- John Baricevic, American former judge
- Rudolf Baričević (1914–1999), Croatian WW2 veteran

== See also ==
- Borićević dynasty
- Boričevci
