= Posavec =

Posavec may refer to:

- Posavec, Slovenia, a village near Radovljica
- Posavec (surname), a Croatian surname

== See also ==
- Posavac, a horse breed
