= Ivić =

Ivić or Ivic (Cyrillic script: Ивић) is a South Slavic patronymic surname derived from the given name Ivo and a occasionally a masculine given name. It may refer to:

Surname

- Aleksandar Ivić (1949–2020), Serbian mathematician
- Frank Ivic, U.S. soccer defender
- Ilija Ivić (born 1971), retired Serbian footballer and sports director
- Ilija Ivić (born 1991), Croatian footballer
- Milka Ivić (1923–2011), Serbian linguist
- Miloš Ivić (born 1985), Serbian footballer
- Pavle Ivić (1924–1999), leading South Slavic and general dialectologist and phonologist
- Tomislav Ivić (1933–2011), former Croatian football manager
- Vladimir Ivić (born 1977), Serbian footballer

Given name

- Ivić Pašalić (born 1960), Croatian right-wing politician

== See also ==
- Venezuelan Institute for Scientific Research, known as IVIC (Instituto Venezolano de Investigaciones Científicas)
