= Santic =

Santic may refer to:

- Santic (record producer), stage name of Leonard Chin, Jamaican reggae producer
- Šantić, South Slavic surname
- Santic (company), a cycling company, sponsor of several teams including Santic–Wibatech, Team Ljubljana Gusto Santic, Team Vorarlberg Santic, RTS-Santic Racing Team
