= Pintarič =

Pintarič is a surname. People with the surname include:

- Robert Pintarič, a Slovenian cyclist
- Branko Pintarič, a Slovenian writer, actor and theatre organizer
- Blaža Pintarič, a Slovenian cyclist
- Matija Pintarič, a Slovenian ice hockey player

== See also ==
- Pintarić
