= Bartolović =

Bartolović is a surname. The Croatian census of 2011 listed it as one of the most common surnames in Rešetari.

Notable people with the surname include:

- Mladen Bartolović, a Bosnian footballer
- Hrvoje Bartolović, a Croatian chess problemist

== See also ==
- Bartulović
