= Tomljanović =

Tomljanović is a Croatian surname.

It is one of the most common surnames in the Lika-Senj County of Croatia.

It may refer to:

- Ajla Tomljanović, Croatian-Australian tennis player

== See also ==
- Tomljenović
- Tomić
