= Mršić =

Mršić is a Serbo-Croatian surname, derived from the personal characteristic of being "thin, skinny" (mršav). It may refer to:

- Antonio Mršić (born 1987), Croatian footballer
- Ivan Mršić (born 1949), Croatian and North American retired footballer
- Stanko Mršić (born 1955), Serbian football manager and a former player
- Dragomir Mršić (born 1969), Swedish actor (original Serbian)
- Damir Mršić (born 1970) Serbian-born Turkish professional basketball player
- Veljko Mršić (born 1971), retired Croatian (Serbian nationality) basketball player and currently a basketball coach
- Simon Mršić (born 1991), American and Bosnian soccer player
- Zvonimir Mršić (born 1966), Croatian politician

== See also ==
- Mršići, Serbian village in Republika Srpska (Bosnia)
- Mršević, surname
- Mrsić, surname
