= Dujmovits =

Dujmovits is a surname. Notable people with the surname include:

- Julia Dujmovits (born 1987), Austrian snowboarder
- Ralf Dujmovits (born 1961), German mountain climber

== See also ==
- Dujmović
