= Jelicich =

Jelicich is a surname. Notable people with the surname include:

- Dorothy Jelicich (1928–2015), New Zealand politician
- Stephen Jelicich (1923–2015), New Zealand architect and historian

== See also ==
- Jeličić
