= Tonkovich =

Tonkovich is a surname. Notable people with the surname include:

- Andy Tonkovich (1922–2006), American basketball player
- Dan R. Tonkovich (1946–2002), American politician

== See also ==
- Tonković
