= Voinovich =

Voinovich, Voynovich or Vojnović (Russian: Войнович) may refer to:

- Aljoša Vojnović (born 1985), Croatian footballer
- Dejan Vojnović (born 1975), Croatian athlete
- Đorđe Vojnović (1833–1895), politician from Dalmatia
- Emil Vojnović (1851–1927), Austro-Hungarian Army general and historian
- George Voinovich (1936–2016), US politician, former Mayor, Governor, and Senator
- Goran Vojnović (born 1980), Slovenian writer, poet, screenwriter, film director
- Ivo Vojnović (1857–1929), writer from Dubrovnik
- Konstantin Vojnović (1832–1903), politician and academic from Croatia
- Lujo Vojnović (1864–1951), politician and diplomat from Montenegro
- Lyanco Vojnović (born 1997), Brazilian footballer
- Maja Vojnović (born 1998), Slovenian handball player
- Mark Voynovich (1750–1807), Russian admiral
- Milan Vojnovic (born 1971), professor of data science at the London School of Economics
- Nataša Vojnović (born 1979), Bosnian Serb model
- Vladimir Voinovich (1932–2018), Russian writer

== See also ==
- House of Vojnović, a Serb noble house from Herceg Novi
- Vojinovac
- Vojnovac
- Vujanović
- Vujinovača
