= Burić =

Burić is a South Slavic surname common in Croatia and Bosnia. It may refer to:

- Andrej Burić (born 1989), Croatian cross-country skier
- Benjamin Burić (born 1990), Bosnian Croat handball player
- Damir Burić, several Croatian people
- Ivica Burić (born 1963), Croatian basketball coach and former player
- Jasmin Burić (born 1987), Bosnian football goalkeeper
- Lara Burić (born 2003), Croatian handball player
- Majda Burić (born 1979), Croatian politician
- Marija Pejčinović Burić (born 1963), Croatian politician
- Mario Burić (born 1991), Croatian footballer
- Mia Buric (born 1982), Croat-German tennis player
- Mirsada Burić (born 1970), Bosnian long-distance runner
- Nikola Burić (born 1996), Croatian football forward
- Senjamin Burić (born 1990), Bosnian handball player, twin brother of Benjamin
- Viktor Burić (1897–1983), Croatian archbishop
- Željko Burić (born 1955), Croatian ophthalmologist and politician
- Zlatko Burić (born 1953), Croatian Danish actor
