= Čović =

Čović is a surname that may refer to:

- Adrian Covic (born 1967), Romanian nephrologist
- Ante Čović (born 1975), Croatian Australian soccer player
- Ante Čović (Croatian footballer) (born 1975), Croatian soccer player
- Dragan Čović (born 1956), Croat politician
- Mehmedalija Čović (born 1986), Bosnian football player
- Nebojša Čović (born 1958), Serbian politician
- Žana Čović (born 1989), Croatian handball player

== See also ==
- COVIC, the abbreviation for the Colonial Office Visual Instruction Committee
