= Sertić =

Sertić is a Croatian surname. Notable people with the surname include:

- Ivan Sertić (born 1985), Croatian footballer
- Grégory Sertic (born 1989), French footballer of Croatian descent
- Kornelija Sertić (1897–1988), Croatian tuberculosis researcher and a pioneer for women in medicine
- Tomislav Sertić (1902–1945), Croatian soldier
- Vladimir Sertić (1901–1983), Croatian virologist
