= Sinkovitz =

Sinkovitz is a Slavic-originated surname. Notable people with the surname include:

- Frank Sinkovitz (1923–1989), American football player

== See also ==
- Sinković
- Imre Sinkovits (1928–2001), Hungarian actor
