= Đaković =

Đaković (Cyrillic: Ђаковић; also transliterated Djaković) is a surname. Notable people with the surname include:

- Dario Đaković (born 1987), Austrian footballer
- Đuro Đaković (1886–1929), Yugoslav politician
- Isaija Đaković (1635–1708), Metropolitan of Krušedol

== See also ==
- Đakovica
- Đakovo
- Đoković
