= Jozić =

Jozić is a surname. It is a patronymic of Jozo.

It is one of the most common surnames in the Bjelovar-Bilogora County of Croatia.

Notable people with the surname include:

- Davor Jozić (born 1960), Yugoslav footballer
- Ivica Jozić (born 1969), Bosnian football player
- Mario Jozić (born 1972), Croatian football goalkeeper
- Mirko Jozić (born 1940), Croatian football coach
- Nikola Jozić (born 1982), German-born Serbian football defender
