= Kožulj =

Kožulj is a Serbo-Croatian surname. Notable people with the surname include:

- Gordan Kožulj (born 1976), Croatian swimmer
- Zvonimir Kožulj (born 1993), Bosnian football midfielder

== See also ==
- Kožul
