= Komnenović =

Komnenović is a Serbo-croatian surname, derived from the name Komnen (Greek: Komnenós). It may refer to:

- Komnenović brotherhood, in Banjani
- Mitar Komnenović
- Marko Komnenović
- Mihailo Komnenović (fl. 1779)
- Mehmet Komnenović, Bosnian dancer
- Petar Komnenović, count
- Mirko Komnenović (1870–1941), mayor of Herceg Novi
- Jelica Komnenović (b. 1960) former Yugoslav basketball player
- Dragan Komnenović, Serbian footballer
- Pavle Komnenović, Serbian racer

== See also ==
- Komnenić, surname
- Komnenos, Byzantine dynasty
- Komlenović, surname
- Komljenović, surname
