= Udovičić =

Udovičić is a Croatian surname. The name comes from a kinship term meaning "son of a widow" in Serbo-Croatian. It originated from the Sesar family from Kočerin, and is found in Podvranić. The name also has a historical presence in Istria, as well as Žabica, where it was brought by a woman fleeing a plague in Mostar, where the name has a long record among local Muslims.

- Dejan Udovičić (born 1970), Serbian water polo coach
- Frank Udovicic (born 1966), Australian botanist
- Stefan Udovičić (born 1991), Bosnian footballer
- Vanja Udovičić (born 1982), Serbian politician
- Žarko Udovičić (born 1987), Serbian footballer
