= Komlenović =

Komlenović is a Serbian surname. It may refer to:

- Komlenović noble family, in Hum
  - Pavle Komlenović, knez
- Nikola Komlenović, Yugoslav geologist
- Uroš Komlenović, Serbian journalist and writer
- Vasilije Komlenović, Montenegrin footballer
- Vladanko Komlenović, Bosnian footballer
- Radoslav Komlenović, Serbian politician

== See also ==
- Komljenović, surname
- Komnenović, surname
- Komlenići, village in Croatia
- Komlenac, village in Bosnia and Herzegovina
