= Bekavac =

Bekavac is a surname. Notable people with the surname include:

- Blaženko Bekavac (born 1975), Croatian footballer
- Luka Bekavac (born 1976), Croatian writer
- Nancy Y. Bekavac, American college administrator
