= Kuzmić =

Kuzmić is a patronymic surname of South Slavic origin derived form the given name Kuzma . (Serbian: Кузмић) Notable people with the surname include:

- Marko Kuzmić (c. 1695–c. 1735), Croatian writer
- Ognjen Kuzmić (born 1990), Serbian basketball player
- Srđan Kuzmić (born 2004), Slovenian footballer
- Željko Kuzmić (born 1984), Serbian footballer

== See also ==
- Mikloš Küzmič, Miklós Küzmics (1737–1804), Hungarian Slovene priest and writer
- Števan Küzmič or István Küzmics (c. 1723–1779), Hungarian Slovene writer
- Kuzmich
