= Dadić =

Dadić (Croatian pronunciation: [dǎːditɕ]) is a Bosnian and Croatian surname. Notable people with the surname include:

- Edi Dadić (born 1993), Croatian cross country skier
- Ivan Dadić (born 1944), Croatian academic
- Ivona Dadic (born 1993), Austrian heptathlete of Croatian descent
- Mijo Dadić (born 1981), Croatian footballer
- Pavo Dadić (born 1969), Bosnian footballer
