= Škvorc =

Škvorc is a surname. Notable people with the surname include:

- Dino Škvorc (born 1990), Croatian footballer
- Filip Škvorc (born 1991), Croatian footballer
- Laura Škvorc (born 1997), Slovenian footballer
