= Komnenić =

Komnenić is a Serbian surname, derived from the name Komnen (Greek: Komnenós). It may refer to:

- Milan Komnenić, Serbian writer
- Boris Komnenić (b. 1957), Serbian actor
- Petar Komnenić, Montenegrin journalist
- Vaso Komnenić, Serbian athlete

== See also ==
- Komnenović, surname
- Komnenos, Byzantine dynasty
