= Kolaric (surname) =

Kolarić or Kolarič is a gender-neutral Slavic surname that may refer to

- Jana Kolarič (born 1954), Slovene author and translator
- Nina Kolarič (born 1986), Slovenian long jumper
- Pajo Kolarić (1821–1876), Croatian composer
- Zlata Kolarić-Kišur (1894–1990), Croatian writer
