= Majić =

Majić or Majic is a South Slavic matronymic surname formed by adding the Slavic diminutive suffix -ić to the feminine given name Maja. There is an alternative origin of the surname, that is almost exclusively tied to the Montenegrins bearing the name. It originated from the Maritime clan of “Maine", near Budva, Montenegro. The original bajraktari (Montenegrin bannerlord) family of Maine used to be called like that because of their height. (Lat. Major - great). Today the remnants of the family can only be traced to the Majić family in Zeta, Montenegro.

Notable people with this surname include:

- Danny Majic (born 1990), Croatian American record producer
- Edita Majić (born 1970), Croatian sister of the Carmelites and former theater and film actress
- Josip Majić (born 1994), Croatian footballer
- Karlo Majić (born 1998), Croatian footballer
- Mirjana Emina Majić (born 1932), Croatian writer, poet and translator
- Mirko Majić (born 1989), Montenegrin handball player
- Vigor Majić, Serbian scientist
- Miodrag Majić (born 1969), Serbian legal scholar, judge and author.
- Filip Majić, Montenegrin Orthodox Christian priest and one of the more prominent people in politics of the Principality and Kingdom of Montenegro at the turn of the 20th century.
