= Mršići =

Bosnia and Herzegovina village

Coordinates: 44.234°N 18.951°E

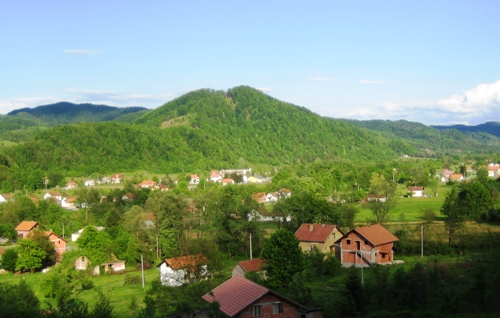
Mršići

Mršići (Cyrillic: Мршићи) is a village in Vlasenica, Republika Srpska, Bosnia and Herzegovina.
