= Glavaš =

Glavaš (Serbian Cyrillic: Главаш) is a Serbian and Croatian family name.

People with the surname include:

- Luka Glavas (born 1985), Australian-born footballer
- Branimir Glavaš (born 1956), Croatian former major general and politician
- Marin Glavaš (born 1992), Croatian footballer
- Radoslav Glavaš (senior) (1863–1913), Herzegovinian Croat Franciscan
- Radoslav Glavaš (junior) (1909–1945), Herzegovinian Croat Franciscan
- Robert Glavaš (born 1962), Slovenian general
- Stanoje Glavaš (1763–1815), Serbian hajduk and hero
- Vlatko Glavaš (born 1962), Bosnian footballer
