= Kraljić =

Kraljić, Krajlic is a Croatian surname. Croatian: Kralj means 'king'. Notable people with the surname include:

- Edi Kraljić, Croatian singer
- Nina Kraljić (born 1992), Croatian singer-songwriter and voice actress
- Peter Kraljic, author of Kraljic matrix
