= Zečević =

Zečević (Serbian: Зечевић) is a surname. Notable people with the surname include:

- Aleksandar Zečević (born 1996), Serbian basketball player in the Israeli Basketball Premier League
- Dejan Zečević (born 1972), Serbian film director
- Ksenija Zečević (born 1956), Serbian pianist and composer
- Marko Zečević (born 1990), Serbian footballer
- Milorad Zečević (born 1972), Serbian footballer born in Paris
- Saša Zečević (born 1983), Serbian footballer
- Zlatko Zečević (born 1983), Serbian football goalkeeper
- Žarko Zečević (born 1950), Serbian retired basketball player, former football administrator, and current businessman
