= Raguž =

Raguž is a Croatian surname. Notable people with the surname include:

- Ivica Raguž (born 1968), Croatian footballer
- Marianna Raguž (born 1975), Croatian basketball player
- Marko Raguž (born 1998), Austrian footballer of Bosnian Croat descent
- Martin Raguž (born 1958), Bosnian Croat politician
