= Adrian Covic =

Romanian physician and nephrologist

Adrian Covic (born May 6, 1967) is a Romanian physician and specialist in nephrology.

A native of Iași, his father Mircea is a geneticist, while his mother Maria is a nephrologist. He attended the local Grigore T. Popa University of Medicine and Pharmacy, where he later joined the faculty. In 1999, he became head of the dialysis and kidney transplant section at the C. I. Parhon hospital, advancing to director in 2003. In 2005, he became president of the Romanian Society of Nephrology. He left as hospital director in 2012, becoming head of a nephrology clinic.

In 2013, the National Integrity Agency found that Covic had been in a conflict of interest while hospital director, when he held positions in seven private companies, including two that did business with his hospital. As a penalty, he was barred from holding any leadership position or public office for three years. The following year, investigators alleged that Covic had assets totaling €407,000 for which he could not account for based on his physician's salary.
