= Kordić =

Kordić is a Croatian and Montenegrin surname.

Notable people with the name include:

- Dan Kordic (born 1971) and John Kordic (1965–1992), two Croatian Canadian brothers who were hockey players.
- Dario Kordić (born 1971), Bosnian-Croat politician and military commander, and convicted war criminal
- Krešimir Kordić (born 1981), Bosnian-Herzegovinian footballer
- Mario Kordić (born 1972), Bosnian Croat politician and physician
- Marko Kordić (born 1995), Montenegrin footballer
- Šaleta Kordić (born 1993), Montenegrin footballer
- Snježana Kordić (born 1964), Croatian linguist
- Toni Kordic (born 1964), Canadian basketball player
