= Pavković =

Pavković (Serbian Cyrillic: Павковић, pronounced [pǎːʋkoʋitɕ]) is a South Slavic surname. It may refer to:

- Miljan Pavković (born 1981), basketball player
- Nebojša Pavković (1946–2025), Serbian military officer and convicted war criminal, chief of the General Staff of Yugoslavia (2000–2002)
- Slobodan Pavković (born 1955), footballer
