= Maričić =

Maričić (Serbian: Маричић) is a Serbian and a Croatian surname. It may refer to:

- Damir Maričić (born 1959), Croatian footballer
- Ines Maričić (born 1988), Croatian 9 pin bowling player
- Veljko Maričić (1907–1973), Croatian actor
