= Šoštarić =

Šoštarić (also spelt Šoštarič, or Šostaric) is a surname. The Croatian census of 2011 listed it as one of the most common surnames in Brdovec, Jesenje, and Zrinski Topolovac.

Notable people with the surname include:

- Mario Šoštarić, a Slovenian handball player
- Franjo Šoštarić, a Yugoslav footballer
- Nenad Šoštarić, a Croatian handball coach
- Edvard Šoštarič, a Slovenian football referee
- Drago Šoštarić, a Slovenian gymnast

== See also ==
- Šoštarić Vrabac
