= Ćorić =

Ćorić (Croatian pronunciation: [tɕǒːritɕ]) is a Croatian surname. Notable people with the surname include:

- Ante Ćorić (born 1997), Croatian footballer
- Borna Ćorić (born 1996), Croatian tennis player
- Dino Ćorić (born 1990), Bosnian footballer
- Josip Ćorić (born 1988), Croatian-born Bosnian-Herzegovinian footballer
- Marijan Ćorić (born 1995), Croatian footballer
- Tomislav Ćorić (born 1979), Croatian politician
- Valentin Ćorić (born 1956), former Bosnian Croat official in the Croatian Republic of Herzeg-Bosnia
