= Rašić =

Rašić is a common Serbian and Croatian surname. It may refer to:

- Aleksandar Rašić (b. 1984), Serbian basketball player
- Branko Rašić (b. 1976), Serbian footballer
- Damir Rašić (b. 1988), Croatian footballer
- Danijel Rašić (b. 1988), Croatian footballer
- Federico Rasic (b. 1992), Argentine footballer of Croatian-Serbian descent
- Nikola "Kole" Rašić (1839–1898), Serbian revolutionary
- Mario Rašić (b. 1989), Croatian footballer
- Milan Rašić (b. 1985), Serbian volleyball player
- Milena Rašić (b. 1990), Serbian volleyball player
- Rale Rašić (b. 1935), Serbian-Australian footballer
