= Dodig =

Dodig is a surname. Notable people with this surname include:

- Goran Dodig, Croatian politician, president of Croatian Demochristian Party
- Ivan Dodig, Croatian tennis player
- Markica Dodig, Bosnian bocce player, two-time Bosnia and Herzegovina Sportsperson of the Year
- Matej Dodig, Croatian tennis player
- Radoslav Dodig, Croatian archaeologist and journalist
- Vladimir Dodig Trokut, Croatian artist, art collector and museologist

== See also ==
- Dodik
