= Bartulović =

Bartulović is a surname. The Croatian census of 2011 listed it as one of the most common surnames in Gradac, Split-Dalmatia County, Zagvozd and Slivno, Dubrovnik-Neretva County.

Notable people with the surname include:

- Niko Bartulović, the founder of ORJUNA
- Mladen Bartulović, a Croatian footballer
- Gabrijela Bartulović, a Croatian handball player

== See also ==
- Bartolović
- Damir Bartulovič
