= Ivan Gavran =

Serbian footballer

Personal information
- Full name: Ivan Gavran
- Date of birth: 12 April 1980 (age 46)
- Place of birth: Pristina, SFR Yugoslavia
- Height: 1.84 m (6 ft 0 in)
- Position: Striker

Youth career
- 1997–1999: Priština

Senior career*
| Years | Team | Apps | (Gls) |
| 1999–2003 | Napredak Kruševac | | |
| 2003–2004 | Kärnten | | |
| 2004–2005 | Žepče | 0 | (0) |
| 2005–2006 | Spartak Varna | | |
| 2006–2009 | Dobrudzha Dobrich | | |
| 2009–2011 | Šumadija Radnički | 3 | (0) |
| 2010 | → Sloga Batočina (loan) | | |
| 2011–2012 | FK Skopje | | |
| 2012–2014 | Niki Volos | | |
| 2014–2017 | Car Konstantin | | |
- * Club domestic league appearances and goals

Ivan Gavran (Serbian Cyrillic: Иван Гавран; born 12 April 1980) is a former Serbian footballer who played for Napredak Kruševac and Dobrudzha Dobrich amongst other clubs.

Born in Pristina (SR Serbia, SFR Yugoslavia), he previously played with FK Priština in the First League of FR Yugoslavia, FK Napredak Kruševac Austrian second division with FC Kärnten, Bosnia and Herzegovina with NK Žepče, FC Spartak Varna, Bulgarian third division with FC Dobrudzha Dobrich., Serbian League West with Šumadija Radnički. Since ending his playing career he has become youth team coach at FK Župa Aleksandrovac.
