= Pintarić =

Pintarić is a surname. The Croatian census of 2011 listed it as one of the most common surnames in Varaždin County (Lepoglava, Varaždin and Klenovnik), Koprivnica, Dekanovec, Mala Subotica, Nedelišće and Sveti Juraj na Bregu.

Notable people with the surname include:

- Vinko Pintarić, a Croatian serial killer
- Pavao Pintarić, a Yugoslav fencer

== See also ==
- Pintarič
