= Zelić =

Zelic or Zelić (Serbian Cyrillic: Зелић) is a Serbian and Croatian surname that may refer to:

- Antonio Zelić (born 1994), Croatian bobsledder
- Gerasim Zelić (1752–1828), Serbian Orthodox cleric
- Ivan Zelic (born 1978), Australian football player
- Lucy Zelić (born 1986), Australian television presenter, sister of Ivan and Ned
- Ned Zelic (born 1971), Australian football player, brother of Ivan
- Obrad Zelić (born 1946), Serbian physician
