= Topalović =

Topalović (Serbian Cyrillic: Toпaлoвић) is a Serbo-Croatian surname, derived from topal, a Turkism meaning "lame, cripple". It is borne by ethnic Serbs, ethnic Bosniaks and ethnic Croats. It may refer to:

- Cooper Woods-Topalovic (born 2000), Australian freestyle skier
- Enes Topalović (born 1963), Bosnian poet
- Đorđe Topalović (born 1977), Serbian retired footballer
- Mušan Topalović (1957–1993), Bosnian army commander
- Mato Topalović (1812–1862), Croatian poet
- Petar Topalović (1840–1891), Serbian general, minister of defense, minister of construction and manager of the Military Academy
- Slobodan Topalović (1952–1994), Serbian retired footballer
- Vjenceslav Topalović (born 1932), Croatian publicist
- Vjenceslav Topalović (born 1932), Croatian scientist, researcher and writer of Croatian history
- Živko Topalović (1886–1972), Yugoslav socialist politician
- Željko Topalović (born 1972), Serbian hotelier and former basketball player
