= Primorac =

Primorac (pronounced [prǐːmorats]) is a common family name found in Croatia, Bosnia and Herzegovina and Serbia.

Notable people with the surname include:

- Boro Primorac (b. 1954), Bosnian association football coach
- Dragan Primorac (b. 1965), Croatian forensic scientist and former science minister
- Igor Primorac (b. 1945), Croatian philosopher
- Ivana Primorac (b. 1965), Croatian-British make-up artist
- Jure Primorac (b. 1981), Croatian footballer
- Karlo Primorac (b. 1984), Croatian footballer
- Rafael Primorac (b. 1954), Croatian film producer
- Zoran Primorac (b. 1969), Croatian table tennis player

== See also ==
- NK Primorac 1929, Croatian association football club
- HNK Primorac Biograd na Moru, Croatian association football club
- VK Primorac Kotor, Montenegrin water polo club
