= Sinković =

Sinković is a Croatian surname.

It is the third most common surname in the Krapina-Zagorje County of Croatia.

It may refer to:

- Martin Sinković, Croatian rower
- Valent Sinković, Croatian rower

== See also ==
- Sinkovitz
