= Kljajić =

Kljajić (Serbian Cyrillic: Кљајић) is a surname found in Serbia, Bosnia and Croatia. It may refer to:

- Dušan Kljajić (born 1963), retired Serbian footballer
- Filip Kljajić (footballer) (born 1990), Serbian footballer
- Filip Kljajić (Yugoslav Partisan) (1913–1943)
- Gabriele Heinen-Kljajic (born 1962), German politician
- Jovan Kljajić (born 2001), Montenegrin basketball player
