= Čačić =

Čačić (pronounced [tʃâtʃitɕ]) is a Croatian and Serbian family name:

- Ante Čačić (born 1953), Croatian football manager
- Božidar Čačić (born 1972), Croatian footballer
- Frane Čačić (born 1980), Croatian footballer
- Mike Cacic (1937–2008), Canadian football defensive lineman
- Nikola Čačić (born 1990), Croatian tennis player
- Radimir Čačić (born 1949), Croatian politician
- Sandra Cacic (born 1974), American tennis player

== See also ==
- Ćaćić (pronounced [t͡ɕât͡ɕit͡ɕ])
