= Biškup =

Biškup is a Croatian surname.

It is among the most common surnames in Varaždin County of Croatia.

It may refer to:

- Damir Biškup (born 1969), Croatian football player
- Dražen Biškup (born 1965), Croatian football player
