= Pavičić =

Pavičić is a Croatian surname that may refer to

- Daniella Pavicic, Croatian-Canadian singer and songwriter
- Domagoj Pavičić (born 1994), Croatian football midfielder
- Jelena Pavičić Vukičević (born 1975), Croatian politician
- Jurica Pavičić (born 1965), Croatian writer, columnist and film critic
- Karen Pavicic (born 1971), Canadian dressage rider
- Viktor Pavičić (1898–1943), Croatian military commander
