= Šikić =

Šikić, Sikic is a Croatian surname. Notable people with the surname include:

- Josip Šikić (born 1929), Croatian footballer
- Nada Šikić (born 1955), Croatian politician
- Tena Šikić (born 1994), Croatian judoka
- Branimir Ivan Sikic, American doctor and scientist
- Nina Šikić, (born 2003), https://nexuscollective.ch/ Artist
