= Zlatko Crnković =

Zlatko Crnković may refer to:

- Zlatko Crnković (translator) (1931–2013), Croatian translator
- Zlatko Crnković (actor) (1936–2012), Croatian actor
