= Ivančević =

Ivančević (Serbian: Иванчевић) is a Serbian and Croatian surname. Notable people with the surname include:

- Andrea Ivančević (born 1984), Croatian athlete
- Radmilo Ivančević (born 1950), Serbian footballer and manager
- Mihajlo Ivančević (born 1999), Serbian footballer
