= Bagarić =

Bagarić is a surname. Notable people with the surname include:

- Dalibor Bagarić (born 1980), Croatian basketball player
- Davor Bagarić (born 1985), Croatian footballer
- Dražen Bagarić (born 1992), Croatian footballer
- Lucija Ćirić Bagarić (born 2004), Croatian tennis player
- Marko Bagarić (born 1985), Croatian-born Qatari handball player
- Matej Bagarić (born 1989), Croatian footballer
- Sandra Bagarić (born 1974), Croatian opera singer and actress
