= Ribic =

Ribic is a spelling without diacritic of South Slavic surnames Ribič or Ribić, both literally meaning the occupation of fisherman.

Notable people with these surnames include:

- Esad Ribić, Croatian comic book artist and animator
- Nicholas Ribic, a.k.a. Nikola Ribić, a Canadian who fought in the Bosnian Serb Army prosecuted for hostage-taking
- Tanja Ribič, Slovenian actress and singer
- Vladimir Ribić, Serbian football player

Melanija Knav's paternal grandmother was born with the Ribić surname.

== See also ==
- Rebić
