= Antunović =

Antunović is a South Slavic surname, a patronymic of Antun.

Notable people with the name include:

- Adrian Antunović (born 1989), Croatian footballer
- Andela Antunović (born 2002), Montenegrin swimmer
- Božidar Antunović (born 1991), Serbian shot putter
- Darko Antunovic HAOK Mladost (born 1972), Croatian volleyball player
- Davor Antunović (born 1979), popular German author and psychotherapist
- Duško Antunović (1947–2012), Croatian water polo player
- Hana Antunovic, Swedish karateka
- Ivan Antunović (1815–1888), Croatian writer
- Mike Antunovic, New Zealand criminal defence lawyer
- Saša Antunović (born 1974), Serbian footballer
- Zdravko Antunović (born 1974), Croatian darts player
- Željka Antunović (born 1955), Croatian politician
