= Borićević dynasty =

First Bosnian dynasty

Borićević
- Country: Banate of Bosnia
- Founded: c. 1150
- Founder: Ban Borić
- Titles: Ban of Bosnia
- Dissolution: c. 1180

The House of Borićević or Borićević dynasty was the first known family who ruled Bosnia as Bans of Bosnia. The first known, and most likely progenitor of the dynasty, was Ban Borić who fl. 1154–63 as a Hungarian vassal.

== History ==
Progenitor of the dynasty, Ban Borić was first mentioned in 1154 and the last in 1163. He was also mentioned in Byzantine Greek historian John Kinnamos' history book covering years 1118–1176. The first certain mention was 1154 regarding the Byzantine-Hungarian war, with engagements in the Danube area, where he was described as taking part in the conflict on the side of Hungarian force, as Hungarian vassal and the ban of Bosnia. Kinnamos described Borić as "exarch (governor) of the land/country of Bosnia". It is uncertain how and when Borić came to rule Bosnia. According to Vladimir Ćorović, he was not a native Bosnian; his homeland is taken to have been central Slavonia. As Hungary became the overlord of Bosnia in the 1130s, it is most likely that Borić was appointed governor in Bosnia as a Hungarian vassal, and was obliged to participate in the march on Braničevo.

Ban Borić had two sons named Borić and Pavao. Borić Borićević and Pavao Borićević had sons named Odola, Čelk and Borić. The extended family also included Detmar and Benedikt (also called Borić). In the 13th century his descendants had possessions on both sides of the river Sava, in the eastern and western parts of what is now the Požega County.

== See also ==
- List of rulers of Bosnia
