= Krpan =

Krpan is a Croatian, Serbian and Slovenian surname. Notable people with the surname include:

- Petar Krpan (born 1974), Croatian footballer
- Vladimir Krpan (1938–2025), Croatian pianist

Fictional characters:

- Martin Krpan, character in Slovenian folklore
