= Kožul =

Kožul is a Serbo-Croatian surname. Notable people with the surname include:

- Deni Kožul (born 1997), Slovene table tennis player
- Kristian Kožul (born 1975), Croatian artist
- Vladimir Kožul (born 1975), Serbian footballer
- Zdenko Kožul (born 1966), Croatian chess grandmaster

== See also ==
- Kožulj
