= Klarić =

Klarić is a Croatian surname. People with the surname include:

- Karla Klarić, a Croatian volleyball player
- Nedjeljka Klarić, a Croatian lawyer and politician
- Danijel Klarić, an Austrian footballer
