= Spajić =

Spajić (Serbian Cyrillic: Спајић, pronounced [spǎːjitɕ]) is a Serbo-Croatian surname. Notable people with the surname include:

- Alejandro Spajić (born 1976), Argentine volleyball player
- Ljubiša Spajić (1926–2004), former Serbian footballer
- Milojko Spajić (born 1987), Prime Minister of Montenegro
- Svetlana Spajić (born 1971), Serbian traditional singer, performer, pedagogue, cultural activist and translator
- Uroš Spajić (born 1993), Serbian footballer

== See also ==
- Stadion NŠC Stjepan Spajić
