= Ivica Jozić =

Bosnia-Herzegovinian footballer (born 1969)

Personal information
- Date of birth: 22 July 1969 (age 57)
- Place of birth: Mostar, SFR Yugoslavia
- Height: 1.76 m (5 ft 9 in)
- Position: Midfielder

Senior career*
Years	Team	Apps	(Gls)
–1991	FK Sarajevo		
1991–1992	STV Horst-Emscher		
1992–1993	Schalke 04 II		
1993–1995	SG Wattenscheid 09	36	(7)
1995	VfL Wolfsburg	4	(0)
1995–1996	FC Antwerp	2	(0)
1996–1997	→ Waregem (loan)	12	(1)
1998	Rot-Weiss Essen	6	(0)
1998–2000	BV Cloppenburg	44	(10)
2000–2002	VfB Oldenburg	56	(17)
2002–2004	SV Wilhelmshaven	36	(6)

International career
1996	Bosnia and Herzegovina	1	(0)
- * Club domestic league appearances and goals

Ivica Jozić (born 22 July 1969) is a Bosnian-Herzegovinian former professional footballer who played as a midfielder. He spent most of his career in Germany.

== International career ==
Jozić earned one cap for the Bosnia and Herzegovina national team, playing the full match in a 0–0 draw against Albania on 24 April 1996 in Zenica.
