= Gavran (surname) =

Gavran is a Serbo-Croatian language surname from a nickname meaning "raven" in Serbo-Croatian. Notable people with the name include:

- Ivan Gavran (born 1980), Serbian footballer
- Luka Gavran (born 2000), Canadian soccer player
- Miro Gavran (born 1961), Croatian writer
