= Dujmović =

Dujmović is a surname. Notable people with the surname include:

- Davor Dujmović (1969–1999), Bosnian Serb actor
- Miroslav Dujmović (born 1978), Bosnian footballer
- Tomislav Dujmović (born 1981), Croatian footballer
- Vida Dujmović, Yugoslav-Canadian computer scientist and mathematician

== See also ==
- Dujmovits
