= Ilija Ivić (footballer, born 1991) =

Croatian footballer

Personal information
- Full name: Ilija Ivić
- Date of birth: 16 July 1991 (age 35)
- Place of birth: Altstätten, Switzerland
- Height: 1.85 m (6 ft 1 in)
- Position: Centre back

Team information
- Current team: FC Widnau

Youth career
- –2008: FC Widnau
- 2008–2010: NK Zagreb U19
- 2010–2012: St. Gallen II

Senior career*
Years	Team	Apps	(Gls)
2012–2016	St. Gallen	12	(0)
2014–2015	→ Schaffhausen (loan)	14	(1)
2015–2016	→ Chiasso (loan)	20	(0)
2016–2017	Chiasso	27	(0)
2017–2019	SC Brühl	55	(6)
2019–	FC Widnau		
- * Club domestic league appearances and goals as of 12:52, 9 August 2019 (UTC)

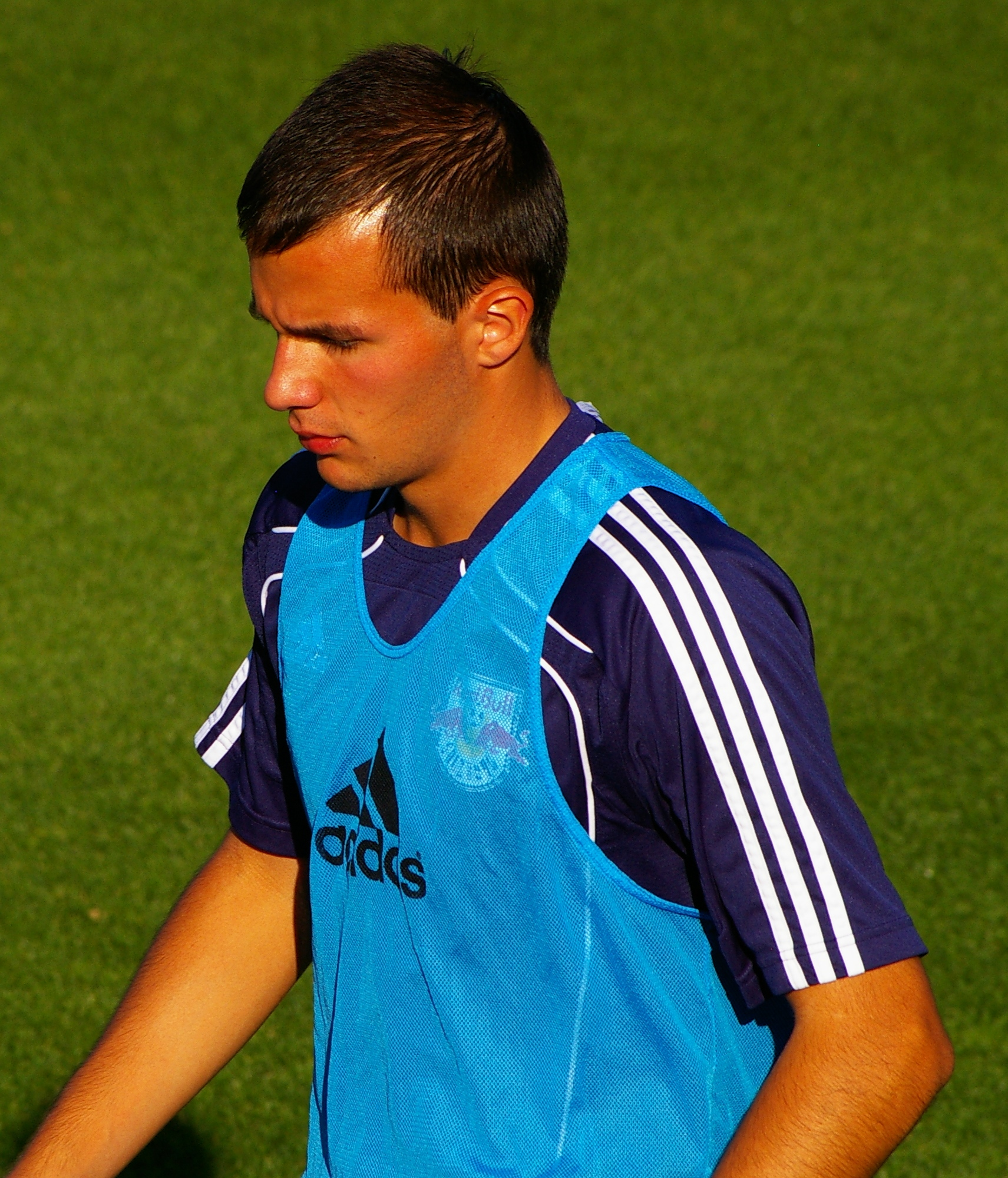
Ilija Ivic

Ilija Ivić (born 16 July 1991) is a Croatian footballer currently playing for FC Widnau.

== Club career ==
As a St. Gallen player, he was out for several months after a cruciate ligament rupture in 2013. On his return, he was loaned to Schaffhausen in summer 2014 and to Chiasso in 2015.

Ahead of the 2019/20 season, Ivić returned to his former youth club FC Widnau.
