= Orlović =

Orlović may refer to:

- Orlović clan, a Serb clan
- Fata Orlović, Bosnian refugee
- Marko Orlović, Serbian musician member of the band Kristali
- Milan Orlović (born 1989), Serbian rugby union player
- Miloje "Mića" Orlović, Serbian TV journalist, caster of several Eurovision Song Contests
- Nikolina Orlović, now known as Nikki Adler, Croatian-German boxer
- Pavle Orlović, semi-mythological Serbian medieval duke

== See also ==
- Grgur Orlovčić, Croatian medieval military officer, captain of Senj with Petar Kružić
