= Valentić =

Valentić is a surname. Notable people with the surname include:

- Adrian Valentić (born 1987), footballer
- Azrudin Valentić (born 1970), Bosnian footballer and manager
- Branka Valentić (born 1968), journalist
- Duško Valentić (1950-2024), Croatian actor
- Kruno Valentić (1932-2000), Croatian actor
- Mario Valentić (born 1980), Croatian actor
- Mirko Valentić (1932–2025), Croatian historian
- Nikica Valentić (born 1950), Croatian politician
- Nikola Valentić (born 1983), Serbian footballer
