= Špoljarić =

Špoljarić is a Croatian surname.

It is one of the most common surnames in the Virovitica-Podravina County of Croatia.

It may refer to:

- Alexander Špoljarić (born 1995), Serbian Cypriot football player
- Danilo Špoljarić (born 1999), Cypriot football player of Croatian and Serbian descent
- Denis Špoljarić (born 1979), Croatian handball player
- Josip Špoljarić (born 1997), Croatian football player
- Matija Špoljarić (born 1997), Cypriot football player of Croatian and Serbian descent
- Milenko Špoljarić (born 1967), Cypriot football player and manager of Croatian and Serbian descent
- Paul Spoljaric (born 1970), Canadian baseball player
