= Frank Ivic =

American soccer player

Frank Ivic was a U.S. soccer defender who earned one cap with the U.S. national team in a 1–0 win over Poland on August 12, 1973. He played club soccer for N.Y. Croatia.
