= Tomislav Crnković =

Tomislav Crnković may refer to:

- Tomislav Crnković (footballer) (1929–2009), Croatian footballer
- Tomislav Crnković (canoeist) (born 1956), Croatian canoeist
- Tomislav Crnković (biathlete) (born 1991), Croatian biathlete
