= Marasović =

Marasović is a surname. Notable people with the surname include:

- Nevio Marasović (born 1983), Croatian film director, screenwriter, and commercial director
- Željko Marasović (1951–2021), Croatian American pianist, organist, and composer
