= Kurtović =

Kurtović or Kurtovic is a surname found in Croatia and Bosnia and Herzegovina. People with the name include:

- Amanda Kurtović (born 1991), Norwegian handball player of Croatian descent
- Elvis J. Kurtović (born 1962), Bosnian rock and roll musician
- Esad Kurtović (born 1965), Bosnian medievalist
- Hrvoje Kurtović (born 1983), Croatian footballer
- Ivan Kurtović (born 1968), retired Croatian footballer
- Jovo Kurtović (1718–1809), Serbian merchant
- Mirza Kurtović (born 1977), former Macedonian basketball player
- William Kurtović (born 1996), Swedish footballer
