= Gavran, Azerbaijan =

Gavran
- Municipality
- Location within Azerbaijan
- Coordinates: 38°53′43″N 48°13′02″E
- Country: Azerbaijan
- Rayon: Yardymli

Population
  - Total: 584
- Time zone: UTC+4 (AZT)
  - Summer (DST): UTC+5 (AZT)

Gavran (also, Gyarvan and Gyavran) is a village and municipality in the Yardymli Rayon of Azerbaijan. It has a population of 584.
