= Orešković =

Orešković, Oreskovic or Oreskovich is a Croatian surname.

It is the third most common surname in the Lika-Senj County of Croatia.

It may refer to:

- Alesha Oreskovich, American model
- Božidar Orešković, Croatian actor
- Dalija Orešković, Croatian lawyer and politician
- Dejan Orešković, Croatian musician
- Marko Orešković, Croatian partisan commander
- Phil Oreskovic, Canadian ice hockey player of Croatian descent
- Stjepan Orešković, Croatian academic and businessman
- Tihomir Orešković, Croatian businessman and politician
- Tihomir Orešković (officer), Croatian army officer and war criminal
- Victor Oreskovich, Canadian ice hockey player of Croatian descent
