= Ljubičić =

Ljubičić (Serbian Cyrillic: Љубичић, pronounced [ʎûbitʃitɕ]) is a South Slavic family name that may refer to the following notable people:

- Dejan Ljubičić (born 1997), Croatian-Austrian footballer
- Dragoljub Ljubičić (born 1962), Serbian actor and humorist
- Ivan Ljubičić (born 1979), Croatian tennis player
- Krešo Ljubičić (born 1988), Croatian footballer
- Marin Ljubičić (born 1988), Croatian footballer
- Marin Ljubičić (born 2002), Croatian footballer
- Marko Ljubičić (born 1987), Serbian basketball player
- Neven Ljubičić (born 1963), Croatian physician and former health minister from 2005 to 2008
- Nikola Ljubičić (1916–2005), Serbian communist politician and general of the Yugoslav People's Army
- Robert Ljubičić (born 1999), Croatian-Austrian footballer
