= Leskovar =

Leskovar is a Slovene and Croatian surname. Notable people with the surname include:

- Janko Leskovar (1861–1949), Croatian novelist
- Mitja Leskovar (born 1970), Slovene apostolic nuncio of the Catholic Church
- Monika Leskovar (born 1981), Croatian German cellist
