= Rebić =

Rebić (Serbian Cyrillic: Ребић) is a Croatian and Serbian surname. Notable people with the surname include:

- Ante Rebić (born 1993), Croatian professional footballer
- Nikola Rebić (born 1995), Serbian professional basketballer

== See also ==
- Ribić
