= Vukušić =

Vukušić is a surname. Notable people with the surname include:

- Ante Vukušić (born 1991), Croatian footballer
- Dubravka Vukušić (born 1965), Croatian speed skater
- Jozef Vukušič (born 1964), Slovak footballer
- Tonko Vukušić (1934–2011), Croatian footballer
