= Cindrić =

Cindrić is a Croatian surname. It is the most common surname in the Karlovac County.

It may refer to:

- Ann Cindric (1922–2010), Croatian-American baseball player
- Austin Cindric (born 1998), American race car driver
- Luka Cindrić (born 1993), Croatian handball player
- Slavin Cindrić (1901–1942), Romanian-born Croatian footballer who played for Yugoslavia
- Tim Cindric (born 1968), American race car driver
