= Vrdoljak =

South Slavic family name commonly found in Croatia

Vrdoljak is a South Slavic family name commonly found in Croatia. Notable people with the name include:

- Antun Vrdoljak (born 1931), Croatian film director and actor
- Dražen Vrdoljak (1951–2008), Croatian music critic and journalist
- Ivan Vrdoljak (born 1972), Croatian politician and entrepreneur
- Ivana Vrdoljak (born 1970), née Ranilović, also known by her stage name Vanna, Croatian pop singer
- Ivica Vrdoljak (born 1983), Croatian footballer
- Mario Vrdoljak (born 1993), Croatian footballer
- Nicholas Vrdoljak (born 1996), Croatian figure skater
- Stipe Vrdoljak (born 1993), Croatian footballer
- Vjekoslav Vrdoljak (born 1954), Croatian cinematographer
- Zdeslav Vrdoljak (born 1971), Croatian water polo player
