= Kardum =

Kardum is a Croatian surname. Notable people with the surname include:

- Ivan Kardum (born 1987), Croatian footballer
- Maria Kardum (born 1968), Swedish swimmer
- Teo Kardum (born 1986), Croatian footballer
