= Lulić =

Lulić (Serbo-Croatian pronunciation: [lǔːlitɕ]) is a Bosnian and Croatian surname. Notable people with the surname include:

- Karlo Lulić (born 1996), Croatian football midfielder
- Mirko Lulić (born 1962), Croatian football defender
- Senad Lulić (born 1986), Bosnian football midfielder
