= Soldo (surname) =

Soldo is a surname found in Italy, Croatia and Serbia.

It is among the most common surnames in the Požega-Slavonia County of Croatia.

It may refer to the following people:

- Carlo Soldo (born 1942), Italian football manager and former player
- Eleonora Soldo (born 1984), Italian racing cyclist
- Ivan Soldo (born 1996), Australian rules footballer of Croatian descent
- Nikola Soldo (born 2001), Croatian football defender
- Vinko Soldo (born 1998), Croatian football player
- Žarko Soldo (1953–2011), Serbian football manager and player
- Zvonimir Soldo (born 1967), Croatian football player and manager
