= Miodrag Grbić =

Serbian archaeologist (1901–1969)

Miodrag Grbić (25 December 1901 – 30 June 1969 in Belgrade) was a Serbian archeologist and custos. He studied in Prague, where he gained a Ph.D. in archeology. He published the Archaeologia Iugoslavica journal together with Nikola Vulić.

Most of his works are about the Neolithic in the Balkans. Grbić discovered Starčevo culture as the oldest local Neolithic culture. He was also the first to conduct research in Pločnik archeological site near Prokuplje.
