= Lončarić =

Lončarić is a Croatian surname. The surname may refer to:

- Filip Lončarić (1986–), Croatian professional football goalkeeper
- Marija Planić-Lončarić (1933–1992), Croatian art historian
- Mijo Lončarić (1941–), Croatian linguist
- Sandra Lončarić (1974–), Croatian actress
- Zvonimir Lončarić (1927–2004), Croatian sculptor and painter.
- Nenad Lončarić (1972–), Croatian rally driver.
