= Zajec =

Zajec is a surname found in Croatia and Slovenia. Notable people with the surname include:

- Ivan Zajec (1869–1952), Slovenian sculptor
- Velimir Zajec (born 1956), Croatian footballer
- Kyle Zajec (born 1997), American soccer player
