= Škorić =

Škorić (Serbian: Шкорић) is a surname. Notable people with the surname include:

- Dalibor Škorić (born 1971), Serbian footballer
- Edin Škorić (born 1975), Serbian volleyball player
- Irena Škorić (born 1981), Croatian film director and screenwriter
- Josip Škorić (born 1981), Croatian footballer
- Maja Škorić (born 1989), Serbian basketball player
- Mile Škorić (born 1991), Croatian footballer
- Mira Škorić (born 1970), Serbian singer
- Ognjen Škorić (born 1993), Bosnia and Herzegovina footballer
- Pero Škorić (born 1969), Serbian footballer
- Sonja Škorić (born 1996), Serbian singer-songwriter
- Zlatko Škorić (1941–2019), Croatian footballer
