= Kornelija Sertić =

Croatian physician

- Born: 1897; Sveti Ivan Zelina
- Died: 1988; Zagreb, Croatia
- Education: University of Zagreb
- Occupation: Physician
- Known for: First female graduate of the School of Medicine
- Medical career
- Field: Pediatrics; Pulmonology
- Sub-specialties: Tuberculosis

Kornelija Sertić (1897 – 1988) was a Croatian tuberculosis researcher and a pioneer for women in medicine.

== Early life ==
Sertić was born in the Croatian town of Sveti Ivan Zelina (at that time a part of Austro-Hungarian Monarchy).

She was the first woman to graduate from the School of Medicine in Zagreb, in 1923. The school opened in 1917.

In addition to her studies in Zagreb, she also studied at the Medical Faculty in Graz, Austria. When she graduated in Zagreb on 30 November 1923, she was the first woman to do so.

=== Career ===
Sertić specialized in pediatrics and became a specialist in tuberculosis and lung diseases. From 1924 to 1928, she worked at the Epidemiological Institute for Dr. Berislav Borčićand and from there went to a children's dispensary in Zagreb as a pediatrician. By winning a scholarship from the Rockefeller Foundation she was able to work at the Paris Clinic for Prevention of Children's Tuberculosis.

Beginning in 1928, she served as a specialist in lung diseases (especially tuberculosis) at a state hospital as well as at a dispensary in Zagreb. She also worked in the Zagreb school polyclinic as deputy chief. From 1930 to 1943, she organized the National Health Center in Sušak and health centers in the Croatian Littoral.

During World War II she was imprisoned for some time by the Gestapo but was released after intervention by a general, which allowed her to support her family as a physician for members of the Croatian Chamber of Crafts. She also saw private patients in her office at 17 Hatzova Street where she administered pneumothorax to patients with tuberculosis. She treated some patients for free. After the war's end, Sertić became director of the Trešnjevka Health Center in Zagreb.

In 1948, she travelled to Copenhagen, Denmark on scholarship to study vaccinations and tuberculosis control. She received many awards for her work and was named president of the TB section of the Croatian Red Cross.

=== Personal life ===
In 1932, Sertić married her colleague, pulmonologist and tuberculosis specialist, Stanko Ibler. She died in 1988 in Zagreb.
