= Rožić =

Surname

Rožić is a surname. Notable people with the surname include:

- Ante Rožić (born 1986), Australian-born Croatian footballer
- Miroslav Rožić (born 1956), Croatian right-wing politician
- Nily Rozic (born 1986), American politician
- Vatroslav Rožić (1857–1937), Croatian linguist and ethnographer
- Vedran Rožić (born 1954), former Croatian football player
- Vesna Rožič (1987–2013), former Slovenian chess player

== See also ==
- Rožič Vrh, a settlement in the hills west of Črnomelj in the White Carniola area of Slovenia
- Rozić
