= Marinić =

Origin
- Language: Serbo-Croatian
- Meaning: son of Marin
- Region of origin: Western Balkans

Other names
- Variant form: Marinović

Marinić is a surname found in Croatia, a patronymic derived from the given name Marin. Notable people with the name include:

- Jagoda Marinić (born 1977), German-Croatian journalist and author
- Jerko Marinić Kragić (born 1991), Croatian water polo player
- Matija Marinić (born 1990), Croatian slalom canoeist

== See also ==
- Marinović
