= Jeličić =

Jeličić (Serbian Cyrillic: Јеличић) is a surname. Notable people with the surname include:

- Dragoljub Jeličić (c.1902–1963), Serbian soldier
- Joško Jeličić (born 1971), Croatian association football midfielder
- Mirko Jeličić (born 1965), Australian association football coach
- Žarko Jeličić (born 1983), Serbian football player

== See also ==
- Jelicich
