= Magdić =

Magdić is a surname. Notable people with the surname include:

- Josip Magdić (born 1985), Croatian footballer
- Marin Magdić (born 1999), Croatian footballer
