= Antolić =

Antolić, sometimes spelled Antolic, is a Croatian surname. Notable people with the surname include:

- Domagoj Antolić (born 1990), Croatian footballer
- Čedo Antolić (1951–2019), Croatian poet and songwriter

== See also ==
- Antolin (name)
