= Zovko =

Zovko is a Croatian surname. Notable people with the surname include:

- Ivan Zovko (born 1988), Croatian tennis player
- Josip Zovko (1970–2019), Croatian actor
- Lovro Zovko (born 1981), Croatian tennis player
- Marijan Zovko (born 1959), Croatian footballer
- Zdravko Zovko (born 1955), Croatian handball player
