= Butorac =

Butorac is a surname. Notable people with the surname include:

- Anka Butorac (1906–1942), Croatian communist
- Claire Butorac (born 1999), American ice hockey player
- Dino Butorac (born 1990), Croatian basketballer
- Eric Butorac (born 1981), American tennis player
- Milan Butorac (born 1952), Croatian rower
- Paul Butorac (born 1983), American basketballer
