= Rendulić =

Rendulić is a Croatian surname. The surname may refer to:

- Borna Rendulić (born 1992), Croatian ice hockey player
- Krunoslav Rendulić (born 1973), Croatian football manager
- Lothar Rendulic (1887–1971), German general
- Zoran Rendulić (born 1984), Serbian football player
