= Majstorović =

Majstorović (Serbian Cyrillic: Мајсторовић) is a Bosnian, Croatian and Serbian surname. The surname was derived from the Old French word 'maistre', a superior, a teacher. The name was originally rendered in the Latin form MAGISTER. In early instances this name was often borne by people who were franklins or other substantial freeholders, presumably because they had labourers under them to work their lands, and unlike smaller free tenants did not just till their property themselves. Members of the Croatian branch have been elevated to Croatian nobility.

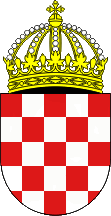
Figure 1. Croatian Nobility

It may refer to:

- Ante Majstorović (born 1993), Croatian footballer
- Biljana Majstorović (born 1959), Serbian basketball player
- Borka Majstorović (born 1983), Serbian tennis player
- Daniel Majstorović (born 1977), Swedish footballer of Serb origin
- Darko Majstorović (born 1946), Yugoslav rower
- Dejan Majstorović (born 1988), Serbian basketball player
- Đorđe Majstorović (born 1990), Serbian basketball player
- Ivica Majstorović (born 1981), German footballer of Croatian origin
- Jasna Majstorović (born 1984), Serbian volleyball player
- Mario Majstorović (born 1977), Austrian footballer
- Milan Majstorović (born 1983), Serbian basketball player
- Milica Majstorović (born 1989), Serbian singer
- Neven Majstorović (born 1989), Serbian volleyball player
- Petar Majstorovic (born 1975), Swiss kickboxer of Croatian origin
- Srđan Majstorović (born 1972), Serbian political scientist
- Tomislav Filipović-Majstorović (1915–1946), Bosnian Croat Franciscan friar, Ustashe military chaplain and war criminal
