= Vuletić =

Vuletić (Cyrillic script: Вулетић) is a South Slavic surname. Notable people with the surname include:

- Bojan Vuletić (born 1971), Serbian musician and composer
- Božo Vuletić (born 1958), Yugoslav water polo player
- Srđan Vuletić (born 1971), Bosnian film director
- Vid Vuletić Vukasović (1853–1933), writer and ethnographer from Dubrovnik
- Vukan Vuletić (born 1973), Serbian diver
- Daniel Vuletic (born 1973), Italian composer
- Zoran Vuletić (politician) (born 1970), Serbian politician
- Zoran Vuletić (musician) (born 1960), Croatian keyboardist, of the band Haustor
