= Lončarević =

Lončarević is a Croatian, Montenegrin and Serbian surname.

Notable people with the name include:

- Dženan Lončarević (born 1975), Serbian pop singer
- Ilija Lončarević (born 1944), Croatian football coach
