= Tomas (surname) =

Tomas is a French and a Croatian surname.

It may refer to:

- Julien Tomas (born 1985), French rugby union footballer
- Marko Tomas (born 1985), Croatian basketball player
- Stjepan Tomas (born 1976), Bosnian-born Croatian football player
- Xavier Tomas (born 1986), French football player
