= Tomašić =

Tomašić (pronounced [tɔ̌maʃitɕ]) is a Croatian surname. Notable people with the name include:

- Andy Tomasic (1917–2008), American football and baseball player
- Dinko Tomašić (1902–1975), Croatian sociologist
- Franjo Tomašić (1761–1831), Croatian nobleman and field marshal
- Igor Tomašić (born 1976), Croatian-Bulgarian footballer
- Luca Tomašić (born 1983), Italian footballer
- Ljudevit Tomašić (1901–1945), Croatian politician
- Marijan Tomašić (born 1986), Croatian footballer
- Nikola Tomašić (1864–1918), Croatian politician
- Ruža Tomašić (born 1958), Croatian politician
