= Kramarić =

Kramarić (Serbo-Croatian pronunciation: [krǎmaritɕ]) is a Croatian surname and Kramarič is a Croatian and Slovene one. Notable people with the surname include:

- Andrej Kramarić (born 1991), Croatian footballer
- Mirko Kramarić (born 1989), Croatian footballer
- Martin Kramarič (born 1997), Slovenian footballer
- Zlatko Kramarić (born 1956), Croatian politician
