= Čuljak =

Čuljak is a Croatian surname.

Notable people with the name include:

- Dijana Čuljak (born 1968), Croatian television host
- Ivica Čuljak (1960–1992), Croatian musician best known as Satan Panonski
- Krešimir Čuljak (born 1970), Croatian rower
- Tomislav Čuljak (born 1987), Croatian football player
