= Pranjić =

Pranjić is a surname. People with the surname include:

- Danijel Pranjić, a Croatian football manager and former player
- Davor Pranjić, a Bosnian Croat politician
- Antonijo Pranjić, a Slovenian footballer
- Jurica Pranjić, a Croatian footballer

== See also ==
- Oliver Pranjic
