= Vojinovac =

- Village
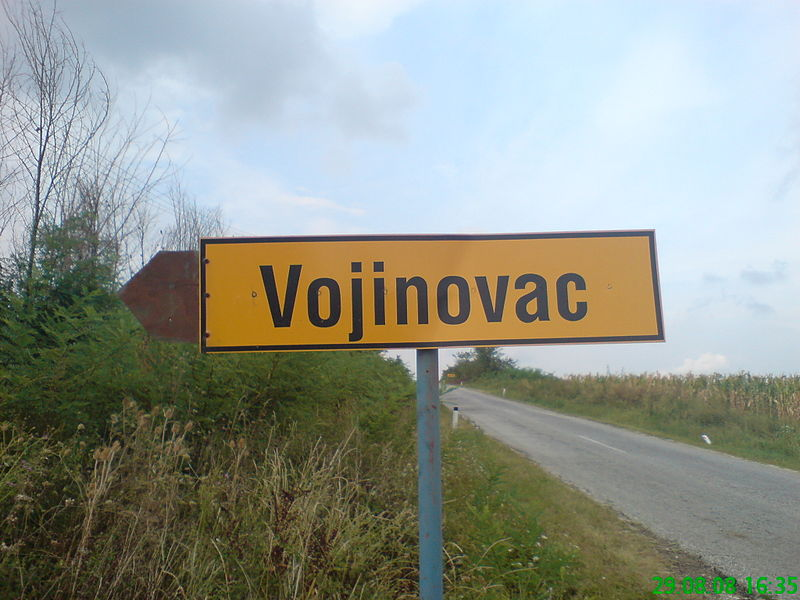
- Signboard of the town Vojinovac

- Location within Serbia
- Coordinates: 44°07′43″N 20°54′29″E
- Country: Serbia
- District: Šumadija District
- Municipality: Rača

Population (2002)
  - Total: 132
- Time zone: UTC+1 (CET)
  - Summer (DST): UTC+2 (CEST)

Vojinovac is a village in the municipality of Rača, Serbia. According to the 2002 census, the village has a population of 132 people.
