= Mlinarić =

Mlinarić is a surname. Notable people with the surname include:

- Mlinarić family, medieval Croatian noble family
- Anton Mlinaric, Australian professional soccer player
- David Mlinaric, British interior decorator of Slovenian descent
- Marko Mlinarić, Croatian football player
- Petar Mlinarić, Croatian politician
