= Bačić =

Bačić is a surname found in Croatia and Serbia. It may refer to:

- Branko Bačić (born 1959), Croatian politician
- Doris Bačić (born 1995), Croatian football player
- Lazar Bačić (1865–1941), Croatian Serb merchant and philanthropist
- Lidija Bačić (born 1985), Croatian singer
- Slaven Bačić (born 1965), Serbian Croat jurist
- Steve Bacic (born 1965), Canadian actor of Croatian origin
