= Matošević =

Matošević (Croatian pronunciation: [matǒːʃeʋitɕ]) is a gender-neutral Croatian surname. Notable people with the surname include:

- Ivan Matošević (born 1989), Croatian football player
- Marinko Matosevic (born 1985), Australian tennis player
- Matea Matošević (born 1989), Croatian long-distance runner
- Valter Matošević (born 1970), Croatian handball player
- Vedran Matošević (born 1990), Croatian futsal player
