= Puškarić =

Puškarić is a Croatian surname.

It is the third most common surname in the Karlovac County of Croatia.

It may refer to:

- Darko Puškarić (born 1985), Serbian football player
- Mike Puskaric (born 1989), American politician

== See also ==
- Puškarići
