= Tonković =

Tonković may refer to:

- Marija Tonković, Yugoslav basketball player
- Stanko Tonković, Croatian scholar, of the Faculty of Electrical Engineering and Computing, University of Zagreb
- Bela Tonković, Serbian-Croatian politician, of the Democratic Alliance of Croats in Vojvodina

== See also ==
- Tonkovich
