= Zrilić =

Zrilić is a surname found in Croatia.

It is the third most common surname in the Zadar County of Croatia.

It may refer to:

- Iva Zrilić, Croatian handball player
- Mladen Zrilić, Serbian volleyball player
- Stipe Zrilić, former Zadar County prefect (2009–2017)
