= Baković =

Baković is a Croatian and Bosnian surname. Notable people with the name include:

- Branko Baković (born 1981), Serbian footballer
- Duje Baković (born 1986), Croatian footballer
- Eric Baković, American linguist
- Luka Baković (born 1997), Croatian para-athlete
- Ivan Baković, Croatian soldier and convicted war criminal
- Marijo Baković (born 1982), Croatian long jumper
- Peter Bakovic (born 1965), Canadian ice hockey player
- Rajka Baković (1920–1941), Croatian student and member of anti-fascist resistance
