= Mihić =

Mihić is a surname. Notable people with the name include:

- Gordan Mihić (1938–2019), Serbian playwright
- Lovro Mihić (born 1994), Croatian handball player
- Miljenko Mihić (1933–2009), Bosnian Serb football coach
- Mirko Mihić (born 1965), Serbian football coach
