= Ravlić =

Ravlić is a Croatian surname. Notable people with the surname include:

- Ljiljana Ravlić (born 1958), Western Australian politician of Croatian origin
- Slaven Ravlić (born 1951), Croatian lexicographer and politologist
