= Jelavić =

Jelavić is a primarily Croatian surname. Notable people with the surname include:

- Anđa Jelavić (born 1980), Croatian women's basketball player
- Ante Jelavić (born 1963), Bosnian Croat politician
- Igor Jelavić (born 1962), Croatian footballer
- Mario Jelavić (born 1993), Croatian footballer
- Matko Jelavić (born 1950), Croatian singer, songwriter, composer and drummer
- Nikica Jelavić (born 1985), Croatian footballer

== In popular culture ==
- Irina Jelavić, a Serbian assassin in Assassination Classroom
