= Antolović =

Antolović is a surname. Notable people with the surname include:

- Josip Antolović (1916–1999), Yugoslav Partisan
- Josip Antolović (1926–2008), Croatian Jesuit writer
- Kamilo Antolović (born 1961), Croatian marketer
- Marinko Antolović (born 1976), Croatian priest and Vatican diplomat
- Marijan Antolović (born 1989), Croatian footballer
- Ana Antolović, fictional soap opera character
