= Sučić =

Sučić is a surname. The Croatian census of 2011 listed it as one of the most common surnames in Lekenik and Ružić, Croatia. Notable people with the surname include:

- Luka Sučić (born 2002), Croatian footballer
- Petar Sučić (born 2003), Croatian footballer

== See also ==
- Steve Sucic
