= Greg Stimac =

American artist (born 1976)

Grga Štimac
- Born: 1976 (age 49–50); Euclid, Ohio, U.S.
- Education: Stanford University, Columbia College Chicago
- Known for: Photography, video, sculpture

Grga Štimac, formally Greg Stimac (born 1976) is an American artist who lives and works in New Mexico. His work is held in the collections of the Museum of Contemporary Photography and Museum of Contemporary Art, Chicago.

== Education and background ==
Grga Štimac was born a first-generation Croatian-American in Euclid, Ohio. His interest in photography matured in Linda, California, while attending Yuba Community College (1997–2002) where he practiced traditional darkroom processes.

In 2002, his work was included in the Crocker-Kingsley: California's Biennial at the Crocker Art Museum, (Sacramento, California) juried by artist Gladys Nilsson.

He relocated to Chicago to finish his undergraduate education at Columbia College Chicago (2003–2005) and found employment at both the Museum of Contemporary Photography and the Croatian Ethnic Institute. From 2011 to 2013 Štimac attended graduate school at Stanford University.

== Artistic practice ==
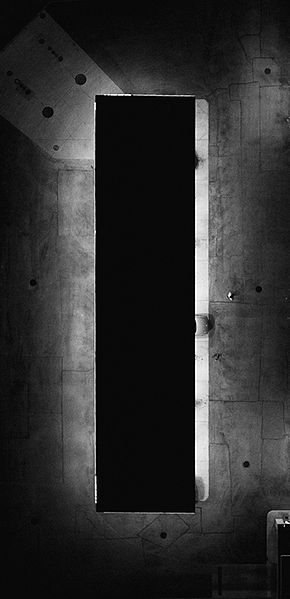
80" x 38.5", 2011, Archival Inkjet Print (Gas Station Photograph I)

Štimac first gained attention for his serial photographic series titled "Recoil" (2005), a project made in collaboration with gun enthusiasts at unregulated shooting ranges in California and Missouri. Other subjects from this period include; lawn mowing, unattended campfires, urine-filled bottles at the roadside, and cars peeling out.

In 2009 Štimac collected ephemera on plexiglass plates attached to the grill of his car between destinations, then scanned them at road-side with a flatbed scanner. This work became a series loosely referred as "Driving Photographs" and served as a departure from his traditional photographic practice. Each individual image is titled with the point and destination.

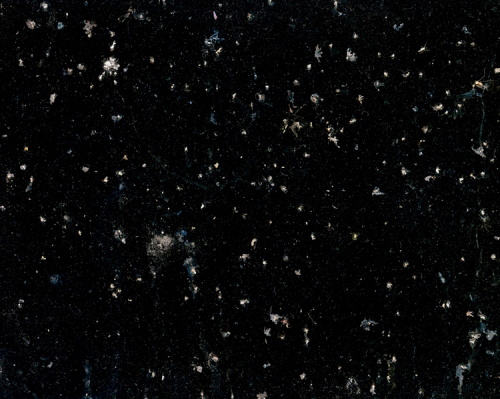
Chicago to Atlanta, 2009, Archival Inkjet Print, 24"x30"

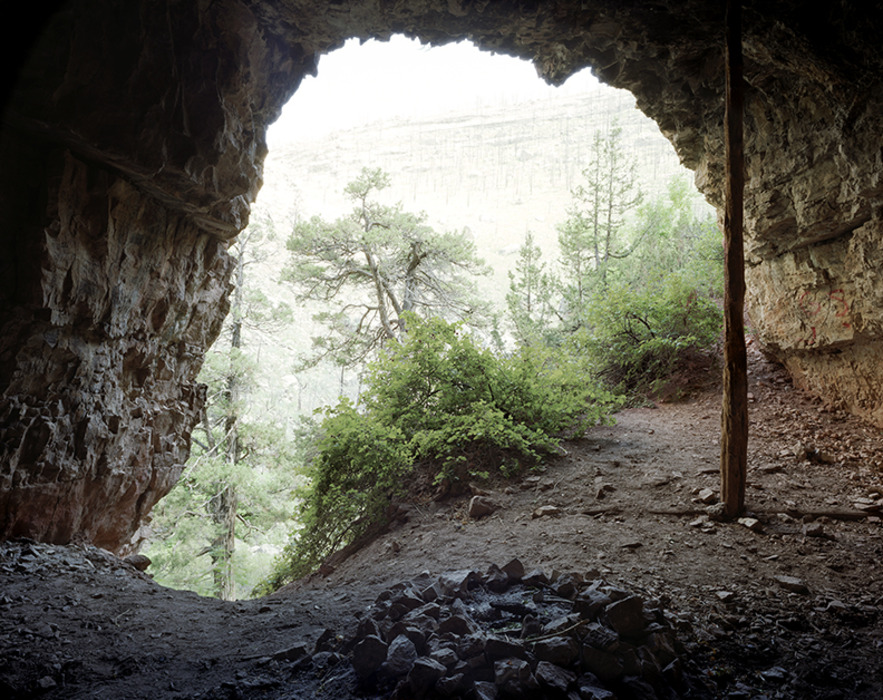
Butch Cassidy and the Sundance Kid, 2009, Archival Inkjet Print, 24"x30"

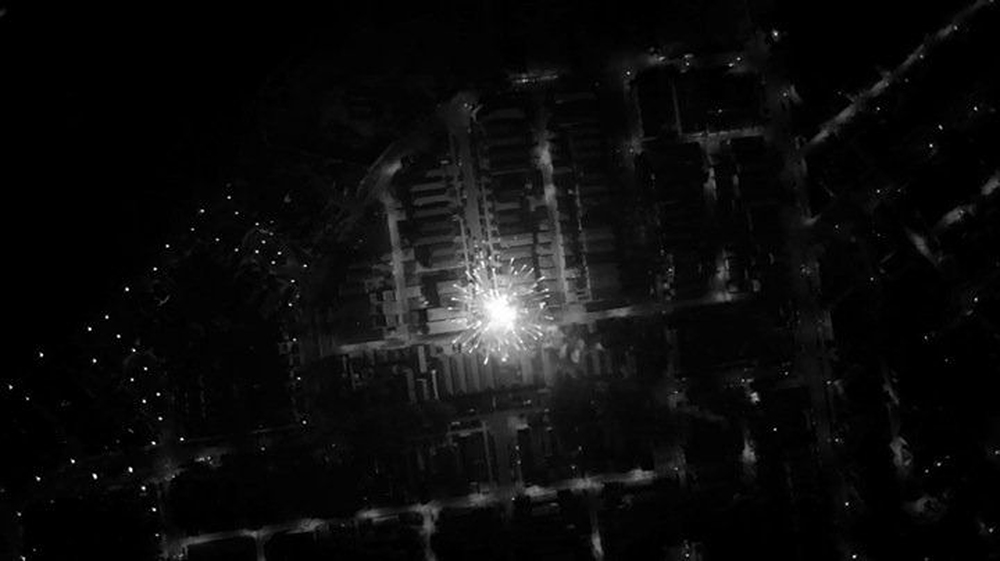
Empire, 2011, Digital Video Loop

In recent work, Štimac continues to investigate myth and reality of American identity through its landscape, cultural traditions, folk heroes, and histories, with subject matter including the Golden Spike, Old Faithful, the Flag of the United States, and America's Independence Day (the 4th of July).

== Exhibitions ==
=== Solo exhibitions ===
- 2007 Self-Titled, Museum of Contemporary Art, 12 X 12, Chicago, Illinois
- 2019 Amulet: Document, Chicago, Illinois
- 2019 Selected Works: Santa Fe Institute, Santa Fe, New Mexico

== Collections ==
- Museum of Contemporary Art, Chicago, Illinois
- Museum of Contemporary Photography, Chicago, Illinois
