= Brekalo =

Brekalo is a Croatian surname. Notable people with the surname include:

- David Brekalo (born 1998), Slovenian footballer
- Filip Brekalo (born 2002), Croatian footballer
- Josip Brekalo (born 1998), Croatian footballer
- Marko Brekalo (born 1992), Croatian footballer
- Mirela Brekalo (born 1956), Croatian actress
