= Žilić =

Žilić (Serbian Cyrillic: Жилић) is a Serbo-Croatian surname. Notable people with the surname include:

- Dragan Žilić (born 1974), Serbian footballer
- Tonči Žilić (born 1975), Croatian footballer
