= Mikić =

Mikić (Serbian Cyrillic: Микић) is a Serbian and Croatian surname. It may be written without diacritics as Mikic or transcribed as Mikich.

== Notable people ==
The surname may refer to:

- Borislav Mikić, Bosnian football player
- Jovan Mikić Spartak, Serbian jumper
- Krešimir Mikić, Croatian actor
- Mihael Mikić, Croatian football player
- Minya Mikic, Italian artist of Serbian descent
- Mirko Mikić, Bosnian handball player
- Nikola Mikić, Serbian football player
- Sonia Seymour Mikich, German journalist

== Etymology ==
The surname is a patronymic.

== Bibliography ==
- Barac-Grum, Vida (1987-06-28). "Pogled na gorskokotarsku povijesnu antroponimiju" [A View into the Historical Anthroponymy of Gorski Kotar]. Rasprave Instituta za hrvatski jezik (in Croatian). 13 (1): 5–8. ISSN 1331-6745.
