= Luka Bekavac =

Croatian writer and translator

Luka Bekavac (born September 25, 1976) is a Croatian writer, university professor, and translator. He was born in the city of Osijek. His novels, Drenje (2011) and Viljevo (2013), have received critical acclaim. Viljevo won the Janko Polić Kamov Award in 2014, and the EU Prize for Literature in 2015. As a translator, Bekavac has translated works by notable authors such as Martin Amis, Jonathan Franzen, Alberto Toscano, Naomi Klein, and Aleksandar Hemon, among others.

Bekavac teaches literature at Zagreb University and regularly contributes to media outlets and scholarly publications.

Bekavac is a member of the electro-acoustic music project Jeanne Frémaux with Toma Bačić.
