= Dario Đaković =

Austrian footballer

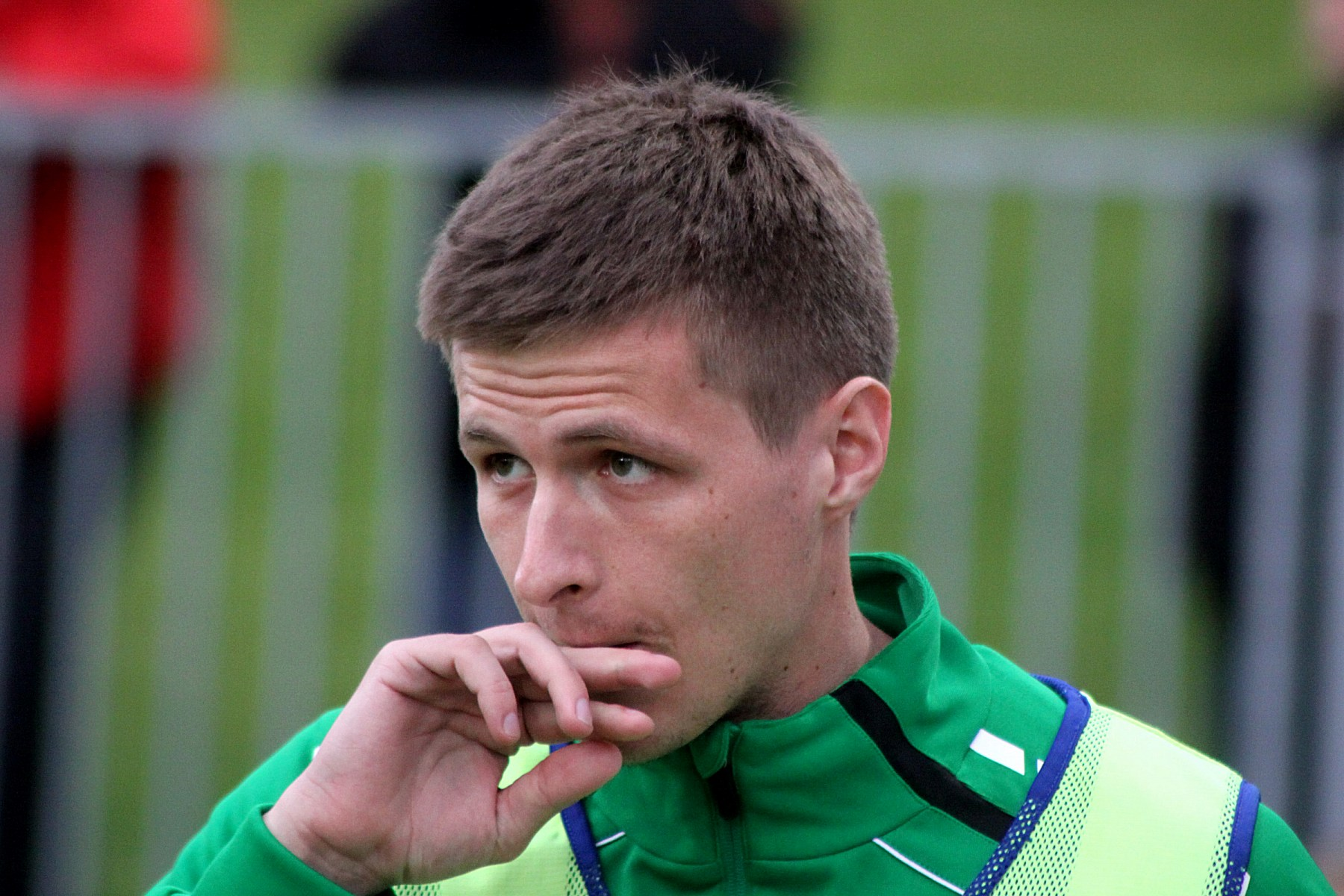

Personal information
- Full name: Dario Đaković
- Date of birth: 20 April 1987 (age 39)
- Place of birth: Austria
- Height: 1.87 m (6 ft 1 1/2 in)
- Position: Defender

Senior career*
Years	Team	Apps	(Gls)
2006–2013	Wacker Innsbruck	84	(2)
2006–2007	→ WSG Wattens (loan)	14	(0)
2008	→ SV Hall (loan)	12	(0)
- * Club domestic league appearances and goals as of 12:28, 21 July 2013 (UTC)

Dario Đaković (born 20 April 1987) is an Austrian footballer.
