= Pavo Dadić =

Bosnian footballer

Personal information
- Full name: Pavo Dadić
- Date of birth: 28 June 1969 (age 57)
- Place of birth: SFR Yugoslavia
- Height: 1.78 m (5 ft 10 in)
- Position: Midfielder

Senior career*
Years	Team	Apps	(Gls)
1995–1997	NK Zenica	46	(10)
1997–1998	Zadarkomerc	8	(0)
1998–2001	Čelik Zenica	80	(8)
2002–2003	Žepče	30	(1)

International career^{‡}
1996-1997	Bosnia and Herzegovina	10	(0)
- * Club domestic league appearances and goals ‡ National team caps and goals as of 12 June 2021

Pavo Dadić (born 28 June 1969) is a Bosnian retired football player. A Croat, he decided to play for Bosnia.

== International career ==
Dadić made his debut for Bosnia and Herzegovina in an April 1996 friendly match against Albania and has earned a total of 10 caps, scoring no goals. His final international was a September 1997 World Cup qualification against Slovenia.
