= Laura Škvorc =

Slovenian model

Personal information
- Date of birth: 7 November 1997 (age 29)
- Position: Defender

International career^{‡}
Years	Team	Apps	(Gls)
- Slovenia
- ‡ National team caps and goals as of 19:50, 30 August 2019 (UTC)

Laura Škvorc (born 7 November 1997) is a Slovenian footballer who plays as a defender and has appeared for the Slovenia women's national team.

== Career ==
Škvorc has been capped for the Slovenia national team, appearing for the team during the 2019 FIFA Women's World Cup qualifying cycle.
