= Marović =

Marović (Cyrillic script: Маровић) is a South Slavic surname. Notable people with the surname include:

- Ana Marija Marović (1815–1887), Italian nun
- Bojan Marović (born 1984), Montenegrin singer and actor
- Dražen Marović (born 1938), Croatian chess player, trainer, journalist, writer and broadcaster
- Marko Marović (born 1983), Serbian footballer
- Slobodan Marović (born 1964), former Montenegrin footballer
- Svetozar Marović (born 1955), Montenegrin politician and lawyer
- Uroš Marović (1946–2014), Serbian water polo player
