= Bešlić =

Bešlić is a surname. Notable people with the surname include:

- Ana Bešlić (1912–2008), Serbian sculptor
- Domagoj Bešlić (born 1990), Croatian footballer
- Halid Bešlić (1953–2025), Bosnian folk singer and musician
- Ljubo Bešlić (1958–2021), Bosnian Croat politician
