= John Baricevic =

American football coach and judge

Coaching career (HC unless noted)
- 1970–1973: Benedictine

Head coaching record
- Overall: 9–20–1

C. John Baricevic is a former judge of the Twentieth Judicial Circuit in the state of Illinois. Prior to his work in law, he was an American football coach at the college level in Kansas.

== Legal career ==
Baricevic presided over the Twentieth Judicial Circuit (Fifth Appellate District) in Illinois for the counties of Monroe, Perry, Randolph, St. Clair, and Washington. He earned his Juris Doctor degree from Southern Illinois University Carbondale in 1978.

== Coaching career ==
Baricevic was the head football coach at Benedictine College in Atchison, Kansas. He held that position for four seasons, from 1970 to 1973. His coaching record at Benedictine was 9–20–1.

Baricevic revived the football program at Benedictine in 1970, where he was later inducted into the school's Athletic Hall of Fame for his work as head coach and his impact on the program.

== Family and politics ==
On June 28, 2016, the Foundation for Accountability and Civic Trust (FACT) filed a complaint while under the directorship of Matthew Whitaker with the Federal Elections Commission. It was later shown that FACT was operating as a "chop shop of fake ethics complaints" targeting perceived partisan political actors.
