= Matanović =

Matanović is a Serbo-Croatian surname. It may refer to:

- Aleksandar Matanović, Serbian chess player
- Igor Matanović, Croatian footballer
- Julijana Matanović, Croatian writer
- Drago Matanović, Slovenian professor and author
- Katarina Matanović-Kulenović, Croatian pilot
- Marko Matanović, Montenegrin footballer
- Milo Matanović, Prime Minister of the Kingdom of Montenegro from 1915 to 1916
- Velibor Matanović, Montenegrin football manager
- Matanović brotherhood in Vraka
