= Hodak =

Hodak is a Croatian surname. Notable people with the surname include:

- Bojan Hodak (born 1971), Croatian footballer and manager
- Domenica Hodak (born 1991), American soccer player
- Jerry Hodak (born 1942), American television meteorologist
