= Rodić =

Rodić (Serbian Cyrillic: Родић, pronounced [rǒːditɕ]) is a Serbo-Croatian surname. Notable people with the surname include:

- Aleksander Rodić (born 1979), Slovenian football player
- Gabriel Rodić (1812–1890), Croatian general in the Austrian Empire
- Ivan Rafael Rodić, Croatian Franciscan priest, Archbishop of Belgrade
- Ivan Rodić, Croatian football player
- Milan Rodić, Serbian football player
- Silvio Rodić, Croatian football player
- Snežana Rodić, Slovenian triple jumper
- Vladimir Rodić, Montenegrin football player
