= Žabica =

Žabica may refer to:

- Žabica, Croatia, a village in Lika-Senj County
- Žabica, Ljubinje, a village in Ljubinje, Bosnia and Herzegovina
