= Rajić (surname) =

Rajić is a South Slavic surname. Notable people with the name include:

- Blaško Rajić (1878–1951), Croatian priest, writer and politician
- Ema Rajić (born 2000), Croatian swimmer
- Ivica Rajić (born 1958), Bosnian Croat army commander
- Jovan Rajić (1726–1801), Serbian writer and historian
- Ljubiša Rajić (1947–2012), Serbian linguist and translator
- Marko Rajić (born 1991), Serbian football player
- Mihael Rajić (born 1984), Croatian football player
- Nenad Rajić (born 1982), Serbian football player
- Predrag Rajić (born 1987), Serbian politician
- Tanasko Rajić (1754–1815), Serbian revolutionary
- Velimir Rajić (1879–1915), Serbian poet
