= Kuzmich =

Kuzmich is a Slavic surname and patronymic.. Notable people with the surname include:

- Feodor Kuzmich (died 1864), Russian Orthodox starets
- Heather Kuzmich (born 1986), American fashion model
- Mikhail Kuzmich (born 1982), Russian luger
- Pavel Kuzmich (born 1988), Russian luger
