= Ivanišević =

Ivanišević (Serbian: Иванишевић) is a Serbian and a Croatian surname. It may refer to:

- Goran Ivanišević (born 1971), tennis player
- Ivan Ivanišević (born 1977), chess player
- Jovo Ivanišević (1861–1889), composer
- Katica Ivanišević (1935–2024), professor and politician
- Miroslav Ivanišević (born 1956), politician
- Tibor Ivanišević (born 1990), handball player
- Jovan Ivanisevic (born 2005), Canadian soccer player
