= Poljak, Sanski Most =

Poljak
- Village
- Location within Bosnia and Herzegovina
- Coordinates: 44.774437°N 16.678787°E
- Country: Bosnia and Herzegovina
- Entity: Federation of Bosnia and Herzegovina
- Canton: Una-Sana
- Municipality: Sanski Most

Area
  - Total: 1.19 sq mi (3.08 km^{2})

Population (2013)
  - Total: 483
  - Density: 406/sq mi (157/km^{2})
- Time zone: UTC+1 (CET)
  - Summer (DST): UTC+2 (CEST)

Poljak is a village in the municipality of Sanski Most, Federation of Bosnia and Herzegovina, Bosnia and Herzegovina.

== Demographics ==
According to the 2013 census, its population was 483.

Ethnicity in 2013
Ethnicity	Number	Percentage
Bosniaks	333	68.9%
Croats	131	27.1%
Serbs	1	0.2%
other/undeclared	18	3.7%
Total	483	100%
