= Devčić =

Devčić is a surname.

It is among the most common surnames in the Lika-Senj County of Croatia.

Notable people with the surname include:

- Duško Devčić (born 1948), Croatian footballer
- Ivan Devčić (born 1948), Croatian Catholic archbishop
- Marina Devčić (born 1946), original name of Marina Dallas, Croatian-New Zealander singer
- Natko Devčić (1914–1997), Croatian composer
