= Tomac =

Tomac is a surname. Notable people with this surname include:

- Eli Tomac (born 1992), American motocross racer
- Eugen Tomac (born 1981), Romanian politician
- John Tomac (born 1967), American cyclist
- Marta Tomac (born 1990), Norwegian-Croatian handball player
- Mewen Tomac (born 2001), French swimmer
- Steve Tomac (born 1953), American politician
- Zdravko Tomac (1937–2020), Croatian politician
- Željko Tomac (born 1956), Croatian handball player
