= Luketić =

Luketić or Luketic is a surname of Croatian or Serbian origin. Notable people with the surname include:

- Katarina Luketić (born 1998), Croatian volleyball player
- Robert Luketic (born 1973), Australian film director
