= Zubčić =

Zubčić (Croatian pronunciation: [zǔptʃitɕ]) is a Croatian surname.

It is among the most common surnames in the Zadar County of Croatia.

Notable people with the surname include:

- Filip Zubčić (born 1993), Croatian skier
- Martina Zubčić (born 1989), Croatian athlete
- Tomislav Zubčić (born 1990), Croatian basketball player
