= Milinković =

Milinković (Serbian Cyrillic: Милинковић, pronounced [milǐːŋkoʋitɕ]) is a surname derived from a masculine given name Milinko. It may refer to:

- David Milinković (born 1994), Serbian-French footballer
- Duško Milinković (born 1960), Serbian footballer
- Marcos Milinkovic (born 1971), Argentine volleyball player
- Marko Milinković (born 1988), Serbian footballer
- Milorad Milinković (1965–2025), Serbian film director and screenwriter
- Mladen Milinković (born 1968), Serbian football manager and former player
- Nikola Milinković (born 1968), Yugoslav/Bosnian footballer
- Sergej Milinković-Savić (born 1995), Serbian footballer
- Vanja Milinković-Savić (born 1997), Serbian footballer
- Zoran Milinković (born 1956), presidential candidate of the Patriots of the Serbian Diaspora in the Serbian presidential election, 2004
- Zoran Milinković (footballer) (born 1968), Serbian football manager and former player
