= Batinić =

Batinić is a surname found in Croatia. Notable people with this surname include:

- Branka Batinić (born 1958), Croatian table tennis player
- Boris Batinić (born 1981), Croatian handball player
