= Lukačević =

Lukačević (Serbian Cyrillic: Лукачевић) is a Serbian and Croatian surname, a patronymic derived from Lukač.

The slava (Orthodox patron saint veneration) of Lukačević families is Alypius the Stylite. In Podgorica, bearers of the surname are mainly Orthodox, while other are Muslims. These are all related to the Lukačević families in Berislavci and Vranje.

== Notable people ==
- Ivan Lukačević (footballer) (1946–2003), Yugoslav footballer
- Ivan Lukačević (soldier)
- Josip Lukačević (1983–2025), Bosnian footballer
- Stevan Lukačević (1860–1932), Montenegrin politician
- Vojislav Lukačević (1908–1945), Chetnik
