= Krznarić =

Krznarić is a South Slavic patronymic surname literally meaning "son of krznar", i.e. "son of a furrier". Notable people with the surname incliude:

- Davor Krznarić, Croatian footballer
- Josip Krznarić, Croatian footballer
- Roman Krznaric, Australian-born social philosopher
