= Banič =

Banič, Banić is a surname. Notable people with the surname include:

- Marko Banić (born 1984), Croatian basketball player
- Štefan Banič (1870–1941), Slovak inventor
- Stanko Banić (1886-1932), Croatian and Yugoslav priest
- Stanko Banić (1917-2004), Priest and poet
- Ivan Banić (born 1994), Croatian professional footballer

== See also ==
- 25864 Banič, a main-belt asteroid
