= Vidić =

Vidić (Serbian Cyrillic: Видић, pronounced [ʋǐːditɕ]) is a South Slavic surname, and may refer to:

- Aleksa Vidić (born 1994), footballer
- Dejan Vidić (born 1993), Serbian footballer
- Nebojša Vidić (born 1973), Serbian basketball player and coach
- Nemanja Vidić (born 1981), retired Serbian footballer
- Nemanja Vidić (born 1989), Serbian footballer
- Velimir Vidić (born 1979), Bosnian footballer
