= Salopek =

Salopek is a Croatian surname.

It is the second most common surname in the Karlovac County of Croatia.

Notable people with the surname include:

- Emanuela Salopek (born 1987), Croatian basketball player
- Paul Salopek (born 1962), American journalist and writer
- Steven Salopek (born 1985), Croatian Australian rules footballer

== See also ==
- Salopek Selo
