= Meštrović =

Meštrović or Mestrovic (also Mestrovich, Meshtrovich) is a Croatian surname. Notable people with the surname include:

- Carolina Mestrovic (born 1991), Chilean singer, actress and television presenter
- Ivan Meštrović (1883–1962), Croatian sculptor
- Ivan Meštrović (sportsman) (born 1979), Croatian entrepreneur and sportsman
- James I. Mestrovitch (1894–1918), Montenegrin-American soldier, recipient of the Medal of Honor
- Mate Meštrović (1930–2025), Croatian-American journalist and academic
- Stelvio Mestrovich (born 1948), Italian-Croatian writer, musicologist
- Stjepan Meštrović (born 1955), Croatian-American sociologist
