= Rukavina =

Rukavina is a South Slavic surname, derived from the Croatian word rukav, meaning "sleeve."

It is the most common surname in Lika-Senj County in Croatia. The surname originates from the Rukavina noble family, which settled in the region in the 17th century.

Notable people with the name include:

- Ante Rukavina (born 1986), Croatian footballer
- Antonio Rukavina (born 1984), Serbian footballer
- Ivan Rukavina (1912–1992), Croatian soldier and politician active in Yugoslavia
- Jerko Rukavina (1796–1879), Croatian soldier
- Josip Rukavina (born 1942), Croatian chess player
- Juraj Rukavina Vidovgradski (soldier) (1777–1849), soldier and politician, grandfather of Juraj Rukavina born in 1834
- Juraj Rukavina Vidovgradski (politician) (1834–1915), Croatian politician, grandson of Juraj Rukavina born in 1777
- Juraj Rukavina (Ustaše Militia) (1898–1945), colonel in the Ustaše Militia during World War II, commander of the Jadovno concentration camp
- Mathias Rukavina von Boynograd (1737–1817), Austrian general during the French Revolutionary Wars
- Tom Rukavina (1950–2019), American politician
- Tomislav Rukavina (born 1974), Croatian footballer
- Ana Rukavina (born 1991), Croatian economist, financial regulatory professional and writer
