= Tokić =

Tokić (Serbian Cyrillic: Токич) is a surname found in Bosnia and Herzegovina and Croatia. People with the name include:

- Bojan Tokić (born 1981), Slovenian table tennis player
- Hrvoje Tokić (born 1990), Croatian football forward
- Mario Tokić (born 1975), former Croatian footballer
- Niko Tokić (born 1988), Croatian professional footballer
- Tin Tokić (born 1985), Italian-Croatian handballer
