= Komljenović =

Komljenović is a Serbian and Croatian surname. It may refer to:

- Dejan Komljenović, Slovenian footballer
- Fabijan Komljenović, retired Croatian footballer
- Ivo Komljenović, Bosnian politician
- Jelena Komljenović, Serbian writer
- Marko Komljenović, Austro-Hungarian Serb oberlieutnant
- Slobodan Komljenović, retired Serbian footballer

== See also ==
- Komlenović, surname
- Komnenović, surname
