= Franjić =

Franjić is a surname. Notable people with the surname include:

- Mario Franjić (born 1962), Bosnian bobsledder
- Ivan Franjic (born 1987), Australian soccer player
- Petar Franjić (born 1991), Croatian footballer
- Petar Franjic (born 1992), Australian soccer player
- Ivan Franjić (born 1997), German-Croatian footballer
- Bartol Franjić (born 2000), Croatian footballer
