= Nakić =

Nakić is a Croatian surname. It may refer to:

- Danira Bilić (née Danira Nakić), Croatian basketball player and politician
- Franko Nakić (born 1972), Croatian-Greek basketball player
- Mihovil Nakić (born 1955), Croatian basketball player and sports director
