= Goodbye Elliott =

American rock band

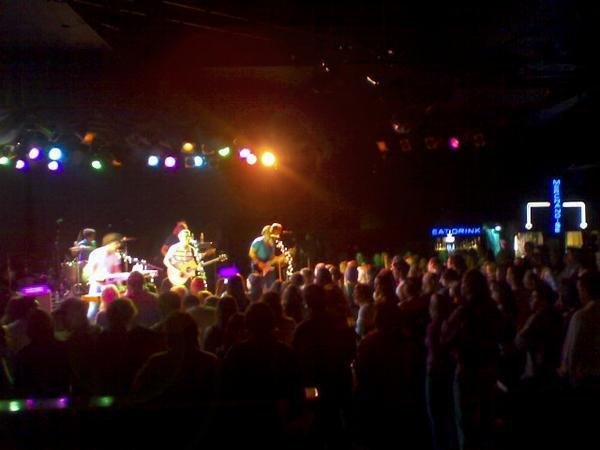
- Goodbye Elliott performing live at The Roxy in Hollywood, on October 27th, 2010.

Background information
- Origin: Kailua-Kona, Hawaii, United States
- Genres: Rock
- Years active: 2005–present
- Labels: Goodbye Elliott Records; Big Island Studios; West Side Pacific Studios
- Members: Jonny Stimac; Chris Stimac; Paul Gubser; Ryan Johnston; Jordan Smallwood

Goodbye Elliott is an American rock band from the Hawaiian Islands. The band is composed of lead vocalist/guitarist Jonny Stimac, his brother vocalist/guitarist/ukulele Chris Stimac, vocalist/bassist Paul Gubser, vocalist/keys/ukulele Ryan Johnston, and vocalist/drummer Jordan Smallwood Since the band's formation in 2005 they have released three studio albums.

== Formation ==
Goodbye Elliott was formed in Kailua-Kona, Hawaii, in early 2005. All of the members are born and raised on The Big Island of Hawaii. Singer/guitarist brothers Jonny Stimac and Chris Stimac grew up with bassist Paul Gubser in Kona. In high-school the three of them formed together the band "Not Mother?" and released one full-length album under that name. They later created "Goodbye Elliott" after adding high-school friends keyboardist Ryan Johnston and drummer Jordan Smallwood.

== Albums and recording ==
In 2006, after two sold out mainland tours and after gathering a large hometown following on the Big Island, Goodbye Elliott traveled to the Netherlands to record the band's first full-length album. On New Year's Eve of 2007 they released the album Running to California. After extensive touring, Goodbye Elliott joined in the studio with producer Al Clay (The Pixies, Pink, Pirates of the Caribbean, Batman Begins). In summer of 2008 Goodbye Elliott released E.P. Simple Summer Love.

The band released their third album E.P. "Summer" in the Summer of 2010. It features production from Al Clay, Danny Stimac, and Jonny. A music video was shot for the single "Don't Call Me Baby".

== Commercial and critical acclaim ==
Goodbye Elliott's 2007 album release "Running to California" appeared at 25 on the US Modern Rock Charts and independently sold more than 40,000 copies. Along with appearing Live on Sirius XM Radio's 'Andy Dick Show,' Goodbye Elliott and their album "Running to California" was featured across radio stations worldwide.

In July 2012 Goodbye Elliott's music was featured on the ABC Family show Jane by Design, their new music also appeared on MTV, the E! series Married to Jonas, and in 2013 they were featured on the debut episode of the Fox comedy The Goodwin Games.

Goodbye Elliott had two of their songs included in the 2015 Canadian romantic comedy film A Date with Miss Fortune. One of the songs, "Almost Had It All", was specifically written for the film by Daniel Stimac, brother of the band's singer/guitarists. Jonny Stimac directed and appeared in the music video for the song. In January 2017, the song was nominated for the Canadian Screen Award for Best Original Song.

== Members ==
- Jonny Stimac - Lead Vocals, Guitar
- Chris Stimac - Guitar, Ukulele, Backing vocals
- Paul Gubser - Bass, Backing vocals
- Ryan Johnston - Keys, Ukulele, Backing vocals
- Jordan Smallwood - Drums, Backing vocals

== Discography ==
=== Albums ===
- Goodnight to You and Not to Me - E.P. - 2005 I Wanna Say Mason Inc.
- Running to California - 2006 Goodbye Elliott Records
- Simple Summer Love - E.P. - 2008 Big Island Studios
- Summer - E.P. - 2010 Big Island Studios
- I'll Never Let You Go - (UNRELEASED) Big Island Studios

=== Singles ===
- "Divinci's Theme" (2005)
- "Ticket to Love" (2006)
- "Don't Call Me Baby" (2010)
- "Sunshine Girl" (2010)
