= Mamić =

Mamić is a surname. It may refer to:

- Bojan Mamić (born 1981), Serbian footballer
- Drago Mamić (born 1954), football manager
- Josipa Mamić (born 1994), handball player
- Marko Mamić (born 1994), handball player
- Matej Mamić (born 1975), basketball player
- Petar Mamić (born 1996), footballer
- Sanda Mamić (born 1985), Croatian tennis player
- Zdravko Mamić (born 1959), Croatian football manager
- Zoran Mamić (born 1971), Croatian footballer
