= Damir Burić =

Damir Burić may refer to:

- Damir Burić (footballer) (born 1964), Croatian football coach and former player
- Damir Burić (water polo) (born 1980), Croatian water polo player
