= Puljić =

Puljić is a Croatian and Bosnian surname. People with the surname include:

- Ante Puljić (born 1987), Croatian footballer
- Jakov Puljić (born 1993), Croatian footballer
- Ljubo Puljić (born 2007), Croatian footballer
- Tomislav Puljić (born 1983), Croatian footballer
- Vinko Puljić (born 1945), Bosnian Catholic cardinal
- Želimir Puljić (born 1947), Croatian prelate of the Catholic Church
