= Panić =

Panić (Cyrillic: Панић) (IPA: /ˈpa.nitɕ/ pronounced Pa.ni.ch) is a surname found in Serbia, Bosnia and Croatia. Notable people include:

- Branko Panić (born 1977), Croatian football player
- Milan Panić (born 1929), American and Serbian multimillionaire, Prime Minister of the Federal Republic of Yugoslavia from 1992-1993
- Života Panić (1933–2003), Colonel General of Yugoslav People's Army
- Željko Panić (born 1976), Bosnian Serb swimmer
- Romana Panić (born 1975), a Serbian singer
- Jovan Panić (born 1991), a Serbian Civil Engineer and BIM Professional

== See also ==
- Panich, Americanized form in Thailand and in Serbian diaspora
