= Pavlic =

Pavlic, Pavlić and Pavlič are South Slavic surnames. They may refer to:

- Pavlić:
  - Pavlić noble family, a Ragusan noble family from the city of Dubrovnik
  - Đorđe Pavlić (1938–2015), Serbian football striker
- Pavlič:
  - Jure Pavlič, Yugoslav cyclist
- Pavlic:
  - Jurica Pavlic, Croatian speedway rider
  - Milton F. Pavlic (1909–1942), United States Navy officer
