= Tomaš (surname) =

Tomaš is a surname. Notable people with the surname include:

- Stjepan Tomaš (c. 1411–1461), penultimate King of Bosnia, from 1443 until his death
- Ivo-Valentino Tomaš, (1993–2019), Croatian footballer
