= Vranić (surname) =

Vranić (Serbian: Вранић) is a Bosnian, Serbian and Croatian surname. Slovenian spelling: Vranič. Notable people with the surname include:

- Dušan Vranić, Bosnian musician
- Marko Vranić (born 1978), Serbian footballer
- Mladen Vranić (1930–2019), Croatian Canadian diabetes researcher
- Vladimir Vranić (1896–1976), Croatian mathematician
