= Maja Grbić =

Serbian politician

Maja Grbić (Serbian Cyrillic: Маја Грбић; born 1980) is a politician in Serbia. She served in the National Assembly of Serbia from 2020 to 2021 as a member of the Serbian Progressive Party.

== Private life ==
Grbić has a Bachelor of Laws degree. She is from Stara Pazova, Vojvodina.

== Politician ==
=== Municipal politics ===
Grbić has been a member of the Progressive Party's municipal board in Stara Pazova. She has also served as assistant to the mayor of Stara Pazova for agriculture and communal activities and has led the municipality's department of urban works and construction.

=== Parliamentarian ===
Grbić received the ninety-seventh position on the Progressive Party's Aleksandar Vučić — For Our Children list in the 2020 parliamentary election and was elected when the list won a landslide majority with 188 mandates. During her time in parliament, she was a member of the committee on spatial planning, transport, infrastructure, and telecommunications; a deputy member of the health and family committee and the environmental protection committee; the head of Serbia's parliamentary friendship group with the Solomon Islands; and a member of the parliamentary friendship groups with Austria, China, Greece, Israel, Qatar, and Russia. She resigned from the assembly on 30 June 2021.
