= Posavec (surname) =

Posavec is a surname, which is derived from the region of Posavina.

It is the third most common surname in Koprivnica-Križevci County and the fourth most common in Varaždin County of Croatia.

Notable people with the surname include:

- Ivana Posavec Krivec (born 1975), Croatian politician
- Josip Posavec (born 1996), Croatian footballer
- Mladen Posavec (born 1971), Croatian footballer
- Paula Posavec (born 1996), Croatian handball player
- Srebrenko Posavec (born 1980), Croatian footballer
- Stefanie Posavec (born 1981), American information designer
- Stela Posavec (born 1996), Croatian handball player
