= Sokač =

Sokač is a Croatian surname.

It is among the most common surnames in the Koprivnica-Križevci County of Croatia.

It may refer to:

- Maja Sokač (born 1982), Croatian handball player
