= Kosić =

Kosić may refer to:

- Kosić, Montenegro, a village near Danilovgrad
- Domagoj Kosić, Croatian footballer
- Dušan Kosić (born 1971), Slovenian footballer and manager
- Bojan Kosić (born 1990), Montenegrin alpine skier
- Petar Kosić (1881–1949), Serbian officer and Yugoslav Army General
