= Poljak (surname) =

Poljak is a surname. Notable people with the surname include:

- Allegra Poljak (born 1999), Serbian professional footballer
- Eszter Poljak (born 1952), Yugoslav sports shooter
- Maja Poljak (born 1983), Croatian volleyball player
- Mateo Poljak (born 1989), Croatian professional footballer
- Miroslav Poljak (1944–2015), Croatian water polo player
- Roberto Poljak (1932–2019), Argentine biophysicist and immunologist
- Stjepan Poljak (born 1983), Croatian football midfielder
- Željko Poljak (born 1959), Croatian basketball coach
