= Šantić =

Šantić (Serbian: Шантић) is a surname. Notable people with the surname include:

- Aleksa Šantić (1868–1924), Bosnian Serb poet
- Tony Šantić (born 1952), noted Australian thoroughbred owner and tuna farmer

→ Šantić (Santic) Noble family
