= Tomić =

Tomić (pronounced [tômitɕ, tǒː-]) is a common family name found in Croatia, Serbia, Montenegro and Bosnia and Herzegovina. It is sometimes transliterated as Tomic(h) or T(h)omich outside these areas, as well as other varieties (for ex. Tomitsch, Tomicz etc.).

It is the second most common surname in the Primorje-Gorski Kotar County of Croatia, and among the most frequent ones in two other counties. In Croatia, most of surname bearers live in Zagreb, Split, Rijeka and in the Imotski area, while among Croats of Bosnia and Herzegovina it is common in western Herzegovina (Tomislavgrad) and central Bosnia. There are mentions of the surname as early as in 1516 in Croatian Catholic registry books.

The name is a patronymic based on the given names Tomislav and Toma, names cognate to English Thomas.

Notable people with the surname include:

- Aleksandra Tomić (born 1969), Serbian politician
- Ante Tomić (writer) (born 1970), Croatian writer
- Ante Tomić (basketball) (born 1987), Croatian basketball player
- Ante Tomić (footballer) (born 1983), Croatian football player
- Bernard Tomic (born 1992), German-born Australian tennis player of Bosnian and Croatian origin
- Boban Tomić (born 1988), Slovenian basketball player
- Danica Tomić (1905–1961), Serbian aviator
- Dario Tomić (born 1987), Bosnian Croat football player
- Đorđe Tomić (born 1972), former Serbian football player
- Dragan Tomić (Serbian politician, born 1935), acting President of Serbia in 1997
- Dragan Tomić (Serbian politician, born 1946), two-term mayor of Vranje
- Dragan Tomić (Serbian politician, born 1958), two-term parliamentarian
- Dragan Tomić (IT engineer), Serbian computer engineer
- Dragomir Dragan Tomić, Serbian entrepreneur and politician
- Duško Tomić (1958–2017), Serbian football manager and former player
- Fabjan Tomić (born 1995), Croatian football player
- Goran Tomić (born 1977), Croatian football manager and former player
- Ivan Tomić (born 1976), Serbian football manager and former player
- Jaša Tomić (1856–1922), Serbian politician and publisher
- Josephine Tomic (born 1989), Australian cyclist
- Josip Eugen Tomić (1843–1906), Croatian writer
- Jovan Tomić (1869–1932), Serbian historian
- Kristina Tomić (born 1995), Croatian taekwondo practitioner
- Mario Tomić (born 1988), Croatian handball player
- Marko Tomić (born 1991), Serbian football player
- Mijat Tomić (died 1656), a Croatian hajduk
- Milan Tomić (born 1973), former Serbian-Greek basketball player
- Milivoje Tomić (1920–2000), Serbian actor
- Miloš Tomić (born 1980), Serbian rower
- Mimoza Nestorova-Tomić (born 1929), Macedonian architect and urban planner
- Miodrag Tomić (1888–1962), Serbian aviator
- Nemanja Tomić (born 1988), Serbian football player
- Novak Tomić (1936–2003), Serbian football player
- Obrad Tomić (born 1993), Bosnian basketball player
- Petar Tomić (born 1982), Croatian football player
- Petar Tomić, journalist (1949–2024), Yugoslav journalist
- Predrag Tomić (born 1953), Serbian football player
- Radomiro Tomic (1914–1992), Chilean politician of Croatian origin
- Sandro Tomić (born 1972), Croatian football player
- Sara Tomic (born 1998), Australian tennis player, sister of Bernard
- Tomislav Tomić (born 1990), Bosnian football player of Croatian origin
- Vjekoslav Tomić (born 1983), Croatian football player
- Vladan Tomić (1967–2016), Cypriot football player
- Vukašin Tomić (born 1987), Serbian football player
- Živorad Tomić (born 1951), Croatian film director
- Zoran Tomić (politician) (born 1988), Serbian politician
- Zoran Tomić (footballer) (born 1989), Bosnian football player

== See also ==
- Jaša Tomić, Sečanj, a town in Serbia named after Jaša Tomić
- Radomiro Tomić mine, a copper mine in Chile, named after Radomir Tomic
- Tomić Psalter, a 14th-century Bulgarian psalter discovered in 1901
