= Marjan (name) =

Marjan is a Dutch, Polish, and Iranian version of the feminine given name Marianne. The Iranian feminine given name also means "coral" (wikt:مرجان). The name is also a Macedonian, Slovene, Croatian, and Serbian version of the masculine given name Marius. Notable people with this name include:

== Given name ==
=== Masculine ===
- Marjan Altiparmakovski (born 1991), Macedonian footballer
- Marjan Amalietti (1923–1988), Slovene architect
- Marjan Bojadziev (born 1967), Macedonian economist
- Marjan Bolhar (born 1976), Slovenian athlete and professional firefighter
- Marjan Burgar (born 1952), Slovenian biathlete
- Marjan Čakarun (born 1990), Croatian basketball player
- Marjan Dema (born 1957), Kosovan mathematician
- Marjan Dikaučič, Slovenian politician
- Marjan Dominko (born 1969), Slovenian footballer
- Marjan Eid (born 1979), Bahraini football manager
- Marjan Faleel (born 1962), Sri Lankan politician
- Marjan Fuks (1884–1935), Polish photographer, photojournalist and film-maker
- Marjan Gerasimovski (born 1974), Macedonian footballer
- Marjan Gjurov (born 1980), Macedonian basketball player
- Marjan Gorenc (born 1964), Slovenian ice hockey player
- Marjan Ilievski (born 1975), Macedonian basketball player
- Marjan Janeski (born 1988), Macedonian basketball player
- Marjan Jelenko (born 1991), Slovenian Nordic skier
- Marjan Jugović (born 1983), Serbian footballer
- Marjan Kandus (1931–2024), Slovenian basketball player
- Marjan Keršič (1920–2003), Slovenian sculptor and mountaineer
- Marjan Kolev (born 1977), Macedonian handball player
- Marjan Kovačević (born 1957), Serbian chess problemist
- Marjan Kozina (1907–1966), Slovene composer
- Marjan Lazovski (born 1962), Macedonian basketball player
- Marjan Manček (born 1948), Slovene illustrator, cartoonist and animator
- Marjan Hussein Marjan (born 1979), Kenyan chief executives
- Marjan Marković (born 1981), Serbian footballer
- Marjan Mesec (born 1947), Slovenian ski jumper
- Marjan Mijajlović (born 1972), Bosnian sports commentator
- Marjan Mijić (born 1978), Serbian singer
- Marjan Mladenović (born 1987), Macedonian basketball player
- Marjan Mrmić (born 1965), Croatian football goalkeeper
- Marjan Mozetich (born 1948), Slovenian-Canadian composer
- Marjan Pečar (1941–2019), Slovenian ski jumper
- Marjan Pejoski (born 1968), Macedonian fashion designer
- Marjan Pengov (1913–1991), Yugoslav fencer
- Marjan Petković (born 1979), German footballer
- Marjan Pipenbaher (born 1957), Slovenian structural engineer and bridge specialist
- Marjan Radeski (born 1995), Macedonian footballer
- Marjan Rožanc (1930–1990), Slovenian author, playwright, and journalist
- Marjan Šarec (born 1977), Slovenian politician and actor, Prime Minister of Slovenia since 2018
- Marjan Sekulovski (born 1973), Macedonian football coach
- Marjan Šemrl (born 1954), Slovenian correspondence chess grandmaster
- Marjan Šetinc (born 1949), Slovenian psychologist, politician and ambassador
- Marjan Srbinovski (born 1974), Macedonian basketball coach
- Marjan Stojkovski (born 1965), Macedonian footballer
- Marjan Strojan (born 1949), Slovene poet, journalist and translator
- Marjan Štrukelj (born 1964), Slovenian slalom canoer
- Marjan Turnšek (born 1955), Slovenian Roman Catholic prelate
- Marjan Vidmar (born 1960), Slovenian biathlete
- Marjan Zaninović (1911–1968), Croatian rower
- Marjan Žbontar (born 1954), Slovenian ice hockey goaltender
- Marjan Živković (born 1973), Serbian football coach

=== Feminine ===
- Marjan (singer) (1948–2020), Iranian singer and actress
- Marjan Ackermans-Thomas (born 1942), Dutch pentathlete
- Marjan van den Akker (born 1965), Dutch computer scientist and operations researcher
- Marjan Sheikholeslami Aleagha (born 1966), Iranian journalist, political activist, businesswoman, and fugitive embezzler
- Marjan van Aubel (born 1985), Dutch solar designer
- Marjan Berk (1932–2026), Dutch writer, actress, and singer
- Marjan Davari (born 1966), imprisoned Iranian researcher, translator and writer
- Marjan Farsad (born 1983), Iranian animator, illustrator, singer, and songwriter
- Marjan Haydaree (born 1998), Afghan footballer
- Marjan al-Katib al-Islami, Iranian calligrapher
- Marjan Jahangiri (born 1962) British professor of cardiac surgery
- Marjan Janus (born 1952), Dutch swimmer
- Marjan Jonkman (born 1994), Dutch fashion model
- Marjan Kalhor (born 1988), Iranian alpine skier
- Marjan Kamali (born 1971), Iranian-born writer, author of The Stationery Shop and Together Tea
- Marjan Mashkour (born 1970), Iranian zooarchaeologist
- Marjan Minnesma (1966–2026), Dutch activist
- Marjan Nazghlich (1974–2015), Iranian Governor of Golestan Province
- Marjan Neshat (born 1975/76), Iranian actress
- Marjan Olyslager (born 1962), Dutch sprinter
- Marjan Oudeman (born 1958), Dutch business executive, President of Utrecht University
- Marjan Pentenga (born 1964), Dutch rower
- Marjan Ridder (born 1953), Dutch badminton player
- Marjan Salahshouri (born 1996), Iranian taekwondo practitioner
- Marjan Sax (born 1947), Dutch feminist activist
- Marjan Schwegman (born 1951), Dutch historian
- Marjan Smit (born 1975), Dutch softball player
- Marjan Unger (1946–2018), Dutch art historian
- Marjan op den Velde (born 1971), Dutch water polo player

== See also ==
- Marijan, cognate Croatian name
- Marian (given name)
- Marjanović
- Marja (name), Finnish and Dutch feminine given name
- Marjana, Slavic feminine given name
