= Marija =

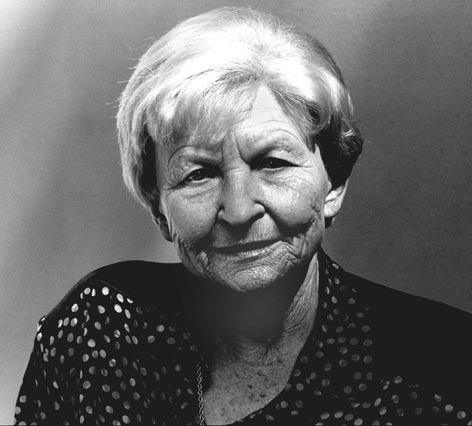
- Marija Gimbutas
- Gender: female

Origin
- Origin: Hebrew via Latin and Greek

Other names
- Related names: Mary, Maria, Mariah, Marie, Mariya, Marijana, Marjana, Maryam, Miriam

Marija is a feminine given name, a variation of the name Maria, which was in turn a Latin form of the Greek names Μαριαμ, or Mariam, and Μαρια, or Maria, found in the New Testament. Depending on phonological rules concerning consecutive vowels or the use of the palatal approximant, "Mary" in these languages is Marija if consecutive vowels are disallowed and otherwise Maria.

Marija is the most common female name in Croatia. The name Marija was the most common feminine given name until 1969.

The male equivalents are Marijan, Marijo and Mario.

Notable people with the name include:

- Marija Aleksić (born 1997), Bosnian footballer
- Marija Anzulović (born 1968), Croatian volleyball player
- Marija Atanassowa (1926–2000), Bulgarian pilot
- Marija Bankauskaitė (1933–1992), Lithuanian ceramics artist
- Marija Banušić (born 1995), Swedish footballer
- Marija Hladnik Berden (1892–1924), Slovenian teacher, organist, and composer
- Marija Pejčinović Burić (born 1963), Croatian politician
- Marija Bursać (1920–1943), Yugoslav partisan
- Marija Ćirović, Montenegrin model
- Marija Čolić (born 1990), Serbian handball player
- Marija Dostanić (born 1999), Serbian sprint canoer
- Marija Dūdienė (1927–2012), Lithuanian painter
- Marija Essen (1872–1956), Russian revolutionary and writer
- Marija Gimbutas (1921–1994), Lithuanian archaeologist
- Marija Gluvakov (born 1973), Serbian pianist
- Marija Ilić (footballer) (born 1993), Serbian footballer
- Marija D. Ilić (born 1951), Serbian-American electrical engineer
- Marija Ivandekić (born 1925), Yugoslav gymnast
- Marija Iveković-Meštrović (born 1981), Croatian Paralympic athlete
- Marija Jambrišak (1847–1937), Croatian writer, educator
- Marija Jovanović (Montenegrin handballer) (born 1985), Montenegrin handball player
- Marija Jovanović (Serbian handballer) (born 1995), Serbian handball player
- Marija Karan (born 1982), Serbian actress
- Marija Kartanaitė (1932–2017), Lithuanian chess player
- Marija Kaznačenko (born 1993), Lithuanian biathlete
- Marija Kavtaradzė (born 1991), Lithuanian film director and screenwriter
- Marija Kessler (1860–1939), Slovenian salonist
- Marija Klobčar, Slovenian ethnologist
- Marija Kohn (1934–2018), Croatian actress
- Marija Kolaroska (born 1997), Macedonian cross-country skier
- Marija Kuznecova (born 2010), Latvian chess player
- Marija Laništanin (born 1995), Serbian handball player
- Marija Lastauskienė (1872–1957), Lithuanian writer
- Marija Leiko (1887–1938), Latvian actress
- Marija Leković (born 1963), Serbian politician
- Marija Leković (basketball) (born 2003), Montenegrin basketball player
- Marija Lojpur (born 1983), Serbian handball player
- Marija Lugarić (born 1978), Croatian politician
- Marija Mačiulienė (born 1929), Lithuanian painter
- Marija Makarovič (born 1930), Slovene ethnologist
- Marija Mijot (1902–1994), Slovenian seamstress, folk poet and writer
- Marija Milinković (born 2004), Bosnian footballer
- Marija Mirković (born 1990), Serbian-Australian tennis player
- Marija Naumova (born 1973), Latvian singer
- Marija Nikolova, Macedonian singer
- Marija Obradović (handballer) (born 1992), Serbian handball player
- Marija Obradović (politician) (born 1974), Serbian politician
- Marija Obrenović (c. 1831–1876), Moldavian and Romanian aristocrat
- Marija Omaljev-Grbić (born 1982), Croatian actress
- Marija Pečkauskaitė (1877–1930), Lithuanian writer under the pen name Šatrijos Ragana
- Marija Petković (1892–1966), Croatian nun
- Marija Petrović (handballer) (born 1994), Serbian handball player
- Marija Petrović (basketball) (born 1988), Serbian basketball player
- Marija Petrović (chess player) (born 1953), Serbian chess player
- Marija Radojičić (born 1992), Serbian footballer
- Marija Selak Raspudić (born 1982), Croatian politician
- Marija Razgutė (born 1985), Lithuanian film producer
- Marija Rus (1921–2019), Slovenian French scholar and poet
- Marija Senica (born 1970), Serbian synchronized swimmer
- Marija Šerifović (born 1984), Serbian singer
- Marija Šestak (born 1979), Slovenian triple jumper
- Marija Šestić (born 1987), Bosnian Serb singer
- Marija Šibajeva (born 2002), Lithuanian chess player
- Marija Škaričić (born 1977), Croatian actress
- Marija Edita Šolić (1946–2021), Croatian botanist
- Marija Ružička Strozzi (1850–1937), Croatian actress
- Marija Lucija Stupica (1950–2002), Slovenian writer
- Marija Šuštar (1905–1989), Slovenian ethnochoreologist and folklorist
- Marija Težak (born 1957), Slovenian gymnast
- Marija Tolj (born 1999), Croatian discus thrower
- Marija Trmčić (born 1986), Serbian alpine skier
- Marija Ugrica (born 1995), Serbian singer
- Marija Ujević-Galetović (1933–2023), Croatian sculptor
- Marija Vecrumba (1885–1919), Latvian physician
- Marija Vojskovič (1915–1997), Slovene writer
- Marija Vučenović (born 1993), Serbian javelin thrower
- Marija Vučinović (born 1958), Montenegrin engineer and politician
- Marija Vučković (born 1974), Croatian politician
- Marija Vujović (born 1984), Montenegrin model
- Marija Vukčević (born 1986), Montenegrin footballer
- Marija Vuković (born 1992), Montenegrin athlete
- Marija Vuković (footballer) (born 1990), Serbian footballer
- Princess Marija of Yugoslavia, the only child of Prince Nikolas of Yugoslavia and Ljiljana Licanin
- Marija Jurić Zagorka (1873–1957), Croatian author
- Marija Zerova (1902–1994), Ukrainian mycologist
