= Marjo =

Marjo may refer to:

- Marjo (singer), Canadian singer-songwriter, given name Marjolène
- Marjo (name), Finnish and Dutch given name

== See also ==
- Marijo
