= Ukrinai =

- Village
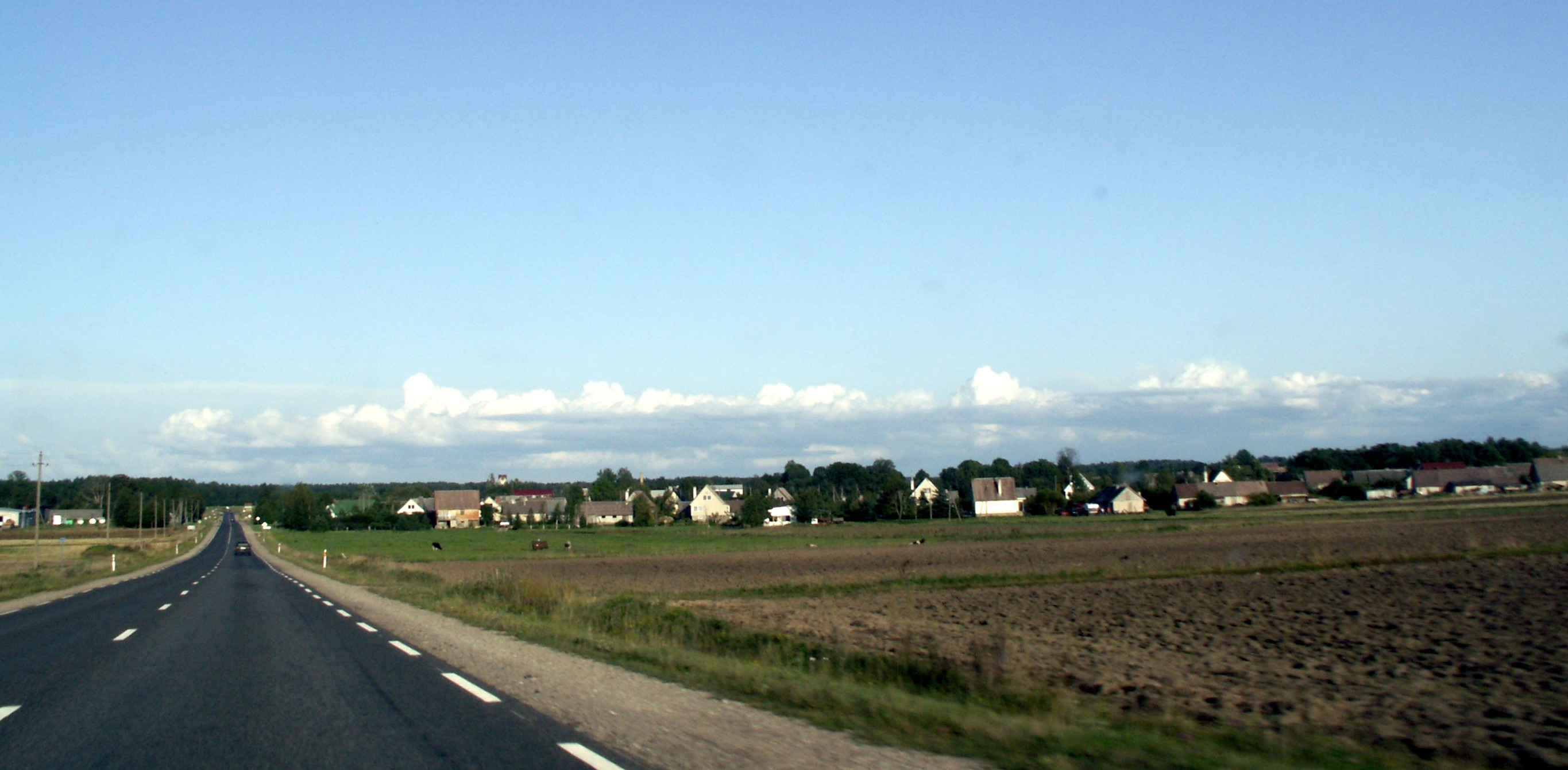

- Location of Ukriniai
- Coordinates: 56°18′N 22°06′E
- Country: Lithuania
- Ethnographic region: Samogitia
- County: Telšiai County
- Municipality: Mažeikiai district municipality
- Eldership: Židikai eldership
- First mentioned: 1585

Population (2011)
  - Total: 424
- Time zone: UTC+2 (EET)
  - Summer (DST): UTC+3 (EEST)

Ukrinai (Samogitian: Okrėnā) is a village in Mažeikiai district municipality, Lithuania. It is located 16 km west of Mažeikiai.

Ukrinai was first mentioned in annals in 1585. The town has the church of Saint Anthony of Padua, and a monument by architect S. Gailevičius commemorating the abolition of serfdom. There was also a high school, however it was closed in September, 2017.

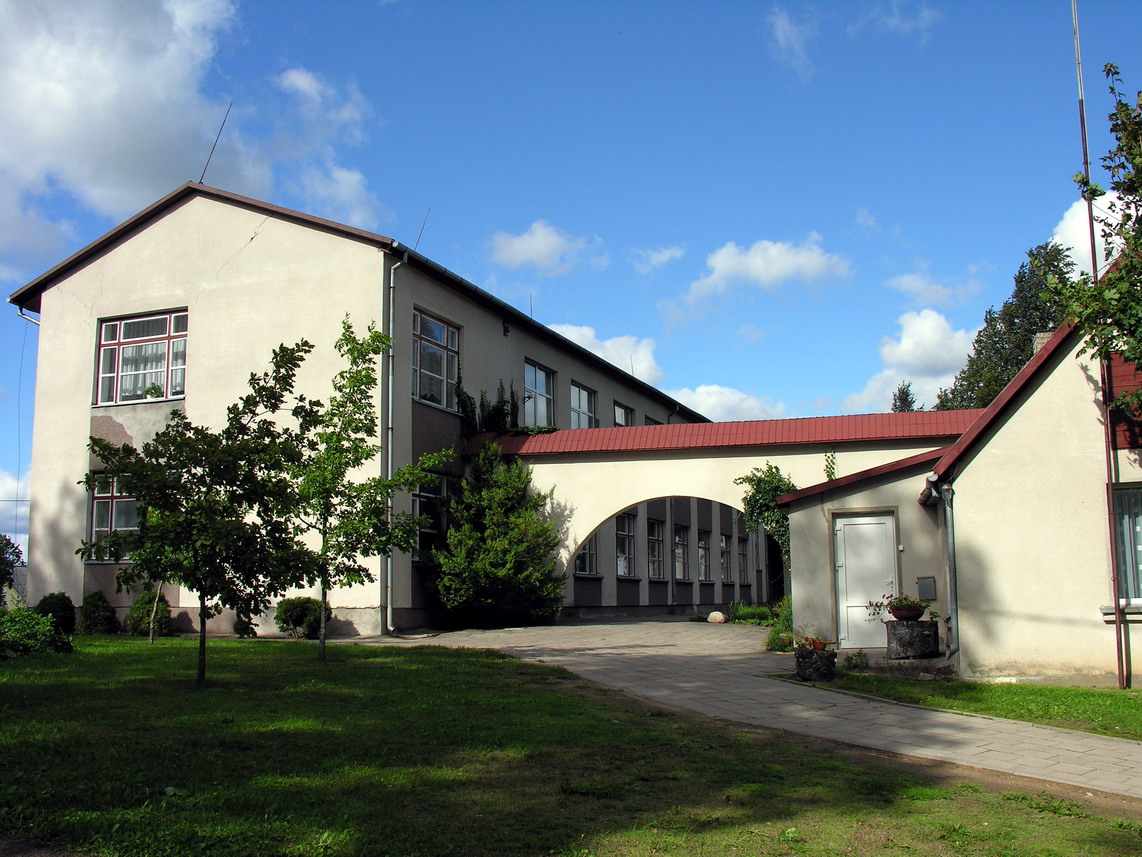
Ukrinai high school (closed in 2017)
