= Židikai Marija Pečkauskaitė secondary school =

Coordinates: 56°19′30″N 22°00′31″E

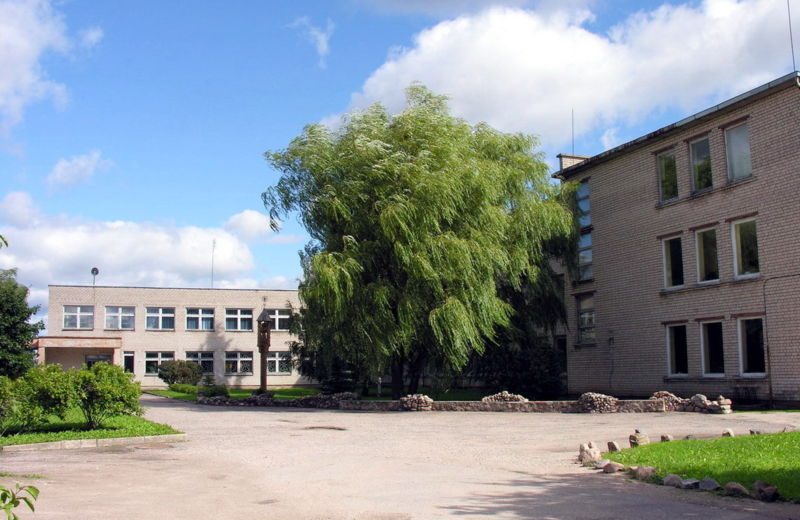
- Židikai; Lithuania

Information
- Type: Secondary school
- Motto: Well-educated and spiritual human prepared to live in civil society
- Established: 1865
- Principal: Rima Širvinskienė

Židikai Marija Pečkauskaitė secondary school (Lithuanian: Židikų Marijos Pečkauskaitės vidurinė mokykla) is a secondary school located in Židikai, Lithuania.

This school is the oldest one in the Mažeikiai district municipality. It was founded in 1865. In 1989, the name of Marija Pečkauskaitė was given to the school to honor famous author and educational Šatrijos Ragana, who lived in Židikai from 1915 until she died in 1930.

== Principals of the school ==
- Juozas Garška (1940–1948)
- Algirdas Gailius (1949–1956)
- Irena Paulauskienė (1956–1958)
- Birutė Kekienė (1959–1964)
- Aleksandras Bašermanovas (1964–1969)
- Vytautas Rimiškis (1969–1975)
- Alfonsas Dagys (1975–1985)
- Paulius Perminas (1985–1990)
- Andrius Meinorius (1990–1993)
- Rima Širvinskienė (1993–present)
