= Marijana =

Marijana (Cyrillic: Маријана) is a feminine given name found in South Slavic languages. It is cognate to Maryanne or Mary Ann.

It may refer to:

- Marijana Balić (born 1981), Croatian politician
- Marijana Goranović (born 1989), Montenegrin Paralympic shot putter
- Marijana Kovačević (born 1978), Croatian tennis player
- Marijana Krajnović (born 1988), Serbian politician
- Marijana Lubej (born 1945), Slovenian sprinter
- Marijana Marković (born 1982), German fencer of Serbian descent
- Marijana Matthäus (born 1971), Serbian entrepreneur
- Marijana Mićić (born 1983), Serbian TV host
- Marijana Mišković Hasanbegović (born 1982), Croatian judoka
- Marijana Petir (born 1975), Croatian politician
- Marijana Radovanović (born 1972), Serbian singer
- Marijana Rajčić (born 1989), Australian rules football player
- Marijana Ribičić (born 1979), Croatian volleyball player
- Marijana Rupčić (born c. 1986), Croatian model
- Marijana Savić, Serbian activist
- Marijana Šurković (born 1984), Croatian swimmer

== See also ==
- Marija
- Mariana (name)
- Marjana
