= Marijanović =

Marijanović is a Serbo-Croatian surname, a patronymic derived from the masculine given name Marijan. Notable people with the surname include:

- Dejan Marijanovič (born 1987), Slovenian footballer
- Robert Marijanović (born 1980), German-Croatian darts player
- Tomislav Marijanović (born 1981), Croatian judoka

== See also ==
- Marjanović
