= Šlekys =

Šlekys is a Lithuanian surname. Notable people with the surname include:

- Audrius Šlekys (1975–2002), Lithuanian football player
- Emilis Šlekys (1951–2012), Lithuanian chess master
- Vaidotas Šlekys (born 1972), Lithuanian football player
