= Maarja =

Female given name

- Gender: Female
- Language: Estonian
- Name day: 25 March

Origin
- Region of origin: Estonia

Other names
- Related names: Maari, Maarika, Mari, Maria, Marie, Marika, Marili, Marja, Marje, Marjo, Marju

Maarja is an Estonian feminine given name. It is considered to be the Estonian form of the name Maria (and therefore Mary). The name is common in Estonia, and may refer to any of the following persons:

- Maarja-Liis Ilus (born 1980; sometimes known as just "Maarja"), singer
- Maarja Jakobson (born 1977), actress
- Maarja Kangro (born 1973), poet, short story writer and librettist
- Maarja Kivi (born 1986; also known as "Marya Roxx"), singer
- Maarja Kruusmaa (born 1970), computer scientist and professor
- Maarja Johanna Mägi (born 1997), actress
- Maarja Nummert (born 1944), architect
- Maarja Nuut (born 1986), singer and violinist
- Maarja Saulep (born 1991), footballer
- Maarja Vaino (born 1976), literary scholar

== See also ==
- Maarja-Magdaleena, village in Tabivere Parish, Jõgeva County
- Väike-Maarja, settlement in Väike-Maarja Parish, Lääne-Viru County
- Marja (disambiguation)
