= Marjanović =

Marjanović (Serbian Cyrillic: Марјановић, pronounced [marjǎːnoʋitɕ]) is a Serbian, Croatian and Bosnian surname, a patronymic derived from the masculine given name Marjan. Its bearers are Serbs, Croats and Bosniaks.

It is among the most common surnames in the Brod-Posavina County of Croatia.

It may refer to:

- Alimpije Marjanovic (1874–1940), Serbian revolutionary and Chetnik commander
- Andrija Marjanović (born 1999), Serbian basketball player
- Blagoje "Moša" Marjanović (1907–1984), Serbian football forward
- Boban "Bobi" Marjanović (1988–), Serbian professional basketball player
- Bogdan Marjanović (1980–), Serbian footballer
- Bojan Marjanović (born 1981), Serbian pianist and composer based in Norway
- Branko Marjanović (1909–1996), Croatian film director and editor
- Čedomir Marjanović (1906–1945), Serbian politician
- Đorđe Marjanović (1931–2021), Serbian and Yugoslav singer
- Dragan Marjanović (1954–), retired Bosnian football forward
- Filip Marjanović (born 1989), Serbian handball player
- Jovana Marjanović (1983–), Serbian beauty pageant titleholder
- Lazar Marjanović (born 1989), Serbian footballer
- Luka Marjanović (1805–1888), Croatian lawyer and ethnographer
- Marijan Marjanović (1904–1983), Croatian footballer
- Marko Marjanović (1985–), Serbian rower
- Milan Marjanović (1879–1955), Croatian writer and filmmaker
- Milan Marjanović Serbian lawyer and Yugoslav senator
- Mirko Marjanović (1926-?), Serbian basketball player and coach
- Mirko Marjanović (1937–2006), former Prime Minister of Serbia
- Mirko Marjanović (1940–), Croatian writer
- Nebojša Marjanović (born 1959), Serbian politician
- Nikola Marjanović (1905–1983), Serbian football player and manager
- Nikola Marjanović (born 1955), Serbian footballer
- Nikola Marjanović (born 1977), Croatian singer-songwriter
- Nikola Marjanović (born 2001), Serbian footballer
- Radoslav Marjanović (born 1989), Serbian politician
- Rista Marjanović (1885–1969), first Serbian photo-reporter
- Rodoljub Marjanović (1988–), Serbian football player
- Saša Marjanović (1987–), Serbian footballer
- Slavoljub Marjanović (1955–2026), Serbian chess grandmaster
- Smilja Marjanović-Dušanić (born 1963), Serbian historian
- Srđan Marjanović (1952–), Serbian singer-songwriter
- Verona Marjanović (born 1974), Bosnian luger
- Vesna Marjanović (born 1969), Serbian politician
- Zana Marjanović (born 1983), Bosnian actress

== See also ==
- Marijanović
