= Church of St. Anthony of Padua, Ukrinai =

Church in Ukrinai, Lithuania

Church of St. Anthony of Padua Šv. Antano Paduviečio bažnyčia
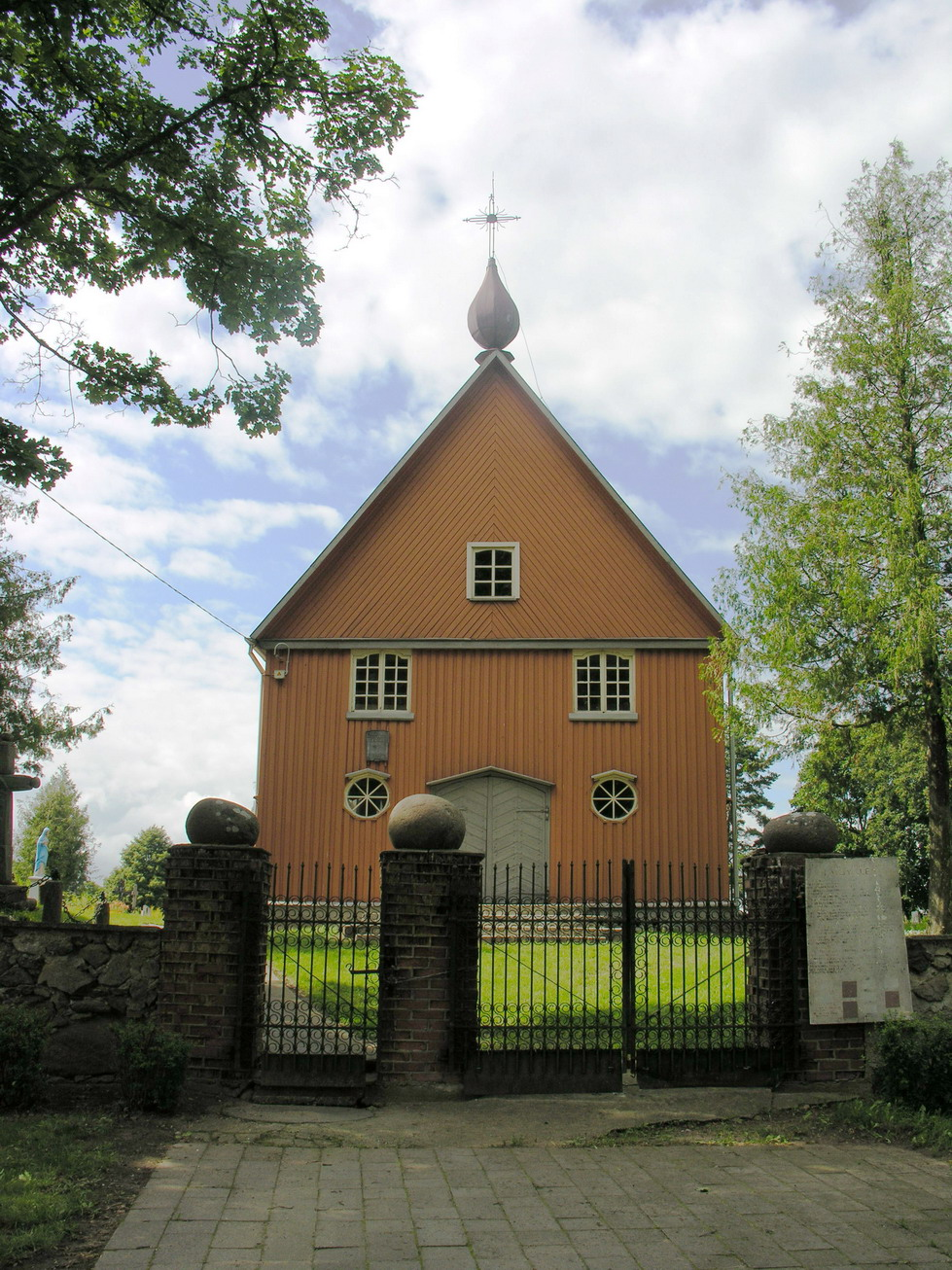

Religion
- Affiliation: Roman Catholic
- Diocese: Mažeikiai District Municipality

Location
- Location: Taikos g. 12, Ukrinai, Lithuania
- Interactive map of Church of St. Anthony of Padua; Šv. Antano Paduviečio bažnyčia
- Coordinates: 56°18′3″N 22°5′19″E

Architecture
- Type: Church
- Style: baroque, Lithuanian vernacular architecture
- Completed: 1857

Specifications
- Direction of façade: East
- Materials: wood

Church of St. Anthony of Padua (Lithuanian: Šv. Antano Paduviečio bažnyčia, Samogitian: Šv. Ontana Padovėitė bažninčė) is a Roman Catholic church in Ukrinai, Lithuania.

== History ==
The first church in Ukrinai was consecrated in 1784. Its construction was probably funded by a nobleman Laurynas Pilsudskis. The nobility of Ukrinai and Bukončiai built a new church in 1803, however it burnt down after around half a century.

Current wooden church was built in 1857 and in 1913 it was enlarged.

Since 1853 Ukrinai has been a filial of Židikai parish.

== Architecture ==
The church is rectangle, with two small towers. There are four altars. It reflects the characteristics of Lithuanian vernacular architecture.

The main altar is a vernacular interpretation of Baroque
