= Marju (given name) =

Female given name

Maarja
- Gender: Female
- Language: Estonian
- Name day: 25 March

Origin
- Region of origin: Estonia

Other names
- Related names: Maari, Maarika, Maarja, Mari, Maria, Marie, Marika, Marili, Marja, Marje, Marjo

Marju is an Estonian feminine given name, a cognate of the English language given name Mary.

As of 1 January 2023, 1,483 women in Estonia bear the first name Marju, making it the 122nd most popular female name in the country. People bearing the name Marju include:

- Marju Kõivupuu (born 1960), Estonian philologist, cultural historian, writer and folklorist
- Marju Kuut (1946–2022), Estonian jazz singer
- Marju Länik (born 1957), Estonian pop singer
- Marju Lauristin (born 1940), Estonian politician
- Marju Lepajõe (1962–2019), Estonian classical philologist, translator and religious historian
