= Christianne van der Wal =

Dutch politician (born 1973)

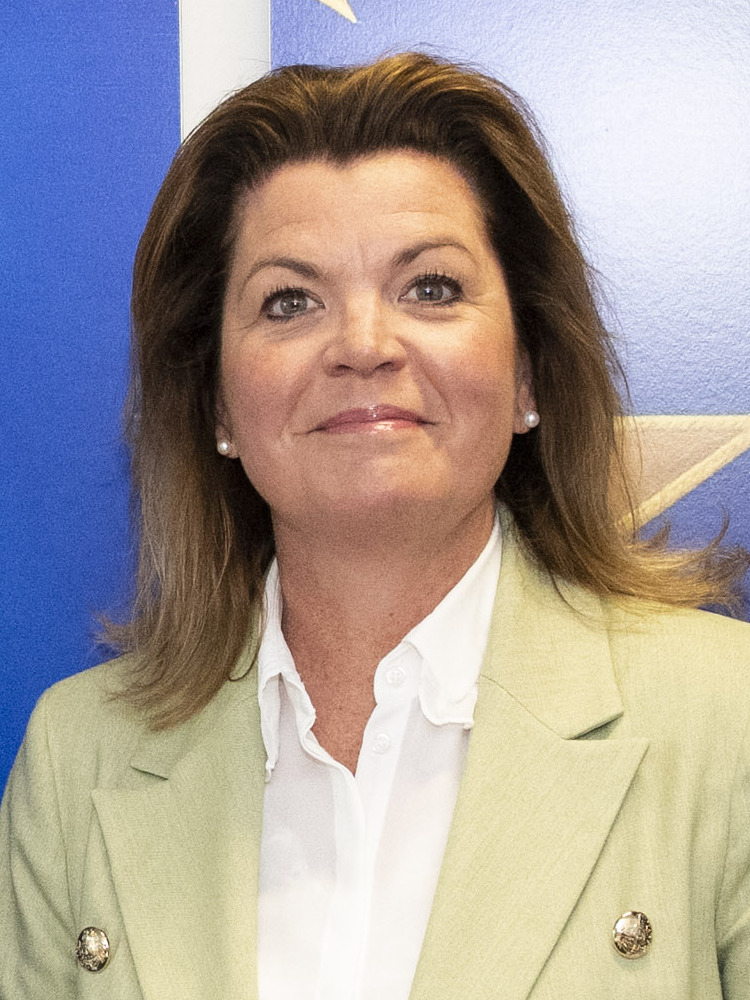
- Van der Wal in 2022

Minister for Nature and Nitrogen Policy
- In office 10 January 2022 – 2 July 2024
- Prime Minister: Mark Rutte
- Preceded by: Position created
- Succeeded by: Position dissolved

Chairwoman of the People's Party for Freedom and Democracy
- In office 25 November 2017 – 10 January 2022
- Leader: Mark Rutte
- Preceded by: Henry Keizer
- Succeeded by: Onno Hoes (ad interim)

Member of the House of Representatives
- In office 6 December 2023 – 26 March 2025

Personal details
- Born: Christianne Zeggelink; 13 November 1973 (age 52) Oldenzaal, Netherlands
- Party: People's Party for Freedom and Democracy
- Education: Inholland University of Applied Sciences
- Occupation: Politician; teacher

Christianne van der Wal-Zeggelink (born 13 November 1973) is a Dutch politician of the People's Party for Freedom and Democracy (VVD).

== Life ==
Van der Wal was born in 1973 in Oldenzaal, Overijssel, and she studied facility management. She was a municipal politician in Harderwijk, and she became chair of the People's Party for Freedom and Democracy starting on 25 November 2017. Van der Wal joined the Provincial Executive of Gelderland in 2019.

She served as Minister for Nature and Nitrogen Policy in the fourth Rutte cabinet between 10 January 2022 and 2 July 2024. During her term in office, the Ecologische Autoriteit was founded in September 2022 to provide advise on plans made by the provinces for the preservation of natural areas. Van der Wal was elected to the House of Representatives in November 2023. After the Schoof cabinet was formed, she told that she had not been interested in another term as minister. She had endorsed the coalition agreement as a member of the VVD parliamentary group, but she said she would not feel comfortable executing it, citing its arrangements on nitrogen policy.

In the House, Van der Wal was the VVD's spokesperson on defense and culture. A motion by Van der Wal was adopted, urging the government to assist museums generate additional revenue by loaning out more of their stored artworks. She added that national funding for renovations should be contingent on participation in such initiatives.

Van der Wal left the House on 26 March 2025. Per 1 September 2025 she became chair of BOVAG.

=== House committee assignments ===
- Committee for Education, Culture and Science
- Committee for Digital Affairs
- Art committee
- Committee for Health, Welfare and Sport
- Committee for Foreign Affairs
- Committee for Defence
- Delegation to the NATO Parliamentary Assembly

== Electoral history ==
Electoral history of Christianne van der Wal
Year	Body	Party	Pos.	Votes	Result		Ref.
Year	Body	Party	Pos.	Votes	Party seats	Individual	Ref.
2012	House of Representatives	People's Party for Freedom and Democracy	60	548	41	Lost	
2023	House of Representatives	People's Party for Freedom and Democracy	5	7,456	24	Won	

Party political offices
Preceded by Henry Keizer	Chairwoman of the People's Party for Freedom and Democracy; 2017–2022	Succeeded by Onno Hoes
