= Marija Branković =

Marija Branković or Maria Branković may refer to:

- Marija Branković, Queen of Bosnia, daughter of despot Lazar Branković of Serbia
- Marija Branković, Marchioness of Montferrat, daughter of despot Stefan Branković of Serbia
- Marija Branković, Countess Frankopan, daughter of despot Jovan Branković of Serbia

== See also ==
- Marija (disambiguation)
- Branković dynasty
