= Marja =

Marja may refer to:

- Marja (name), a Finnish and Dutch female given name
- Marjah, an unincorporated agricultural district in Nad Ali District, Helmand Province, Afghanistan
- Marja', a Shia authority
- Märja, small borough in Tartu urban municipality, Tartu County, Estonia

== See also ==
- Maarja, a given name
