= Marijo =

Marijo is a South Slavic masculine given name, cognate to Mario. Notable people with the name include:

- Marijo Baković (born 1982), retired Croatian long jumper
- Marijo Dodik (born 1974), Bosnian Croat football striker
- Marijo Marić (born 1977), Croatian footballer
- Marijo Moćić (born 1989), Slovenian football midfielder
- Marijo Možnik (born 1987), Croatian gymnast
- Marijo Šivolija (born 1981), Croatian amateur boxer and two-time Olympian
- Marijo Strahonja (born 1975), Croatian association football referee
- Marijo Tot (born 1972), Croatian football manager

== See also ==
- Marija, feminine form
- Zdravo Marijo (English: Hail Mary) is the tenth studio album by Croatian singer Severina
- Zdravo Marijo Tour, concert tour of Croatian pop singer Severine Vučković
- Marjo (name)
