= Rasa Bandzienė =

Lithuanian chess player (born 1961)

Personal information
- Born: 5 July 1961 (age 65)
- Spouse: Algirdas Bandza

Chess career
- Country: Lithuania
- Peak rating: 2175 (July 1996)

Rasa Bandzienė (née Kartanaitė, born 5 July 1961) is a Lithuanian chess player. She is three times winner of the Lithuanian Women's Chess Championship (1978, 1979, 1983).

== Biography ==
Rasa is daughter of the ten-time Lithuanian Women's Chess Championship Marija Kartanaitė, wife of chess International Master (IM) Algirdas Bandza.

She was the champion of the Lithuanian Women's Chess Championship in 1978, 1979 and 1983. In 1978, she shared 1st-2nd places with the out-of-competition Leili Pärnpuu; in 1979 she took 8th place, as all the participants who were higher performed out of the competition. She won a silver medal at the Lithuanian Women's Chess Championships in 1977 and 1984. In 1977 she shared 2nd-3rd places with Vilhelmina Kaušilaitė-Kutavičienė, as they followed the out-of-competition chess candidate of master from Moscow N. Orlova, losing the gold medal on additional indicators. In 1984, she took 3rd place, but received a silver medal, since the winner of the tournament Tamar Khmiadashvili performed out of competition. She won a bronze medal at the Lithuanian Women's Chess Championships in 1981 and 1982. In 1981, she shared 2nd-3rd places, losing the silver medal on additional indicators. In 1982, she took 8th place, with 5 out of 7 participants who placed above her competing out of competition).

She won a silver medal at the Lithuanian Championship in 1996.

With the Lithuanian SSR national team, she was a participant in Spartakiad of the Peoples of the USSR in 1979 and 1983.

With the Žalgiris team, she was a participant in the USSR Team Chess Championship in 1980.

As a member of the Lithuanian National Chess Team she was a participant at the Chess Olympiad in 1996 and European Team Chess Championship in 1992.

After 1996, she does not compete in high-level chess tournaments.
