= Marijan =

Marijan is a male Croatian given name, and it can also be a Croatian surname.

== People named Marijan ==
- Marijan Beneš – Croatian boxer
- Marijan Brkić Brk – Croatian musician
- Marijan Brnčić – Croatian footballer
- Marijan Buljat – Croatian footballer
- Marijan Čerček – Croatian footballer
- Marijan Hinteregger – Croatian-Austrian actor
- Marijan Kanjer – Croatian Olympic swimmer
- Marijan Kovačević – German-Croat footballer
- Marijan Mrmić – Croatian footballer
- Marijan Nikolić – Croatian footballer
- Marijan Oblak – Croatian Catholic archbishop
- Marijan Pušnik – Slovene football manager
- Marijan Šunjić – Bosnian Croat Catholic bishop

== See also ==
- Marjan (name), cognate name also used in Slovenian, Macedonian and Serbian
- Marian (given name)
- Marijana, female South Slavic given name
