= Ecologische Autoriteit =

Dutch advisory organ

The Ecologische Autoriteit (Dutch: Ecologische Auroriteit) is an advisory organ of the Dutch government founded in 2022. It delivers advice on plans to improve the quality of natural areas, especially that of nitrogen sensitive Natura 2000 sites.

== History ==
On 9 September 2022 the Dutch cabinet decided to form the Ecologische Autoriteit. At that point former Christian Democratic Appeal politician Marja van der Tas was named as temporary chair. The Ecologische Autoriteit was formally founded by the Instellingsbesluit Ecologische Autoriteit of 19 September 2022 with a term of 8 years. Hans Mommaas was named as chair for the period 1 November 2022 until 1 November 2026. An advice of Johan Remkes to include agricultural experts in the Ecologische Autoriteit was not followed.

On 1 September 2025 Willemijn Smal became head of the Ecologische Autoriteit.

== Purpose ==
The executive councils of the Provinces of the Netherlands were supposed to deliver plans, specifically nature goal analyses (Dutch: natuurdoelanalyses), in 2023 to improve the quality of natural areas, especially that of nitrogen sensitive Natura 2000 sites. According to Dutch minister for Nature and Nitrogen Policy, Christianne van der Wal, the Ecologische Autoriteit was intended to examine these plans to see whether they were sufficient to reach the intended goals. The provinces were not bound to any advise the Ecologische Autoriteit delivered.

In December 2023 the Ecologische Autoriteit advised the province of Friesland to make an emergency plan to save the large copper, of which the subspecies L. d. batavus is endemic to the Netherlands.

By January 2024 the Ecologische Autoriteit had examined over half the plans. In the majority of the areas nature had declined or threatened to decline. The Ecologische Autoriteit advised to also protect natural areas outside of the protected areas under Natura 2000. It also warned the government that it might have to retract permits to make sure the natural conditions would not decline. It saw nitrogren deposition and water conditions as most vital to improve, stating that 90% of natural areas would not improve unless measures were taken in this regard. It stated that compliance with the Water Framework Directive and its 2027 goals would be at least as impactful for permit issuance as the nitrogen crisis in the Netherlands. It also saw overdrafting and excessive recreation as issues. Of the 70 areas examined only 3 three received the verdict "(reasonably) good", 2 others received the verdict "could be better", the rest received the verdict "poor".

== Methodology ==
The Ecologische Autoriteit does not perform research. It checks whether the ecological substantion of the plans made by the provinces is correct and complete. Per natural area that the Ecologische Autoriteit examines it uses two to six independent experts to assess the situation. The reports the Ecologische Autoriteit makes are made public.
