= Church of St. John the Baptist, Židikai =

Roman Catholic church in Židikai, Lithuania

St. John the Baptist Church Šv. Jono Krikštytojo bažnyčia
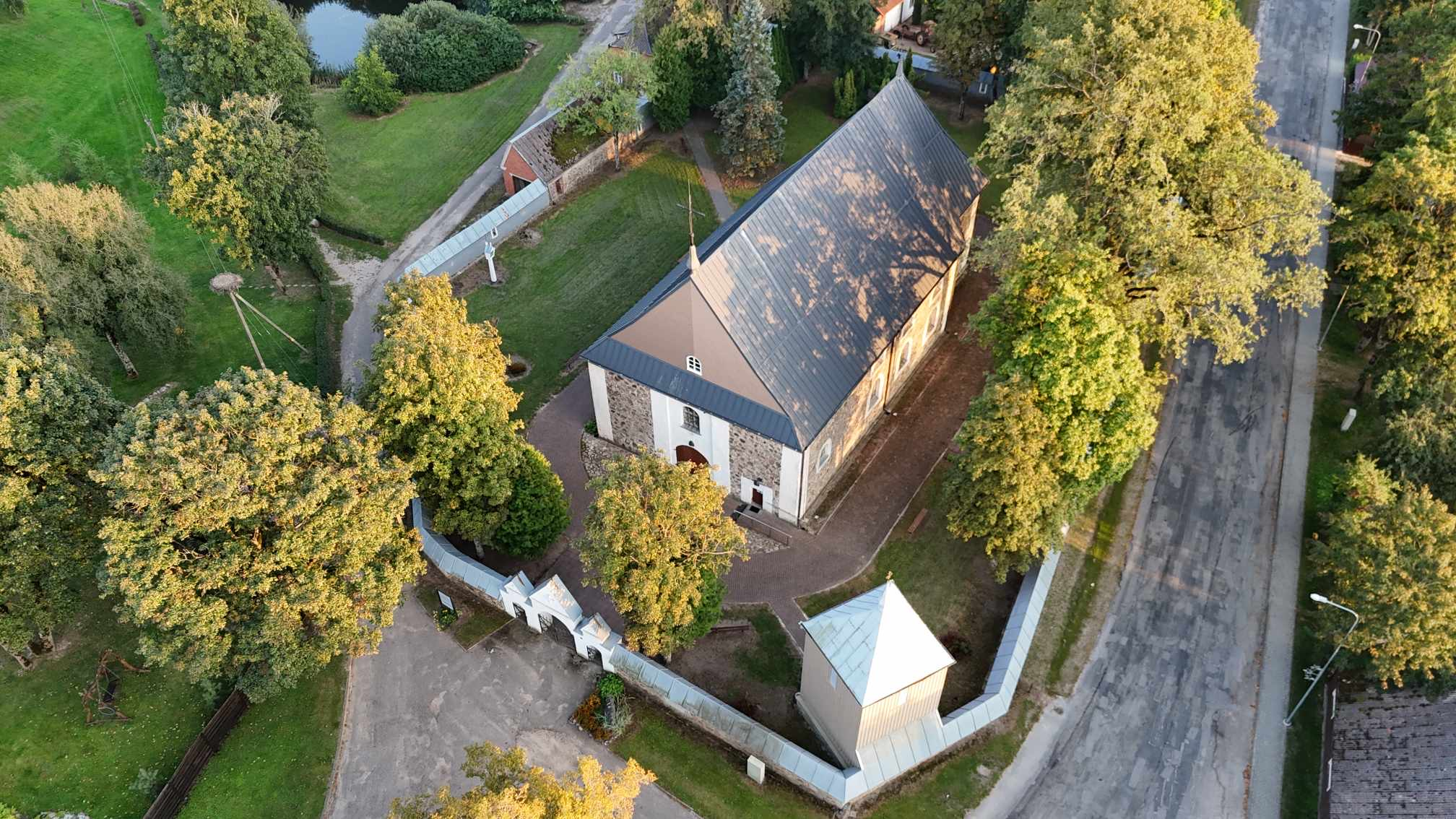
- Židikai Church of St. John the Baptist

Religion
- Affiliation: Roman Catholic
- Year consecrated: 1862

Location
- Location: Židikai, Lithuania
- Interactive map of St. John the Baptist Church; Šv. Jono Krikštytojo bažnyčia
- Coordinates: 56°19′9″N 22°00′44″E

Architecture
- Type: Church
- Style: Classicism and Romanticism
- Completed: 1821

Specifications
- Direction of façade: North
- Materials: stone

St. John the Baptist Church (Lithuanian: Šv. Jono Krikštytojo bažnyčia, Samogitian: Žėdėku šv. Juona Krėkštītoja bažnīče) is a Roman Catholic church in Židikai, Lithuania. It is located in the west of Mažeikiai district municipality, next to the Mažeikiai-Skuodas road.

== History ==
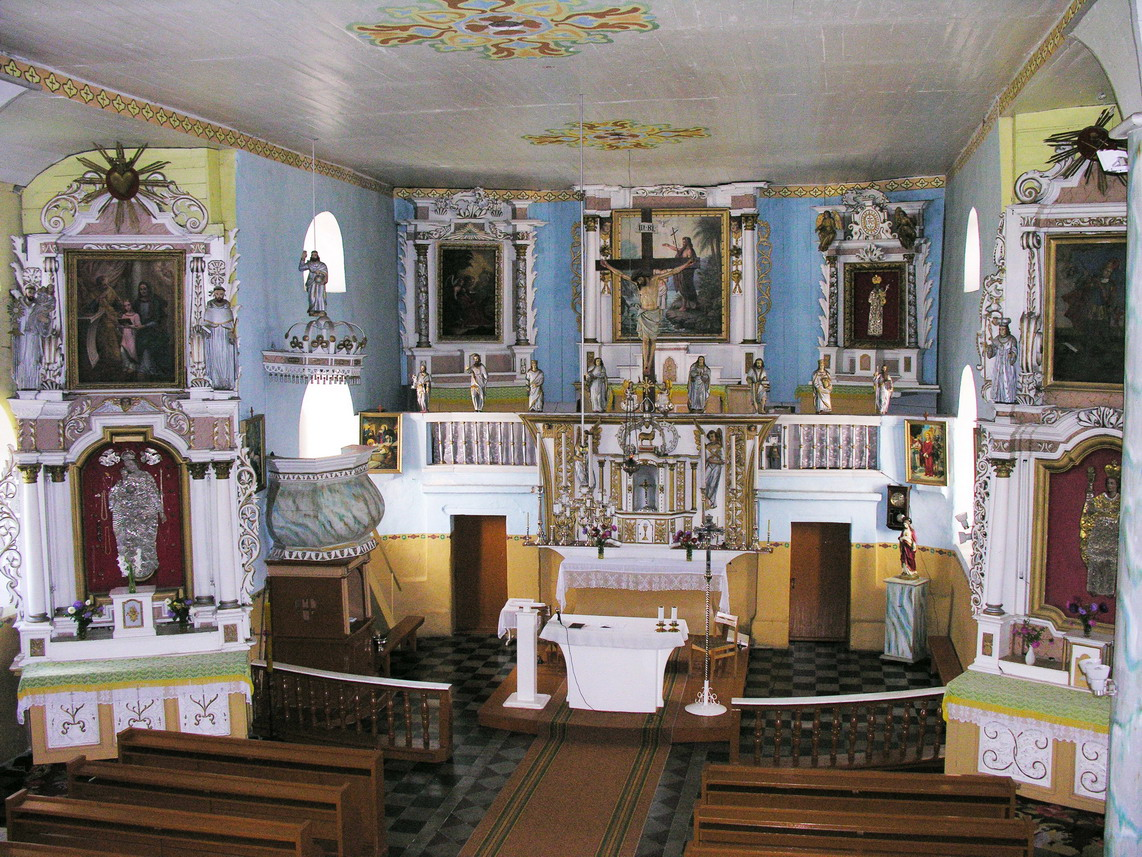
Interior of the Church

The Roman Catholic community in Židikai worshiped in a wooden chapel as early as 1636. The current towerless stone church was constructed in 1821 and it reflects the features of Classicism and Romanticism.

In 1842 the current belfry was built. In 1853 a parish was established and the priest Jonas Vaškevičius was appointed as the first parson of the newly established Židikai Roman Catholic parish. Around 1861 the church was renovated and decorated. On 20 May 1862 the bishop of Samogitia Motiejus Valančius consecrated the church.

In 1900 the current pastorage was built where since 1915 until her death in 1930 lived famous Lithuanian author and educational Šatrijos Ragana. A wooden cross was built in the churchyard after her death to honour the author.

In 1940–1944 the parson at that time Vaclovas Martinkus built a new two-storey pastorage of stone which soon was nationalised by the Soviets and eventually became a hospital.

== Parsons of the church since 1897 ==
- Vincentas Bogdišenka (1897–1906)
- Juozapas Baltrukėnas (1906–1915)
- Kazimieras Bukontas (1915–1939)
- Vaclovas Martinkus (1940–1945)
- Juozapas Našlėnas (1945–1949)
- Povilas Repšys (1949–1957)
- Juozapas Rutalė (1957–1969)
- Jonas Petrauskis (1969–1972)
- Stanislovas Ežerinskas (1972–1974)
- Domininkas Giedra (1975–1983)
- Antanas Gylys (1983–1991)
- Vytautas Gedvainis (1991–1992)
- Romualdas Žulpa (1992–1997)
- Rimantas Gudlinkis (1997–1999)
- Vytautas Vaidila (1999–2009)
- Egidijus Jurgelevičius (2009–2016)
- Antanas Šimkus (2016–2018)
- Dainoras Židackas (since 2018)
