= Algirdas Bandza =

Lithuanian chess player (born 1957)

Personal information
- Born: 19 March 1957 (age 69)
- Spouse: Rasa Kartanaitė

Chess career
- Country: Lithuania
- Title: International Master (1991)
- Peak rating: 2405 (January 1991)

Algirdas Bandza (born 19 March 1957) is a Lithuanian chess player who holds the title of International Master (IM, 1991). He is winner of Lithuanian Chess Championship (1985).

== Biography ==
Algirdas Bandza was a multiple participant of the Lithuanian Chess Championships, in which he won three medals: gold (1985, together with Emilis Šlekys), silver (1997) and bronze (1996). In 1985, he played for Lithuania in Soviet Team Chess Championship. Algirdas Bandza also twice played for Lithuanian chess clubs in European Chess Club Cups (2005, 2009). In 1991, he was awarded the FIDE International Master (IM) title.

Since 1992, Algirdas Bandza has been active participated in correspondence chess tournaments. His main achievement is the silver medal of the European Team Correspondence Chess Championship as part of the Lithuanian team (7th board; competitions were held from 1999 to 2009). In 1991, he was awarded the ICCF International Correspondence Chess Master (IM) title.

Also Algirdas Bandza known as a chess trainer. Since 2010, he has been the head of the chess section at the Lithuanian Center for Children and Youth. In 2014, he organized the Lithuanian Republican Center for Chess Amateurs.

His wife is Rasa Bandzienė (née Kartanaitė, born 1961), chess player, three-time winner of the Lithuanian Women's Chess Championship and his mother-in-law was Marija Kartanaitė (1932-2017), chess player and trainer, ten-time winner of the Lithuanian Women's Chess Championship.
