= Henry Keizer =

Dutch businessman (1960–2019)

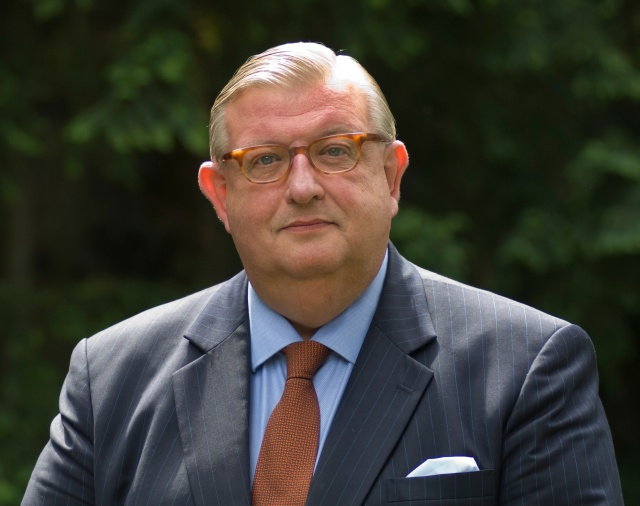
- Henry Keizer in 2014

Chairman of the People's Party for Freedom and Democracy
- In office 14 June 2014 – 18 May 2017
- Leader: Mark Rutte
- Preceded by: Benk Korthals

Personal details
- Born: Judicus Marinus Henricus Jacobus Keizer; 4 November 1960 Amsterdam, Netherlands
- Died: 5 October 2019 (aged 58) The Hague, Netherlands
- Party: People's Party for Freedom and Democracy (from 1983)
- Occupation: Businessman; Corporate director

Judicus Marinus Henricus Jacobus "Henry" Keizer (4 November 1960 – 5 October 2019) was a Dutch businessman who served as Chairman of the People's Party for Freedom and Democracy, the leading political party in the Netherlands.

Keizer was elected on 14 June 2014. On 26 May 2015, Keizer stated that the Netherlands should introduce an electoral threshold. He also declared that he would make integrity a central theme.

In April 2017 the Dutch platform for investigative journalism Follow the Money (FTM) published an article that accused Henry Keizer and three partners claiming that they had unfairly enriched themselves by buying an enterprise at a price that was below the actual value. It was also claimed that there was a conflict of interest, as Keizer was also an advisor to the sellers. Keizer denied the allegations and stated that they had done nothing wrong and claimed that the take-over was based on independent audit reports. The former owners of the company officially supported this statement.

His party for the time being decided not to consult its Integrity Committee. Later on at the request of Keizer the Integrity Committee of the VVD did start an investigation. Pending the results he decided to temporarily suspend his duties as president of the VVD.

On 15 May 2017 Pieter Lakeman of the Dutch Foundation for Research Business Information (SOBI) filed a complaint against Keizer and his partners at the prosecutor's office. SOBI at the same time also filed a disciplinary complaint against the external auditor of the company at the Disciplinary Court for Accountants (Dutch Accountantskamer).

On 18 May 2017 Keizer stepped down as Party Chairman. At the Party Congress later that year Christianne van der Wal was elected as his successor.

On 29 January 2018, the Dutch ‘Accountantskamer’ ruled and rejected all complaints and accusations against the accountant made by SOBI.

On 2 July 2019, the Dutch Ministry of Justice and the Fiscal Intelligence and Investigations Service conducted warranted home searches at Keizer's house and four other locations for racketeering and fraud. Assets were seized for a sum of €20 million, after the Fiscal Revenue Service already had filed an additional fiscal revenue claim of €12 million.

Party political offices
Preceded by Benk Korthals	Chairman of the People's Party for Freedom and Democracy; 2014–2017
