= Marjana =

Marjana (Cyrillic: Марјана) is a feminine given name. It could refer to:

- Marjana Bremec Homar (born 1946), Slovenian basketball player
- Marjana Chowdhury (born 1993), Bangladeshi-American model, actress, and beauty queen
- Marjana Gaponenko (born 1981), Ukrainian-German writer
- Marjana Ivanova-Jevsejeva (born 1982), Latvian politician
- Marjana Lipovšek (born 1946), Slovenian opera singer
- Marjana Lubej (born 1945), Slovenian sprinter
- Marjana Maraš (born 1970), Serbian politician
- Marjana Naceva (born 1994), Macedonian footballer

== See also ==
- Mirjana, a South Slavic feminine given name
- Marijana, a South Slavic feminine given name
- Marjan (name)
