= Rista Marjanović =

Serbian photojournalist

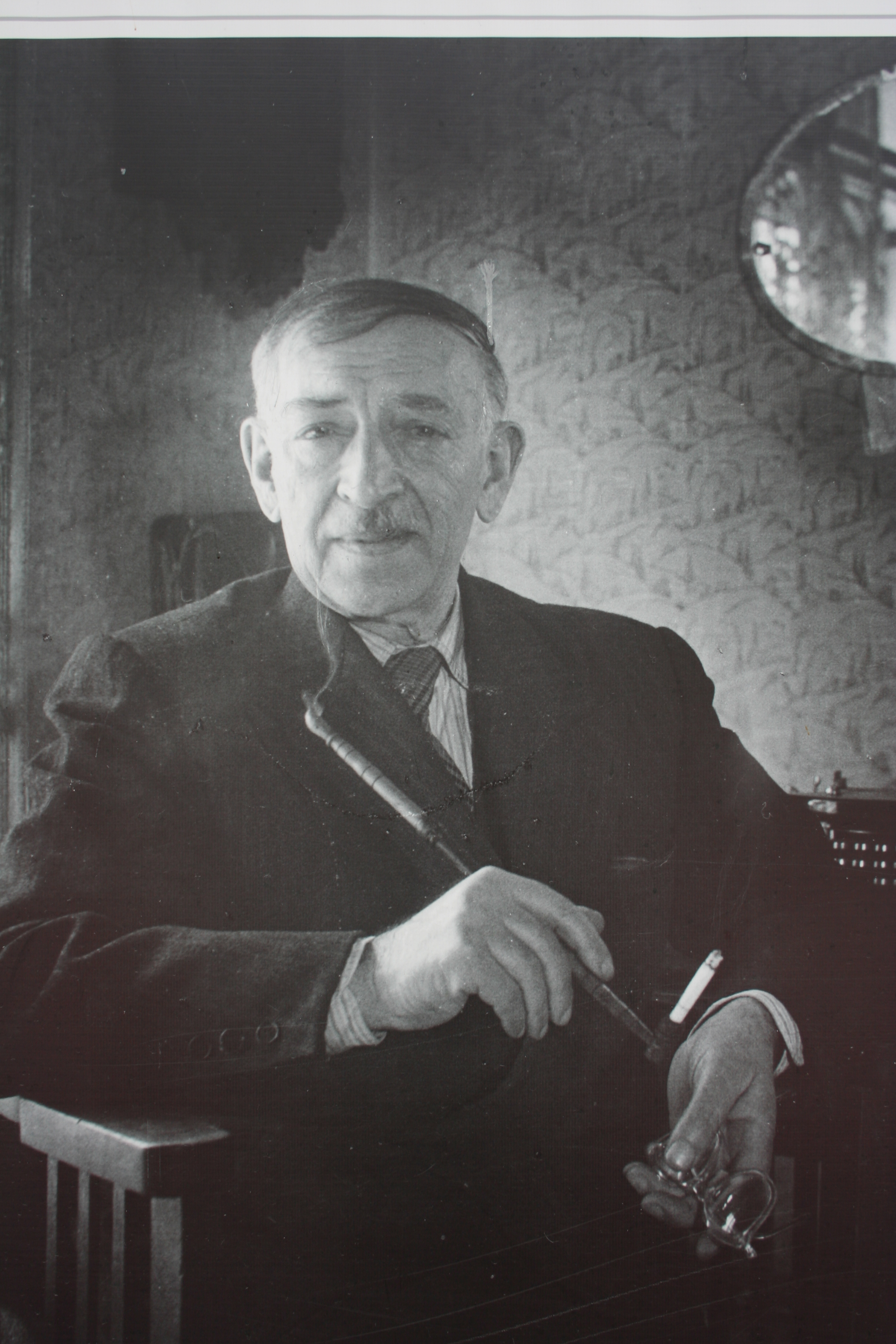
Rista Marjanović

Rista Marjanović (1 March 1885 in Šabac, Kingdom of Serbia – 7 April 1969 in Belgrade, Yugoslavia), the first Serbian photo-reporter, author of photographs from the Balkan Wars, World War I and World War II.

== Biography ==
He was the son of a prosperous grain merchant Dragojlo Marjanović, originally from Radenković in the Sremska Mitrovica municipality. He had an older brother, Dušan (1882–1958), a professor of mathematics, and a younger brother Kosta, a pharmacist.

In his native Šabac, he attended primary and secondary schools. He learned the art of photography at the Photographic Studio of Milan Jovanović from Milan Jovanović in Belgrade, where he also attended the Kiril Kutlik's Serbian School of Drawing and Painting.

Prior to the First Balkan War of 1912, he worked as an illustrations editor at the European edition of the American New York Herald, based in Paris. He took a leave of absence from his job in order to return to Serbia and document the First Balkan War. During World War I, he recorded battles of Cer, Kolubara, and others, followed by the great retreat of the Serbian army through Albania. In 1915, the Supreme Command sent him to France, where he published battlefield footage. At the 1916 Paris War Photography Exhibition, he displayed his paintings, which were later shown in the United Kingdom and the United States. On the Thessaloniki Front, he was again tasked with recording and reporting from the battlefield.

After World War I, he was employed by Avala news agency, the central press bureau, and the foreign affairs press department.

In 1941, he refused to cooperate with the Germans and continued to record on film in secret. In October 1944, he recorded the entry of the Red Army and the partisans in Belgrade, marking the end of the Kingdom of Yugoslavia and free elections.

After World War II he worked at the Tanjug news agency.

In 2019, a documentary was made about him: Rado ide Srbin u vojnike (Gladly a Serb goes soldiering).
