= Marjan Nazghlich =

Iranian politician (born 1974)

Marjan Nazghlich, born in 1974, was an Iranian Governor who died in the 2015 Mina disaster. She obtained bachelor's degrees in both educational sciences and judicial rights, and became the third female Governor of Iran and the first for Golestan province.

== Death ==
On the morning of September 24, 2015, which coincided with Eid Al-Adha, Nazghlich was caught in a crush of pilgrims along one of the main routes from Mina to Jamarat that resulted in thousands of injuries and deaths. During the stampede, while attempting to help injured pilgrims, Nazghlich fell and was trampled. She was taken to a hospital, where she died.
