= Marja van der Tas =

Dutch politician and management consultant

M. A. J. "Marja" van der Tas (born 14 June 1958) is a Dutch politician and former management consultant. From 1 February 2011 to 31 August 2016, she was mayor of Steenwijkerland. She was acting mayor of Bronckhorst between 2024 and 2025. From 1998 to 2006, she was an alderman of Apeldoorn.

== Career ==
Van der Tas was born in Alkmaar. She studied domestic science at Wageningen University and sociology of the Western world and Dutch law at Utrecht University. She worked in the field of public and senior housing and as an independent advisor for government and nonprofit organizations.

Between 1998 and 2006 Van der Tas was alderman of Apeldoorn. On 1 February 2011 she became mayor of Steenwijkerland. She served until 31 August 2016. At the founding of the Ecologische Autoriteit in September 2022 Van der Tas became interim chairperson. On 1 January 2024 Van der Tas becaming acting mayor of Bronckhorst, succeeding Marianne Besselink. On 13 January 2025 she was succeeded by Patrick van Domburg.

Van der Tas is a member of the Christian Democratic Appeal (Christen-Democratisch Appèl). She is married and has three children. She is a member of the Protestant Church in the Netherlands and used to be president of a local church council in Apeldoorn.
