= Marijana Savić =

Marijana Savić (Serbian: Маријана Савић) is a Serbian women's and human rights activist. She is the founder and Executive Director of the NGO Atina, working with victims of trafficking, sexual abuse, discrimination, violence and labor exploitation in Serbia.

== Life ==
Savić was born in Yugoslavia, in what is today Serbia. Her experience from the breakup of Yugoslavia in the 1990s has made her committed to ending violence. During the 1990s she took part in rallies for peace, and at the turn of the millennium, women's rights and LGBTQ rights.

In 2004 she founded an organization called Atina in Serbia, "Association of Citizens to Combat Human Trafficking and all Forms of Gender-Based Violence". As part of the work of the association, she established the first shelter for trafficking survivors in the country. Savic has also worked as a consultant for state governments and international NGOs, on how to include trafficking victims in human rights policy. Her work has been highlighted by actors such as Forbes, UNFPA and Al Jazeera.

She has a law degree from the University of Podgorica.
