= Emilis Šlekys =

Lithuanian chess player (1951–2012)

Personal information
- Born: 6 August 1951 Pabiržė, Lithuania
- Died: 30 October 2012 (aged 61)

Chess career
- Country: Lithuania
- Title: ICCF International Master (IM)

Emilis Šlekys (6 August 1951 – 30 October 2012) was a Lithuanian chess player who holds the titles of ICCF International Master (IM). He was winner of Lithuanian Chess Championship (1985).

== Biography ==
Emilis Šlekys was a multiple participant of the Lithuanian Chess Championships, in which he won two medals: gold (1985, together with Algirdas Bandza) and bronze (1996).

In 1973, Šlekys won Lithuanian Sports Association Nemunas Chess Championship. Also he was three-time chess champion of the city of Biržai (1968, 1969 and 1971).

Since 1980s, Šlekys has been active participated in correspondence chess tournaments. As team member of the Lithuanian team, he won the 7th USSR Team Correspondence Championship (1981–1984) with best result on the 5th board. In the next USSR Team Correspondence Championship (1984—1987), Šlekys won a silver medal with the team. His main achievements are silver medal of the 12th Correspondence Chess Olympiad (1998–2004) with Lithuania team. He was awarded the ICCF International Correspondence Chess Master (IM) title.

Since 1975, Šlekys worked as a coach at the Vilnius chess and draughts school. Since 1987 he has been the director of this school.

In 2011, Šlekys was awarded a large gold medal by the Lithuanian Department of Physical Culture and Sports.
