= Marjan Bolhar =

Slovenian athlete

Personal information
- Nicknames: Brus (firefighter nickname), also Marjanček, Hajuc
- Nationality: Slovenian
- Occupation: firefighter
- Height: 176 cm (5 ft 9 in)
- Weight: 82 kg (181 lb)
- Website: https://marjanbolhar.si

Sport
- Country: Slovenia
- Sport: kickbox, aikido, boxing
- Weight class: –75 kg, −79 kg, −84 kg
- Club: Klub borilnih veščin Domžale
- Coached by: Janez Gale (until 2006)
Medal record
Boxing Competitions
Gold medal – first place	Best Junior Athlete	–
Gold medal – first place	SLO. National Champ. -75 kg	2003
Gold medal – first place	SLO Iron Fist	2003
Gold medal – first place	SLO Golden Belt	2003
Gold medal – first place	SLO National Champ. -75 kg	2004
Gold medal – first place	SLO Iron Fist	2004
Gold medal – first place	SLO Golden Belt	2004
Kickbox
Representing Slovenia
Event / 1st / 2nd / 3rd; SLO nationals / 15 / – / –
Kickboxing Competitions
Silver medal – second place	WAKO Wold Cup Ireland	2006
Gold medal – first place	WAKO Best fighter Italy	2011
Gold medal – first place	Balkan Championship Serbia	2011
Gold medal – first place	WAKO EU Cup Italy	2011
Gold medal – first place	WAKO EU Cup Serbia	2013
Gold medal – first place	WAKO EU Cup Italy	2013
Bronze medal – third place	WAKO World Cup Turkey	2013
Gold medal – first place	WAKO American Cup Canada	2014
Gold medal – first place	WAKO American Cup Canada	2015
Silver medal – second place	WAKO World Cup Ireland	2015
Bronze medal – third place	WAKO Svetovni Cup Serbia	2015
Silver medal – second place	WAKO EU Cup Italy	2016
Bronze medal – third place	WAKO World Cup USA	2016
Gold medal – first place	WAKO EU Cup Croatia	2018
Gold medal – first place	WAKO Oceanian Cup	2018
Gold medal – first place	WAKO Oceanian Cup	2019

Marjan Bolhar (born 17 November 1976) is a Slovenian athlete and professional firefighter.

== Personal life ==
=== Early life ===
Marjan was born on 17 November 1976 in Ljubljana (Slovenia). He spent most of his childhood in the village of Češenik (Domžale).

=== Career and volunteering ===
Marjan became a firefighter early in his youth when he was serving as a firefighter volunteer in PGD Dob, where he is also currently in service. He later became a professional firefighter, working as a second-level fire officer. He is also helping as a firefighter volunteer at "Industrijsko društvo Helios". Besides being a firefighter, he is also the founder and the main martial arts coach at "Klub borilnih veščin Domžale". He is also coaching as a volunteer at the primary school for children with special needs "Osnovna šola Roje", at the retirement home Domžale and at the health and wellbeing foundation "Šola zdravja Domžale".

== Sports career ==
Marjan's sports career started quite early. He achieved his first noticeable results in boxing when he was 15 years old and was selected as the best junior Slovenian boxer. After a few years of competing as an amateur boxer, he switched to kickboxing, where he was able to achieve quite a few important results on the international stage. Until 2006, Marjan was coached by a well-known Slovenian boxer and author, Janez Gale. As of 2022, Marjan is also the only remaining Janez Gale-trained athlete who is still active. Marjan participated in more than 300 different matches during his lengthy career.

During the WAKO Oceania Open cup 2018, Marjan met the famous bodybuilder, actor, and politician Arnold Schwarzenegger. Arnold invited him to compete at the 2020 World's Strongest Firefighter event in Santa Monica (California, US).

During his sports career, Marjan had quite a few knee-related injuries. He was able to overcome them and continue with the competitions.

=== Diplomas, licences and ranks ===
In his sports career, Marjan achieved the following titles by teaching and training various sports:

- Boxing – licensed coach
- Kickboxing – licensed coach
- Kickboxing – martial arts master, 4th dan
- Aikido – martial arts master, 1st dan

=== Other recognition ===
- 2013 – Best male sportsperson – Municipality of Domžale
- 2015 – Best male sportsperson – Municipality of Domžale
- Recognition for many years of work and outstanding achievements of the Association of Professional Firefighters of Slovenia
- 2013 – WAKO Best Fighter Special Trophy (Antalya, Turkey)
- 2014 – Silver plaque of the Slovenian Olympic Committee for outstanding achievements
- 2014 – Special recognition of the Municipality of Domžale and the Institute for Sport and Recreation of Domžale
- 2014 -Special recognition of the Municipality of Domžale and the Institute for Sport and Recreation of Domžale
- 2016 – Silver plaque of the Slovenian Olympic Committee for outstanding achievements
- 2021 – Recognition of the Municipality of Domžale for special achievements for 28 years of competitions and 21 years of coaching

=== Boxing ===
Achievements as an amateur boxer:

- Best Junior Athlete (Slovenia)
- 2003 – Slovenian National Champion −75 kg category
- 2003 – Slovenian Iron Fist
- 2003 – Slovenian Golden Belt
- 2004 – Slovenian National Champion – 75 kg category
- 2004 – Slovenian Iron Fist
- 2004 – Slovenian Golden Belt

=== Kickboxing ===
In a sports career lasting more than a decade, Marjan achieved resounding results on three continents – Europe, North America and Australia. At the same time, he was also a multiple-time Slovenian kickboxing national champion and a member of the Slovenian kickboxing team.

Achievements as a kickboxer:

- večkratni (15x) državni prvak (Slovenija)
- 2006 – WAKO World Cup (Dublin, Ireland), 2nd place
- 2011 – Balkan Championship (Belgrade, Serbia), 1st place
- 2011 – WAKO World Cup "Best fighter" (Rimini, Italy), 1st place
- 2011 – WAKO European Cup (Italy), 1st place
- 2013 – WAKO European Cup (Belgrade), 1st place
- 2013 – WAKO European Cup (Turin, Italy), 1st place
- 2013 - WAKO World Cup (Antalya, Turkey), 3rd place
- 2014 – WAKO American Open Championship (Toronto, Canada), 1st place
- 2015 – WAKO American Open Championship (Toronto, Canada), 1st place
- 2015 – WAKO World Cup (Dublin, Ireland), 2nd place
- 2015 – WAKO World Cup (Belgrade), 3rd place
- 2016 – WAKO European Cup (Mareno di Piave, Italy), 2nd place
- 2016 – WAKO World Cup (Las Vegas, Nevada, US), 3rd place
- 2018 – WAKO European Cup (Makarska, Croatia), 1st place
- 2018 – WAKO Oceania Open Championship (Melbourne), 1st place
- 2019 – WAKO Oceania Open Championship (Auckland, New Zealand), 1st place

By competing at the WAKO Oceania Open Championship 2019 in Auckland, Marjan also completed his kickboxing career.

=== Firefighter competitions ===
- 2020 – Charity event for the California Firefighters (Santa Monica, California), where Marjan competed in the lineup of the 10 best professional firefighters, as the only European. He competed against 8 Americans and 1 Canadian.
