= Marija Kartanaitė =

Lithuanian chess player (1932–2017)

Personal information
- Born: 10 January 1932 Raguva, Panevėžys District Municipality, Lithuania
- Died: 17 December 2017 (aged 85) Vilnius, Lithuania

Chess career
- Country: Lithuania

Marija Kartanaitė (10 January 1932 – 17 December 2017) was a Lithuanian chess player. She was ten times winner of Lithuanian Women's Chess Championship (1956, 1957, 1958, 1963, 1964, 1966, 1967, 1969, 1970, 1980).

== Biography ==
Marija Kartanaitė was a teacher by profession. She worked in Lithuanian schoolchildren and youth center, before that - in the Vilnius pioneers' palace - she trained several generations of chess players.

Marija Kartanaitė in Lithuanian Women's Chess Championships won 20 medals: she was Lithuanian champion 10 times (1956, 1957, 1958, 1963, 1964, 1966, 1967, 1969, 1970, 1980), won silver medal 9 times (1953, 1954, 1955, 1959, 1961, 1968, 1976, 1978, 1979) and once - a bronze medal (1977).

In 1971 and 1972, Marija Kartanaitė won the Soviet Rural Society Women's Chess Championships. in 1973 in Brno she won gold at the Eastern Europe Women's Chess Championship of village associations. In the World Lithuanian Sports Games she won Women's Chess tournaments in 1995 and 1998. In 2012 August Marija Kartanaitė participated in the European Senior Chess Championship in Kaunas.

Her daughter Rasa Bandzienė (born 1961) followed in her mother's footsteps and won the Lithuanian Women's Chess Championship three times. Son-in-law Algirdas Bandza is an international chess master.

== Awards ==
- Sports Cross of Honor (on the occasion of the 80th anniversary for a significant contribution to the development of chess sport in Lithuania), 2012
