= Marjan Smit =

Dutch softball player (born 1975)

Marjan Smit (born September 29, 1975, in Breda) is a Dutch softball player, who represented the Dutch national team in international competitions.

Smit played for Twins Sport Club, Zwijndrecht and since 2004 she was back at the Twins. She is an outfielder and second baseman who bats and throws right-handed. She competes for the Dutch national team since 1999. In 2002 she stole the most bases in the Dutch Softball Hoofdklasse. She was part of the Dutch team for the 2008 Summer Olympics in Beijing.
