= Židikai =

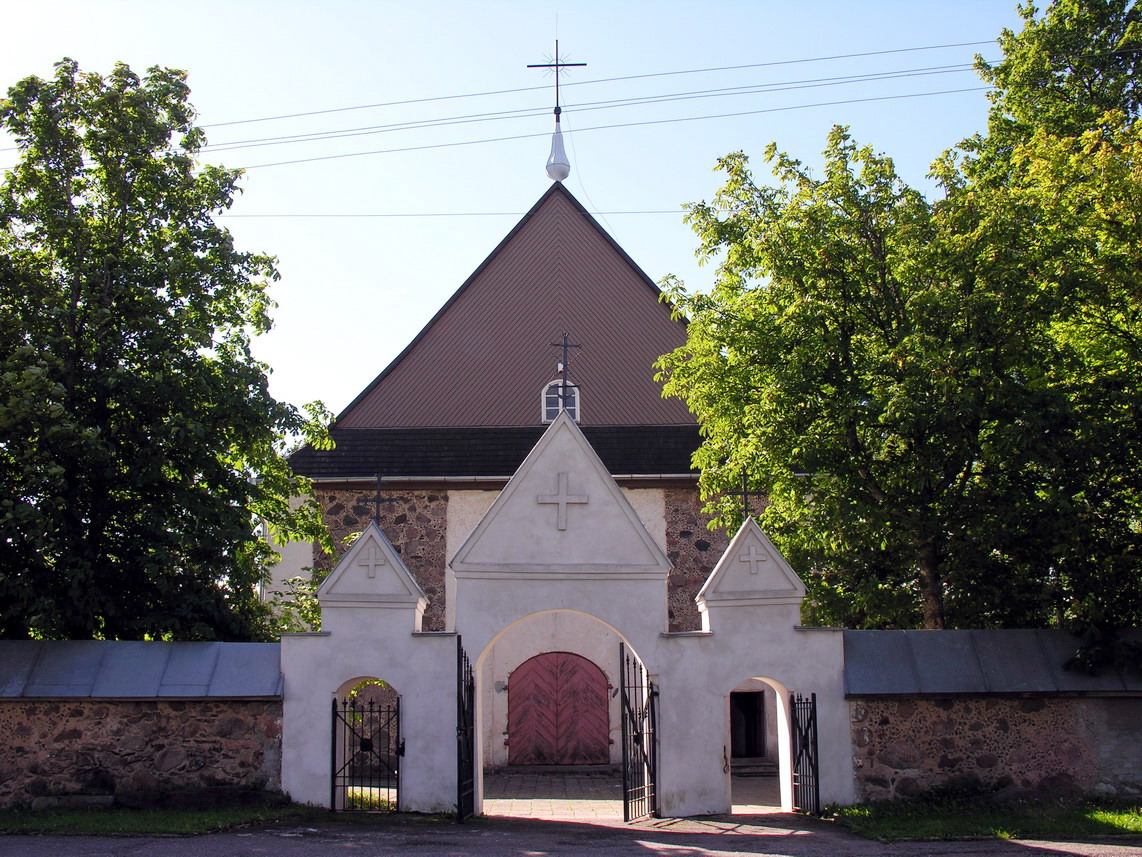
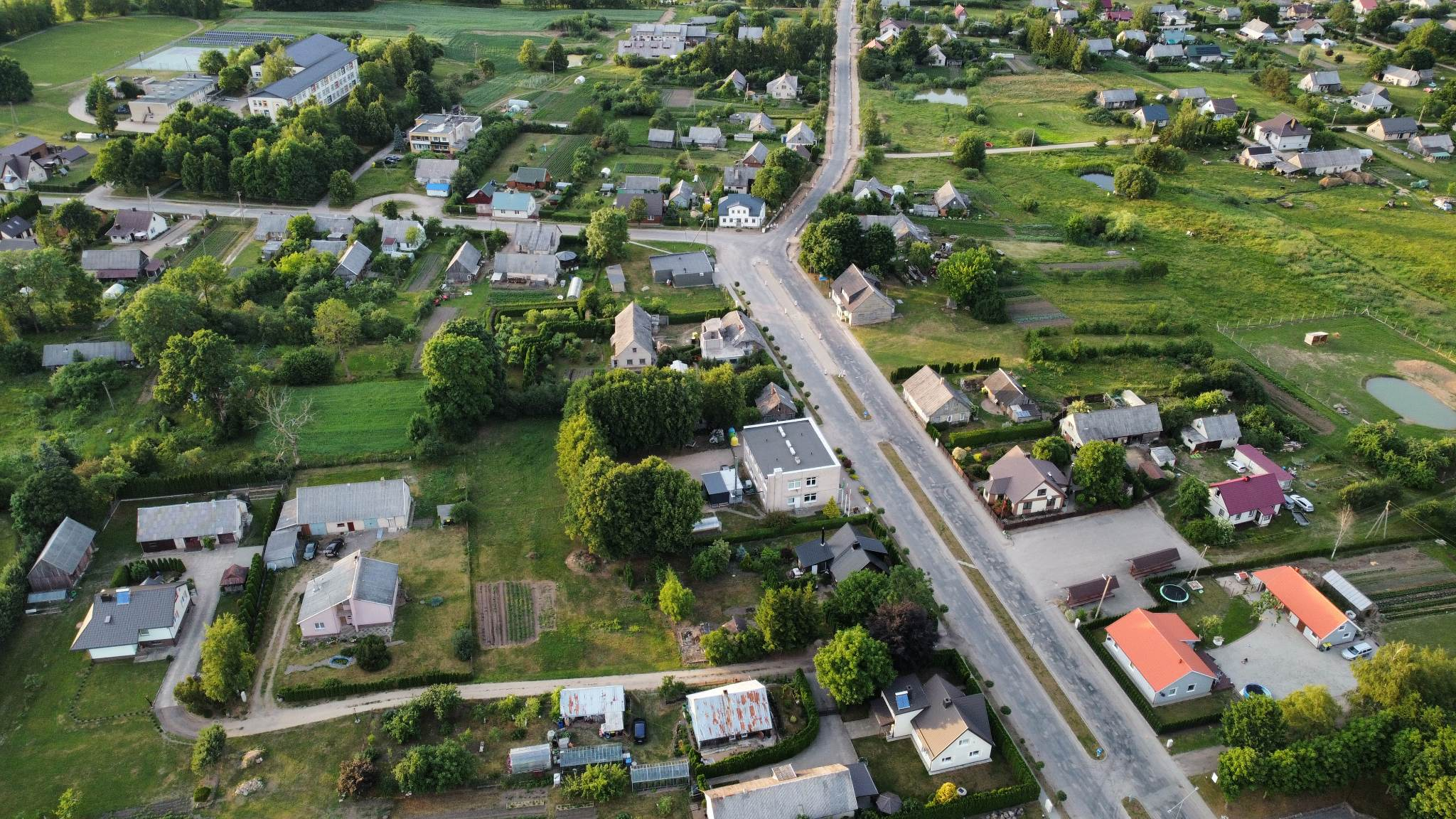
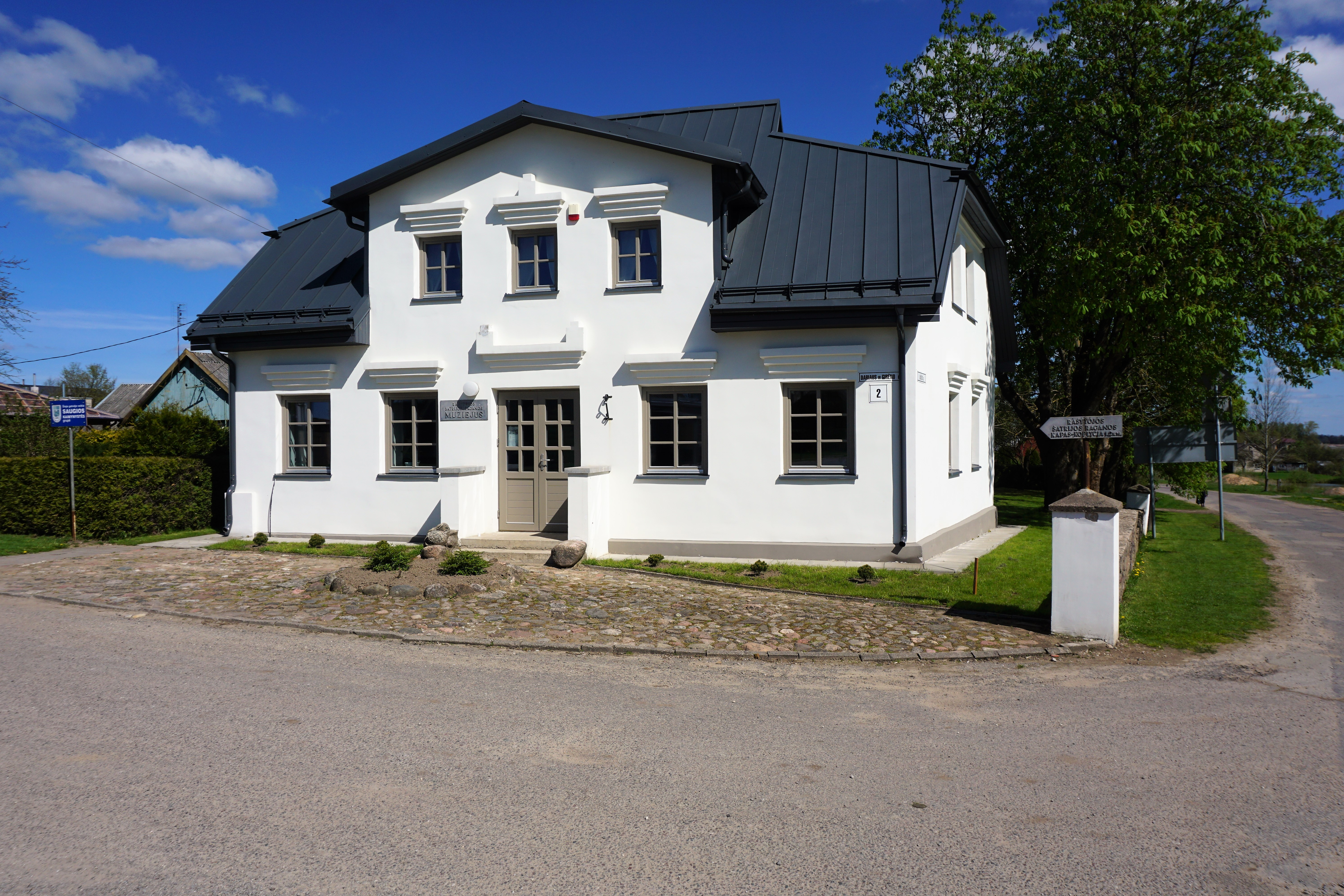
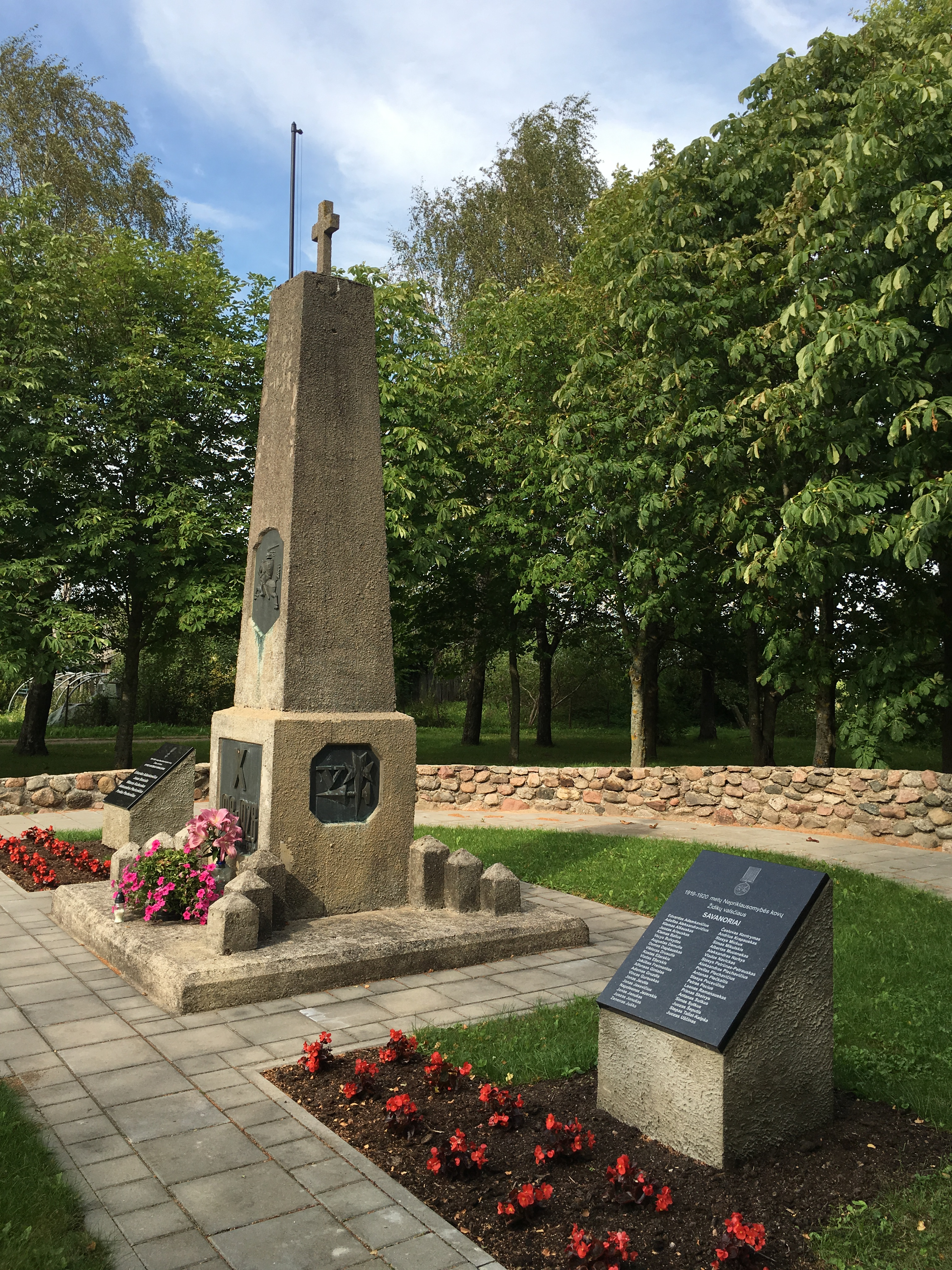
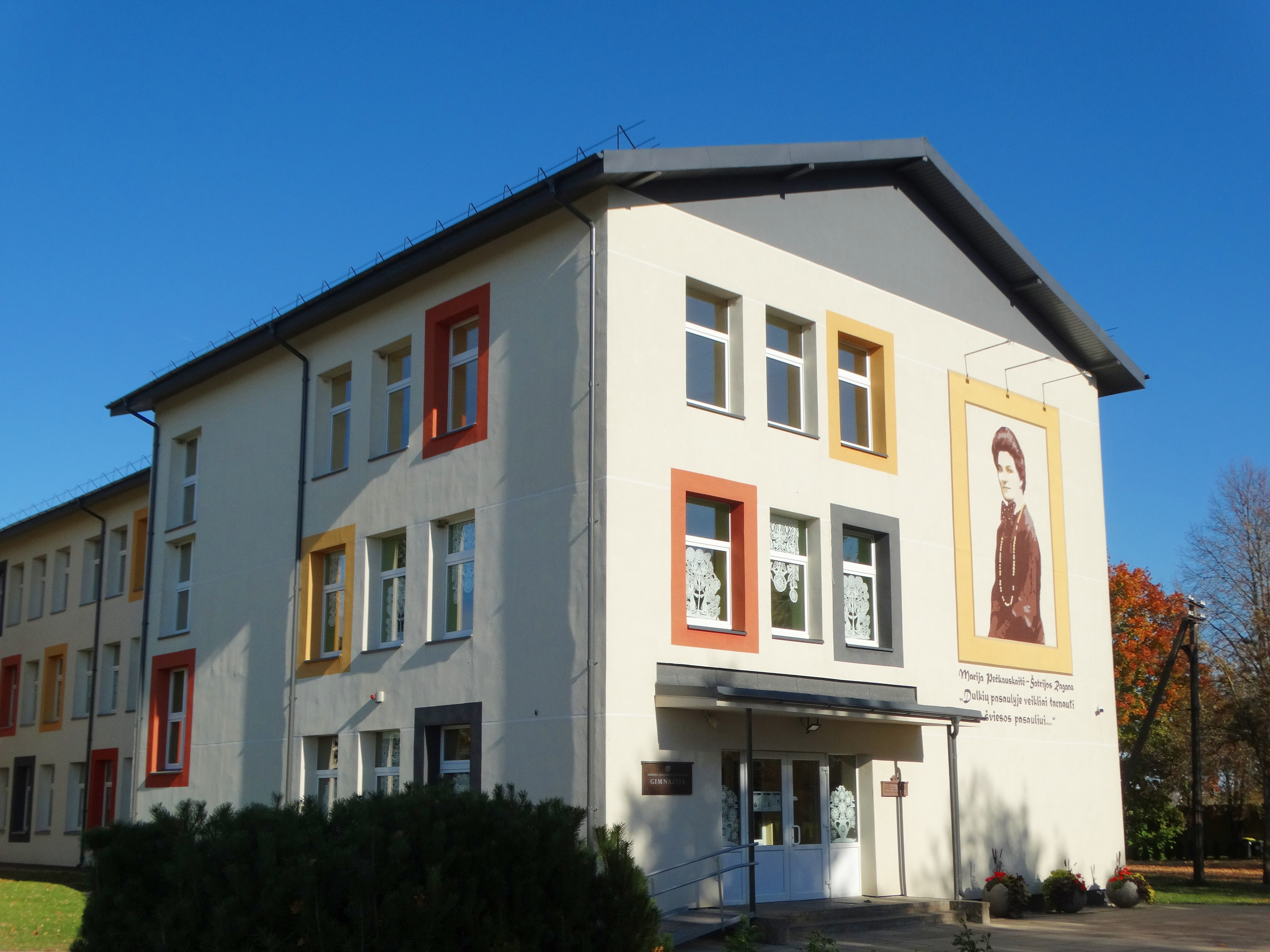
- Church of St. John the Baptist, Židikai Birdview of Židikai main street Museum of Šatrijos Ragana Monument of Independence Gymnasium of Marija Pečkauskaitė

- Location of Židikai
- Coordinates: 56°19′N 22°01′E
- Country: Lithuania
- Ethnographic region: Samogitia
- County: Telšiai County
- Municipality: Mažeikiai district municipality
- Elderate: Židikai elderate
- Capital of: Židikai elderate
- First mentioned: 1568

Population (2011)
  - Total: 440
- Time zone: UTC+2 (EET)
  - Summer (DST): UTC+3 (EEST)

Židikai (Samogitian: Žėdėkā) is a town in Mažeikiai district municipality, Lithuania. It is located 21 km (13 mi) west of Mažeikiai. Židikai is the seat of Židikai elderate. Židikai is known for being the home of Marija Pečkauskaitė – Šatrijos Ragana, a famous Lithuanian writer (1877–1930) for the last 15 years of her lifetime.

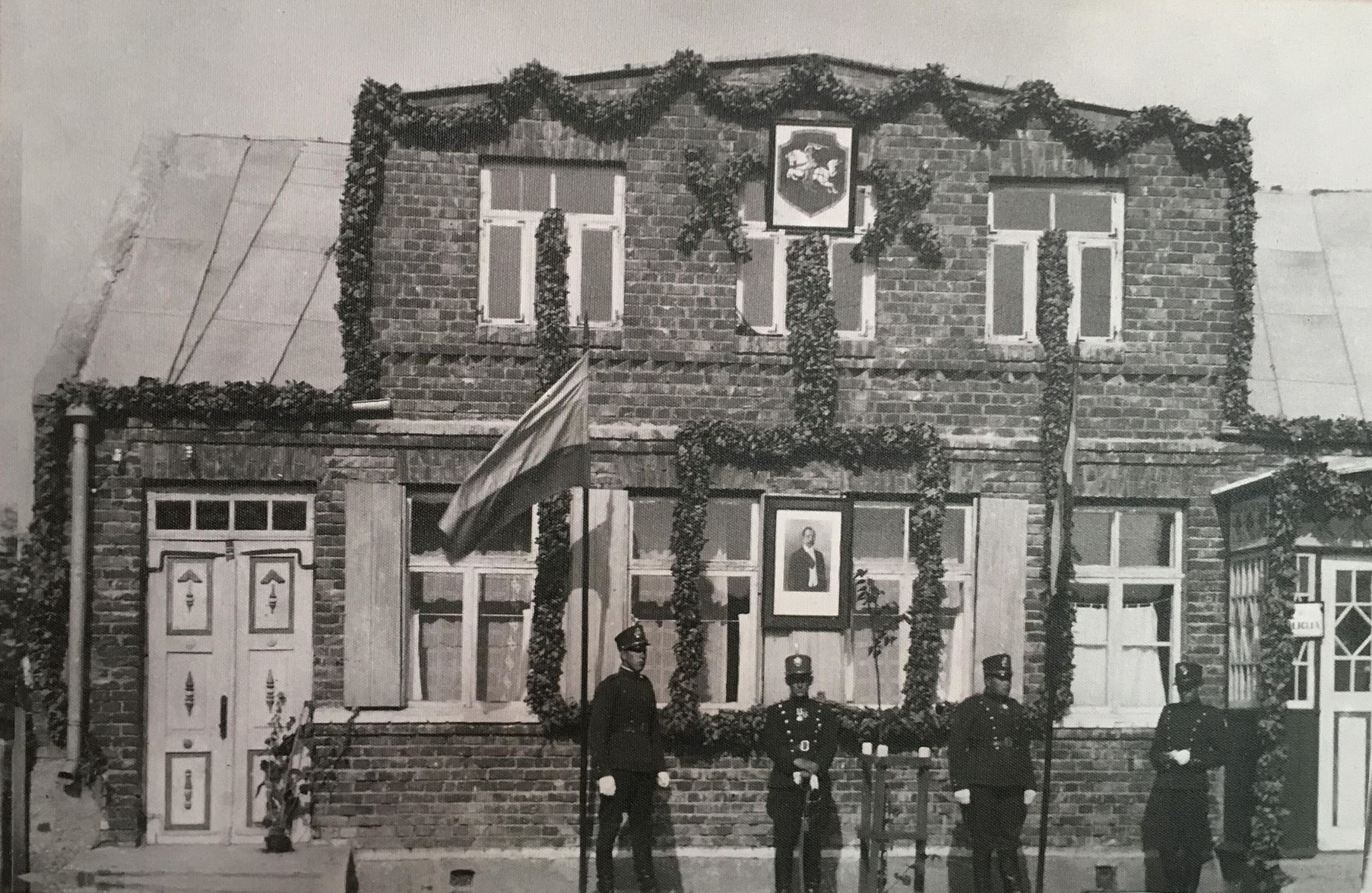
Židikai Police Office in 1938 (Collection of G. Januška)

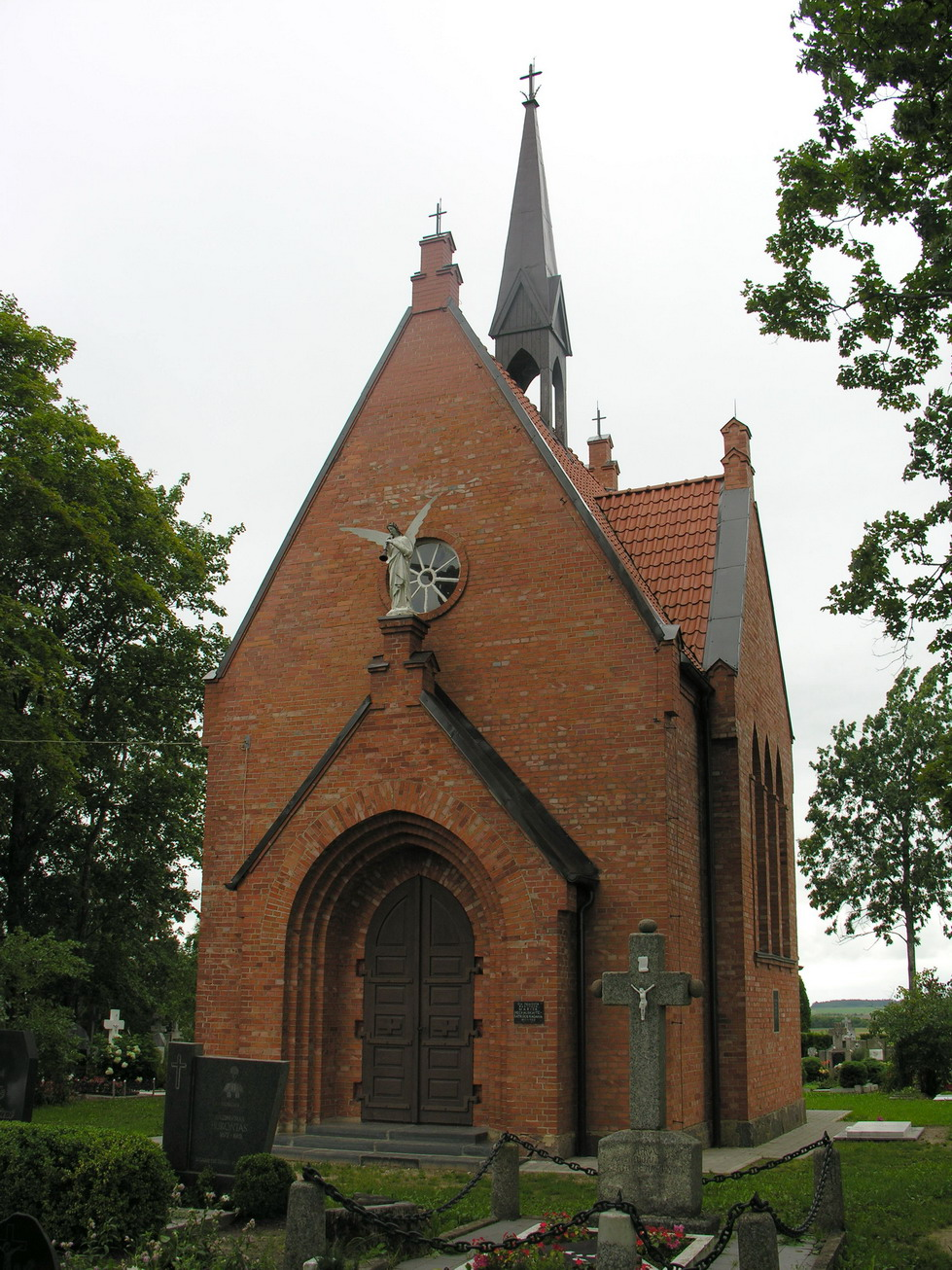
A chapel-grave of author Šatrijos Ragana

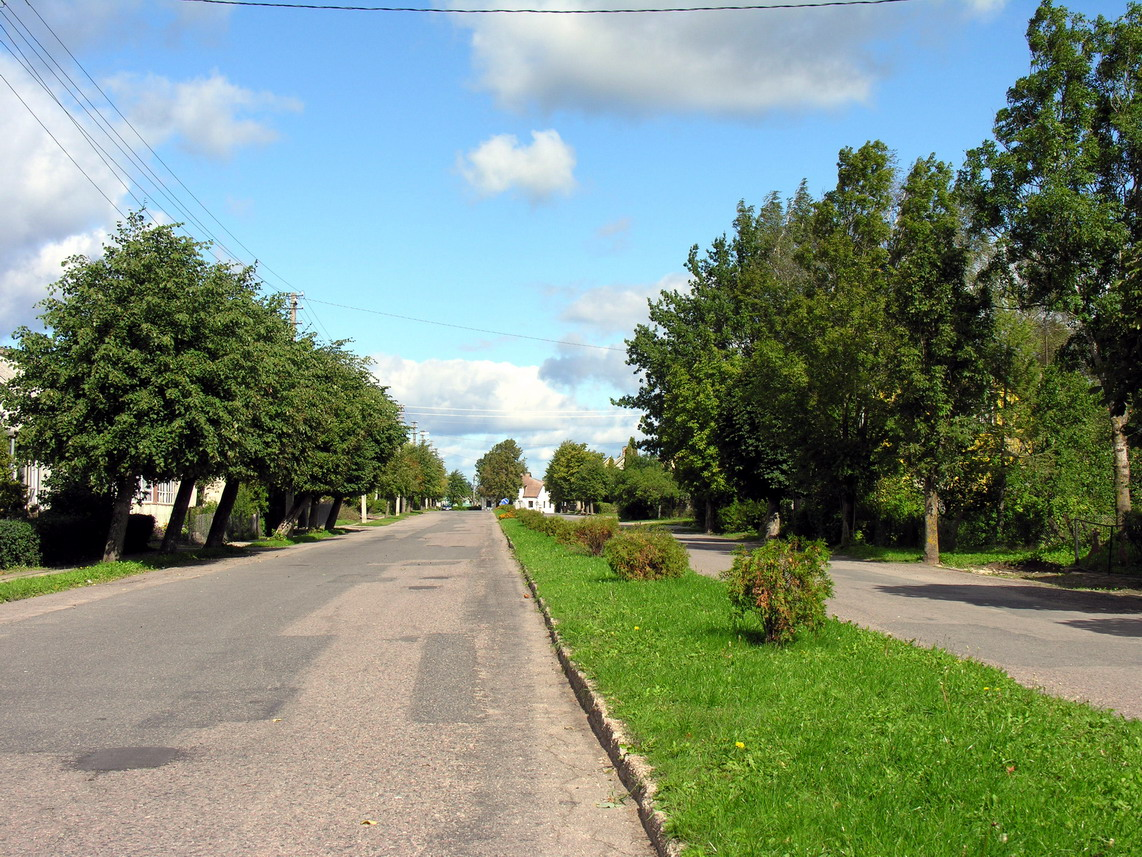
Marija Pečkauskaitė street, the main thoroughfare

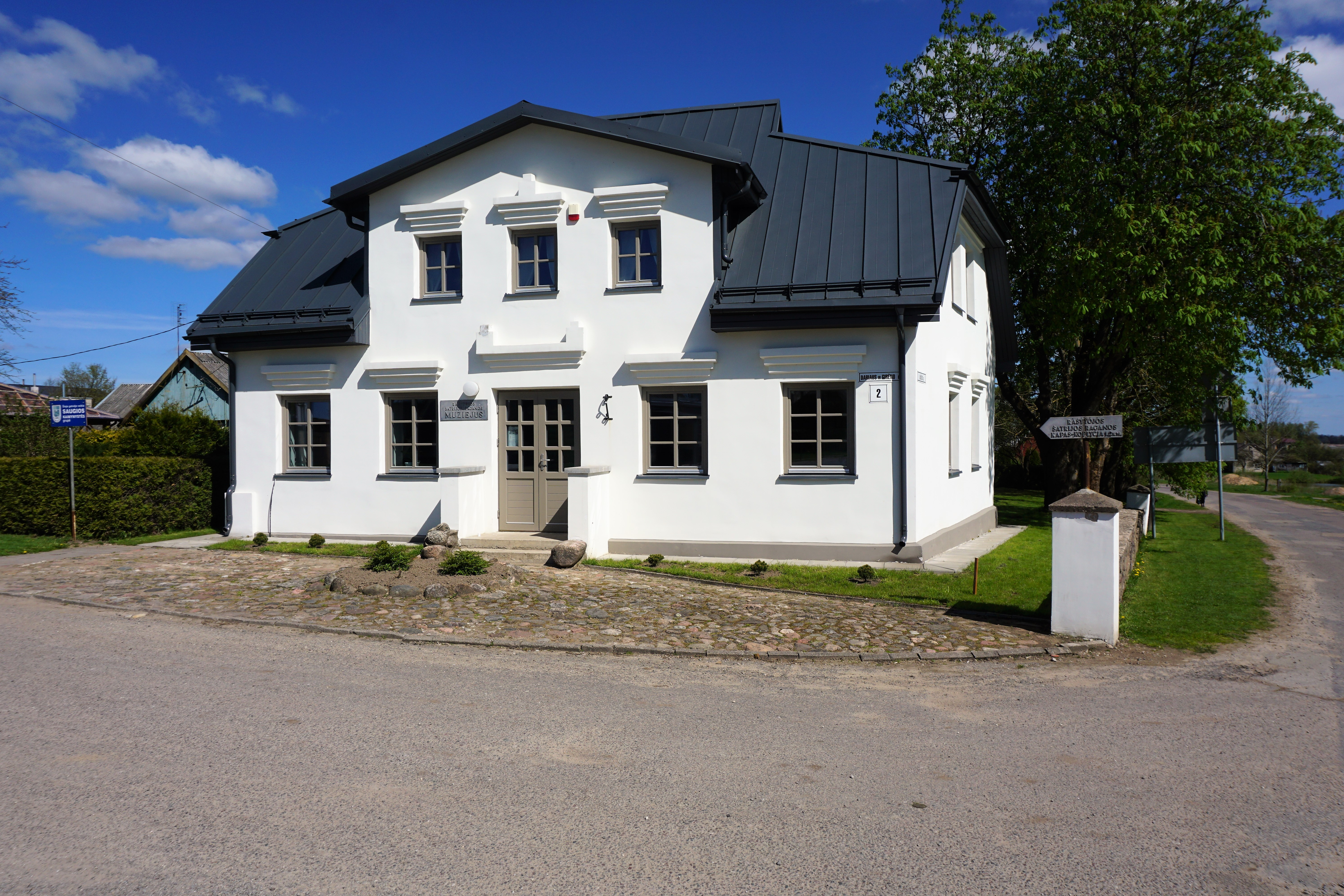
Memorial Museum of Šatrijos Ragana

== History ==
From 1614, Židikai was held by the Kražiai Jesuits. In 1659, during the Northern Wars, Swedish forces burnt down Židikai.

Between 1918 and 1939, when Lithuania was established as an independent state, Židikai prospered. It was both the center of a Catholic parish and the center of local governance. In the interwar period Židikai population reached nearly 1,000.

Before World War II, Židikai had an important Jewish community. According to the census of 1923, there were 893 residents in the shtetl, 799 being Jewish (89%). During the summer of 1941, hundreds of Jews were murdered in mass executions perpetrated by an einsatzgruppen of Germans and Lithuanian collaborators.

Economic activity in the village stalled. After the war, during the years of Soviet occupation, Židikai developed similarly to other small towns in Lithuania: in 1952, a hospital was established in the former parsonage; in 1954, a secondary school was established replacing the primary school; and in 1956, Židikai's Culture Center was founded. Židikai's population in 1959 was 429.

After the re-establishment of independence of Lithuania in 1990, Židikai became the seat of the Židikai elderate.

== Progress ==
Currently, there are three grocery shops, a gymnasium, a dispensary, a public library, a music school and a Culture center. Public parks were created in 2006 and 2008. In 2007, the President of the Republic of Lithuania approved a new coat of arms of Židikai. On 30 April 2010, a project to renovate the center of the town began. It was financed by the EU and Mažeikiai District Municipality's funds. During the project, the Nepriklausomybės and Turgaus squares as well as the buildings of the Culture center and Židikai elderate were renovated. The project was finished in 2012. Its value was LTL 731,677. The old town of Židikai is an urban monument with its street plan protected. The large Lithuanian company, ORLEN Lietuva has a presence in the Židikai eldership.

== Design ==
Židikai town has a radial layout, established from the time of the Wallach land reform of 1547. Conserved buildings are predominantly one or two floors high and date to the early 20th century. There are also post World War II and later 20th century buildings. The old part of Židikai is a monument of urbanistics, protected by the state.

== Culture ==
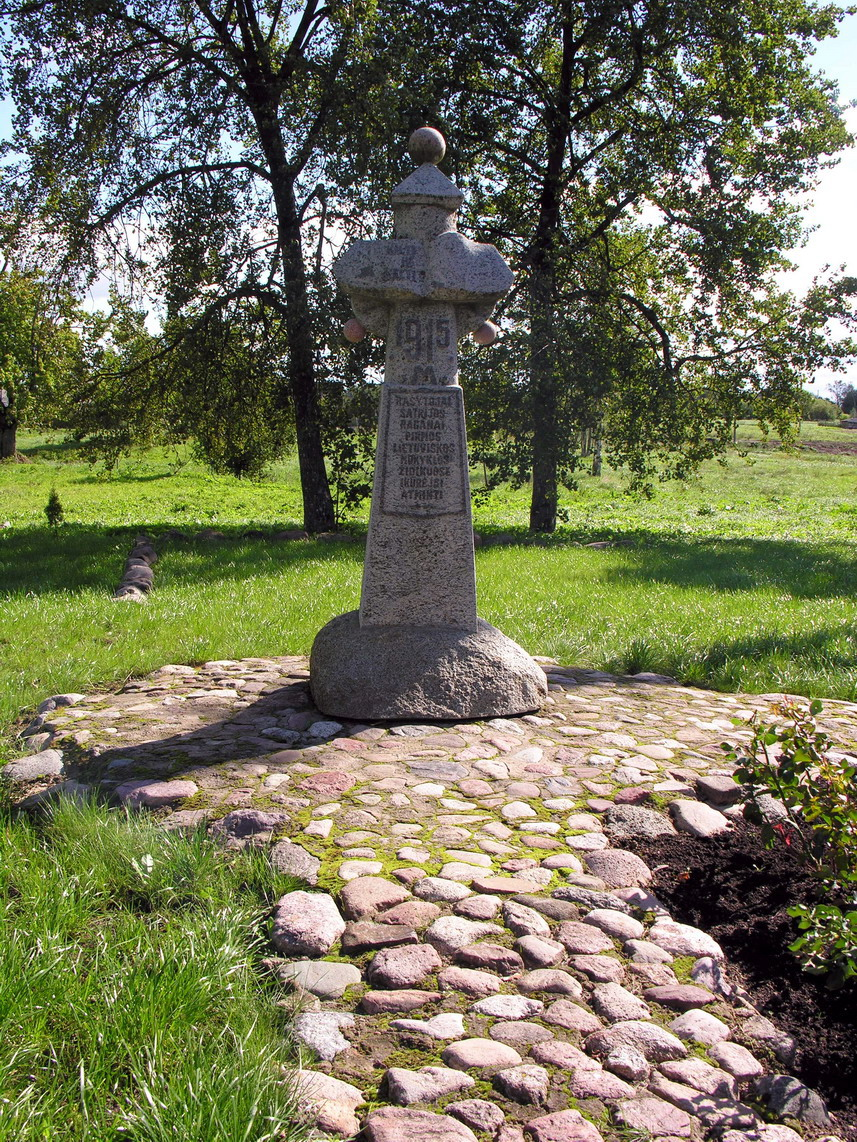
Monument for the remembrance of Šatrijos Ragana

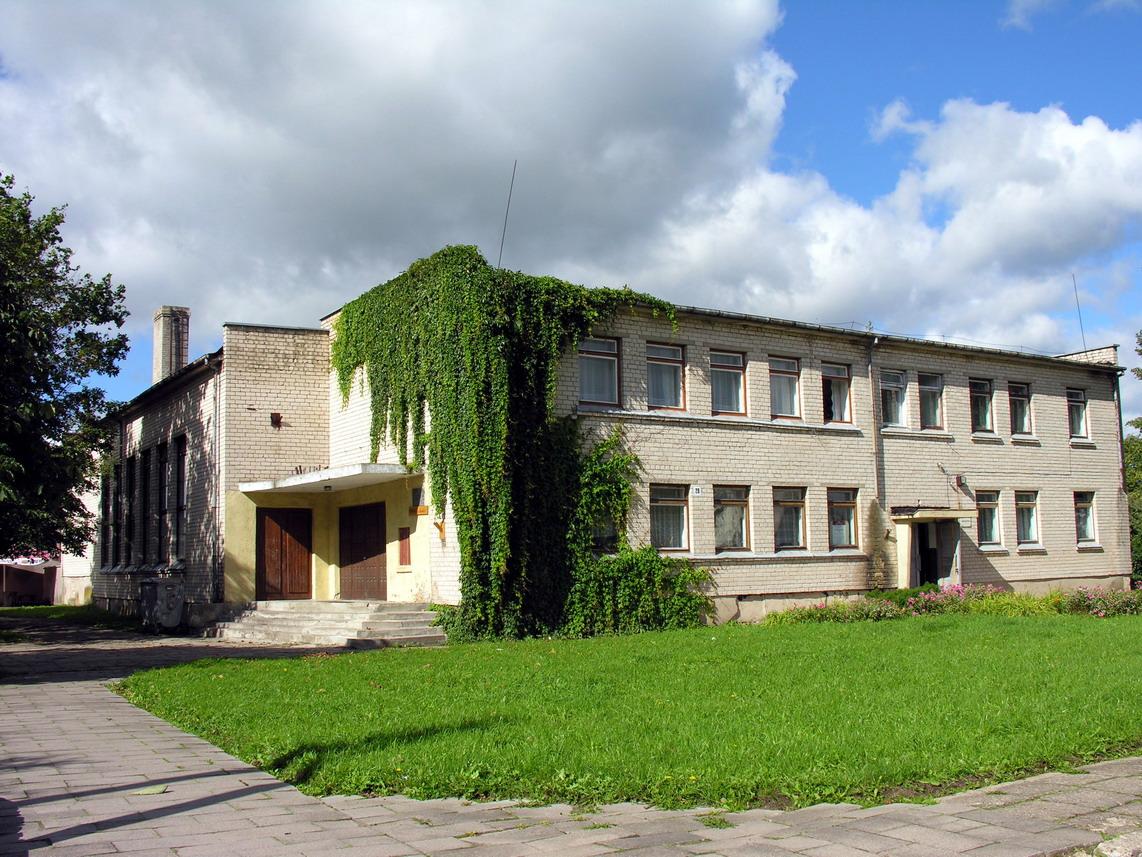
The cultural centre, library and music school building

Židikai is noted for its resident of 15 years, the author Šatrijos Ragana. In the center of Židikai, there is a museum dedicated to her . Its exhibits document both her childhood and youth as well as her later life in the town.

The Židikai Culture Centre encourages regional traditions and leisure activities for the youth and other residents of the town. The building of the Culture Centre was completed in 1967 with two halls: a larger hall with a capacity of 200 seats for large events, concerts, disco parties etc. and a smaller hall for events such as art exhibitions and board game tournaments.

Židikai public library was opened in 1939. In 2004, the library had about 9,000 documents and books in its possession. In 1994, the library moved to the new premises in the building of the Culture Centre (which is also home to the town's music school). The public library is a branch of Mažeikiai public library.

== Governance ==
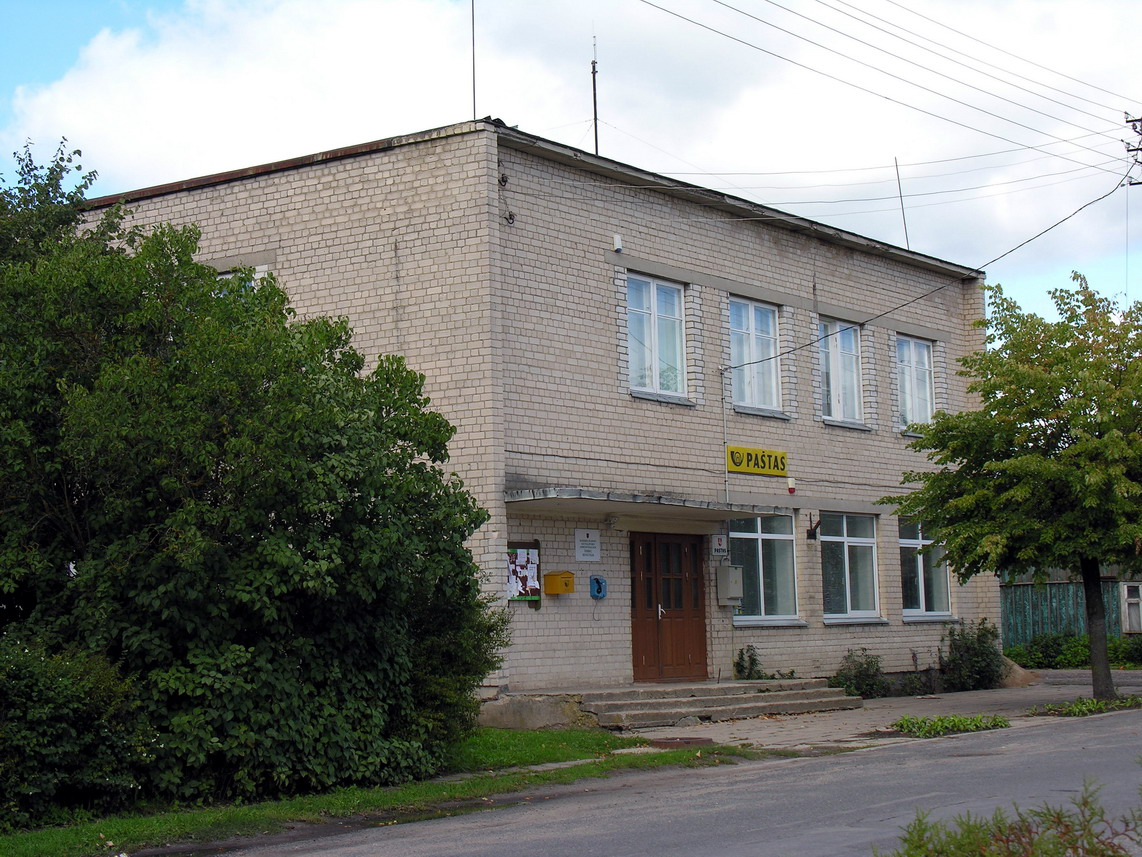
The Židikai eldership administrative building

Židikai is the center of Židikai eldership and the largest town within the eldership. The area of the eldership is 198 km^{2} (76.45 sq mi). The population density of the eldership is 3,044/km^{2} (7,880/sq mi). In 2009, five sub-elderships were established, one of which was located in Židikai itself.

== Education ==
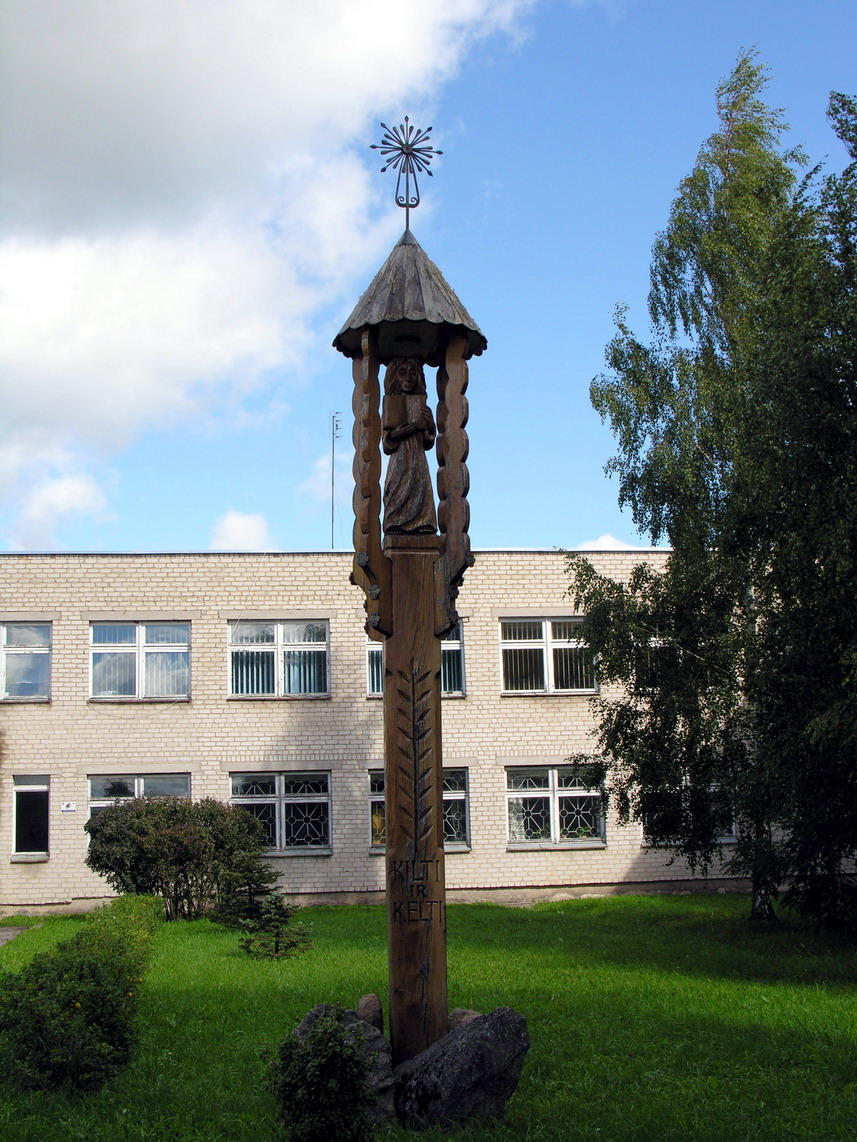
A roofed pole in the backyard of Židikai Marija Pečkauskaitė secondary school

The Židikai Marija Pečkauskaitė Gymnasium opened in 1865 and is the oldest school in the Mažeikiai District Municipality. In the town there is also a branch of the Mažeikiai music school which was founded in 1986. There, students have an opportunity to learn to play the piano, accordion, saxophone or guitar as well as to learn music theory and history. It is located in the Židikai Culture Centre.

== Religion ==
Židikai has one Roman Catholic church and one chapel (in the cemetery of the town). The first church in Židikai was built in 1636 by the Kražiai Jesuits who held the town from 1614. The parish of Židikai was established in 1853. The existing St. John the Baptist's church was built in 1821 and St. Ann's Chapel was built in 1941. The most important religious festival and the biggest festival of the town is Saint Ann's Feast celebrated annually during the last weekend of July. On the Sunday of the feast, Mass is celebrated in front of the cemetery chapel.

== Notable residents ==
- Marija Pečkauskaitė – Šatrijos Ragana (1877–1930), a Lithuanian author and educationalist, who lived in Židikai from 1915 until her death. She was buried in the Židikai cemetery.
- Alfonsas Bukontas (born 1941 Dapšiai, Židikai parish), a poet a translator who graduated from Židikai secondary school.
- Laimonas Inis (born 1938 near Židikai), an author, journalist and editor who graduated from Židikai secondary school.
- Klemas Inta (born 1941 near Židikai), a politician and signatory of the Act of the Re-Establishment of the State of Lithuania who graduated from Židikai secondary school.

== See also ==
- Židikai, Lithuania(Archive and memorial website for Židikai (Zhidik in Yiddish).
