= Marijana Krajnović =

Serbian politician

Marijana Krajnović (Serbian Cyrillic: Маријана Крајновић; born 1988), formerly known as Marijana Milnović (Serbian Cyrillic: Маријана Милновић), is a politician in Serbia. She was elected to the National Assembly of Serbia in the 2020 parliamentary election as a member of the Serbian Progressive Party.

== Private career ==
Krajnović has a bachelor's degree in security analysis. She lives in the Belgrade municipality of Zvezdara.

== Politician ==
=== Municipal politics ===
Krajnović received the seventeenth position on the Progressive Party's electoral list for the Zvezdara municipal assembly in the 2016 Serbian local elections and was elected when the list won twenty-two mandates. She served in the municipal assembly for the next four years and did not seek re-election in 2020. During this time, she was a participant in the Progressive Party's Academy of Young Leaders program.

=== Parliamentarian ===
Krajnović received the 224th position on the Progressive Party's Aleksandar Vučić – Serbia Is Winning list in the 2016 parliamentary election. This was too low for election to be a realistic possibility, and she was not elected even as the list won a majority victory with 131 out of 250 mandates.

She was given the nineteenth position on the successor Aleksandar Vučić — For Our Children list for the 2020 Serbian parliamentary election. This was tantamount to election, and she was indeed elected when the list won a landslide majority with 188 mandates. She is now a member of the assembly's defence and internal affairs committee; a deputy member of the foreign affairs committee and the committee on administrative, budgetary, mandate, and immunity issues; a member of Serbia's delegation to the Inter-Parliamentary Union; the leader of Serbia's parliamentary friendship group with Brazil; and a member of the parliamentary friendship groups with Australia, Croatia, Cuba, Cyprus, Greece, Japan, Jordan, Morocco, Qatar, Spain, Switzerland, Uganda, the United States of America, and Venezuela. In November 2020, she was appointed to the managing board of Belgrade's City Bureau of Expertise.
