= Marjo (name) =

Marjo is a popular female given name in Finland, originated as a variant of the name Marja. Its name day is celebrated on 15 August. As of 2012, more than 12,400 people in Finland have this name. It was most popular in the second half of the 20th century.

== Notable people ==
- Marjo Hippi (born 1978), Finnish curler
- Marjo van der Knaap (born 1958), Dutch neurologist
- Marjo Matikainen-Kallström (born 1965), Finnish politician and cross-country skier
- Marjo-Riikka Mäkelä (born 1977), Finnish actress and director
- Marjo Voutilainen (born 1981), Finnish hockey player
- Marjo Yli-Kiikka (born 1978), Finnish sports shooter

== See also ==
- Marja (name)
- Marjoe
- Marjoe Gortner
