= Marijan Mrmić =

Croatian footballer and coach

Personal information
- Full name: Marijan Mrmić
- Date of birth: 6 May 1965 (age 61)
- Place of birth: Sisak, SR Croatia, SFR Yugoslavia
- Height: 1.80 m (5 ft 11 in)
- Position: Goalkeeper

Team information
- Current team: Croatia (goalkeeping coach)

Youth career
- Željezničar Sunja

Senior career*
Years	Team	Apps	(Gls)
1983–1988	Mladost Petrinja	111	(0)
1988–1993	Cibalia	106	(0)
1993–1996	Varteks	94	(0)
1996–1998	Beşiktaş	51	(0)
1998–1999	Varteks	15	(0)
1999–2000	Charleroi	7	(0)
Total		384	(0)

International career
1999	Croatia B	1	(0)
1995–1999	Croatia	14	(0)

Managerial career
- 2006–: Croatia (goalkeeping coach)
- –2012: Varteks (goalkeeping coach)
- 2016–2019: Beşiktas (goalkeeping coach)
- 2019: Antalyaspor (goalkeeping coach)
Medal record
Men's football
Representing Croatia
FIFA World Cup
Runner-up	2018 Russia (goalkeeping coach)
Bronze medal – third place	1998 France
- * Club domestic league appearances and goals

Marijan Mrmić (born 6 May 1965) is a Croatian former professional footballer who played as a goalkeeper. He currently works as the goalkeeping coach of the Croatia national team.

== Club career ==
Mrmić started his career at hometown in Mladost Petrinja in 1983 and moved to Dinamo Vinkovci in 1988. He left the club in 1993, when it was already renamed to Cibalia, and moved to Varteks. In 1996, Mrmić left Varteks for Turkish club Beşiktaş and spent two seasons there before eventually returning to the Varteks in 1998. By the end of his playing career, he also had a short spell with Belgian club Charleroi, but made only seven league appearances for the club and returned to Varteks, where he finished his playing career in 2000 and continued to work for the club as the first assistant coach, as well as the goalkeeping coach.

== International career ==
Between 1995 and 1999, Mrmić won a total of 14 international caps for Croatia, mainly being the national team's second-choice goalkeeper during the period.

He made his international debut on 11 June 1995 in a 1–0 defeat to Ukraine in Kyiv during the UEFA Euro 1996 qualifying, coming on as a substitute for Dubravko Pavličić in the 27th minute, following a red card to Tonči Gabrić. He made his second appearance in the qualifying on 3 September 1995 in a 7–1 win at home to Estonia, coming on as a substitute for Dražen Ladić in the 29th minute.

Prior to the UEFA Euro 1996 finals, Mrmić appeared in three friendly matches, also playing the full 90 minutes in a goalless draw against England at Wembley. During the finals, he was Croatia's second-choice goalkeeper, with Dražen Ladić being the first choice, and made his only appearance in their final group match, a 3–0 defeat to Portugal.

Mrmić went on to make three appearances in the 1998 FIFA World Cup qualifying, which included playing the full 90 minutes in the second leg of the playoffs against Ukraine. He was also part of the 22-man squad that won the bronze medals at the 1998 FIFA World Cup finals, but did not make an appearance during the tournament.

In January 1999, Mrmić won his only international cap for Croatia B in a friendly match against France B. He also continued to be Croatia's second-choice goalkeeper during the UEFA Euro 2000 qualifying. His only appearance in the qualifying came in a 2–1 win at home to Malta on 21 August 1999. It eventually turned out to be his final international appearance, as he retired from international football two months later, following Croatia's failure to qualify for the finals.

== Coaching career ==
Mrmić has been the goalkeeping coach of the Croatia national team since 2006, also working as the goalkeeping coach of Varteks and Turkish sides, Beşiktaş and Antalyaspor, between 2006 and 2019.

== Honours ==
=== Player ===
Beşiktaş

- Turkish Cup: 1998
- Chancellor Cup: 1997
- TSYD Cup: 1997

=== Goalkeeping coach ===
Croatia

- FIFA World Cup runner-up: 2018

== Orders ==
- Order of the Croatian Interlace – 1998
