= Šatrijos Ragana =

Lithuanian writer, teacher

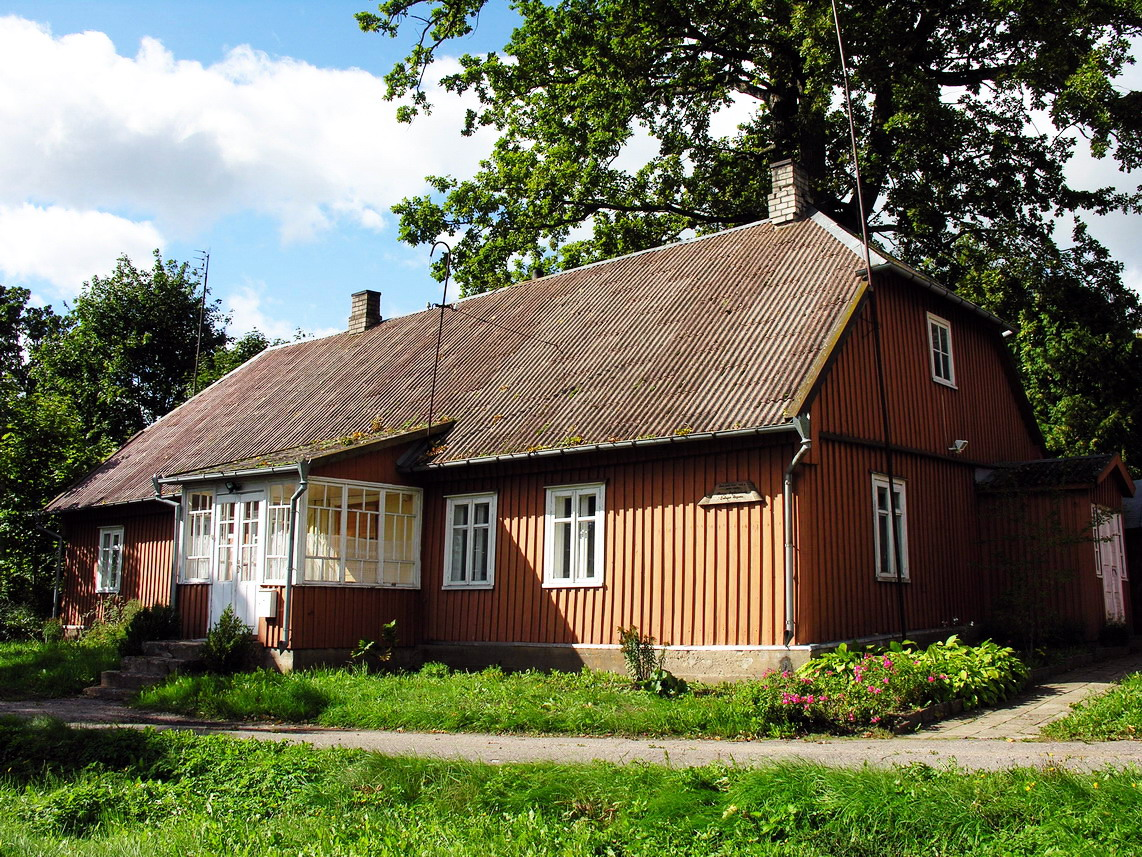
The house where Marija Pečkauskaitė lived in Židikai from 1915 to 1930

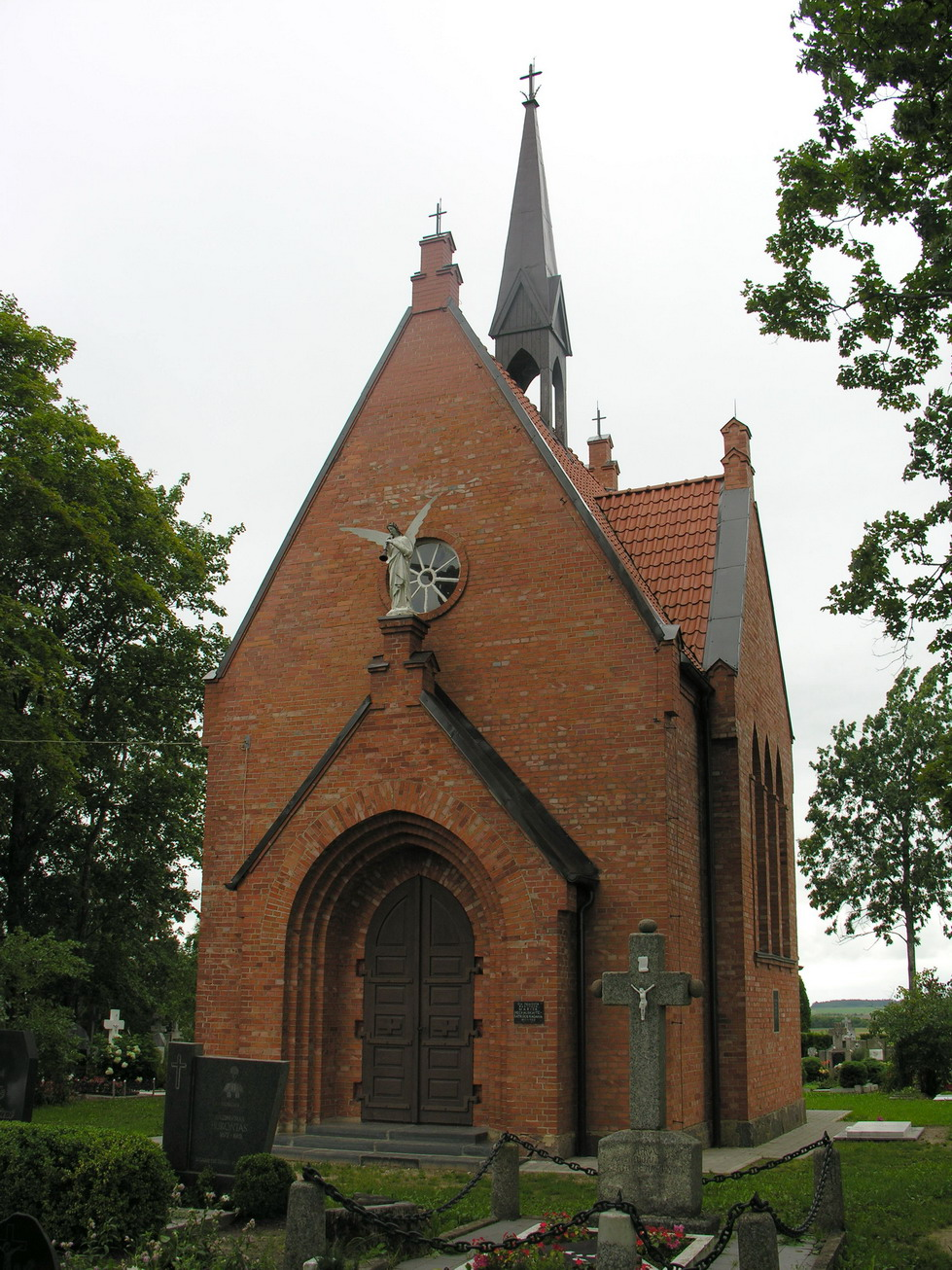
Chapel-grave of Šatrijos Ragana

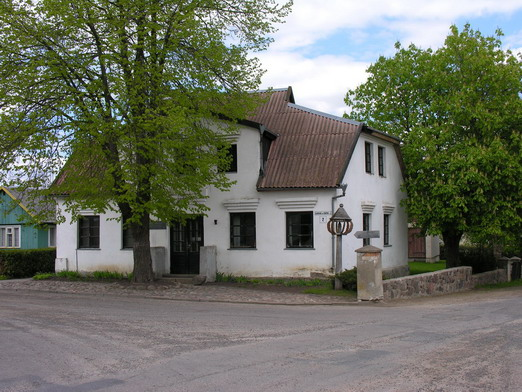
Memorial museum of Šatrijos Ragana in Židikai

Šatrijos Ragana ("Witch of Šatrija") was the pen name of Marija Pečkauskaitė (Polish: Maria Pieczkowska; March 8, 1877 – July 24, 1930), a Lithuanian humanist and romantic writer and educator. Her most successful works are Sename dvare (In the Old Estate, 1922) and Irkos tragedija (Tragedy of Irka).

== Biography ==
Born in Medingėnai, Kovno Governorate to a family of petty Lithuanian nobles, Pečkauskaitė was raised in Polish culture. However, she made friends with local Lithuanian peasants and, influenced by her tutor Povilas Višinskis, joined the Lithuanian National Revival. Because of poor health and expensive tuition, Pečkauskaitė did not graduate from a gymnasium in Saint Petersburg and had to complete her education privately in the Labūnava estate near Užventis. Višinskis translated her first works, written in Polish, into Lithuanian and published in liberal Lithuanian periodicals, such as Varpas and Ūkininkas. However, Pečkauskaitė disagreed with their secular agenda and turned to pro-Catholic Tėvynės sargas and similar newspapers. After her father's death in 1898, the family moved to Šiauliai as the old estate had to be sold for debts. In 1905 she received a scholarship from the Žiburėlis Society, established by Gabrielė Petkevičaitė-Bitė, to study pedagogy at the University of Zurich and the University of Fribourg. While studying, she met with Friedrich Wilhelm Foerster and was greatly affected by his views on education; she later translated several of his works into Lithuanian. After returning to Lithuania in 1907, Pečkauskaitė briefly stayed in Šaukotas and Vilnius. She participated in the First Congress of Lithuanian Women and was elected its vice-chair. In 1909, she was hired by the Žiburys Society as a teacher at a girls' pre-gymnasium in Marijampolė. In 1915 she moved to Židikai, where she spent her remaining life working as a teacher. She was actively involved in the town's cultural life, promoting teetotalism, organizing a youth chorus, and other charity work. For her achievements in pedagogy, Pečkauskaitė was awarded an honorary degree of the University of Lithuania in 1928. She died in Židikai.

== Works ==
Pečkauskaitė debuted in 1896 with short story Margi paveikslėliai (Motley Pictures). Her works reflect social changes in her times: from estates to villages, from former nobles to peasants, from Polish to Lithuanian culture. All of her characters are strong romantic individuals, living according to the Christian ideals. They usually altruistically sacrifice themselves for the benefit of the society. For example, one character, Viktutė, sacrifices her career in the arts to work as a teacher in a small town; or a village lad from Vincas Stonis (1906) who successfully takes over his father's farm and even persuades him to return from America. Pečkauskaitė was one of the first Lithuanian writers to create deep and complex characters, analyzing not only their psychology but also spirituality.

Her most critically acclaimed novel, Sename dvare, is somewhat autobiographical and depicts a family of a Samogitian landlord. The estate and manor owners, unlike in writings of Žemaitė or Lazdynų Pelėda, are not the sources of social injustice, but one of the last remaining outposts of old culture, ideas, and values. Through the depiction of Mamatė (a diminutive derivation from "mother") the author expresses the realization that physical life is temporary and longs for permanent metaphysical existence (death). As with other works, parts inspired by her early childhood are especially bright and warm, colored by loving memories of dreams and aspirations, and lean towards impressionism. In contrast, the short story Irkos tragedija, depicts the painful crash of a young girl's innocent world with harsh reality and family failure.
