= Marja (name) =

Marja is a female given name, a Finnish, Sámi and Dutch form of Mary. It also means "berry" in Finnish. In Finnish the normal form of Mary is Maria; the pronunciations of Maria ['maria] and Marja ['marja] are identical, if the /-ria/ is pronounced as diphthong in as usual in rapid speech: [mari̯a]. As of December 2012, 53,000 people are registered with this name in Finland. In Finland, the nameday for Marja is 15 August.

== Notable people ==
Some notable people with the name Marja are:

- Marja van Bijsterveldt (born 1961), Dutch politician
- Marja Heikkilä (born 1977), Finnish freestyle swimmer
- Marja-Liisa Kirvesniemi (born 1955), Finnish cross country skier
- Marja Kok (born 1944), Dutch actress
- Marja Lahti (1901–1967), Finnish politician
- Marja Lehto (born 1959), Finnish diplomat
- Marja Lehtonen (born 1968), Finnish bodybuilder
- Marja-Liisa Löyttyjärvi (born 1949), Finnish engineer and politician
- Marja Lubeck (born 1965), Dutch-born New Zealand politician
- Marja Merisalo (born 1965), Finnish choreographer, dancer and director
- Marja Mikkonen (born 1979), Finnish artist and filmmaker
- Marja-Liisa Olthuis (born 1967), an Inari Sámi living in the Netherlands
- Marja-Helena Pälvilä (born 1970), Finnish female ice hockey player
- Marja Pärssinen (born 1971), Finnish butterfly and freestyle swimmer
- Marja-Liisa Portin, Finnish orienteering competitor
- Marja Simonowa (1824–1877), German nurse
- Marja van der Tas (born 1958), Dutch politician
- Marja Tiura (born 1969), Finnish politician
- Marja Vis (born 1977), Dutch speed skater
- Marja Wokke (born 1957), Dutch marathon runner

== See also ==
- Marjo (name)
