= Holubec =

Holubec (feminine Holubcová) is a Czech surname. Notable people with the surname include:

- Aleš Holubec (born 1984), Czech volleyball player
- Jiří Holubec (born 1966), Czech biathlete
- Kateřina Holubcová (born 1976), Czech biathlete
- Tomáš Holubec (born 1976), Czech biathlete

== See also ==
- Holub, Holoubek - Czech surnames with similar linguistic origin
- Gołąb, Golomb, Golumbic
