= Golubić (surname) =

Golubić (Serbian Cyrillic: Голубић, pronounced [ɡolǔbitɕ]) is a Serbo-Croatian surname, derived from the word golub, meaning "pigeon". Its literal meaning is "little pigeon". Notable people with the surname include:

- Grgur Golubić (fl. 1347–1361), Serbian nobleman
- Mustafa Golubić (1889–1941) Bosnian guerrilla and spy
- Theodore Roy Golubic (1928–1998), American sculptor
- Thomas Golubić, American movie and television music supervisor
- Dijana Jovetić née Golubić (born 1984), Croatian handball player
- Viktorija Golubic (born 1992), Swiss tennis player

== See also ==
- Golubović, surname
- Golubić (disambiguation)
