= Golub =

Golub may refer to:

== Companies ==
- Golub Capital, a credit asset manager
- Golub Corporation, owner of Price Chopper

== Places ==
- Golub-Dobrzyń, a town in north-central Poland
  - Golub-Dobrzyń County
  - Golub Castle, a Teutonic fortress
  - Golub War, a 1422 war of the Teutonic Knights against the Kingdom of Poland and the Grand Duchy of Lithuania
- Mount Golub, a mountain in Alaska, U.S.

== People ==
- Golub (surname)
- Golub Babić (1824–1910), Bosnian Serb guerrilla chief and a commander of the 1875–77 Herzegovina Uprising
- Golub Janić (1853–1918), Serbian millionaire, MP, and benefactor

== Other uses ==
- Golub (film), a 1988 American documentary film
- Golub-class guard ship, built for the Imperial Russian Navy 1916–1919

== See also ==
- Gollub (disambiguation)
- Golubović, Serb surname
- Golomb, surname
- Holub, surname
