= Golubić =

Golubić is a Serbo-Croatian toponym. It may refer to:

- Golubić, Šibenik-Knin County, a village near Knin, Croatia
- Golubić, Zadar County, a village near Obrovac, Croatia
- Golubić, Bosnia and Herzegovina, a village near Bihać
- Golubić (surname), a South Slavic surname

== See also ==
- Golubići (disambiguation)
- Golubac (disambiguation)
- Golubovići
