= Golob =

Golob is a surname which means "pigeon" or "dove" in Slovenian. Notable people with the surname include:

- Alissa Golob, Canadian anti-abortion activist
- Berta Golob (born 1932), Slovene writer
- Jani Golob (born 1948), Slovenian musician
- Julie Golob, American markswoman
- Lana Golob (born 1999), Slovenian footballer
- Mariša Golob (born 1990), Slovenian powerlifter
- Miha Golob (born 1980), Slovenian footballer
- Natalija Golob (born 1986), Slovenian footballer
- Robert Golob (born 1967), Slovenian businessman and politician
- Rok Golob (born 1975), Slovenian musician
- Sacha Golob (born 1981), British philosopher
- Saša Golob (born 1991), Slovenian gymnast
- Tadej Golob (born 1967), Slovenian mountaineer and writer
- Vinko Golob (1921–1995), Bosnian footballer
- Wayne Golob (born 1953), American-Slovenian musician

== See also ==
- Gollob
