= Holoubkov =

- Municipality
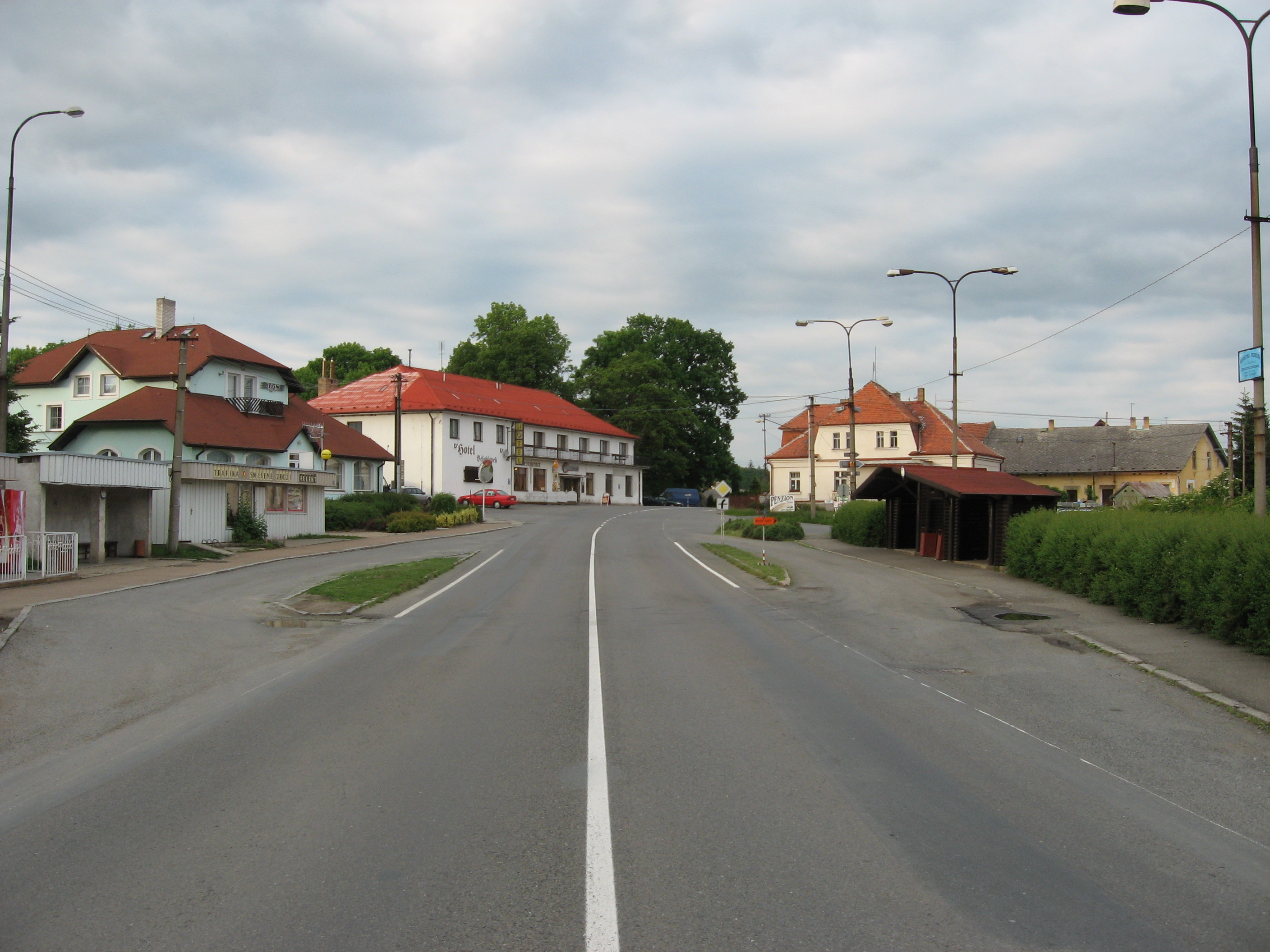
- Centre of Holoubkov

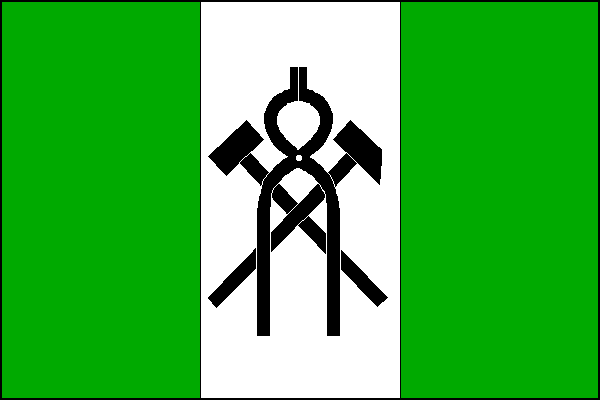
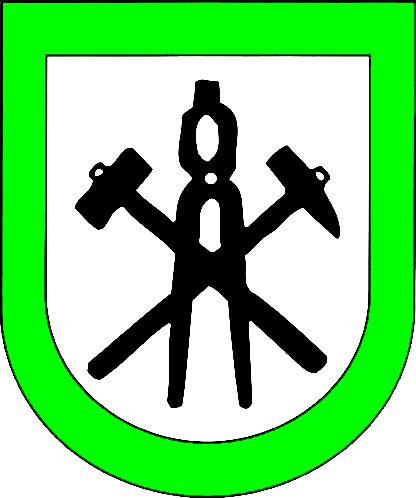
- Flag Coat of arms

- Location in the Czech Republic
- Coordinates: 49°46′33″N 13°41′25″E
- Country: Czech Republic
- Region: Plzeň
- District: Rokycany
- First mentioned: 1379

Area
  - Total: 4.21 km^{2} (1.63 sq mi)
- Elevation: 432 m (1,417 ft)

Population (2026-01-01)
  - Total: 1,454
  - Density: 345/km^{2} (894/sq mi)
- Time zone: UTC+1 (CET)
  - Summer (DST): UTC+2 (CEST)
- Postal code: 338 01
- Website: www.obecholoubkov.cz

Holoubkov is a municipality and village in Rokycany District in the Plzeň Region of the Czech Republic. It has about 1,400 inhabitants.

== Etymology ==
The name is derived from the surname Holoubek, meaning "Holoubek's (court)".

== Geography ==
Holoubkov is located about 8 kilometres (5 mi) northeast of Rokycany and 21 km (13 mi) east of Plzeň. The municipal territory extends into three geomorphological regions. The central part lies in the western tip of the Hořovice Uplands, the northern part lies in the Křivokrát Highlands, and a small part in the south lies in the Brdy Highlands. The highest point is at 506 m (1,660 ft) above sea level.

The stream Holoubkovský potok flows through the municipality. The streams supplies two notable fishponds in the municipal territory: Holoubkovský rybník and Hamerský rybník.

== History ==
The first written mention of Holoubkov is from 1379, when the village was a property of the Rosenberg family. Iron ore was mined in the surrounding forests. During the Thirty Years' War, Holoubkov was destroyed and abandoned. After the war, the village was rebuilt and a blast furnace was founded here in 1662. The railway was built in 1862, which helped further development of Holoubkov. In 1886, the blast furnace was shut down and gradually an engineering plant was established in its place.

== Demographics ==
Historical population

Year	Pop.	±%
1869	571	—
1880	564	−1.2%
1890	801	+42.0%
1900	889	+11.0%
1910	968	+8.9%

Year	Pop.	±%
1921	880	−9.1%
1930	823	−6.5%
1950	806	−2.1%
1961	989	+22.7%
1970	1,045	+5.7%

Year	Pop.	±%
1980	1,328	+27.1%
1991	1,239	−6.7%
2001	1,453	+17.3%
2011	1,469	+1.1%
2021	1,456	−0.9%

Source: Censuses

== Economy ==
Holoubkov is known for the production of machine tools. The first manual lathe was made here in 1840. The production of lathes and drills continues to this day. Since 2000, the factory in Holoubkov has belonged to the German group Weiler GmbH.

== Transport ==
The D5 motorway from Prague to Plzeň runs through the northern part of the territory.

Holoubkov is located on the railway line Plzeň–Beroun.

== Sights ==
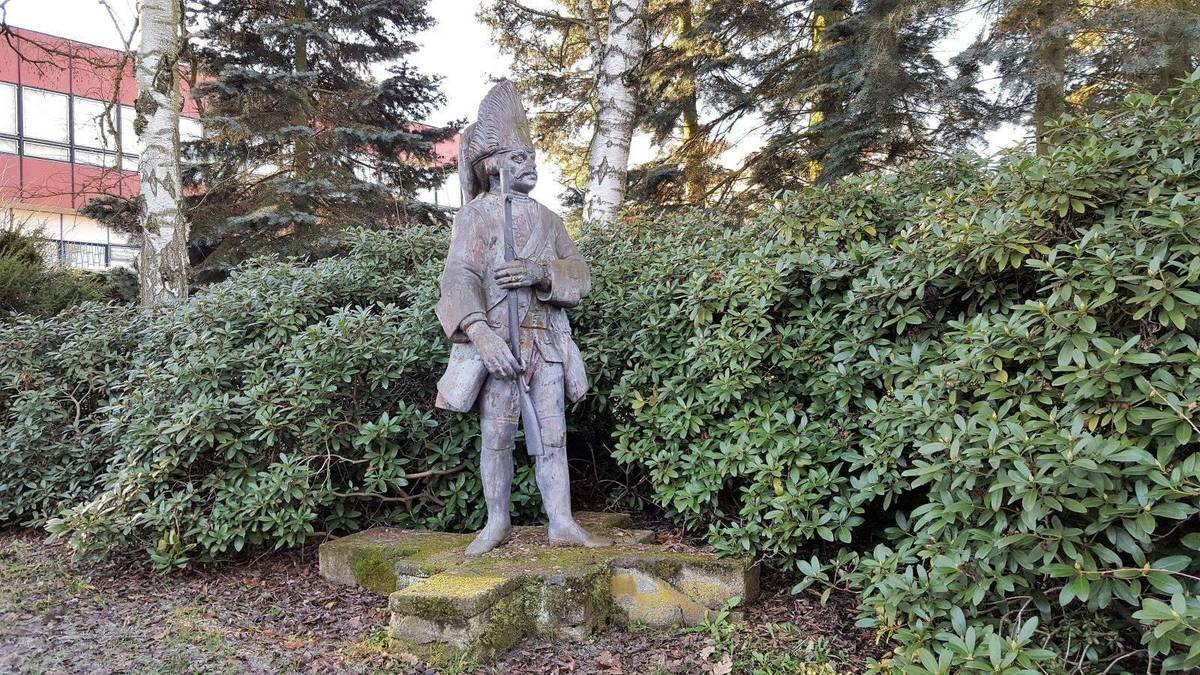
Grenadier Statue

Among the protected cultural monuments in the municipality are the Grenadier Statue (a cast iron statue from 1890, a copy of an older statue from 1756) and Marek Villa (a valuable example of modern architecture designed by Jan Kotěra, built in 1907–1910).
