= Gollob =

Gollob is a surname. Notable people with the surname include:

- Jacek Gollob (born 1969), Polish motorcycle speedway rider
- Tomasz Gollob (born 1971), Polish motorcycle speedway rider
- Gordon Gollob (1912–1987), Nazi German ace pilot

== See also ==
- Golob
- Gołąb (surname)
- Golomb
