= Golombek =

Golombek is a surname. Notable people with the surname include:

- Andreas Golombek (born 1968), German footballer and manager
- Arly Golombek (born 1983), American professional horse rider
- Bedřich Golombek (1901–1961), Czech journalist and writer
- Diego Golombek (born 1964), Argentine biologist, communicator and popularizer of science
- Fabio Golombek (active from 1983), Brazilian-American film producer and director
- Harry Golombek (1911–1995), British chess grandmaster, arbiter, author and wartime codebreaker

== See also ==
- 6456 Golombek, see List of minor planets: 6001–7000#456
