= Jani Golob =

Slovenian musician

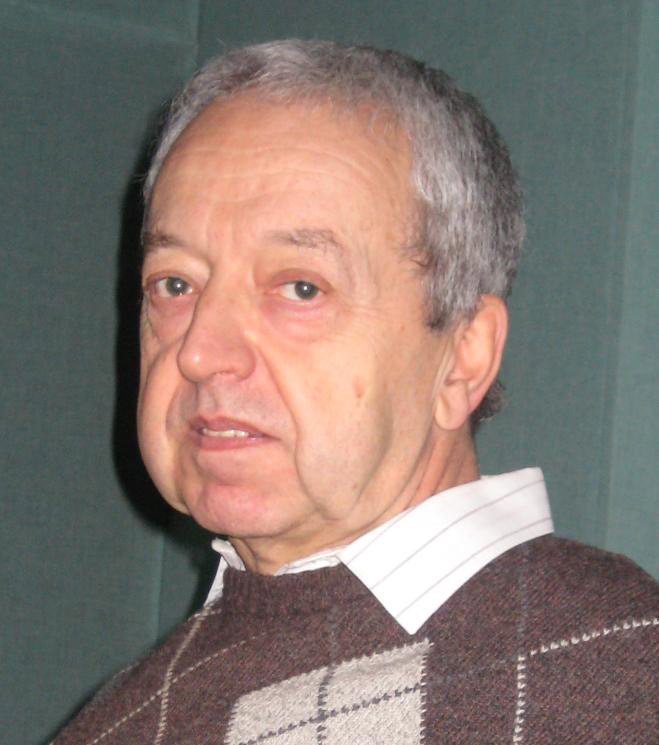
- Golob in 2008

Background information
- Born: 18 January 1948 (age 78)
- Origin: Ljubljana, FPR Yugoslavia, (today Slovenia)
- Occupations: Composer; arranger; violinist; professor
- Years active: 1972–present
- Website: www.dss.si

Jani Golob (born 18 January 1948) is a Slovenian composer, violinist, arranger and professor.

His music opus is often on the thin line of classic, pop and jazz. Golob has composed operas, ballets, orchestral works, chamber and vocal music, as well as numerous Slovenian film scores, and music for television and for advertising purposes. His most important works are probably three operas: Krpan's mare (1992), Medeja (1999) and Love Capital (2010); and others as Four Slovene Folk Songs (1979 and 2005), Concerto for violin and orchestra (1998) and ballet The Baptism at the Savica (1989). He is most recognized by his contribution in Slovenian popular music.

His internationally best-known piece of work is the unofficially named "Planica Slow Motion Theme" (1997), an instrumental piece of music played in slow motion replays annually on worldwide broadcasting of FIS Ski Jumping/Flying World Cup events from Planica, Slovenia. Especially because of this melody Golob became famous worldwide. Each year since 1997 this piece of music is played in Planica slow motion replays live to millions of people worldwide.

Other hit songs are "Prisluhni školjki/A Song In a Seashell" (1985), "Moja dežela/My Country" (1986) and "Pustite nam ta svet/Leave Us This World" (1987), popular especially in Slovenia. In 1971 he also arranged music for the song Sejem želja/Scarborough Fair with Slovenian lyrics of this original English folk ballad. He is the arranger of the most common used orchestrated version of the Slovenian national anthem "Zdravljica", used in protocol, sports and other big events.

In 1973 he acted in a film called Ljubezen na odoru (Love on the Furrows).

Golob has the ability of absolute pitch. When he was younger he would write music in notes just by listening and memorizing it.

He is a member of the European Academy of Sciences and Arts.

== Career ==
In the 1960s he founded Slovene pop band Delial, in which he played bass guitar. He studied violin with graduate education in 1971 and with musical composition in 1977 at the Ljubljana Academy of Music. At first he was mainly an arranger and later started writing his own compositions. From 1998 to 2000 he was professor of music composition and theory at the Academy for Theatre, Radio, Film and Television in Ljubljana (AGRFT). From then on he has been a professor of musical composition at the Ljubljana Academy of Music. Between 2002 and 2006 he was the president of Society of Slovene Composers.

Golob's compositions are performed by the most important Slovene ensembles and orchestras and also different important European artists, such as Slovak State Philharmonic Košice and Berlin Symphony Orchestra, with their conductors George Pehlivanian, En Shao, David de Villiers, and Carl Davis.

He was a member of many international music juries at various European festivals:

- Selector for music for the European Month of Culture EMK (1997)
- Representative of RTV Slovenia at the EBU work group for music (Eurovision, 1992-1998)
- Representative of RTV Slovenia at the International Music Centre in Vienna (1992-1998)
- Member of the international jury at Festival Prix Italia in Turin (1994)
- Member of the international jury at Festival Golden Prague in Prague (1996)
- Member of the European Academy of Sciences and Arts in Salzburg (since 1992)

His son Rok Golob is also a Slovene composer.

== Awards and prizes ==
He has received many Slovenian and international awards in classic and in popular music:

- In 1975, 1976 and 1980 he won the Golden Medal for the best arrangement at the Slovene Song Festival.
- In 1977 he won the Prešeren Award of University of Ljubljana for "Concertino for big orchestra" and the Silver Medal at the Slovene Song Festival.
- In 1978 in Bratislava he won third prize in the Grand Prix de Musique Folklorique de Radio Bratislava for "Sv. Sintilawdič".
- In 1980 he won the Second and third prize of the Expert Jury at the Slovene Song Festival.
- In 1983 he won the Župančič Prize for "Four Slovene Folk Songs for stings".
- In 1986 and 1988 he won the Metod Badjura Recognition Award.
- In 1987 in Cannes he won the collective prize at the Prix National at the 34ème Festival du Film Publicitaire Cinema & Television Cannes for "The Guests are Coming", part of the project "Slovenia, My Country", and won the first prize for it at the festival of tourism short films in Berlin.
- In 2000 he won the Prešeren Fund Prize for "Violin Concerto".
- In 2012 he won the Kozina Award for lifetime achievements in music from the Society of Slovene Composers.

== Selected works ==
=== Orchestral music ===
Year	Original title	English title	Title continues
1977	Concertino	Concertino	for big orchestra
1977	Nokturno	Nocturne	for string orchestra
1978	Sveti Sintilawdič	Sveti Sintilawdič	for chamber orchestra
1979	Komorna glasba	Chamber Music	for orchestra
1979	Štiri ljudske pesmi	Four Folk Songs	for string orchestra
1980	Uvertura	Overture	for symphony orchestra
1980	Elegija	Elegy	for flugelhorn and string orchestra
1982	Koncertantna glasba	Concertante Music	for woodwind quintet and orchestra
1984	Svatbeni ples	Wedding Dance	for two clarinets and string orchestra
1985	Mi za mir	We for Peace	for chamber orchestra (40th anniversary of UN)
1988	Rezijski ples	Rezian Dance	for two Rezian fiddlers and string orchestra
1990	Slovenska rapsodija	Slovenian Rhapsody	for orchestra
1992	Koncert	Concerto	for violin, cello and orchestra
1993	Hommage Rahmaninovu	Hommage Rahmaninovu	for symphony orchestra
1995	Variacije	Variations	for violin, piano and orchestra
1996	Introdukcija	Introduction	for alt saxophone and string orchestra
1996	Introdukcija	Introduction	for alt saxophone and saxophone orchestra
1998	Koncert	Concerto	for violin and orchestra
1998	Concertino	Concertino	za flute and string orchestra
1999	Romanca in humoreska	Romance and Humoresque	for violin and string orchestra
1999	Upanje	Hope	for symphony orchestra
1999	Fanfare	Fanfares	for wind orchestra
2000	Concerto grosso	Concerto grosso	for chamber quartet and wind orchestra
2000	Nostalgija	Nostalgia	for two violas and string orchestra
2000	Passacaglia	Passacaglia	za violino, violo, violončelo in orkester
2000	Koncert	Concertino	for cello and string orchestra
2001	Koncert	Concertino	for cello and string orchestra
2004	Allegro festivo	Allegro festivo	for wind orchestra
2004	Tri epizode	Three Episodes	for horn and orchestra
2005	The Night Shift	The Night Shift	for brass quintet and wind orchestra
2005	Štiri slovenske ljudske pesmi	Four Slovene Folk Songs	for symphony orchestra
2005	Štiri prekmurske ljudske pesmi	Four Prekmurje Folk Songs	za tenor, violino in orkester
2006	Tempered	Tempered	for chamber ensemble and string orchestra
2006	Zlatorog	Zlatorog	ballet suite
2007	Missa in Do	Missa in Do	for soloists, mixed choir, organ and orchestra
-	Vöra bije, sunce mi zahaja	My Time Has Come, My Sun Has Gone	for chamber orchestra
-	Cool Voices	Cool Voices	for string orchestra

=== Vocal ===
Year	Original title	English title	Title continues
1981	Stara Ljubljana	Old Ljubljana	cantata for youth choir, recitator and chamber orchestra
1984	Zreilo je žito	Wheat Has Ripened	for alto, ocarina, hammered dulcimer, percussion and string orchestra
1984	Ne ouri ne sejaj	Ne ouri ne sejaj	for alto and string orchestra
1986	Neznani materi	To the Unknown Mother	for baritone and string orchestra
1988	Tisti čas	That Time	Song Cycle for alto and string orchestra
1989	Lovec na ljudi	Man Hunter	for alto and string orchestra
1995	Quo vadis, Domine	Quo vadis, Domine	for tenor, mixed choir organ orchestra
2005	Vaje v slogu	Exercises in Style	variations on Slovenian folk song for mixed choir and chamber orchestra

=== Choral ===
Year	Original title	English title	Title continues
1979	Mesto	The City	for mixed chorus
1980	Kata, Katalena	Kata, Katalena	for 12 voices
1988	Mesto	The City	for male chorus

=== Opera and ballet ===
Year	Original title	English title	Note
1985	Urška in povodni mož	Ursula and the Water Sprite	ballet in 6 scenes
1989	Krst pri Savici	The Baptism at the Savica	ballet
1992	Krpanova kobila	Krpan's Mare	opera buffa in 3 acts
1994	Matiček se ženi	Matiček's Wedding	ballet in 3 scenes
1999	Medeja	Medeja	opera
2004	Ivana	Ivana	dance puppet show for adults
2010	Ljubezen kapital	Love Capital	opera in 3 acts

=== Chamber music ===
Year	Original title	English title	Title continues
1977	Poema	Poema	for woodwind quintet
1977	Andante	Andante	for string quartet
1977	Romanca	Romance	for viola and piano
1978	Komorna glasba	Chamber Music	for 11 instruments
1978	Balada	Ballad	for trumpet (or flugelhorn) and piano
1979	Capriccio	Capriccio	for soprano saxophone, double bass and percussion
1979	Glasba	Music	for bassoon and piano
1979	Skica	Sketch	for flute and piano
1980	Passacaglia	Passacaglia	for piano quartet
1981	Groteska	Grotesque	for clarinet and piano
1981	Dialog	Dialogue	for violin and guitar
1981	Capriccio	Capriccio	for trumpet and piano
1982	Tri skladbe	Three Pieces	for violin and piano
1982	Igre	Games	for recorder, violin and cello
1982	Glasba	Music	for oboe (or English horn) and harp
1983	Dve skladbi	Two Pieces	for cello and piano
1983	Tri skladbe	Three Pieces	for horn and piano
1983	Melodija	Melody	for cello and piano
1983	Glasba	Music	for flute and piano
1983	Glasba	Music	for accordion and cello
1984	Trio 84'	Trio 84'	for violin, viola and cello
1984	Dialog	Dialogue	for flute and viola
1984	Iz dnevnika padlega partizana	Iz dnevnika padlega partizana	for bass, violin, viola, cello and piano
1984	Tri pesmi	Three songs	for bass, cello and piano
1985	Dialogi	Dialogues	for two violins
1985	Sonatina	Sonatina	for violin and piano
1985	Sonata št. 1	Sonata No.1	for violin and piano
1986	Sonata št. 2	Sonata No.2	for violin and piano
1986	Gozd	Forest	for horn and organ
1986	Uvodna glasba	Introduction Music	for 4 horns
1986	Tri pesmi	Three Songs	for tenor, violin and piano
1987	Godalni kvartet št. 1	String Quartet No.1	-
1987	Godalni kvartet št. 2	String Quartet No.2	-
1987	Koral	Choral	for brass quintet and organ
1987	Tri miniature	Three Miniatures	for double bass and piano
1987	Tri pesmi	Three Songs	for mezzo-soprano, violin and guitar
1987	Monolog	Monologue	for clarinet, percussion and tape
1988	Tri variacije	Three Variations	for cello and piano
1990	Concertino	Concertino	for guitar and string quartet
1990	Toccata	Toccata	for two pianos and percussion
1991	The Seventh Avenue Blues	The Seventh Avenue Blues	for violin and piano
1991	Sonata	Sonata	for cello and piano
1992	Glasba	Music	for alto saxophone and piano
1993	Bagatela	Bagatelle	for recorder and piano
1993	Humoreska	Humoresque	for clarinet and piano
1993	Igre	Games	for two cellos and organ
1993	Tri skladbe	Three Pieces	for horn, trumpet, trombone and piano
1993	Človek zmaguje ali zgodba neke ozdravitve	Man Wins or the Story of a Cure	for woodwind quintet
1993	Dve bagateli	Two Bagatelles	for two violins, cello and organ
1994	Bagatela	Bagatelle	for trumpet and organ
1994	Balada	Ballade	for saxophone ensemble
1994	Igre	Games	for violin, guitar and accordion
1995	Godalni kvartet št. 3	String Quartet No.3	-
1999	Glasba	Music	for flute and piano
2000	Romanca	Romance	for violin and piano
2002	Danubiana	Danubiana	for seven performers
2002	Passacaglia in Toccata	Passacaglia in Toccata	for string quartet
2003	In blue	In blue	for alto saxophone, string quartet and double bass
2005	Glasba	Music	for flute and piano
2006	Invokacija	Invocation	for chamber ensemble
2006	TASF (Moderato assai Ritmico)	TASF (Moderato assai Ritmico)	for brass ensemble
2007	Sence	Shadows	for chamber orchestra
2008	Koncertantne epizode	Koncertantne epizode	for violin and chamber orchestra
2008-09	Slovenska fantazija	Slovenian Fantasy	for flute and piano
2009	Tri bagatele	Three Bagatelles	for harp and chamber orchestra
-	Capriccio	Capriccio	percussion, soprano-saxophone and double bass

=== Works for solo instruments ===
Year	Original title	English title	Title continues
1978	Sonatina	Sonatina	for violin solo
1979	Valse	Valse	for piano
1979	Etuda	Etude	for percussion
1981	Preludij	Prelude	for accordion
1983	Improvizacija	Improvisation	for double bass solo
1984	Dve romanci	Two Romances	for violoncello solo
1987	Slovenska rapsodija	Slovene Rhapsody	for guitar
2005	Tri etude	Three Etudes	for guitar
2007	Tri skladbe	Three Pieces	for piano

== Television ==
=== Film scores ===
Year	Original title	English title
1983	Dih	
1984	Leta odločitve	The Years of Decision
1984	Veselo gostivanje	
1985	Poletje v školjki	A Summer in a Sea-Shell
1986	Heretik	Heretic
1987	Čisto pravi gusar	A Real Pirate
1988	Poletje v školjki II	A Summer in a Sea-Shell II
1988	Odpadnik	The Maverick
1989	Coprnica Zofka	Sophie the Witch
1989	Nekdo drug	Someone Else
1999	Patriot	
2005	Predmestje	Suburbs
2008	Videvanje Van Gogha	Seeing Van Gogh
2010	Črni bratje	Black Brothers

=== TV music ===
Year	Original title	English title	Note
1982	Živeti, živeti	Desire for Life	short documentary
1982	Zmaga	Victory	short documentary
1982	Slike iz leta 1941		short documentary
1983	Putovanje plavog lonca	Trip of a Blue Pot	short animated
1984	Strici so mi povedali		TV series
1984	Kasač		documentary short
1984	Kugy		children's TV series
1984	Gorenčev vrag		children's TV series
1986	Primož Trubar		TV series
1986	Slovenija, moja dežela	Slovenia, My land	for ad Gostje prihajajo
1987	Dopust	Holiday	TV film
1988	Bronasti vijak	Bronze Screw	TV series
1991	Ljubezen po kranjsko	Love, Kranj Style	TV film
1992	Portret Jožeta Galeta	Portrait of Jože Gale	documentary short
1996	Domače obrti na Slovenskem - Krovci	Handcrafts in Slovenia - Roofers	TV documentary short
1996	Domače obrti na Slovenskem - Kamnarji in kamnoseki	Handcrafts in Slovenia - Stonecutters and Stonemasons	TV documentary short
1996	Domače obrti na Slovenskem - Puškarji	Handcrafts in Slovenia - Gunmakers	TV documentary short
1997	Planica		slow motion music (ski flying)
1997	Pesem od Ludomorca	The Ballad of the Butcherman	short film
2006	Sejalci svetlobe		TV film
2006	Sejalci besed		TV film
2006	En dan resnice	One Day of Truth	fiction short
2011	Slovenci in 1. svetovna vojna	Slovenia and World War I	documentary (in production)

== Hit singles ==
Year	Original	English	Performed by
1971	"Sejem želja"	Scarabough Fair	Delial
1985	"Prisluhni školjki"	"Song to a Seashell"	Black & White
1986	"Moja dežela"	"My Country"	Oto Pestner ft. Strune
1987	"Pustite nam ta svet"	"Leave Us This World"	Vlado Kreslin ft. RTV Slovenia Symphony Orchestra
1997	"Planica Slow Motion Music"	"Planica Slow Motion Music"	Jani Golob

== Discography ==
- Jani Golob - skladatelj, 1988 (LP)
- Glasba iz filma Poletje v školjki I. in II., 1986 (cassette)
- Sklicujem zborovanje, šansoni, 1987 (cassette)
- Pusti pevcu peti, Prešernove pesmi, 1991 (cassette)
- Pevca pesem sladka, Prešernove pesmi, 1991 (cassette)
- Škofjeloški pasijon, 1992 (double cassette)
- Jani Golob - skladatelj, 1994 (CD)
- Lepa Vida, glasba iz predstave, 1995 (CD)
