= Holúbek =

Holúbek (feminine: Holúbková or rarely Holúbeková) is a Slovak surname. It is a diminutive from holub (i.e. 'pigeon'). The Czech equivalent of the name is Holoubek. Notable people with the surname include:

- Jakub Holúbek (born 1991), Slovak footballer
- Jindriska Holubkova, Czechoslovak table tennis player
- Radoslav Holúbek (born 1975), Slovak sprinter
