= Golubović =

Golubović, Голубовић is a Serbian surname. Notable people with the surname include:

- Adnan Golubović (born 1995), Slovenian footballer
- Bojan Golubović (born 1983), Bosnian footballer
- Daniel Golubovic (born 1993), Australian decathlete
- Danilo Golubović (born 1963), Serbian politician
- Đorđe Golubović (born 1992), Serbian handball player
- Dušan Golubović (born 1953), Serbian politician
- Nemanja Golubovic, owner of Kale My Name vegan restaurant
- Kristijan Golubović (born 1969), Serbian criminal
- Marko Golubović (born 1995), Serbian footballer
- Mihailo Golubović (1889–1941), Serbian soldier
- Miko Golubović (born 1982), Montenegrin basketball player
- Milan Golubović (born 2000), Serbian handball player
- Miloš Golubović (1888–1961), Serbian artist
- Mira Golubović (born 1976), Serbian volleyball player
- Petar Golubović (born 1994), Serbian footballer
- Predrag Golubović (1935–1994), Serbian film director and screenwriter
- Radivoje Golubović (born 1990), Montenegrin footballer
- Srdan Golubović (born 1972), Serbian film director
- Stefan Golubović (footballer, born 1996), Serbian footballer
- Stefan Golubović (footballer, born 2006), Serbian footballer
- Uroš Golubović (born 1976), Serbian footballer
- Vladimir Golubović (born 1986), Serbian-born Montenegrin basketball player
- Zagorka Golubović (1930–2019), Serbian philosopher, anthropologist and sociologist
