= Golubac (disambiguation) =

Golubac may refer to:

- Golubac, a village and municipality in Serbia.
- Golubac (Mionica), a village in Serbia in Mionica municipality.
- Golubac Fortress, a medieval fortified town in Serbia.
- Golubac (mountain), a mountain in Serbia, near the town of Guča.
