= Gollub =

Gollub may refer to:

- Gollub War (1422), between the Teutonic Knights and Poland
- Golub-Dobrzyń (German: Gollub), a town in Poland

== See also ==
- Golub (disambiguation)
