= Mihailo Golubović =

Serbian and Yugoslav soldier (1889–1941)

- Михаило Голубовић
- Born: 28 December 1889; Belgrade, Kingdom of Serbia
- Died: April 14, 1941 (aged 51); Lebane, Kingdom of Yugoslavia
- Education: Military Academy
- Children: 2
- Military career
- Allegiance: Kingdom of Serbia (until 1918); Kingdom of Yugoslavia (1918–1941)
- Service years: -1941
- Rank: Brigadier General
- Conflicts: Balkan Wars; World War I April War

Mihailo Golubović (Serbian Cyrillic: Михаило Голубовић; 28 December 1889 – 14 April 1941) was a Serbian and Yugoslav soldier and a brigadier general of the Royal Yugoslav Army.

== Biography ==
Golubović was born on 28 December 1889 in Belgrade, at that time the capital of the Kingdom of Serbia. Golubović graduated from the Military Academy, and participated in the Balkan Wars and World War I.

He earned the rank of brigadier general in 1938 and was retired in 1940.

During the German Invasion of Yugoslavia, Golubović was reactivated from retirement and placed in command of infantry of Toplice Division. He was badly wounded and evacuated to hospital where he died from his wounds on 14 April in Lebane.
