= Holoubek =

Holoubek (feminine: Holoubková) is a Czech surname. It is a diminutive of the word holub ('pigeon') and the surname Holub. Its Slovak equivalent is Holúbek. Notable people with the surname include:

- David Holoubek (born 1980), Czech football manager
- Gustaw Holoubek (1923–2008), Polish actor, director and politician
- Jan Holoubek (born 1978), Polish director and cinematographer
- Martina Kořenová, née Holoubková (born 1975), Czech chess player
- Todd Holoubek (born 1969), American comedian, actor and writer

== See also ==
- The Wild Dove (Czech: Holoubek), an orchestral poem composed by Antonín Dvořák
