= Golubići =

Golubići may refer to:

- Golubići, Bosnia and Herzegovina, a village near Kalinovik
- Golubići, Croatia, a village near Samobor
- Golubići, Istria County, a village near Oprtalj, Croatia
