= Leo Holub =

American photographer (1916–2010)

Leo Millard Holub (November 25, 1916 – April 28, 2010) was an American photographer, known for his landscapes and architectural images of San Francisco, and photographs of Yosemite. His contemporaries and close friends included Ansel Adams and Imogen Cunningham. He founded the photography program at Stanford University, where he was faculty from 1969 until 1980.

== Early life ==
Holub was born on a bee farm in Decatur, Arkansas, was a toddler in Oklahoma, and later moved with his family to Dawson, New Mexico, and then to Oakland, California, where he attended elementary through high school. He worked as a printer's devil in Oakland and in the Grass Valley gold mines as a blacksmith's helper to raise money for his education. In 1935, Holub left California to attend the Art Institute of Chicago, which in 2011 awarded him a posthumous Honorary Bachelor of Fine Arts. After just one year, he returned to the West Coast to study at the California School of Fine Arts (presently known as the San Francisco Art Institute) where he was inspired to pursue photography.

== Career ==
Throughout his career, Holub worked in various design firms, advertising agencies, and print shops throughout the Bay Area. He also taught drawing at the California School of Fine Arts, and in 1960, he took a job in the University Planning Office at Stanford University. In 1969, Holub founded the photography program in the Stanford Department of Art and built the university’s first darkroom. For the next decade, Holub taught classes in photography until he retired as a senior lecturer emeritus in 1980. Throughout the course of his career, Holub touched many lives as evident in a 1981 exhibition titled "Thanks to Leo," a project organized by his former students showcasing their work. Following his decade-long career as a professor, Holub left Stanford University to pursue work as a freelance photographer and typographic designer.

In 1986, Bay Area collectors Harry W. and Mary Margaret Anderson commissioned Holub to photograph numerous American artists represented in their private collection. He traveled from San Francisco, throughout California to New Mexico, and New York, capturing portraits of artists such as Richard Diebenkorn, Frank Stella, Roy Lichtenstein, and Robert Rauschenberg at their homes and studios. Over the course of a decade, Holub photographed more than 100 individuals, making this project one of his most exhaustive efforts. In 2007, the Andersons gave this portfolio of over 600 images to the Cantor Arts Center at Stanford University. A collection of Holub’s prints and personal letters also exists in the Smithsonian Archives of American Art.

== Death ==
Holub died on April 27, 2010, at his home in Noe Valley, San Francisco at the age of 93. With news of his death, the Cantor Arts Center at Stanford University held an exhibition titled "Life & Legacy: Leo Holub Photographs and Contemporary Artists' Prints," which ended November 7, 2010.

== Publications ==
- Stanford Seen: Photographs (1964, OCLC 3429998)
- Leo Holub, Photographer (1982, OCLC 8306161)
- Leo Holub: A Lifetime of Photography (2007, ISBN 9780979302404)
