= Golubovići =

- Village
- Location within Bosnia and Herzegovina
- Coordinates: 45°06′37″N 15°56′44″E
- Country: Bosnia and Herzegovina
- Entity: Federation of Bosnia and Herzegovina
- Canton: Una-Sana
- Municipality: Velika Kladuša

Area
  - Total: 3.44 sq mi (8.91 km^{2})

Population (2013)
  - Total: 750
  - Density: 220/sq mi (84/km^{2})
- Time zone: UTC+1 (CET)
  - Summer (DST): UTC+2 (CEST)

Golubovići is a village in the municipality of Velika Kladuša, Bosnia and Herzegovina.

== Demographics ==
According to the 2013 census, its population was 750.

Ethnicity in 2013
Ethnicity	Number	Percentage
Bosniaks	598	79.7%
other/undeclared	152	20.3%
Total	750	100%
