= Arly Golombek =

Professional horse rider

Arly Golombek is a professional horse rider from Detroit, Michigan.

== Early life and career ==
Golombek was born on August 17, 1983, in Detroit, Michigan. She attended Michigan State University for business management and started riding horses at age 9. She become a professional equestrian since age of 23 and has been competing internationally since age 30 as a member of the Israeli showjumping team. Golombek has won an International high jump 6 bar competition in Biarritz France with her mare Dolce Vita and has also won a team bronze and individual silver in Maccabi games 2019 with her mare Vanilla Mail. She got 4th Place in the Prix of Macôn in 2019 with a stallion named Very Good de la Bonn. She also won the open national division champion with her horse vanilla Mail 2020. She is one of the sponsored riders of Parlanti, a premium equestrian boot designer from Italy.
