= Golomb =

Golomb or Gollomb is a surname.

It may refer to:

- Abraham Golomb (1888–1982), Yiddish-language teacher and writer
- David Golomb (1933–2019), Israeli politician
- Eliyahu Golomb (1893–1945), leader of the Haganah in Mandate Palestine
- Hirsch Nissan Golomb (1853–1934), Russian Hebrew writer, musicologist and teacher
- Jacob Golomb (1947–2023), Israeli philosopher
- Michael Golomb (1909–2008), American mathematician and educator
- Rudy Gollomb (1911–1991), American football player
- Solomon W. Golomb (1932–2016), American mathematician and engineer
  - Golomb ruler
  - Golomb coding

== See also ==
- Golombek
- Gołąb (surname)
