= Gołąb (surname) =

Gołąb (Polish pronunciation: [ˈgɔwɔmp]) or Golab is a Polish-language surname, meaning "dove". It may refer to:

- Maciej Gołąb (born 1952), Polish musicologist
- Marek Gołąb (1940–2017), Polish weightlifter
- Michał Ilków-Gołąb (born 1985), Polish footballer
- Stanisław Gołąb (1902–1980), Polish mathematician
- Zbigniew Gołąb (1923–1994), Polish and American linguist
- Tony Golab (1919–2016), Canadian football player

== See also ==
- Gollob
- Golomb
