= Hirsch Nissan Golomb =

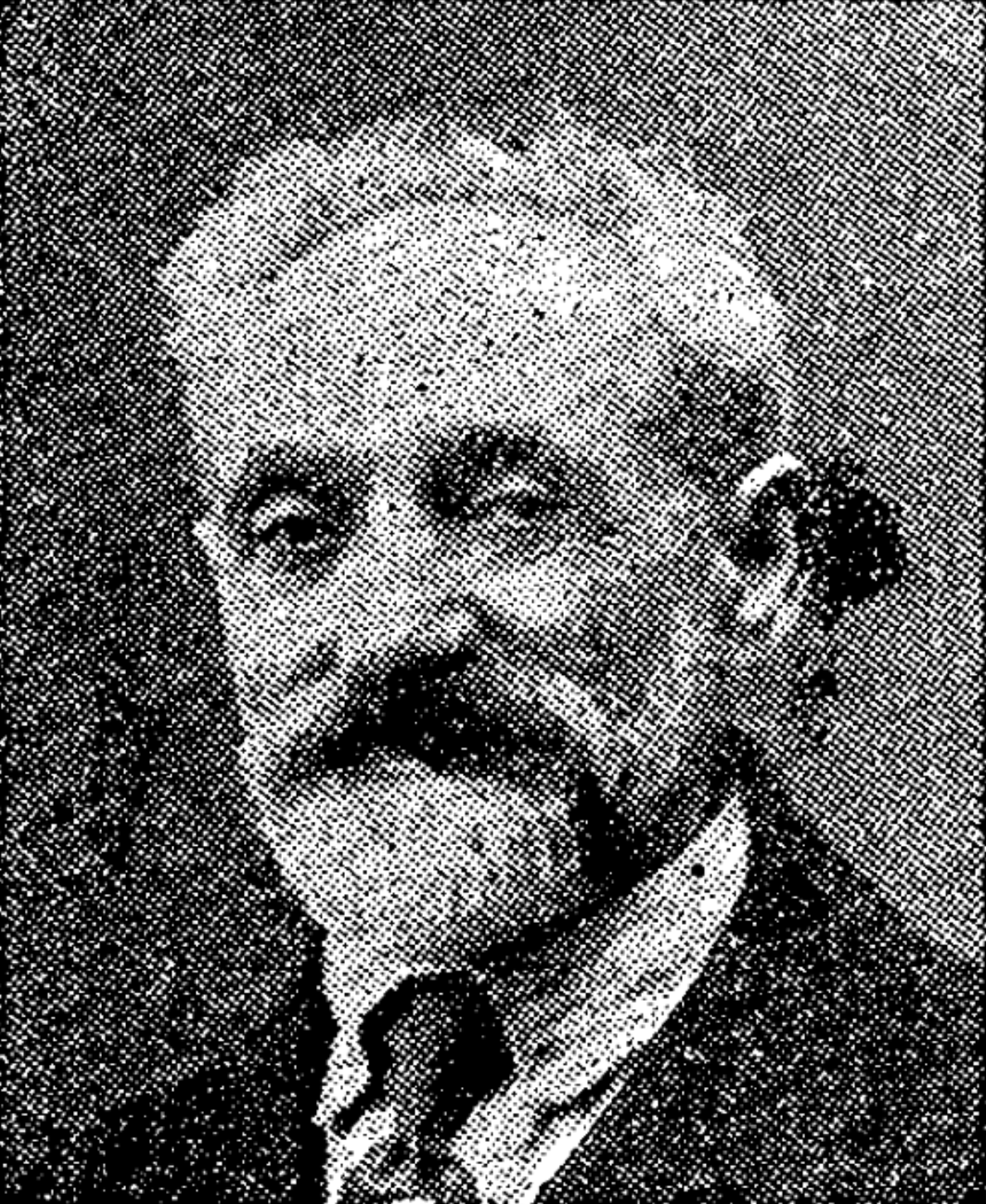
- Born: 15 December 1853; Podzelve, Kovno Governorate, Russian Empire
- Died: 8 September 1934 (aged 80); Wilno, Wilno Voivodeship, Second Polish Republic
- Writing career
- Language: Hebrew

Hirsch Nissan Golomb (Hebrew: צְבִי נִיסָן בֵּן אַבָּא אֱלִיָּהוּ גָאלָאמְבְּ, Tzvi Nissan ben Abba Eliyahu Golomb; 15 December 1853 – 8 September 1934) was a Russian Hebrew writer, musicologist, and teacher.

== Biography ==
Hirsch Nissan Golomb was born at Podzelve to Abba Eliyahu Golomb, a rabbi and teacher. He studied at the yeshiva of Wilkomir, and received musical training at Vilna.

After briefly working as a teacher and peddler, Golomb was hired as a corrector at the Widow and Brothers Romm publishing house in Vilna. While there he translated into Yiddish the Hilkhot De'ot of Maimonides's Mishneh Torah (1876). He also published several pamphlets in Yiddish, among them Mishle Ḥakhamim. He then published a series of works on music: Kol Yehudah, a musical chrestomathy (1877); Menatzeaḥ bi-Neginot, a manual of singing and the violin, partly in Hebrew and partly in Yiddish (1884); and Zimrat Yah, a manual of harmony, in Hebrew and Yiddish, followed by a musical glossary (1885). He also wrote a series of school-books, including Ḥeder la-Tinoḳot, a Hebrew reader (1883); Lahakat Nevi'im, a graded Hebrew chrestomathy (1888); and Ḳiryat Sefer, a description of Vilna, Grodno, Byalistok, and Warsaw, and of their Jewish communities. Throughout his life he contributed to the Hebrew periodicals Kol la-Am, Ha-Israeli, Ha-Kol, Ha-Levanon, Ha-Melitz, Ha-Tzefira, and Ha-Yom.

Golomb earned his livelihood by teaching violin and writing captions for tombstones. He suffered poverty all his life and died in a Vilna home for the aged in 1934.
