= Golub (surname) =

Golub is a surname mostly associated with Ashkenazi Jews. Notable people with the surname include:

- Chris Golub (1954–1978), American football player
- David Golub (1950–2000), American pianist
- Gene H. Golub (1932–2007), mathematician and computer scientist
- Harvey Golub (born 1939), American business executive
- Irina Golub (born 1980), ballerina
- Ivan Golub (born 1989, Ukrainian boxer
- Jeff Golub (1955–2015), American jazz guitarist
- Leon Golub (1922–2004), American artist
- Todd Golub, American pediatrician
