= Theodore Roy Golubic =

American artist

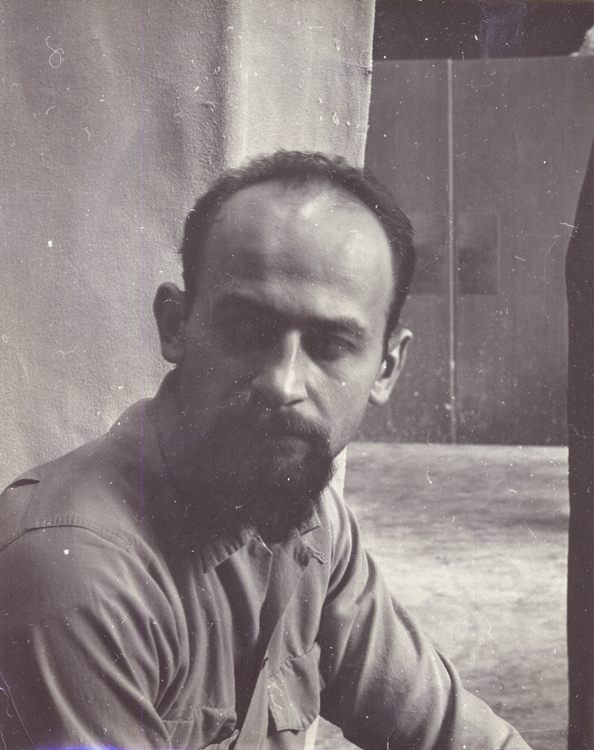
Ted Golubic

Theodore Golubic (December 9, 1928 – November 29, 1998) was an American sculptor and painter. He studied sculpture at the Syracuse University under Ivan Meštrović and eventually became his assistant at Syracuse and Assistant Fellowship to Meštrović at Notre Dame University. He was a guest teacher at Notre Dame and PBS "Art School of the Air." After receiving his Master of Fine Arts degree from the University of Notre Dame (under Meštrović). Later in his career he created three-dimensional sculpture to four-dimensional art that involved shadow and light. He is referenced in Who's Who in American Art, exhibited and commissioned both regionally and nationally. As a creative artist, he combined both science and art, and received five US technology patents in semiconductors, one for a three-dimensional packaging design.

== Early life and education ==
Ted Golubic was born December 9, 1928, in Lorain, Ohio to Ivan and Illonka Safar Golubic. Ted attended Lorain High School where he graduated on January 2, 1947.

== Personal life ==
Golubic married Rose Ieraci on November 27, 1958. He had four children: Vincivan (Vince), Theodore Eric, Victor Gregory, and Georjia Terese.

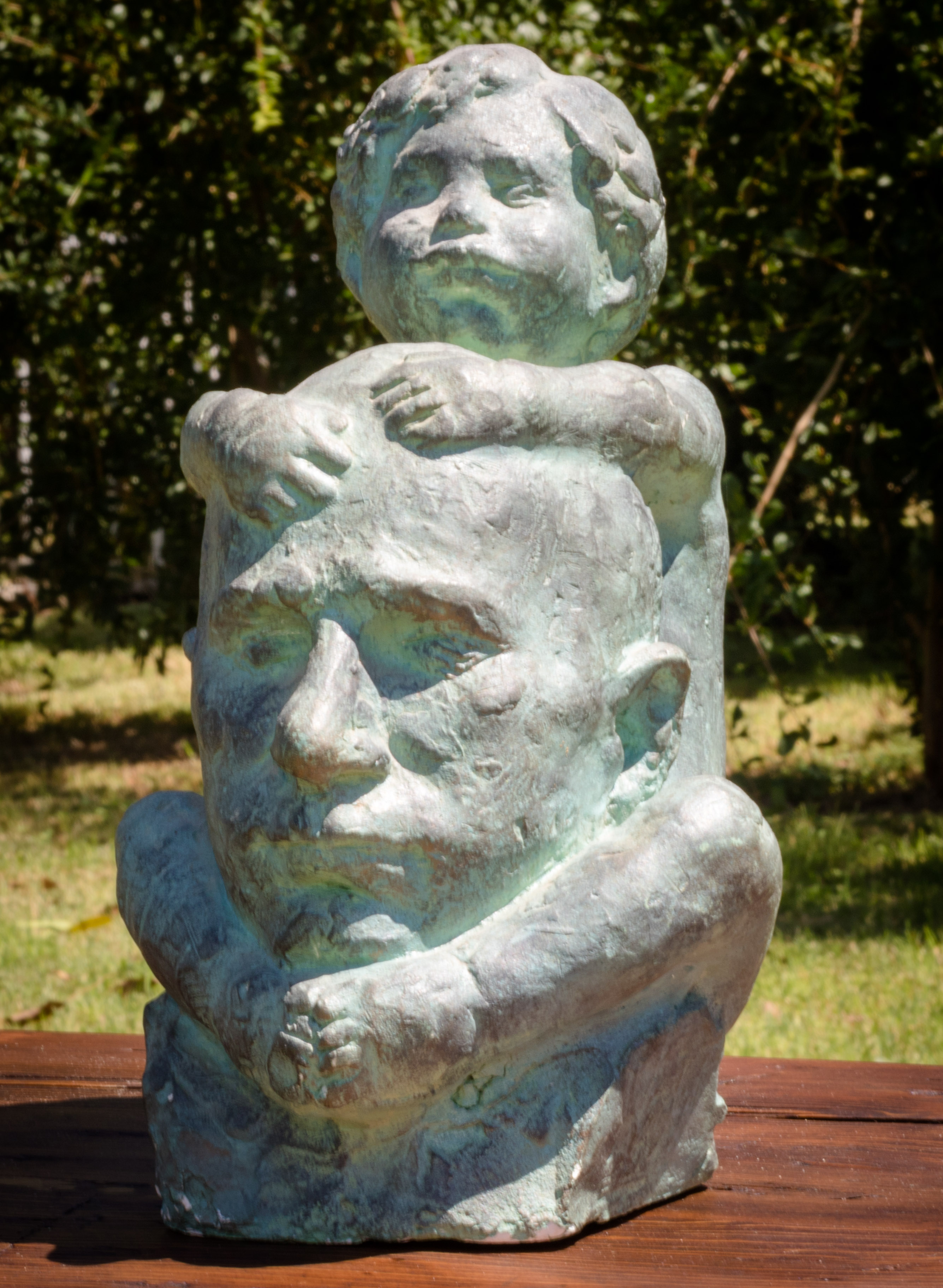
Portrait of his father John Golubic with his grandson on his shoulders by Ted Golubic & Ivan Mestrovic (1960).

== Career ==
- 1959 Summer Term, Guest Teacher, University of Notre Dame
- 1960–1962 Draftsman, Redevelopment Department, South Bend, Indiana. Designed and executed all artwork, maps, ownership data and visual aids to assist eligibility criteria for structural buildings
- 1965–1967 Sculptor Consultant, Rock of Ages Corporation. Consulted in matters of design and carving techniques. Eight bas-reliefs in an exclusive Crypt Series
- 1969 Fall Teacher, Sculpture and drawing, Central Missouri State University, Warrensburg, MO
- 1970–1971 Teacher, Sculpture and Mixed Media, San Diego Sculptor's Guild
- 1971–1972 Artist-in-Residence, Roswell Museum and Art Center, Roswell, New Mexico
- 1972–1996 Motorola Semiconductor, Phoenix, AZ

== List of works ==
=== Activities in art ===
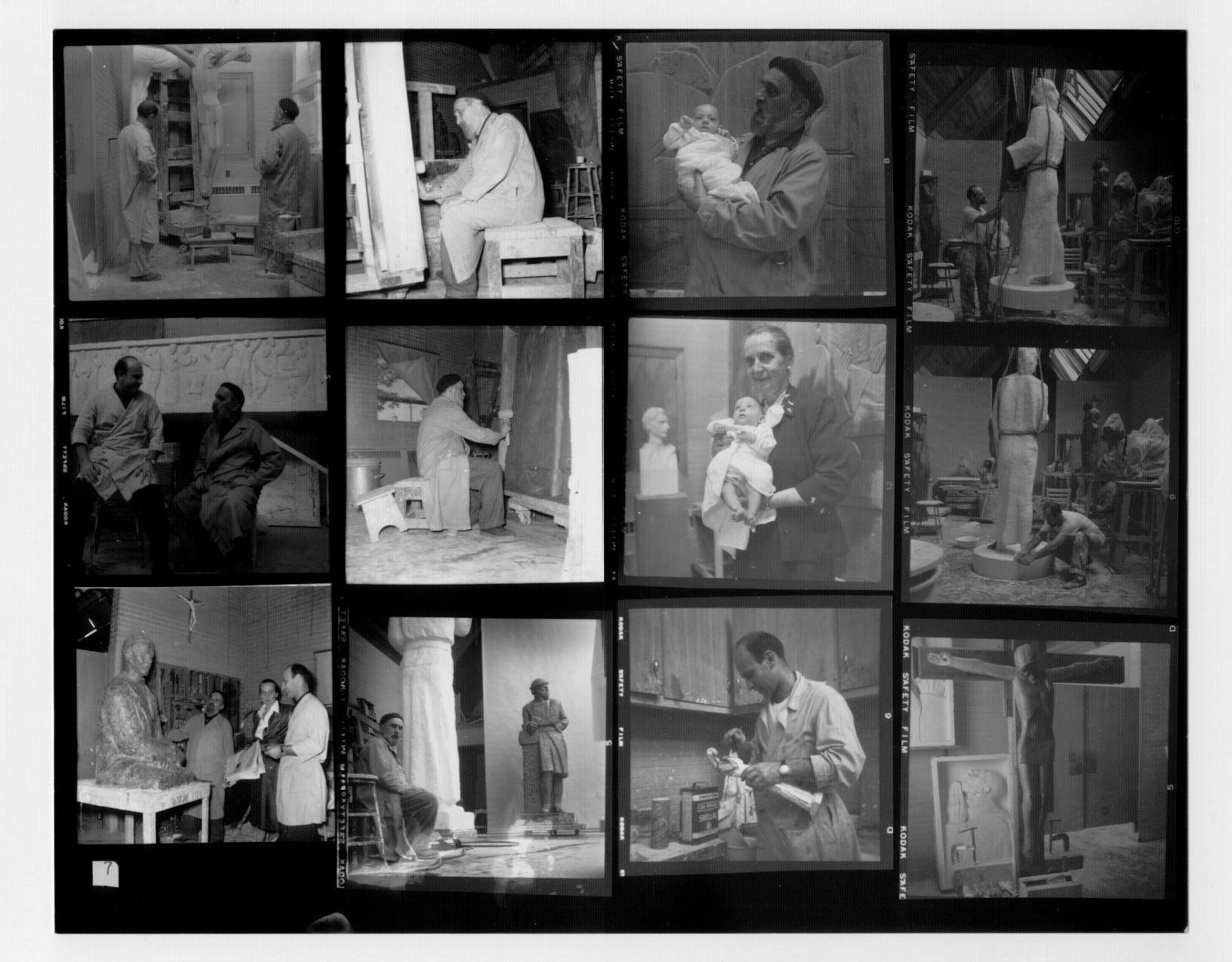
Meštrović and Ted Golubic (circa 1958, Notre Dame Studio)
- 1958–1997 Works commissioned/exhibited regionally and nationally (selected list follows) in 3 and 4 dimensional sculpture; teaching, and technological invention*, 1958–1997
- GUEST TEACHER, "Art School of the Air" ABC, Ch. 28, Elkhart, Indiana, 1962–63, five 1-hour demonstrations on live television
- EXPERIMENTAL EXPRESSION: Sun/Time (4D) Dimensional projection-shadow/spectral forms as produced by planetary rotation, 1962
- WORK FEATURED, DISCUSSED: Workshop, 28th Annual Conference, American Society for Aesthetics - "Light, Matter and Shadow Dynamics as Produced by Planetary Rotation", Boulder, Colorado, 1970
- INTERNATIONAL SCULPTURE SYMPOSIUM: "Beli Vencac", Arandjelovac, Yugoslavia. Invited sculptor, 1973
- INVENTOR: "Eureka Award" for a Semiconductor Chip Module, 1995; one of five patents for Motorola, SPS: 1974, 1979, 1985, 1989, 1995
- TESTAMENT SERIES: work in progress, never completed. St. Peter, St. Paul, David, St. Joseph, 1996–97
- SELECTED Juried/Invitational EXHIBITIONS 1955–
- 3rd Regional Art Exhibition, Syracuse Museum of Fine Arts, 1955. "Estelle", plaster cast
- ART USA:58, Madison Square Garden, New York. "Sermon on the Mount (Beatitudes)", mahogany
- Invitational, St. Mary's College, Notre Dame, IN. 1958
- 134th Annual Exhibition, National Academy of Design, 1959. "Angel of the Annunciation", marble
- Annual Faculty Exhibition, Univ. of Notre Dame Art Gallery, 1959. "Pegasus", drawing
- Second Biennial of American Painting and Sculpture, Detroit Inst. of Art (November 1959–January 1960), "Martyrdom of St. Joan", wood burning
- 155th Annual Exhibition of American Painting & Sculpture, Pennsylvania Academy of Fine Arts, Philadelphia, Pa. 1960. "Martyrdom of St. Joan", wood burn carving
- Festival of Religious Arts, 1961. Central Presbyterian Church, Rochester, N.Y. "Martyrdom of St. Joan" wood burn carving
- Unitarian Society in Fall River, Fall River, MA. 1962. Oracle Amanita and St. Joan accepted but not able to deliver
- Kalamazoo Institute of Art, 1964. Submitted "Discourse", plaster for bronze
- One Man Show, CBS television, Channel 22, South Bend, Indiana, sculpture exhibit and discussion of works September 1962 (read 1962 interview to follow)
- 24th Annual Exhibition, Northern Indiana Art Salon, Hammond, IN. 1967. "Europa", hammered lead repousse, coated for safety
- Biennial, South Bend Local Art Exhibition, 1967. "Oracle", cast iron (found pieces)
- 13th Annual Drawing and Small Sculpture Show, Ball State Univ., Muncie, Indiana (March 1967) "Such That Have Windmills in Their Heads (Don Quixote)", cast iron (found pieces)
- 34th Annual Exhibition, National Sculpture Society, Lever House Gallery, NYC, NY, 1967 "Evening", marble
- National Competition, Corcoran School of Art, Playground Proposal, 1967. "drawings".
- Mount Vernon Arts Council, Crafts & Good Design Show, Mount Vernon, Illinois, 1968. "Resurrection and Nativity", mahogany
- 18th Annual National Exhibition, Springfield Museum of Fine Arts, Springfield, Massachusetts, 1967 "Resurrection", mahogany, honorable mention
- 56th Annual National Exhibition, Art Association of Newport, Rhode Island, 1967. "Don Quixote", created of cast iron
- 3rd Annual Art for Religion, Bethlehem Evangelical Lutheran Church, 1967. "Angel of the Annunciation", marble and "St. Francis", plaster
- 5th Biennial Michiana Regional Show, South Bend Art Center, 1968. Two works — "Equinoctial Point", marble and "Such That Have Windmills in Their Head" (Don Quixote) created from cast iron
- 11th Rhode Island Arts Festival, 1969. Submitted "Heliotrimorph", slides return delayed (read letter)
- Rochester Festival of Religious Art, 1969. Rochester, N.Y. "Nativity", mahogany
- Mainstreams '69. Submitted "Heliotrimorph", not shown for technical setup needs for lights
- San Diego Institute. "Evening" and "Resurrection". 6/1970
- ART FOR 1970, Southern California Expo, Del Mar, CA. 1970. "Oracle, Bird of Prophecy", of cast iron; Submitted "Discourse", plaster sculpture
- VISUAL ARTS WORKSHOP, "Heliotrimorph" work exhibited and discussed, American Society for Aesthetics, 28th Annual Conference, University of Colorado, Boulder, 1970
- First Contemporary International. Chico, CA. 3/1971. Submitted conceptual paper on "Gravity"
- Museum of New Mexico, 1972. Submitted "Times Color Arrow", acrylic
- One Man Show, Roswell Museum and Art Center, at Sunspot, New Mexico, 1972. "Sun Touchstone", poured acrylic resin and black marble sand
- HUD, The National Community Arts Program, 1973: "Times Color Arrow" was accepted for their publication, #120, Pg 25
- Mainstreams '74. "Pad-a-Pod", Submitted assemblage of athletic knee pads and foam rubber
- Dimensions '75. Tucson Museum of Art, Tucson, Az. "Free-Spirit" - Life/Light: Dimensional Drawing, boxed acrylic proto- form for shadow display, 43½ H × 25½ W
- Expressions of Faith V, National Juried Exhibition of Contemporary religious Art Work, 1991. A.P. Tell Gallery, Grand Canyon University, Phoenix, AZ

=== Publications (articles, referenced) ===
- Vinko Nikolic (Ed.) Croatian Review, Jubilee Edition, Buenos Aires: Vol. 4 (December 1960) pp. 481–484
- Francis H. Eterovic and Dominic Spalatin: CROATIA: LAND, PEOPLE, CULTURE, (Toronto: University of Toronto Press, 1964), pp 332, 339
- Biographical Directory, Francis H. Eterovic (Ed.) DePaul University Press, Chicago, Illinois, 1970, pp. 35–36
- Author, Guest Editorial: American Art in Stone, March, 1967
- Cover, feature article: "In Art There Is Victory", American Art In Stone, April, 1967
- Valeria Hatch, "Westart", (California, November 20, 1970), pg. 3
- Quarterly Bulletin, Roswell Museum and Art Center, Vol. 19, No. 4, Fall, 1971 Ibid Vol. 20, No. 2, Spring, 1972
- Dictionary of International Biography, Vol. xi, 1974
- "Who's Who in the West", 1984–
- Biography: "Who's Who in American Art", 1973–1996

=== Commissions (selected) 1958– ===
- CRUCIFIXION CORPUS, bronzed, over life-size, main altar, Little Flower Church, South Bend, IN. 1957
- ANGELS IN MOURNING, limestone, 12 life-size figures in high relief, main altar, St. Joseph's Church, Gary IN. 1960
- CIRCE, bronze bas-relief for Mrs. H. Fredrick Willkie, Elwood, IN.; Madrid, Spain 1961
- MODUnit, a set of 14 Modular tile units offering unlimited combinations in free-form compositional relief, designed exclusively for Cerilean Products Co., South Bend, IN. 1962
- ST. JOSEPH THE WORKER, heroic-size, limestone, high relief, St. Joseph the Worker Church, South Bend, IN. 1964
- MAUSOLEUM SCULPTURE SERIES, eight bas-reliefs exclusively for Rock of Ages Corp., Barre, VT. 1965–66
- NATIVITY, limestone, free-standing high relief for the Cathedral Church of the Nativity, Loras J. Watters, Archbishop of Dubuque, Iowa, 1967
- ST. JOHN THE BAPTIST, heroic-size, free-standing bronze, St. John's Church, Lorain, OH. 1967
- INVENTOR: Three-Dimensional Interconnected Integrated Circuit for Motorola, Patent 1989. Became derivative for other inventors
- INVENTOR "Eureka Award", for a Semiconductor Chip Module, 1995; one of 4 earlier patents for Motorola SPS: 1974, 1979, 1985
- TESTAMENT SERIES for Mausoleum Project: DAVID, St. PAUL, ST. PETER, ST. JOSEPH (project not completed — Sculptor deceased 11/29/99)
- Military Service: United States Army Sergeant, Signal Message Chief, 1951–53; Honorably Discharged 7/1959

==== List of works done at Syracuse or Notre Dame ====
- Madonna & Child, 1954–55 (remains at Syracuse University Storage) plaster, made several other models
- Angel Gabriel, 1954. Plaster sketch
- Sermon on the Mount in mahogany (Beatitudes), 1954. Shown in FIRST ART USA:58, NYC. for Judy Juhl Foster in Warrensburg, Mo
- Portrait of Estelle, 1955
- Battling Centaur, 1955. Plaster sketch
- Portrait of Nancy, 1955. plaster
- Portrait of Stasha, 1955. plaster
- Portrait of Peggy, 1955. plaster
- Darlene, portrait and full figure, 1955
- Greek Girl (Vassiliky), portrait, cast stone, 1956. Owned by Vince Golubic
- Egyptian Madonna, 59" high, 1956. Plaster, copper patina
- St. John, 1956 (Plaster sketch) shown in "Hrvaska Revija" booklet. Copy of issue available.
- Lazarus, 1956. Plaster sketch
- Madonna's Head, 1956. Bronze (done at N.D.) 19" high
- Europa & the Bull, 1956. Hammered lead repousse (coated for safety) done at N.D. 28" high
- Caryatid (or Winter), 1956. Brazilian rosewood, left over from project ordered by Meštrović for his work. Heavy, over life-size. (also did a plaster Caryatid sketch, 26" 1958)
- Slave,(Meditation) 1956. Plaster for bronze, over-life size 76" high. (Altered in genital area in 1969).
- St. John, 1956. Limestone, Bob Mejer at Quincy University may know the whereabouts, possibly given to Professor Sessler, may have been painted
- Boszko portrait, 1956
- Lipathian Maid (Sabine Woman), 1956. Plaster. Was sawed in half to make it into a relief before we left South Bend, in 1969 (renamed Sabine Women) wood frame was put around it. Had been in Lakeville, IN.
- Portrait of Fr. B. Sauvigny, done at Notre Dame, 1956
- Meštrović Portrait, 1956. Done at N.D., no longer available
- Winged Victory, 1957 Hammered lead repousse, (coated for safety) done at N.D.
- Penelope (Andromeda), 1957. Plaster, copper patina. 27" high, base 14" × 27"
- Adolescent Christ, 1957. Plaster, bronzed patina, 62" high. School in Chicago planned purchase to donate it as a present from the graduating class
- Sphinx (Georgia as Sphinx), 1957. Plaster, bronze patina
- Discourse, plaster. 1957. 22". Impressionistic modeling
- Crucifixion Corpus, 1957. Life-size, plaster, for altar at St. Theresa Little Flower Church, South Bend, IN
- St. John, 1957. Plaster sketches for Des Plaines Mausoleum proposal
- Angel of Annunciation, 1958. Marble. (Exhibited at ART FOR RELIGION EXHIBIT, Bethlehem Evangelical Lutheran Church, Indianapolis, IN.) 12" × 14"
- David, 1958. 16", plaster sketch
- Evening, 1958. Marble 11½" × 13"
- St. Paul, 1958. Plaster, copper patina. (Joe Simeri, family friend and lawyer in South Bend who represented Ted for Redevelopment case. Ted then left Redevelopment and went to work for Cerilean Products.
- My Portrait, 1958. Plaster, made before our wedding.
- Head of St. John, 1958. Plaster, bronze patina
- Martyrdom of St. Joan, 1959. Burned wood carving. Exhibited at Detroit Institute of Art and Pennsylvania Academy of Fine Arts, 1960
- Horus, 1959. (sketch). Left at 727 Turnock St. Was experiment to add channels to pour wax for quicker mold. Also left plaster portrait of Josip Turkalj. Executed in 1955.
- Adam & Eve (Queen of Adam), 1959. 46", Mahogany. Given to Diane Dudley, her husband, Tom, may still have it. Letters available. (Diane may have sold it before her death). Should try to contact Dayna Marie Dudley (married to Randall L. Youts in Mishawaka, IN. Sculpture could be donated if still available).
- Angels in Mourning, 1959. Limestone reliefs of 12 angels for altar in Gary, Indiana church. Josip Turkalj did the other side. Read the history.
- Entombment, 1959. Small plaster relief
- Assumption, 1959. Sketch for Mr. Miholich. His sister, Irene who worked at Redevelopment, encouraged Ted to do it.
- Cardinal Stepinac, 1959. Plaster, symbolic relief depicting him as prisoner/martyr. 48" high
- Cardinal Stepinac, 1959 (Carved in granite from Meštrović model for permanent display in Key West, Florida)
- Cardinal Mindzenty, 1959 (Carved in granite from Meštrović model for permanent display in Key West, Florida)
- Resurrection, 1959. 64", Mahogany, made of multiple pieces glued together. The original wood piece that was used for chest area inspired Ted to assemble pieces for the final carving.
- Dedo and Nana Portraits. 1959
- Tenth Station, 1960. Plaster relief, 12" × 18"
- Crucifixion, 2 plaster sketches, 1960
- St. Francis, 1960. Plaster figure, 40" high. For Rev. J. Kriszmanich, O. F. M., Detroit, Michigan
- Dr. Herbert Schiller, 1960. Plaster, patina. Portrait of obstetrician who delivered Ted and Roses children- Vince, Tho, Victor, and Georjia children, including the children of Roses two sisters.
- Oracle Amanita or Shades of the Shadow, 1960. Painted acrylic mixed with sand. Sculptural form was to symbolize atom bomb, the interior proto-form was symbol of humanity, lit by artificial lights. Was made at 914 N. Notre Dame Ave. Basement. So large did not know if it could be taken out of basement, gave it to Vince Mejer and donated to Notre Dame. The only other Shadow Proto-form was reproduced later and put in box as it now exists as "Free Spirit".
- Heliotrimorph, 1961. 13" × 35" × 35" Copper, sun/time, shadow and light. Shown at Seminar for Aesthetics in Denver, Colorado in 1972 right after law trial in Kansas City against college in Warrensburg. Derived and improved from original that was given to a flower shop in South Bend in 1969 (appropriately, it looked like a plant).
- Circe, bronze bas-relief, 1961
- Vogue Maternal, 48" plaster relief, 1961
- Interlude (Ballerina), 1962. Plaster figure 38" high, done on television, Ch. 28, ABC, Elkhart "Art School of the Air" through influence of Josef Wrobel. Also did portrait of Bob Mejer on television. Christmas Theme was also done on television around that time.
- Vincivan, 1962. Plaster, life-size, as if drawing at a table
- Theo, 1962. Plaster, life-size seated figure
- Melanie, 1962. Plaster portrait, done on Elkhart television Ch. 28, of East Indian girl that Ted met on N.D. campus.
- Nativity, 1963. Mahogany, high relief, gave to Aunt Jo to donate to U.S.C. for Paul's benefit as a memory of her assistance in 1971 when we returned to Escondido from Warrensburg, MO.
- Don Quixote, 1965. Cast iron found pieces, head moves manually, making it seem that eyes come together.
- Oracle, 1965. 43" high. Cast iron found pieces, looks like upside down bird. Historically symbolizes entrails of birds which were read for prophecies.
- St. Joseph the Worker, 1965. 10' Limestone high relief for facade of renovated St. Joseph Church, South bend, IN. Ted donated his skills and a parishioner (Paul Krueper) donated the cost.
- Rock of Ages, 1965–66. Eight plaster models for Crypt Series to be finalized in marble: Prayerful Angel, Guardian Angel with Scroll, Christ and the Children, Gethsemane, Good Shepherd, Madonna and Child, Sacred Heart and Resurrection Project
- Versfeld, 1965. Plaster portrait of Martin Versfeld, Cape Town philosopher, teaching at Notre Dame on temporary assignment.
- Ieraci Monument, 1966. Marble and granite, at N.D. cemetery..
- St. John, 1967. Cast in bronze, over-life size, in Mexico. For Dedo and Nana's honor in Lorain, Ohio church.
- St. Patrick, 1967. Plaster sketch
- Equinoctial Point, 1967. 20" × 16" × 15" Marble, first 4-Dimensional sculpture using embedded prism. Shown in South Bend, IN. Art Center.
- Nativity, 1968. Limestone, for Cathedral of the Nativity church in Dubuque, Iowa
- Solar Cylinder, 1971. 14" dia. × 7" w. Acrylic resin, lycra, rubber, and sun spectra, done at Roswell
- Time's Color Arrow, 1971. Acrylic resin, done at Roswell.
- Sun Touchstone, 1972. 54" × 38" × 36" Acrylic resin mixed with black sand. Done at Roswell, shown at Sunspot, N.M.
- Testament Series, 1974–75. St. Paul, St. Joseph, St. Peter, and Song of David. Proposals for All Saints Mausoleum, Des Plaines, IL
- Spectral Emanations, 1976. 120" × 36" × 5" Scale model for crypt interior for Resurrection Mausoleum proposal. Des Plaines, IL
- Sun Slice, 1980. Scale model
- Solar Seize, 1980. Scale model
- Sun-Cube, 1988. 68" × 48" × 48" Scale model, evolving, diurnal spectra for Phoenix proposal
- Pad-a-Pod, 1988. assemblage of athletic knee pads and foam rubber
- Once-and-for-All, (The Passion), 1993. Steel, wire, wood.
- Swift-as-a-Swallow (Arundel), 1993. 21" × 21" × 10". Horse of the Knight Bevis, 3 p.m. culmination
- Johnny Appleseed, 1996. Still in clay maquette form.
- St. Francis (Canticle of the Sun), 1996. Still in clay maquette form
- The Passion, (Veil of Veronica). 1996. 20" × 17" × 7" Calligraphic shadow culmination at high noon
- Memory of a Dream (MLK), 1996. A Memorial Garden, Spectral stripe honors 1 of 4 events in life of MLK, JR
- PEACE PAVILION: 1997 (Scale model) Nobel Peace Laureates are honored by celestial/spectral markers
- Playground Proposals
- Multiple Drawings
