= Kale My Name =

Vegan restaurant in Chicago, Illinois, US

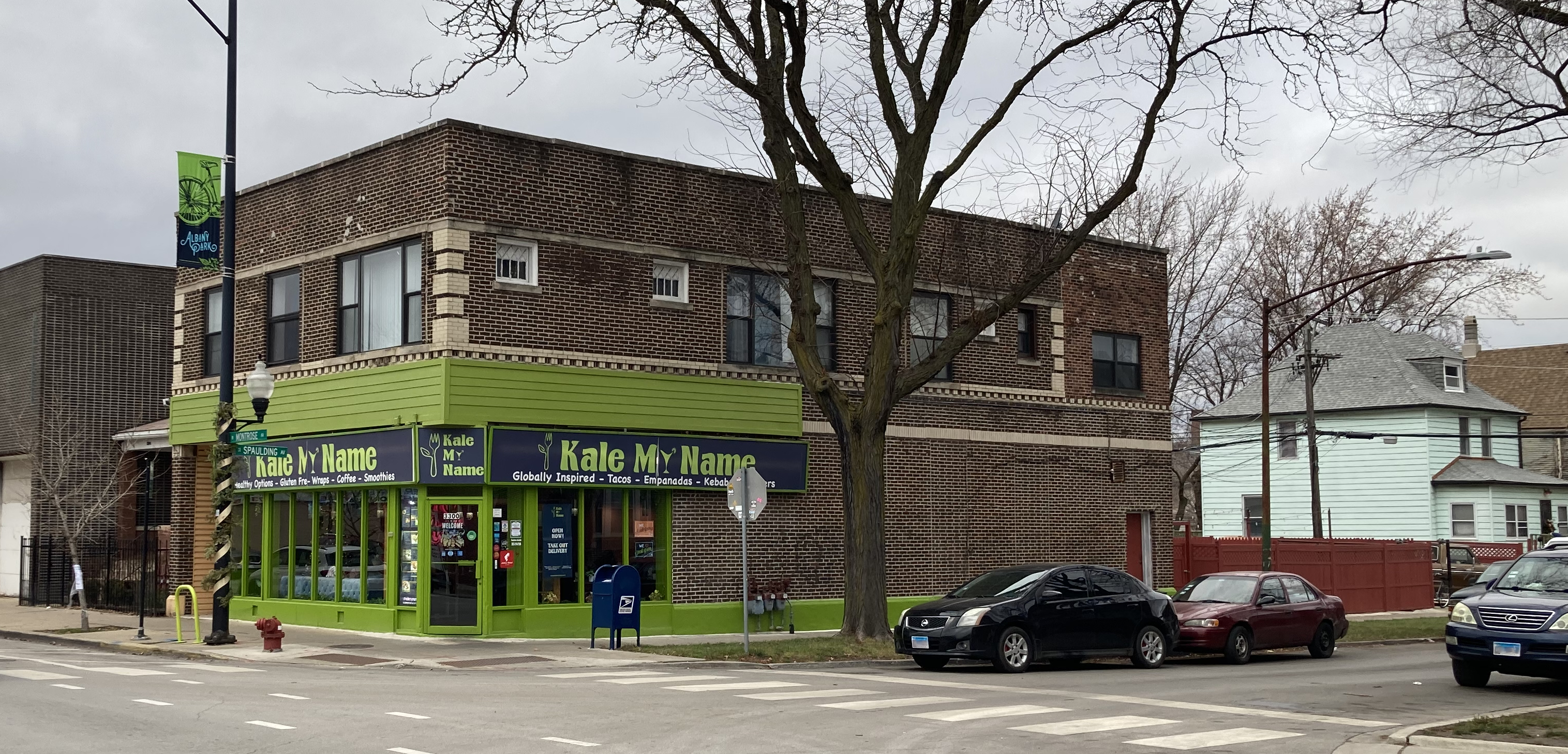
- Interactive map of Kale My Name

Restaurant information
- Established: 2020
- Food type: Vegan
- Location: 3300 W. Montrose Ave., Chicago, Cook, Illinois, 60618
- Coordinates: 41°57′41″N 87°42′39″W
- Website: www.kalemyname.com

Kale My Name is a vegan restaurant owned by Nemanja Golubovic. It was first opened in Chicago, Illinois, in 2020. After a year, a franchise in Los Angeles, California, was opened, which was co-owned by Tabitha Brown.

== Background ==
The restaurant's name, Kale My Name, was taken from the Destiny's Child song "Say My Name", which became popular in 1999. Golubovic was preparing for the menu while listening to that song and he thought that song title was very appealing.

Kale My Name is a restaurant chain popular for its 100% plant-based food products. Golubovic, adopted a brand mantra "vegan for the animals, for our health, and the earth".

The restaurant was founded in April 2020, as take-out and delivery during the pandemic. Later, it was transitioned into a dine-in restaurant. Being patronized and supported in Chicago, it ended up expanding to Los Angeles, California.

Tabitha Brown was a regular customer of the Kale My Name Chicago branch. Being impressed and fascinated with the taste of the vegan food in Kale My Name, she became Golubovic's friend and later a business partner/co-owner of the Los Angeles location.

It was recognized as a top vegan restaurant in Chicago by Top-Rated.online.

== Awards ==
- Restaurant Guru 2023 – Best Vegetarian Restaurant in Chicago
- Veggie Award 2022 Winner – Best Vegan Casual Restaurant in the Country, by VegNews Magazine
- Best of Chicago Award Winner – Best Vegan Restaurant, by Chicago Reader
- Best Brunch Winner in Chicago, by VegOut Magazine
- National Top Vegan Dog Award by PETA
