= Golubac (Mionica) =

Coordinates: 44.1914°N 20.0222°E

Golubac Голубац
- Village (Selo)
- Interactive map of Golubac
- Country: Serbia
- District: Kolubara
- Municipality: Mionica
- Time zone: UTC+1 (CET)
  - Summer (DST): UTC+2 (CEST)

Golubac is a village situated in Mionica municipality in Serbia.

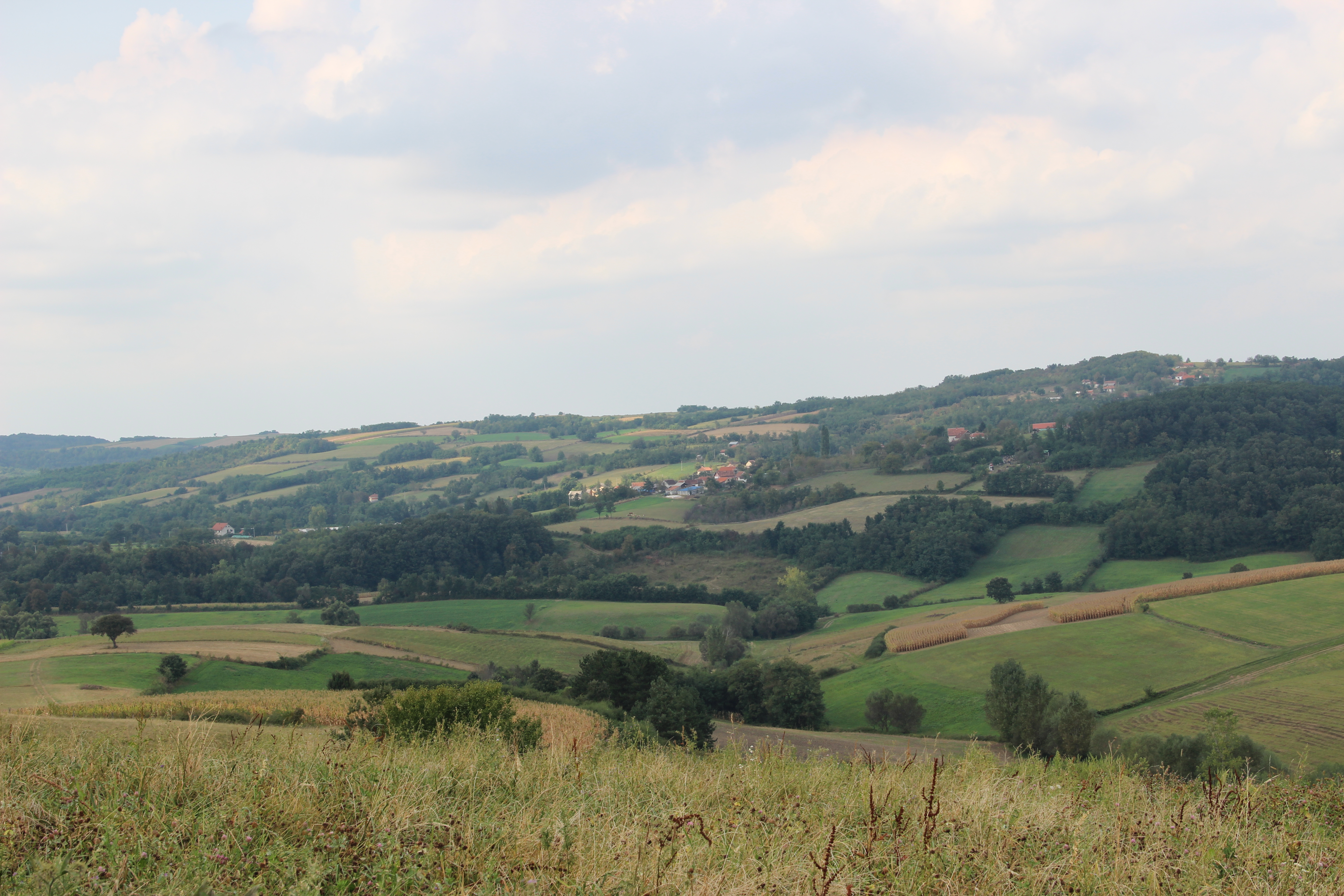
Golubac - panorama

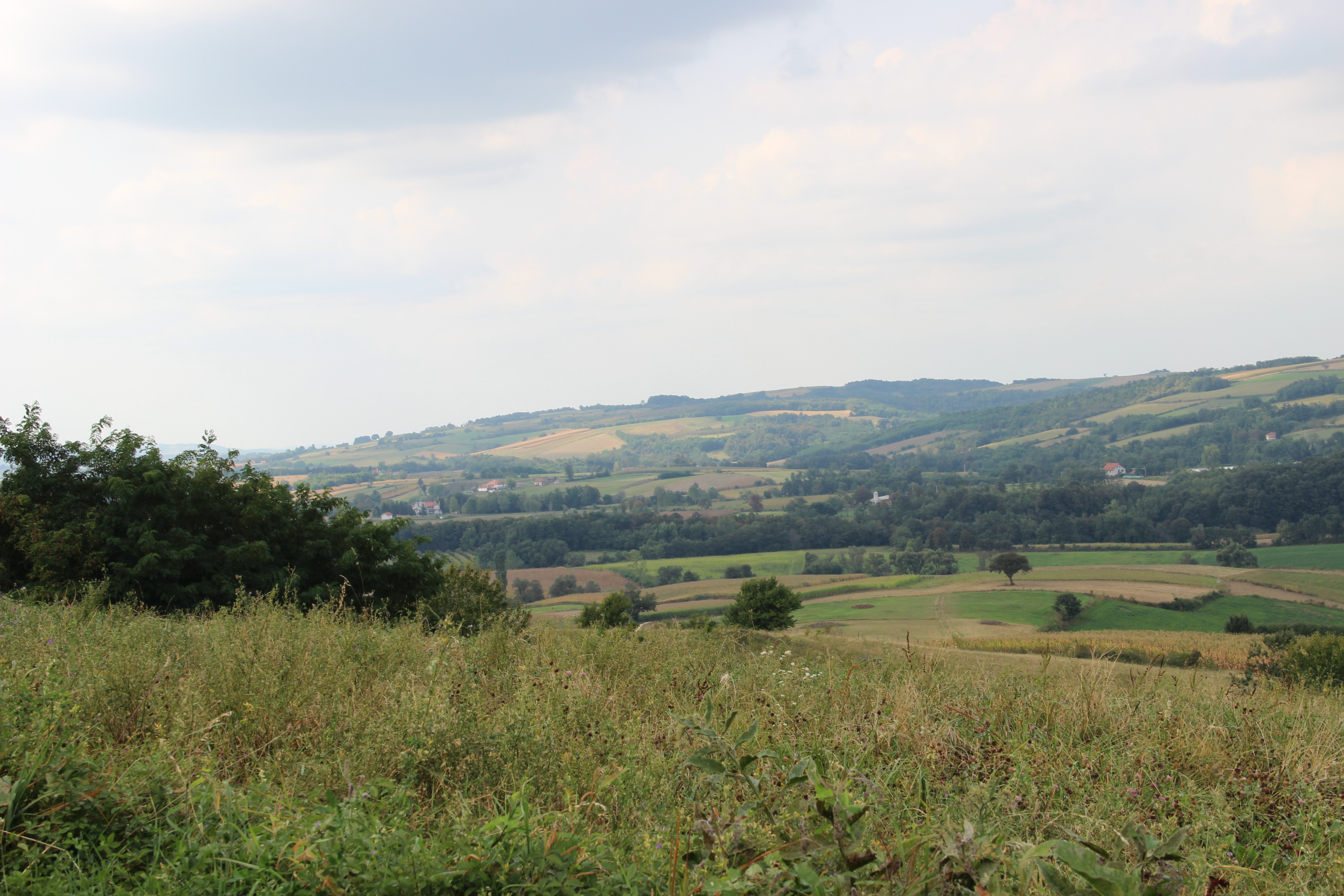
Golubac - panorama

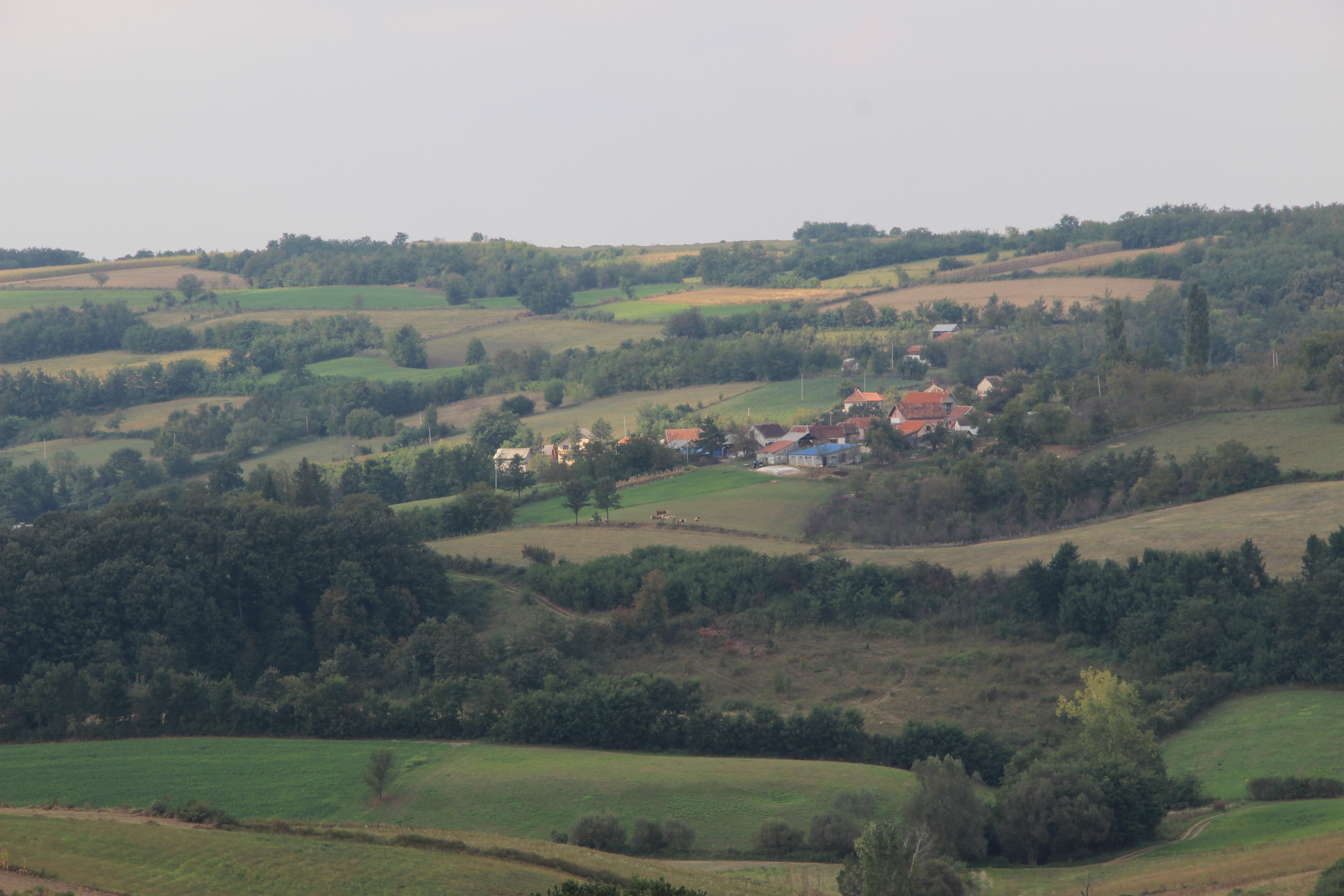
Golubac - panorama

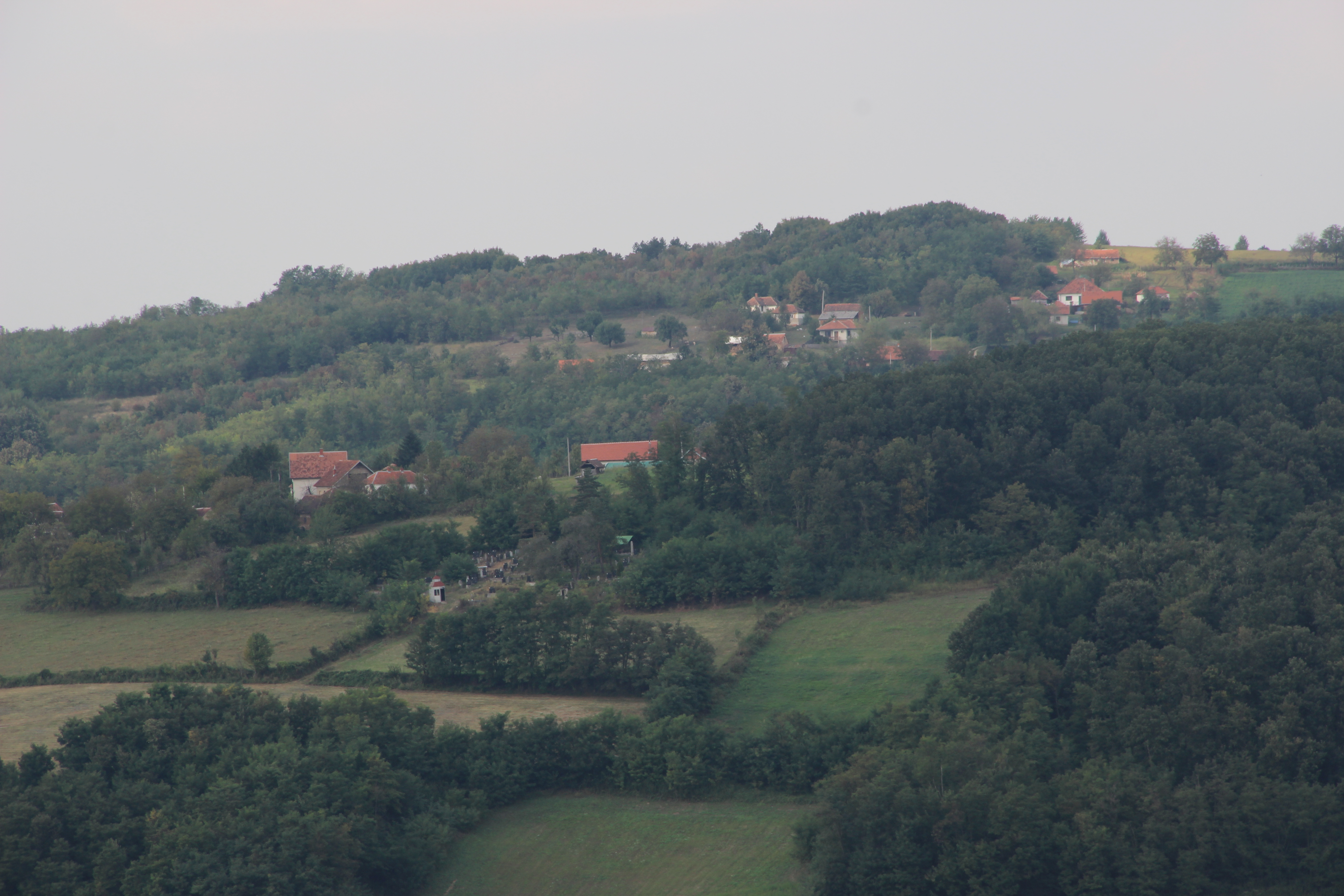
Golubac - panorama

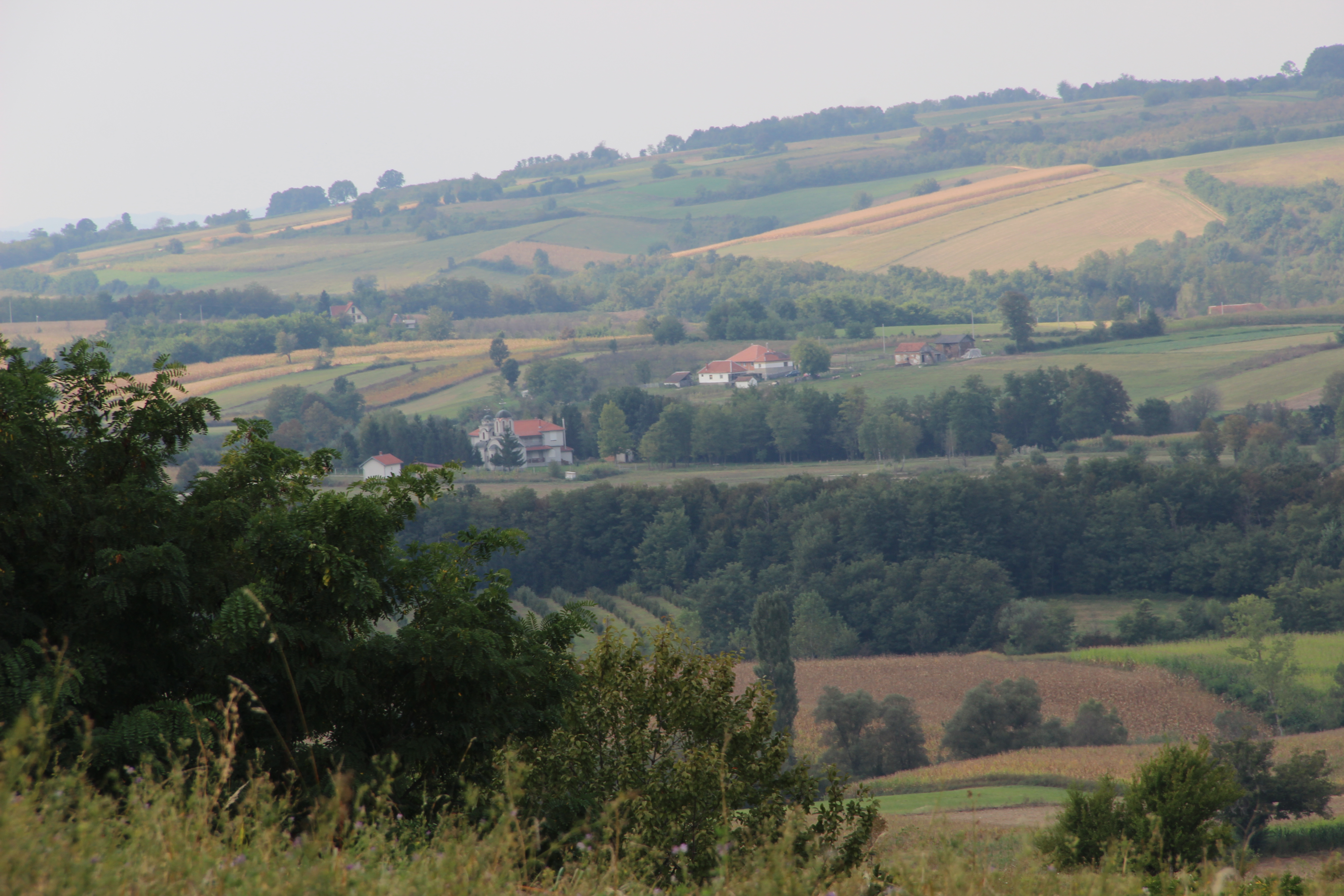
Golubac - panorama

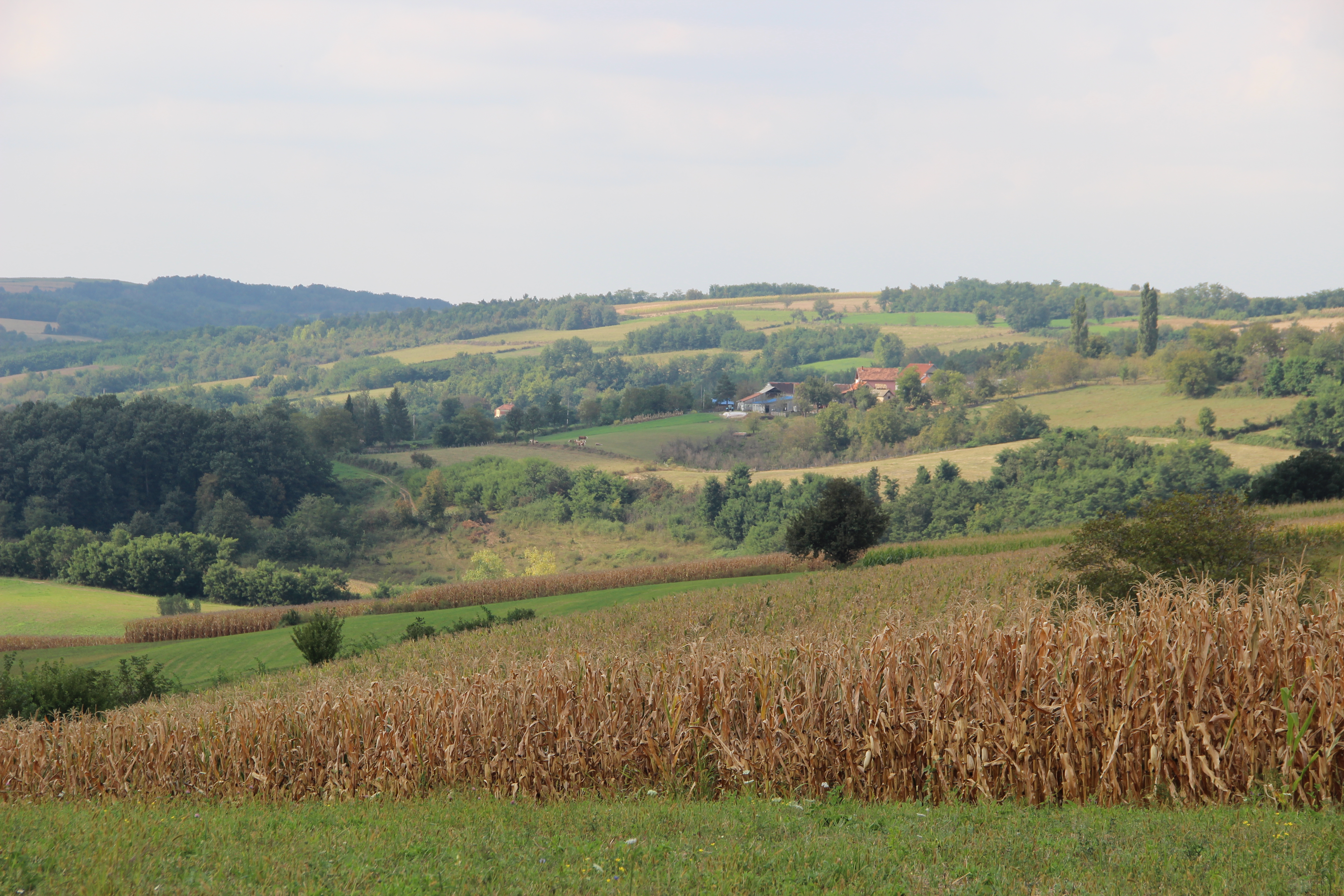
Golubac - panorama
