= Holub =

Holub (Czech and Slovak feminine: Holubová) is a Czech, Slovak and Ukrainian surname. Hołub is a Polish surname. The surname means pigeon or dove. It may have originated as a designation for a breeder or lover of pigeons, or based on the nature of the bearer (according to the saying "to brag like a pigeon" or according to the designation of a peaceful person "of a pigeon nature"). Notable people with the surname include:

== Sport ==
- Beata Hołub (born 1967), Polish high jumper
- Dick Holub (1921–2009), American basketball player and coach
- E. J. Holub (1938–2019), American football player
- Jan Hołub (born 1996), Polish swimmer
- Jan Holub (ice hockey) (born 1983), Czech ice hockey player
- Jan Holub I (1942–2018), Czech speedway rider
- Jan Holub II (born 1968), Czech speedway rider
- Jan Holub III (born 1991), Czech speedway rider
- Miloslava Holubová (born 1949), Czech tennis player
- Petra Holubová (born 1968), Czech tennis player
- Radim Holub (born 1975), Czech footballer
- Yury Holub (born 1996), Belarusian Paralympic cross-country skier and biathlete

== Other ==
- Achim Holub (born 1966), Austrian conductor
- Emil Holub (1847–1902), Czech medical doctor, explorer, cartographer and ethnographer
- Eva Holubová (born 1959), Czech actress
- Joan Holub (born 1956), American writer and illustrator
- Josef Ludwig Holub (1930–1999), Czech botanist
- Leo Holub (1916–2010), American photographer
- Miloslav Holub (1915–1999), Czech actor
- Miroslav Holub (1923–1998), Czech poet and immunologist
- Renate Holub (born 1946), German political philosopher and social theorist
- Robert C. Holub (1949–2023), American Germanist and university professor

== See also ==
- Vicki Hollub (born 1959), American businesswoman
- Małgorzata Hołub-Kowalik (born 1992), Polish sprinter
