= Rok Golob =

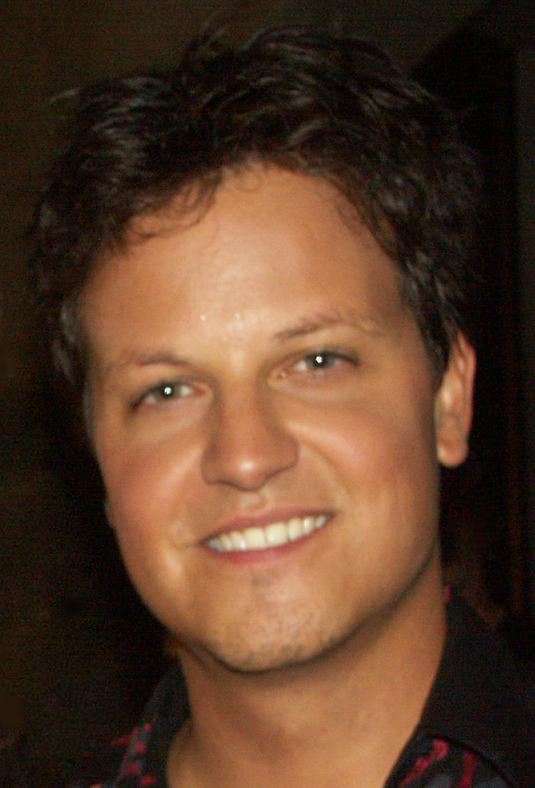
Rok Golob, slovenian composer

Rok Golob is a Slovenian composer, producer, conductor and multi-instrumentalist.

He has worked on over 60 CD projects, as well as for film, TV and radio. His very diverse styles of music include works for full symphony orchestra, choir, big-band, rock-pop-jazz bands/soloists and even concert bands. For various projects, he’s received 6 Golden Music Awards and 7 other awards from different countries. He’s worked with names like Gino Vannelli, Sting, Bjork, Bobby McFerrin, Elmer Bernstein, Martika, José Carreras, Vinnie Colaiuta, Luis Conte, Bendik Hofseth, Jimmy Haslip, Katia Moraes… Slovenian artists: Slovenian Philharmonic Orchestra, RTV Symphony Orchestra, Katrinas, Darja Švajger, Magnifico, Dan D, Neisha, Siddharta, Oto Pestner…
