= Bulić =

Bulić is a Serbo-Croatian surname. It may refer to:

- Bruno Bulić (born 1958), Yugoslav cyclist
- Frane Bulić (1846–1934), Croatian priest, archaeologist and historian
- Jerko Bulić (1924–2008), Yugoslav sprinter
- Karlo Bulić (1910–1986), Croatian actor
- Mate Bulić (born 1945), Croatian pop-folk singer
- Radosav Bulić (born 1977), Montenegrin football midfielder
- Rasim Bulić (born 2000), German footballer
- Vanja Bulić (born 1947), Serbian journalist and author

== See also ==
- Balić, surname
- Belić, surname
- Bilić (surname)
- Bolić, surname
