= Bolić =

Bolić is a Croatian surname, derived from the word bol, meaning "pain, ache". It may refer to:

- Dražen Bolić (born 1971), Serbian footballer
- Elvir Bolić (born 1971), Bosnian footballer
- Zlatko Bolić (born 1974), Serbian basketball player

== See also ==
- Balić, surname
- Belić, surname
- Bilić, surname
- Bulić, surname
