= Balići =

Balići may refer to:

- Balići, Serbia, a village near Prijepolje
- Balići, Novi Travnik, a village in Bosnia and Herzegovina
- Balići I, a village near Žminj, Croatia
- Balići II, a former village now part of Sutivanac, near Barban, Croatia

== See also ==
- Balić
