= Gokushovirales =

Virus classification
- (unranked): Virus
- Realm: Volvereviria
- Kingdom: Sangervirae
- Phylum: Phixviricota
- Class: Microviricetes
- Order: Gokushovirales

Order of viruses

Gokushovirales is an order of viruses in the class Microviricetes.

== Classification ==
The order contains the following families:

- Alphagokushoviridae
- Betagokushoviridae
- Groupodiviridae
- Pichoviridae
- Sukshmaviridae

== See also ==
- Bdellomicrovirus
- Chlamydiamicrovirus
- Spiromicrovirus
