= Chlamydiamicrovirus =

Virus classification
- (unranked): Virus
- Realm: Monodnaviria
- Kingdom: Sangervirae
- Phylum: Phixviricota
- Class: Malgrandaviricetes
- Order: Petitvirales
- Family: Microviridae
- Subfamily: Gokushovirinae
- Genus: Chlamydiamicrovirus

Genus of viruses

Chlamydiamicrovirus is a genus of viruses, in the family Microviridae, in the subfamily Gokushovirinae. Various species of Chlamydia serve as natural hosts. There are four species in this genus.

== Taxonomy ==
The following species are assigned to the genus:

- Chlamydiamicrovirus Chp1
- Chlamydiamicrovirus Chp2
- Chlamydiamicrovirus CPAR39
- Chlamydiamicrovirus CPG1

== Structure ==
Viruses in Chlamydiamicrovirus are non-enveloped, with icosahedral and round geometries, and T=1 symmetry. The diameter is around 30 nm. Genomes are circular, around 6.1 kb in length.

| Genus | Structure | Symmetry | Capsid | Genomic arrangement | Genomic segmentation |
|---|---|---|---|---|---|
| Chlamydiamicrovirus | Icosahedral | T=1 | Non-enveloped | Circular | Monopartite |

== Life cycle ==
Viral replication is cytoplasmic. Entry into the host cell is achieved by pilus-mediated adsorption into the host cell. Replication follows the ssDNA rolling circle model. DNA-templated transcription is the method of transcription. The virus exits the host cell by bacteria lysis. Various species of Chlamydia serve as the natural host. Transmission routes are passive diffusion.

| Genus | Host details | Tissue tropism | Entry details | Release details | Replication site | Assembly site | Transmission |
|---|---|---|---|---|---|---|---|
| Chlamydiamicrovirus | Enterobacteria: Chlamidia | None | Pilus adsorption | Lysis | Cytoplasm | Cytoplasm | Pilus |
