= Vladimir Sertić =

Vladimir Sertić (27 September 1901 – 10 March 1983) was a Croatian physician who pioneered virology and bacteriophage therapy. He worked in Félix d'Herelle's Laboratoire du Bactériophage in Paris in 1928 and served as its scientific director. He worked on bacteriophage classification and isolated many strains including φX174 in collaboration with Nikolai Boulgakov.

Sertić was born in Gorica, a hamlet of Sutivanac, Istria, at the time in the Austro-Hungarian Empire. His father was an army physician. He too studied medicine at the University of Zagreb School of Medicine from 1919. He graduated in 1925 and joined the institute for experimental pathology in Zagreb. Here he was involved in immunobiology under the supervision of Miroslav Mikuličić. In 1929 he wrote about bacteriophages causing lysis of Escherichia coli. He went to Paris to work at the Laboratoire du Bactériophage that was run privately by Felix d'Herelle. Along with Boulgakov he was involved in examining phages from waste waters. He developed a naming system for bacteriophages. The names began with Greek alphabets that defined if the phage was specific to a bacteria or acted against multiple ones (φ) and was followed by a roman numeral between I and XIV defining the antigenic reaction followed by a numeral that was based on isolates used for cross-neutralization tests. He worked there until he was forced to return home by World War II in 1939. He was mobilized into the army and was captured and held prisoner by the Nazi army but released to the Croatian state. He returned to Zagreb and joined the school of medicine and was made a professor in 1941. Two years later he suffered from various physical and mental ailments and was forced to retire. He was taken care of by his sister and he died in obscurity.
