= Spiromicrovirus =

Virus classification
- (unranked): Virus
- Realm: Volvereviria
- Kingdom: Sangervirae
- Phylum: Phixviricota
- Class: Microviricetes
- Order: Gokushovirales
- Genus: Spiromicrovirus

Genus of viruses

Spiromicrovirus is a genus of viruses, in the family Alphagokushoviridae. Spiroplasma bacteria serve as natural hosts. There is only one species in this genus: Spiromicrovirus SpV4.

== Structure ==
Viruses in Spiromicrovirus are non-enveloped, with icosahedral and round geometries, and T=1 symmetry. The diameter is around 30 nm. Genomes are circular, around 6.1kb in length.

| Genus | Structure | Symmetry | Capsid | Genomic arrangement | Genomic segmentation |
|---|---|---|---|---|---|
| Spiromicrovirus | Icosahedral | T=1 | Non-enveloped | Circular | Monopartite |

== Life cycle ==
Viral replication is cytoplasmic. Entry into the host cell is achieved by pilus-mediated adsorption into the host cell. Replication follows the ssDNA rolling circle model. DNA-templated transcription is the method of transcription. The virus exits the host cell by bacteria lysis. Spiroplasma bacteria serve as the natural host.

| Genus | Host details | Tissue tropism | Entry details | Release details | Replication site | Assembly site | Transmission |
|---|---|---|---|---|---|---|---|
| Spiromicrovirus | Bacteria: spiroplasma | None | Pilus adsorption | Lysis | Cytoplasm | Cytoplasm | Pilus |
