= Belich =

Belich is the name of:

- Camilla Belich, New Zealand lawyer and politician
- James Belich (historian) (born 1956), New Zealand historian
- Sir Jim Belich (1927–2015), mayor of Wellington
- T. James Belich (born 1976), playwright, also known by pseudonym of Colorado Tolston

== See also ==
- Belić
