= Grandići, Istria County =

Grandići Grandici
- Village
- Location within Croatia
- Coordinates: 45.0638471°N 13.9510282°E
- Country: Croatia
- County: Istria
- Municipality: Barban

Area
  - Total: 5.6 km^{2} (2.2 sq mi)

Population (2021)
  - Total: 122
  - Density: 22/km^{2} (56/sq mi)
- Time zone: UTC+1 (CET)
  - Summer (DST): UTC+2 (CEST)
- Postal code: 52207
- Area code: 052

Grandići (Italian: Grandici) is a village in Istria, Croatia. According to the 2021 census, the village had a population of 122 people.
