= Rojnići =

Rojnići Roinici
- Village
- Location within Croatia
- Coordinates: 45.0951136°N 13.9393087°E
- Country: Croatia
- County: Istria
- Municipality: Barban

Area
  - Total: 1.5 sq mi (3.8 km^{2})

Population (2021)
  - Total: 47
  - Density: 32/sq mi (12/km^{2})
- Time zone: UTC+1 (CET)
  - Summer (DST): UTC+2 (CEST)
- Postal code: 52207 Barban
- Area code: 052

Rojnići (Italian: Roinici) is a village in Istria, Croatia.

== Demographics ==
According to the 2021 census, its population was 47.
