= Bullavirales =

Virus classification
- (unranked): Virus
- Realm: Volvereviria
- Kingdom: Sangervirae
- Phylum: Phixviricota
- Class: Microviricetes
- Order: Bullavirales

Order of viruses

Bullavirales is an order of viruses in the class Microviricetes.

== Classification ==
The order contains the following families and genera (-viridae denotes family and -virus denotes genus):

- Eubullaviridae
  - Alphatrevirus
  - Gequatrovirus
  - Sinsheimervirus
  - Vimicrovirus
- Pequenoviridae
  - Pseudophixvirus
- Piccoloviridae
  - Paraphixvirus
- Piticuviridae
  - Periphixvirus
