= Petehi =

Petehi Petechi
- Village
- Location within Croatia
- Coordinates: 45.0800602°N 13.9439129°E
- Country: Croatia
- County: Istria
- Municipality: Barban

Area
  - Total: 1.4 sq mi (3.6 km^{2})

Population (2021)
  - Total: 90
  - Density: 65/sq mi (25/km^{2})
- Time zone: UTC+1 (CET)
  - Summer (DST): UTC+2 (CEST)
- Postal code: 52207 Barban
- Area code: 052

Petehi (Italian: Petechi) is a village in Istria, Croatia.

== Demographics ==
According to the 2021 census, its population was 90.
