= Koromani =

Koromani Golzana
- Village
- Location within Croatia
- Coordinates: 45.0943948°N 13.9927091°E
- Country: Croatia
- County: Istria
- Municipality: Barban

Area
  - Total: 0.58 sq mi (1.5 km^{2})

Population (2021)
  - Total: 50
  - Density: 86/sq mi (33/km^{2})
- Time zone: UTC+1 (CET)
  - Summer (DST): UTC+2 (CEST)
- Postal code: 52207 Barban
- Area code: 052

Koromani (Italian: Golzana) is a village in Istria, Croatia.

== Demographics ==
According to the 2021 census, its population was 50.
