= Barban =

Barban Barbana, Barbon
- Municipality
- Barban Municipality; Općina Barban
- Flag

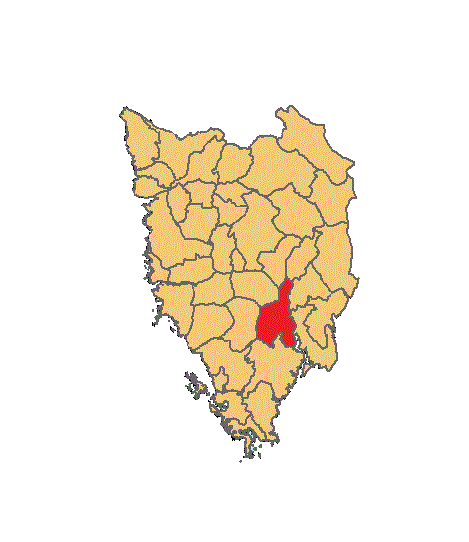
- Location of Barban municipality in Istria
- Interactive map of Barban
- Location within Croatia
- Coordinates: 45°06′N 14°01′E
- Country: Croatia
- County: Istria County

Government
  - Municipal mayor: Dalibor Paus (IDS)

Area
  - Municipality: 90.5 km^{2} (34.9 sq mi)
  - Urban: 4.0 km^{2} (1.5 sq mi)
- Elevation: 229 m (751 ft)

Population (2021)
  - Municipality: 2,491
  - Density: 27.5/km^{2} (71.3/sq mi)
  - Urban: 218
  - Urban density: 54/km^{2} (140/sq mi)
- Time zone: UTC+1 (CET)
  - Summer (DST): UTC+2 (CEST)
- Postal code: 52207 Barban
- Area code: 52
- Website: barban.hr

Barban (Italian: Barbana, Čakavian Barbon, or Brban) is a small town and municipality in the southern part of eastern Istria, Croatia.

The municipality of Barban covers an area of around 100 km^{2} and contains 23 settlements with a total of 2,491 people.

== History ==
The site of a Bronze Age prehistoric hill fort, human remains have been found on the site that dates back approximately 3,400-4,000 years back. The name Barban appears for the first time in an ecclesiastic document dated 740 A.D. In the Middle Ages, the town was fortified while under control of feudal lords from Pazin, and parts of those medieval fortifications can still be seen. In the second half of the 13th century, having been depopulated by the plague in 1312, a small colony of Dalmatians from Finodol settled in the area, brought by the counts of Gorizia.

In 1374, upon the death of Albert IV, Count of Pazin, it became a full Habsburg possession, before being taken over by the Republic of Venice in the 16th century. The noble Loredan family of Venice bought Barban from the Counts of Pazin in 1535, and owned it until the abolition of feudal rights in 1869, along with Rakalj.

In the main square, which is reached by passing through Velika Vrata (the Great Gate, 1718), stands the St. Nicholas parish church with baroque altars and paintings by Venetian masters from the 16th-18th centuries, a Late Gothic stone tabernacle, and wooden baroque sculptures.

== Demographics ==
In 2021, the municipality had 2,491 residents in the following 23 settlements:

- Barban, population 218
- Bičići, population 69
- Borinići, population 5
- Draguzeti, population 75
- Glavani, population 77
- Grandići, population 122
- Hrboki, population 159
- Jurićev Kal, population 44
- Koromani, population 50
- Kožljani, population 49
- Manjadvorci, population 165
- Melnica, population 175
- Orihi, population 101
- Petehi, population 90
- Prhati, population 135
- Puntera, population 67
- Rajki, population 6
- Rebići, population 118
- Rojnići, population 47
- Sutivanac, population 333
- Šajini, population 175
- Vadreš, population 56
- Želiski, population 155
Barban: Population trends 1857–2021
v

population	2123	2614	2771	2745	2932	3418	3899	4320	4300	4291	4107	3561	3014	2983	2802	2721	2491
	1857	1869	1880	1890	1900	1910	1921	1931	1948	1953	1961	1971	1981	1991	2001	2011	2021

Sources: Croatian Bureau of Statistics publications

In 2011, out of 2,721 people, 75% were Croats. The town of Barban itself had a population of 221.

== Prstenac tournament ==
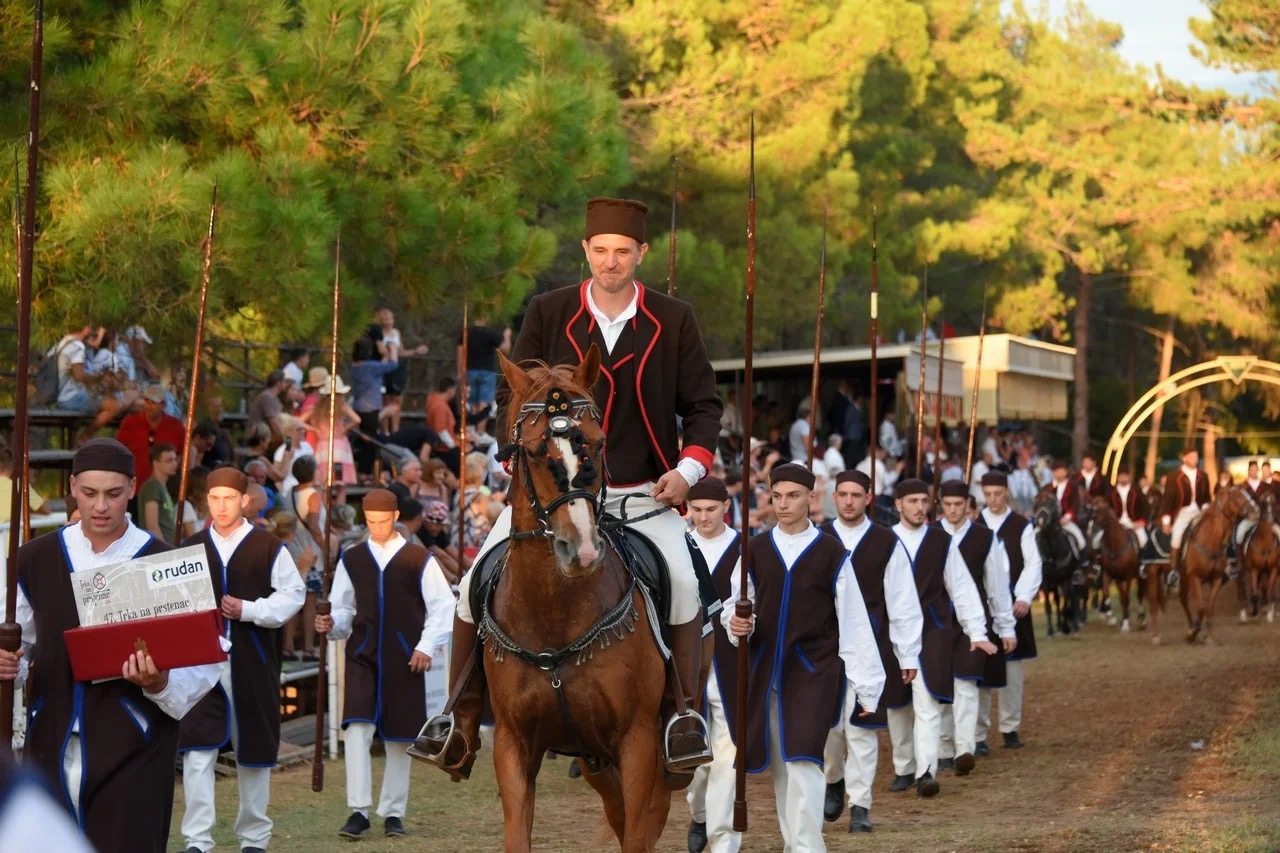
One of the knights in the Race of the Ring, 2022

The Race of the Ring (Croatian: Trka na Prstenac) is a traditional equestrian competition held every August in the town of Barban. It dates back to the 17th century, when, during the local fair on Pentecost, 10 June 1696, Francesco Loredan, the feudal lord of Barban, organised a knightly competition in ring shooting. It is believed the competition was instituted in order to reinforce chivalric values, encourage loyalty to Venice, and promote public entertainment. At the time, the race continued to be organised annually under the patronage of the Loredan lords, and may have been inspired by similar tournaments in Venice or in Dalmatian cities. The competition also served as a form of military training and local celebration of feudal loyalty to the Loredans.

The race, modelled on medieval knightly tournaments, still continues today. Horsemen in traditional folk costumes gallop at full speed toward a metal ring (the prstenac), suspended on a wire, and attempt to pierce its center with a spear. The ring is divided into sections with different point values, and the goal is to score the most points in three attempts. The event is a major cultural festival, accompanied by parades, folk dancing, music, local crafts, and traditional food. It remains one of the most important manifestations of Istrian identity and heritage. In 2024, it was attended by the President of Croatia.

== Sources ==
- Trka na prstenac (in Croatian)
