= Sue Wickner =

American biochemist and geneticist

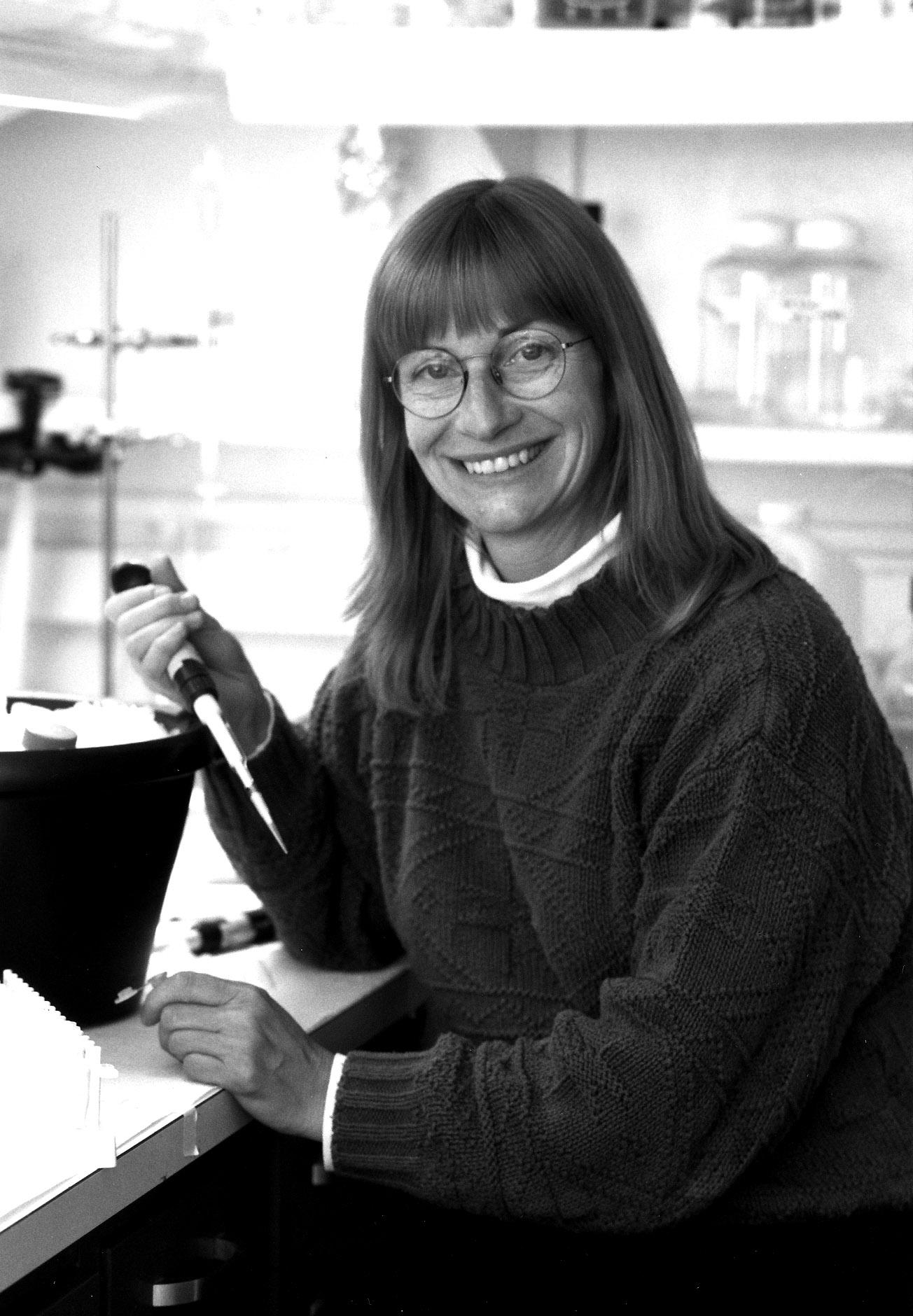
Wickner at the National Institutes of Health in 1995

Sue Hengren Wickner is an American biochemist and geneticist who is a distinguished investigator and the head of the DNA Molecular Biology section of the National Institutes of Health. Her laboratory is under the National Cancer Institute and is located in the Center for Cancer Research (NCI/CCR).

== Education ==
Sue earned the B.S. degree from American University and the M.S. from Georgetown University. She studied at the Corcoran School of Art and went on to earn her Ph.D. in 1973 from Albert Einstein College of Medicine of Yeshiva University. Her dissertation advisor there was Jerard Hurwitz. She pursued postdoctoral training at National Institutes of Health with Martin Gellert, then joined the Laboratory of Molecular Biology at the National Cancer Institute. She did a sabbatical with Fred Sanger at the MRC in Cambridge UK in 1983.

== Research ==
Sue Wickner and her coauthors Michel Wright, Reed Wickner and Jerry Hurwitz published an early paper showing DNA replication in the test tube. They found that the bacterial virus or phage Phi X174 could be converted from single stranded to the double stranded replicative form in the test tube and that the reaction required the gene products of dnaC, dnaE, and dnaG genes of the phage. At NIH, her research has illuminated the action of proteins that utilize adenosine triphosphate (ATP) energy in tiny machines to replicate DNA, remodel proteins, and break down proteins. She has been a major contributor to the understanding of molecular chaperones, proteins that regulate most cellular processes including replication and transcription and response to stress. Chaperones function to alter activity, refold as well as degrade proteins. Her citation from election to the National Academy of Sciences notes her most recent contributions to ATP-dependent chaperones for proteolysis (protein breakdown), showing how they participate in stress responses by removing proteins that folded incorrectly and how they degrade regulatory proteins once their signals have been delivered. Since there are some human diseases that result from abnormally folded and/or aggregated proteins, these ATP-dependent chaperones are important in disease treatment development.

== Honors and awards ==
- National Academy of Sciences Member, 2004
- American Academy of Arts and Science Member, 2002
- American Association for the Advancement of Science Fellow, 2001

== Books ==
- Lila Gierasch, Arthur Horwich, Christine Slingsby, Sue Wickner, and David Agard. (2016) Structure And Action Of Molecular Chaperones: Machines That Assist Protein Folding In The Cell World Scientific Publishing Company Pte Ltd, ISBN 9789814749329.

== Selected works ==
- Wickramaratne, AC; Wickner, S; Kravats, AN (2024). "Hsp90, a team player in protein quality control and the stress response in bacteria". Microbiol Mol Biol Rev. 88 (2) e00176-22: e0017622. doi:10.1128/mmbr.00176-22. PMC 11332350. PMID 38534118.
- Wickramaratne, AC; Liao, JY; Doyle, SM; Hoskins, JR; Puller, G; Scott, ML; Alao, JP; Obaseki, I; Dinan, JC; Maity, TK; Jenkins, LM; Kravats, AN; Wickner, S (2023). "Proteins form Binary Complexes with Hsp90 and Ternary Complexes with Hsp90 and Hsp70". J Mol Biol. 435 (17): 168–184. doi:10.1016/j.jmb.2023.168184. PMC 10527347. PMID 37348754.
- Wickramaratne, A; Wickner, S (2023). "Diptoindonesin G, a new Hsp90 drug". J Biol Chem. 299 (1) 102826. doi:10.1016/j.jbc.2022.102826. PMC 9841029. PMID 36572186.
- Wickner, S; Nguyen, TL; Genest, O (2021). "The Bacterial Hsp90 Chaperone: Cellular Functions and Mechanism of Action". Annu Rev Microbiol. 75: 719–739. doi:10.1146/annurev-micro-032421-035644. PMID 34375543.
- Genest, O; Wickner, S; Doyle, SM (2019). "Hsp90 and Hsp70 chaperones: Collaborators in protein remodeling". J Biol Chem. 294 (6): 2109–2120. Bibcode:2019JBiCh.294.2109G. doi:10.1074/jbc.REV118.002806. PMC 6369297. PMID 30401745.
- Kravats, A. N.; Doyle, S. M.; Hoskins, J.R.; Genest, O.; Doody, E.; Wickner, S. (2017). "Interaction of E. coli Hsp90 with DnaK involves the DnaJ binding region of DnaK". Journal of Molecular Biology. 429 (6): 858–872. doi:10.1016/j.jmb.2016.12.014. PMC 5357148. PMID 28013030.
- Reidy, M.; Street, T.O.; Hoskins, J.R.; Camberg, J.L.; Agard, D.A.; Masison, D.C.; Wickner, S. (2013). "Uncovering a region of heat shock protein 90 important for client binding in E. coli and chaperone function in yeast". Mol. Cell. 49 (3): 464–473. doi:10.1016/j.molcel.2012.11.017. PMC 3570620. PMID 23260660.
- Doyle, S. M.; Genest, O.; Wickner, S. (2013). "Protein rescue from aggregates by powerful molecular chaperone machines". Nat Rev Mol Cell Biol. 14 (10): 617–629. doi:10.1038/nrm3660. PMID 24061228.
- Miot, M.; Reidy, M.; Doyle, S.M.; Hoskins, J.R.; Johnston, D.M.; Genest, O.; Masison, D.C.; Wickner, S. (2011). "Species-specific collaboration of heat shock proteins (Hsp)70 and 100 in thermotolerance and protein disaggregation". Proc. Natl. Acad. Sci. USA. 108 (17): 6915–6920. Bibcode:2011PNAS..108.6915M. doi:10.1073/pnas.1102828108. PMC 3084080. PMID 21474779.
- Genest, O.; Hoskins, J.R.; Camberg, J.L.; Doyle, S.M.; Wickner, S. (2011). "Heat shock protein 90 from Escherichia coli collaborates with the DnaK chaperone system in client protein remodeling". Proc Natl Acad Sci U S A. 108 (20): 8206–11. Bibcode:2011PNAS..108.8206G. doi:10.1073/pnas.1104703108. PMC 3100916. PMID 21525416.
- Wickner, S. (1978). "DNA Replication Proteins of Escherichia coli". Annu Rev Biochem. 78: 1163–1191. doi:10.1146/annurev.bi.47.070178.005503. PMID 354492.
