= Hrboki =

Hrboki Cherbochi
- Village
- Location within Croatia
- Coordinates: 45.0320826°N 13.9977478°E
- Country: Croatia
- County: Istria
- Municipality: Barban

Area
  - Total: 2.8 sq mi (7.2 km^{2})

Population (2021)
  - Total: 159
  - Density: 57/sq mi (22/km^{2})
- Time zone: UTC+1 (CET)
  - Summer (DST): UTC+2 (CEST)
- Postal code: 52207 Barban
- Area code: 052

Hrboki (Italian: Cherbochi) is a village in Istria, Croatia.

== Demographics ==
According to the 2021 census, its population was 159.
