= Robert L. Sinsheimer =

American biophysicist and academic administrator

- Born: Robert Louis Sinsheimer; February 5, 1920; Washington, D.C., U.S.
- Died: April 22, 2017 (aged 97); Santa Barbara, California, U.S.
- Education: Massachusetts Institute of Technology (BS, MS, PhD)
- Known for: Work on φX174 bacteriophage Demonstration of single-stranded DNA genomes Replicative form of viral DNA
- Awards: National Academy of Sciences (1967); National Academy of Medicine (1974); University of California Presidential Medal (2001)
- Scientific career
- Fields: Biophysics, molecular biology
- Workplaces: Iowa State University; California Institute of Technology; University of California, Santa Cruz; University of California, Santa Barbara

Robert Louis Sinsheimer (February 5, 1920 – April 22, 2017) was an American biophysicist, molecular biologist, and academic administrator. He is known for research on the bacteriophage φX174, including work that established its DNA as single-stranded and helped define its replicative form, and for later scientific leadership in debates over recombinant DNA and the early development of the idea of the Human Genome Project. He served as chancellor of the University of California, Santa Cruz from 1977 to 1987.

== Early life and education ==
Sinsheimer was born in Washington, D.C., and grew up in Chicago. In 1936, at age 16, he entered the Massachusetts Institute of Technology, initially intending to study chemical engineering but instead joining a newly established five-year program in quantitative biology and biological engineering that led to combined S.B. and S.M. degrees, which he received in 1941. His plans for further study were interrupted by World War II, during which he worked on aircraft radar at MIT's Radiation Laboratory. After the war, he returned to MIT for graduate study in biophysics, earning his Ph.D. in 1949. He briefly taught at MIT before joining Iowa State College in 1949.

== Career and research ==
At Iowa State, Sinsheimer worked on nucleic acids and viruses and developed biochemical methods for analyzing DNA components and sequence fragments. In 1957 he joined the faculty of the California Institute of Technology as professor of biophysics.

Sinsheimer's best-known scientific work centered on bacteriophage φX174, which he chose in part because it was one of the smallest known bacterial viruses and therefore experimentally tractable. In 1959 he reported that the DNA of φX174 was single-stranded, an unexpected result at a time when double-stranded DNA was the dominant model for genetic material.

He and Alice Burton later showed that the replicative form of φX174 DNA behaved as a closed circular molecule. The φX174 system became an important model for studies of viral replication, gene organization, and DNA synthesis.

In a 1957 Science article, written while he was still at Iowa State, Sinsheimer argued that biology had entered the early stages of a "genetic chemistry", by which the chemical basis of heredity could be analyzed directly. He later collaborated with Arthur Kornberg and colleagues on the enzymatic synthesis of infective φX174 DNA in vitro, a result widely publicized in 1967 as a major step in experimental molecular biology.

Later work on φX174 in Sinsheimer's laboratory included genetic mapping and restriction-fragment analysis. The phage also became the template for the first complete DNA genome sequence, carried out by Frederick Sanger and coworkers in 1977, with prior physical and genetic work on φX174 having laid much of the groundwork for that achievement.

== Scientific leadership and public policy ==
Sinsheimer was one of the founding editors of the Journal of Molecular Biology and later served as editor-in-chief of the Proceedings of the National Academy of Sciences beginning in 1972.

During the late 1960s and 1970s, he became active in public discussion of the scientific and social implications of molecular genetics and recombinant DNA. A Caltech oral history describes his participation in the Asilomar Conference on Recombinant DNA, his concern over biohazards, and his broader interest in the ethical consequences of new genetic technologies.

Sinsheimer also played an early role in discussions that led toward the Human Genome Project. In 1985 he convened a meeting at UC Santa Cruz to discuss the feasibility of sequencing the human genome, an event later described by UC Santa Cruz as an early step toward the project.

== University of California, Santa Cruz ==
In 1977 Sinsheimer left Caltech to become the second chancellor of the University of California, Santa Cruz, serving until 1987. During his tenure, the campus expanded its academic programs and graduate enrollment, added an undergraduate major in computer engineering, and developed new research activity in several fields, including linguistics, high-energy physics, seismology, agroecology, and applied economics.

After leaving Santa Cruz, he joined the faculty of the University of California, Santa Barbara, where he became professor emeritus in 1990.

== Honors ==
Sinsheimer was elected to the National Academy of Sciences in 1967. He received the California Scientist of the Year Award in 1968. Sinsheimer was elected to the National Academy of Medicine in 1974. In 2001 he received the University of California Presidential Medal for his contributions to scholarship and higher education.
