= Belić =

Belić (Serbian Cyrillic: Белић) is a Serbo-Croatian surname, derived from the word belo (Serbian Cyrillic: бело), meaning "white". It may refer to:

- Aleksandar Belić (1876–1960), Serbian linguist
- Branislav Belić (1932–2016), Serbian politician
- Danilo Belić (born 1980), Serbian football player
- Dušan Belić (born 1971), Serbian football goalkeeper
- James Belich (1927–2015), New Zealand politician
- James Belich (born 1956), New Zealand historian
- Jordanka Belić (born 1964), Serbian and German chess grandmaster
- Kristijan Belić (born 2001), Serbian professional footballer
- Luka Belić (born 1988), Croatian tennis player
- Luka Belić (born 1996), Serbian football forward
- Milan Belić (born 1977), Serbian football forward
- Miroslav Belić (1940–2020), Serbian lawyer and basketball player
- Nemanja Belić (born 1987), Serbian footballer
- Roko Belic (born 1971), American film director, producer, cinematographer, and actor
- Svetomir Belić (1946–2002), Serbian former boxer
- Tomáš Belic (born 1978), Slovak footballer

== In popular culture ==
- Niko Bellic, a character in a video game Grand Theft Auto IV

== See also ==
- Belich
- Bijelić, surname
- Balić, surname
- Bilić (surname)
