= Draguzeti =

Draguzeti Dragosetti
- Village
- Location within Croatia
- Coordinates: 45.0844535°N 13.9664341°E
- Country: Croatia
- County: Istria
- Municipality: Barban

Area
  - Total: 0.46 sq mi (1.2 km^{2})

Population (2021)
  - Total: 75
  - Density: 160/sq mi (62/km^{2})
- Time zone: UTC+1 (CET)
  - Summer (DST): UTC+2 (CEST)
- Postal code: 52207 Barban
- Area code: 052

Draguzeti (Italian: Dragosetti) is a village in Istria, Croatia.

== Demographics ==
According to the 2021 census, its population was 75.
