= Bijelić =

Bijelić is a Serbo-Croatian surname, derived from the word bijelo meaning "white" (Ijekavian form). It may refer to:

- Jovan Bijelić
- Severin Bijelić
- Martin Bijelić

== See also ==
- Belić, surname
- Bjelić, surname
- Bilić (surname)
- Bijelići, toponym
