= Evo (AI) =

AI family trained on genomic DNA

- Developers: Arc Institute; Stanford University; University of California, Berkeley
- Release: February 27, 2024; 2 years ago
- Written in: Python
- Type: Foundation model; Generative pre-trained transformer
- License: Open source
- Website: arcinstitute.org/tools/evo

Evo is a line of AI models designed to process and generate genomic sequences. First developed by researchers at the Arc Institute, Stanford and UC Berkeley, Evo models have been trained on DNA sequences. Evo models are open source.

The first version of Evo 1 was released as v.0.1.1 on February 27, 2024. The most recent version, which was released on February 28, 2026, is Evo 2 20B which is a version of Evo 2 with a reduced footprint so that it will run on a single H100 GPU. The datasets used for training Evo 1 and 2 were OpenGenome1 and OpenGenome2 respectively. The first dataset was 300 billion base pairs of bacteria and phage DNA. The second was over 26 times larger, with 8.8 trillion base pairs covering all forms of life.

In 2026, a paper was published in Science detailing the use of Evo to generate complete genomes for new bacteriophage viruses which were more effective in some ways than their natural equivalents. This capability to design and generate viral genomes was thought to be a significant safety risk.

== Architecture and training ==
Evo operates as a multi-modal genomic language model for analyzing and predicting the function of the programmed DNA, RNA and proteins. This is different from previous biological models that specialized only in gene expression prediction or protein folding, such as AlphaFold. Evo uses a deep learning model called the StripedHyena architecture with state-space models (SSMs) and signal processing operators for long-context sequence modeling.

Evo 1 had a context window of 131,072 (128k) base pairs, which is significantly more than earlier genomic transformers which were typically limited to about 8,000 base pairs. It was initially trained on OpenGenome, which is a dataset comprising roughly 300 billion nucleotides derived from millions of prokaryote and bacteriophage genomes.

In 2025, the Arc Institute and its collaborators introduced Evo 2, an expanded foundation model with 40 billion parameters.

Evo 2 was trained on the 8.8 trillion base pairs in the curated dataset, OpenGenome2, covering all forms of life including eukaryotes. It expanded the model context window to a million base pairs (1 megabase) at single-nucleotide resolution, allowing prediction for cases which were not specifically trained (zero-shot) for human non-coding variants, BRCA1 disease mutations, and chromatin accessibility patterns.

Evo's co-design capability has generated matching protein and RNA sequences simultaneously. Researchers used Evo models to design novel CRISPR systems, such as EvoCas9-1 which, despite sharing only about 73% sequence similarity with natural Cas9, exhibited DNA-cleaving activity comparable to wild enzymes. Evo models were also used to successfully design novel transposons, mobile genetic elements for genomic insertion.

== Whole-genome synthesis ==
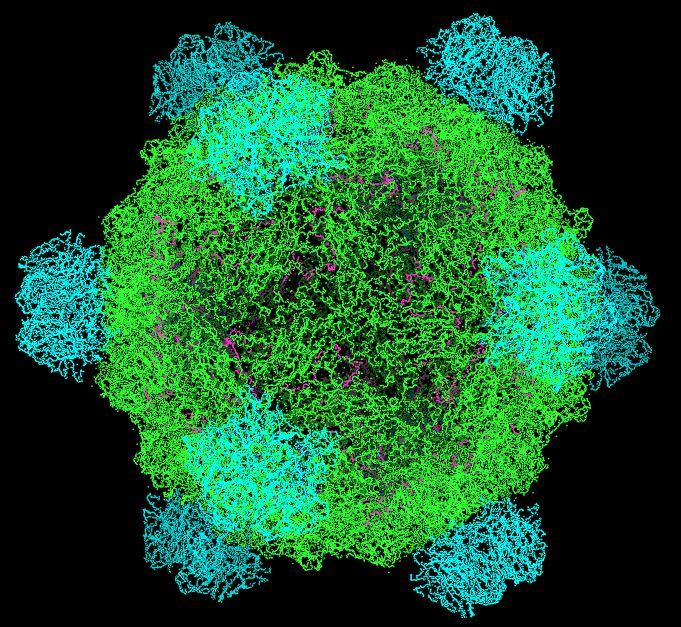
Bacteriophage ΦX174's genome was evolved in Evo experiments.

Researchers have utilized Evo to write complete viral genomes. In experiments led by Brian Hie at the Arc Institute's Laboratory of Evolutionary Design, the Evo model was used to generate hundreds of thousands of candidate synthetic bacteriophage genomes based on the phage Phi X 174. The resulting DNA sequences were then synthesized in a laboratory and used to create novel bacteriophages which were tested by infecting bacterial cultures. This testing showed that 16 of the AI-generated phage genomes such as Evo-Φ2147 were biologically viable, successfully lysing and replicating within Escherichia coli bacteria. Some of the AI-generated bacteriophages demonstrated a faster bacterial killing rate than natural variants, suggesting potential applications in phage therapy to combat antimicrobial resistance.

== Ethics and safety ==
To mitigate potential risks, the training corpus for initial experiments explicitly excluded viruses and pathogens capable of infecting humans or complex organisms. Laboratory testing was restricted to non-pathogenic bacterial host strains within secure containment facilities. Safety studies conducted alongside the release outlined precautionary governance frameworks and bio-screening protocols for DNA synthesis providers.

The publication of the Science paper detailing the use of Evo to create novel virus genomes caused scientists such as Moritz Hanke of the Johns Hopkins Center for Health Security to express concern that "the generation of functional viral genomes has urgent biosafety and biosecurity implications". Hanke noted that, while the US National Institutes of Health had just produced a new policy for stopping high-risk life sciences research, this only addressed known pathogens, not new ones which might be devised by such an AI.

== See also ==
- CRISPR gene editing
- Phage therapy
- Synthetic biology
