= Milorad Belić =

Serbian basketball player and lawyer (1940–2020)

Personal information
- Born: 12 November 1940 Belgrade, Yugoslavia
- Died: 27 November 2020 (aged 80) Belgrade, Serbia

Career information
- Playing career: 1958–1968

Career history
- 1958–1962: Crvena zvezda
- 1962–1964: JA Vichy

Milorad "Mića" Belić (Serbian Cyrillic: Милорад Белић; 12 November 1940 – 27 November 2020) was a Serbian lawyer and basketball player.

== Playing career ==
Belić played 5 seasons for Crvena zvezda of the Yugoslav First Basketball League, from 1958 to 1962. Over 78 games he scored 187 points. At the time his teammates were Vladimir Cvetković, Ratomir Vićentić, Sreten Dragojlović, and Vladislav Lučić among others.

In 1962, Belić moved to France where he played two seasons for JA Vichy of the Première Division under Đorđe Andrijašević, from 1962 to 1964.

== Post-playing career ==
In 1968, Belić begun his career as a lawyer. His expertise was arbitration.

In 2010, Belić was named a board member of Crvena zvezda, led by the board president Vladislav Lučić.

== Personal life ==
Belić attended the First Belgrade Gymnasium where he graduated on 1958. He earned his bachelor's degree in law from the University of Belgrade in 1962.
