= Balići, Novi Travnik =

Balići
- Village
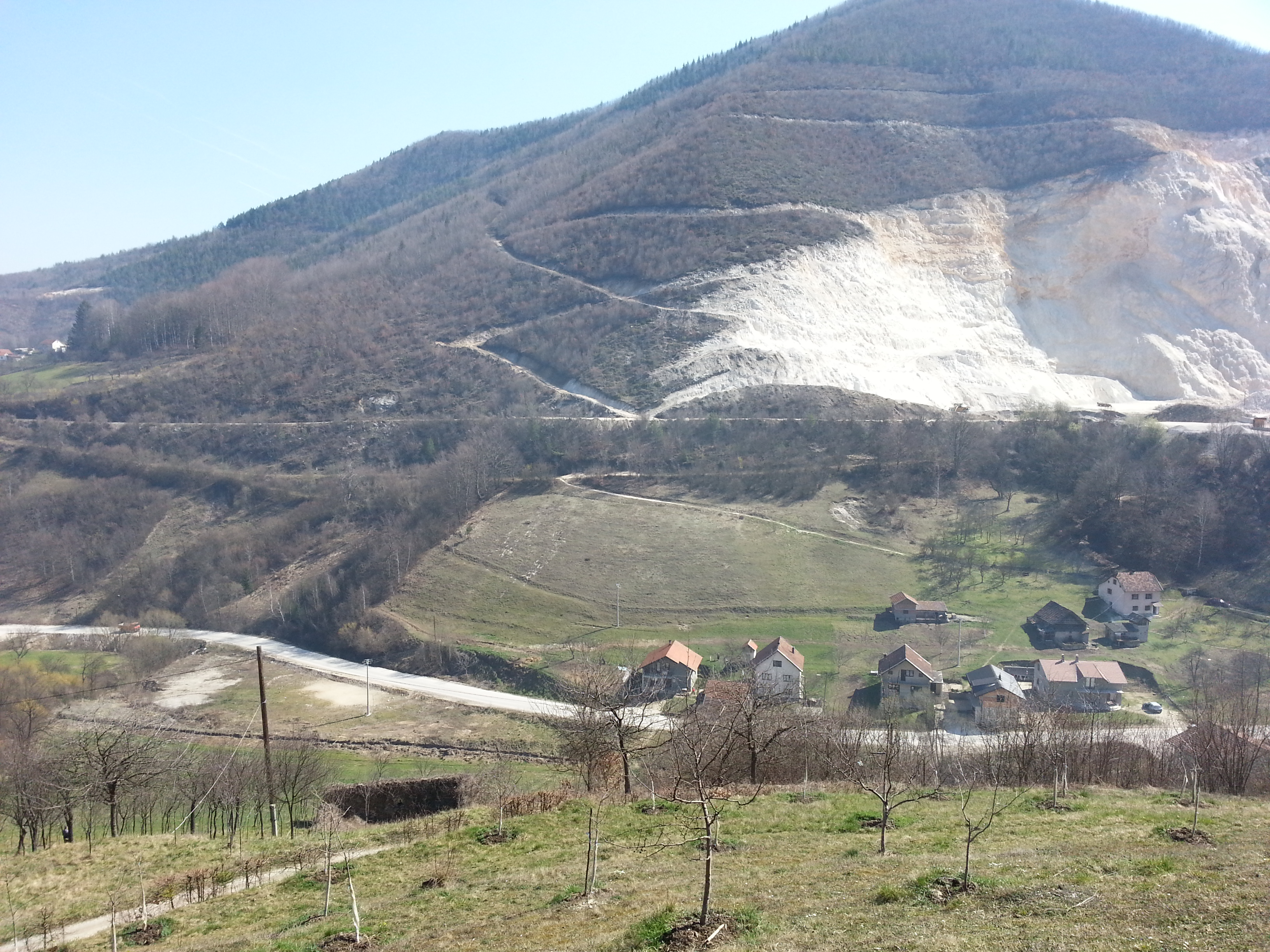

- Location within Bosnia and Herzegovina
- Coordinates: 44.1675265°N 17.7016703°E
- Country: Bosnia and Herzegovina
- Entity: Federation of Bosnia and Herzegovina
- Canton: Central Bosnia
- Municipality: Novi Travnik

Area
  - Total: 3.31 sq mi (8.57 km^{2})

Population (2013)
  - Total: 821
  - Density: 248/sq mi (95.8/km^{2})
- Time zone: UTC+1 (CET)
  - Summer (DST): UTC+2 (CEST)

Balići is a village in the municipality of Novi Travnik, Bosnia and Herzegovina.

== Demographics ==
According to the 2013 census, its population was 821.

Ethnicity in 2013
Ethnicity	Number	Percentage
Croats	768	93.5%
Bosniaks	11	1.3%
Serbs	1	0.1%
other/undeclared	41	5.0%
Total	821	100%
