= Balić =

Balić is a South Slavic surname, found often among the Croats.

Notable people with the name include:

- Andrija Balić (born 1997), Croatian footballer
- Charles Balic (1899–1977), Croatian Franciscan Mariologist
- Davorka Balić (born 1988), Croatian basketball player
- Dominik Balić (born 1996), Croatian footballer
- Ermin Balić, Montenegrin futsal player
- Husein Balić (born 1996), Austrian footballer of Bosnian descent
- Ivano Balić (born 1979), Croatian handballer
- Josip Balić (born 1993), Croatian footballer
- Marijana Balić (born 1981), Croatian politician
- Maro Balić (born 1971), Croatian water polo player
- Saša Balić (born 1990), Montenegrin footballer
- Smail Balić (1920–2002), Bosnian-Austrian historian, culturologist and scholar
- Vladimir Balić (born 1970), Croatian footballer

== See also ==
- Balići (disambiguation), villages
- Baličević, surname
- Baličić, surname
