= Marijana Balić =

Croatian politician (born 1981)

Member of the Croatian Parliament
- In office 2016–2020
- Constituency: District V

Personal details
- Born: 25 December 1981 (age 44) Vukovar, Yugoslavia
- Party: Croatian Democratic Union

Marijana Balić (born 25 December 1981 in Vukovar) is a Croatian politician from the Croatian Democratic Union. She represented District V in the Croatian Parliament from 2016 until 2020.
