= Bdellomicrovirus =

Virus classification
- Missing taxonomy template (fix): Alphagokushoviridae
- Genus: Bdellomicrovirus

Species
- Bdellomicrovirus MH2K

Genus of viruses

Bdellomicrovirus is a genus of viruses, in the family Betagokushoviridae. Bdellovibrio bacteria serve as natural hosts. There is one species in this genus: Bdellomicrovirus MH2K.

== Structure ==
Viruses in Bdellomicrovirus are non-enveloped, with icosahedral and Round geometries, and T=1 symmetry. The diameter is around 30 nm. Genomes are circular, around 4.5kb in length.

Genus	Structure	Symmetry	Capsid	Genomic arrangement	Genomic segmentation
Bdellomicrovirus	Icosahedral	T=1	Non-enveloped	Circular	Monopartite

== Life cycle ==
Viral replication is cytoplasmic. Entry into the host cell is achieved by pilus-mediated adsorption into the host cell. Replication follows the ssDNA rolling circle model. DNA templated transcription is the method of transcription. The virus exits the host cell by bacteria lysis. Bdellovibrio bacteria serve as the natural host.

Genus	Host details	Tissue tropism	Entry details	Release details	Replication site	Assembly site	Transmission
Bdellomicrovirus	Bdellovibrio bacteria	None	Pilus adsorption	Lysis	Cytoplasm	Cytoplasm	Pilus
