= Bilić =

Bilić is a Croatian, Serbian and Bosnian surname.

The most common etymology is that it is derived either from the word bilo, meaning "white" in Ikavian.

It is among the most common surnames in the Split-Dalmatia County.

Notable people with the surname include:

- Cvitko Bilić (born 1943), Croatian cyclist
- Danira Bilić (born 1969), Croatian basketball player
- Joško Bilić (born 1974), Croatian football player
- Jure Bilić (1922–2006), Croatian politician
- Karlo Bilić (born 1993), Croatian footballer
- Marco Bilić (born c. 1939), Bosnian-Croatian football manager and former player
- Marijan Bilić, Croatian footballer
- Mate Bilić (born 1980), Croatian football player
- Mirjana Bilić (born 1936), Serbian gymnast
- Slaven Bilić (born 1968), Croatian football player and football manager
- Zvonimir Bilić (born 1971), Croatian handball player and coach

== See also ==
- Belić, surname
- Bijelić, surname
