= Jerard Hurwitz =

American biochemist (1928–2019)

- Born: November 20, 1928
- Died: January 24, 2019 (aged 90)
- Education: Indiana University Bloomington (BS); Case Western Reserve University (PhD)
- Known for: RNA polymerase discovery
- Awards: Eli Lilly Award in Biological Chemistry
- Scientific career
- Workplaces: Washington University in St. Louis; New York University; Memorial Sloan Kettering Cancer Center
- Thesis: The metabolism of vitamin b_{6} derivatives (1953)
- Website: www.mskcc.org/research-areas/labs/jerard-hurwitz

Jerard Hurwitz (November 20, 1928 – January 24, 2019) was an American biochemist who co-discovered RNA polymerase in 1960 along with Sam Weiss, Audrey Stevens, and James Bonner. He most recently worked at the Sloan-Kettering Institute in New York studying DNA replication in eukaryotes and its control.

== Education ==
Hurwitz attended DeWitt Clinton High School in the Bronx. He then attended City College of New York for a short stint before transferring to Indiana University Bloomington where he earned a B.A. in chemistry in 1949. He received his Ph.D. in biochemistry in 1953 from Case Western Reserve University School of Medicine.

== Career ==
Hurwitz joined the microbiology department at Washington University School of Medicine in 1956 and began investigating the incorporation of ribonucleotides into RNA. Two years later, he moved back to New York and became an assistant professor of microbiology at the New York University Grossman School of Medicine, where he continued to study RNA synthesis.

In 1955, Marianne Grunberg-Manago and Severo Ochoa had reported the isolation of an enzyme that catalyzed the synthesis of RNA. This enzyme was at first hoped to be responsible for the synthesis of RNA in cells, and Ochoa's discovery was honored with a Nobel Prize in 1959. However, it was later realized that Ochoa's enzyme did not use DNA to synthesize RNA but instead formed arbitrary sequences, and later this enzyme was found to degrade RNA in cells. Undeterred by Ochoa's findings, Hurwitz searched for a cellular RNA polymerase on his own and in 1960 he reported the isolation of RNA polymerase activity from Escherichia coli extracts. Remarkably, several other research groups reported similar discoveries at roughly the same time (Samuel B. Weiss, Audrey Stevens, and James Bonner). Hurwitz continued his research on RNA synthesis, and in 1962 Hurwitz, John J. Furth, and Monika Anders reported the purification of RNA polymerase.

Hurwitz along with PhD student Sue Wickner and Reed Wickner also worked on how the DNA of single-stranded DNA virus became replicated. They identified the enzymes that converted single-stranded DNA of the Phi X174 virus into the double-stranded replicative form by means of studying which genes were required for the in vitro synthesis of the double-stranded DNA.

== Awards and honors ==
Hurwitz was a member of the National Academy of Sciences and the American Academy of Arts and Sciences. He has been honored with the Eli Lilly Award in Biological Chemistry, the Institut Pasteur Hazen Lectureship, and the New York Academy of Science's Louis and Bert Freeman Foundation Prize for Research in Biochemistry.
