= Marco Bilić =

Bosnian-Croatian footballer and manager

Marko Bilić
Personal information
- Full name: Marko Bilić
- Date of birth: September 19, 1938 (age 88)
- Place of birth: Jablanica, SFR Yugoslavia
- Position: Goalkeeper

Senior career*
| Years | Team | Apps | (Gls) |
| 1960-1963 | Sarajevo | 45 | (0) |
- Trešnjevka
- NK Zagreb
| 1968 | Cleveland Stokers | 1 | (0) |
- Toronto Croatia

Managerial career
- 1985: Sarajevo
- –1989: Abahani KC
- 1990: Johor FA
- 1991: Perak FA
- 1992: Malacca FA
- 1993: Terengganu FA
- * Club domestic league appearances and goals as of April 29, 2013 ‡ National team caps and goals as of April 29, 2013

Marko Bilić, also spelt as Marco Bilic is a Bosnian-Croatian football manager. He is a retired football goalkeeper, playing for FK Sarajevo. He also played for Cleveland Stokers in the 1968 North American Soccer League season.

== Coaching ==
Bilic has worked as coach or his former club Sarajevo, firstly as a youth coach and then as head coach, guiding the team to the Yugoslavian championship in 1985. He also coached in Bangladesh for Abahani Krira Chakra soccer club.

=== Malaysia ===
Bilic was employed in Malaysia by several teams in the early 1990s, starting with Johor FA in 1990, then Perak FA in 1991 and Malacca FA in 1992. He also served as technical consultant for Terengganu FA from 1992 to 1994 specializing in youth development, and also coached the team in the latter half of 1993.
