= Smail Balić =

Bosnian-Austrian historian

- Born: 26 August 1920; Mostar, Kingdom of Yugoslavia
- Died: 14 March 2002 (aged 81); Vienna, Austria

Smail Balić (26 August 1920 – 14 March 2002) was a Bosnian-Austrian historian, culturologist and scholar. Most of his life was spent abroad. He was employed at various archival and historicist positions, especially in German-speaking countries. Until 1986 he performed a number of significant scientific and archival functions such as a researcher of the Institute for the History of Arabic-Islamic Science at the Goethe University Frankfurt, a member of the Association of Austrian writers, and a corresponding member of the Jordanian Islamic Academy of science. He died in Vienna in 2002.

== Biography ==
Balić was born 26 August 1920 (although a few sources give 20 August 1920) in Mostar, Bosnia and Herzegovina, to a Muslim Bosniak family. In 1995, Balić received the Austrian Cross of Honour for Science and Art, 1st class

== Bibliography ==
- Kultura Bošnjaka (1973)
- Ruf vom Minaret (1984)
- Das unbekannte Bosnien (1992)
