= Volvereviria =

Virus classification
- (unranked): Virus
- Realm: Volvereviria
- Kingdom: Sangervirae
- Phylum: Phixviricota
- Class: Microviricetes

Subtaxa
- See text

Realm of viruses

Volvereviria is a realm of bacterial viruses (bacteriophages) that have single-stranded DNA (ssDNA) genomes and a hallmark single jelly roll fold (SJR) major capsid protein (MCP). Viruses in the realm are commonly called microviruses. They are known for their small, circular ssDNA genomes and small physical size of 25–30 nanometers in diameter, which is why they are called microviruses. The MCP is the primary component of the capsid, a protein shell that surrounds the genome. In addition to the MCP, microviruses encode an endonuclease that is involved in rolling circle replication (RCR) of the genome. Most microviruses also encode a DNA pilot protein that transports the genome into cells.

Microvirus extracellular particles (virions) consist of the genome encased in an icosahedral capsid. Virions also contain numerous copies of the DNA pilot protein as well as protrusions, such as spikes, on the surface of the capsid. Microvirus virions do not have a viral envelope. They infect cells by binding to receptors on the cell surface, after which pilot proteins guide the genome into the cell. The genome is converted to a double-stranded DNA form and replicated through RCR. Progeny genomes are packaged into newly constructed capsids, which leave the bacterium through the rupturing of the cell membrane (lysis). Compared to double-stranded DNA viruses and other DNA bacteriophages, microviruses have a high mutation rate, albeit lower than that of RNA viruses.

Microviruses are widespread in bacteria, but individual microviruses tend to have narrow host ranges, infecting only a few species or strains of a species. They are the most abundant ssDNA viruses in the world and have been found in nearly every environment analyzed. Microviruses are believed to originate from a RCR plasmid that recombined with an RNA virus or host DNA to obtain the SJR MCP. The first to be discovered was phiX174, in the 1930s. Microviruses were first grouped together in the family Microviridae, which became official in 1978. In 2020, they were assigned to the kingdom Sangervirae in the realm Monodnaviria. In 2026, Monodnaviria was split into four realms corresponding to its four kingdoms after evidence showed the kingdoms had different evolutionary origins. This gave microviruses their own realm, Volvereviria.

== Classification ==
Volvereviria is monotypic down to the rank of its sole class, Microviricetes, which has seven orders. This is shown hereafter:

- Realm: Volvereviria
  - Kingdom: Sangervirae
    - Phylum: Phixviricota
      - Class: Microviricetes
        - Order: Alpavirales
        - Order: Amoyvirales
        - Order: Bullavirales, which contains phiX174
        - Order: Gokushovirales
        - Order: Reekeekeevirales
        - Order: Roodoodoovirales
        - Order: Secretvirales

== Characteristics ==
=== Genome ===
A diagram of phiX174's genome. F encodes the major capsid protein, A encodes the replication-initiator protein, and H encodes the pilot protein. These three genes make up most of the genome.

Volverevirians, i.e. microviruses, (Note: The term "microvirus" is much more widely used than "volverevirian", so this article refers to volverevirians as microviruses.) have circular, positive-sense, single-stranded DNA genomes. Isolated microvirus genomes range from about 4,200 to 6,100 nucleotides in length, whereas genomes derived from metagenomics expand the range to 3,000 to 8,900 nucleotides in length. Most of the genome is made of three core genes that encode a major capsid protein (MCP), an endonuclease, and a DNA pilot protein. Varying numbers of smaller genes that encode other proteins are also present. Genomes have many overlapping reading frames.

=== Proteins ===
==== Major capsid protein ====
Microviruses encode a major capsid protein, called F or VP1 (viral protein 1) for certain phages, numerous copies of which form the capsid. The MCP has a single jelly roll (SJR) motif that consists of eight antiparallel beta-barrel strands connected by loops. The eight beta strands are organized into two beta sheets named βBIDG and βCHEF. The two sheets are arranged in such a manner that the βBIDG sheet forms the interior surface of the capsid, while the βCHEF sheet is mostly buried within the walls of the capsid. The loops of the MCP contribute to the features of the capsid's exterior surface and mediate interactions with specific cellular receptors.

==== Replication-initiator protein ====
Microviruses encode a replication-initiator protein that contains a HUH superfamily endonuclease domain. Endonucleases are enzymes that can cleave phosphodiester bonds within a polynucleotide chain. HUH endonucleases contain three conserved motifs: a UUTU motif, which is believed to be involved in recognizing replication origins; the HUH motif, made of two histidine (H) residues separated by a hydrophobic residue (U), which is involved with coordinating Mg^{2+} or Mn^{2+} ions, which are necessary for endonuclease activity; and the YxxK/YxxKY motif, which is involved in dsDNA cleavage and covalent attachment of Rep to DNA through its tyrosine (Y) residue. The HUH endonuclease of ssDNA viruses is often called the replication-initiator protein, or Rep, because of its role in commencing replication. Other names of the microvirus Rep protein include A and VP4.

==== Other proteins ====
Most microviruses also encode a multifunctional alpha-helical DNA pilot protein (F or VP2). The pilot protein guides genomic ssDNA from the capsid into the host by organizing into multimers that form an extendable tunnel through which ssDNA passes. Although the pilot protein is a hallmark trait of microviruses, its gene's sequence diversity means it can't be used to identify viruses belonging to the realm. Other common proteins encoded by microviruses include scaffold folding and DNA-binding and packaging proteins, used for assembling virions, as well as spike proteins. There are also predicted, nonessential coding sequences related to host cell lysis, anti-immune system proteins, and secretion signals. The vast majority of these minor proteins, however, do not have known functions. Unlike other DNA phages, microviruses do not have genes that encode supplementary metabolic proteins.

=== Structure ===
Microvirus extracellular particles (virions) are about 25–30 nanometers in diameter. The viral genome, on the inside of the virion, is surrounded by an icosahedral capsid made of 60 copies of the MCP. DNA-binding proteins associate with the phosphate backbone of the genome and 60 binding sites located near the 3-fold axes of symmetry in viral coat proteins, resulting in the genome being aligned with the capsid's icosahedral symmetry on the interior surface of the capsid. The 60 MCPs organize into 12 pentamers centered on the 12 vertices of the icosahedral capsid. Virions also contain numerous copies of the pilot protein. Characterized microviruses have protrusions on the surface of the capsid, such as spikes, the structure and positioning of these protrusions varying by taxon. The capsid is not enveloped.

=== Life cycle ===
Microviruses attach to the surface of bacteria before entering. The manner by which they enter cells is unclear, but it has been proposed that they bind to an initial receptor before "walking" or "rolling" to attach to a second receptor. The genome is then ejected from the capsid into the bacterium with the aid of pilot proteins and translocated to the site of DNA synthesis in the cytoplasm. Microviruses do not encode their own replication machinery, so replication is performed by host DNA polymerases. The first step during replication is to convert the ssDNA genome to a double-stranded DNA (dsDNA) replicative form (RF) molecule. A primosome complex binds to ssDNA and progresses in a 5′ ("five prime") to 3′ ("three prime") direction as it synthesizes RNA primers to prime DNA synthesis by a host DNA polymerase.

During the next stage, DNA from the RF molecule is copied, which requires the viral Rep protein and a host superfamily 1 helicase. Rep binds to the replication origin, nicks the DNA, and forms a covalent bond with the DNA. The helicase unwinds the RF molecule and the host cell ssDNA binding protein (ssb) stabilizes the molecule. Replication progresses around the genome, using the negative-sense strand as a template to synthesize a positive-sense strand, until one round around the genome is completed. Rep then nicks the newly synthesized origin on the positive-sense strand and connects the ends of the strand together to form a covalently closed circular ssDNA molecule. Synthesis of a complementary negative-sense strand is then done the same way as in the first stage of replication. Genes can be expressed once the negative-sense strand is synthesized.

Whether the RF molecule is used to synthesize dsDNA or progeny ssDNA depends on which proteins bind to the RF molecule. If Rep and the host ssb protein bind to the origin, then the RF molecule is used to synthesize dsDNA. If the viral protein C binds in place of ssb, then the RF molecule is used to synthesize progeny ssDNA genomes. C inhibits dsDNA synthesis, mediating the switch to ssDNA synthesis. As genomic ssDNA is synthesized, it is packaged into progeny capsids after they are assembled. During packaging, DNA-binding proteins enter the procapsid and tether part of the genome to the interior surface of the capsid.

After progeny have been synthesized, lysis occurs. phiX174 and its close relatives use single-gene lysis (Sgl), encoding a single protein that lyses cells for progeny viruses to exit the host cell. This protein is called E for phiX174. In gram-negative bacteria, E non-competitively inhibits MraY, an enzyme that forms the first lipid-linked intermediate, lipid I, in the peptidoglycan (PG) biosynthesis pathway. The PG layer is essential to the structure and shape of the bacterial cell envelope, forming multiples layers of the cell wall. SlyD, a peptidyl-prolyl isomerase, is often required for E-driven lysis, as it likely chaperones the folding of E. The Sgl proteins of other microviruses have not been studied, and metagenomic surveys have indicated that E-like proteins are not found in most microviruses.

Some microviruses are able to become integrated into the genome of their host, becoming a prophage. They do this by exploiting host XerCD recombinases that normally resolve dimers created when two copies of replicating bacterial chromosomes undergo homologous recombination. XerC and XerD bind to dif motifs opposite the replication of origin, nick the DNA, and, with other host factors, untangle sister chromosomes and re-connect the ends, which separates the chromosomes. Microvirus sequences that mimic dif motifs may be recognized by XerCD and integrated into the genome. The pilot protein's DNA in the prophage contains a hypervariable region that prevents superinfection of the same cell with other microviruses that have similar hypervariable regions.

=== Evolution ===
Microviruses have a higher mutation rate than dsDNA viruses and other DNA bacteriophages but lower than RNA viruses. They do not, however, necessarily adopt an r-selected reproductive strategy, which produces a large number of progeny, since the number of virions produced per cell in a given amount of time is highly variable. Horizontal gene transfer (HGT) has been observed in some microviruses, but it does not appear to be important for them. They do not typically obtain genes from their hosts or other viruses via HGT, with the exception of peptidases and methyltransferases that are widespread in cellular life and virus realms. HGT between microviruses of different genera also appears to be uncommon.

== Distribution ==
Microviruses infect bacteria spanning across numerous phyla. Many microviruses that have been discovered were found as prophages integrated into the genome of their host. Although microviruses are widespread, they tend to have narrow host ranges, infecting only a small number of species or strains of a species. Identified hosts include enterobacteria, intracellular parasitic bacteria, and mollicutes such as Spiroplasma. Microviruses dominate the viromes of intracellular parasitic bacteria, such as Chlamydia and Bdellovibrio, and are the only viruses known to infect Chlamydia.

Microviruses are among the most widely distributed viruses on the planet, as they are the most widely distributed ssDNA viruses on Earth. phiX174 and its close relatives, however, are relatively uncommon and make up only about 1% of sequenced microviruses. Nearly all phage genomes less than 10 kb in size are of microviruses. They have been detected in nearly all habitats analyzed and are especially common in certain environments, such as the human gut and deep sea sediments. Other environments where they have been found include human breast milk, saltwater, freshwater, wastewater, and the gut of other organisms such as sea squirts.

In the human gut, the virome is dominated by caudoviruses and microviruses, though caudoviruses are more common than microviruses. The presence of microviruses in the human gut is initially low at birth but increases during the first two years of life. Along with many other biomarkers, microviruses are more abundant in people with colorectal cancer (CRC) than those without CRC. For people who have inflammatory bowel disease, ulcerative colitis, Crohn's disease, and pediatric type 1 diabetes, however, microviruses are less abundant than those without such conditions.

== Phylogenetics ==
The SJR fold of the microvirus MCP is common in ssDNA viruses and also found in cellular life forms, from which viruses likely inherited it to use as capsid proteins. The MCP of microviruses is most similar in structure to eukaryotic tumor necrosis factor proteins and collagen-binding domains. Among viruses, the microvirus MCP most closely resembles the capsid protein of bromoviruses, a family of plant viruses with RNA genomes. Microvirus MCPs, however, form a monophyletic clade distinct from the capsid proteins of other viruses. A phylogenetic tree of the orders in the realm, based on the capsid protein, is shown hereafter:

- Volvereviria / Microviricetes
  - Reekeekeevirales
  - - Amoyvirales
    - - Secretvirales
      - - - Roodoodoovirales
          - Bullavirales, which contains phiX174
        - - Alpavirales
          - Gokushovirales

The HUH endonuclease encoded by microviruses is also common in other viruses and non-viral mobile genetic elements. Microvirus endonucleases, however, lack the helicase domain common to other Rep proteins, such as those of eukaryotic ssDNA viruses (realm Floreoviria) and form their own monophyletic clade. Owing to the monophyly of both the endonuclease and the MCP, microviruses likely emerged on a single occasion when a Rep-encoding, RCR plasmid obtained the SJR capsid protein of an RNA virus or a cellular host independent of other viruses. As microviruses infect multiple bacteria phyla, they likely have ancient origins, potentially as far back as before the last bacterial common ancestor.

== History ==
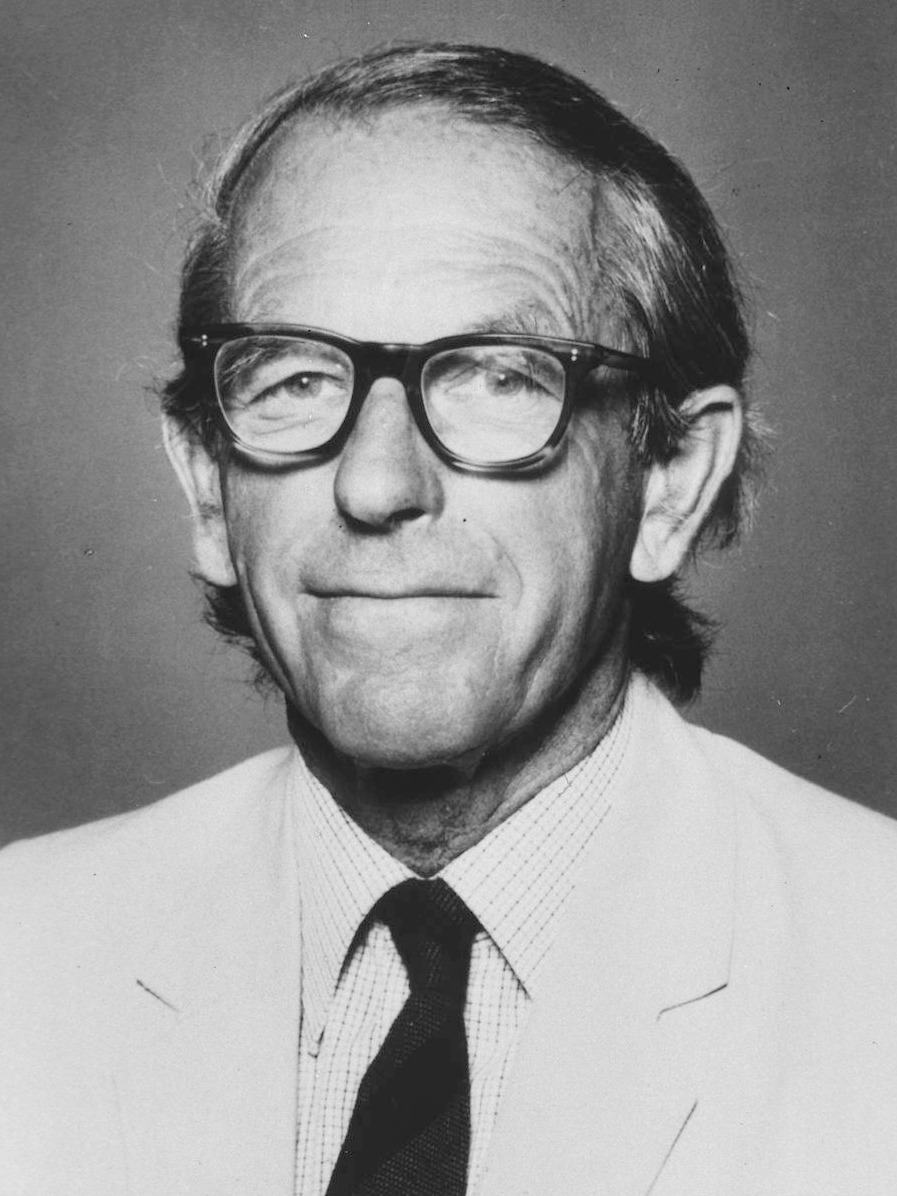
Frederick Sanger and his group sequenced the genome of phiX174.

The first microvirus discovered was phiX174, isolated from Escherichia coli in the 1930s. phiX174 was the first biological entity discovered to have a single-stranded DNA genome as well as covalent circular DNA, and its genome was the first DNA genome to be completely sequenced and the first to be synthesized in vitro. Since its discovery, phiX174 has become one of the most thoroughly studied viruses, serving as a model in molecular biology to study DNA replication, viral DNA packaging, and capsid assembly. For example, the E gene of phiX174 was the first gene found in an alternate reading frame of another gene and the first gene to undergo site-directed mutagenesis. More broadly, microviruses were among the first bacterial viruses to be studied with X-ray crystallography. phiX174, in 1992, became the second ssDNA virus to have its capsid structure determined by X-ray crystallography.

In the decades after phiX174's discovery, microviruses were only isolated from 11 bacteria genera. More recent metagenomic analyses, however, have shown that they are widespread and likely undercounted in surveys of virus populations. Consequently, microviruses are considered to be undersampled, with their full diversity not yet captured. The disparity between the number of microviruses observed in isolation versus in metagenomic surveys may be because microviruses might be undetectable with standard isolation methods, such as sampling techniques that only capture dsDNA viruses. Once rolling circle amplification was implemented to amplify ssDNA genomes, a broader scope of ssDNA virus distribution was realized.

Microviruses were first grouped together as the family Microviridae in the 1960s, which became official in 1978. The name "microvirus" was also shared with the genus Microvirus in the family Microviridae. This genus was dissolved with the establishment of the subfamily Bullavirinae and three new genera in the subfamily in 2016. A few years later, in 2020, microviruses (Microviridae) were classified in the realm Monodnaviria with other Rep-encoding ssDNA viruses. Within Monodnaviria, microviruses were assigned to the monotypic taxa Sangervirae, Phixviricota, Malgrandaviricetes, and Petitvirales, the first two of which are still used in microvirus classification. In 2026, Monodnaviria was split into four realms corresponding to its four kingdoms after evidence showed that the kingdoms had separate evolutionary origins. With this split, Sangervirae was moved to its own realm, Volvereviria.

=== Etymology ===
Volvereviria takes the first part of its name from the Latin word "volvere", which means "to roll". This refers to rolling circle replication, which is the method of DNA replication used by viruses in the realm. The second part is -viria, the suffix used for virus realms. The only kingdom in the realm, Sangervirae, is named after Frederick Sanger, who used phiX174 to determine the first DNA sequence, with the suffix for virus kingdoms, -virae. The realm's only phylum, Phixviricota, takes its name from phiX174 and the virus phylum suffix -viricota. Lastly, the realm's sole class, Microviricetes, inherits its name from the former family Microviridae, which was elevated to the rank of class. Microviricetes is derived from the word "micro", from the Ancient Greek word μικρός (mikrós), which refers to the small genome size of microviruses, and the suffix used for virus classes, -viricetes.

== See also ==
- List of higher virus taxa
