= Sutivanac =

Sutivanac San Giovanni d'Arsa
- Village
- Location within Croatia
- Coordinates: 45.1362938°N 13.9902843°E
- Country: Croatia
- County: Istria
- Municipality: Barban

Area
  - Total: 4.6 sq mi (12.0 km^{2})

Population (2021)
  - Total: 333
  - Density: 71.9/sq mi (27.8/km^{2})
- Time zone: UTC+1 (CET)
  - Summer (DST): UTC+2 (CEST)
- Postal code: 52207 Barban
- Area code: 052

Sutivanac (Italian: San Giovanni d'Arsa) is a village in Istria, Croatia.

Sutivanac is traditional name for the village and parish in this area, but its hamlets used to be registered as separate settlements in the 19th and 20th centuries: Dolica, Medančići, Cvitići, Varož, Gorica and Balići II.

== Demographics ==
According to the 2021 census, its population was 333, making it the largest village of Barban municipality.
